= List of census-designated places in Connecticut =

Map of the United States with Connecticut highlighted

Census-designated places (CDPs) are unincorporated communities lacking elected municipal officers and boundaries with legal status. Connecticut has 185 census-designated places. Some CDPs do not have separate pages from their parent town, while others are coterminous with their parent town. Further, some CDPs take the name of their parent town.

== Census-designated places ==
| CDP | Population | County |
|---|---|---|
| Ball Pond | 2,623 | Fairfield |
| Baltic | 1,266 | New London |
| Bethel | 11,606 | Fairfield |
| Bethlehem Village | 2,275 | Litchfield |
| Bigelow Corners | 841 | Fairfield |
| Blue Hills | 2,762 | Hartford |
| Bogus Hill | 163 | Fairfield |
| Botsford | 702 | Fairfield |
| Branchville | 91 | Fairfield |
| Branford Center | 6,130 | New Haven |
| Bridgewater | 143 | Litchfield |
| Broad Brook | 4,069 | Hartford |
| Brookfield Center | 201 | Fairfield |
| Brooklyn | 981 | Windham |
| Byram | 5,011 | Fairfield |
| Canaan | 1,297 | Litchfield |
| Candlewood Isle | 569 | Fairfield |
| Candlewood Knolls | 150 | Fairfield |
| Candlewood Lake Club | 235 | Fairfield |
| Candlewood Orchards | 683 | Fairfield |
| Candlewood Shores | 534 | Fairfield |
| Cannondale | 677 | Fairfield |
| Canton Valley | 1,364 | Hartford |
| Cheshire Village | 6,049 | New Haven |
| Chester Center | 1,876 | Middlesex |
| Chimney Point | 112 | Litchfield |
| Clinton | 3,441 | Middlesex |
| Colchester | 4,624 | New London |
| Coleytown | 3,479 | Fairfield |
| Collinsville | 4,001 | Hartford |
| Compo | 3,561 | Fairfield |
| Conning Towers Nautilus Park | 8,590 | New London |
| Cornwall | 1,575 | Litchfield |
| Cornwall Bridge | 239 | Litchfield |
| Cos Cob | 6,873 | Fairfield |
| Coventry Lake | 2,990 | Tolland |
| Crystal Lake | 1,945 | Tolland |
| Daniels Farm | 5,995 | Fairfield |
| Darien Downtown | 1,329 | Fairfield |
| Dayville | 6,568 | Windham |
| Deep River Center | 2,765 | Middlesex |
| Dodgingtown | 199 | Fairfield |
| Durham | 3,771 | Middlesex |
| East Brooklyn | 2,205 | Windham |
| East Hampton | 2,960 | Middlesex |
| East Hartford | 51,045 | Hartford |
| East Haven | 27,923 | New Haven |
| East Village | 3,744 | Fairfield |
| Essex Village | 2,583 | Middlesex |
| Fairfield University | 2,884 | Fairfield |
| Falls Village | 452 | Litchfield |
| Gales Ferry | 1,027 | New London |
| Gaylordsville | 660 | Litchfield |
| Georgetown | 1,832 | Fairfield |
| Glastonbury Center | 7,387 | Hartford |
| Glenville | 2,663 | Fairfield |
| Greens Farms | 3,022 | Fairfield |
| Greenwich | 12,942 | Fairfield |
| Guilford Center | 2,272 | New Haven |
| Hawleyville | 131 | Fairfield |
| Hazardville | 4,599 | Hartford |
| Heritage Village | 4,517 | New Haven |
| Higganum | 2,089 | Middlesex |
| Indian Field | 430 | Fairfield |
| Inglenook | 1,162 | Fairfield |
| Kellogg Point | 23 | Fairfield |
| Kensington | 8,459 | Hartford |
| Knollcrest | 277 | Fairfield |
| Lake Bungee | 566 | Windham |
| Lake Chaffee | 299 | Windham |
| Lake Pocotopaug | 4,901 | Middlesex |
| Lakes East | 1,295 | Fairfield |
| Lakes West | 1,308 | Fairfield |
| Lakeside Woods | 309 | Fairfield |
| Lakeville | 641 | Litchfield |
| Long Hill | 12,755 | Fairfield |
| Long Hill | 8,597 | New London |
| Lordship | 3,613 | Fairfield |
| Madison Center | 1,818 | New Haven |
| Mamanasco Lake | 462 | Fairfield |
| Manchester | 30,577 | Hartford |
| Mansfield Center | 947 | Tolland |
| Mashantucket | 457 | New London |
| Mechanicsville | 677 | Windham |
| Mill Plain | 1,980 | Fairfield |
| Moodus | 1,982 | Middlesex |
| Moosup | 3,166 | Windham |
| Murray | 688 | Fairfield |
| Mystic | 4,348 | New London |
| New Canaan | 7,399 | Fairfield |
| New Hartford Center | 1,385 | Litchfield |
| New Milford | 7,632 | Litchfield |
| New Preston | 1,121 | Litchfield |
| Newington | 30,536 | Hartford |
| Niantic | 3,302 | New London |
| Noank | 1,617 | New London |
| Norfolk | 608 | Litchfield |
| Noroton | 5,317 | Fairfield |
| Noroton Heights | 3,116 | Fairfield |
| North Granby | 1,944 | Hartford |
| North Grosvenordale | 1,097 | Windham |
| North Haven | 24,253 | New Haven |
| Northford | 6,082 | New Haven |
| Northwest Harwinton | 3,158 | Litchfield |
| Oakville | 9,233 | Litchfield |
| Old Greenwich | 6,904 | Fairfield |
| Old Hill | 3,078 | Fairfield |
| Old Mystic | 3,184 | New London |
| Old Saybrook Center | 2,278 | Middlesex |
| Orange | 13,956 | New Haven |
| Oronoque | 3,908 | Fairfield |
| Oxoboxo River | 2,955 | New London |
| Pawcatuck | 5,475 | New London |
| Pemberwick | 3,899 | Fairfield |
| Plainfield Village | 2,260 | Windham |
| Plantsville | 2,045 | Hartford |
| Plattsville | 742 | Fairfield |
| Pleasant Valley | 343 | Litchfield |
| Poplar Plains | 1,203 | Fairfield |
| Poquonock Bridge | 1,108 | New London |
| Portland | 5,813 | Middlesex |
| Putnam | 7,214 | Windham |
| Quasset Lake | 1,294 | Windham |
| Quinebaug | 1,163 | Windham |
| Quinnipiac University | 3,639 | New Haven |
| Redding Center | 217 | Fairfield |
| Ridgebury | 1,949 | Fairfield |
| Ridgefield | 7,657 | Fairfield |
| Riverside | 8,843 | Fairfield |
| Riverton | 342 | Litchfield |
| Rock Ridge | 453 | Fairfield |
| Rockville | 7,920 | Tolland |
| Route 7 Gateway | 1,032 | Fairfield |
| Sacred Heart University | 1,446 | Fairfield |
| Sail Harbor | 136 | Fairfield |
| Salmon Brook | 2,324 | Hartford |
| Sandy Hook | 9,718 | Fairfield |
| Saugatuck | 3,091 | Fairfield |
| Saybrook Manor | 1,172 | Middlesex |
| Sharon | 495 | Litchfield |
| Sherman | 3,527 | Fairfield |
| Sherwood Manor | 5,410 | Hartford |
| Simsbury Center | 6,326 | Hartford |
| Somers | 1,990 | Tolland |
| South Coventry | 1,483 | Tolland |
| South Wilton | 1,453 | Fairfield |
| South Windham | 1,391 | Windham |
| South Woodstock | 1,291 | Windham |
| Southport | 1,710 | Fairfield |
| Southwood Acres | 7,657 | Hartford |
| Stafford Springs | 11,000 | Tolland |
| Staples | 6,985 | Fairfield |
| Stepney | 5,583 | Fairfield |
| Storrs | 15,979 | Tolland |
| Stratford Downtown | 1,758 | Fairfield |
| Suffield Depot | 1,325 | Hartford |
| Tariffville | 1,607 | Hartford |
| Tashua | 3,436 | Fairfield |
| Taylor Corners | 501 | Fairfield |
| Terramuggus | 1,025 | Hartford |
| Terryville | 5,112 | Litchfield |
| Thomaston | 2,131 | Litchfield |
| Thompsonville | 8,577 | Hartford |
| Tokeneke | 2,794 | Fairfield |
| Topstone | 94 | Fairfield |
| Trumbull Center | 10,137 | Fairfield |
| Wallingford Center | 18,107 | New Haven |
| Waterford | 3,496 | New London |
| Watertown | 4,215 | Litchfield |
| Wauregan | 1,209 | Windham |
| Weatogue | 2,851 | Hartford |
| West Cornwall | 56 | Litchfield |
| West Hartford | 64,083 | Hartford |
| West Mountain | 418 | Fairfield |
| West Simsbury | 2,878 | Hartford |
| Westbrook Center | 2,529 | Middlesex |
| Weston | 2,371 | Fairfield |
| Westport Village | 2,863 | Fairfield |
| Wethersfield | 27,298 | Hartford |
| Willimantic | 18,150 | Windham |
| Wilton Center | 1,730 | Fairfield |
| Windsor Locks | 12,613 | Hartford |
| Winsted | 7,712 | Litchfield |
| Witches Woods | 472 | Windham |
| Woodbury Center | 1,491 | Litchfield |

== See also ==
- List of municipalities in Connecticut
