= Candlewood =

Candlewood may refer to:

== Geography ==
- Candlewood Lake, the largest lake in Connecticut
- Candlewood, New Jersey, an unincorporated community in the United States.
- Candlewood Town Park, a public park in Danbury, Connecticut
- Candlewood Isle, Connecticut, a census-designated place in the United States.
- Candlewood Knolls, Connecticut, a census-designated place in the United States.
- Candlewood Lake Club, Connecticut, a census-designated place in the United States.
- Candlewood Orchards, Connecticut, a census-designated place in the United States.
- Candlewood Shores, Connecticut, a census-designated place in the United States.

== Botany ==
- Pterocelastrus tricuspidatus, a medium-sized evergreen tree, indigenous to South Africa.
- Dracaena americana, the Central American dragon tree

== Companies ==
- Candlewood Suites, a hotel chain
