= Candlewood Isle, Connecticut =

Census-designated place in Connecticut, United States

- Census-designated place
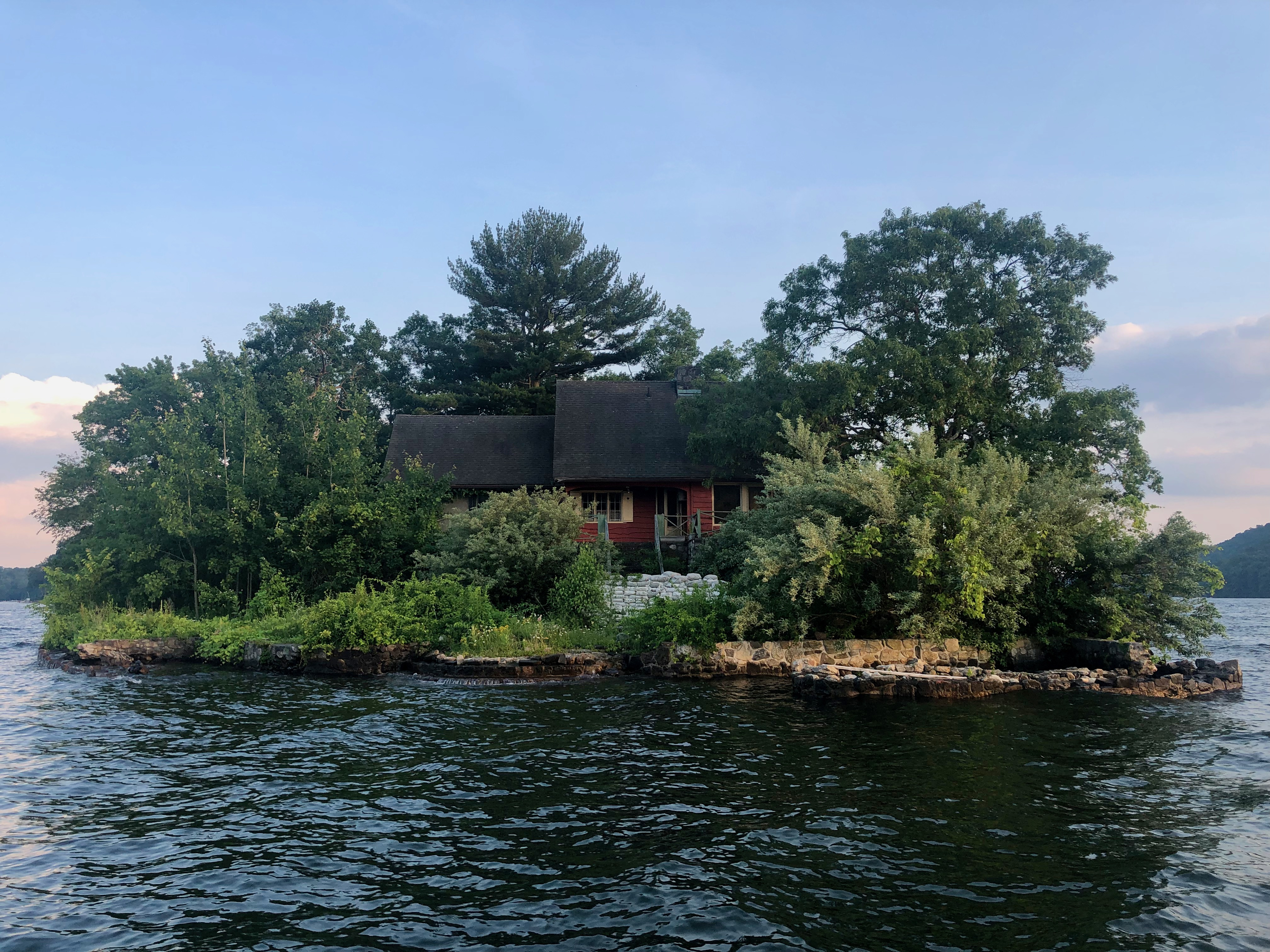
- Island House off the tip of Candlewood Isle

- Nickname: The Isle
- Location within the Western Connecticut Planning Region and the state of Connecticut

- Location within Connecticut Location within the United States
- Coordinates: 41°29′1″N 73°27′18″W
- Country: United States
- State: Connecticut
- Counties: Fairfield
- Region: Western CT
- Town: New Fairfield

Area
  - Total: 1.19 sq mi (3.08 km^{2})
  - Land: 0.39 sq mi (1.01 km^{2})
  - Water: 0.80 sq mi (2.06 km^{2})
- Elevation: 640 ft (200 m)
- Time zone: UTC-5 (Eastern (EST))
  - Summer (DST): UTC-4 (EDT)
- ZIP Code: 06812 (New Fairfield)
- Area codes: 203/475
- FIPS code: 09-11360
- GNIS feature ID: 2805934
- Website: candlewoodisle.communitysite.com

Candlewood Isle is a census-designated place (CDP) on an island of the same name in Candlewood Lake, in the town of New Fairfield, Fairfield County, Connecticut, United States. It is in the southeastern section of the town, about 10 miles from Danbury, with Candlewood Knolls and Kellogg Point on the mainland to the west and Candlewood Lake Club, Candlewood Shores and Candlewood Orchards across the lake to the east. Candlewood Isle was famously the location of the 1955 "Lake Shark" sighting.

Candlewood Isle was first listed as a CDP prior to the 2020 census. As of the 2020 census, Candlewood Isle had a population of 491.

== History ==
Candlewood Isle was developed in the years immediately following the creation of Candlewood Lake. In 1929, Price, Miller & Schiller Inc. purchased the newly formed island property with plans to develop a highly restricted summer colony. Early homes were designed by architect Robert C. Kilborn. According to Kilborn, Candlewood Isle was developed with strict architectural controls intended to preserve a rustic character. All buildings were required to have exteriors of logs, log slab, log cabin siding or wavy edge siding, wood shingle roofs, and earth-toned colors. Building heights were generally limited to one-and-a-half stories, with attached garages preferred. All construction plans required approval by the supervising architect, with on-site inspections to ensure compliance.

The Isle remained a seasonal summer community until the 1960s, when residents began weatherizing their homes for year-round use. In 1962, Candlewood Isle residents petitioned the Town of New Fairfield to establish a special tax district to fund infrastructure and services such as private road maintenance and special police protection, as specified in property deeds. However, it was not until 1970 that the Candlewood Isle Tax District was formally established. On November 7, 1970, it was incorporated as "The Candlewood Isle Community Association, Inc.", before being renamed the "District of Candlewood Isle" in 1972.

== Notable residents ==
- Roy Gordon, Canadian metallurgist and chemist
- Jeanne Glynn, American television writer and actress
- Frank Moser, American animator and illustrator

== Gallery ==
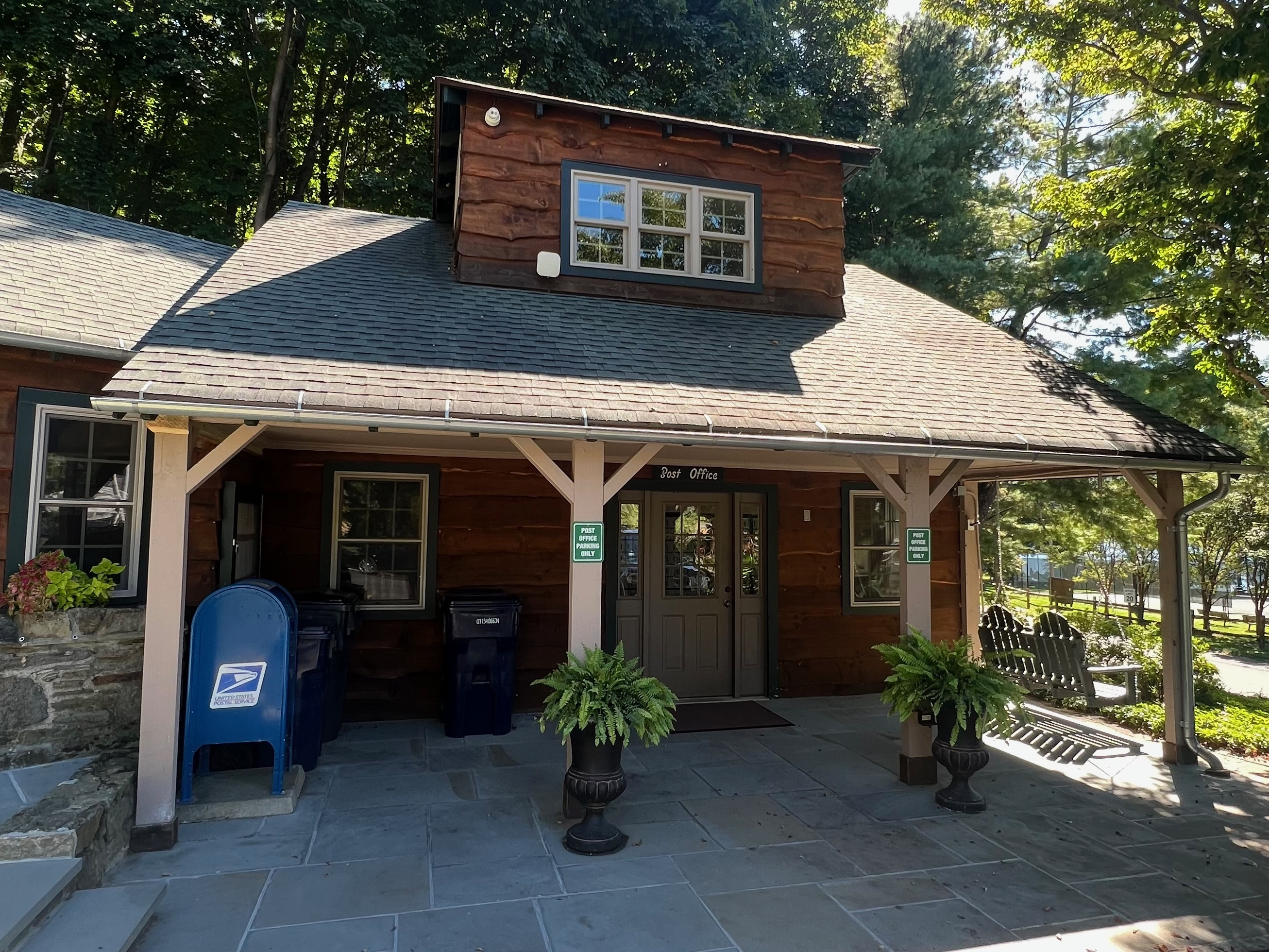
Post Office at Candlewood Isle
