= Chimney Point, Connecticut =

Census-designated place in Connecticut, United States

- Census-designated place
- Location within the Western Connecticut Planning Region and the state of Connecticut

- Location within Connecticut Location within the United States
- Coordinates: 41°30′9″N 73°26′28″W
- Country: United States
- State: Connecticut
- County: Litchfield
- Town: New Milford

Area
  - Total: 0.11 sq mi (0.29 km^{2})
  - Land: 0.11 sq mi (0.29 km^{2})
  - Water: 0 sq mi (0.0 km^{2})
- Elevation: 460 ft (140 m)
- Time zone: UTC-5 (Eastern (EST))
  - Summer (DST): UTC-4 (EDT)
- ZIP Code: 06776 (New Milford)
- Area codes: 860/959
- FIPS code: 09-14615
- GNIS feature ID: 2805978

Chimney Point is a census-designated place (CDP) in the town of New Milford, Litchfield County, Connecticut, United States. It is in the southwestern corner of the town, on a peninsula of the same name on the east side of Candlewood Lake. It is bordered to the south by Candlewood Lake Club. As of the 2020 census, Chimney Point had a population of 133.

Chimney Point was first listed as a CDP prior to the 2020 census.
