= Ball Pond =

Lake in New Fairfield, Connecticut

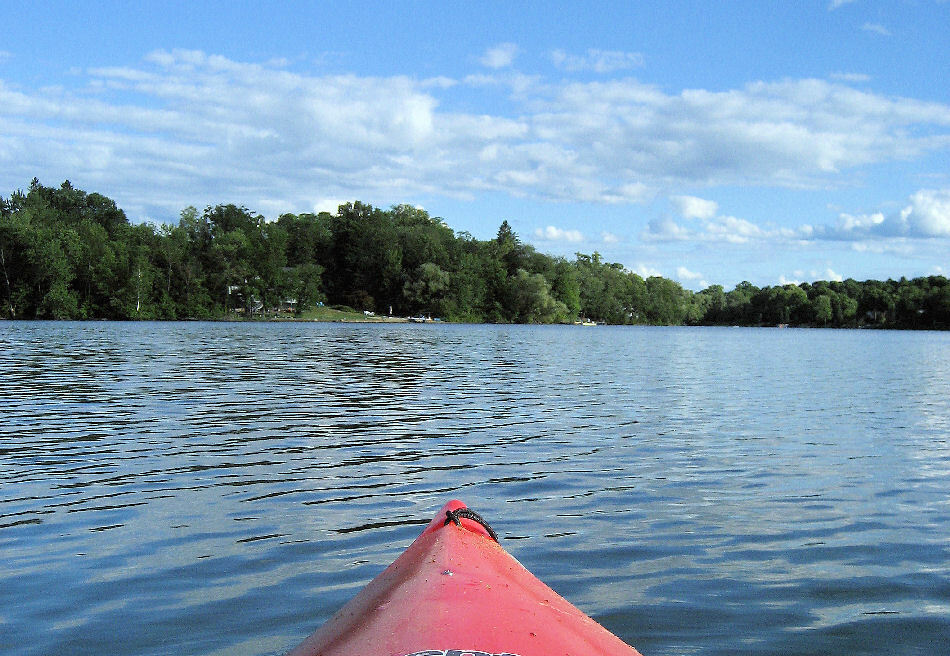
- Ball Pond, 2007

- Location within Connecticut
- Location: New Fairfield, Connecticut
- Coordinates: 41°27′49″N 73°31′26″W
- Surface area: 83 acres (34 ha)
- Average depth: 7 meters (23 ft)
- Max. depth: 16 meters (52 ft)
- Water volume: 2,150,000 cubic metres (76,000,000 cu ft)

Interactive map of Ball Pond

Ball Pond is an 83-acre lake located in New Fairfield, Connecticut. It is the namesake of the CDP of the same name.

Ball Pond is a glacial kettle lake naturally filled by groundwater springs and surface water runoff. It is located within the drainage basin of the Housatonic River and has a watershed of 246 acres (100 ha). The watershed mostly contains residential developments with septic-sewage systems, which load the lake with nitrogen and phosphorus. The pond has one outflow, Ball Pond Brook, which itself drains into Candlewood Lake.

The lake was originally named Lake Hahlawah after a local medicine man. The Hahlawah Preserve is three parcels of protected forestland near Ball Pond.

== Ecology ==
Ball Pond is stocked with brown trout and rainbow trout by the Connecticut Department of Energy and Environmental Protection. Other species found include bass, panfish, bullhead, bluegill, and small populations of white perch and yellow perch.

In 1997, populations of grass carp were introduced as a biocontrol for invasive Eurasian water milfoil. By 2011, the control was determined to be a successful as the native coontail became the dominant aquatic species. Other aquatic plants found in the lake include Elodea nuttallii and Najas guadalupensis.
