= Sail Harbor, Connecticut =

Census-designated place in Connecticut, United States

- Census-designated place
- Location within the Western Connecticut Planning Region and the state of Connecticut

- Location within Connecticut Location within the United States
- Coordinates: 41°31′35″N 73°27′54″W
- Country: United States
- State: Connecticut
- County: Fairfield
- Towns: New Fairfield; Sherman

Area
  - Total: 0.63 sq mi (1.63 km^{2})
  - Land: 0.47 sq mi (1.21 km^{2})
  - Water: 0.16 sq mi (0.41 km^{2})
- Elevation: 440 ft (130 m)
- Time zone: UTC-5 (Eastern (EST))
  - Summer (DST): UTC-4 (EDT)
- ZIP Code: 06812 (New Fairfield); 06784 (Sherman)
- Area codes: 203/475
- FIPS code: 09-66113
- GNIS feature ID: 2805965

Sail Harbor is a census-designated place (CDP) in the towns of New Fairfield and Sherman, Fairfield County, Connecticut, United States. It is in the northeastern corner of New Fairfield and the southeastern corner of Sherman, on Great Neck and Shelter Harbor, landforms on the west side of Candlewood Lake. It is bordered to the west by Inglenook. As of the 2020 census, Sail Harbor had a population of 175.

Sail Harbor was first listed as a CDP prior to the 2020 census.
