= Bigelow Corners, Connecticut =

Census-designated place in Connecticut, United States

- Census-designated place
- Location within the Western Connecticut Planning Region and the state of Connecticut

- Location within Connecticut Location within the United States
- Coordinates: 41°28′18″N 73°30′16″W
- Country: United States
- State: Connecticut
- County: Fairfield
- Town: New Fairfield

Area
  - Total: 0.67 sq mi (1.74 km^{2})
  - Land: 0.67 sq mi (1.73 km^{2})
  - Water: 0 sq mi (0.0 km^{2})
- Elevation: 653 ft (199 m)
- Time zone: UTC-5 (Eastern (EST))
  - Summer (DST): UTC-4 (EDT)
- ZIP Code: 06812 (New Fairfield)
- Area codes: 203/475
- FIPS code: 09-04965
- GNIS feature ID: 2805929

Bigelow Corners is a census-designated place (CDP) in the town of New Fairfield, Fairfield County, Connecticut, United States. It is in the southwestern quadrant of the town, northwest of the village of New Fairfield and east of Ball Pond.

Bigelow Corners was first listed as a CDP prior to the 2020 census. As of the 2020 census, Bigelow Corners had a population of 617.
