= Bogus Hill, Connecticut =

Census-designated place in Connecticut, United States

- Census-designated place
- Location within the Western Connecticut Planning Region and the state of Connecticut

- Location within Connecticut Location within the United States
- Coordinates: 41°30′26″N 73°27′44″W
- Country: United States
- State: Connecticut
- County: Fairfield
- Town: New Fairfield

Area
  - Total: 0.17 sq mi (0.45 km^{2})
  - Land: 0.10 sq mi (0.26 km^{2})
  - Water: 0.073 sq mi (0.19 km^{2})
- Elevation: 530 ft (160 m)
- Time zone: UTC-5 (Eastern (EST))
  - Summer (DST): UTC-4 (EDT)
- ZIP Code: 06812 (New Fairfield)
- Area codes: 203/475
- FIPS code: 09-06155
- GNIS feature ID: 2805930

Bogus Hill is a census-designated place (CDP) in the town of New Fairfield, Fairfield County, Connecticut, United States. It is in the northeastern part of the town, on a hill of the same name occupying a peninsula in Candlewood Lake. It is bordered to the southwest, across Squantz Cove, by Knollcrest.

Bogus Hill was first listed as a CDP prior to the 2020 census. As of the 2020 census, Bogus Hill had a population of 100.
