= Knollcrest, Connecticut =

Census-designated place in Connecticut, United States

- Census-designated place
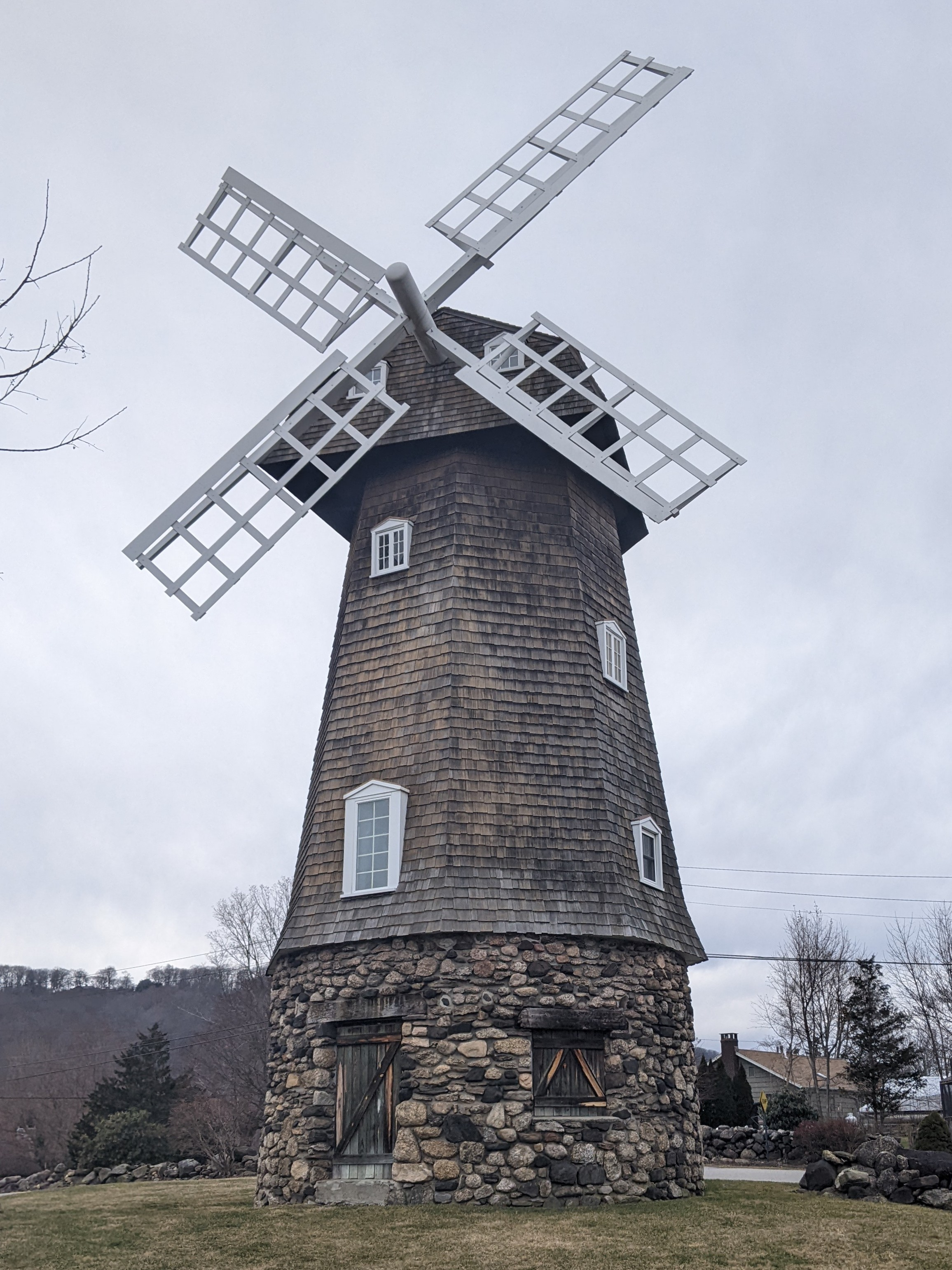
- Windmill at Knollcrest

- Location within the Western Connecticut Planning Region and the state of Connecticut

- Location within Connecticut Location within the United States
- Coordinates: 41°30′4″N 73°28′0″W
- Country: United States
- State: Connecticut
- Counties: Fairfield
- Region: Western CT
- Town: New Fairfield

Area
  - Total: 0.17 sq mi (0.44 km^{2})
  - Land: 0.17 sq mi (0.44 km^{2})
  - Water: 0 sq mi (0.0 km^{2})
- Elevation: 500 ft (150 m)
- Time zone: UTC-5 (Eastern (EST))
  - Summer (DST): UTC-4 (EDT)
- ZIP Code: 06812 (New Fairfield)
- Area codes: 203/475
- FIPS code: 09-40920
- GNIS feature ID: 2805950
- Website: www.knollcrestboard.org

Knollcrest is a census-designated place (CDP) in the town of New Fairfield, Fairfield County, Connecticut, United States. It is in the northeastern part of the town, on a peninsula on the western side of Candlewood Lake. It is bordered to the northeast, across Squantz Cove, by Bogus Hill. As of the 2020 census, Knollcrest had a population of 334.

Knollcrest was first listed as a CDP prior to the 2020 census. The community was established in 1936.

== Windmill ==
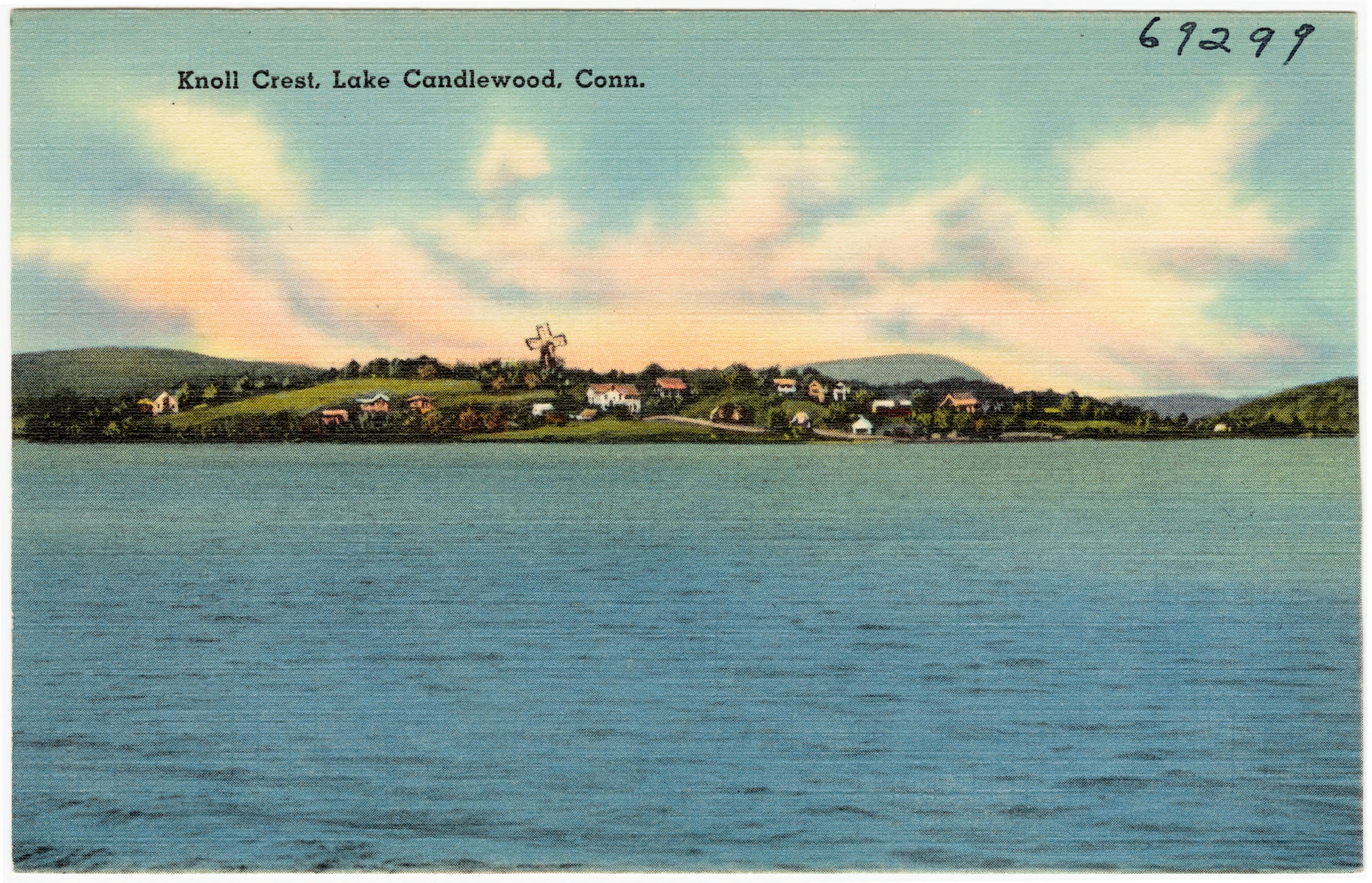
Historic postcard depicting Knollcrest

Knollcrest is known for its Dutch-style windmill. It was constructed in 1936 as a functional water pump. The structure is 80 feet tall and houses a 3,000 gallon copper water tank. The windmill currently serves as the main office for the community. It was commissioned by the Homelander Company and was designed by Charles A. Federer.
