= Inglenook, Connecticut =

Census-designated place in Connecticut, United States

- Census-designated place
- Location within the Western Connecticut Planning Region and the state of Connecticut

- Location within Connecticut Location within the United States
- Coordinates: 41°31′23″N 73°28′24″W
- Country: United States
- State: Connecticut
- County: Fairfield
- Town: New Fairfield

Area
  - Total: 0.44 sq mi (1.14 km^{2})
  - Land: 0.44 sq mi (1.14 km^{2})
  - Water: 0 sq mi (0.0 km^{2})
- Elevation: 840 ft (260 m)
- Time zone: UTC-5 (Eastern (EST))
  - Summer (DST): UTC-4 (EDT)
- ZIP Code: 06812 (New Fairfield)
- Area codes: 203/475
- FIPS code: 09-39747
- GNIS feature ID: 2805946

Inglenook is a census-designated place (CDP) in the town of New Fairfield, Fairfield County, Connecticut, United States. It is in the northeastern part of the town, atop a broad peninsula in Candlewood Lake. Inglenook is bordered to the east by Sail Harbor and to the north by the town of Sherman.

As of the 2020 census, Inglenook had a population of 799.

Inglenook was first listed as a CDP prior to the 2020 census.
