= Candlewood Orchards, Connecticut =

Census-designated place in Connecticut, United States

- Census-designated place
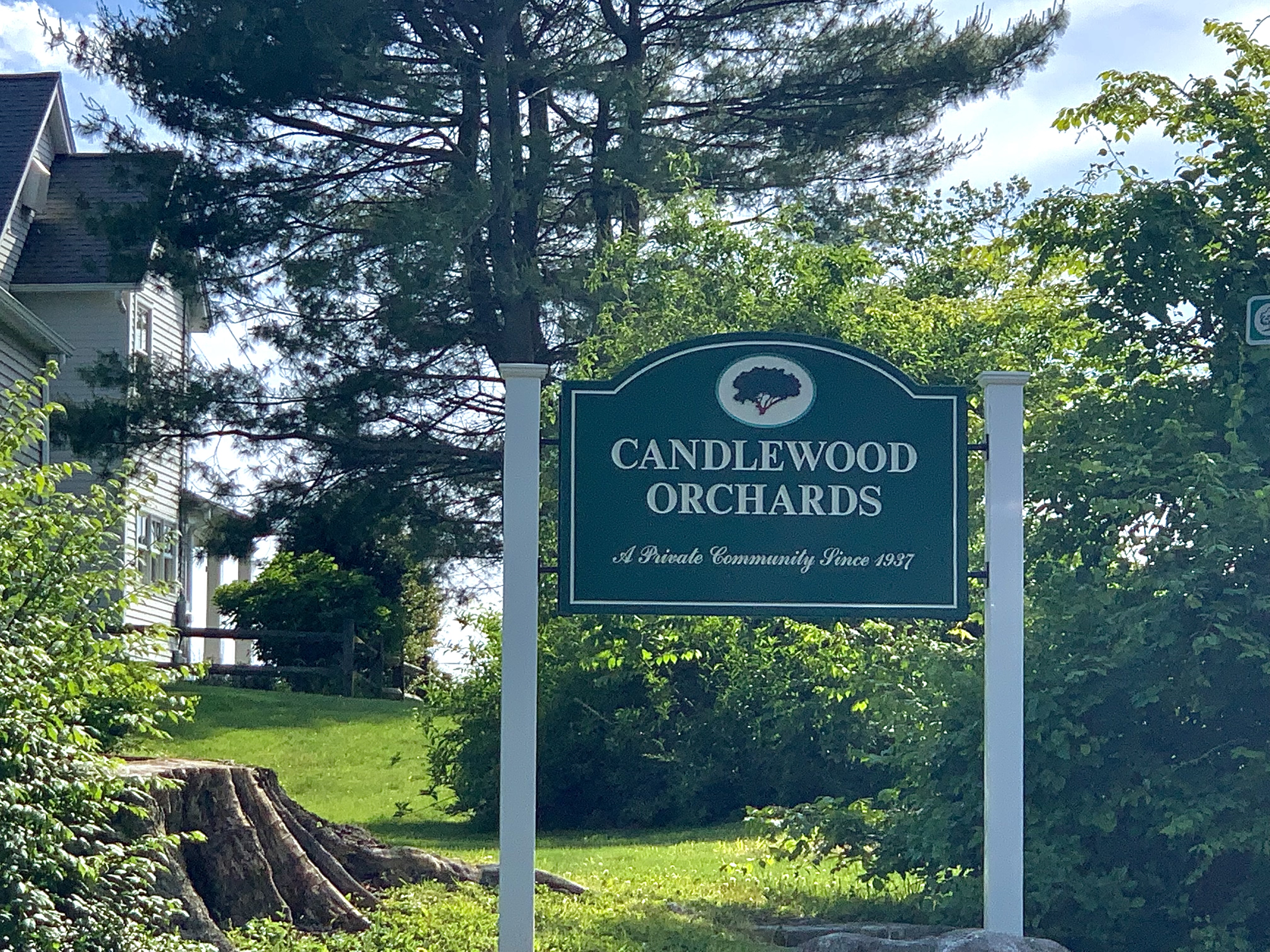
- Sign at Main Entrance

- Location within the Western Connecticut Planning Region and the state of Connecticut

- Location within Connecticut Location within the United States
- Coordinates: 41°28′30″N 73°26′24″W
- Country: United States
- State: Connecticut
- Counties: Fairfield
- Region: Western CT
- Town: Brookfield

Area
  - Total: 0.29 sq mi (0.75 km^{2})
  - Land: 0.29 sq mi (0.75 km^{2})
  - Water: 0 sq mi (0.0 km^{2})
- Elevation: 450 ft (140 m)
- Time zone: UTC-5 (Eastern (EST))
  - Summer (DST): UTC-4 (EDT)
- ZIP Code: 06804 (Brookfield)
- Area codes: 203/475
- FIPS code: 09-11640
- GNIS feature ID: 2805938

Candlewood Orchards is a private residential community and census-designated place (CDP) in the town of Brookfield, Fairfield County, Connecticut, United States. It is in the northwestern part of the town, on the eastern shore of Candlewood Lake. It is bordered to the north by Candlewood Shores and to the west and south by the town of New Fairfield.

Candlewood Orchards was first listed as a CDP prior to the 2020 census. As of the 2020 census, Candlewood Orchards had a population of 752.
