= Williams House (New Fairfield, Connecticut) =

Historic house in Connecticut, United States

- U.S. National Register of Historic Places
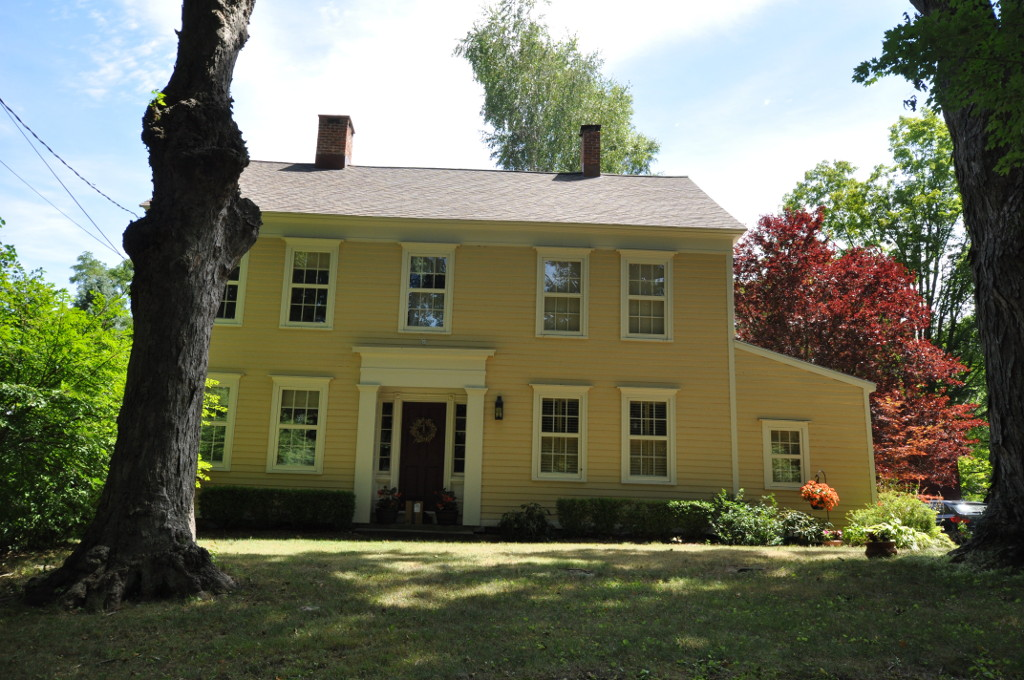

- Location within Connecticut Location within the United States
- Location: 5 Williams Road, New Fairfield, Connecticut
- Coordinates: 41°27′22″N 73°29′33″W
- Area: 1.14 acres (0.46 ha)
- Built: c. 1830
- Architectural style: Greek Revival/Federal
- NRHP reference No.: 13000525
- Added to NRHP: May 4, 2014

The Williams House is a historic single-family residence located at 5 Williams Road in New Fairfield, Connecticut. Likely built between 1800 and 1835, it is a well-preserved example of early American residential architecture, with transitional Federal and Greek Revival features. The house was listed on the National Register of Historic Places in 2014.

== Description and history ==
The Williams House is located in a residential area southwest of the village center of New Fairfield, on the south side of Williams Road west of Barnum Road. It is a 2 1/2-story wood-frame structure, with a side gable roof, two brick chimneys, and a clapboarded exterior. Its main facade is five bays wide, with sash windows spaced evenly around a slightly off-center central entrance. Windows are topped by slightly projecting cornices, with a frieze band of trim separating the upper story windows from the main roof. The entrance is flanked by sidelight windows and Greek Revival pilasters, which rise to a corniced entablature. An integral single-story shed-roof ell extends to the right of the main block. The interior follows a center hall plan, with parlors on either side of the hall, with kitchen, dining room, and office behind. It retains many original interior features, including wide chestnut flooring, original plasterwork, and original doors and hardware.

The date of the building's construction is unknown, as the original paperwork documenting the completion of the structure was destroyed in an 1867 fire at the town hall. Various architects and historians place the construction between 1800 and 1835, and the National Park Service estimates the building was completed around 1830. The earliest known record of the building comes from an 1835 deed transfer found in neighboring Danbury.

The building is significant as it shows the transition between Greek Revival and Federal-style architecture. It was noted as being part of an important farm in the early days of the town.

== See also ==
- National Register of Historic Places listings in Fairfield County, Connecticut
