= Roy Gordon (Canadian chemist) =

J. Roy Gordon
- Born: James Roycroft Gordon; 26 May 1898; Kingston, Ontario, Canada
- Died: 4 April 1980 (aged 81); New Fairfield, Connecticut, U.S.
- Education: Queen's University (BS)
- Occupations: Metallurgist and business executive
- Known for: President of Inco Limited
- Spouse(s): Margaret Belle Arthur; Joan Ehretia Windus

James Roycroft Gordon (26 May 1898 – 4 April 1980) was a Canadian chemist and a research metallurgist who rose to become President of Inco Limited.

== Early years and military service ==
James Roycroft Gordon was born a Methodist in 1898 near Kingston, Ontario. He graduated from Queen's University in 1920 with a B.Sc. in Chemistry.

Gordon participated as a soldier from 16 May 1918 in the Canadian Expeditionary Force of World War I.

== Career ==
In 1936 he became associated with Inco as Director of the newly established Research Department at Copper Cliff.

Gordon was elected President of Inco in 1960.

Gordon was at one time or another, President and a Director of the Ontario Mining Association, President and a Director of Whitehead Metal Products, a Director of Canada Life Assurance, Page-Hersey Tubes, the Toronto-Dominion Bank, and the Toronto General Trusts.

== Recognition and legacy ==
Gordon was the recipient of the 1948 Medal of the Canadian Institute of Mining and Metallurgy.

Gordon was awarded the AIME James Douglas Gold Medal in 1958.

Gordon was fêted by the Canadian Club on 30 November 1964 as he delivered a lecture entitled "Canada - The Common Market - and World Trade".

In December 1967 INCO inaugurated the J. Roy Gordon laboratory in Sheridan Park for its research in extractive metallurgy. By 2002 it had developed into a jewel responsible for many of the recent innovations in the field.
