= Kellogg Point, Connecticut =

Census-designated place in Connecticut, United States

- Census-designated place
- Location within the Western Connecticut Planning Region and the state of Connecticut

- Location within Connecticut Location within the United States
- Coordinates: 41°28′5″N 73°27′35″W
- Country: United States
- State: Connecticut
- Counties: Fairfield
- Region: Western CT
- Town: New Fairfield

Area
  - Total: 0.046 sq mi (0.12 km^{2})
  - Land: 0.046 sq mi (0.12 km^{2})
  - Water: 0 sq mi (0.0 km^{2})
- Elevation: 500 ft (150 m)
- Time zone: UTC-5 (Eastern (EST))
  - Summer (DST): UTC-4 (EDT)
- ZIP Code: 06812 (New Fairfield)
- Area codes: 203/475
- FIPS code: 09-40077
- GNIS feature ID: 2805948

Kellogg Point is a census-designated place (CDP) in the town of New Fairfield, Fairfield County, Connecticut, United States. It is in the southeastern part of the town, on the western shore of Candlewood Lake, and is 6 miles (10 km) north of the center of Danbury. As of the 2020 census, Kellogg Point had a population of 20.

Kellogg Point was first listed as a CDP prior to the 2020 census.
