= Taylor Corners, Connecticut =

Census-designated place in Connecticut, United States

- Census-designated place
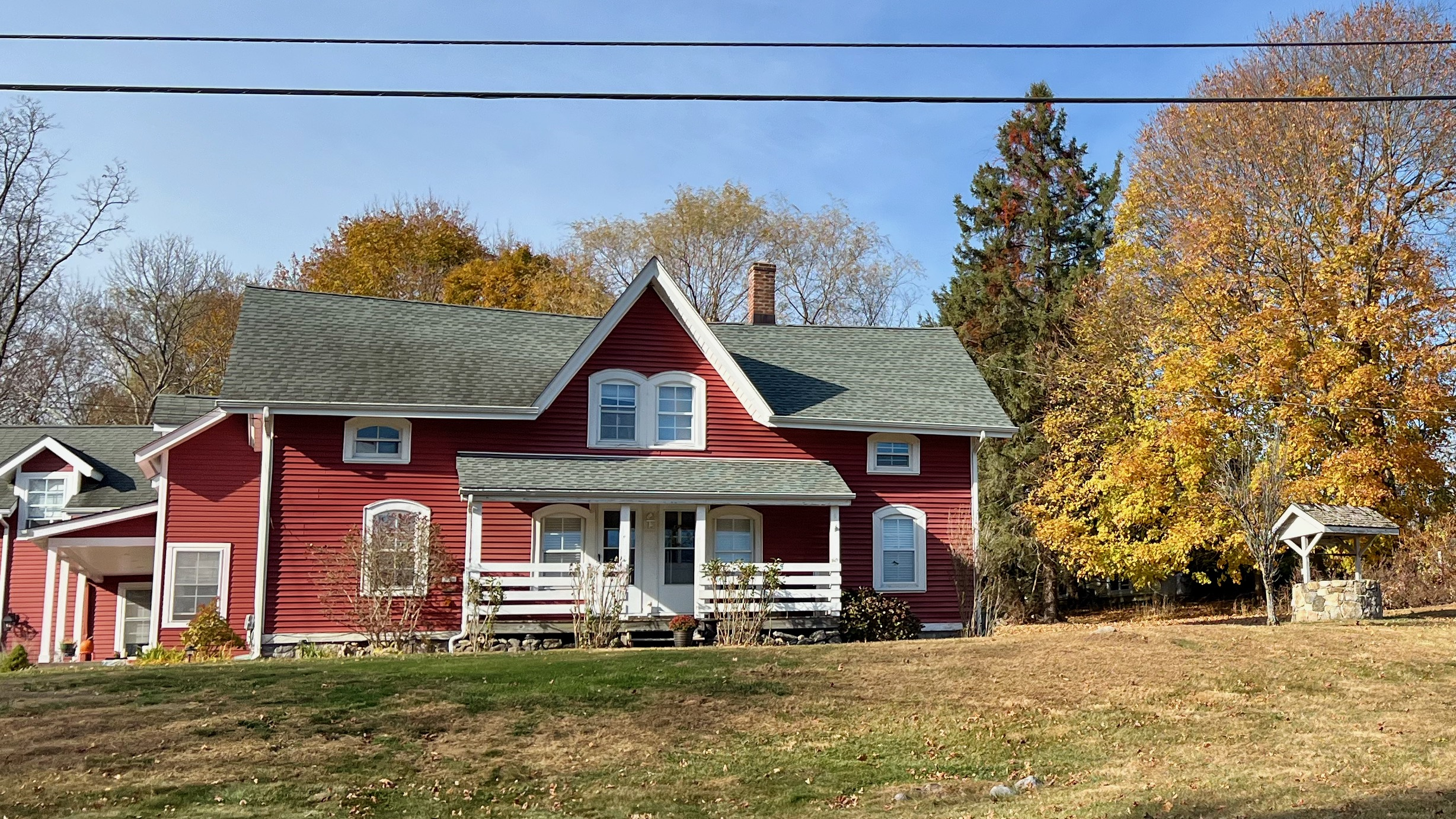
- Rural dwelling at Milltown and Ball Pond Road

- Location within the Western Connecticut Planning Region and the state of Connecticut

- Location within Connecticut Location within the United States
- Coordinates: 41°26′49″N 73°31′29″W
- Country: United States
- State: Connecticut
- County: Fairfield
- Town: New Fairfield

Area
  - Total: 0.50 sq mi (1.29 km^{2})
  - Land: 0.50 sq mi (1.29 km^{2})
  - Water: 0 sq mi (0.0 km^{2})
- Elevation: 780 ft (240 m)
- Time zone: UTC-5 (Eastern (EST))
  - Summer (DST): UTC-4 (EDT)
- ZIP Code: 06812 (New Fairfield)
- Area codes: 203/475
- FIPS code: 09-75065
- GNIS feature ID: 2805971

Taylor Corners is a census-designated place (CDP) in the town of New Fairfield, Connecticut, United States. It is in the southwestern corner of the town, bordered to the south by the city of Danbury, to the north by Ball Pond, and to the west by the town of Southeast in Putnam County, New York.

Taylor Corners was first listed as a CDP prior to the 2020 census. As of the 2020 census, Taylor Corners had a population of 645.
