= New Fairfield Historical District =

Coordinates: 41.4681°N 73.4901°W

The New Fairfield Historical District is in New Fairfield, Connecticut, United States. In 2005, the newly created state-funded Connecticut Commission on Culture and Tourism awarded its first Endangered Properties Grant to the Town of New Fairfield. The $50,000 grant was used to relocate and preserve the Parsonage and the Gideon Hubbell House, two historically significant State Register properties threatened with demolition. Both properties were to be adapted for reuse as part of New Fairfield’s new community center, the first step in the creation of a living history village and town center. The houses were moved to their new location on March 4, 2007.

== Gideon Hubbell House ==
The Gideon Hubbell house is of interest because it is one of the oldest buildings in the area and a good example of Greek Revival architecture, and because when Gideon died in 1838 the probate of his will left a complete inventory of his personal property, from the family cow to the last pair of velvet trousers. This information enables the possible restoration of the house as a typical homestead of the beginning of the 19th century.

== The Parsonage ==
Abel F. Beardsley took residence of The Parsonage as a manufacturer of lightning rods. Most of the town's records burned in a fire at the town clerk's home in 1867, so the exact date of the Beardsley house is unknown. Experts can place it somewhere around 1840 with parts of it being perhaps earlier. The property went through successive owners until Lavenia Jennings sold it to the Congregational Church of New Fairfield in 1903 for $1,000. It was then used as the pastor's home, The Parsonage, until the 1950s - half a century!

The Parsonage was also used as a meeting place for educational, charity and social events. According to the Danbury Evening News on September 9, 1908, "A number of ladies met at the Parsonage yesterday afternoon for the purpose of organizing a Ladies Aid Society." In the early 1900s, the Woman's Christian Temperance Union (WCTU) met in the parlor of The Parsonage. Years later, a woodworking club for boys was offered there with the pastor serving as instructor and shop steward. Girls in town would attend the Hobby Club. The building also served as an informal teen center in the 1940s and 1950s.
