= Candlewood Knolls, Connecticut =

Census-designated place in Connecticut, United States

- Census-designated place

- Location within the Western Connecticut Planning Region and the state of Connecticut

- Location within Connecticut Location within the United States
- Coordinates: 41°28′45″N 73°27′48″W
- Country: United States
- State: Connecticut
- Counties: Fairfield
- Region: Western CT
- Town: New Fairfield

Area
  - Total: 0.15 sq mi (0.39 km^{2})
  - Land: 0.15 sq mi (0.39 km^{2})
  - Water: 0 sq mi (0.0 km^{2})
- Elevation: 450 ft (140 m)
- Time zone: UTC-5 (Eastern (EST))
  - Summer (DST): UTC-4 (EDT)
- ZIP Code: 06812 (New Fairfield)
- Area codes: 203/475
- FIPS code: 09-11430
- GNIS feature ID: 2805936
- Website: www.candlewoodknolls.com

Candlewood Knolls is a census-designated place (CDP) in the town of New Fairfield, Fairfield County, Connecticut, United States. It is in the southeastern part of the town, on the western shore of Candlewood Lake. As of the 2020 census, Candlewood Knolls had a population of 255.

Candlewood Knolls was first listed as a CDP prior to the 2020 census.
