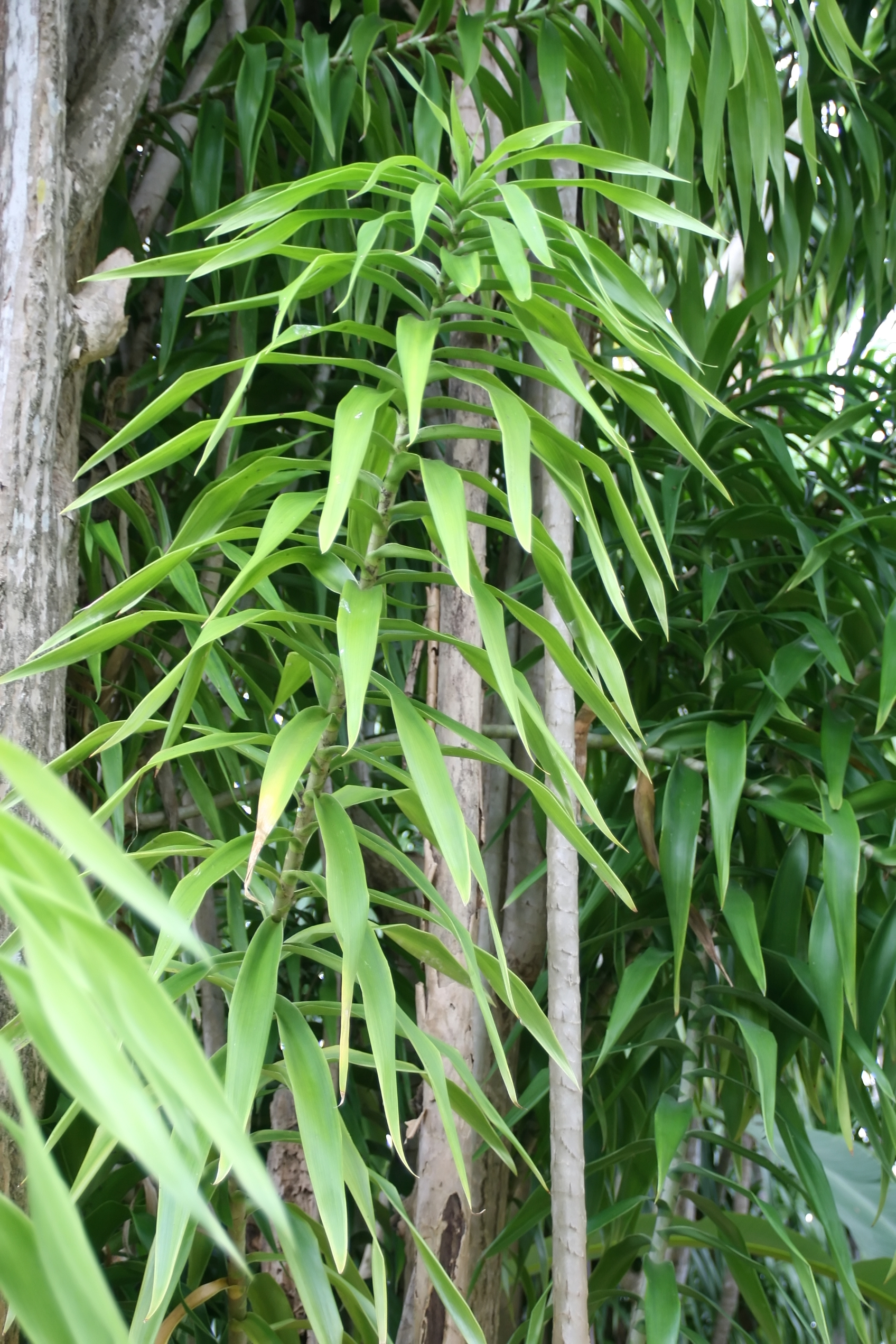
- Location taken:Fairchild Tropical Botanic Garden, Miami

Conservation status
- Least Concern (IUCN 3.1)

Scientific classification
- Kingdom: Plantae
- Clade: Tracheophytes
- Clade: Angiosperms
- Clade: Monocots
- Order: Asparagales
- Family: Asparagaceae
- Subfamily: Convallarioideae
- Genus: Dracaena
- Species: D. americana

Binomial name
- Dracaena americana Donn.Sm. 1905

Synonyms
- Dracaena ghiesbreghtii (W.Bull ex J.J.Blandy 1862)

= Dracaena americana =

Species of plant

Dracaena americana, the Central American dragon tree or candlewood, is a neotropical tree in the genus Dracaena, native to southern Mexico, Guatemala, Panama, Honduras, Belize, Costa Rica, and Colombia. It is one of only two Dracaena species native to the Americas, the other being Dracaena cubensis.

== Description ==
Dracaena americana reaches a typical maximum height of 12 meters with a multi-stem habit; newer stem growth exhibits leaf scars, whereas older growth exhibits an exfoliating bark. The bright green straplike leaves are soft, up to 35 cm long and 2.5 cm wide, and are borne along the length of the stems, rather than the tufted habit typical of Dracaena. While capable of attaining an arborescent form up to 18 m, in drier or more open areas D. americana is more typically a prostrate understory shrub. D. americana flowers in spring with a creamy white paniculate inflorescence 20–30 cm long, followed by yellow or red fruit in fall.

== Taxonomy ==
As of 2022, Plants of the World Online treats Dracaena americana as a synonym of Dracaena ghiesbreghtii, based on an earlier publication from the Royal Horticultural Society.

== Distribution and habitat ==
With a wide distribution primarily in the humid tropical rainforest of Central America and southern Mexico, Dracaena americana is notable for its broad elevational range from sea level to 1,900 meters in the Colombian Andes. It has also been introduced to Ecuador. D. americana is usually found as isolated plants growing in rendzina soils, in areas that receive more than 1,500 mm of rainfall.

D. americana has been cultivated as an ornamental plant since the 19th century.

== Ecology ==
The fruit is sweet and is eaten by a variety of animals, including birds and the Yucatán black howler monkey. It is therefore likely that animals play an important role in seed dispersal.

== Gallery ==
Additional images
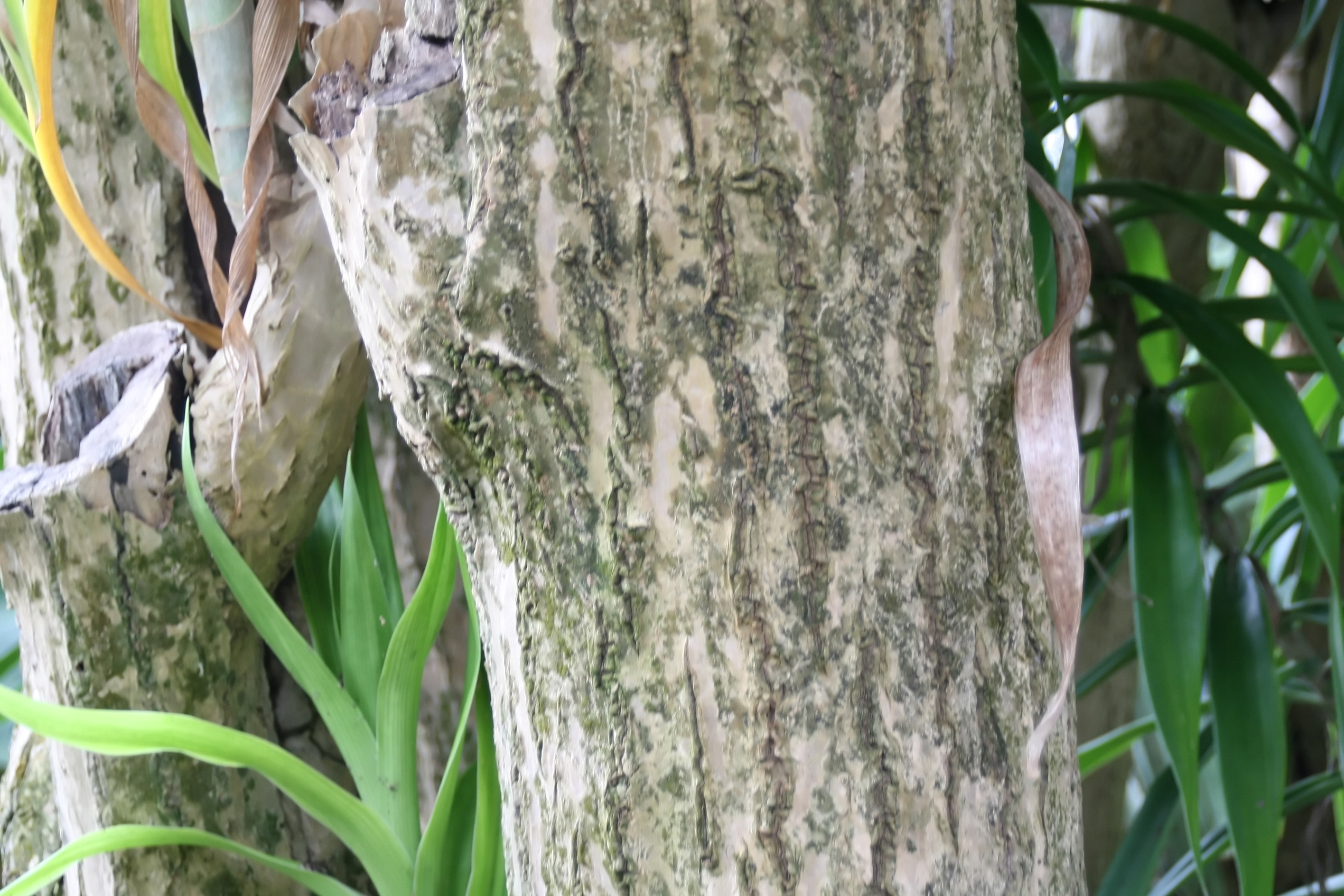
Detail of exfoliating bark

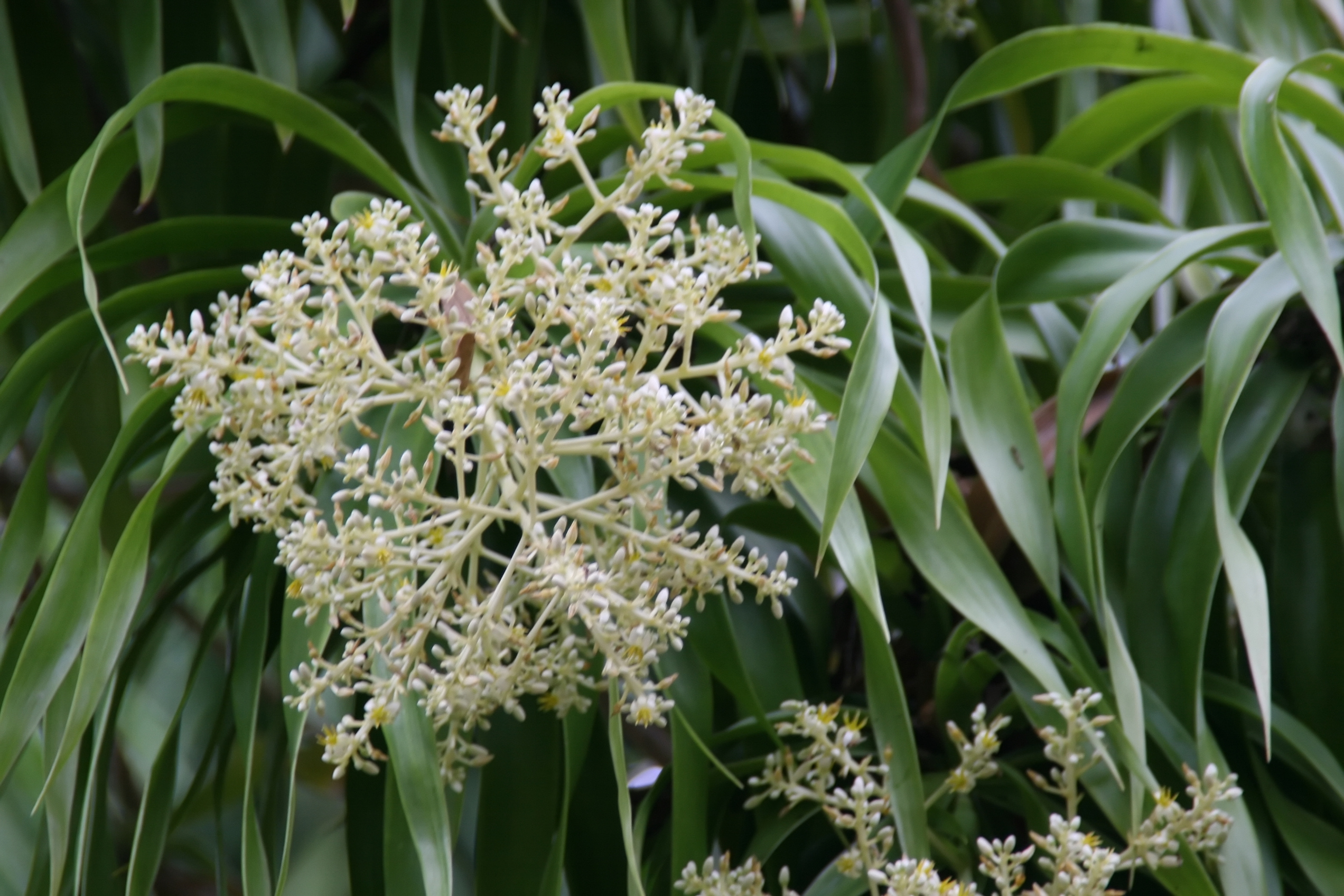
Inflorescence with clusters of small creamy white flowers

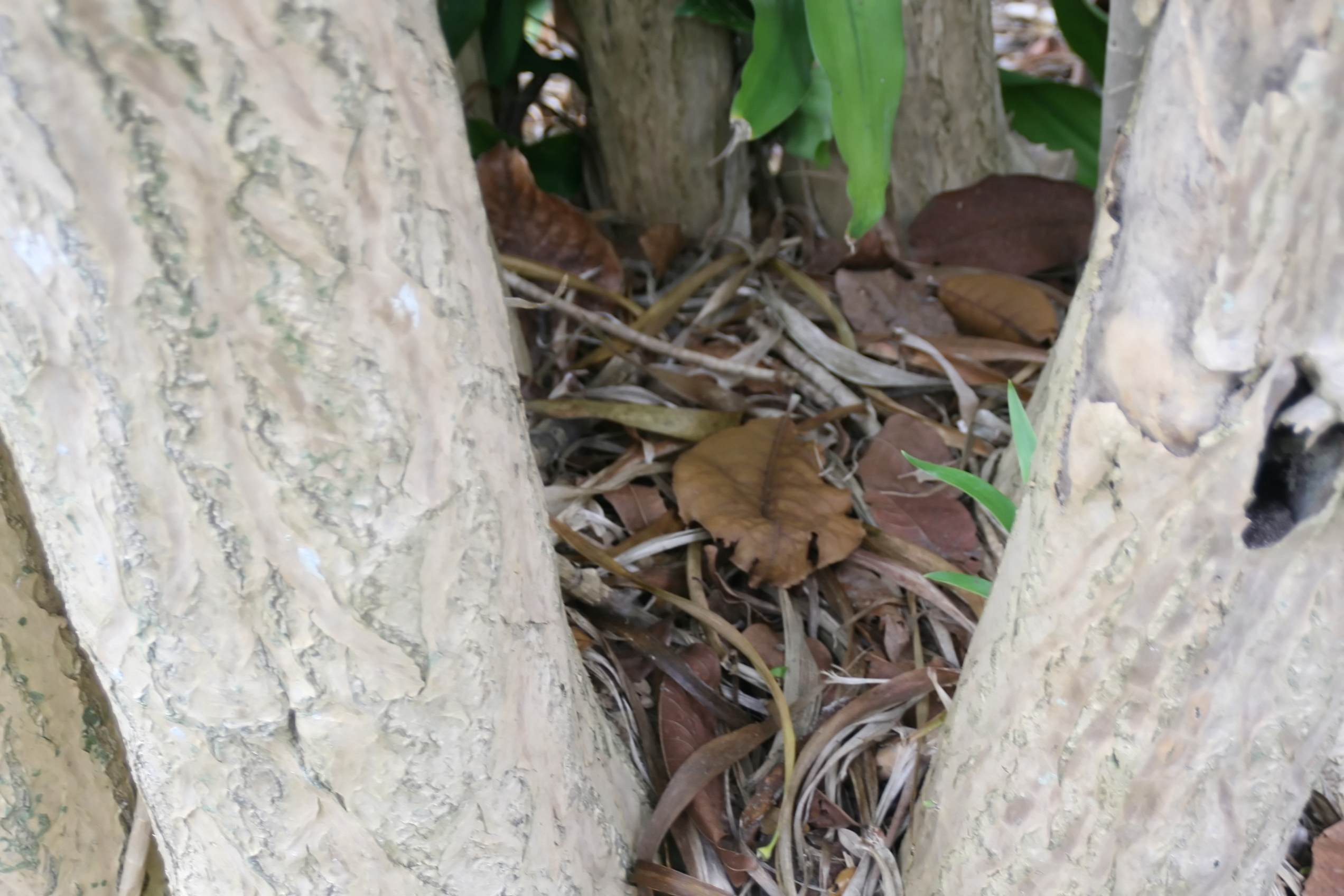
Base of trunk

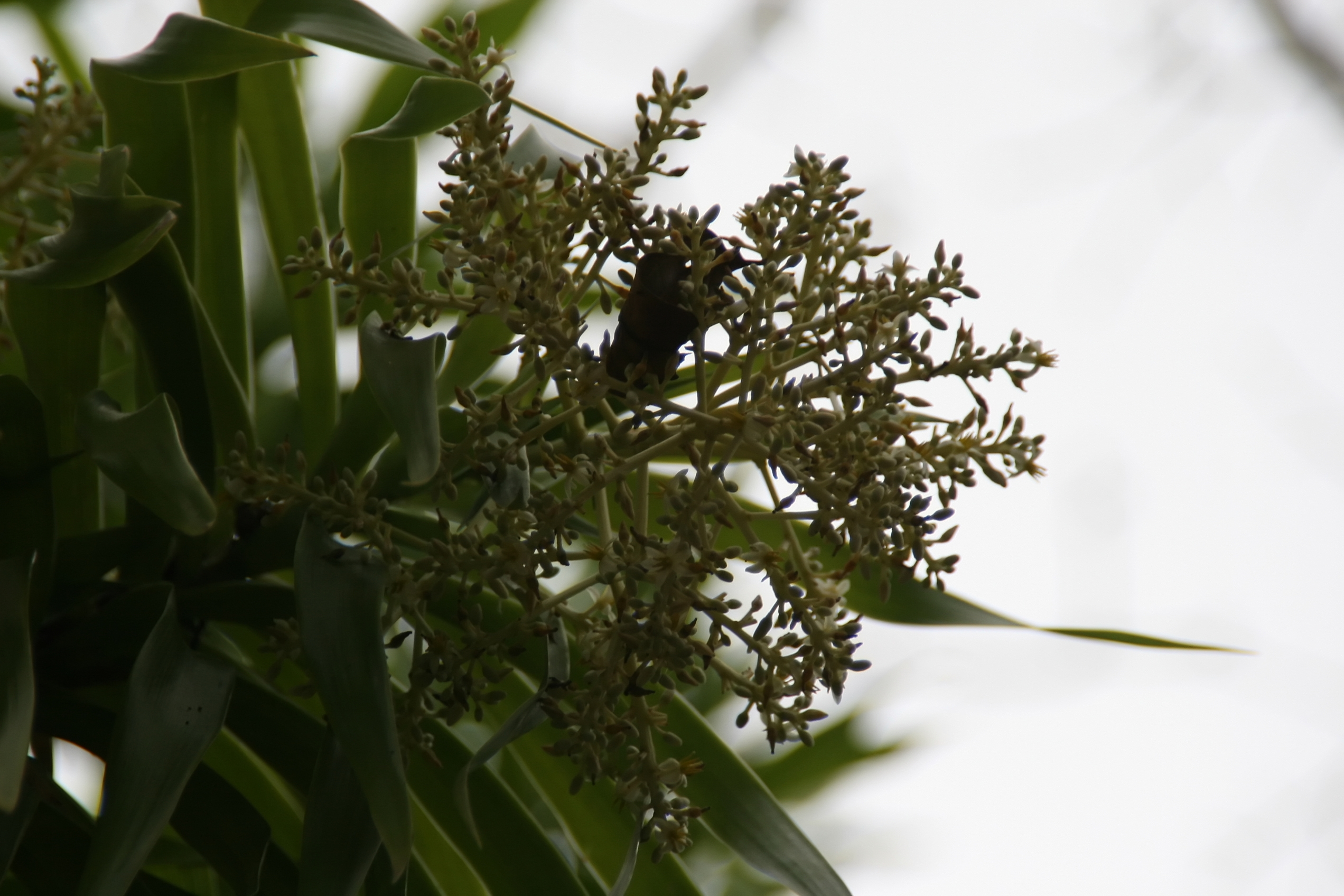
Detail of inflorescence, showing paniculate form

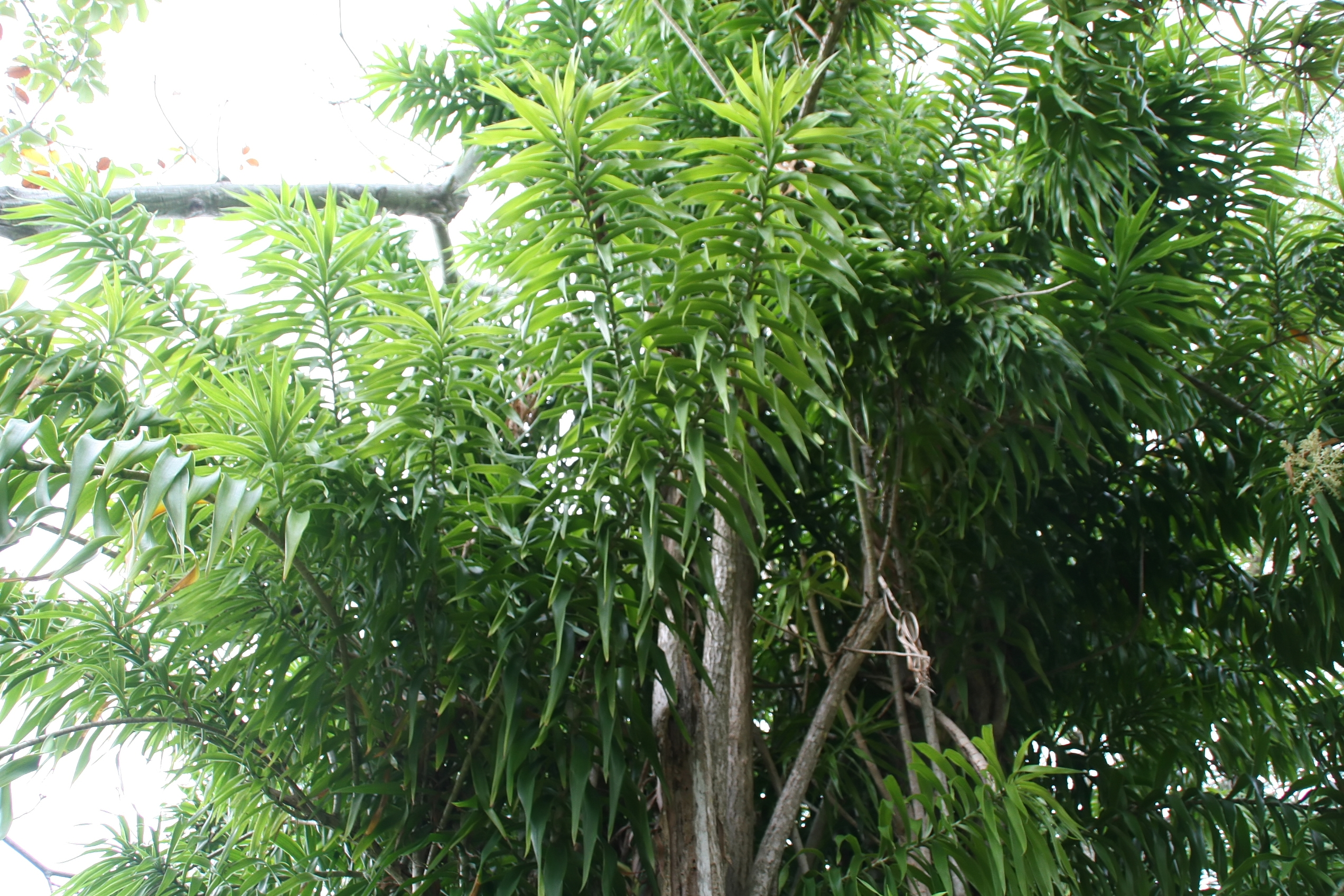
Dracaena americana exhibiting multi-stemmed habit

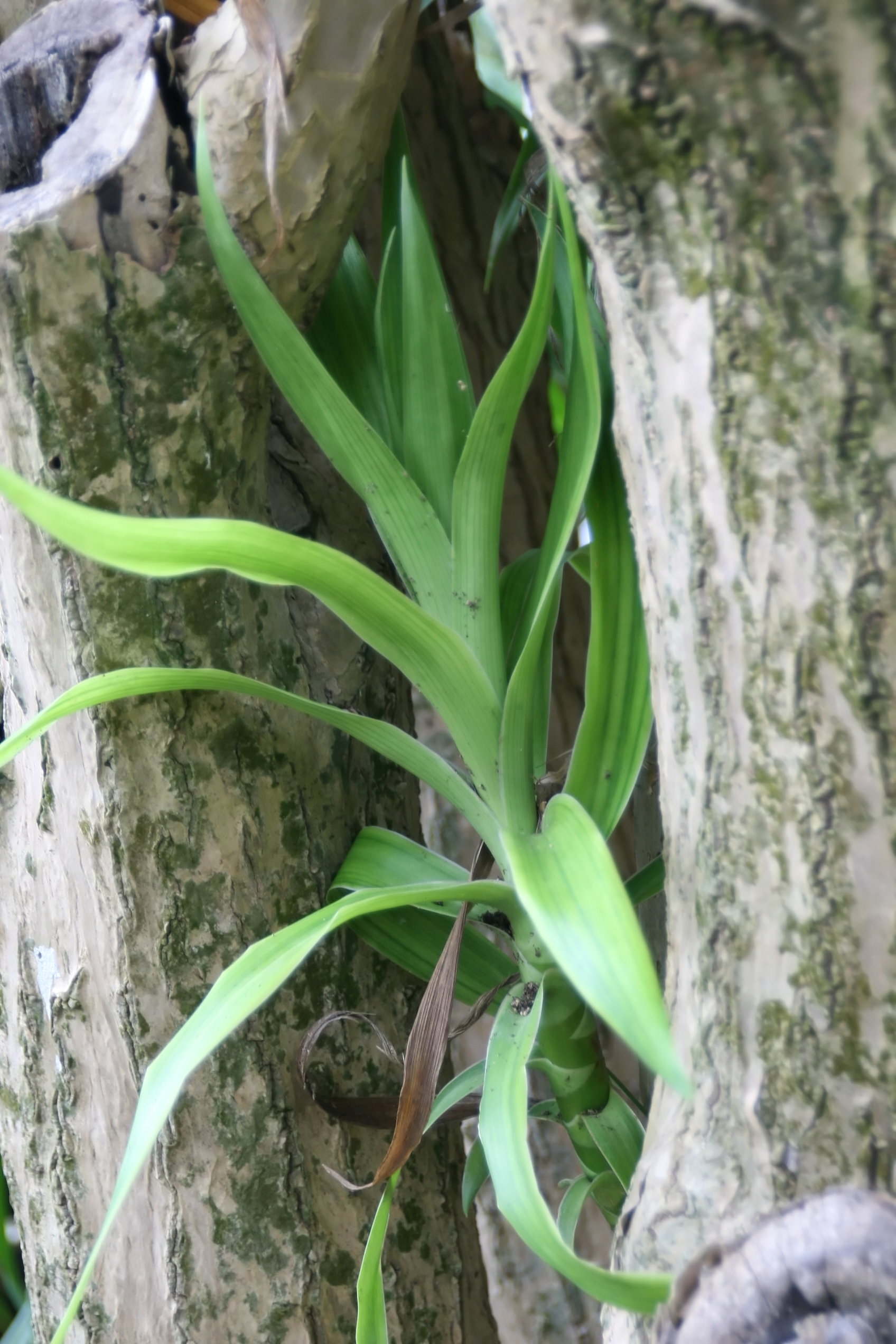
Younger growth contrasted against older stems
