= Ball Pond, Connecticut =

Census-designated place in Connecticut, United States

- Census-designated place
- Location within the Western Connecticut Planning Region and the state of Connecticut

- Location within Connecticut Location within the United States
- Coordinates: 41°27′49″N 73°31′36″W
- Country: United States
- State: Connecticut
- Counties: Fairfield
- Region: Western CT
- Town: New Fairfield

Area
  - Total: 1.25 sq mi (3.25 km^{2})
  - Land: 1.13 sq mi (2.92 km^{2})
  - Water: 0.13 sq mi (0.33 km^{2})
- Elevation: 784 ft (239 m)

Population (2020)
  - Total: 2,189
- Time zone: UTC-5 (Eastern (EST))
  - Summer (DST): UTC-4 (EDT)
- ZIP Code: 06812 (New Fairfield)
- Area codes: 203/475
- FIPS code: 09-02480
- GNIS feature ID: 2805928

Ball Pond is a census-designated place (CDP) in the town of New Fairfield, Fairfield County, Connecticut, United States. It is in the southwestern part of the town, with the pond of the same name in the central part of the CDP. The community is bordered to the south by Taylor Corners and to the west by Putnam Lake in Putnam County, New York.

As of the 2020 census, Ball Pond had a population of 2,189.

Ball Pond was first listed as a CDP prior to the 2020 census.

== Demographics ==
=== 2020 census ===
As of the 2020 census, Ball Pond had a population of 2,189. The median age was 46.3 years. 19.5% of residents were under the age of 18 and 17.2% of residents were 65 years of age or older. For every 100 females there were 98.1 males, and for every 100 females age 18 and over there were 98.9 males age 18 and over.

100.0% of residents lived in urban areas, while 0.0% lived in rural areas.

There were 815 households in Ball Pond, of which 30.7% had children under the age of 18 living in them. Of all households, 64.0% were married-couple households, 11.4% were households with a male householder and no spouse or partner present, and 19.3% were households with a female householder and no spouse or partner present. About 20.9% of all households were made up of individuals and 11.3% had someone living alone who was 65 years of age or older.

There were 882 housing units, of which 7.6% were vacant. The homeowner vacancy rate was 0.9% and the rental vacancy rate was 9.8%.

Racial composition as of the 2020 census
Race	Number	Percent
White	1,796	82.0%
Black or African American	38	1.7%
American Indian and Alaska Native	6	0.3%
Asian	27	1.2%
Native Hawaiian and Other Pacific Islander	2	0.1%
Some other race	127	5.8%
Two or more races	193	8.8%
Hispanic or Latino (of any race)	279	12.7%
