= Rocky River (Connecticut) =

River in Connecticut, United States

The Rocky River is very short and small tributary of the Housatonic River in the U.S. state of Connecticut. It flows into the Housatonic River from the west just upstream from New Milford at 41°35′00″N 73°26′23″W

Historically, the Rocky River flowed South from Sherman before looping northward to join the Housatonic River. The historic Rocky River was dammed at its original junction with the Housatonic to create the Candlewood Lake hydro electric pumped storage generation reservoir.

== See also ==
- List of rivers of Connecticut
