= New Fairfield, Connecticut =

Town in Connecticut, United States

- Town
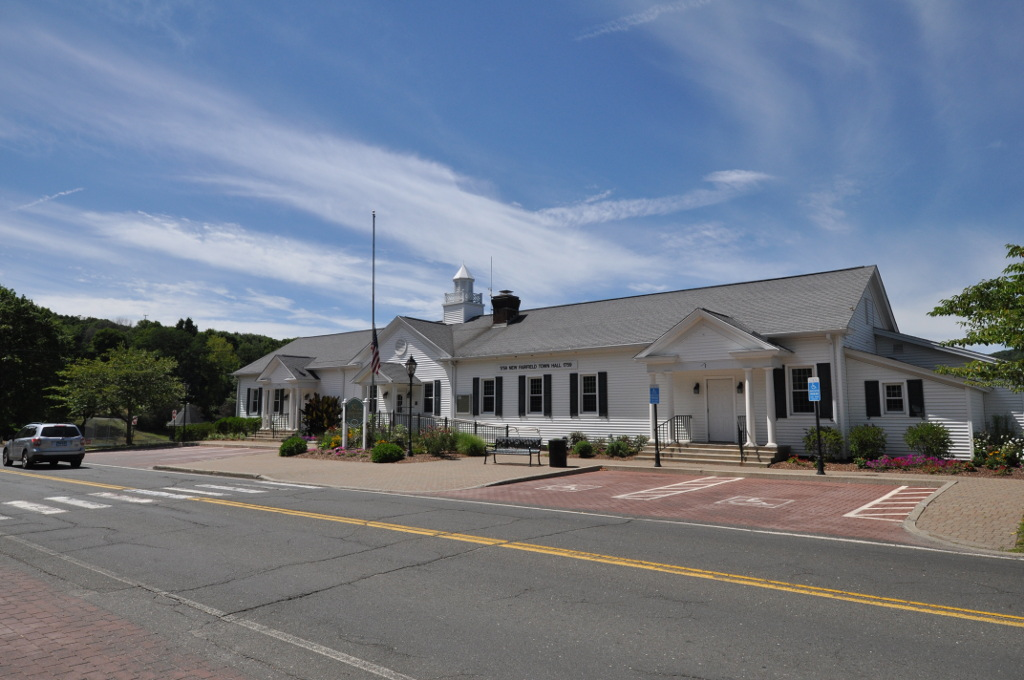
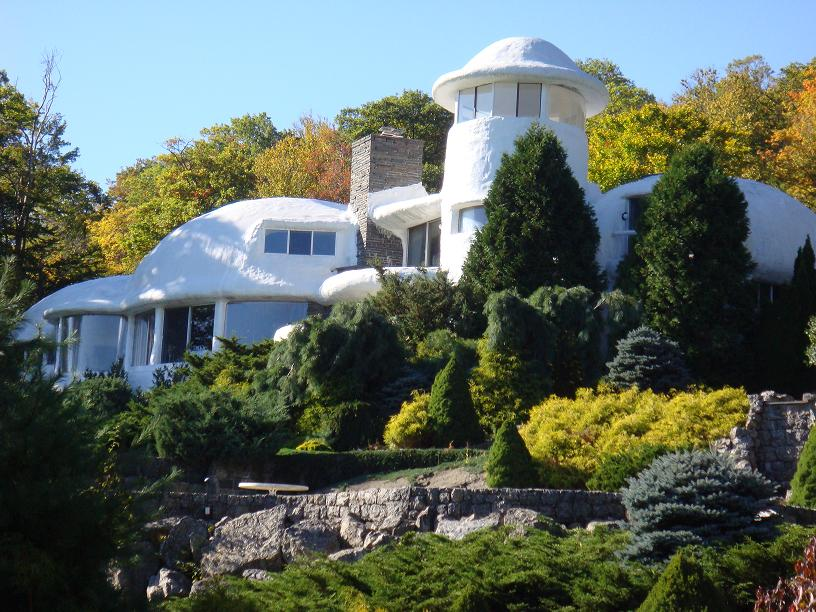
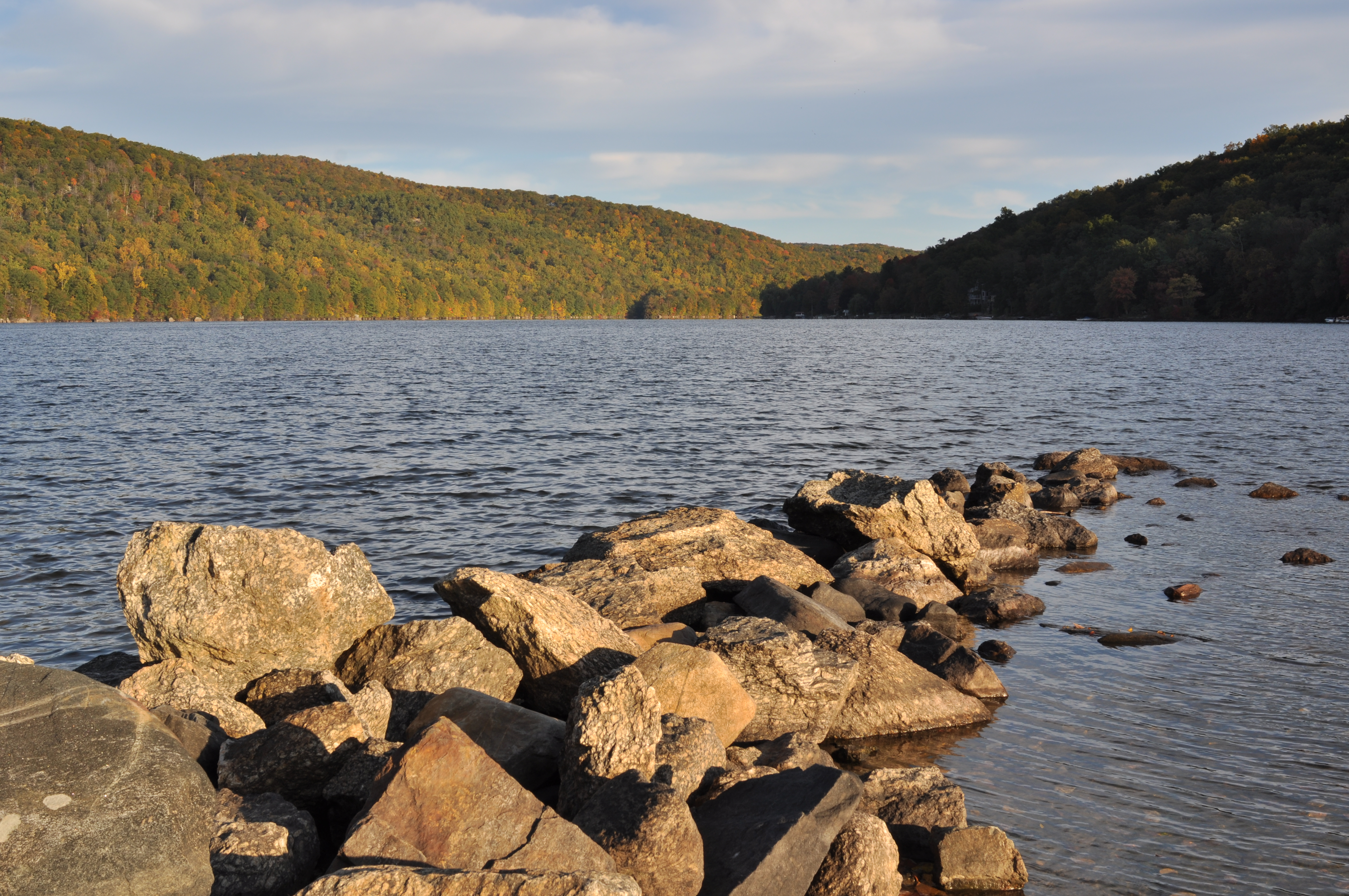
- Town Hall Star Castle Squantz Pond State Park

- Seal

- Coordinates: 41°29′N 73°29′W
- Country: United States
- U.S. state: Connecticut
- County: Fairfield
- Region: Western CT
- Incorporated: 1740

Government
  - Type: Select board-Town meeting
  - First selectman: Patricia Del Monaco (D)
  - Selectman: Khris Hall (D)
  - Selectman: Jon Russo (R)

Area
  - Total: 25.1 sq mi (65.0 km^{2})
  - Land: 20.5 sq mi (53.0 km^{2})
  - Water: 4.6 sq mi (11.9 km^{2})
- Elevation: 750 ft (230 m)

Population (2020)
  - Total: 13,579
  - Density: 664/sq mi (256.2/km^{2})
- Time zone: UTC-5 (Eastern)
  - Summer (DST): UTC-4 (Eastern)
- ZIP Code: 06812
- Area codes: 203/475
- FIPS code: 09-50860
- GNIS feature ID: 0213469
- Website: www.newfairfield.org

New Fairfield is a town in Fairfield County, Connecticut, United States. The population was 13,579 at the 2020 census. New Fairfield is one of five towns that surround Candlewood Lake, the largest lake in Connecticut. The town is located 55 miles (89 km) northeast of New York City, making it part of the New York metropolitan area. The town is part of the Western Connecticut Planning Region.

== History ==
In pre-colonial times, the indigenous people of New Fairfield were part of an alliance of tribes that extended from the source of the Housatonic to the sea.

In 1724, colonial settlers from Fairfield, Connecticut, received approval from the General Assembly of the Colony of Connecticut to establish a new township. According to one account, they negotiated with Chief Squantz of the Schaghticoke tribe of Algonquian lineage. Alternatively, it is told that they did not negotiate with Chief Squantz because he moved to the north end of Squantz Pond land area and refused to "sell" the township of New Fairfield. They returned in the Spring of 1725, but found that Chief Squantz had died during the winter. His four sons and heirs refused to sign the deeds. It was not until four years later that the white men called "The Proprietors" finally got the drawn marks of several other native people who may not have had authority to sell the land. They "purchased" a 31,000-acre (13,000 ha) tract of land that is now New Fairfield and Sherman, for the equivalent of about 300 dollars, and on April 24, 1729, the deed was recorded on May 9, 1729, and is now deposited in the archives of the state capital in Hartford, Connecticut.

Settlers originally spelled the town as "Newfairfield". It started as a very small farming community, and was not incorporated as a town until 1740. The town of Sherman separated from New Fairfield in 1802, as the size of the combined towns made it difficult to travel to church.

In 1926, Connecticut Light and Power (CL&P) began construction on Candlewood Lake, considered by many to be an engineering wonder. CL&P flooded the valley to control the water flow from the Housatonic and Rocky Rivers and produce hydroelectric power for the region. Candlewood Lake was named for the Native American practice of using stripped wood from pine trees as kindling for fire. The lake shares its shores with the towns of New Fairfield, Sherman, New Milford, Brookfield, and Danbury.

New Fairfield was home to the Candlewood Playhouse, a 650-seat summer stock theater run by the Gateway Playhouse, currently operating in Bellport, New York. The land once occupied by it is now a Stop & Shop supermarket.

== Geography ==
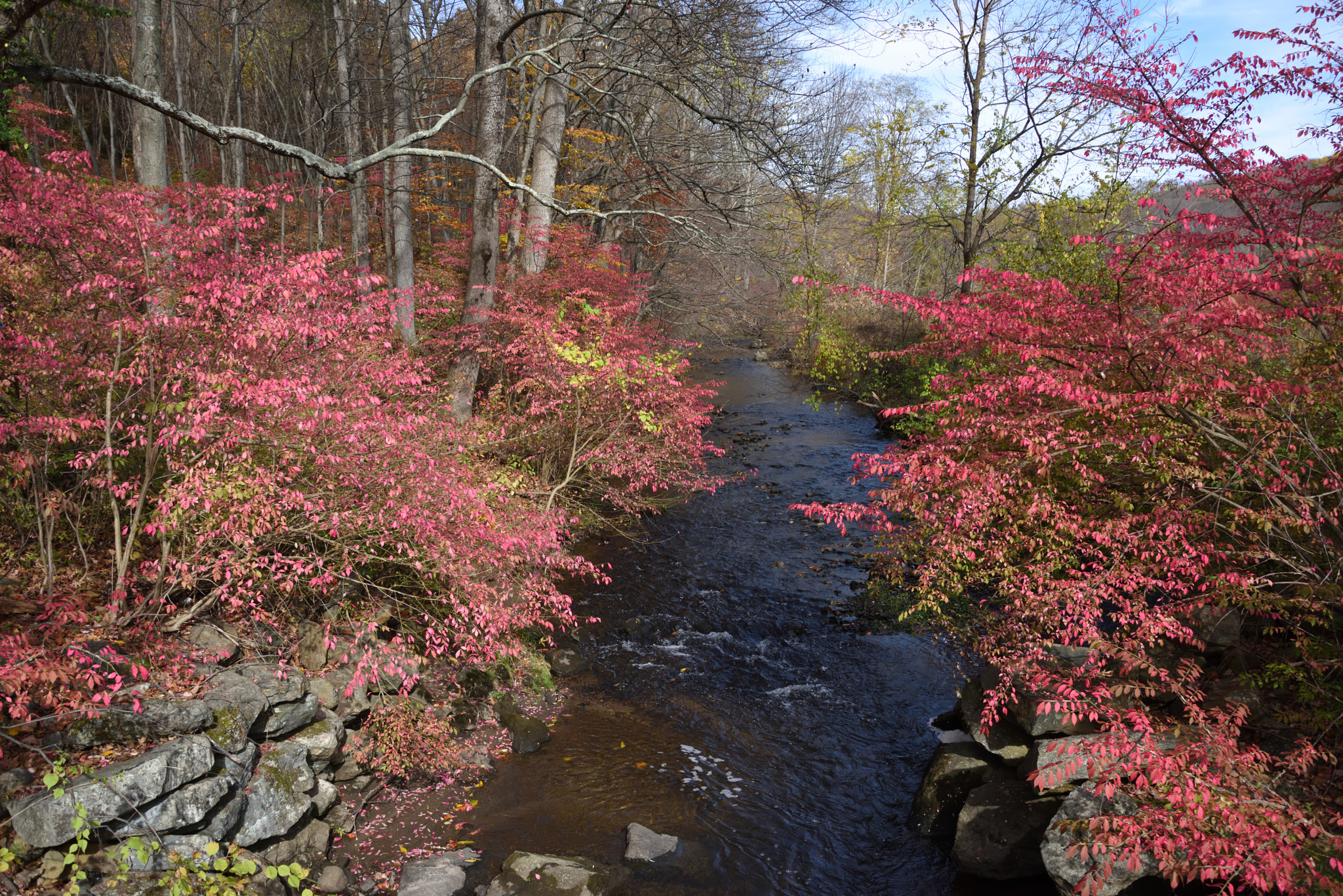
Stream near Pembroke Road (close to the New York state line), taken in November

According to the United States Census Bureau, the town has a total area of 25.1 square miles (65 km^{2}), of which 20.5 square miles (53 km^{2}) is land and 4.6 square miles (12 km^{2}), or 18.32%, is water. New Fairfield borders Danbury to the south, Brookfield to the southeast, New Milford to the northeast, Sherman to the north, and Patterson, New York to the west.

There are four lakes in New Fairfield: Candlewood Lake, Squantz Pond, Ball Pond, and Margerie Lake Reservoir. Candlewood Lake dominates the eastern side of the town and extends both north and south beyond the town borders. Once a summer resort destination, the lake shore within New Fairfield is now mostly populated with many year-round homes.

Pond Mountain is located in the town.

=== Principal communities ===
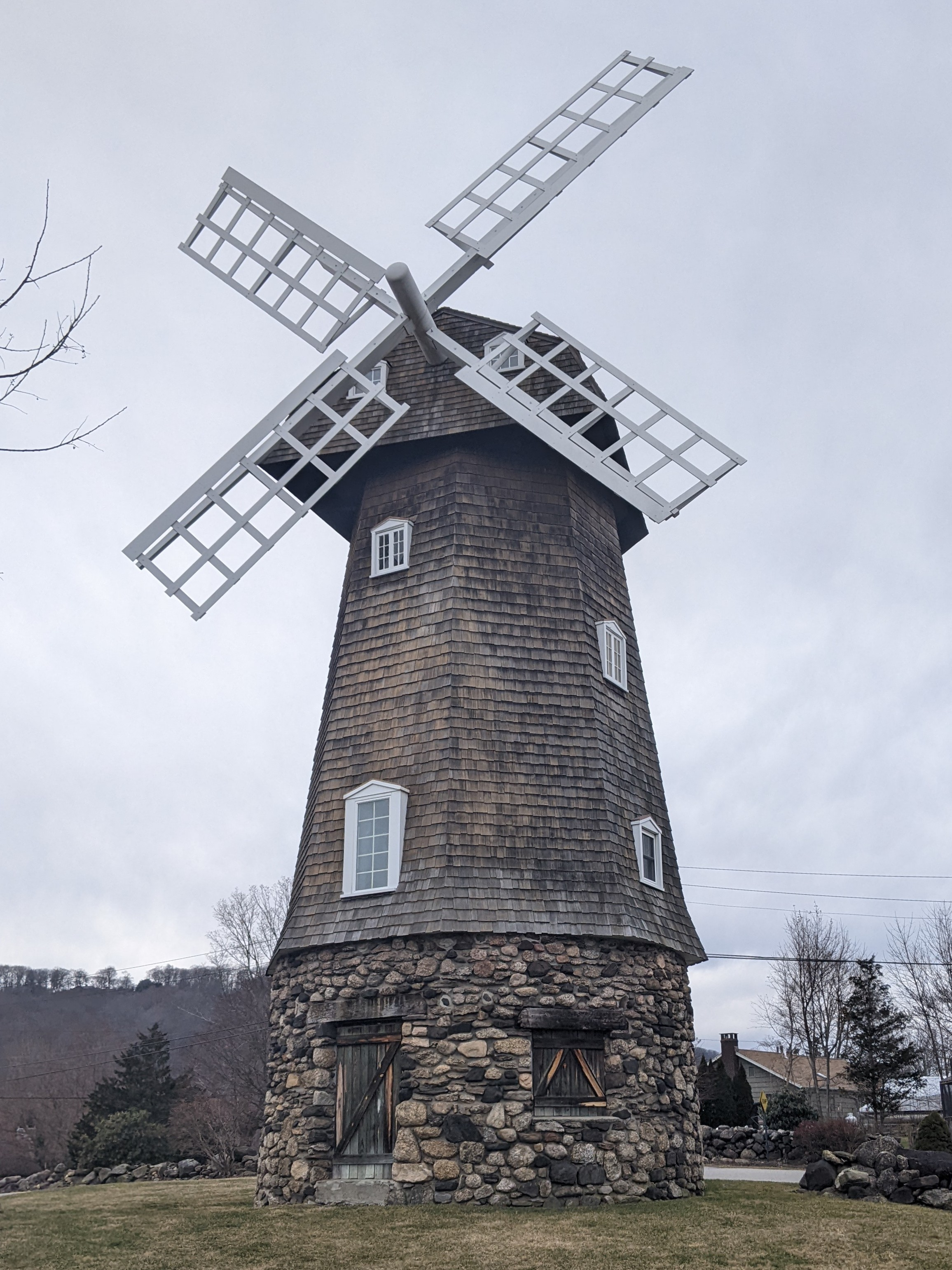
Windmill in the Knollcrest section of town

- Ball Pond
- Candlewood Hills
- Candlewood Isle
- Candlewood Knolls
- Knollcrest
- New Fairfield center

Other minor named locales in the town are Bigelow Corners, Bogus Hill, Candlewood Corner, Charcoal Ridge, Hollywyle Park, Inglenook, Joyce Hill, Kellogg Point, Locust Glen, Possum Ridge, Sail Harbor, and Taylor Corners.

The newer communities with larger houses can be found in Sail Harbor. Many communities have large houses with direct waterfront access to Candlewood Lake, such as Sail Harbor, Candlewood Isle, and Bogus Hill. There have been many new subdivisions such as communities off Warwick Road, Route 39/37, Pine Hill, Beaver Bog, Dick Finn, and Shortwoods Road.

=== ZIP code ===
When ZIP codes were introduced in 1963, the original Danbury code, 06810, also covered the whole of New Fairfield. When Danbury received additional ZIP codes in 1984, a new code, 06812, was introduced for New Fairfield.

== Demographics ==
Historical population
Census	Pop.	Note	%±
1790	1,573		—
1800	1,665		5.8%
1810	772		−53.6%
1820	788		2.1%
1830	939		19.2%
1840	956		1.8%
1850	927		−3.0%
1860	915		−1.3%
1870	870		−4.9%
1880	791		−9.1%
1890	670		−15.3%
1900	584		−12.8%
1910	551		−5.7%
1920	468		−15.1%
1930	434		−7.3%
1940	608		40.1%
1950	1,236		103.3%
1960	3,355		171.4%
1970	6,991		108.4%
1980	11,260		61.1%
1990	12,911		14.7%
2000	13,953		8.1%
2010	13,881		−0.5%
2020	13,579		−2.2%
U.S. Decennial Census

As of the census of 2000, there were 13,953 people, 4,638 households, and 3,905 families residing in the town. The population density was 681.9 inhabitants per square mile (263.3/km^{2}). There were 5,148 housing units at an average density of 251.6 per square mile (97.1/km^{2}). The racial makeup of the town was 96.83% White, 0.39% African American, 0.04% Native American, 1.27% Asian, 0.01% Pacific Islander, 0.52% from other races, and 0.95% from two or more races. Hispanic or Latino of any race were 2.82% of the population.

The 2000 census reported that New Fairfield was the most heavily Irish-American community in Connecticut, with about 32% of the residents claiming Irish ancestry.

There were 4,638 households, out of which 44.5% had children under the age of 18 living with them, 75.3% were married couples living together, 6.5% had a female householder with no husband present, and 15.8% were non-families. 12.6% of all households were made up of individuals, and 5.0% had someone living alone who was 65 years of age or older. The average household size was 3.01 and the average family size was 3.30.

In the town, the population was spread out, with 30.0% under the age of 18, 5.1% from 18 to 24, 30.3% from 25 to 44, 25.9% from 45 to 64, and 8.6% who were 65 years of age or older. The median age was 37 years. For every 100 females, there were 99.6 males. For every 100 females age 18 and over, there were 96.7 males.

The median income for a household in the town was $106,145, and the median income for a family was $132,271. Males had a median income of $65,978 versus $40,284 for females. The per capita income for the town was $34,928. About 1.0% of families and 1.7% of the population were below the poverty line, including 1.5% of those under age 18 and 4.7% of those age 65 or over.

== Arts and culture ==
=== Attractions ===
- Candlewood Lake
- Cosier-Murphy House – added to the National Register of Historic Places on August 31, 1991
- New Fairfield Historical District
- Pootatuck State Forest
- Squantz Pond State Park is partly in the town.
- Williams House – added to the National Register of Historic Places on May 4, 2014

== Government ==
Historically, New Fairfield has been a Republican stronghold in now predominantly Democratic Fairfield County. Lyndon B. Johnson is the most recent Democrat to manage and win the town in his landslide victory in 1964. It is one of only three municipalities in the county to vote for Republican Donald Trump in each of his three elections.

Voter registration and party enrollment as of October 31, 2023
Party	Active voters	Inactive voters	Total voters	Percentage (approx.)
Republican	2,884	411	3,295	30%
Democratic	2,309	377	2,686	24%
Unaffiliated	4,035	799	4,834	44%
Minor parties	201	34	235	2%
Total	9,429	1,621	11,050	100%

Presidential elections results

New Fairfield town vote by party in presidential elections
Year	Democratic	Republican	Third Parties
2024	44.31% 3,653	54.40% 4,485	1.29% 107
2020	47.92% 4,101	50.75% 4,343	1.33% 114
2016	40.00% 3,071	56.04% 4,302	3.96% 304
2012	43.16% 3,323	55.70% 4,288	1.14% 88
2008	44.89% 3,377	54.03% 4,064	1.08% 81
2004	39.68% 2,964	58.92% 4,401	1.39% 104
2000	42.27% 2,866	53.11% 3,601	4.62% 313
1996	39.10% 2,500	48.59% 3,107	12.31% 787
1992	28.40% 2,047	47.52% 3,426	24.08% 1,736
1988	28.53% 1,823	70.07% 4,477	1.39% 89
1984	22.70% 1,362	76.77% 4,606	0.53% 32
1980	26.66% 1,386	61.97% 3,222	11.37% 591
1976	35.60% 1,584	63.43% 2,822	0.97% 43
1972	24.81% 891	74.10% 2,661	1.09% 39
1968	31.52% 858	61.65% 1,678	6.83% 186
1964	55.62% 1,044	44.38% 833	0.00% 0
1960	33.46% 613	66.54% 1,219	0.00% 0
1956	19.22% 240	80.78% 1,009	0.00% 0

== Education ==
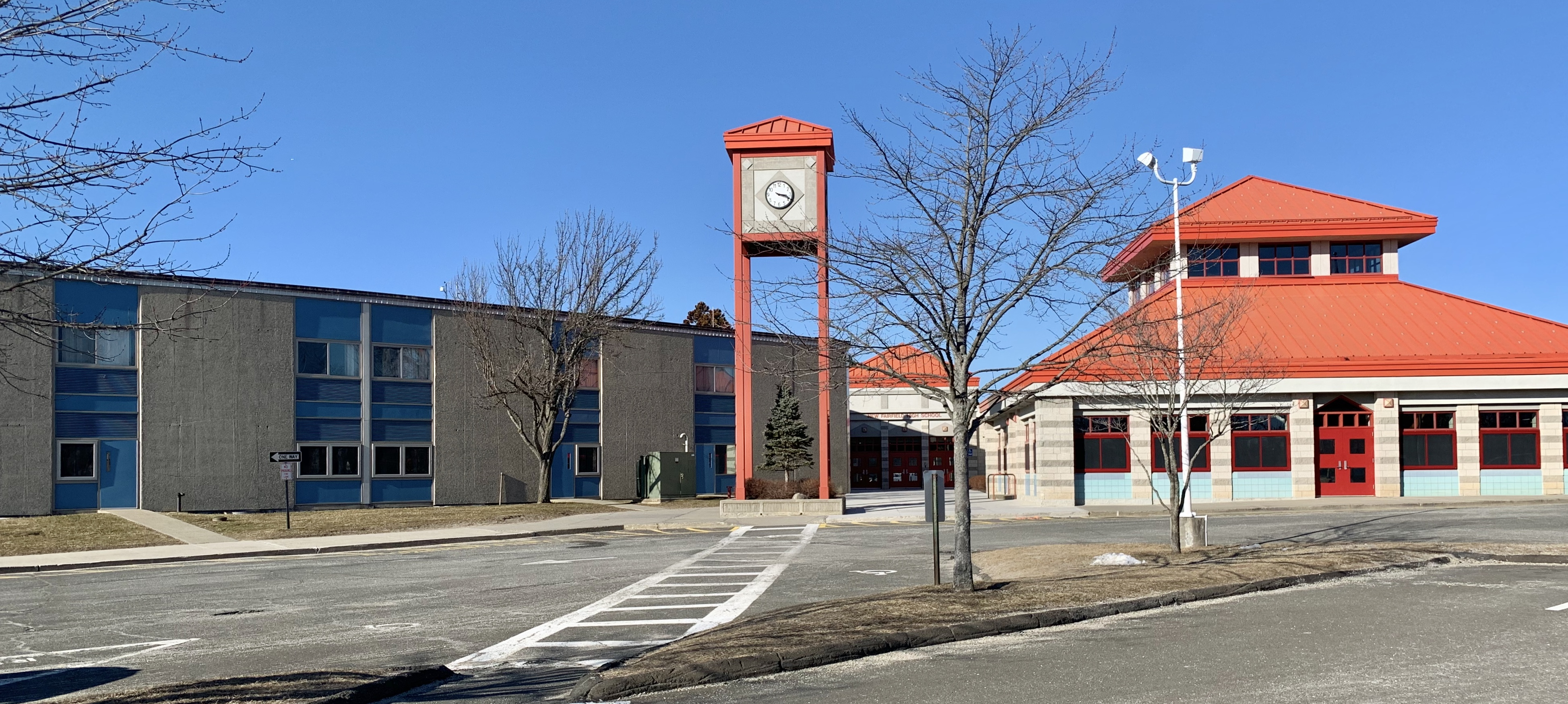
New Fairfield High School

New Fairfield has one high school for grades 9–12, New Fairfield High School. Connected directly to the high school is a middle school for grades 6–8, New Fairfield Middle School. The town has one elementary school for grades 3–5, Meeting House Hill School, as well as a primary school for Kindergarten through grade 2, Consolidated School. There are also two preschool/day care centers, Bright Beginnings and First Step Preschool.

== Transportation ==
Connecticut Route 37 and Connecticut Route 39 are the two primary state roads that connect New Fairfield. Interstate 84 is the closest highway, located in Danbury to the south.

New Fairfield does not have its own train station. The closest stations are Southeast station on the Harlem Line, and Danbury station on the Danbury Branch of the New Haven Line. Housatonic Area Regional Transit (HART) operates a weekday commuter shuttle between Southeast station, and the town's two park and ride lots (located at the Ball Pond Firehouse and the Company A Firehouse).

== Notable people ==
- Margot Austin (1907–1990), author, illustrator
- Rich Bisaccia (born 1960), Las Vegas Raiders Interim Head Coach
- Mary Ann Carson, Connecticut State Representative
- Jake Ceresna (born 1994), professional football player
- Frank Figliuzzi (born 1962), former assistant director of Counter Intelligence at the FBI. Frequent cable news guest
- Ken Jurkowski (born 1981), Olympic rower 2008 & 2012
- Steven Novella (born 1964), neurologist, host of the Skeptics' Guide to the Universe
- Jennifer Rizzotti (born 1974), professional basketball player and coach
- Bernie Williams (born 1968), retired professional baseball player for the New York Yankees
