= Candlewood Lake =

Lake in Western Connecticut, United States

- Candlewood Lake, October 2011

- Location within Connecticut Location within the United States
- Location: Fairfield / Litchfield counties, Connecticut, US
- Coordinates: 41.49°N 73.45°W
- Lake type: Reservoir
- Primary inflows: Rocky River, Housatonic River
- Primary outflows: Rocky River, Housatonic River
- Basin countries: United States
- Max. length: 11 mi (18 km)
- Max. width: 2 mi (3.2 km) widest point
- Surface area: 5,420 acres (21.9 km^{2})
- Average depth: 40 ft (12 m)
- Max. depth: 90 ft (27 m)
- Water volume: 167,112 acre-feet (206,130,000 m^{3})
- Shore length^{1}: 60 mi (97 km)
- Surface elevation: 429 ft (131 m)
- Islands: 12
- Settlements: Brookfield, Danbury, New Fairfield, New Milford, and Sherman
- ^{1} Shore length is not a well-defined measure.

Interactive map of Candlewood Lake

Candlewood Lake is a manmade lake located in Fairfield and Litchfield counties of Western Connecticut, in the northeastern United States. At 8.4 square miles (22 km^{2}), it is the largest lake in Connecticut and the largest lake in the New York metropolitan area. The lake is bordered by the city of Danbury, and the towns of Brookfield, New Fairfield, New Milford, and Sherman. Some of the most expensive real estate in the Greater Danbury area is located along the shores of the lake.

== Creation ==
=== Concept ===
On July 15, 1926, Connecticut Light and Power Company's board of directors approved a plan to create the first large-scale operation of pumped storage facilities in the US. By creating the lake and pumping it full of water from the Housatonic River, then letting the water pour down the penstock and into a turbine, the utility could produce electricity.

Candlewood Lake was formed behind a hydroelectric dam south of the Rocky River's junction with the Housatonic River in New Milford. Similar to a giant battery, its main purpose is to store water during periods of low electrical demand for power generation when demand is high. Excess electricity from the valley's hydro-system is used to pump water up a hillside into the lake from the nearby Housatonic River during spring, and overnight hours in summer. The water is then allowed to flow back down into the river when extra electricity is needed in the grid, often during the region's mid-to-late summer heat waves. Power is generated by turbines that are spun by the water flowing into the river while pumping is done by reversing the impellers.

=== Construction ===
Within a few weeks of the decision to move ahead, 50 surveyors began to scout the valley, and lawyers were hired to process the deeds transferring land held by some families since before the American Revolution into the hands of CL&P. The utility had the power of eminent domain and so some of the farmers sold their land - $2,356 for 53 acres (21 ha), $3,000 for 34 acres (14 ha), $100 for 3 acres (1.2 ha). Some of the families refused to sell so their land was taken and flooded. Inhabitants were relocated, but many of the buildings were left standing and some farming equipment was left behind. The roads were not torn up before the valley was flooded. A small cemetery in the area where the lake was built was relocated.

Starting in late July 1926, nearly 1,400 men labored to create Connecticut's largest body of water. About 500 men from Maine and Canada hand-felled 4,500 acres (1,800 ha) of woodland, burning the lumber in massive bonfires. Several dams were built. The largest, at the north end of the valley, measured 952 feet (290 m) wide and 100 feet (30 m) high upon completion.

On February 25, 1928, the first pumping operation began pouring water into the valley from the Housatonic. Engineers had planned on the Rocky River and its tributaries filling the valley one-fourth of the way, with the generating plant pumping the remaining three-fourths of the water out of the Housatonic. The valley filled quickly; on September 29, 1928, the water reached an elevation of 429 feet (131 m) above sea level, and Candlewood Lake was considered completed.

CL&P owned and operated the lake and hydroelectric power facilities until it was sold for $9 million in June 2006 due to deregulation of the electric power industry by the State in the late 1990s. The lake and generation plant are currently owned by FirstLight Power Resources.

== Recreation ==
Candlewood Lake is a popular tourist destination, and the area is home to many second homes of New York City residents. The lake is used for recreation year-round, although tourists primarily come during the summer months for swimming, fishing, boating, and golfing. Along its approximately 60-mile (97 km) shoreline are tourist resorts and recreational facilities, including golf courses, beaches, and marinas.

There is a 45 miles per hour (72 km/h) daytime speed limit for boats and a 25 miles per hour (40 km/h) nighttime speed limit from 1/2 hour after sunset to 1/2 hour before sunrise. A 6 miles per hour (9.7 km/h) speed limit is in effect within 100 feet (30 m) of shore, dock, moored vessels, and other places that the power company has marked as hazardous. Seaplanes are also permitted to land on the lake.

The lake is around 40 feet (12 m) deep in most places, with some deeper areas that are 80 feet (24 m). Scuba divers can investigate buildings from the era before the lake was created, follow underwater roads, and discover artifacts. Some of the notable underwater finds are Model Ts, plane wreckage from small craft that have hit the lake since then, and covered bridges.

Candlewood Lake is home to Chicken Rock, a large rock from which people jump into the water. There is also a rope swing that allows people to swing out over the water. The rock is 25 ft (7.6 m) high. It projects into the lake from the shore on the Sherman side of the New Fairfield-Sherman border; it is the site of frequent injuries.

Candlewood Lake is home to many private beaches, such as Lynn Deming Park, Millstone Ridge, Candlewood Lake Club, and Sail Harbour Club.

Northern end of Candlewood Lake with Candlewood Mountain in Springtime

== Environmental preservation ==
Logo of the Candlewood Lake Authority

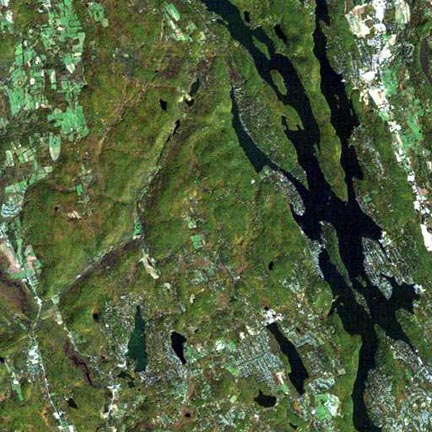
Candlewood Lake from space (NASA photo)

The lake has an ongoing problem with the growth of eelgrass and Eurasian milfoil in shallower areas. Because of the silt kicked up by boats and the problem with water weeds and algae, the visibility in the lake is from 5 to 20 ft (2 to 6 m).

The level of the lake usually is lowered by 10 ft (3 m) over the winter in an attempt to freeze weeds. Attempts have been made to trim them with mechanical cutters on barges; this has had limited success. Various chemical and biological methods have been considered, tested and/or employed to fight the weeds. In December 2006, the Connecticut Department of Environmental Protection, working with members of the U.S. Environmental Protection Agency treated Candlewood Lake for its eelgrass and algae issues with an organic phosphate. Grass-eating weevils were tested in 2008 and 2010, and grass-eating carp were introduced in 2015.

In October 2016, zebra mussels were found on the Rocky River power station for the first time, reinforcing fears that the harmful invasive species will eventually make its way into the lake itself.

== History ==
A small village, Jerusalem, was submerged in the rising waters.

Even before the lake's filling was completed, it became apparent it would draw summer vacationers from as far away as New York City. Land prices on what would become the shoreline had already jumped to $1,000 an acre; summer developments appeared almost immediately.

Although it was almost called Lake Danbury, the new body of water ultimately got its name from New Milford's Candlewood Mountain, which was named after the Candlewood tree (Pinus rigida), whose sapling branches were sometimes used as candles by early settlers.

=== Islands ===
There are 12 islands on Candlewood Lake:

- Green Island
- Deer Island
- Cedar Island
- Oak Island
- Rock Island
- Pine Island
- Sand Island
- Shipwreck Island
- Skeleton Island
- Thistle Island
- Banger Islands
- City Island
- Kakos Island

== See also ==
- Squantz Pond State Park

== Bibliography ==
- Candlewood Lake by Susan Murphy, Gary Smolen, March 2005, 128 pages, "Images of America" series, Arcadia Publishing, paperback ISBN 0-7385-3602-4; ISBN 978-0-7385-3602-6
- Candlewood Lake (fiction) by Penny C. Sansevieri, May 2005, paperback ISBN 0-595-35129-8
