= Western Connecticut Planning Region, Connecticut =

Western Connecticut Council of Governments (WestCOG)
- Planning region
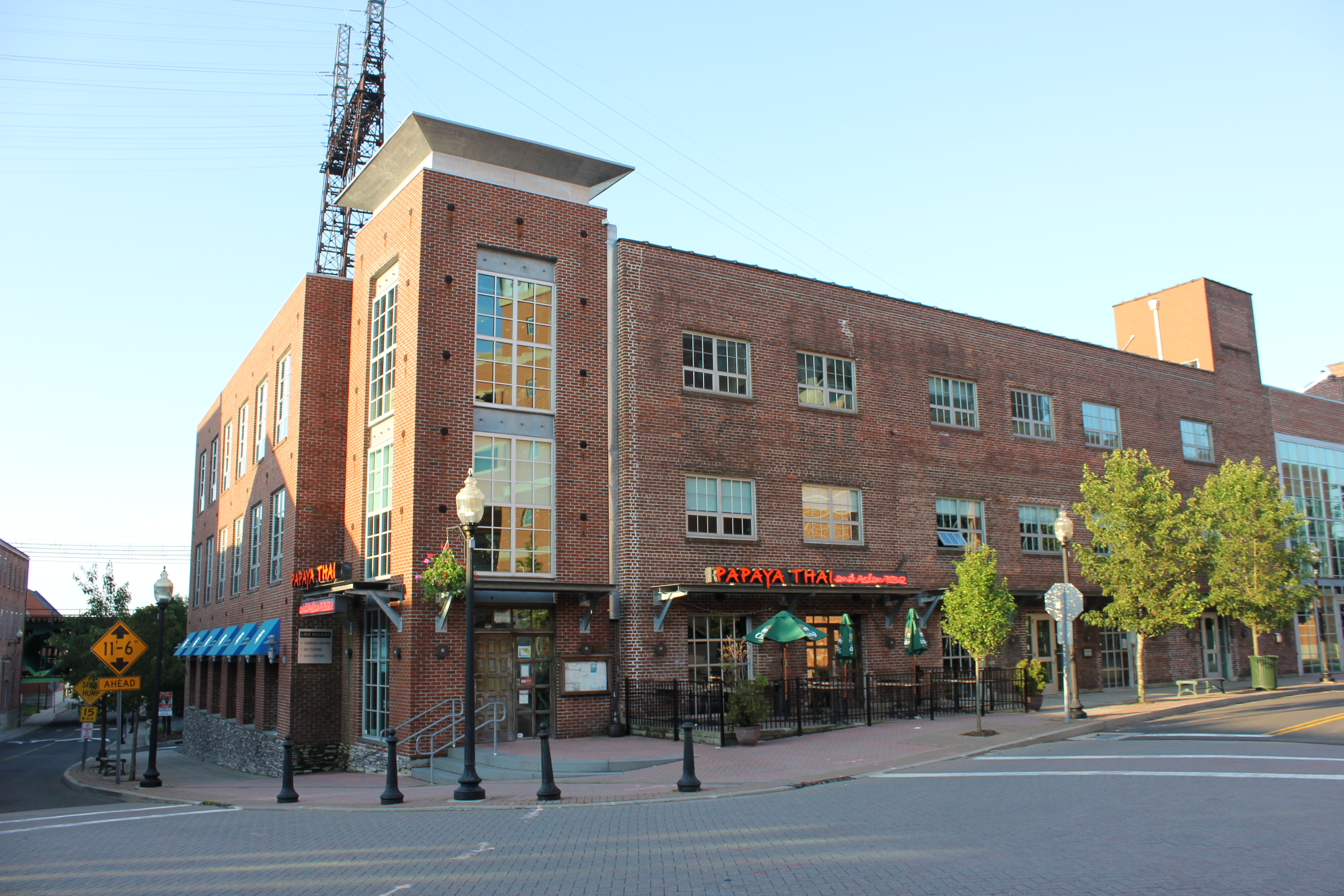
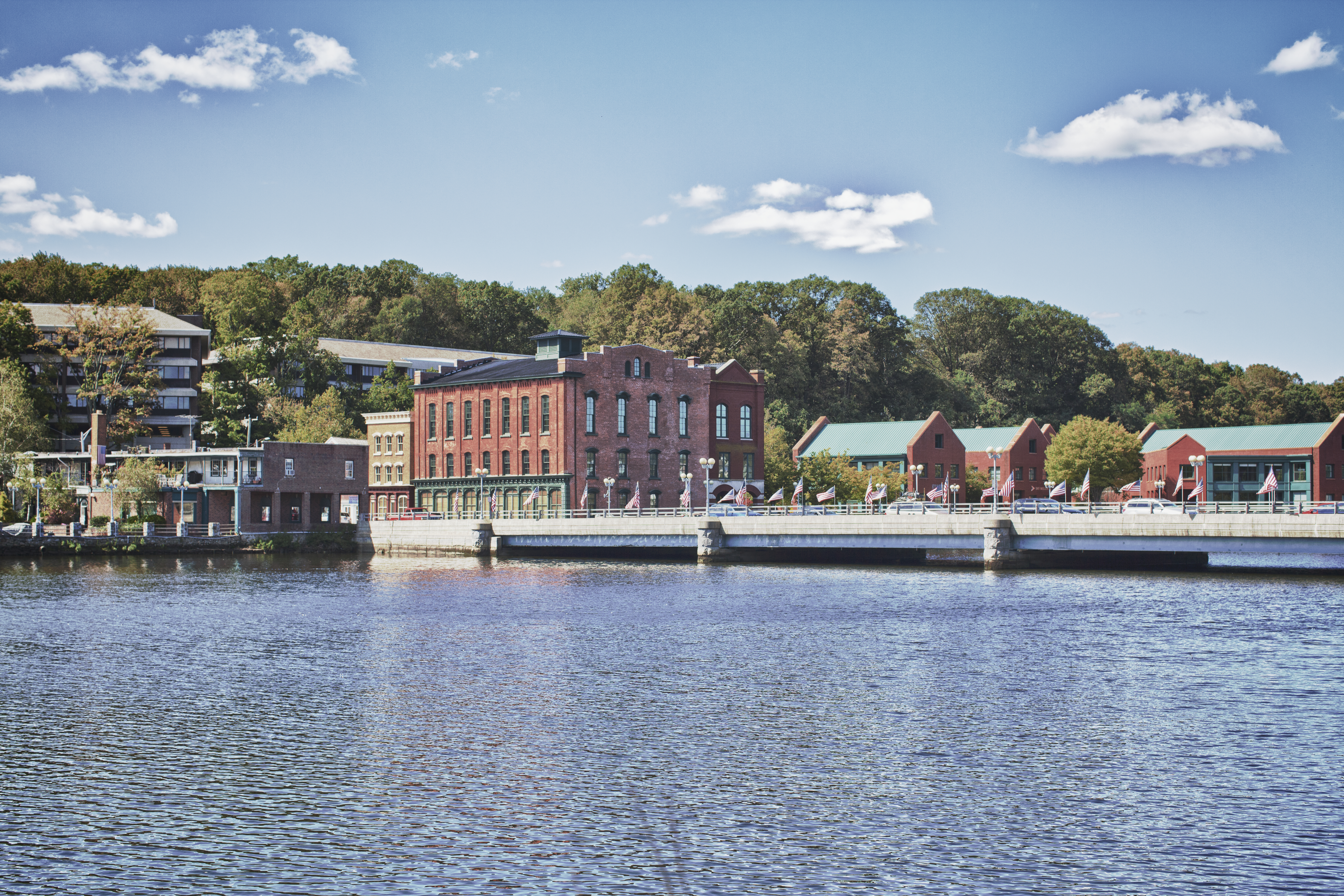
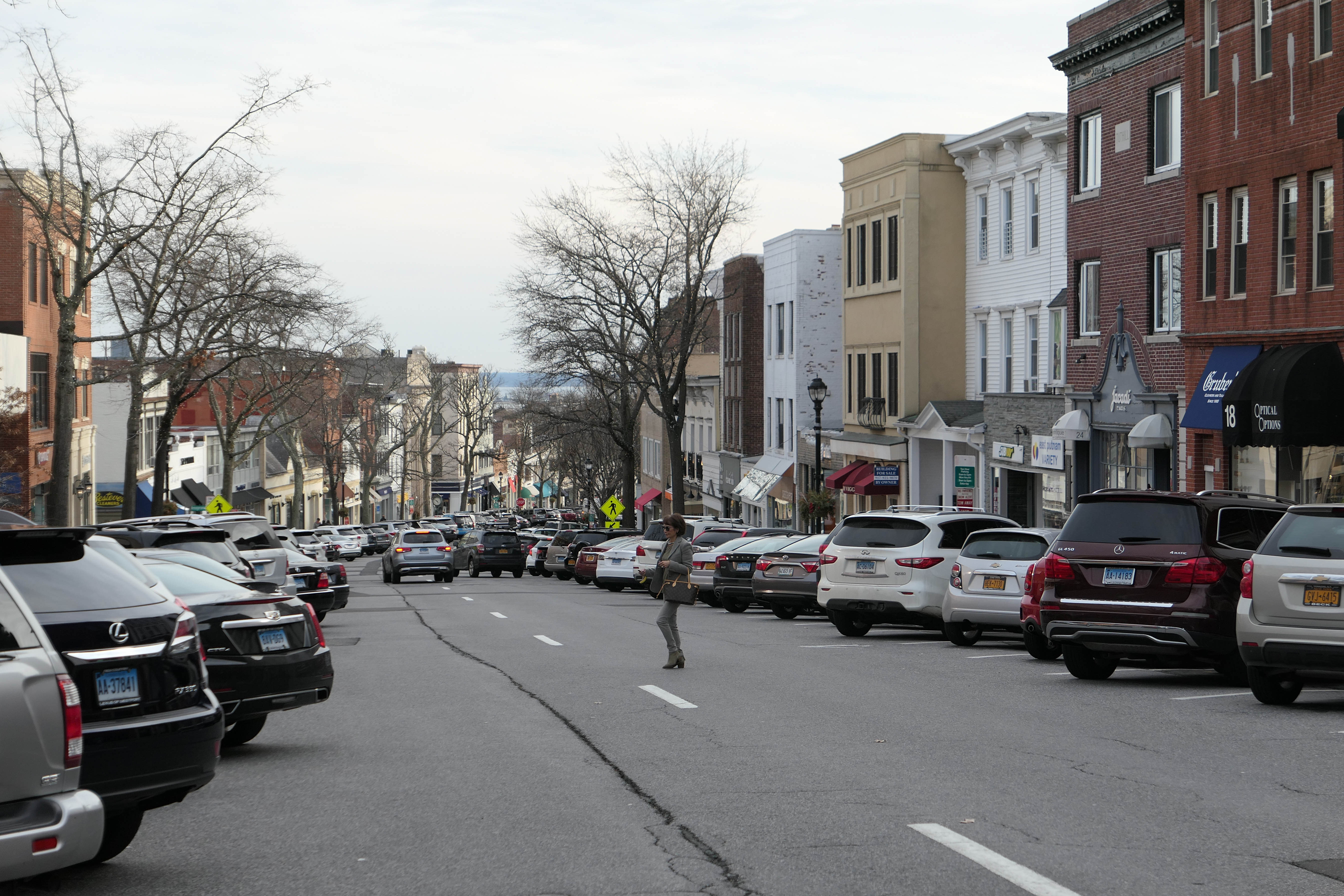
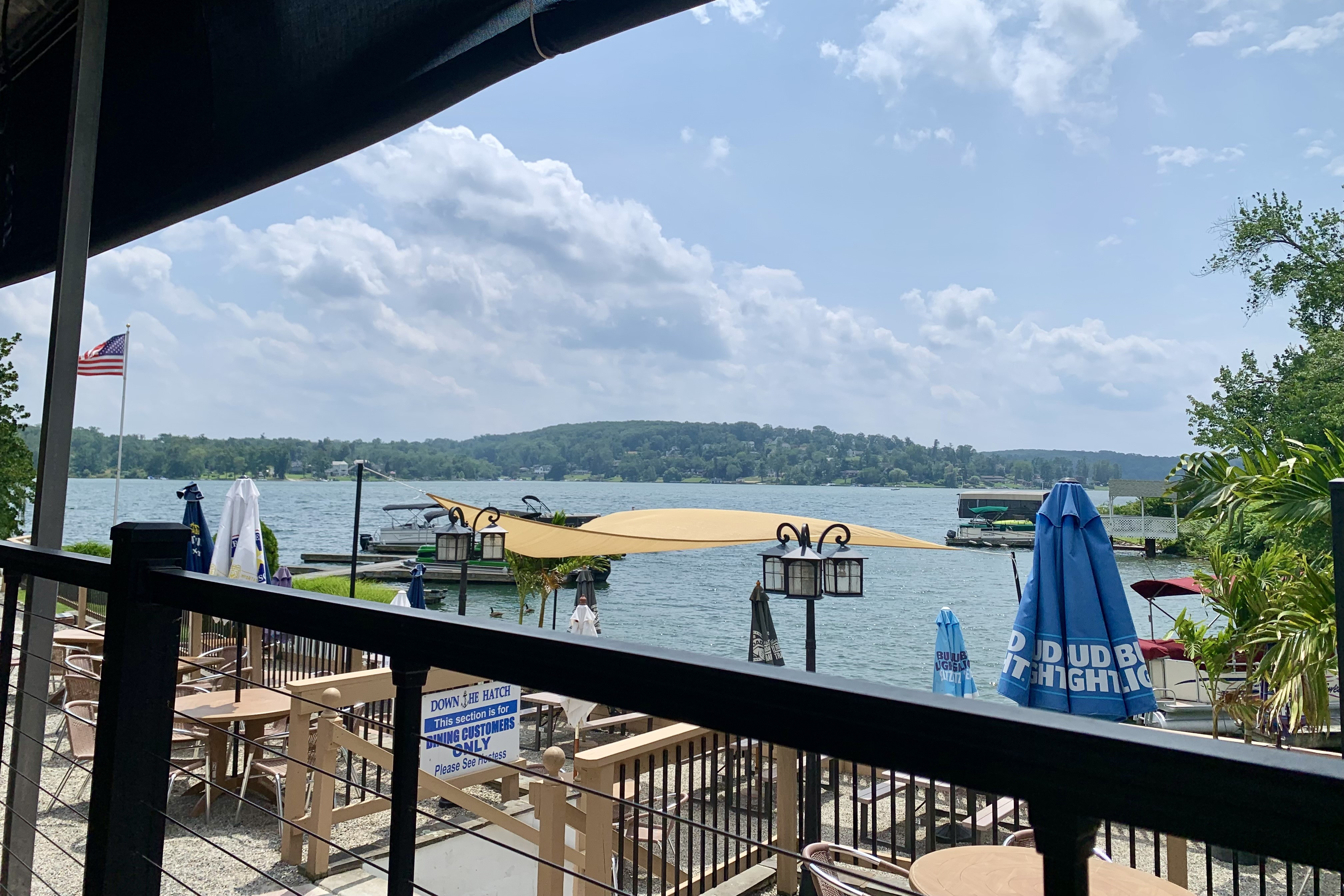
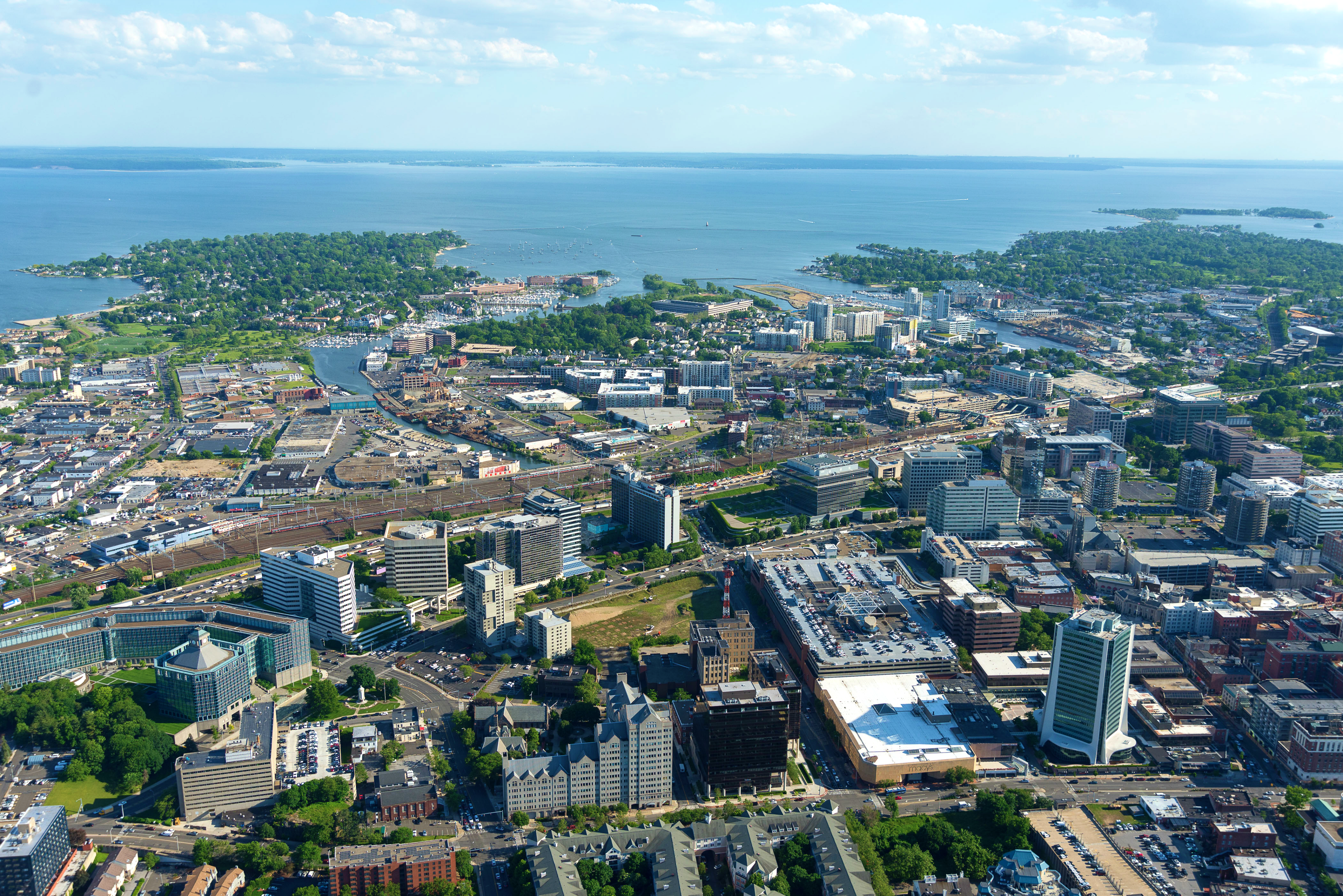
- From top left: South Norwalk, Saugatuck River in Westport, Greenwich Avenue Historic District, Candlewood Lake in Brookfield, Downtown Stamford

- Logo

- Location within the U.S. state of Connecticut
- Coordinates: 41°19′N 73°29′W
- Country: United States
- State: Connecticut
- Founded: 2013
- Largest city: Stamford
- Other cities: Norwalk, Danbury

Government
  - Executive Director: Francis Pickering

Area
  - Total: 532.1 sq mi (1,378 km^{2})

Population (2020)
  - Total: 620,549
  - Estimate (2025): 640,482 ▲
  - Density: 1,166/sq mi (450.3/km^{2})
- Time zone: UTC−5 (Eastern)
  - Summer (DST): UTC−4 (EDT)
- Congressional districts: 4th, 5th
- Website: westcog.org

Interactive map of the Western Connecticut Planning Region

The Western Connecticut Planning Region is a planning region and county-equivalent in the U.S. state of Connecticut. It is served by the coterminous Western Connecticut Council of Governments (WestCOG), one of nine regional councils of governments in Connecticut. Within the region, there are two Metropolitan Planning Organizations (MPOs), South Western CT MPO and the Housatonic Valley MPO.

The region includes the Connecticut Panhandle, Greater Danbury, and the Gold Coast. In 2022, planning regions were approved to replace Connecticut's counties as county-equivalents for statistical purposes, with full implementation occurring in 2024.

WestCOG serves as the state's closest planning region to New York. All towns within the planning region are included within the New York Metropolitan Area, with towns like Greenwich & Stamford being hubs for commuters who work in the city.

== Demographics ==
Historical population
Census	Pop.	Note	%±
1790	28,396		—
1800	25,499		−10.2%
1810	26,251		2.9%
1820	31,668		20.6%
1830	34,302		8.3%
1840	37,000		7.9%
1850	41,500		12.2%
1860	49,219		18.6%
1870	56,137		14.1%
1880	64,629		15.1%
1890	86,515		33.9%
1900	98,510		13.9%
1910	123,093		25.0%
1920	139,600		13.4%
1930	182,298		30.6%
1940	201,112		10.3%
1950	261,762		30.2%
1960	366,484		40.0%
1970	470,397		28.4%
1980	495,928		5.4%
1990	517,802		4.4%
2000	565,804		9.3%
2010	589,155		4.1%
2020	620,549		5.3%
2025 (est.)	640,482	▲	3.2%
U.S. Decennial Census

As of the 2020 United States census, there were 620,549 people living in the Western Connecticut Planning Region, making it the second most populated region in the state behind the Capitol Planning Region.

== Municipalities ==
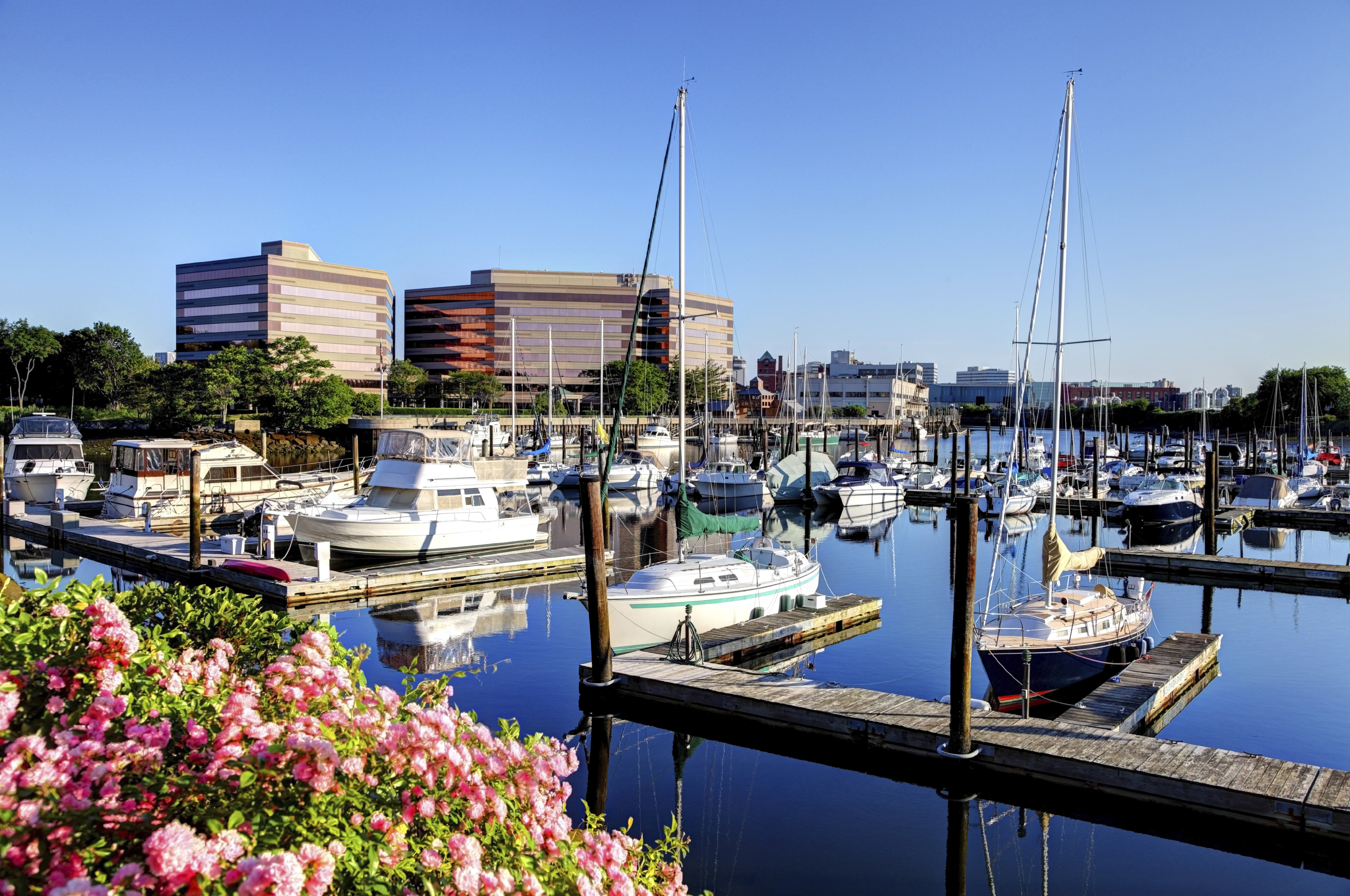
Stamford is the most populous city in the Western Connecticut Region

The following municipalities are members of the Western Connecticut Region:

=== Cities ===
- Danbury
- Norwalk
- Stamford

=== Towns ===
- Bethel
- Bridgewater
- Brookfield
- Darien
- Greenwich
- New Canaan
- New Fairfield
- New Milford
- Newtown
- Redding
- Ridgefield
- Sherman
- Weston
- Westport
- Wilton
