= Fairfield County, Connecticut =

County in Connecticut, United States

- County
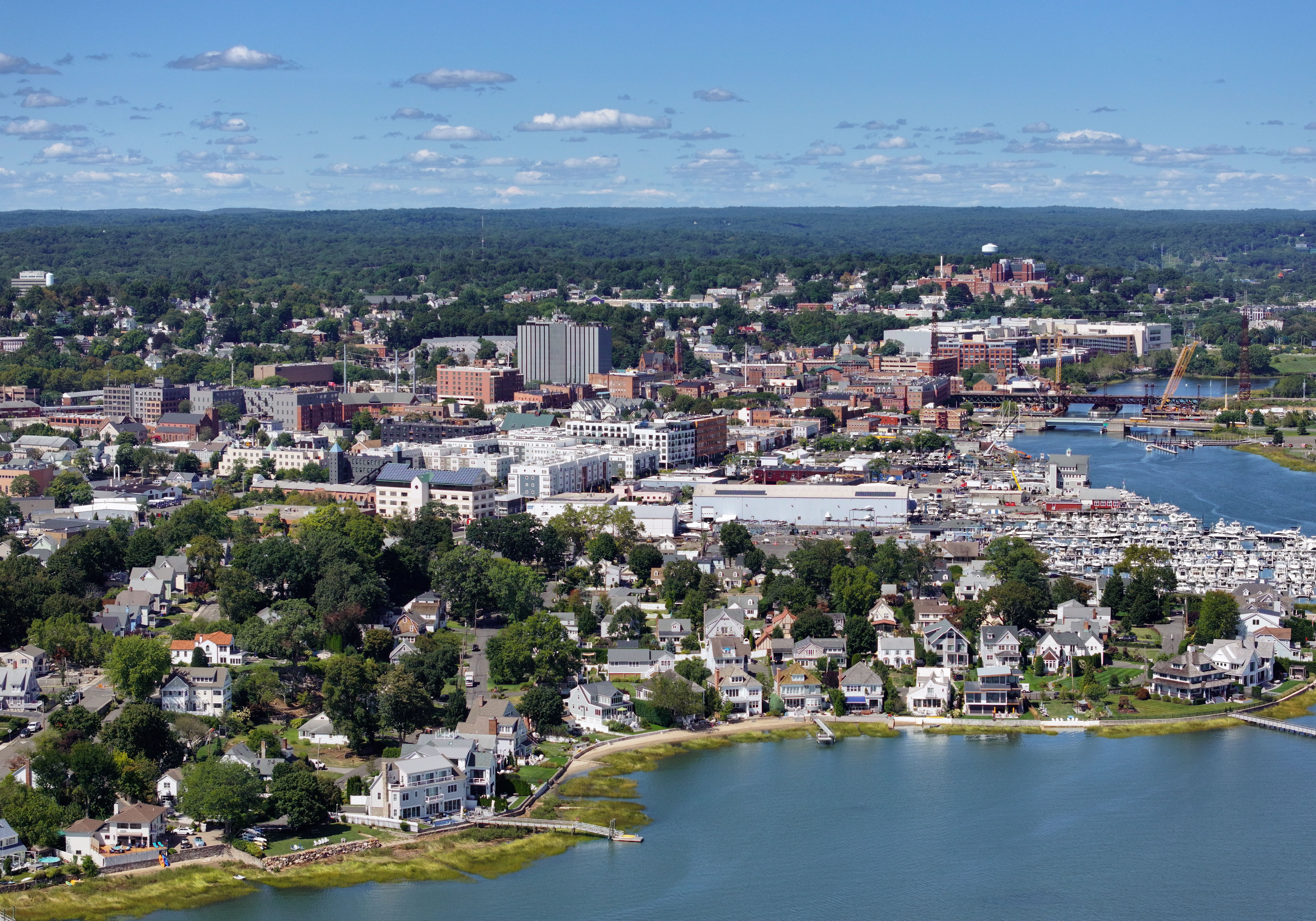
- Bridgeport Stamford Norwalk Danbury

- Location within the U.S. state of Connecticut
- Interactive map of Fairfield County, Connecticut
- Coordinates: 41°14′N 73°22′W
- Country: United States
- State: Connecticut
- Founded: 1666
- Named for: The hundreds of acres of salt marsh that bordered the coast.
- Seat: none; since 1960 Connecticut counties no longer have a county government Fairfield (1666–1853); Bridgeport (1853–1960)
- Largest municipality: Bridgeport (population); Newtown (area)

Area
  - Total: 837 sq mi (2,170 km^{2})
  - Land: 625 sq mi (1,620 km^{2})
  - Water: 212 sq mi (550 km^{2}) 25.3%

Population (2020)
  - Total: 957,419
  - Estimate (2021): 958,768 ▲
  - Density: 1,530/sq mi (591/km^{2})
- Time zone: UTC−5 (Eastern)
  - Summer (DST): UTC−4 (EDT)
- Congressional districts: 3rd, 4th, 5th

Fairfield County is a county in the southwestern corner of the U.S. state of Connecticut. It is the most populous county in the state and was also its fastest-growing from 2010 to 2020. As of the 2020 census, the county's population was 957,419, representing 26.6% of Connecticut's overall population. The closest to the center of the New York metropolitan area, the county contains four of the state's seven largest cities—Bridgeport (first), Stamford (second), Norwalk (sixth) and Danbury (seventh)—whose combined population of 433,368 is nearly half the county's total population.

The United States Office of Management and Budget has designated Fairfield County as the Bridgeport–Stamford–Norwalk metropolitan statistical area. The United States Census Bureau ranked the metropolitan area as the 59th most populous metropolitan statistical area of the United States in 2019. The U.S. Office of Management and Budget has further designated the metropolitan statistical area as a component of the more extensive New York–Newark–Bridgeport, NY–NJ–CT–PA combined statistical area, the most populous combined statistical area and primary statistical area of the United States.

As is the case with all eight of Connecticut's counties, there is no county government and no county seat. As an area, it is only a geographical point of reference. In Connecticut, the cities and towns are responsible for all local governmental activities including fire and rescue, schools, and snow removal; in a few cases, neighboring towns will share certain resources. The last county seat was Bridgeport, which had served this role from 1853 until 1960. On June 6, 2022, the U.S. Census Bureau formally recognized Connecticut's nine councils of governments as county equivalents instead of the state's eight counties. Connecticut's eight historical counties continue to exist in name only, and are no longer considered for statistical purposes.

Fairfield County's Gold Coast helped rank it sixth in the U.S. in per-capita personal income by the Bureau of Economic Analysis in 2005, contributing substantially to Connecticut being one of the most affluent states in the U.S. Other communities are more densely populated and economically diverse than the affluent areas for which the county is better known.

== History ==
Fairfield County was the home of many Native American tribes prior to the Europeans' arrival. People of the Schaghticoke tribe lived in the area of present-day New Fairfield and Sherman. From east to west the Wappinger sachemships included the Paugussetts, Tankiteke, and the Siwanoy. There were also Paquioque and Potatuck inhabitants of Fairfield County.

The Dutch explorer Adriaen Block explored coastal Connecticut in the spring and early summer of 1614 in the North America-built vessel Onrust. The first European settlers of the county, however, were Puritans and Congregationalists from England. Roger Ludlow (1590–1664), one of the founders of the Colony of Connecticut, helped to purchase and charter the towns of Fairfield (1639) and Norwalk (purchased 1640, chartered as a town in 1651). Ludlow is credited as having chosen the name Fairfield. Fairfield is a descriptive name referring to the beauty of its fields. The town of Stratford was settled in 1639 as well by Adam Blakeman (1596–1665). William Beardsley (1605–1661) was also one of the first settlers of Stratford in 1639.

Fairfield County was established by an act of the Connecticut General Court in Hartford along with Hartford County, New Haven County, and New London County; which were the first four Connecticut counties, on May 10, 1666. From transcriptions of the Connecticut Colonial Records for that day:

This Court orders that from the east bounds of Stratford
to y^{e} bounds of Rye shalbe for future one County w^{ch}
shalbe called the County of Fairfield. And it is ordered
that the County Court shalbe held at Fairfield on the second
Tuesday in March and the first Tuesday of November
yearely. [sic]

The original Fairfield County consisted of the towns of Rye, Greenwich, Stamford, Norwalk, Fairfield, and Stratford. In 1673, the town of Woodbury was incorporated and added to Fairfield County. In 1683, New York and Connecticut reached a final agreement regarding their common border. This resulted in the cession of the town of Rye and all claims to the Oblong to New York. From the late 17th century to the early 18th century, several new towns were incorporated in western Connecticut and added to Fairfield County, namely Danbury (1687), Ridgefield (1709), Newtown (1711), and New Fairfield (1740). In 1751, Litchfield County was constituted, taking over the town of Woodbury. The final boundary adjustment to Fairfield County occurred in 1788 when the town of Brookfield was incorporated from parts of Newtown, Danbury, and New Milford, with Fairfield County gaining territory from Litchfield County.

Other early county inhabitants include:

- Joseph Hawley (born 1603 in England; died 1690), who had emigrated to America in 1629 and then settled in Stratford in 1650, later becoming Stratford's first town clerk. Joseph Hawley's son Ephraim built the Ephraim Hawley House in 1683 in Trumbull that is still standing and serves as a private residence.
- Thomas Fitch (c. 1700–1774), from Norwalk, was a governor of the Colony of Connecticut.
- Gold Selleck Silliman (1732–1790) of the town of Fairfield fought for the Americans during the American Revolutionary War and rose to the rank of brigadier general by 1776. He fought in the New York campaign that year.

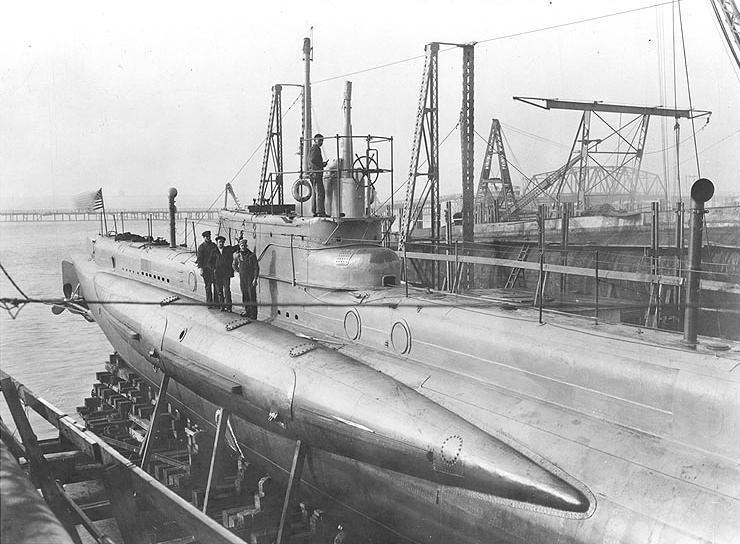
Preparing to re-launch the USS G-3 with sponsons from the Lake Torpedo Boat Company in Bridgeport, December 9, 1915

During the Revolutionary War, Connecticut's prodigious agricultural output led to it being known informally as "the Provisions State". In the spring of 1777, the British Commander-in-Chief, North America General William Howe, in New York City, ordered William Tryon to interrupt the flow of supplies from Connecticut that were reaching the Continental Army. Tryon and Henry Duncan led a fleet of 26 ships carrying 2,000 men to Westport's Compo Beach to raid Continental Army supply depots in Danbury on April 22, 1777. American Major General David Wooster (1710–1777), who was born in Stratford, was in charge of the stores at Danbury and defended them with a force of only 700 troops. Two years later during a British raid on Greenwich on February 26, 1779 General Israel Putnam, who had stayed at Knapp's Tavern the previous night, rode away on his horse to warn the people of Stamford. Putnam was shot at by the British raiders but was able to escape. The hat he was wearing with a musket ball hole in it is on display at Knapp's Tavern in Greenwich (which is commonly, albeit somewhat erroneously, called Putnam's cottage). In the summer of 1779, General William Tryon sought to punish Americans by attacking civilian targets in coastal Connecticut with a force of about 2,600 British troops. New Haven was raided on July 5, Fairfield was raided on the 7th and burned. Norwalk was raided on July 10 and burned on the 11th. Norwalk militia leader Captain Stephen Betts put up resistance to the invaders, but was overwhelmed by the powerful British raiders and was forced to retreat.

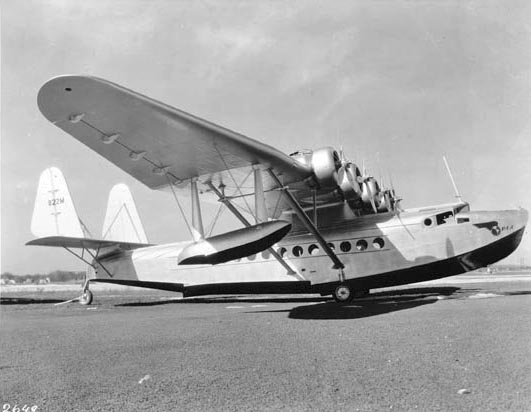
A 1930s Sikorsky S-42 constructed in Stratford

David Sherman Boardman (1786–1864) was a prominent early lawyer and judge in this and neighboring Litchfield County.

On October 7, 1801, Neheemiah Dodge and other members of the Danbury Baptist Association wrote a letter to then-president Thomas Jefferson expressing their concern that, as Baptists, they may not be able to express full religious liberty in the state of Connecticut whose "ancient charter" was adopted before the establishment of a Baptist church in the state. Jefferson replied in a letter to Dodge and the other members of the Danbury church on January 1, 1802, in which he stated that the First Amendment to the United States Constitution provided "a wall of separation between church and State" that protected them.

An agricultural region, the first railroad was the Housatonic Railroad, construction started 1836 and ended 1840, extending from Bridgeport to New Milford originally, connecting Litchfield County crops to the port in Bridgeport, bypassing New York City. The New York and New Haven railroad along the county's coast was constructed in the late 1840s, which started in New York City and ended in New Haven, connecting Bridgeport, Stamford, Norwalk and all the towns on the coast.

In 1851, the county seat of Fairfield County was moved from the town of Fairfield to the newly founded neighboring city of Bridgeport. This was due to its growing population and industry as the old courthouse erected 1794 was no longer adequate. The first hospital in the county, and the 3rd hospital in Connecticut behind Hartford and New Haven Hospitals, Bridgeport Hospital was founded in 1884 along with Fairfield County's first nursing school. It would be soon followed by Danbury Hospital (1885), Norwalk Hospital (1893), Stamford Hospital (1896) Greenwich Hospital (1903),St. Vincent's Hospital in Bridgeport (1903), and Park City Hospital in Bridgeport (1926), which closed in 1993.

By 1900, the largest cities in the county were Bridgeport, Norwalk, Danbury, Stamford and Greenwich. By 1905, Bridgeport had become the principal manufacturing center in the state, and one of the major manufacturers in the New England region behind Boston, Providence, and Worcester, with $44,586,519 total worth of products manufactured without adjusting to today's money. Stamford and Greenwich had become popular resort towns for New York City's wealthy.

In 1905, Connecticut ranked 11th in the United States in terms of industrial goods produced, and Fairfield County contained the city with the most total worth of products made, Bridgeport. One-fifth of Connecticut's population was employed in manufacturing, the state's largest industry which generated most of its wealth. Bridgeport in 1905 produced 20% of America's corsets. The 2nd largest city in Connecticut behind New Haven by 1910, Bridgeport's population grew by 50,000 people during the first 20 months of US involvement during the First World War, producing 50% of Allied ammunition during that time. Bridgeport by 1920 had a population of 143,555 people, then the 44th largest US city. Danbury, in northern Fairfield County, was known as the "Hat City", producing 20% of America's hats, until the industry began to decline in the 1920s. Stamford (population 40,067 in 1920) was known as the "Lock City", as the home of the Yale and Towne Lock Manufacturing Company. Bridgeport, nicknamed "Park City" had in 1930 over 500 factories within its borders. Bridgeport Machines, Inc., a milling machine manufacturer, was founded in Bridgeport in 1938, while Hubbell Incorporated was founded in the 1890s. These are two examples of various companies headquartered in Bridgeport, such as Warnerco, ACME Shear, Westinghouse subsidiary Bryant Electric among others, and others such as Remington Arms, General Electric, Singer Sewing Machines, Sikorsky Aircraft, Carpenter Steel, and countless others, had large scale manufacturing complexes there.

Most of the county remained agricultural. Westport in the 1920s was a bohemian summer artist colony, and was home to famous artists, writers, and painters, such as F. Scott Fitzgerald, who spent a summer in town. The Cos Cob art colony flourished from the late 1800s to the 1920s.

At the height of its influence in the 1920s, the Ku Klux Klan had a distinct presence in the county and county politics. The group was most active in Darien, but had small chapters in Norwalk, Stamford, and Bridgeport. The Klan has since disappeared from the county.

The county's first institution of higher learning was Western Connecticut State University, founded in Danbury in 1903 (known by its acronym, WCSU), followed by the University of Bridgeport in 1927, Fairfield University in neighboring Fairfield in 1947 and Sacred Heart University. It was the subject of a Nina Leen photo-essay cover story in the 8 August 1949 issue of LIFE.

Nearly one-third of Fairfield County's population lived within Bridgeport's city limits in 1950, 31.5%. The city began to decline in population as families moved into nearby suburbs, such as Fairfield, leading to widespread residential development. Bridgeport slowly began to lose jobs and large corporations moved into southern states or outside the country. The city developed a reputation for its aging industrial landscape, which New York Times articles described as a view dominated by smokestacks and aging buildings along the highway. The Connecticut Turnpike (Interstate 95) was built in the mid-1950s along the coast, joining the scenic Merritt Parkway, built in the late 1930s to alleviate traffic on the Post Road, and built further inland away from population centers. Towns such as Westport, Darien, New Canaan, Stamford, and Greenwich became New York City suburbs, forming the Connecticut Gold Coast,

Fairfield County, along with all other Connecticut counties, was abolished as a governmental agency in accord with state legislation that took effect October 1, 1960. The first enclosed shopping malls in Fairfield County were Trumbull Shopping Park (1963), in the bedroom community of Trumbull just outside Bridgeport, the now gone Lafayette Shopping Park (1965) in Bridgeport, replaced downtown blocks that were demolished as part of the city's urban renewal, Danbury Fair Mall (1986) on the former fairgrounds of the annual Danbury Fair, Hawley Lane Mall in Trumbull (1971) and the Stamford Town Center (1982) as part of the urban renewal project in downtown Stamford.

Stamford is an example of edge city urbanization. In the 1960s, Stamford was a residential suburb of New York City, with a few industries and research laboratories. However, much of Stamford's downtown was subsequently razed and rebuilt with modern skyscrapers, and several major corporations moved their headquarters to Stamford, creating one of the largest corporate concentrations in the United States. Originally a more moderate plan, entire downtown blocks and streets were demolished in slow phases and replaced with office towers, residential towers and the Stamford Town Center shopping mall courtesy of the F.D. Rich Company, which was hired by the city to redevelop what was described as the aging, deteriorating downtown, throughout the 60s, 70s and early 80s. Stamford's population grew from 92,713 in 1960 to 135,470 people in 2020, making it the 2nd largest city in Connecticut in 2022 (behind Bridgeport), surpassing New Haven.

== Geography ==
=== Land ===
Candlewood Lake in the northern part of the county in the Appalachian Mountains, near the Taconics and Berkshires

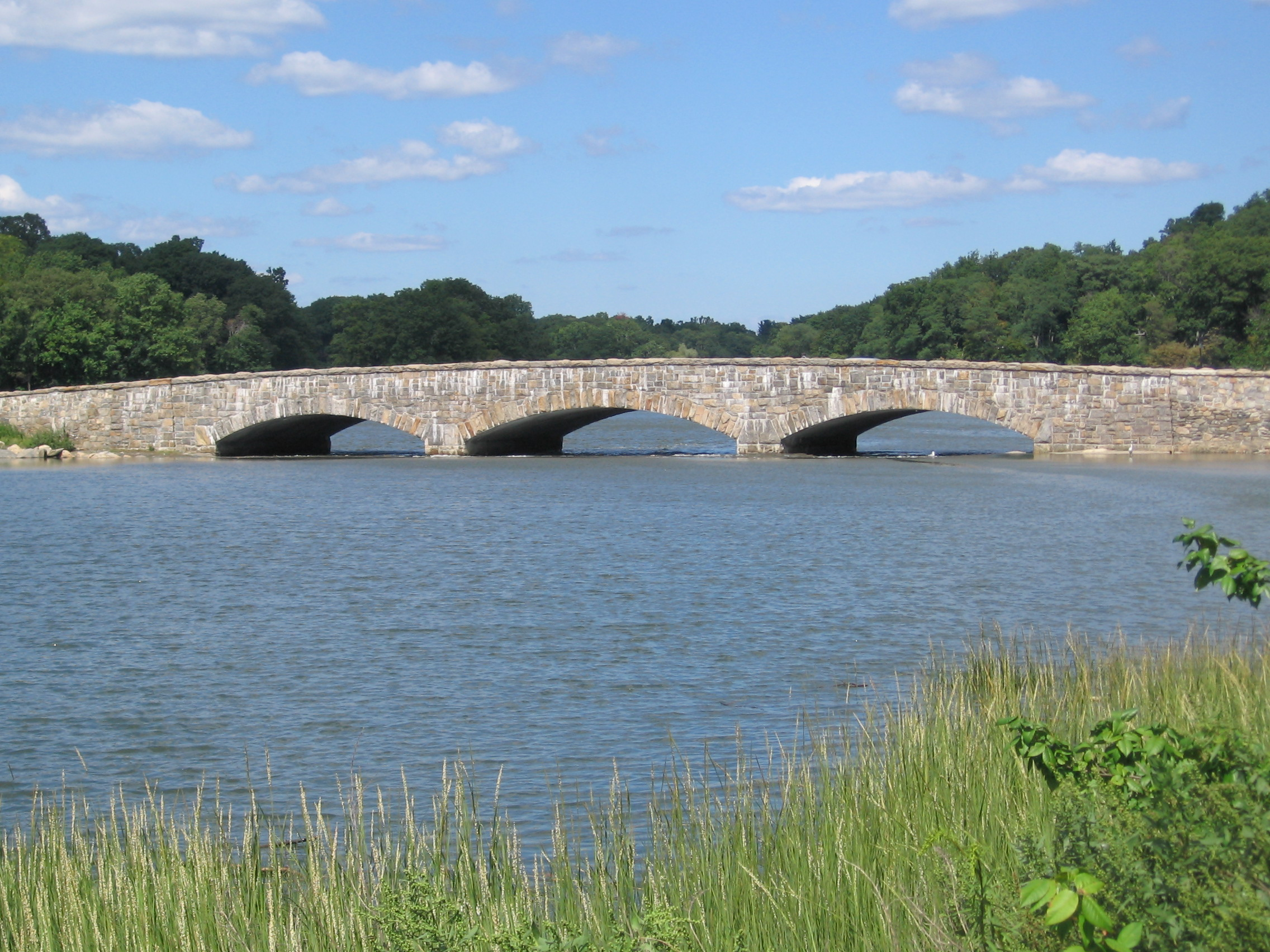
Rings End Bridge, in Darien

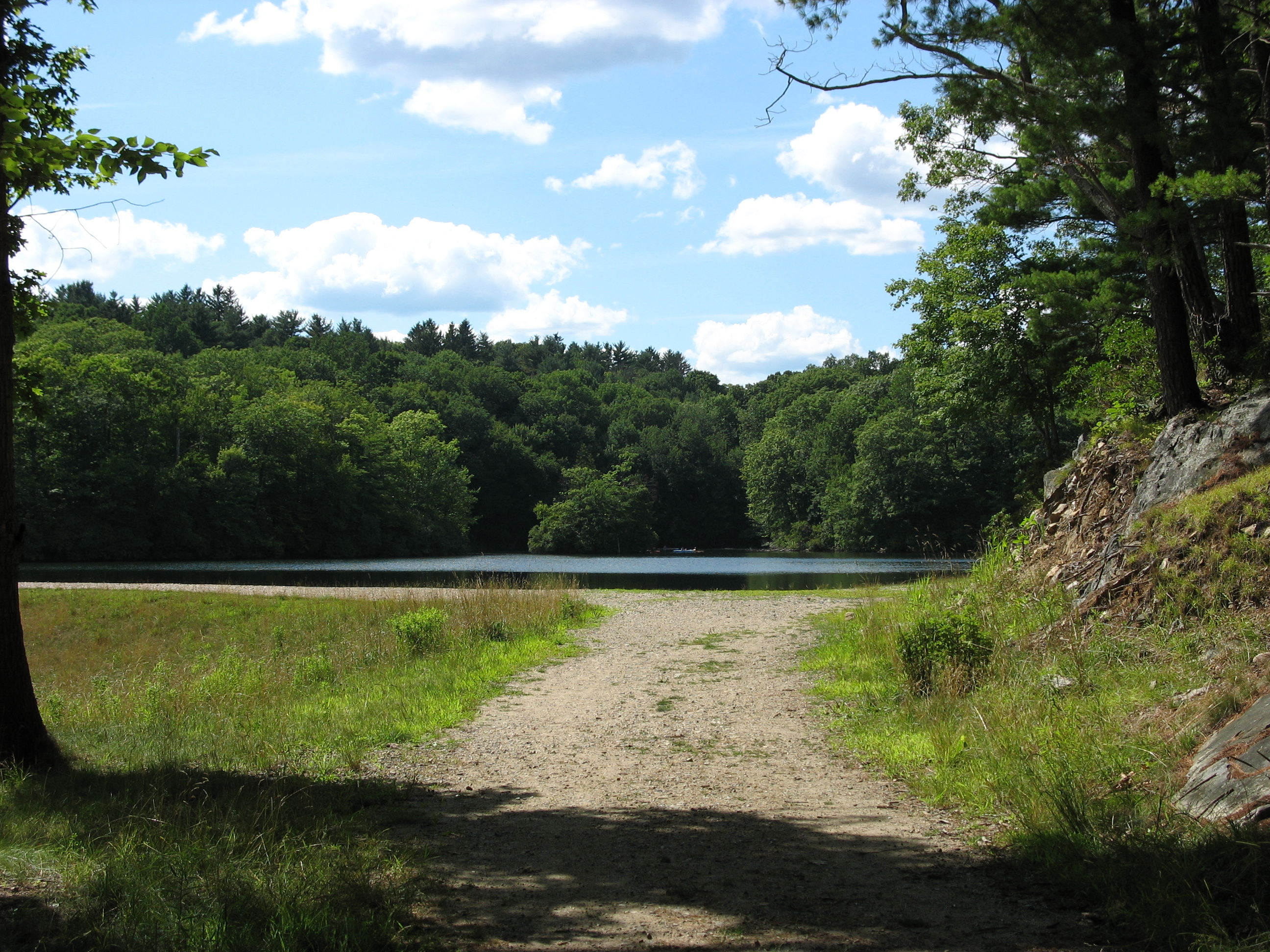
Huntington State Park

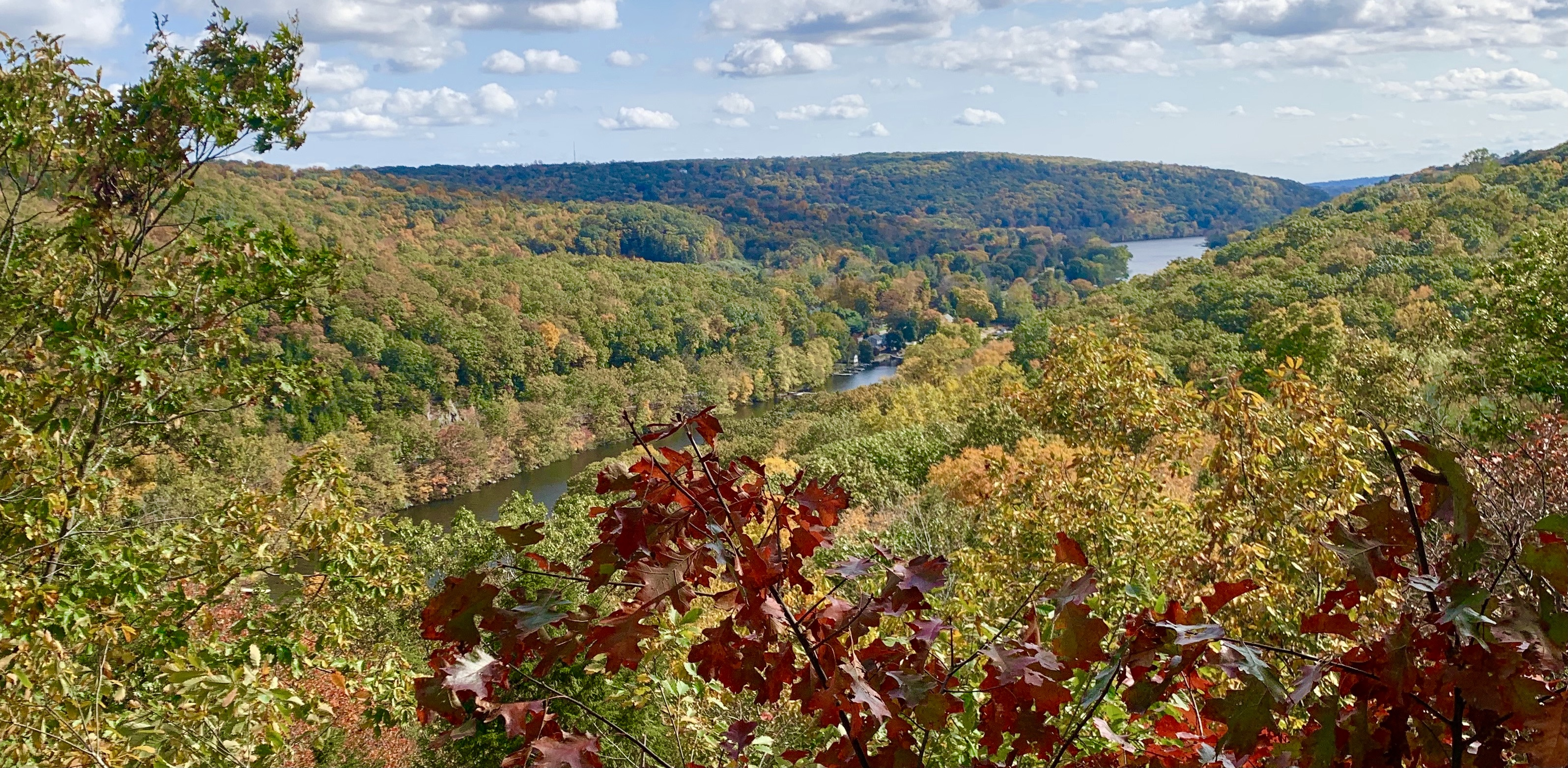
View from the top of Webb Mountain in Monroe

According to the United States Census Bureau, the county has a total area of 837 square miles (2,170 km^{2}), of which 625 square miles (1,620 km^{2}) is land and 212 square miles (550 km^{2}) (25.3%) is water.

The terrain of the county trends from flat near the coast to hilly and higher near its northern extremity. The highest elevation is 1,290 feet (390 m) above sea level along the New York state line south of Branch Hill in the Town of Sherman; the lowest point is sea level itself.

The Taconic Mountains and the Berkshire Mountains ranges of the Appalachian Mountains run through Fairfield County. The Taconics begin roughly in Ridgefield and the Berkshires begin roughly in Northern Trumbull, both running north to Litchfield County and beyond. A portion of the Taconics also is in rural Greenwich and rural North Stamford in Fairfield County and run north into Westchester County, New York, eventually re-entering Fairfield County in Ridgefield. A small portion of the Appalachian Trail runs through Fairfield County; the trail enters Connecticut in the northernmost and least populous town in the county, Sherman, and moves east into Litchfield County, which encompasses the majority of the Appalachian Trail in Connecticut.

The section of the Taconic Mountains range that runs through Greenwich and North Stamford of Fairfield County is also the part of the Appalachians that is closest to the coast out of the entire Appalachian Mountains.

=== Water ===
The agreed 1684 territorial limits of the county are defined as 20 miles (32 km) east of New York's Hudson River, which extends into Long Island Sound with a southerly limit of halfway to Long Island, New York. The eastern limit is mostly a natural border defined as the halfway point of the Housatonic River with New Haven County with the exception of several islands belonging wholly to Stratford. The depth of the Sound varies between 60 and 120 feet (18 and 37 m).

The county hosts or contains the rivers Byram, Housatonic, Mianus, Mill, Norwalk, Pequonnock, Rippowam, Saugatuck, and Still.

==== Pollution ====
The Still River is polluted with mercury nitrate from the hat industry in Danbury, also thereafter diluting into the Housatonic River and Long Island Sound.

The Housatonic is residually polluted with Monsanto chemicals called Aroclor, polychlorinated biphenyls, or PCBs. From c. 1932 until 1977, the river received PCB pollution discharges from the General Electric plant at Pittsfield, Massachusetts.

=== Mountains and summits ===
Refer to List of Mountains and Summits in Fairfield County, Connecticut.

=== Adjacent counties ===
- Litchfield County (north)
- New Haven County (east)
- Westchester County, New York (southwest)
- Putnam County, New York (west)
- Dutchess County, New York (northwest)
- Nassau County, New York (south)

=== National protected areas ===
- Stewart B. McKinney National Wildlife Refuge (part)
- Weir Farm National Historic Site

=== Major highways ===
- I-84
- I-95 / Conn. Turnpike
- I-684
- US 1
- US 6
- US 7
- US 202
- Route 8
- Route 15
- Route 25
- Route 34
- Route 37
- Route 110
- Route 111
- NY 120A
- Route 123

=== Climate ===
Fairfield County has a hot-summer humid continental climate (Dfa) which borders a humid subtropical climate (Cfa) along Long Island Sound. The hardiness zone is 6b in the north and 7a within ten miles of the coast except for areas of Greenwich and Stamford along the coast which are 7b. Snowfall is most prevalent in February with 27 cm or 11 in. Rainfall mildly changes thought the calendar year, it stays between 80 and 110 mm or 3.1 and 4.3 in. Humidity also mildly changes, however, it is at its highest in the summer months.

Climate data for Bridgeport, Connecticut (Sikorsky Airport), 1991–2020 normals, extremes 1948–present
Month	Jan	Feb	Mar	Apr	May	Jun	Jul	Aug	Sep	Oct	Nov	Dec	Year
Record high °F (°C)	69 (21)	68 (20)	84 (29)	91 (33)	97 (36)	97 (36)	103 (39)	100 (38)	99 (37)	89 (32)	79 (26)	76 (24)	103 (39)
Mean maximum °F (°C)	56.7 (13.7)	55.3 (12.9)	64.8 (18.2)	76.4 (24.7)	85.1 (29.5)	90.7 (32.6)	93.8 (34.3)	91.5 (33.1)	86.2 (30.1)	78.1 (25.6)	67.9 (19.9)	59.7 (15.4)	95.4 (35.2)
Mean daily maximum °F (°C)	38.4 (3.6)	40.5 (4.7)	47.4 (8.6)	58.3 (14.6)	68.4 (20.2)	77.7 (25.4)	83.4 (28.6)	81.9 (27.7)	75.4 (24.1)	64.4 (18.0)	53.6 (12.0)	43.8 (6.6)	61.1 (16.2)
Daily mean °F (°C)	31.4 (−0.3)	33.1 (0.6)	39.3 (4.1)	50.0 (10.0)	60.0 (15.6)	69.6 (20.9)	75.7 (24.3)	74.5 (23.6)	67.6 (19.8)	56.4 (13.6)	46.0 (7.8)	37.0 (2.8)	53.4 (11.9)
Mean daily minimum °F (°C)	24.4 (−4.2)	25.7 (−3.5)	32.3 (0.2)	41.7 (5.4)	51.7 (10.9)	61.5 (16.4)	67.9 (19.9)	67.0 (19.4)	59.8 (15.4)	48.3 (9.1)	38.4 (3.6)	30.2 (−1.0)	45.7 (7.6)
Mean minimum °F (°C)	6.6 (−14.1)	9.9 (−12.3)	17.6 (−8.0)	30.4 (−0.9)	40.8 (4.9)	49.8 (9.9)	59.1 (15.1)	56.9 (13.8)	46.2 (7.9)	34.2 (1.2)	23.9 (−4.5)	15.6 (−9.1)	4.6 (−15.2)
Record low °F (°C)	−7 (−22)	−6 (−21)	4 (−16)	18 (−8)	31 (−1)	41 (5)	49 (9)	44 (7)	36 (2)	26 (−3)	13 (−11)	−4 (−20)	−7 (−22)
Average precipitation inches (mm)	3.18 (81)	3.12 (79)	4.09 (104)	4.16 (106)	3.58 (91)	3.77 (96)	3.32 (84)	3.98 (101)	3.96 (101)	3.84 (98)	3.11 (79)	3.98 (101)	44.09 (1,120)
Average snowfall inches (cm)	8.5 (22)	10.7 (27)	7.0 (18)	0.9 (2.3)	0.0 (0.0)	0.0 (0.0)	0.0 (0.0)	0.0 (0.0)	0.0 (0.0)	0.1 (0.25)	0.9 (2.3)	5.5 (14)	33.6 (85)
Average precipitation days (≥ 0.01 in)	11.2	10.4	11.2	11.4	12.1	11.2	8.9	9.2	8.2	9.9	9.4	11.5	124.7
Average snowy days (≥ 0.1 in)	4.5	4.2	2.6	0.3	0.0	0.0	0.0	0.0	0.0	0.1	0.4	2.9	14.8
Average relative humidity (%)	66.1	65.8	65.9	63.9	70.2	73.6	73.0	73.9	74.1	70.3	70.2	69.6	69.7
Average dew point °F (°C)	18.0 (−7.8)	18.7 (−7.4)	26.4 (−3.1)	34.3 (1.3)	46.8 (8.2)	57.4 (14.1)	63.1 (17.3)	63.5 (17.5)	57.2 (14.0)	45.9 (7.7)	36.0 (2.2)	24.6 (−4.1)	41.0 (5.0)
Source: NOAA

See or edit raw graph data.

Climate data for Danbury, Connecticut (1991–2020 normals, extremes 1937–present)
Month	Jan	Feb	Mar	Apr	May	Jun	Jul	Aug	Sep	Oct	Nov	Dec	Year
Record high °F (°C)	71 (22)	78 (26)	92 (33)	95 (35)	97 (36)	105 (41)	106 (41)	104 (40)	100 (38)	91 (33)	82 (28)	80 (27)	106 (41)
Mean maximum °F (°C)	57.9 (14.4)	58.6 (14.8)	69.1 (20.6)	83.3 (28.5)	90.3 (32.4)	93.7 (34.3)	96.0 (35.6)	93.6 (34.2)	87.7 (30.9)	79.2 (26.2)	69.3 (20.7)	59.2 (15.1)	97.7 (36.5)
Mean daily maximum °F (°C)	36.1 (2.3)	39.8 (4.3)	47.9 (8.8)	61.0 (16.1)	71.8 (22.1)	80.6 (27.0)	85.5 (29.7)	82.2 (27.9)	75.1 (23.9)	63.2 (17.3)	51.1 (10.6)	40.5 (4.7)	61.2 (16.2)
Daily mean °F (°C)	28.0 (−2.2)	30.2 (−1.0)	37.8 (3.2)	49.7 (9.8)	60.0 (15.6)	69.3 (20.7)	74.4 (23.6)	72.3 (22.4)	64.4 (18.0)	52.7 (11.5)	41.9 (5.5)	32.5 (0.3)	51.1 (10.6)
Mean daily minimum °F (°C)	19.9 (−6.7)	21.1 (−6.1)	27.9 (−2.3)	38.5 (3.6)	48.2 (9.0)	58.1 (14.5)	63.4 (17.4)	61.8 (16.6)	54.0 (12.2)	42.2 (5.7)	32.7 (0.4)	24.9 (−3.9)	41.1 (5.0)
Mean minimum °F (°C)	1.3 (−17.1)	5.2 (−14.9)	12.0 (−11.1)	25.1 (−3.8)	34.3 (1.3)	44.4 (6.9)	52.5 (11.4)	49.8 (9.9)	38.7 (3.7)	28.0 (−2.2)	18.0 (−7.8)	8.7 (−12.9)	−1.4 (−18.6)
Record low °F (°C)	−18 (−28)	−16 (−27)	−9 (−23)	14 (−10)	25 (−4)	35 (2)	38 (3)	37 (3)	23 (−5)	16 (−9)	0 (−18)	−11 (−24)	−18 (−28)
Average precipitation inches (mm)	3.74 (95)	3.28 (83)	4.43 (113)	4.17 (106)	4.23 (107)	4.83 (123)	4.98 (126)	4.88 (124)	4.89 (124)	4.97 (126)	4.02 (102)	4.65 (118)	56.04 (1,423)
Average snowfall inches (cm)	15.7 (40)	11.0 (28)	10.4 (26)	1.7 (4.3)	0.0 (0.0)	0.0 (0.0)	0.0 (0.0)	0.0 (0.0)	0.0 (0.0)	0.0 (0.0)	1.9 (4.8)	8.6 (22)	49.3 (125)
Average extreme snow depth inches (cm)	7 (18)	9 (23)	6 (15)	1 (2.5)	0 (0)	0 (0)	0 (0)	0 (0)	0 (0)	0 (0)	1 (2.5)	5 (13)	12 (30)
Average precipitation days (≥ 0.01 in)	12.0	10.8	12.3	12.1	13.1	12.0	10.7	9.6	9.6	10.2	9.9	12.0	134.3
Average snowy days (≥ 0.1 in)	8.0	6.0	4.7	1.0	0.0	0.0	0.0	0.0	0.0	0.2	1.2	5.5	26.6
Source: NOAA

== Demographics ==
Historical population
Census	Pop.	Note	%±
1790	36,290		—
1800	38,208		5.3%
1810	41,050		7.4%
1820	42,739		4.1%
1830	47,010		10.0%
1840	49,917		6.2%
1850	59,775		19.7%
1860	77,476		29.6%
1870	95,276		23.0%
1880	112,042		17.6%
1890	150,081		34.0%
1900	184,203		22.7%
1910	245,322		33.2%
1920	320,936		30.8%
1930	386,702		20.5%
1940	418,384		8.2%
1950	504,342		20.5%
1960	653,589		29.6%
1970	792,814		21.3%
1980	807,143		1.8%
1990	827,645		2.5%
2000	882,567		6.6%
2010	916,829		3.9%
2020	957,419		4.4%
2021 (est.)	958,768	▲	0.1%
U.S. Decennial Census; 1790–1960 1900–1990; 1990–2000 2010–2020

=== Racial and ethnic composition ===
Fairfield County, Connecticut – Racial and ethnic composition Note: the US Census treats Hispanic/Latino as an ethnic category. This table excludes Latinos from the racial categories and assigns them to a separate category. Hispanics/Latinos may be of any race.
Race / Ethnicity (NH = Non-Hispanic)	Pop 1980	Pop 1990	Pop 2000	Pop 2010	Pop 2020	% 1980	% 1990	% 2000	% 2010	% 2020
White alone (NH)	687,187	660,337	645,152	606,716	552,125	85.14%	79.79%	73.10%	66.18%	57.67%
Black or African American alone (NH)	64,334	77,472	84,724	92,705	99,992	7.97%	9.36%	9.60%	10.11%	10.44%
Native American or Alaska Native alone (NH)	877	1,008	1,045	967	858	0.11%	0.12%	0.12%	0.11%	0.09%
Asian alone (NH)	6,006	16,796	28,473	41,801	50,751	0.74%	2.03%	3.23%	4.56%	5.30%
Native Hawaiian or Pacific Islander alone (NH)	x	x	246	256	173	x	x	0.03%	0.03%	0.02%
Other race alone (NH)	3,627	1,214	3,396	5,695	11,232	0.45%	0.15%	0.38%	0.62%	1.17%
Mixed race or Multiracial (NH)	x	x	14,696	13,664	36,937	x	x	1.67%	1.49%	3.86%
Hispanic or Latino (any race)	45,112	70,818	104,835	155,025	205,351	5.59%	8.56%	11.88%	16.91%	21.45%
Total	807,143	827,645	882,567	916,829	957,419	100.00%	100.00%	100.00%	100.00%	100.00%

=== 2020 census ===
As of the 2020 census, the county had a population of 957,419. Of the residents, 22.4% were under the age of 18 and 16.2% were 65 years of age or older; the median age was 40.3 years. For every 100 females there were 94.1 males, and for every 100 females age 18 and over there were 91.2 males. 94.5% of residents lived in urban areas and 5.5% lived in rural areas.

The racial makeup of the county was 61.0% White, 11.2% Black or African American, 0.5% American Indian and Alaska Native, 5.4% Asian, 0.0% Native Hawaiian and Pacific Islander, 11.2% from some other race, and 10.7% from two or more races. Hispanic or Latino residents of any race comprised 21.4% of the population.

There were 354,084 households in the county, of which 33.4% had children under the age of 18 living with them and 27.6% had a female householder with no spouse or partner present. About 25.1% of all households were made up of individuals and 11.1% had someone living alone who was 65 years of age or older.

There were 378,479 housing units, of which 6.4% were vacant. Among occupied housing units, 63.9% were owner-occupied and 36.1% were renter-occupied. The homeowner vacancy rate was 1.4% and the rental vacancy rate was 6.1%.

=== 2010 census ===
As of the 2010 United States census, there were 916,829 people, 335,545 households, and 232,896 families residing in the county. The population density was 1,467.2 inhabitants per square mile (566.5/km^{2}). There were 361,221 housing units at an average density of 578.1 per square mile (223.2/km^{2}). The racial makeup of the county was 74.8% white, 10.8% black or African American, 4.6% Asian, 0.3% American Indian, 6.8% from other races, and 2.6% from two or more races. Those of Hispanic or Latino origin made up 16.9% of the population. In terms of ancestry, 18.1% were Italian, 15.9% were Irish, 9.8% were German, 8.7% were English, 5.5% were Polish, and 2.7% were American.

Of the 335,545 households, 36.4% had children under the age of 18 living with them, 53.1% were married couples living together, 12.3% had a female householder with no husband present, 30.6% were non-families, and 24.9% of all households were made up of individuals. The average household size was 2.68 and the average family size was 3.21. The median age was 39.5 years.

The median income for a household in the county was $81,268 and the median income for a family was $100,593. Males had a median income of $70,187 versus $50,038 for females. The per capita income for the county was $48,295. About 5.6% of families and 8.0% of the population were below the poverty line, including 9.4% of those under age 18 and 6.4% of those age 65 or over.

=== 2000 census ===
As of the census of 2000, there were 882,567 people, 324,232 households, and 228,259 families residing in the county. The population density was 1,410 inhabitants per square mile (540/km^{2}). There were 339,466 housing units at an average density of 542 per square mile (209/km^{2}). The racial makeup of the county was 79.31% White, 10.01% Black or African American, 0.20% Native American, 3.25% Asian, 0.04% Pacific Islander, 4.70% from other races, and 2.49% from two or more races. 11.88% of the population were Hispanic or Latino of any race. 17.6% were of Italian, 12.4% Irish, 6.5% German and 6.4% English ancestry.

In 2010, 66.2% of Fairfield County's population was non-Hispanic whites and 10.8% of the population was black. Asians were 4.6% of the population. Hispanics now constituted 16.9% of the population.

As of 2000, 76.2% spoke English, 11.0% Spanish, 2.0% Portuguese, 1.7% Italian and 1.1% French as their first language. Some of the last group were Haitians, although other Haitians would identify Haitian Creole as their first language.

There were 324,232 households, out of which 34.20% had children under the age of 18 living with them, 55.50% were married couples living together, 11.50% had a female householder with no husband present, and 29.60% were non-families. 24.00% of all households were made up of individuals, and 9.40% had someone living alone who was 65 years of age or older. The average household size was 2.67 and the average family size was 3.18.

In the county, the population was spread out, with 25.60% under the age of 18, 7.00% from 18 to 24, 30.90% from 25 to 44, 23.30% from 45 to 64, and 13.30% who were 65 years of age or older. The median age was 37 years. For every 100 females, there were 93.40 males. For every 100 females age 18 and over, there were 89.60 males.

The median income for a household in the county was $65,249, and the median income for a family was $77,690. Males had a median income of $51,996 versus $37,108 for females. The per capita income for the county was $38,350. About 5.00% of families and 6.90% of the population were below the poverty line, including 8.30% of those under age 18 and 6.60% of those age 65 or over.

=== Demographic breakdown by town ===
==== Income ====
Data is from the 2010 United States Census and the 2006–2010 American Community Survey 5-Year Estimates.

Town		Per capita income	Median household income	Median family income	Population	Number of households
Bethel	Town	$36,608	$83,483	$99,568	18,584	6,938
Bridgeport	City	$19,854	$41,047	$47,894	144,229	51,255
Brookfield	Town	$58,715	$119,370	$136,682	17,550	6,427
Danbury	City	$31,461	$65,275	$74,420	80,893	28,907
Darien	Town	$95,577	$175,766	$211,313	20,732	6,698
Easton	Town	$63,405	$140,370	$163,194	7,490	2,577
Fairfield	Town	$55,733	$113,248	$138,067	59,404	20,457
Greenwich	Town	$92,759	$124,958	$167,825	61,171	23,076
Monroe	Town	$43,842	$109,727	$119,357	19,479	6,735
New Canaan	Town	$100,824	$179,338	$220,278	19,738	7,010
New Fairfield	Town	$39,486	$101,067	$108,720	13,881	4,802
Newtown	Town	$45,308	$108,148	$120,507	27,560	9,459
Newtown	Borough	$43,916	$106,141	$109,821	1,941	696
Norwalk	City	$43,303	$76,161	$93,009	85,603	33,217
Redding	Town	$65,594	$130,557	$145,833	9,158	3,470
Ridgefield	Town	$72,026	$132,907	$166,036	24,638	8,801
Sherman	Town	$48,637	$115,417	$129,177	3,581	1,388
Shelton	City	$38,341	$80,656	$97,211	39,559	15,325
Stratford	Town	$32,590	$67,530	$83,369	51,384	20,095
Stamford	City	$44,667	$75,579	$88,050	122,643	47,357
Trumbull	Town	$44,006	$102,059	$117,855	36,018	12,725
Weston	Town	$92,735	$209,630	$242,361	10,179	3,379
Westport	Town	$90,792	$150,771	$182,659	26,391	9,573
Wilton	Town	$78,234	$153,770	$181,763	18,062	6,172

==== Race ====
Data is from the 2007–2011 American Community Survey 5-Year Estimates, ACS Demographic and Housing Estimates, "Race alone or in combination with one or more other races."

Rank	Town		Population	White	Black	Asian	American Indian	Other	Hispanic
1	Bridgeport	City	143,412	49.8%	35.9%	3.9%	0.6%	11.8%	36.7%
2	Stamford	City	121,784	61.0%	15.5%	8.7%	0.3%	16.3%	24.4%
3	Norwalk	City	85,145	77.2%	14.0%	4.3%	0.6%	6.0%	20.2%
4	Danbury	City	80,101	74.2%	8.7%	6.5%	1.2%	13.0%	25.1%
5	Greenwich	Town	61,023	87.1%	2.3%	7.6%	0.2%	3.9%	9.0%
6	Fairfield	Town	59,078	92.9%	1.8%	5.0%	0.2%	1.4%	4.4%
7	Stratford	Town	51,116	79.5%	14.2%	3.7%	0.5%	4.1%	15.3%
8	Shelton	City	39,310	92.6%	2.0%	2.5%	0.3%	3.1%	7.1%
9	Trumbull	Town	35,752	91.9%	2.4%	5.4%	0.2%	1.5%	6.0%
10	Newtown	Town	27,235	92.7%	2.0%	3.4%	0.5%	3.0%	6.0%
11	Westport	Town	26,249	93.3%	1.4%	5.4%	0.1%	1.5%	3.6%
12	Ridgefield	Town	24,469	96.0%	1.0%	3.2%	0.3%	0.7%	3.2%
13	Darien	Town	20,580	95.2%	0.8%	3.8%	0.1%	1.3%	3.7%
14	New Canaan	Town	19,642	96.4%	1.0%	2.5%	0.3%	0.8%	1.8%
15	Monroe	Town	19,398	96.9%	0.2%	2.4%	0.1%	0.7%	4.5%
16	Bethel	Town	18,584	90.5%	2.5%	5.1%	0.4%	3.5%	7.6%
17	Wilton	Town	17,973	93.2%	1.2%	5.7%	0.0%	1.0%	2.8%
18	Brookfield	Town	16,339	92.0%	1.6%	6.1%	0.4%	0.9%	4.4%
19	New Fairfield	Town	13,847	95.3%	0.6%	0.9%	0.6%	3.6%	6.5%
20	Weston	Town	10,142	96.1%	1.7%	3.0%	0.6%	0.8%	2.9%
21	Redding	Town	9,058	95.7%	1.8%	2.8%	2.1%	0.3%	2.6%
22	Easton	Town	7,452	96.7%	1.3%	2.5%	0.0%	0.0%	2.2%
23	Sherman	Town	3,598	100.0%	0.0%	0.0%	0.0%	0.0%	1.6%
24	Newtown	Borough	2,035	97.7%	0.8%	2.0%	0.9%	0.5%	2.7%

== Economy ==
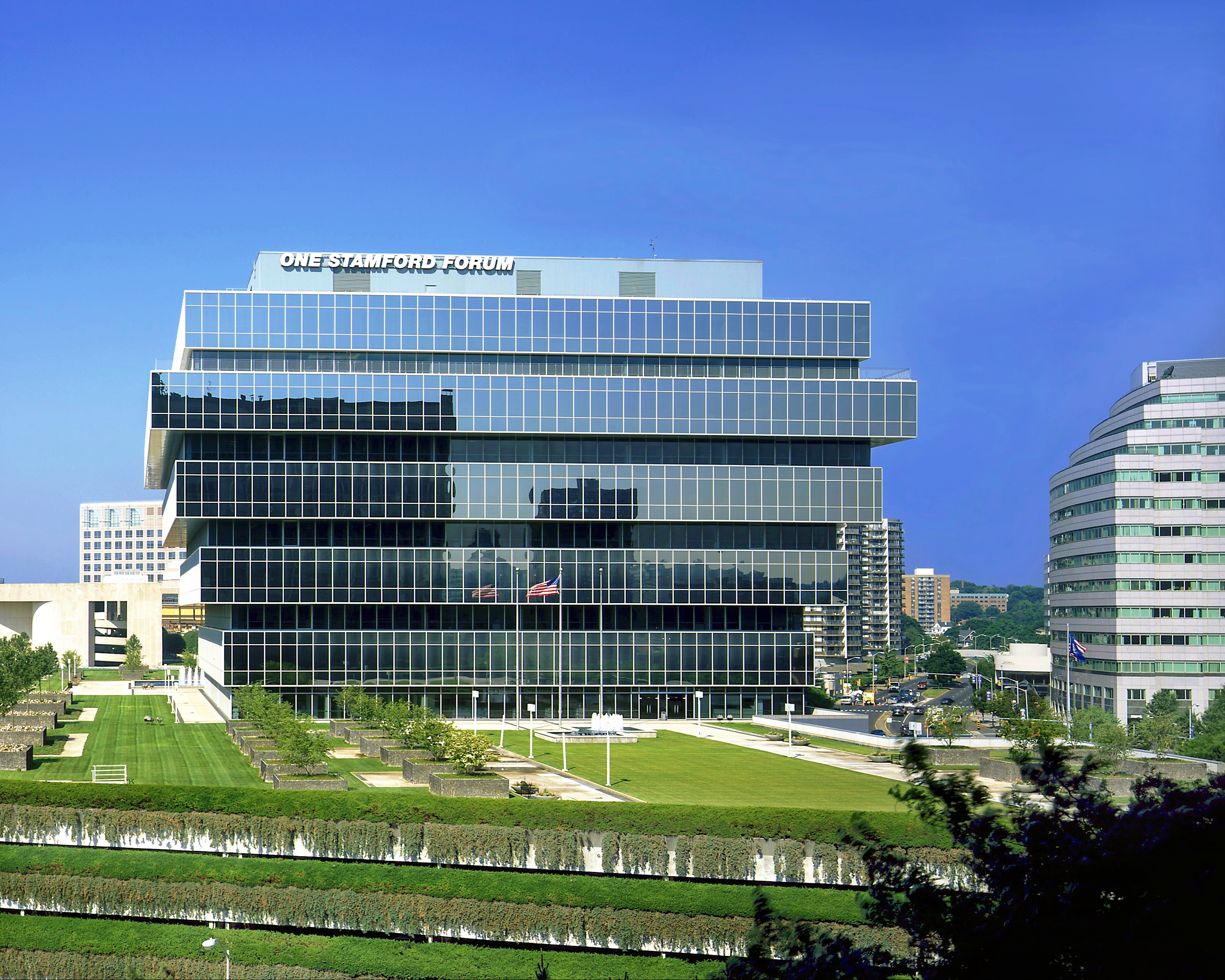
One Stamford Forum, the global headquarters of Purdue Pharma

In the late 1960s and early 1970s, corporations began moving their headquarters to Fairfield County from Manhattan; Thomas J. Lueck of The New York Times said that the trend "permanently decentralized big business in the New York region." During the 1980s many buyouts and reorganizations and an economic recession lead to companies vacating much of the suburban office space in Fairfield County. In 1992 Fairfield County had the headquarters of over 25 major multinational corporations, giving it the third largest concentration of those companies in the United States after New York City and Chicago.

Fairfield County is home to a large concentration of hedge funds and private equity firms, with many located along the Gold Coast in places like Greenwich, Stamford, and Westport. Major hedge funds headquartered in Fairfield County include Bridgewater Associates, AQR Capital, Point72 Asset Management, Lone Pine Capital, Viking Global Investors, and Tudor Investment Corporation.

Fairfield County is the top location for aquaculture in the state.

== Government and municipal services ==
As of 1960, counties in Connecticut do not have any associated county government structure. Thus Fairfield County is only a geographical point of reference. All municipal services are provided by the towns, who sometimes will share certain resources through regionalization. In order to address issues concerning more than one town, several regional agencies that help coordinate the towns for infrastructure, land use, and economic development concerns have been established. Within the geographical area of Fairfield County, the regional agencies are:

- Greater Bridgeport
- South Western
- The Valley (partly in New Haven County)
- Housatonic Valley (partly in Litchfield County)

=== County municipal buildings ===
Several former county municipal buildings are used by other state or local agencies, including:

- The Fairfield County Jail in Bridgeport on the corner of North Avenue and Madison Avenue, still actively used to house prisoners.
- The Fairfield County Court Houses in Bridgeport and Danbury which served the county's judicial needs and housed county deputy sheriff's until December 2000. The court houses are still marked "Fairfield County Court House".

=== Law enforcement ===
Law enforcement within the geographic area of the county is provided by the respective town police departments, whereas in other states in the region such as New York and Vermont law enforcement would be provided by the local county sheriff's department. In the less dense areas, such as Sherman, law enforcement is primarily provided by the Connecticut State Police. Prior to 2000, a County Sheriff's Department existed for the purpose of executing judicial warrants, prisoner transport, court security, Bailiff, and county and state executions. These responsibilities have now been taken over by the Connecticut State Marshal System.

Some municipalities in the county still maintain a sheriff's department to fill the void of the abolishment of the county sheriff's department, such as the City of Shelton which has established the Shelton Sheriff's Department to carry out warrants in the city.

=== Judicial ===
The geographic area of the county is served by the three separate judicial districts: Danbury, Stamford-Norwalk, and Fairfield. Each judicial district has a superior court located, respectively, in Danbury, Stamford, and Bridgeport. Each judicial district has one or more geographical area courts ("GA"'s), subdivisions of the judicial districts that handle lesser cases such as criminal misdemeanors, small claims, traffic violations, and other civil actions.

=== Fire protection ===
Fire protection in the county is provided by the towns. Several towns also have fire districts that provide services to a section of the town.

=== Education ===
Education in the county is usually provided by the town governments. The exceptions are the towns of Redding and Easton at the secondary level, as those two joined to form a regional secondary school district (Region 9).

School districts include:

K-12:

- Bethel School District
- Bridgeport School District
- Brookfield School District
- Danbury School District
- Darien School District
- Fairfield School District
- Greenwich School District
- Monroe School District
- New Canaan School District
- New Fairfield School District
- Newtown School District
- Norwalk School District
- Ridgefield School District
- Shelton School District
- Stamford School District
- Stratford School District
- Trumbull School District
- Weston School District
- Westport School District
- Wilton School District

Secondary:

- Regional High School District 09

Elementary:

- Easton School District
- Redding School District
- Sherman School District

Private schools:

- Convent of the Sacred Heart
- Eagle Hill School
- Greens Farms Academy
- Greenwich Academy
- Greenwich Country Day School
- Immaculate High School
- Japanese School of New York (Greenwich Japanese School)
- Stanwich School
- Whitby School
- Wooster School

Closed schools:

- Carmel Academy
- Curtis School for Boys

=== Crime rate ===
Fairfield County has a low crime index of 2050.2 (per 100,000 citizens) as well as a murder closure rate of over 70%. Several Governmental agencies, as well as private security contractors, have made note of Fairfield's low crime rates and the county currently has 6 cities and towns with a percentile safety index of 90% or higher compared to the rest of the continental United States (based on violent and property crimes).

=== Politics ===
As with neighboring Westchester County, Fairfield County was generally a Republican stronghold for much of the 20th century. Urban municipalities such as Stamford, Norwalk and Bridgeport trended Democratic, while the suburban and rural enclaves tended to lean Republican. However, during the 1990s, these latter areas began to increasingly shift towards Democratic candidates. Today, only Hartford County has a higher concentration of Democratic voters. The last time the county voted for a Republican presidential candidate was in 1992 for George H. W. Bush.

United States presidential election results for Fairfield County, Connecticut
Year	Republican		Democratic		Third party(ies)	
Year	No.	%	No.	%	No.	%
1836	2,317	46.08%	2,711	53.92%	0	0.00%
1840	4,870	55.77%	3,862	44.23%	0	0.00%
1844	5,368	53.10%	4,599	45.49%	142	1.40%
1848	5,036	52.63%	4,064	42.47%	469	4.90%
1852	4,814	47.49%	5,155	50.86%	167	1.65%
1856	6,233	49.08%	5,539	43.61%	928	7.31%
1860	7,025	43.66%	3,177	19.74%	5,890	36.60%
1864	7,368	50.60%	7,193	49.40%	0	0.00%
1868	8,613	51.12%	8,234	48.88%	0	0.00%
1872	8,401	49.66%	8,515	50.34%	0	0.00%
1876	10,203	47.10%	11,416	52.70%	43	0.20%
1880	12,009	49.67%	12,063	49.89%	108	0.45%
1884	12,293	47.41%	12,966	50.01%	669	2.58%
1888	14,934	48.41%	15,251	49.44%	663	2.15%
1892	15,777	45.92%	18,006	52.41%	572	1.66%
1896	22,396	62.21%	12,463	34.62%	1,139	3.16%
1900	21,317	57.10%	15,455	41.40%	560	1.50%
1904	23,490	58.22%	15,796	39.15%	1,063	2.63%
1908	24,064	58.99%	14,917	36.57%	1,812	4.44%
1912	13,147	31.53%	15,663	37.56%	12,893	30.92%
1916	25,962	53.78%	20,873	43.24%	1,442	2.99%
1920	55,251	66.48%	24,761	29.79%	3,101	3.73%
1924	58,041	66.22%	18,815	21.47%	10,788	12.31%
1928	71,410	55.81%	55,491	43.37%	1,047	0.82%
1932	72,238	49.92%	64,367	44.48%	8,092	5.59%
1936	67,846	41.56%	87,329	53.49%	8,088	4.95%
1940	91,190	49.10%	93,688	50.45%	829	0.45%
1944	103,693	50.51%	99,181	48.31%	2,423	1.18%
1948	118,636	54.65%	90,767	41.81%	7,669	3.53%
1952	167,278	60.72%	106,403	38.62%	1,812	0.66%
1956	199,841	70.19%	84,890	29.81%	0	0.00%
1960	167,778	53.39%	146,442	46.60%	6	0.00%
1964	125,576	39.17%	194,782	60.75%	261	0.08%
1968	173,108	51.78%	139,364	41.69%	21,820	6.53%
1972	233,188	64.00%	125,128	34.34%	6,050	1.66%
1976	209,458	58.15%	148,353	41.18%	2,413	0.67%
1980	201,997	54.88%	124,074	33.71%	42,027	11.42%
1984	257,319	65.78%	132,253	33.81%	1,607	0.41%
1988	221,316	59.04%	149,630	39.91%	3,932	1.05%
1992	175,158	42.78%	160,202	39.13%	74,050	18.09%
1996	144,632	41.06%	172,337	48.93%	35,258	10.01%
2000	159,659	43.12%	193,769	52.33%	16,861	4.55%
2004	189,605	47.29%	205,902	51.35%	5,460	1.36%
2008	167,736	40.54%	242,936	58.72%	3,069	0.74%
2012	175,168	44.22%	217,294	54.85%	3,668	0.93%
2016	160,077	38.00%	243,852	57.89%	17,280	4.10%
2020	169,039	35.74%	297,505	62.90%	6,446	1.36%
2024	178,263	39.41%	267,019	59.04%	7,021	1.55%

United States Senate election results for Fairfield County, Connecticut1
Year	Republican		Democratic		Third party(ies)	
Year	No.	%	No.	%	No.	%
2012	179,440	46.37%	202,539	52.34%	4,984	1.29%
2018	131,321	37.31%	217,601	61.82%	3,083	0.88%
2024	168,556	38.27%	265,597	60.30%	6,273	1.42%

United States Senate election results for Fairfield County, Connecticut2
Year	Republican		Democratic		Third party(ies)	
Year	No.	%	No.	%	No.	%
2010	134,242	47.15%	146,926	51.60%	3,555	1.25%
2016	148,935	36.62%	249,887	61.44%	7,887	1.94%
2022	126,757	40.44%	186,698	59.56%	7	0.00%

Connecticut Gubernatorial election results for Fairfield County
Year	Republican		Democratic		Third party(ies)	
Year	No.	%	No.	%	No.	%
2010	144,795	51.07%	136,501	48.14%	2,228	0.79%
2014	128,629	49.69%	128,714	49.72%	1,530	0.59%
2018	160,641	45.22%	188,334	53.01%	6,283	1.77%
2022	128,434	40.59%	185,900	58.76%	2,056	0.65%

== Hospitals ==
- Bridgeport Hospital
- Danbury Hospital
- Greenwich Hospital
- Norwalk Hospital
- St. Vincent's Medical Center (Bridgeport) in Bridgeport
- Stamford Hospital

== Transportation ==
=== Mass transit ===
With Interstate 95 and the Merritt Parkway increasingly clogged with traffic, state officials are looking toward mass transit to ease the county's major thoroughfares' traffic burden.

New office buildings are being concentrated near railroad stations in Stamford, Bridgeport and other municipalities in the county to allow for more rail commuting. Proximity to Stamford's Metro-North train station was cited by the Royal Bank of Scotland as a key reason for locating its new U.S. headquarters building in downtown Stamford; construction on the office tower started in late 2006.

==== Air ====
Within Fairfield County there are two regional airports: Igor I. Sikorsky Memorial Airport in Stratford and the Danbury Municipal Airport in Danbury. The county is also served by larger airports such as Bradley International Airport, John F. Kennedy International Airport, LaGuardia Airport, Newark Liberty International Airport, Tweed New Haven Regional Airport, and Westchester County Airport.

==== Bus service ====
Connecticut Transit's Stamford division runs local and inter-city buses to the southern part of the county. The Norwalk Transit District serves the Norwalk area in the southern central portion of the county; the Greater Bridgeport Transit Authority serves Bridgeport and eastern Fairfield County; and the Housatonic Area Regional Transit agency serves Danbury and the northern portions of the county.

==== Ferry service ====
The Bridgeport & Port Jefferson Ferry carries passengers and cars from Bridgeport to Port Jefferson, New York, across Long Island Sound.

Ferry lines in and out of Stamford are also in development.

==== Rail ====
Commuter Rail is perhaps Fairfield County's most important transportation artery, as it allows its residents an efficient ride to Grand Central Terminal in New York City. Service is provided on Metro-North's New Haven Line, and every town on the shoreline has at least one station. Connecting lines bring service to New Canaan from Stamford on the New Canaan Branch, and to Danbury from South Norwalk on the Danbury Branch. Many trains run express from New York to Stamford, making it an easy 45-minute ride.

In the 2005 and 2006 sessions of the Legislature, massive appropriations were made to buy replacements for the 343 rail cars for the Metro-North New Haven Line and branch lines. The approximately 30-year-old cars will be replaced with new cars at a rate of ten per month starting in 2010.

Bridgeport and Stamford are also served by Amtrak, and both cities see a significant number of boardings on the Northeast Regional route (Boston to Washington, D.C. with various termini in Virginia). This route also serves other Amtrak stations in Connecticut, including New Haven, Old Saybrook, New London, and Mystic.

=== Major roads ===
==== Boston Post Road ====
U.S. 1 is the oldest east–west route in the county, running through all of its shoreline cities and towns. Known by various names along its length, most commonly "Boston Post Road" or simply "Post Road", it gradually gains latitude from west to east. Thus, U.S. 1 west is officially designated "South" and east is "North".

Though contiguous, U.S. 1 changes name by locality. In Greenwich it is Putnam Avenue. In Stamford, it becomes Main Street or Tresser Boulevard. In Darien, it is Boston Post Road or "the Post Road". In Norwalk, it is Connecticut Avenue in the west, Van Zant St, Cross St, and North Av in the center, and Westport Avenue in the east. In Westport, it is Post Road West from the Norwalk town line until the Saugatuck River, where it becomes Post Road East until Fairfield. In Fairfield, it is again Boston Post Road or "the Post Road". In Bridgeport, it follows Kings Highway in the west, North Avenue in the center, and Boston Avenue in the east. Finally, it becomes Barnum Avenue in Stratford.

==== Interstate 95 ====
The western portions of Interstate 95 in Connecticut are known as the Connecticut Turnpike or the Governor John Davis Lodge Turnpike in Fairfield County and it crosses the state approximately parallel to U.S. Route 1. The road is most commonly referred to as "I-95". The highway is six lanes (sometimes eight lanes) throughout the county. It was completed in 1958 and is often clogged with traffic particularly during morning and evening rush hours.

With the high cost of land along the Gold Coast, state lawmakers do not consider widening the highway to be fiscally feasible, although occasional stretches between entrances and nearby exits are now sometimes connected with a fourth "operational improvement" lane (for instance, westbound between the Exit 10 interchange in Darien and Exit 8 in Stamford).

==== Merritt Parkway ====
The Merritt Parkway, also known as "The Merritt" or Connecticut Route 15, is a truck-free scenic parkway that runs through the county parallel and generally several miles north of Interstate 95. It begins at the New York state line, where it is the Hutchinson River Parkway, and terminates on the Igor I. Sikorsky Memorial Bridge, where it becomes the Wilbur Cross Parkway at the New Haven county line.

The interchange between the Merritt Parkway and Route 7 in Norwalk was completed around the year 2000. The project was held up in a lawsuit won by preservationists concerned about the historic Merritt Parkway bridges. It is now exit 16/17A off the Merritt, and exit 15 off I-95. The parkway is a National Scenic Byway and is listed on the National Register of Historic Places.

==== Interstate 84 ====
Interstate 84, which runs through Danbury, is scheduled to be widened to a six-lane highway at all points between Danbury and Waterbury. State officials say they hope the widening will not only benefit drivers regularly on the route but also entice some cars from the more crowded Interstate 95, which runs roughly parallel to it. Heavier trucks are unlikely to use Interstate 84 more often, however, because the route is much hillier than I-95 according to a state Department of Transportation official.

==== U.S. Route 7 ====
With its southern terminus at Interstate 95 in central Norwalk, U.S. Route 7 heads north through Wilton, Ridgefield, Danbury, and Brookfield to points north of the county. The route follows a path that was part of the pre-Columbian Great Trail. In the 1950s, officials planned to convert all of the route to a four to six lane expressway. The expressway was constructed in the cities of Danbury and Norwalk, but faced significantly opposition that prevented it from being constructed through the towns in between the two. Plans to construct the expressway, known as "Super 7", have been floated throughout the decades, but have faced vocal opposition, and it has never been constructed. In lieu of the expressway, segments of Route 7 in Fairfield County have been widened over the years. Additionally, the expressway in Danbury has expanded north through Brookfield over the decades.

==== Connecticut Route 8 ====
Route 8 terminates in downtown Bridgeport from I-95 with Connecticut Route 25 and goes north. It splits from Connecticut Route 25 at the Bridgeport—Trumbull town line and continues north into southeastern Trumbull and Shelton, then beyond the county through some of towns of the Naugatuck River Valley to Waterbury and beyond. Construction of the route provided some impetus for the creation of office parks in Shelton and home construction there and in other parts of The Valley.

==== Connecticut Route 25 ====
Route 25 starts in downtown Bridgeport from I 95 with Route 8 and goes north. It splits from Connecticut Route 8 at the Bridgeport—Trumbull town line and continues into Trumbull. The limited access divided expressway ends in northern Trumbull, but Route 25 continues into Monroe, Newtown, and Brookfield.

== Sports ==
Team	Sport	League
AC Connecticut	Soccer	USL League Two
Bridgeport Islanders	Ice hockey	American Hockey League
Connecticut Whale	Ice hockey	Premier Hockey Federation
Connecticut Brakettes	Fastpitch softball	USA Softball
Danbury Colonials	Ice hockey	NA3HL
Danbury Hat Tricks	Ice hockey	Federal Prospects Hockey League
Danbury Westerners	Baseball	New England Collegiate Baseball League
Fairfield Yankees RFC	Rugby union	New England Rugby Football Union

Teams that previously called Fairfield County their home include the Connecticut Wildcats of USA Rugby League, the Danbury Whalers and the Danbury Titans of the Federal Hockey League, and the Bridgeport Bluefish in baseball's independent Atlantic League. In addition, being a part of metropolitan New York City, the major professional sports teams of New York State and New Jersey are local teams to Connecticut.

== Communities ==
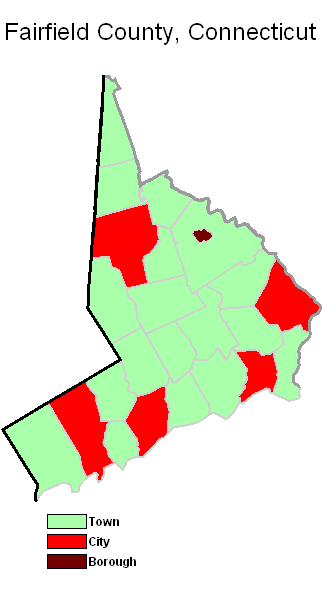
Map of Fairfield County, Connecticut labeling types of municipalities by color. Towns in light green, Cities in Red, and Boroughs in Dark Red

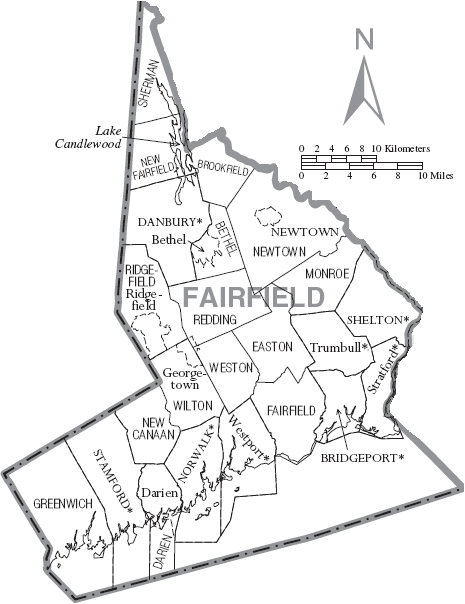
Map of Fairfield County, Connecticut showing cities, boroughs, towns, and CDPs

Note: Villages are named localities within towns, but have no separate corporate existence from the towns they are in.

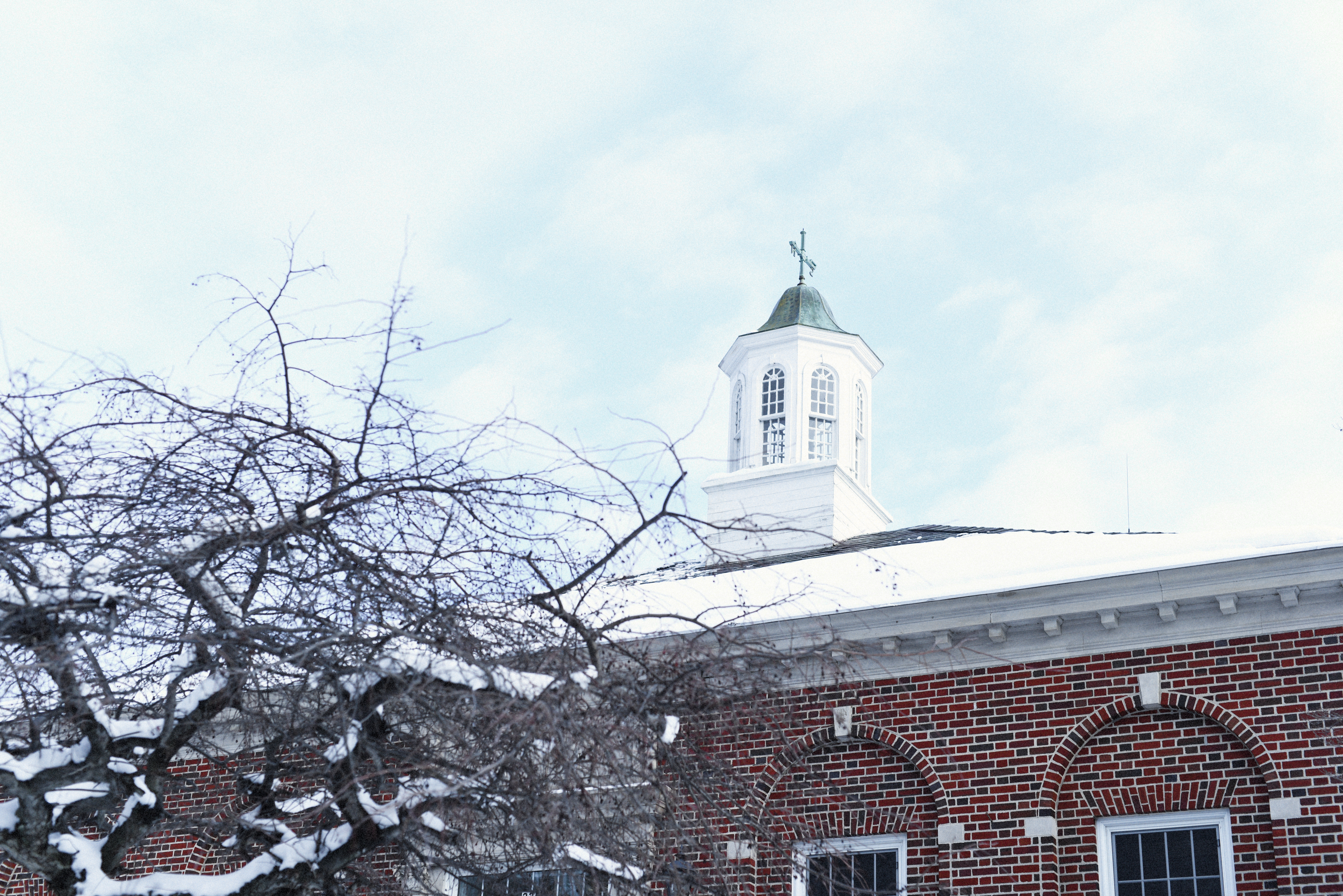
Easton Town Hall

- Bethel (town)
  - Bethel
  - Stony Hill
- Bridgeport (city, former county seat)
  - Beardsly
  - Black Rock
    - Barnum (P.T.)
    - Grover Hill
  - Broadbridge
  - Brooklawn
  - Downtown
  - East End
  - East Side
  - Hollow
  - Lake Forest
  - Little Italy
  - Mill Hill
  - Newfield
  - North Bridgeport
  - North End
    - Trumbull Gardens (Terrace)
  - Ox Hill
  - South End
    - Marina Village
    - Seaside Park
    - University of Bridgeport Campus
  - Steel Point
  - Success
  - West Side
- Brookfield (town)
  - Barkwood Falls
  - Brookfield Center
  - Brookfield Junction
  - Brookfield Town Center
  - Candlewood Lake Club
  - Candlewood Orchards
  - Candlewood Shores
  - East Iron Works
  - Huckleberry Hill
  - Iron Works
  - Long Meadow Hill
  - Obtuse
  - Pocono Ridge
  - Prospect Hill
  - West Iron Works
  - Whisconier
- Danbury (city)
  - Beaverbrook
  - Beckettville
  - Germantown
  - Great Plain
  - Hayestown
  - King Street
  - Lake Waubeeka
  - Little Brazil
  - Long Ridge
  - Mill Plain
  - Miry Brook
  - Pembroke
  - Rivington
  - Starrs Plain
  - Wooster Heights
- Darien (town)
  - Darien (Downtown)
  - Noroton
  - Noroton Heights
  - Tokeneke
- Easton (town)
  - Aspetuck
  - Plattsville
  - Sport Hill
- Fairfield (town)
  - Brooklawn
  - Fairfield Center (Downtown)
  - Fairfield University
  - Greenfield Hill
  - Little Danbury (ghost town)
  - Mill Plain
  - Murray
  - Sacred Heart University
  - Southport
  - Stratfield
  - Tunxis Hill
- Greenwich (town)
  - Back Country
  - Belle Haven
  - Byram
  - Chickahominy
  - Cos Cob
  - Glenville
  - Greenwich (Downtown)
  - Indian Field
  - Mianus
  - Millbrook
  - Old Greenwich
  - Pemberwick
  - Riverside
  - Rock Ridge
  - Round Hill
  - Sound Beach
- Monroe (town)
  - East Village
  - Monroe Center
  - Stepney
  - Stevenson
  - Upper Stepney
- New Canaan (town)
  - New Canaan Center
  - Silvermine (part)
- New Fairfield (town)
  - Ball Pond
  - Bigelow Corners
  - Bogus Hill
  - Candlewood Corner
  - Candlewood Isle
  - Candlewood Knolls
  - Inglenook
  - Kellogg Point
  - Knollcrest
  - New Fairfield Center
  - Sail Harbor
  - Taylor Corners
- Newtown (town)
  - Berkshire
  - Botsford
  - Dodgingtown
  - Hattertown
  - Hawleyville
  - Newtown (incorporated borough)
  - Palestine
  - Sandy Hook
- Norwalk (city)
  - Central Norwalk (Downtown)
  - Cranbury (Norwalk)
  - East Norwalk
  - Rowayton
  - Silvermine (part)
  - South Norwalk (SoNo)
  - Spring Hill
  - Wall Street
  - West Norwalk
- Redding (town)
  - Five Points
  - Georgetown (part)
  - Redding Center
  - Redding Ridge
  - Topstone
  - West Redding
- Ridgefield (town)
  - Branchville
  - Lakes East
  - Lakes West
  - Mamanasco Lake
  - Ridgebury
  - Ridgefield
  - Route 7 Gateway
  - West Mountain
- Shelton (city)
  - Birchbank
  - Booth Hill
  - Coram
  - Downtown
  - Huntington
  - Long Hill
  - Pine Rock Park
  - Sunnyside
  - The Maples
  - Trap Falls
  - Walnut Tree Hill
  - White Hills
- Sherman (town)
  - Lakeside Woods
  - Sherman
- Stamford (city)
  - Belltown
  - Bulls Head
  - Downtown
  - East Side
  - Glenbrook
  - Harbor Point
  - Newfield
  - North Stamford
  - Long Ridge
  - Richmond Hill
  - Roxbury
  - Shippan
  - Shippan Point
  - Springdale
  - South End
  - The Cove
  - Turn of River
  - West Side
  - Westover
  - Woodside
- Stratford (town)
  - Hawley Lane
  - Lordship
  - Oronoque
  - Paradise Green
  - Putney
  - Stratford Center
  - Stratford Downtown
  - Success Hill
- Trumbull (town)
  - Chestnut Hill
  - Daniels Farm
  - Long Hill
  - Nichols
  - Tashua
  - Trumbull Center
- Weston (town)
  - Aspetuck (part)
  - Georgetown (part)
  - Weston village
- Westport (Town)
  - Coleytown
  - Compo
  - Greens Farms
  - Old Hill
  - Poplar Plains
  - Saugatuck
  - Staples
  - Westport Village
- Wilton (town)
  - Cannondale
  - Georgetown (most)
  - Silvermine (part)
  - South Wilton
  - Wilton Center

=== Telephone area codes ===
All communities in the county are in the area code 203/area code 475 overlay except for the town of Sherman which is in area code 860 and part of the geographical New Milford telephone exchange.

== Major media in the county ==
=== Countywide ===
- Fairfield County Weekly

=== Daily newspapers covering the county ===
==== Published within the county ====
- The Advocate of Stamford – Stamford edition, published by Hearst Connecticut Media., a subsidiary of Hearst Communications.
- The Advocate of Stamford – Norwalk edition
- Connecticut Post, owned by Hearst Connecticut Media, published in Bridgeport, covers Eastern Fairfield County and the Naugatuck Valley.
- Greenwich Time, published by ., Hearst Connecticut Media, a subsidiary of Hearst Communications.
- The Hour (registration required), controlled by a trust under the ultimate authority of Norwalk Probate Court.
- The News-Times of Danbury, owned by Hearst Communications, Inc.
- The Fairfield County Business Journal, published by Westfair Communications Inc.
- The Newtown Bee published in Newtown.
- The Darien Times published in Darien.
- The Redding Sentinel published in Redding
- The Easton Courier covers Easton.

==== Spanish language newspapers ====
- El Sol News, countywide, based in Stamford.
- El Canillita, distributed across southwestern Connecticut.
- Pluma Libre, distributed across southwestern Connecticut.

==== Other foreign language newspapers ====
- Haitian Voice, published in English, Haitian Creole and French, based in Bridgeport.
- BrazilNowUSA, covers stories from Fairfield County, Connecticut

=== Broadcast media and cable television ===
- Fairfield County is in the New York City TV market and receives its TV stations. Some TV stations in the Hartford-New Haven are also available to Fairfield County viewers.
- News 12 Connecticut has studios in Norwalk and covers Fairfield County as well as statewide news from Hartford.
- Until 2022, WFSB from Hartford maintained a secondary feed for Fairfield County on their fourth subchannel which was carried by area cable providers; it mainly offered different advertising for local businesses, along with a different programming schedule that addressed syndicated programming which is claimed by New York City stations and would otherwise be blacked out on WFSB.

== Colleges ==
- Housatonic Community College in Bridgeport
- University of Bridgeport in Bridgeport
- University of Connecticut Stamford campus
- Fairfield University in Fairfield
- Norwalk Community College
- St. Vincent's College in Bridgeport
- Sacred Heart University in Fairfield
- Western Connecticut State University in Danbury
- Lincoln Technical Institute in Shelton
- Norwalk Conservatory of the Arts in Norwalk

== Culture and the arts ==
=== Fine arts ===
- Franklin Street Works located in the downtown area of Stamford.
- The Housatonic Museum of Art located at Housatonic Community College in Bridgeport.

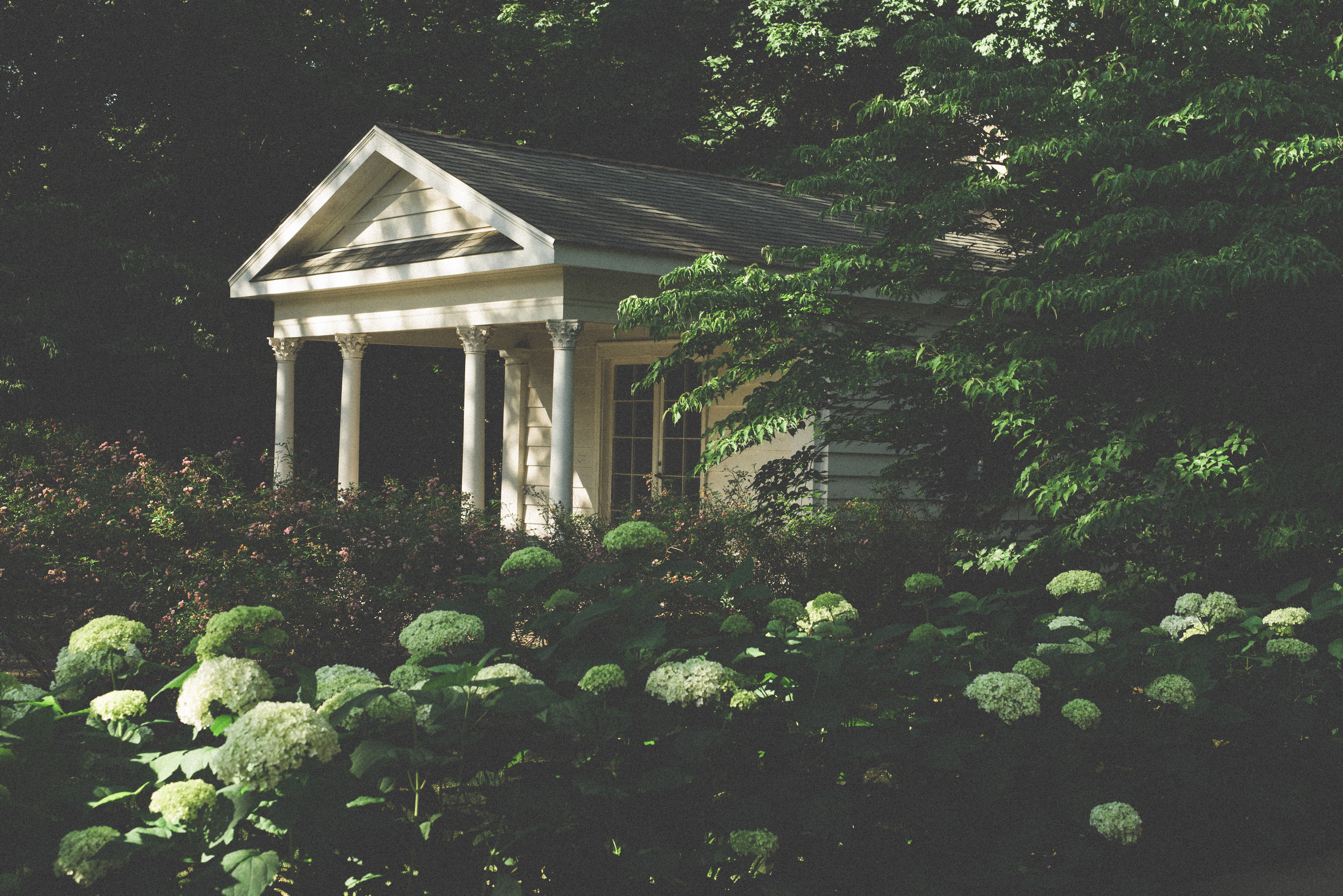
A view of the Tea House in Cranbury Park in Norwalk. The park also has dog walking and frisbee trails, a building for the arts, and a mansion for weddings.

=== Music: orchestras in the county ===
- Greater Bridgeport Symphony. Founded in 1945, its concerts are held at Klein Memorial Auditorium in Bridgeport
- Connecticut Grand Opera, a not-for-profit, professional opera company founded in 1993 and based in Stamford
- Danbury Symphony Orchestra
- Greenwich Symphony Orchestra
- Norwalk Symphony Orchestra, founded in 1939
- Ridgefield Symphony Orchestra
- Orchestra Lumos
- Western Connecticut Youth Orchestra, a not-for-profit organization providing young musicians in the Fairfield County and Upper Westchester County areas with a classical symphony experience

=== Other music and arts events ===
- The Barnum Festival has been held in the Spring in Bridgeport since 1949 to raise money for charity
- The Connecticut Film Festival is held in the Spring in Danbury
- The Fairfield County Freestyle Championships are generally held once a semester on the campus of Sacred Heart University. This event showcases the best freestyle dancers and rappers
- The Gathering of the Vibes musical event has been held in Bridgeport's Seaside Park in 1999, 2000, 2007, and again in 2008
- Musicals at Richter, held every summer in Danbury, is Connecticut's longest running outdoor theater
- The Norwalk Oyster Festival is an annual fair in the city of Norwalk that features craft vendors and live music performances. The festival takes place on the first weekend after Labor Day in Veterans Park, near Long Island Sound

== See also ==
- Historical U.S. Census Totals for Fairfield County, Connecticut
- List of Mountains and Summits in Fairfield County, Connecticut
- List of Registered Historic Places in Fairfield County, Connecticut
