= Lakes West, Connecticut =

Census-designated place in Connecticut, United States

- Census-designated place
- Location within Connecticut Location within the United States
- Coordinates: 41°20′6″N 73°32′0″W
- Country: United States
- State: Connecticut
- County: Fairfield
- Town: Ridgefield

Area
  - Total: 1.36 sq mi (3.53 km^{2})
  - Land: 1.34 sq mi (3.47 km^{2})
  - Water: 0.023 sq mi (0.06 km^{2})
- Elevation: 725 ft (221 m)
- Time zone: UTC-5 (Eastern (EST))
  - Summer (DST): UTC-4 (EDT)
- ZIP Code: 06877 (Ridgefield)
- Area codes: 203/475
- FIPS code: 09-41736
- GNIS feature ID: 2805952

Lakes West is a census-designated place (CDP) in the town of Ridgefield, Fairfield County, Connecticut, United States. It is in the northern part of the town on the north side of Ridgebury Mountain and extending north into a valley occupied by Lake Windwing. It is bordered to the east by the Lakes East CDP and to the northwest by Ridgebury.

As of the 2020 census, Lakes West had a population of 1,186.

Lakes West was first listed as a CDP prior to the 2020 census.

== Demographics ==
=== 2020 census ===
As of the 2020 census, Lakes West had a population of 1,186. The median age was 43.5 years. 26.6% of residents were under the age of 18 and 15.3% of residents were 65 years of age or older. For every 100 females there were 113.7 males, and for every 100 females age 18 and over there were 98.4 males age 18 and over.

100.0% of residents lived in urban areas, while 0.0% lived in rural areas.

There were 384 households in Lakes West, of which 44.0% had children under the age of 18 living in them. Of all households, 83.1% were married-couple households, 8.1% were households with a male householder and no spouse or partner present, and 7.0% were households with a female householder and no spouse or partner present. About 7.3% of all households were made up of individuals and 3.7% had someone living alone who was 65 years of age or older.

There were 402 housing units, of which 4.5% were vacant. The homeowner vacancy rate was 0.3% and the rental vacancy rate was 0.0%.

Racial composition as of the 2020 census
| Race | Number | Percent |
|---|---|---|
| White | 1,046 | 88.2% |
| Black or African American | 8 | 0.7% |
| American Indian and Alaska Native | 3 | 0.3% |
| Asian | 43 | 3.6% |
| Native Hawaiian and Other Pacific Islander | 0 | 0.0% |
| Some other race | 22 | 1.9% |
| Two or more races | 64 | 5.4% |
| Hispanic or Latino (of any race) | 69 | 5.8% |
