= Hayestown, Connecticut =

Lakeside neighborhood Danbury, Connecticut, United States

- Unincorporated area
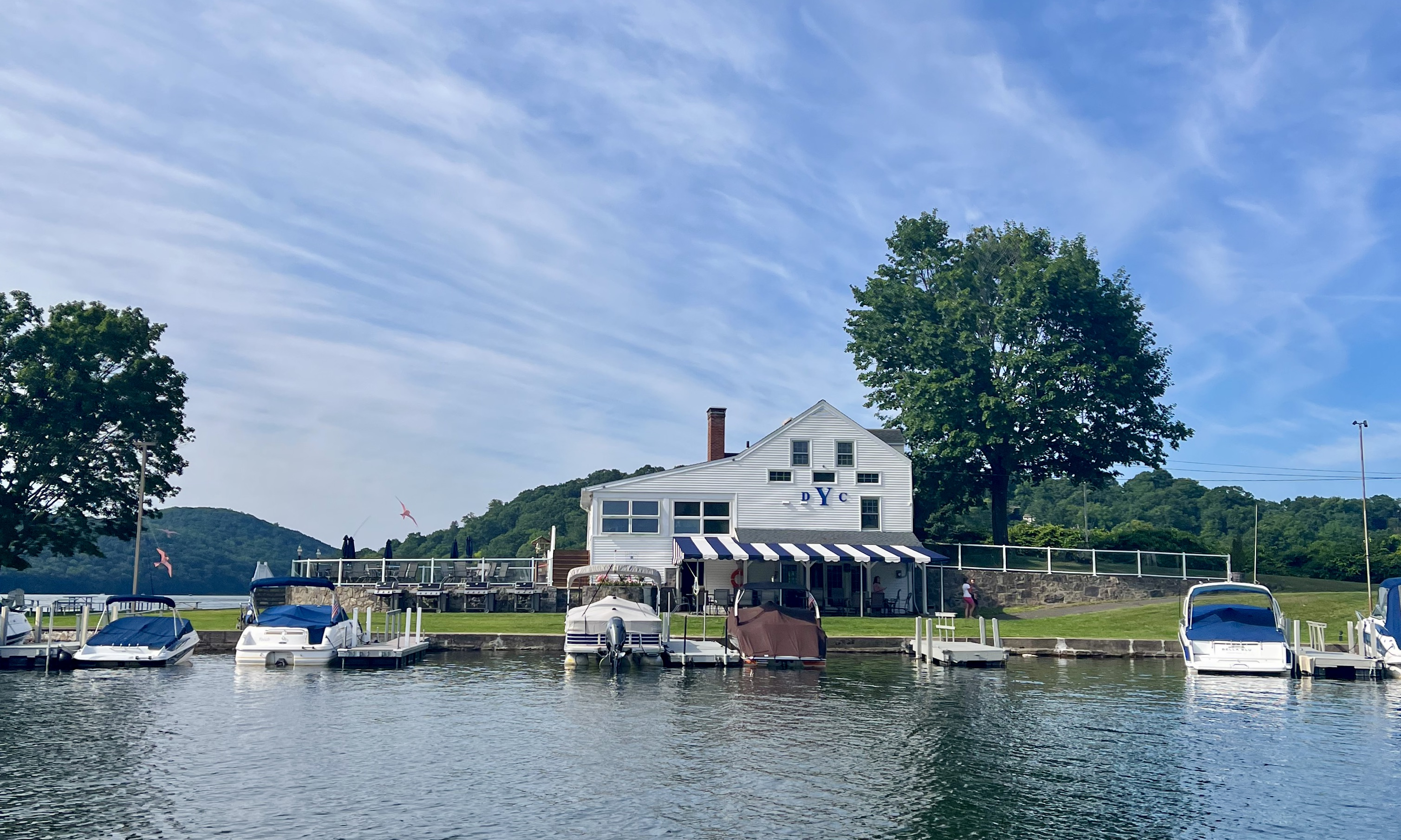
- Danbury Yacht Club, Hayestown Road

- Location in Connecticut Location in the United States
- Coordinates: 41°25′12.35″N 73°27′13.44″W
- Country: United States
- U.S. state: Connecticut
- County: Fairfield
- Region: Western CT
- City: Danbury
- Elevation: 460 ft (140 m)

Hayestown is an unincorporated area in Danbury, Connecticut. It is located in the eastern section of the city, along the southern shoreline of Candlewood Lake, west of Great Plain, northwest of Germantown, and east of Clapboard Ridge.

== History ==
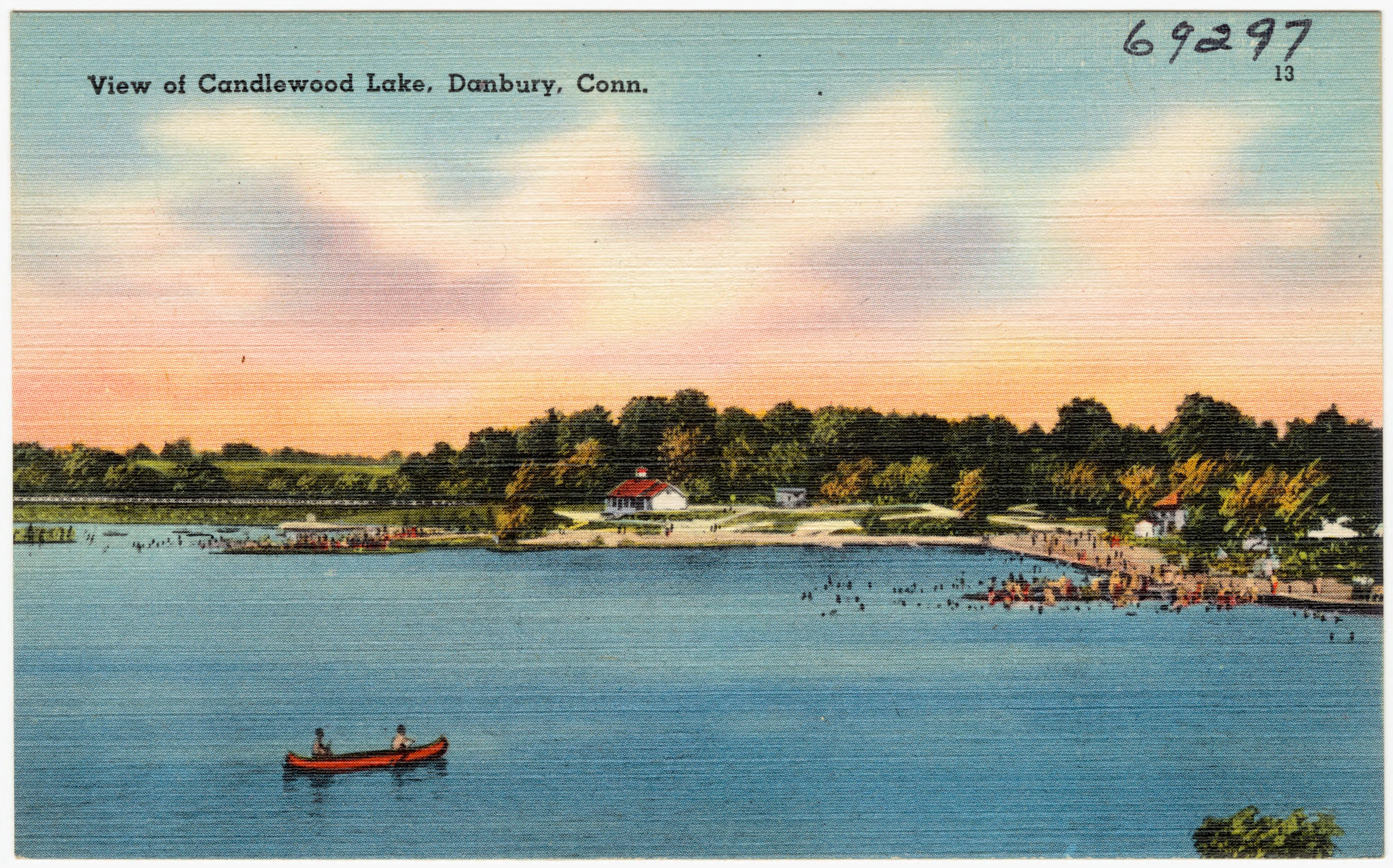
View of Candlewood Lake and Hayestown causeway

Hayestown (sometimes historically spelled Hay's Town) was considered part of the Great Plain District prior to being recognized as a separate settlement. Similar to Great Plain and other neighboring communities, parts of Hayestown were lost to flooding due to the 1928 construction of Candlewood Lake. However, as a result, the area would become known as a tourist destination of sorts, with lodging options for visitors, including Wildman's Landing Lodge, Candlewood Motel, and its own Holiday Inn.

=== Wildman's Landing ===
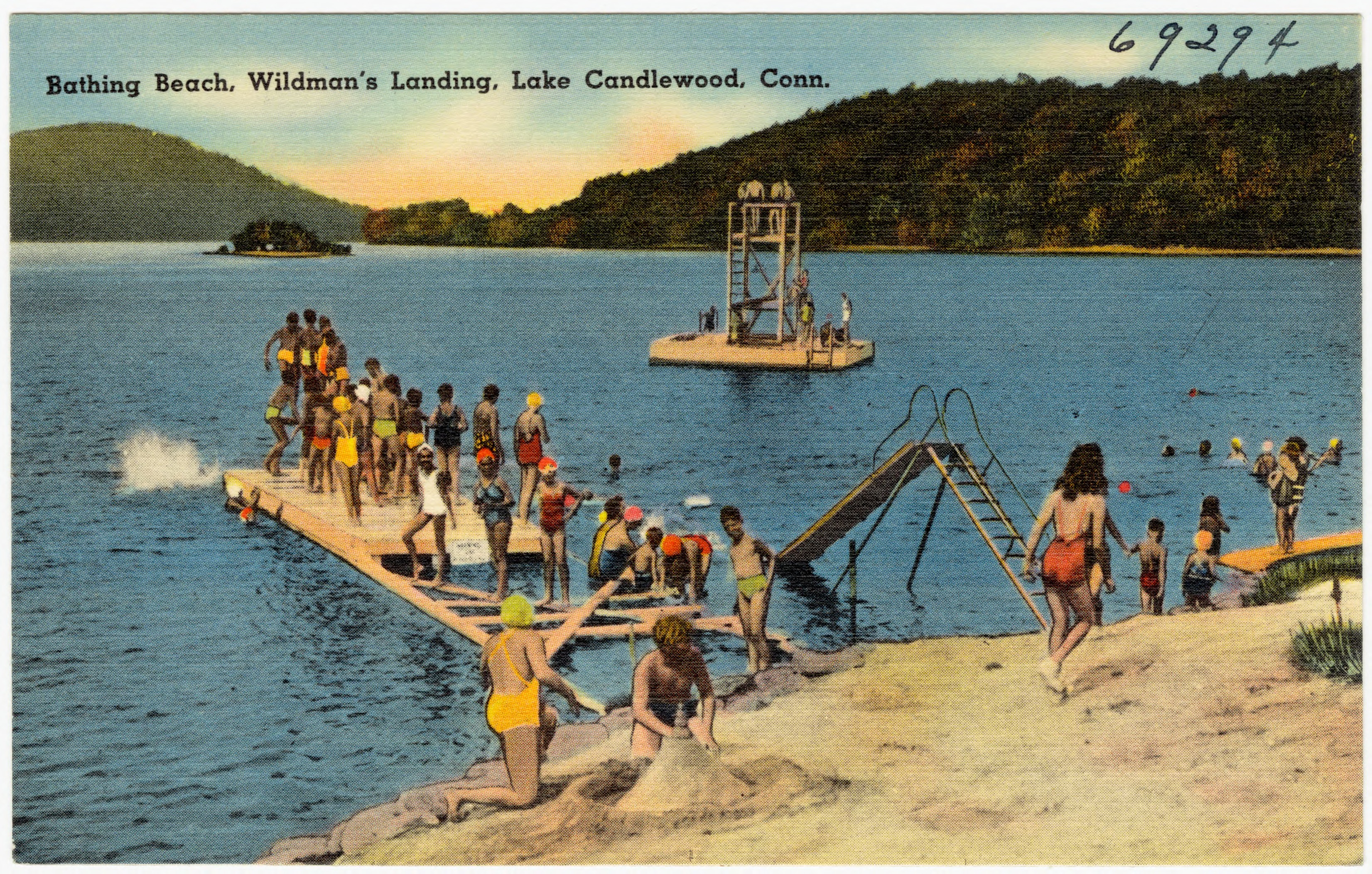
Postcard of Bathing Beach at Wildman's Landing

Wildman's Landing was a bathing beach and recreational area at the southern tip of Candlewood Lake's Lower Pine Cove, off Hayestown Road. It was named for William Wildman's farm, 76 acres (31 ha) of which were flooded to make way for the Lake. The remaining land would then be owned by Carl Albert, who was instrumental in the development of the former lake resort. However, in the early 1960s Albert began exploring real estate opportunities and sought to sell off portions of the property. Among the interested buyers was Anchor Marina Inc., which carried out plans to build out a 150-boat marina here. In 1963 Albert submitted a zoning petition to establish a trailer park in what was left of Wildman's Landing, which threatened existing plans to expand Danbury Town Park westward. Albert had previously offered to sell the land to the town however, his offer was considered too high and was rejected.

This contested section of Wildman's Landing eventually became two upscale condominium communities now known as Poet's Landing and Crystal Bay.

=== Danbury Slovak Union Sokol ===
Danbury's Slovak Gymnastic Union Sokol (Lodge #30), a social fitness club dedicated to the once prevalent Slovak population in the area, was originally located at the Lakeview picnic grounds in Hayestown. The lodge included a duckpin bowling alley called Sokol Lanes, which is still in operation today as Danbury Duckpin Bowling Lanes. In 1980 the City of Danbury purchased the 32-acre (13 ha) property from the club for recreational use and it is now known as Hatters Park. Lodge 30 relocated to a different Candlewood Lake property in Brookfield, Connecticut where it remains active today.

== Geography ==
In addition to Candlewood Lake, there are several ponds in the area: Doyles Pond, Kellners Pond, and Smiths Pond. The Padanaram Brook also runs along the northwestern section of Hayestown, thus leading this portion to often be referred to as Padanaram.

=== Communities ===
- Candleview Ridge
- Cornell Hills
- Hayestown Heights
- Jeanette Heights
- Poet's Landing / Crystal Bay
- Shoreview Estates

== Education ==
There are two public schools in the Hayestown area, Henry Abbott Technical High School, constructed in 1953 and Hayestown Elementary School, completed in 1956.

== Parks and recreation ==
- Emily Wellstood Preserve
- Danbury Police Athletic League (PAL) Center
- Danbury Town Park
- Hatters Park
