= List of mountains and summits in Fairfield County, Connecticut =

This is a list of mountains and summits in Fairfield County, Connecticut.

== List ==
The highest points in Fairfield County, Connecticut
Summit	Elevation	Coordinates	Municipality	Comment
Academy Hill Summit	23 feet (7.0 m)	41.172042°N 73.127054°W	Stratford	northeast of Sikorsky Memorial Airport, approximately 1 mile (1.6 km) south of Academy Hill Park (the Summit is not in the park)
Bagburn Hill Summit	610 feet (190 m)	41.360652°N 73.194835°W	Botsford	town of Newtown
Bald Hill Summit	604 feet (184 m)	41.213985°N 73.477623°W	Wilton	
Bald Mountain Summit	23 feet (7.0 m)	41.132597°N 73.361784°W	Saugatuck	town of Westport
Barnabas Hill Summit	656 feet (200 m)	41.421206°N 73.342896°W	Hawleyville	town of Newtown
Barlow Mountain Summit	837 feet (255 m)	41.315928°N 73.495679°W	Ridgefield	
Bear Mountain Summit	856 feet (261 m)	41.449261°N 73.456789°W	New Fairfield	
Beaver Bog Mountain Summit	1,175 feet (358 m)	41.498427°N 73.516513°W	New Fairfield	
Beaver Brook Mountain Summit	587 feet (179 m)	41.432039°N 73.417343°W	Brookfield	
Belden Hill Summit	344 feet (105 m)	41.171207°N 73.438732°W	Wilton	
Benjamin Hill Summit	148 feet (45 m)	41.133152°N 73.341784°W	Saugatuck	
Biddle Hill Summit	732 feet (223 m)	41.269818°N 73.473734°W	Georgetown	
Bogus Hill Summit	541 feet (165 m)	41.50815°N 73.463456°W	New Fairfield	
Bogus Mountain Summit	837 feet (255 m)	41.349262°N 73.426788°W	Bethel	
Booth Hill Summit	525 feet (160 m)	41.279263°N 73.185113°W	Trumbull	
Branchville Hill Summit	738 feet (225 m)	41.265373°N 73.465956°W	Georgetown	
Briggs Hill Summit	1,060 feet (320 m)	41.554816°N 73.494291°W	Sherman	
Bugg Hill Summit	620 feet (190 m)	41.324263°N 73.219281°W	Stepney	town of Monroe
Cains Hill Summit	699 feet (213 m)	41.295929°N 73.465956°W	Ridgefield	
Camfield Hill Summit	404 feet (123 m)	41.215929°N 73.359841°W	Weston	
Canoe Hill Summit	459 feet (140 m)	41.165652°N 73.4804°W	New Canaan	
Catamount Hill Summit	308 feet (94 m)	41.186207°N 73.324006°W	Weston	
Cedar Hill Summit	607 feet (185 m)	41.386207°N 73.299284°W	Newtown	
Cedar Mountain Summit	617 feet (188 m)	41.275651°N 73.446789°W	Georgetown	
Charcoal Hill Summit	207 feet (63 m)	41.177596°N 73.340951°W	Saugatuck	
Chestnut Hill Summit	338 feet (103 m)	41.183707°N 73.395675°W	Wilton	
Christie Hill Summit	213 feet (65 m)	41.085652°N 73.505678°W	Springdale	
Church Hill Summit	331 feet (101 m)	41.148707°N 73.495122°W	New Canaan	
Clapboard Hill Summit	141 feet (43 m)	41.125097°N 73.322616°W	Greens Farms	
Compo Hill Summit	112 feet (34 m)	41.113986°N 73.349839°W	Saugatuck	
Comstock Hill Summit	259 feet (79 m)	41.147318°N 73.453454°W	Norwalk	
Comstock Knoll Summit	538 feet (164 m)	41.206207°N 73.461789°W	Wilton	
Coolfish Hill Summit	699 feet (213 m)	41.366762°N 73.365675°W	Bethel	
Coram Hill Summit	427 feet (130 m)	41.297597°N 73.083997°W	Huntington	
Davis Hill Summit	463 feet (141 m)	41.240651°N 73.351785°W	Weston	
Deer Hill Summit	482 feet (147 m)	41.387317°N 73.450956°W	Danbury	
Diamond Hill Summit	614 feet (187 m)	41.287596°N 73.403454°W	West Redding	
Eden Hill Summit	787 feet (240 m)	41.332873°N 73.314284°W	Redding Ridge	
Fanton Hill Summit	289 feet (88 m)	41.205096°N 73.340673°W	Weston	
Ferris Hill Summit	394 feet (120 m)	41.172318°N 73.482622°W	New Canaan	
Fire Hill Summit	689 feet (210 m)	41.313429°N 73.460678°W	Ridgefield	
Flat Rock Hill Summit	358 feet (109 m)	41.222596°N 73.33734°W	Weston	
Flirt Hill Summit	486 feet (148 m)	41.253985°N 73.327618°W	Easton	
Florida Hill Summit	614 feet (187 m)	41.282873°N 73.459289°W	Georgetown	
Gilbert Hill Summit	614 feet (187 m)	41.263429°N 73.419566°W	Georgetown	
Golden Hill Summit	148 feet (45 m)	41.101763°N 73.427342°W	South Norwalk	
Goodsell Hill Summit	692 feet (211 m)	41.265929°N 73.414843°W	Georgetown	
Great Hill Summit	712 feet (217 m)	41.40204°N 73.347063°W	Newtown	
Grumman Hill Summit	262 feet (80 m)	41.164263°N 73.409009°W	Norwalk	
High Rock Hill Summit	614 feet (187 m)	41.379263°N 73.239282°W	Botsford	town of Newtown
Hirams Hill Summit	548 feet (167 m)	41.297596°N 73.262338°W	Stepney	town of Monroe
Honey Hill Summit	469 feet (143 m)	41.242318°N 73.426788°W	Georgetown	
Hoyden Hill Summit	440 feet (130 m)	41.223707°N 73.280116°W	Easton	
Hubbell Hill Summit	922 feet (281 m)	41.56815°N 73.475401°W	Sherman	
Huckleberry Hill Summit	673 feet (205 m)	41.273984°N 73.405121°W	West Redding	
Huckleberry Hills Summit	463 feet (141 m)	41.190374°N 73.476233°W	Wilton	
Indian Hill Summit	197 feet (60 m)	41.146485°N 73.434009°W	Norwalk	
Isinglass Hill Summit	364 feet (111 m)	41.278985°N 73.146777°W	Huntington	
Israel Hill Summit	630 feet (190 m)	41.328707°N 73.18039°W	Monroe Center	town of Monroe
Ivy Hill Summit	768 feet (234 m)	41.283984°N 73.470956°W	Ridgefield	
Lambert Hill Summit	335 feet (102 m)	41.173152°N 73.467066°W	New Canaan	
Long Hill Summit	407 feet (124 m)	41.28343°N 73.095109°W	Huntington	
Lower Belden Hill Summit	269 feet (82 m)	41.152319°N 73.437065°W	Norwalk	
Lower White Hills Summit	472 feet (144 m)	41.324541°N 73.156778°W	Huntington	
Lowther Point Cliff	10 feet (3.0 m)	41.016764°N 73.595403°W	Riverside	
Meekers Hill Summit	666 feet (203 m)	41.309818°N 73.342341°W	Redding Ridge	
Meetinghouse Hill Summit	56 feet (17 m)	41.183152°N 73.206224°W	Bridgeport	
Merwins Hill Summit	203 feet (62 m)	41.172041°N 73.306783°W	Fairfield	
Middle Clapboard Hill Summit	279 feet (85 m)	41.127319°N 73.458454°W	Norwalk	
Middle Mountain Summit	791 feet (241 m)	41.367595°N 73.449567°W	Danbury	
Mill Hill Summit	167 feet (51 m)	41.154541°N 73.27956°W	Southport	
Mischa Hill Summit	331 feet (101 m)	41.257319°N 73.171779°W	Trumbull	
Moose Hill Summit	650 feet (200 m)	41.332596°N 73.206225°W	Monroe Center	town of Monroe
Moses Mountain Summit	968 feet (295 m)	41.360095°N 73.465678°W	Danbury	
Mount Pleasant Summit	755 feet (230 m)	41.412595°N 73.322896°W	Newtown	
Mountain End Summit	659 feet (201 m)	41.376484°N 73.448733°W	Danbury	
Ned Mountain Summit	932 feet (284 m)	41.34815°N 73.519569°W	Ridgefield	
Nod Hill Summit	646 feet (197 m)	41.260651°N 73.455956°W	Georgetown	
Nod Hill Summit	653 feet (199 m)	41.260651°N 73.456789°W	Georgetown	
Orchard Hill Summit	184 feet (56 m)	41.167041°N 73.259282°W	Fairfield	
Osborn Hill Summit	676 feet (206 m)	41.398429°N 73.214281°W	Stevenson	
Osborne Hill Summit	167 feet (51 m)	41.164819°N 73.25567°W	Fairfield	
Palmer Hill Summit	203 feet (62 m)	41.064264°N 73.567624°W	Cos Cob	
Pavement Hill Summit	394 feet (120 m)	41.194541°N 73.286783°W	Fairfield	
Picketts Ridge Summit	725 feet (221 m)	41.325095°N 73.4529°W	Ridgefield	
Pine Hill Summit	394 feet (120 m)	41.180652°N 73.476789°W	New Canaan	
Pine Mountain Summit	997 feet (304 m)	41.351206°N 73.487623°W	Danbury	
Pond Mountain Summit	1,194 feet (364 m)	41.510372°N 73.489568°W	New Fairfield	
Pop Mountain Summit	351 feet (107 m)	41.247874°N 73.345119°W	Weston	
Powells Hill Summit	522 feet (159 m)	41.236207°N 73.33234°W	Weston	
Prospect Hill Summit	646 feet (197 m)	41.340929°N 73.382342°W	Redding Center	
Redding Ridge Summit	702 feet (214 m)	41.31704°N 73.353452°W	Redding Ridge	
Rock Raymond Summit	341 feet (104 m)	41.290929°N 73.274283°W	Easton	
Round Hill Summit	564 feet (172 m)	41.103707°N 73.673462°W	Glenville	town of Greenwich
Round Mountain Summit	620 feet (190 m)	41.323428°N 73.512902°W	Ridgefield	
Sasco Hill Summit	85 feet (26 m)	41.128986°N 73.271781°W	Southport	town of Fairfield
Sasqua Hill Summit	82 feet (25 m)	41.104819°N 73.391507°W	East Norwalk	
Second Hill Summit	190 feet (58 m)	41.219819°N 73.152333°W	Stratford	
Seth Low Mountain Summit	928 feet (283 m)	41.329444°N 73.513611°W	Ridgefield	
Shelter Rock Summit	636 feet (194 m)	41.394817°N 73.422899°W	Bethel	
Silvermine Hill Summit	266 feet (81 m)	41.156763°N 73.467344°W	New Canaan	
Sipperly Hill Summit	144 feet (44 m)	41.168985°N 73.363452°W	Saugatuck	
Sport Hill Summit	505 feet (154 m)	41.241485°N 73.268172°W	Easton	
Spring Hill Summit	187 feet (57 m)	41.114263°N 73.424286°W	Norwalk	
Spruce Mountain Summit	896 feet (273 m)	41.357595°N 73.475401°W	Danbury	
Staples Hill Summit	472 feet (144 m)	41.236207°N 73.297895°W	Easton	
Stony Hill Summit	505 feet (154 m)	41.422595°N 73.407065°W	Bethel	
Success Hill Summit	46 feet (14 m)	41.19343°N 73.154833°W	Stratford	
Sugar Hill Summit	699 feet (213 m)	41.402318°N 73.325396°W	Newtown	
Sugar Loaf Hill Summit	272 feet (83 m)	41.222596°N 73.429565°W	Wilton	
Sugarloaf Summit	449 feet (137 m)	41.400096°N 73.250949°W	Sandy Hook	
Sunset Hill Summit	312 feet (95 m)	41.250096°N 73.43151°W	Georgetown	
Sunset Hill Summit	830 feet (250 m)	41.340366°N 73.36328°W	Redding	
Sweet Cake Mountain Summit	869 feet (265 m)	41.470928°N 73.464845°W	New Fairfield	
Talmadge Hill Summit	335 feet (102 m)	41.121763°N 73.490122°W	New Canaan	
Tashua Hill Summit	587 feet (179 m)	41.260374°N 73.249838°W	Trumbull	
Taunton Hill Summit	823 feet (251 m)	41.396484°N 73.350397°W	Newtown	
Tenmile Hill Summit	991 feet (302 m)	41.660094°N 73.515125°W	Sherman	north of Connecticut Route 55, east of the Appalachian Trail, not far from Gaylordsville in Litchfield County
Thomas Mountain Summit	935 feet (285 m)	41.366206°N 73.457067°W	Danbury	
Titicus Mountain Summit	1,027 feet (313 m)	41.448705°N 73.510124°W	New Fairfield	
Topstone Mountain Summit	673 feet (205 m)	41.298707°N 73.443455°W	West Redding	
Town Hill Summit	427 feet (130 m)	41.382039°N 73.435677°W	Danbury	
Town Mountain Summit	869 feet (265 m)	41.371762°N 73.442622°W	Danbury	
Towner Hill Summit	899 feet (274 m)	41.585372°N 73.475957°W	Sherman	
Tunxis Hill Summit	161 feet (49 m)	41.176763°N 73.237336°W	Fairfield	
Turkey Hill Summit	154 feet (47 m)	41.133152°N 73.318727°W	Greens Farms	
Turner Mountain Summit	1,188 feet (362 m)	41.583705°N 73.519014°W	Sherman	
Umpawaug Hill Summit	643 feet (196 m)	41.305929°N 73.424566°W	West Redding	
Upper Bald Hill Summit	561 feet (171 m)	41.229262°N 73.479289°W	Wilton	
Walnut Tree Hill Summit	561 feet (171 m)	41.306485°N 73.169556°W	Huntington	
Wanzer Mountain Summit	1,135 feet (346 m)	41.530094°N 73.494846°W	Sherman	
Webbs Hill Summit	331 feet (101 m)	41.115374°N 73.569569°W	Ridgeway	city of Stamford, east of Long Ridge Rd., north of Merritt.
West Mountain Summit	935 feet (285 m)	41.304262°N 73.526513°W	Ridgefield	
Windy Hill Summit	725 feet (221 m)	41.288151°N 73.423732°W	West Redding	
Wooster Mountain Summit	906 feet (276 m)	41.347873°N 73.47679°W	Danbury	
Wren Knolls Summit	371 feet (113 m)	41.168707°N 73.558181°W	New Canaan	
Zion Hill Summit	269 feet (82 m)	41.222596°N 73.42651°W	Wilton	
