= Fairfield County Sheriff's Department (Connecticut) =

Law enforcement agency in Connecticut

Fairfield County, CT Sheriff's Department patch

The Fairfield County Sheriff's Department was a law enforcement agency in Fairfield County, Connecticut, established under the original Constitution of the State of Connecticut. Initially, the Department of Administrative Services was responsible for administering the testing process for special deputy sheriffs However, in December 2000, legislators replaced the sheriffs with the State Marshal Commission under the Department of Administrative Services. The State Marshal Commission was created by Public Act 00–99, in 2000. On November 29, 2000, a constitutional amendment repealed the portion regarding sheriffs. Presently, the 2009 version of the State of Connecticut Constitution does not make a reference to Marshals, and continues to list sheriffs as this role.

== Roles and Responsibilities ==
Their primary duties included; providing security for court houses, carrying out arrest warrants, and transporting prisoners. Unlike Sheriffs in other states, Fairfield County Sheriffs did not act as the primary law enforcement or patrol agencies for areas of the county not served by municipal police departments. However, the department did have law enforcement powers until the modernization of local police. In each of the 8 counties, a high sheriff was elected.

A majority vote eliminated the position of High Sheriff (one month later all deputy sheriffs in the state were transferred to the position of State Judicial Marshals under the local county branch) in Connecticut counties after the topic was brought up by then Connecticut state attorney general Richard Blumenthal.

== State Marshal Commission ==
The Commission split the Fairfield County Sheriffs Department into three judicial districts (Fairfield, Stamford-Norwalk, and Danbury), each with its own Chief Judicial Marshal. The State Marshal Commission operates within the Department of Administrative Services with independent decision-making authority.

== Controversies ==
=== Edwin S. Mak ===
In 1993, Edwin S. Mak, Fairfield County High Sheriff, was investigated for misconduct. In 1994, Alfred J. Rioux was also accused of using his position to require lower ranking sheriffs to pay dues and make campaign contributions.

=== Attorney General Blumenthal ===
As a result of Attorney General Richard Blumenthal's probe into the State of Connecticut's Sheriff Departments, they were disbanded. It was determined that several of the departments were over-billing the State.

=== Governor Rowland ===
In 1999, Governor John G. Rowland called to abolish the sheriff system in Connecticut.

== See also ==
- List of law enforcement agencies in Connecticut
