= Spring Hill (Norwalk) =

Coordinates: 41.1165°N 73.4255°W

- Neighborhood
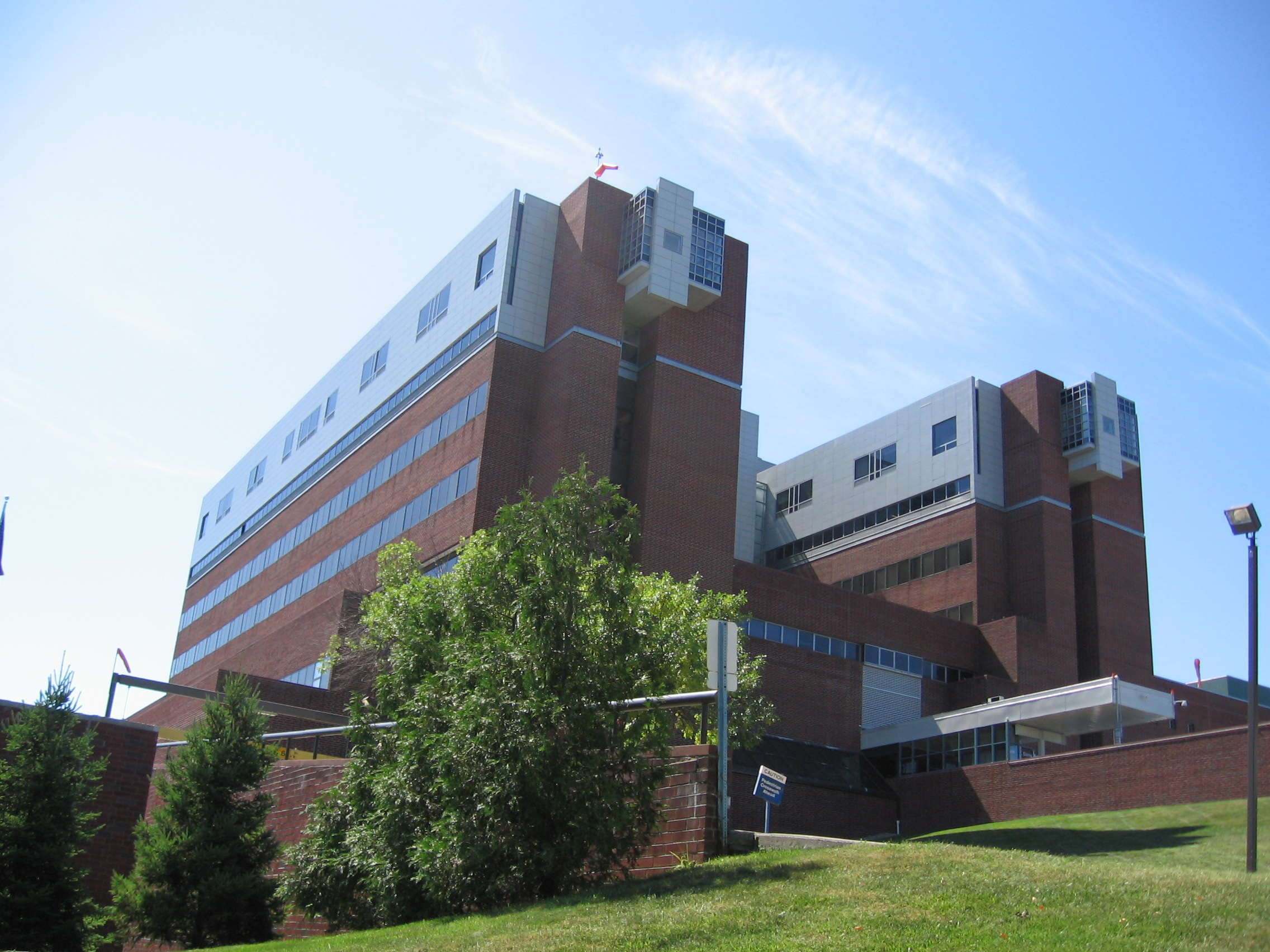
- Norwalk Hospital, the most prominent landmark in the neighborhood
- Interactive map of Spring Hill
- Country: United States
- State: Connecticut
- County: Fairfield
- City: Norwalk
- Time zone: UTC-5:00 (Eastern)
  - Summer (DST): UTC-4:00 (Eastern)
- Area code: 203

Spring Hill is a section of Norwalk, Connecticut named after the hill on which most of the neighborhood sits. The neighborhood is located west of the Central section of Norwalk, across to (Route 7) and north of (Interstate 95) and (Route 1). Norwalk Hospital is on the eastern edge of the neighborhood. Riverside Cemetery is on the northeastern edge.

About 9,000 people live in Spring Hill, a densely populated part of the city where condominiums have been built in recent decades. The Spring Hill Neighborhood Association is an advocacy group for the community.

In 2008, the parks committee of the First Taxing District of Norwalk agreed to create a park out of a 0.75-acre (3,000 m^{2}) tract surrounding the water towers in the neighborhood (bordered by Dover Street, Grandview Avenue and Magnolia Street). The property includes several oak trees that are about 150 years old. Up until the creation of the park, the neighborhood was the only one in Norwalk without a park. Riverside Park, a 1-mile (1.6 km) long strip, previously existed where the "Super 7" highway connector was built in the early 1980s.

Norwalk Hospital is a major landowner in the neighborhood. Aside from the land where the hospital buildings are located, the hospital owns more than a dozen parcels totaling roughly 6 acres (2.4 ha) on Truman, Stevens and Maple streets, Magnolia Avenue and Rhodonolia. The parcels contain houses, condominiums and medical facilities.

Jefferson Science Magnet School is located in Spring Hill.
