= Route 7 Gateway, Connecticut =

Census-designated place in Connecticut, United States

Route 7 Gateway
- Census-designated place
- Location within Connecticut Location within the United States
- Coordinates: 41°18′55″N 73°28′26″W
- Country: United States
- State: Connecticut
- County: Fairfield
- Town: Ridgefield

Area
  - Total: 0.71 sq mi (1.85 km^{2})
  - Land: 0.68 sq mi (1.76 km^{2})
  - Water: 0.039 sq mi (0.10 km^{2})
- Elevation: 495 ft (151 m)
- Time zone: UTC-5 (Eastern (EST))
  - Summer (DST): UTC-4 (EDT)
- ZIP Code: 06877 (Ridgefield)
- Area codes: 203/475
- FIPS code: 09-65685
- GNIS feature ID: 2805963

Route 7 Gateway is a census-designated place (CDP) in the town of Ridgefield, Connecticut, United States. It is on the east side of Ridgefield, bordered to the east by the town of Redding and to the northeast by the city of Danbury. U.S. Route 7 runs through the center of the CDP, leading north into Danbury and south to Norwalk. Connecticut Route 35 splits off Route 7 to the southwest in the center of the CDP, leading to the center of Ridgefield.

Route 7 Gateway was first listed as a CDP prior to the 2020 census.
