= West Mountain, Connecticut =

Census-designated place in Connecticut, United States

- Census-designated place
- Location within Connecticut Location within the United States
- Coordinates: 41°17′57″N 73°32′9″W
- Country: United States
- State: Connecticut
- County: Fairfield
- Town: Ridgefield

Area
  - Total: 2.18 sq mi (5.65 km^{2})
  - Land: 2.13 sq mi (5.51 km^{2})
  - Water: 0.054 sq mi (0.14 km^{2})
- Elevation: 810 ft (250 m)
- Time zone: UTC-5 (Eastern (EST))
  - Summer (DST): UTC-4 (EDT)
- ZIP Code: 06877 (Ridgefield)
- Area codes: 203/475
- FIPS code: 09-83045
- GNIS feature ID: 2805973

West Mountain is a census-designated place (CDP) in the town of Ridgefield, Connecticut, United States. As of the 2020 census, West Mountain had a population of 603. It is on the west side of Ridgefield and is bordered to the west by the towns of North Salem and Lewisboro in Westchester County, New York. The West Mountain Historic District occupies 425 acres (172 ha) at the center of the CDP, and newer residences occupy portions of the remainder of the CDP.

West Mountain was first listed as a CDP prior to the 2020 census.
