= Little Danbury, Connecticut =

Little Danbury
- Location within the state of Connecticut Little Danbury (the United States)
- Coordinates: 41°07′39″N 73°14′50″W
- Country: United States
- U.S. state: Connecticut
- County: Fairfield
- Town: Fairfield
- Elevation: 3 ft (0.91 m)
- Time zone: UTC-5 (Eastern)
  - Summer (DST): UTC-4 (Eastern)
- GNIS feature ID: 1942407

Little Danbury was a beachfront settlement on Long Island Sound in what is today southeast Fairfield.

== History ==
The Fairfield area had no permanent beachfront living structures prior to the late 1800s. Shacks would be erected at the start of the vacation season and then dismantled and stored for the winter. In the late 1890s, "rustic" inexpensive permanent cottages were built in a settlement called "Little Danbury".

The cottages were popular with "average folks who traveled down from Danbury", while wealthy vacationers—who arrived daily by train from New York—did not consider beachfront cottages fashionable and instead stayed at the inland Fairfield House resort.

Reef Road was built to reach Little Danbury, and soon after, a cluster of inexpensive cottages known as "Little Bridgeport" was established at nearby Pine Creek.

Many of the properties at Little Danbury were destroyed in the 1938 New England hurricane.
