= Little Italy (Bridgeport) =

Neighborhood in Bridgeport, Connecticut

Coordinates: 41.19°N 73.20°W

Little Italy / Central End
- Neighborhood in Bridgeport, Connecticut
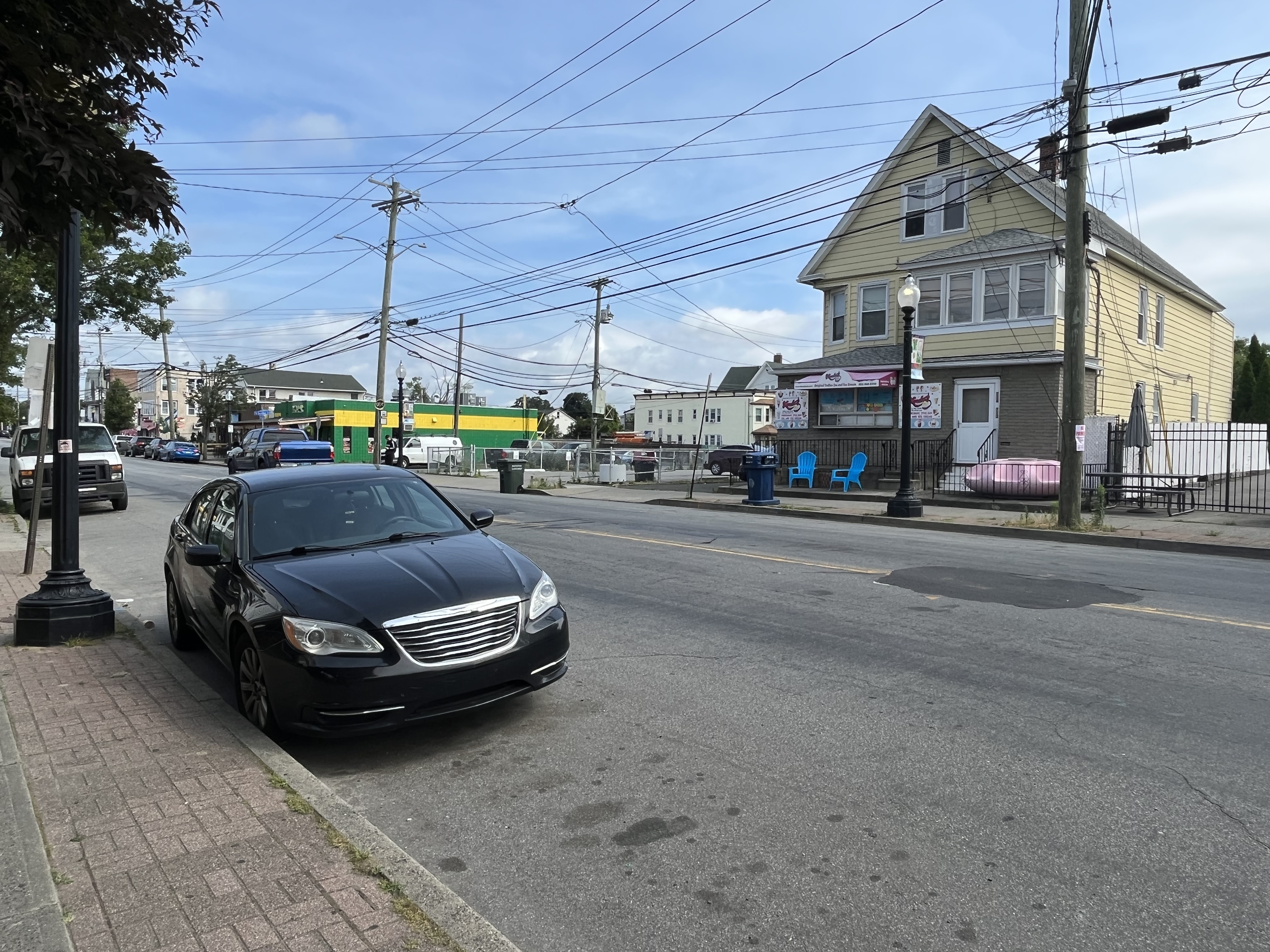
- Nickname: Little Italy
- Interactive map of Little Italy / Central End

Little Italy is a neighborhood located in the North End of Bridgeport, Connecticut on Madison Avenue, near the Fairfield County Correctional Facility and Central High School, with a high Italian-American population.

== History ==
During the late 19th and early 20th centuries, many European immigrants moved to Bridgeport to work in the city's many large-scale industrial facilities. Many Italian arrivals during this time clustered together in the city's Central End and North End, particularly around Madison Avenue.

== Present day ==
The area around Madison Avenue is still referred to as "Little Italy", and remains home to many Italian restaurants. However, in recent years, many of the neighborhood's Italian restaurants have moved to surrounding towns following the de-industrialization of Bridgeport. The area now also has a significant Portuguese population.

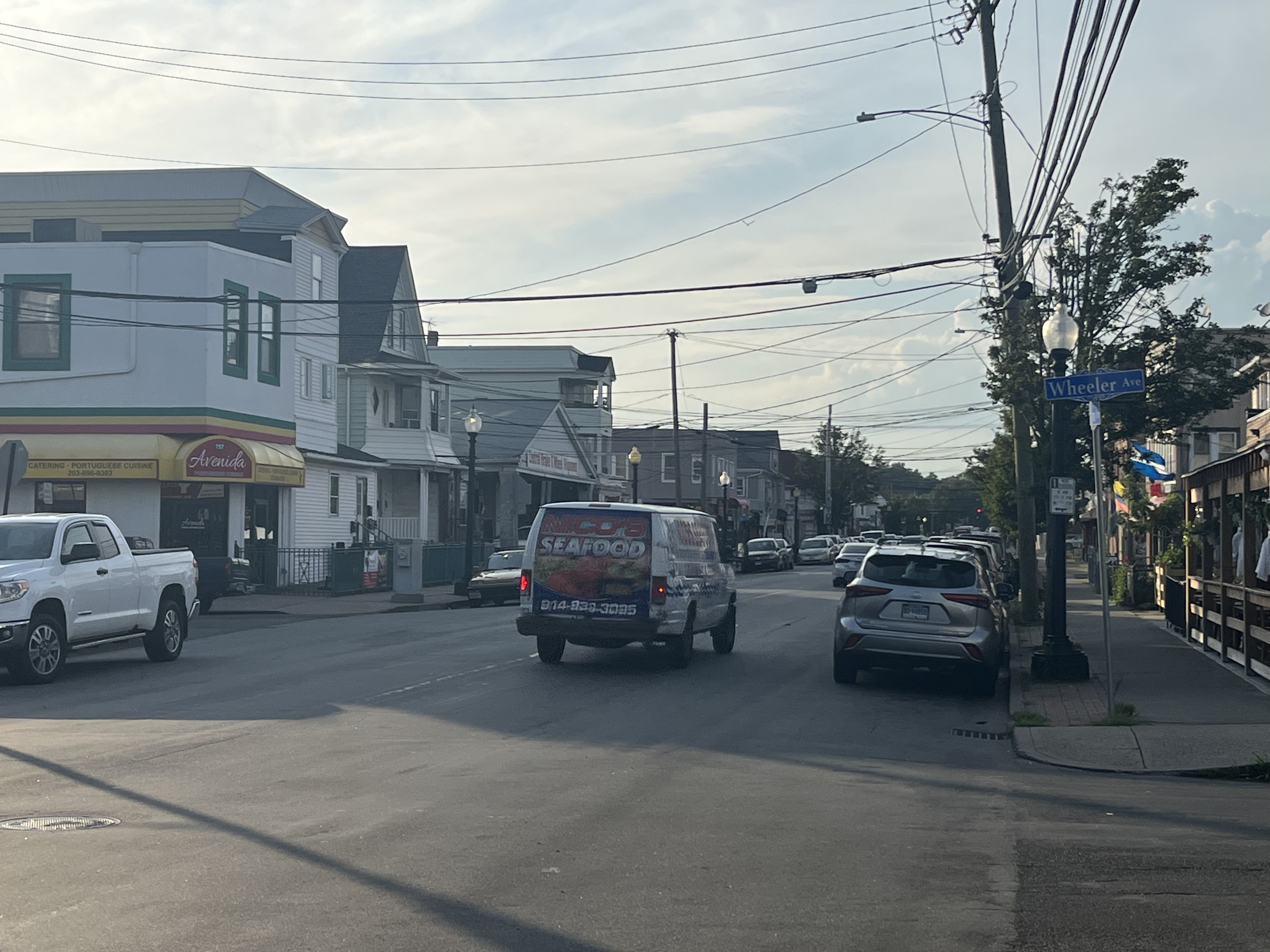
Madison Avenue, Bridgeport’s Little Italy (now mostly Luso-American)

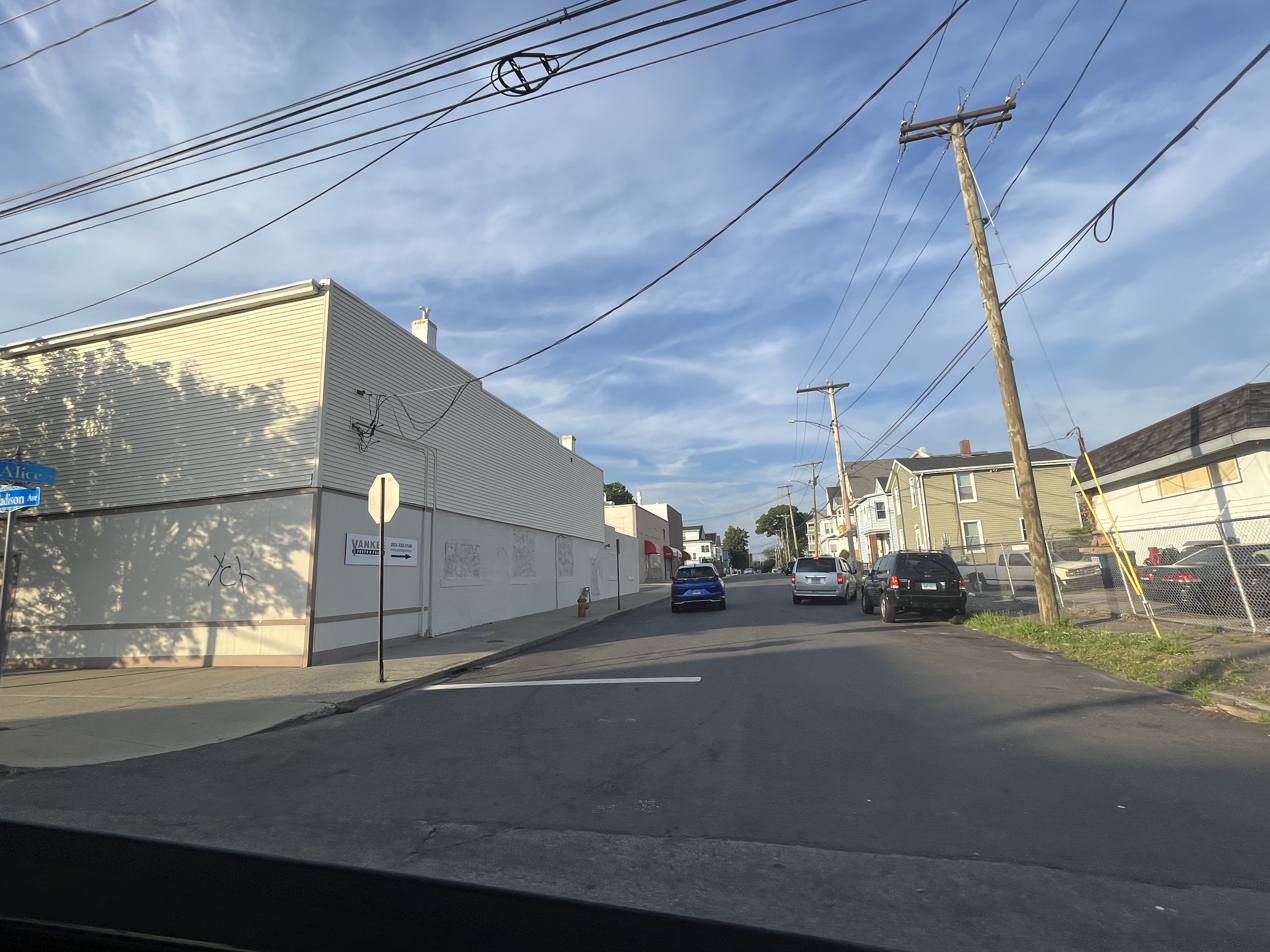
Madison Avenue in Bridgeport next to Italian Ice Shop

== See also ==
- History of Bridgeport, Connecticut
