= Lakes East, Connecticut =

Census-designated place in Connecticut, United States

- Census-designated place
- Location within Connecticut Location within the United States
- Coordinates: 41°20′2″N 73°29′30″W
- Country: United States
- State: Connecticut
- County: Fairfield
- Town: Ridgefield

Area
  - Total: 1.00 sq mi (2.60 km^{2})
  - Land: 0.91 sq mi (2.35 km^{2})
  - Water: 0.097 sq mi (0.25 km^{2})
- Elevation: 615 ft (187 m)
- Time zone: UTC-5 (Eastern (EST))
  - Summer (DST): UTC-4 (EDT)
- ZIP Code: 06877 (Ridgefield)
- Area codes: 203/475
- FIPS code: 09-41585
- GNIS feature ID: 2805951

Lakes East is a census-designated place (CDP) in the town of Ridgefield, Fairfield County, Connecticut, United States. It is in the northeastern part of the town and consists of neighborhoods situated around several small lakes, notably Wataba Lake in the north and Fox Hill Lake in the south.

Lakes East was first listed as a CDP prior to the 2020 census. As of the 2020 census, Lakes East had a population of 1,299.

== Demographics ==
=== 2020 census ===
As of the 2020 census, Lakes East had a population of 1,299. The median age was 43.9 years. 21.8% of residents were under the age of 18 and 17.6% of residents were 65 years of age or older. For every 100 females there were 96.8 males, and for every 100 females age 18 and over there were 95.0 males age 18 and over.

100.0% of residents lived in urban areas, while 0.0% lived in rural areas.

There were 488 households in Lakes East, of which 42.4% had children under the age of 18 living in them. Of all households, 61.7% were married-couple households, 12.3% were households with a male householder and no spouse or partner present, and 21.9% were households with a female householder and no spouse or partner present. About 19.3% of all households were made up of individuals and 12.5% had someone living alone who was 65 years of age or older.

There were 516 housing units, of which 5.4% were vacant. The homeowner vacancy rate was 2.0% and the rental vacancy rate was 4.4%.

Racial composition as of the 2020 census
Race	Number	Percent
White	1,088	83.8%
Black or African American	13	1.0%
American Indian and Alaska Native	2	0.2%
Asian	50	3.8%
Native Hawaiian and Other Pacific Islander	2	0.2%
Some other race	25	1.9%
Two or more races	119	9.2%
Hispanic or Latino (of any race)	80	6.2%
