= Germantown, Connecticut =

Neighborhood in Danbury, Connecticut, United States

Germantown
- Neighborhood
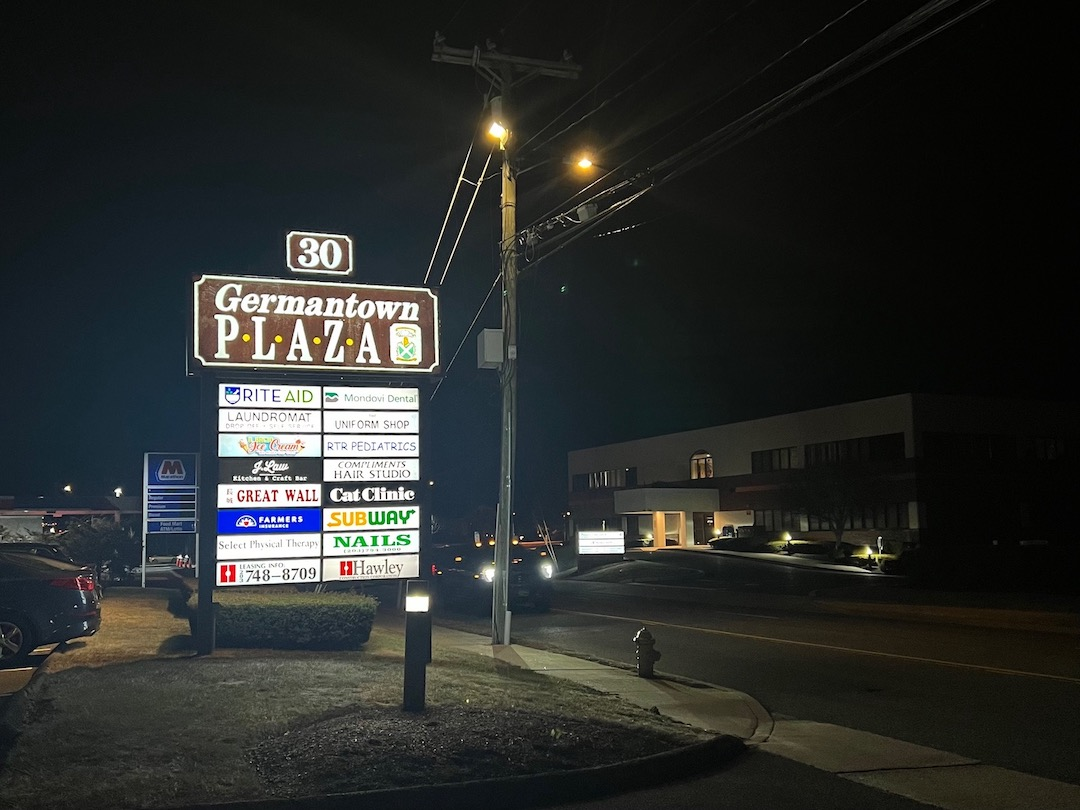
- Sign at Germantown Plaza

- Location in Connecticut Location in the United States
- Coordinates: 41°24′29″N 73°26′32″W
- Country: United States
- State: Connecticut
- County: Fairfield
- Region: Western CT
- City: Danbury

Germantown is a neighborhood in the city of Danbury, Fairfield County, Connecticut, United States. This section is on the eastern side of Danbury, with Hospital Avenue as its main thoroughfare. It is named after the German immigrants who lived there during the 19th century to work in Danbury's hat factories. The large German population in the area led to it being known as Germantown.

Due to the location of Danbury Hospital, the area has become a hub for different medical practices, particularly along Germantown Road. Hawley Construction, which is headquartered in Germantown, has played a key role in building these offices, along with other commercial development contributions within the neighborhood.

Broadview Middle School is located in Germantown.
