= Brookfield Center Historic District =

Brookfield Center Historic District may refer to:

- Brookfield Center Historic District (Brookfield, Connecticut), listed on the National Register of Historic Places in Connecticut
- Brookfield Center Historic District (Brookfield Center, Ohio), listed on the NRHP in Ohio
