= Brookfield station (Metro-North) =

Metro-North Railroad station in Connecticut

Brookfield
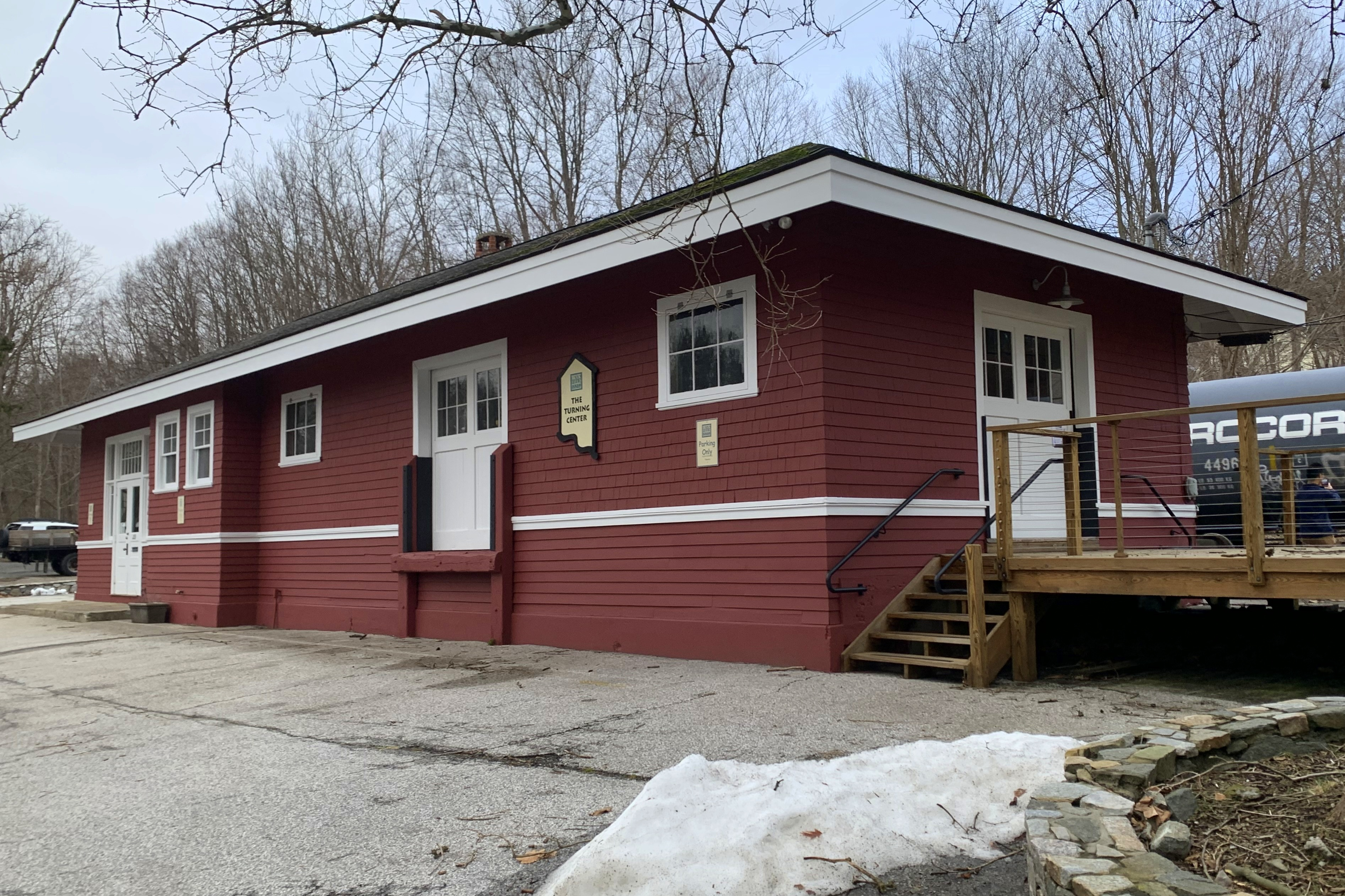
- The former station building in 2021

General information
- Owner: CTDOT
- Tracks: 1

Proposed services
Preceding station	Metro-North Railroad	Following station
North Danbury toward South Norwalk, Stamford or Grand Central	Danbury Branch	New Milford Terminus

Former services
Preceding station	New York, New Haven and Hartford Railroad	Following station
Danbury toward Norwalk and South Norwalk	Pittsfield Branch	New Milford toward Pittsfield
Location

Brookfield station is a proposed passenger rail station on the Danbury Branch of the Metro-North Railroad New Haven Line, to be located in Brookfield, Connecticut.

== History ==
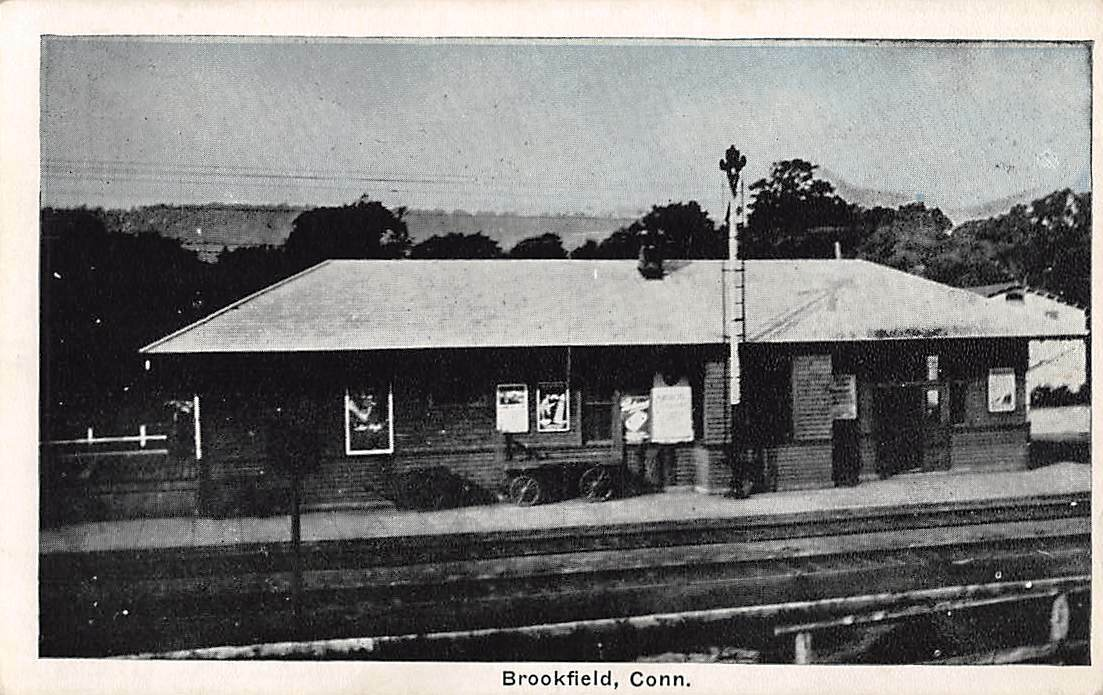
The station in the early 20th century

The Brookfield station first opened in 1840, and was built by Housatonic Railroad. The Brookfield station was located in the Iron works district of Brookfield, today known as "Four Corners" or the "Town Center District". The station was designed to be used for both passenger and freight service. On September 24, 1868, a second station had opened on Stony Hill Road that was known as "Brookfield Junction". Passenger service was operated by Penn Central until April 30, 1971.

Two possible locations have been determined for a Metro-North station in the future. One proposed location is on Pocono Road across from the Brookfield Municipal Center, and the other is on Whisconier Road on the property of the Brookfield Craft Center (which utilizes the old station building as an art gallery). Original plans for the station had surfaced in 2009–2010, when a study was conducted to determine the viability of the station. Three potential station sites were being considered, including restoration of the old station. The final project report, issued in 2016, concluded that the costs of electrification of the existing line or the extension to New Milford were too high to offset the small increase in ridership.

In September 2020, due to an increase in demand for expansion of commuter rail service to Greater Danbury, the United States Department of Transportation awarded a $400,000 grant to the Western Connecticut Council of Governments to study improvements along the Danbury Branch line and develop a plan for expanding service north and re-examine construction of a North Danbury, Brookfield and New Milford station.
