= Huckleberry Hill School =

Huckleberry Hill School may refer to:

- Huckleberry Hill School (Connecticut), located in Brookfield, Connecticut
- Huckleberry Hill School (Massachusetts), located in Lynnfield, Massachusetts
