= Brookfield Theatre for the Arts =

Theater in Connecticut, US

Coordinates: 41.4693469°N 73.3908915°W

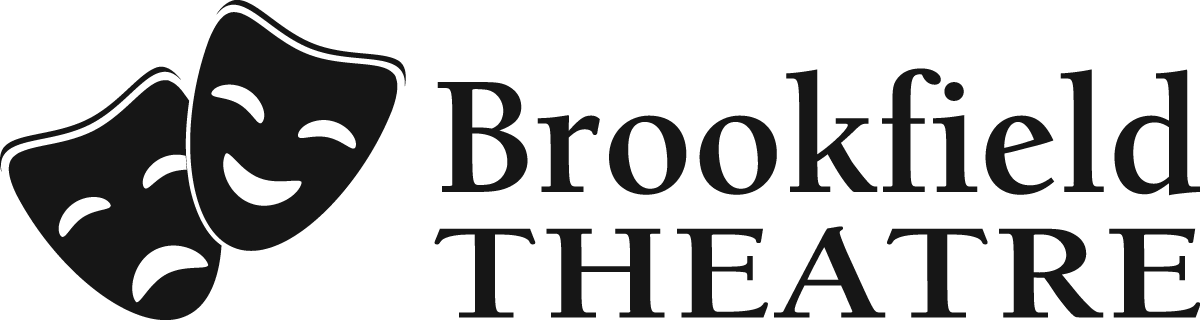
- Logo of the theatre
- Interactive map of Brookfield Theatre for the Arts
- Address: 184 Whisconier Road; Brookfield, Connecticut; United States
- Capacity: 135
- Type: Indoor theatre

Construction
- Opened: 1957
- Rebuilt: 1957, 2005
- Years active: 1957-present

Website
- http://www.brookfieldtheatre.org/

The Brookfield Theatre for the Arts is a theater located in the historic Curtis School for Boys gymnasium building in Brookfield, Connecticut, located within the Brookfield Center Historic District. The theater has a capacity of 135 people and hosts a variety of entertainment events such as films, plays, and musical performances.

Every year five community productions are chosen including comedies, dramas, musicals, and classics. Additional workshops and special events are added throughout the year, such as the Brookfield Film Festival which is held by the Brookfield Arts Commission. The festival lasts three days, and screens short and foreign films.

== History ==
The contemporary company was established in 1957 as the "Country Players of Brookfield." The name appears to reference the Brookfield Players, an acting company founded in Brookfield in the 1930s by Virgil Geddes.

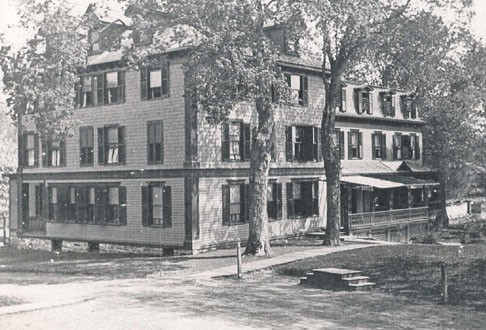
The Curtis School for Boys, as seen in 1883

=== Curtis School for Boys ===
In 1883, the Curtis School for Boys opened in Brookfield, Connecticut, after relocating from the town of Bethlehem, Connecticut.

The school was founded by Frederick Smiley Curtis, a mentor and educator who was also the last surviving member of the Yale University Class of 1869. Curtis was born February 18, 1850, in Stratford, Connecticut and earned the PhD at Yale University. He taught at West Chester University (Then known as Westchester Norman School), and then at Swarthmore College before founding the Curtis School.

The school campus had seven buildings, including the rustic style stone-and-wooden beam gymnasium built in 1907. The school's property also consisted of main classrooms, a chapel, a barn and cottage. The Curtis School closed its doors in 1943.

=== Historic building ===
The Theatre is housed in the former Curtis School gymnasium, a building that was standing empty until it was purchased by the Brookfield Country Players in 1957 and remodeled as a community theater. A dressing room was added in the 1960s and, in the 1980s, a backstage space was constructed.

The building, in rustic style, originally featured a massive stone fireplace at each end of the gymnasium. While one fireplace has been walled over behind what is now the stage, the other remains "a beautiful piece of functional architecture".

== Theatre ==
The theater organization grew to include various cultural offerings. In 2003 the name was changed to "The Brookfield Theatre for the Arts, Inc." (Brookfield Theatre) to show it is intended to be a center for creativity for the greater Brookfield region. The new lobby, dedicated in 2005, has been used for informal gatherings, workshops, cultural events, and art shows. As part of the 60th anniversary celebration, the lobby was remodeled and rededicated as an art gallery with a board member acting as curator for fine art shows throughout the year.
