= Candlewood Shores, Connecticut =

Census-designated place in Connecticut, United States

- Census-designated place
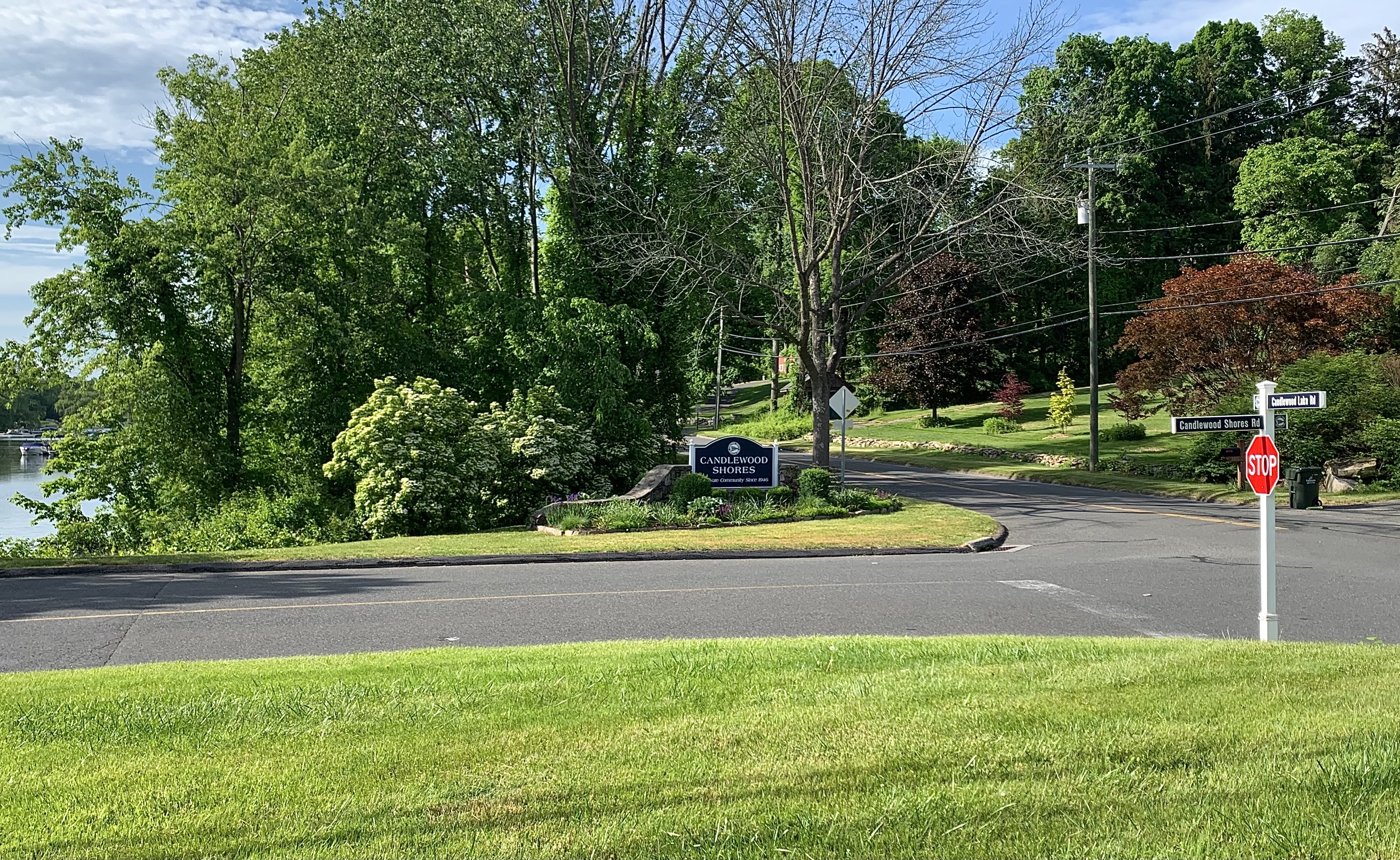
- Main Entrance to Candlewood Shores

- Seal

- Location within the Western Connecticut Planning Region and the state of Connecticut

- Location within Connecticut Location within the United States
- Coordinates: 41°28′51″N 73°26′22″W
- Country: United States
- State: Connecticut
- Counties: Fairfield
- Region: Western CT
- Town: Brookfield

Area
  - Total: 0.29 sq mi (0.76 km^{2})
  - Land: 0.23 sq mi (0.60 km^{2})
  - Water: 0.062 sq mi (0.16 km^{2})
- Elevation: 520 ft (160 m)
- Time zone: UTC-5 (Eastern (EST))
  - Summer (DST): UTC-4 (EDT)
- ZIP Code: 06804 (Brookfield)
- Area codes: 203/475
- FIPS code: 09-11780
- GNIS feature ID: 2805939
- Website: candlewoodshores.com

Candlewood Shores is a private residential community and census-designated place (CDP) in the town of Brookfield, Fairfield County, Connecticut, United States. It is in the northwestern part of the town, on the east shore of Candlewood Lake. It is bordered to the south by Candlewood Orchrads, to the north by Candlewood Lake Club, and to the west by the town of New Fairfield.

Candlewood Shores was first listed as a CDP prior to the 2020 census. As of the 2020 census, Candlewood Shores had a population of 665.
