= Brookfield Center Historic District (Brookfield, Connecticut) =

Historic district in Connecticut, United States

- U.S. National Register of Historic Places
- U.S. Historic district
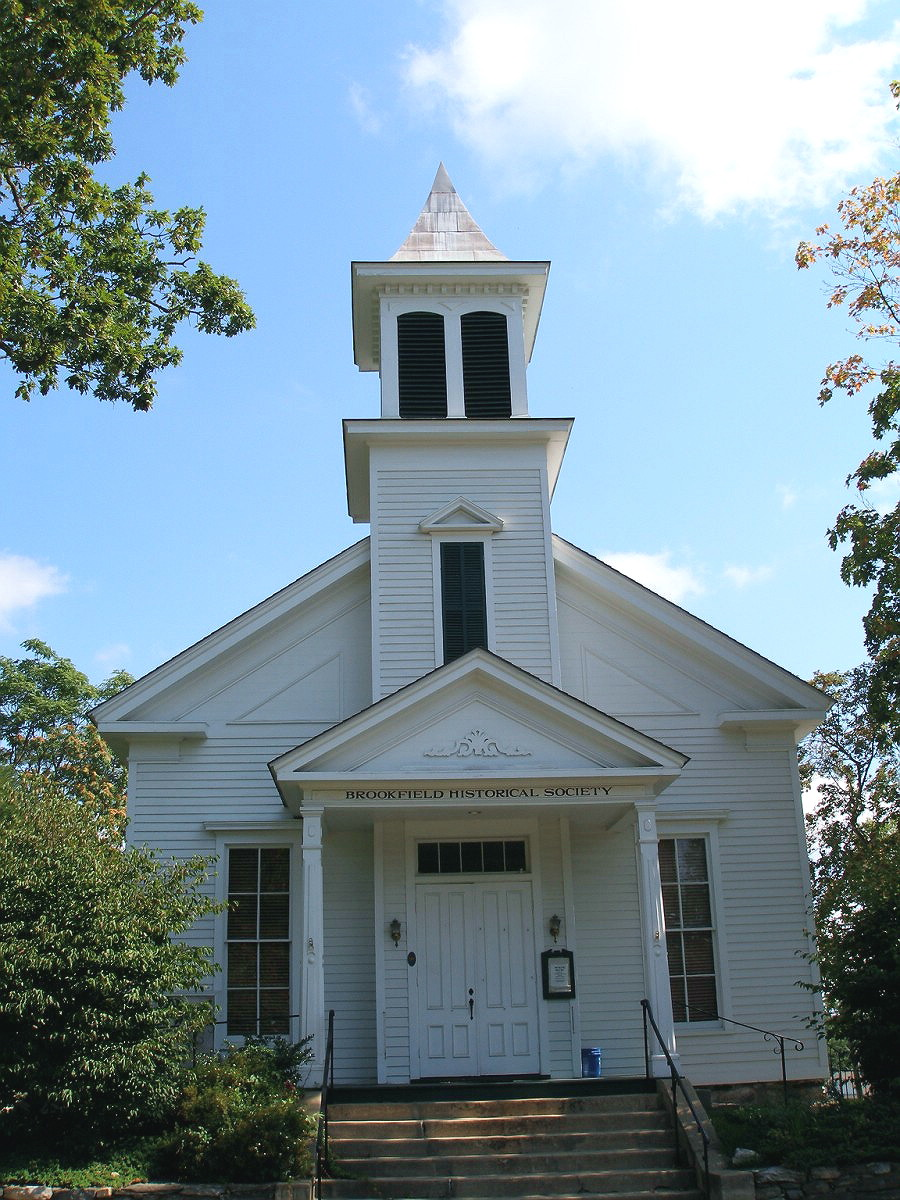
- Brookfield Historical Society

- Location within Connecticut Location within the United States
- Location: Around Junction of Route 25 & Route 133, Brookfield, Connecticut
- Coordinates: 41°28′4″N 73°23′17″W
- Area: 43 acres (17 ha)
- Built: 1720
- Architect: Antinozzi, Frederick H., Associates; Beckwith, Nash
- Architectural style: Bungalow/Craftsman, Greek Revival, Queen Anne
- NRHP reference No.: 91000992
- Added to NRHP: August 15, 1991

Photograph of Center Elementary School (taken in 1938)

The Brookfield Center Historic District in Brookfield, Connecticut is a historic district that was listed on the National Register of Historic Places in 1991. It is located in the vicinity of the junction of Route 133 and Route 25. The district represents the original settlement of the town of Brookfield and contains 67 residential, religious, and municipal buildings over a 43-acre (17 ha) area representing a wide range of architectural styles from the 18th to 20th centuries including Bungalow/Craftsman, Greek Revival, and Queen Anne style architecture. The district includes the old town hall, the Congregational Church of Brookfield, Saint Joseph Church & Elementary School, Center Elementary School (Public), the former general store (now a real estate agency), St. Paul's Episcopal Church, and the surrounding residential neighborhood. The district is architecturally significant as an accurate representation of the historical development of the original settlement of the Town of Brookfield as the buildings are well-preserved from the time they were built with minimal alterations and intrusions, including their spatial relationships to one another.

The area that is now Brookfield was settled about 1700, and was given its own parish in 1754, formed out of portions of Danbury, New Milford, and Newtown. It was incorporated in 1788. The road junction was where the first church, town hall, school, and tavern were built. In addition to housing the central religious and political functions, the center area was also home to a number of private schools in the 19th century.

Contributing properties in the district include:

- 150 Whisconier Road, c. 1700, a saltbox
- 140 Whisconier Road, a vernacular building with selected Federal style details, has semi-elliptical attic windows
- Congregational Church, an 1854 Greek Revival church designed by Beckwith Nash
- St. Paul's School (3 Longmeadow Hill Road), a building in the Italianate style
- 1907 gymnasium building of the Curtis School for Boys, now in use as the Brookfield Theatre for the Arts, a building in the Rustic Style.

== See also ==
- National Register of Historic Places listings in Fairfield County, Connecticut
