= Brookfield Junction station =

Rail station in Brookfield, Connecticut, USA

Brookfield Junction
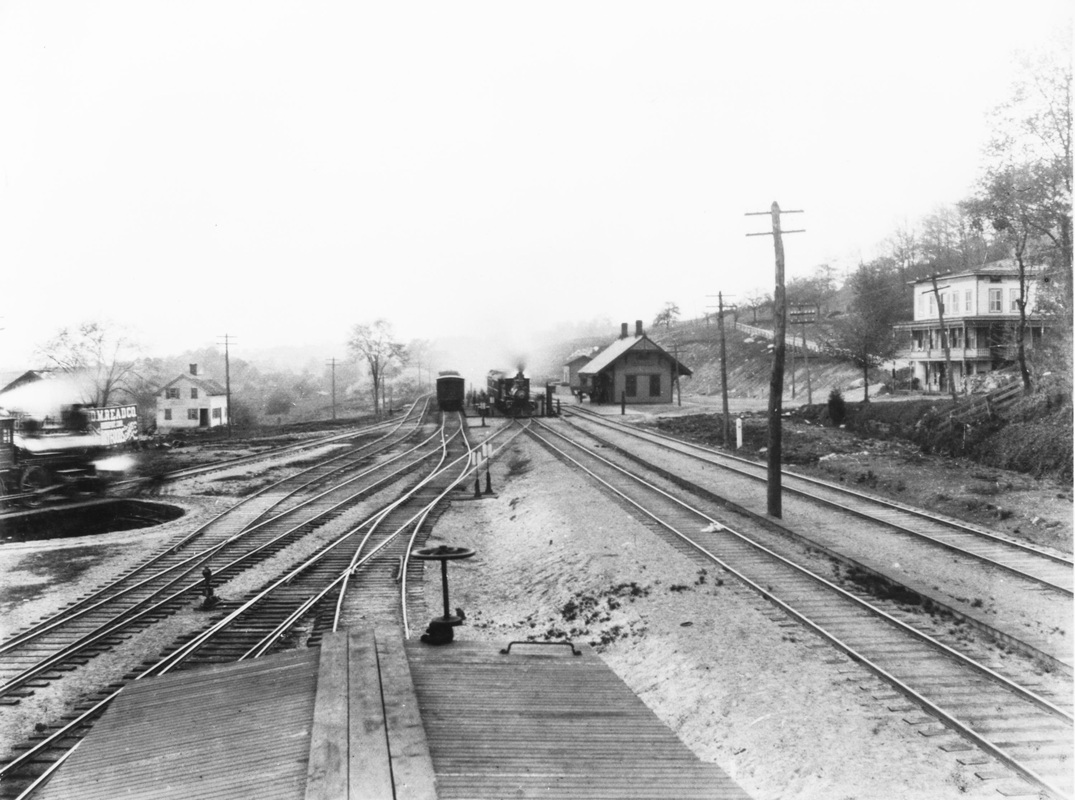
- Brookfield Junction turntable (left), station building and hotel (right)

General information
- Coordinates: 41.45265°N 73.39270°W
- Tracks: 3

History
- Opened: 1869
- Closed: 1925

Former services
Preceding station	New York, New Haven and Hartford Railroad	Following station
Danbury toward Norwalk and South Norwalk	Pittsfield Branch	Brookfield toward Pittsfield
Location

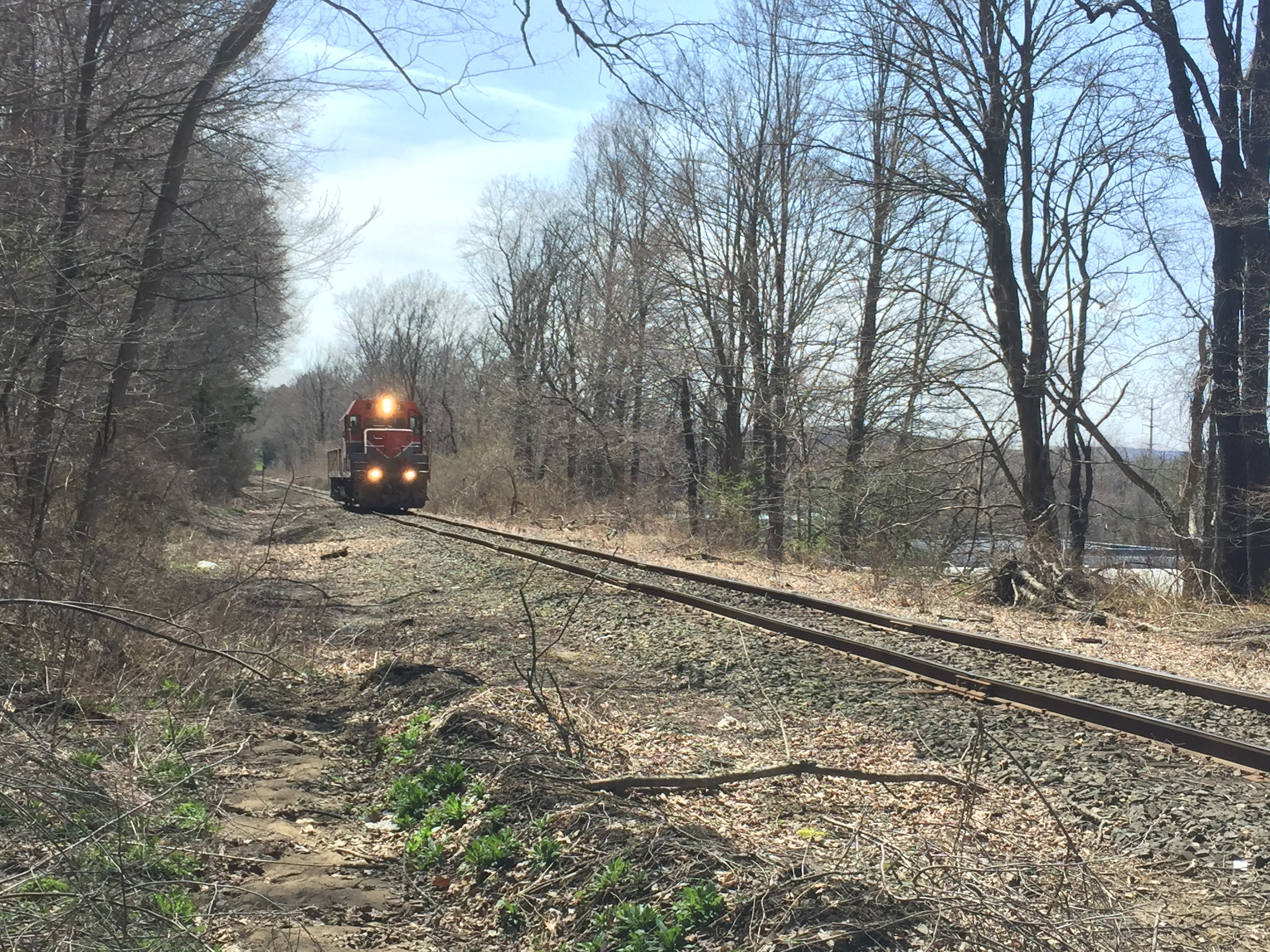
Former station site, photographed in 2017

Brookfield Junction was a station on the main line of the Housatonic Railroad and later the Pittsfield Branch of the New York, New Haven, and Hartford Railroad. Opened in 1869, the station was originally located on Stony Hill Road in the southern part of Brookfield, Connecticut. The station was closed in 1925 and was later demolished in the 1930s. The station site also housed a turntable, of which the foundation is still largely intact.

== History ==
The station opened in 1869 to serve as a junction where the New York, New Haven, and Hartford's Maybrook Line would meet at a wye with the Housatonic Railroad, creating a faster connection between New York City and Western Massachusetts. The station had two platforms: one low-level side platform that connected it to an adjoining freight depot, and one low-level island platform for eastbound trains. There was also a hotel and restaurant across the street that was built to serve the station, which burned down in 2006 after sitting vacant for many years.
