= Sunset Hill Golf Club =

American public golf course

- Location within the United States Location within Connecticut
- 41.451649°N 73.385635°W

Club information
- Location: Brookfield, Connecticut, U.S.
- Established: 1936; 90 years ago
- Type: Public
- Tota holes: 9
- Website: sunsethillgolfclub.com
- Designed by: Gene Sarazen
- Par: 35
- Length: 2,358 yards (2,156 m)
- Course rating: 31.3
- Slope rating: 100

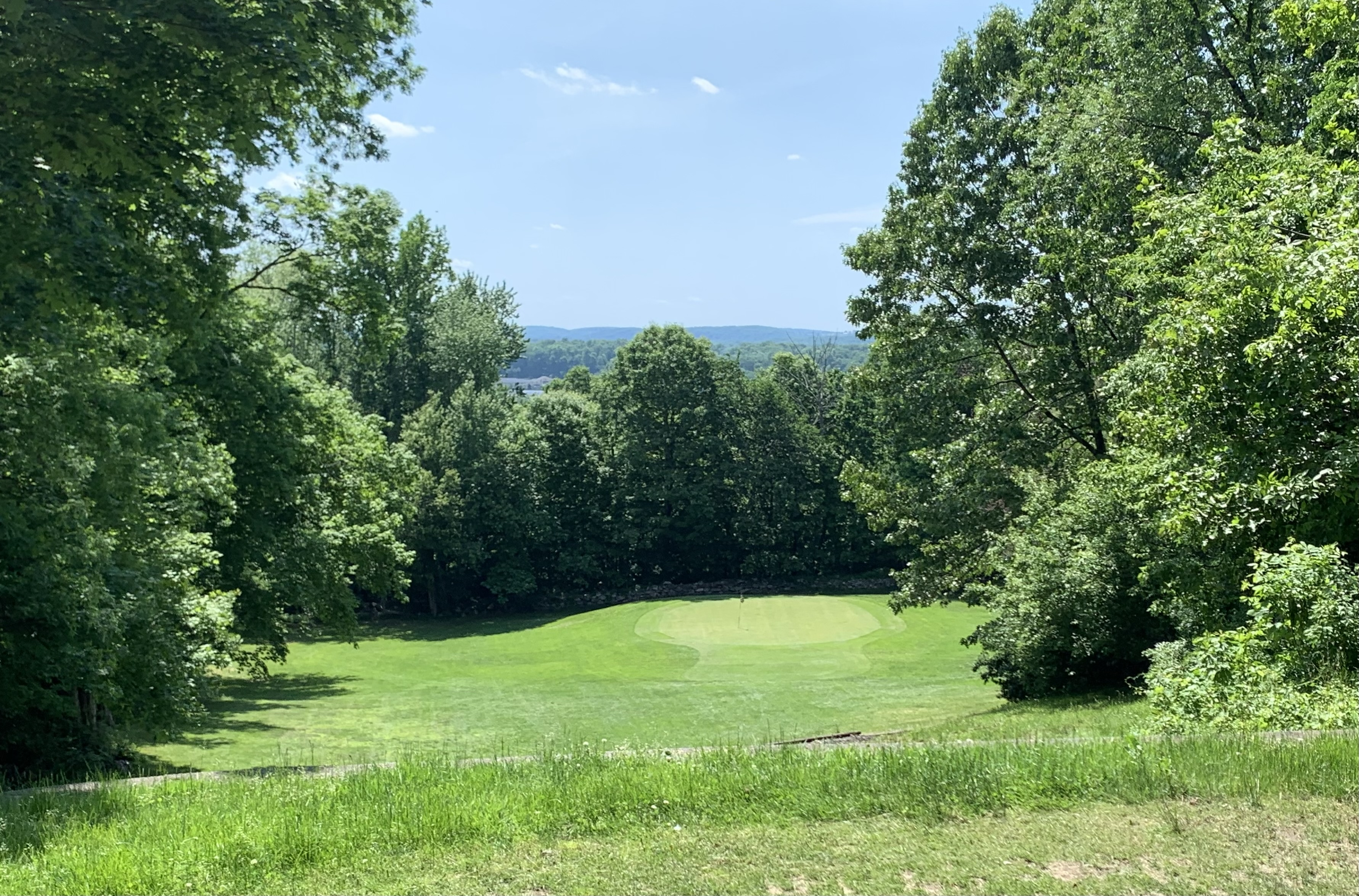
Overlooking the fairway for hole three

Sunset Hill Golf Club is a public golf course located at 13 Sunset Hill Road in Brookfield, Connecticut. The course was designed in 1936 by Gene Sarazen as a practice course for himself, to use while staying at his residence in Brookfield. Sarazen began opening the course to the public in the late 1930s.

The course has three ponds and several additional hazards including a sand trap and multiple bunkers. Walking is allowed on the course, and carts are made available as well. The course has a small café serving food and alcoholic beverages, as well as a pro shop. The course pro is Bob Dugan.
