= Candlewood Lake Club, Connecticut =

Census-designated place in Connecticut, United States

- Census-designated place
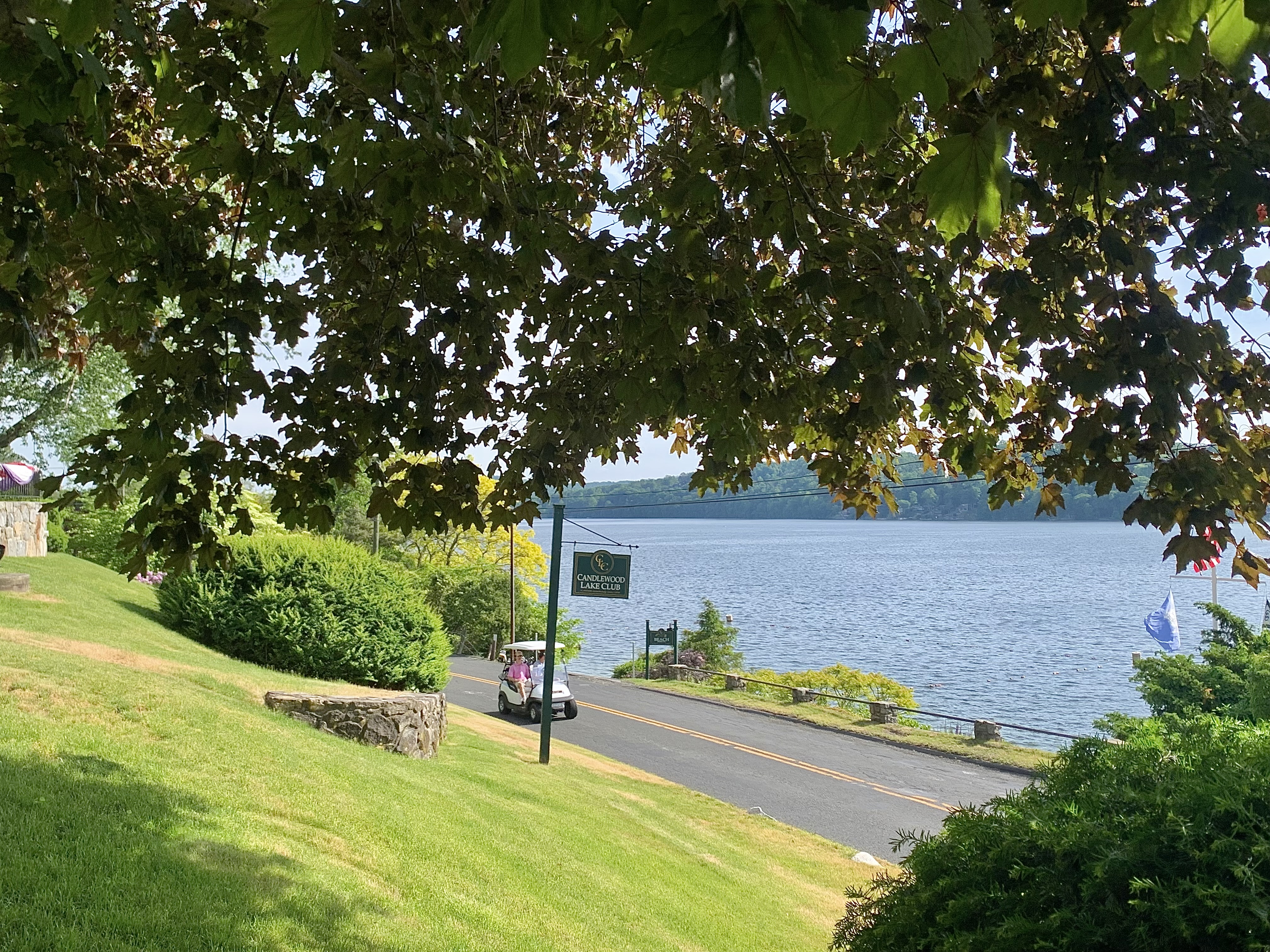
- Clubhouse Entrance

- Location within the Western Connecticut Planning Region and the state of Connecticut

- Location within Connecticut Location within the United States
- Coordinates: 41°29′37″N 73°26′15″W
- Country: United States
- State: Connecticut
- Counties: Fairfield, Litchfield
- Region: Western CT
- Towns: Brookfield, New Milford

Area
  - Total: 0.40 sq mi (1.04 km^{2})
  - Land: 0.31 sq mi (0.80 km^{2})
  - Water: 0.093 sq mi (0.24 km^{2})
- Elevation: 560 ft (170 m)
- Time zone: UTC-5 (Eastern (EST))
  - Summer (DST): UTC-4 (EDT)
- ZIP Codes: 06804 (Brookfield); 06776 (New Milford)
- Area codes: 203/475; 860/959
- FIPS code: 09-11500
- GNIS feature ID: 2805937
- Website: candlewoodlakeclub.com

Candlewood Lake Country Club
- Interactive map of Candlewood Lake Country Club

Club information
- Location: Brookfield, Connecticut and New Milford, Connecticut
- Established: 1935
- Type: Private
- Total holes: 9
- Par: 30
- Length: 1,775 yards (1,623 m)

Candlewood Lake Club is a private residential community and census-designated place (CDP) in the town of Brookfield, Fairfield County, and in the town of New Milford, Litchfield County, in the U.S. state of Connecticut. It is in the northwestern corner of Brookfield and the southwestern corner of New Milford, on the east shore of Candlewood Lake. It is bordered to the south by Candlewood Shores, to the north by Chimney Point, and to the west by the town of New Fairfield.

As of the 2020 census, Candlewood Lake Club had a population of 305.

The community also consists of a private country club complete with a marina, a nine-hole golf course, a clubhouse, tennis facilities, and recreational fields. There is also a private beach which is accessible to community residents and their guests, including those who are not members of the country club.

Candlewood Lake Club was first listed as a CDP prior to the 2020 census.
