= Brookfield Craft Center =

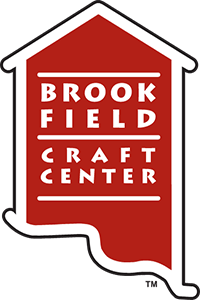

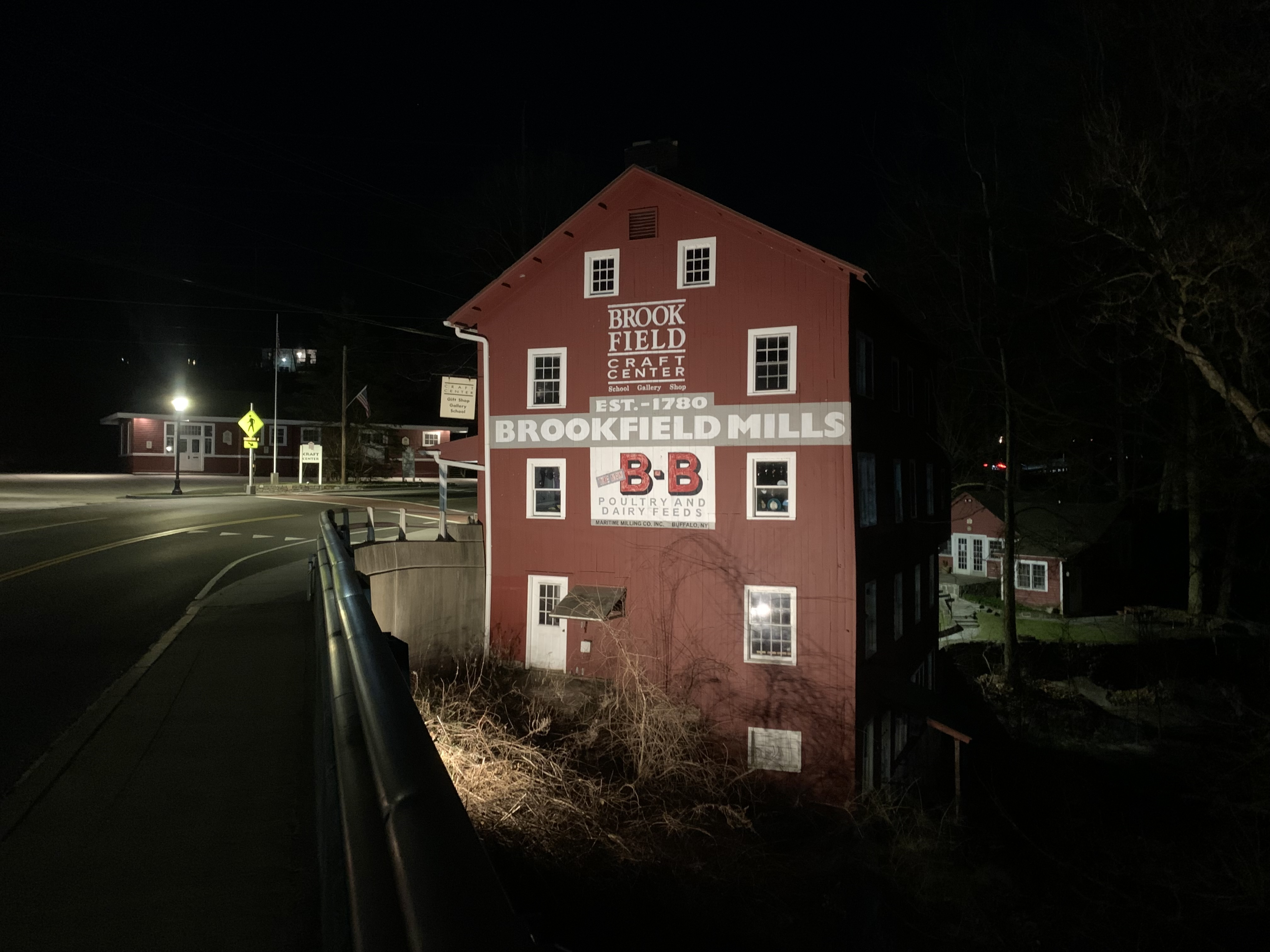
- Founded: 1954
- Founder: Nancy DuBois (Hagmayer)
- Type: Educational
- Purpose: Craft
- Location: 286 Whisconier Road, Brookfield, CT 06804
- Coordinates: 41.4822°N 73.4080°W
- Region served: New England, New York Tri-state region
- Website: brookfieldcraft.org

Brookfield Craft Center, located in Brookfield, Connecticut, is a 501(c)(3) not-for-profit organization, founded in 1954 with the mission "to teach and preserve the skills of fine craftsmanship and enable creativity and personal growth through craft education." Subjects taught at the craft center include basketry, beadwork, blacksmithing, bladesmithing, ceramics, glass, jewelry making, metalsmithing, fiber and weaving, woodturning, woodworking, photography, paper and book arts, decorative arts, painting and drawing, and business / marketing for artists.

Its 2.5-acre (1.0 ha) campus is located 6 miles (9.7 km) north of Danbury, Connecticut, on the banks of the Still River, with an historic mill building as its centerpiece. Its six buildings house seven fully equipped studios, an exhibition gallery, a retail craft gallery and gift shop, and housing for visiting faculty.
