= St. Joseph Church (Brookfield, Connecticut) =

Coordinates: 41°27′55.10″N 73°23′17.36″W

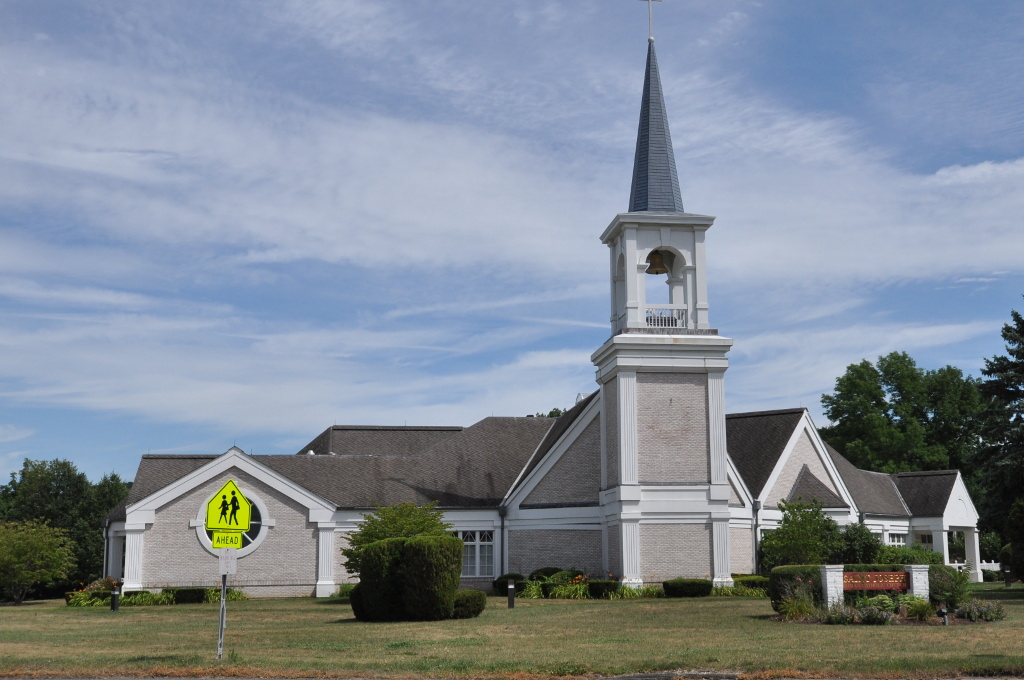
- St. Joseph Church
- Location: 163 Whisconier Road; Brookfield, Connecticut
- Country: United States
- Denomination: Roman Catholic
- Website: www.stjosephbrookfield.com

History
- Founded: late 1880s (original congregation); 1941 (original building); 1992 (current building)
- Dedicated: April 1992

Architecture
- Architect: Antinozzi Associates

Administration
- Province: Hartford
- Diocese: Bridgeport

Clergy
- Bishop: Most Rev. William E. Lori
- Priest(s): Msgr. Edward J. Scull (decd.) and Rev. Karol Ksiazek
- Pastor: Rev. George (Chip) O'Neill

St. Joseph is a Roman Catholic church in Brookfield, Connecticut, part of the Diocese of Bridgeport.

== History ==
A St. Joseph Mission Church has existed in Brookfield since the mid-1880s but the present parish was founded in 1941. The present St. Joseph Church was designed in the late 1980s by Antinozzi Associates now of Bridgeport, CT. The present church was dedicated in 1992.

== Peragallo Pipe Organ ==
The organ was designed by the Peragallo Pipe Organ Company of Paterson, New Jersey. It is a pipe/digital 3 manual instrument and was originally installed in 2002. In August 2010 the Parish announced plans to bring Peragallo back to modify the instrument.

== School ==
An elementary school located on the church property, originally Saint Joseph School, it was renamed Saint Joseph Catholic Academy in 2018 as it experimented with a new classroom model. Opening in 1958, it closed its doors in June, 2020.
