= Brookfield, Connecticut =

Town in Connecticut, United States

- Town
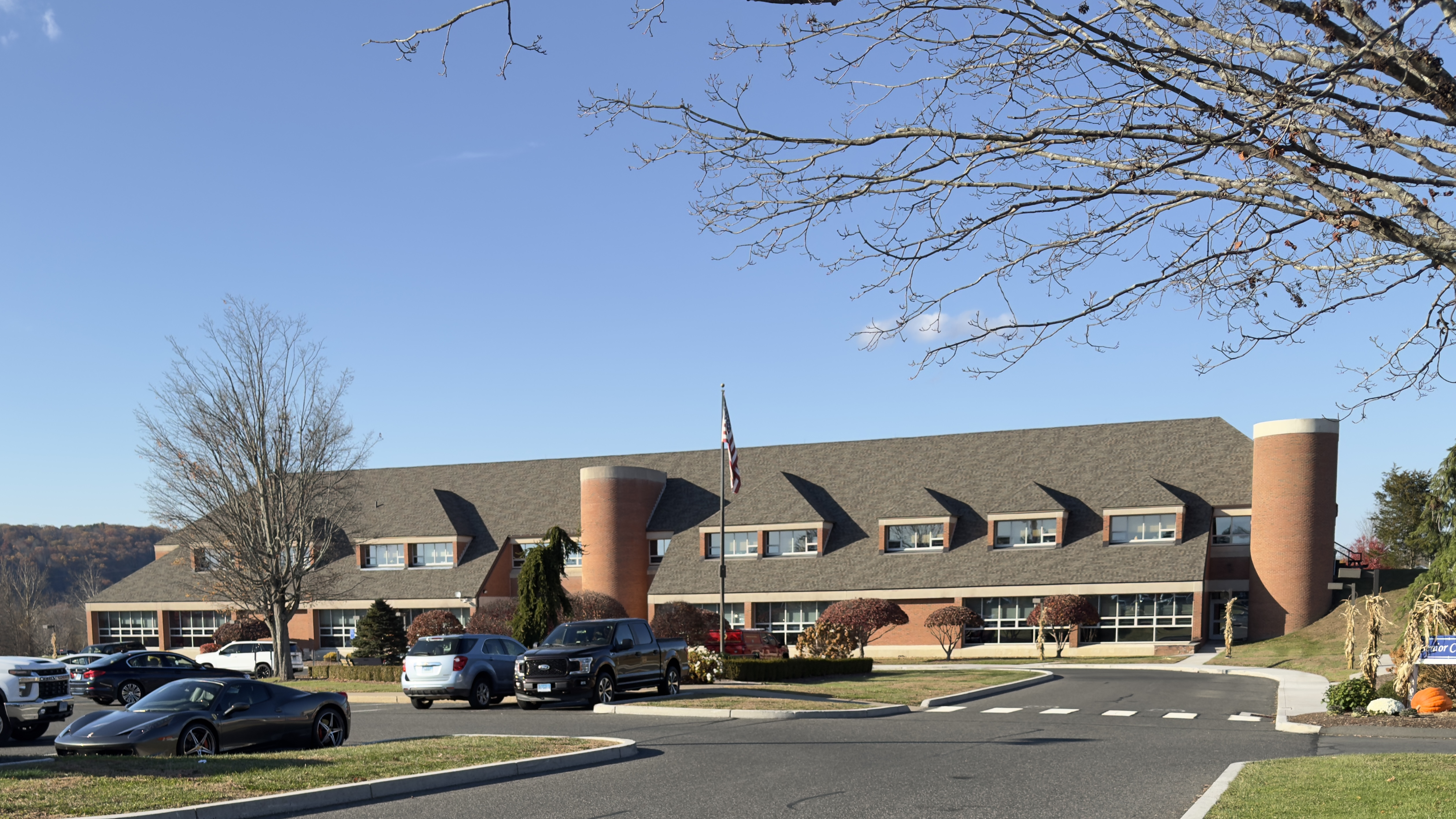
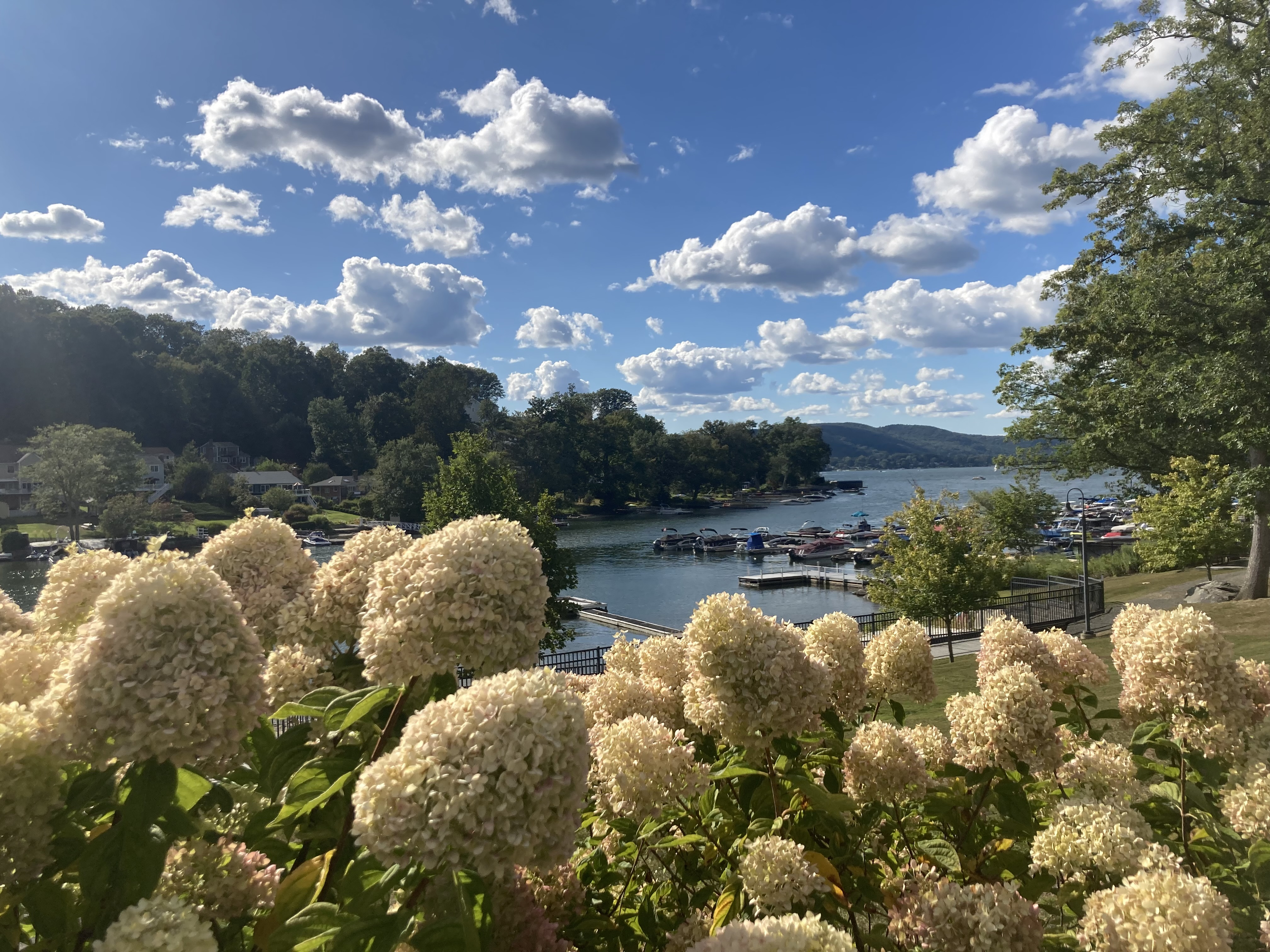
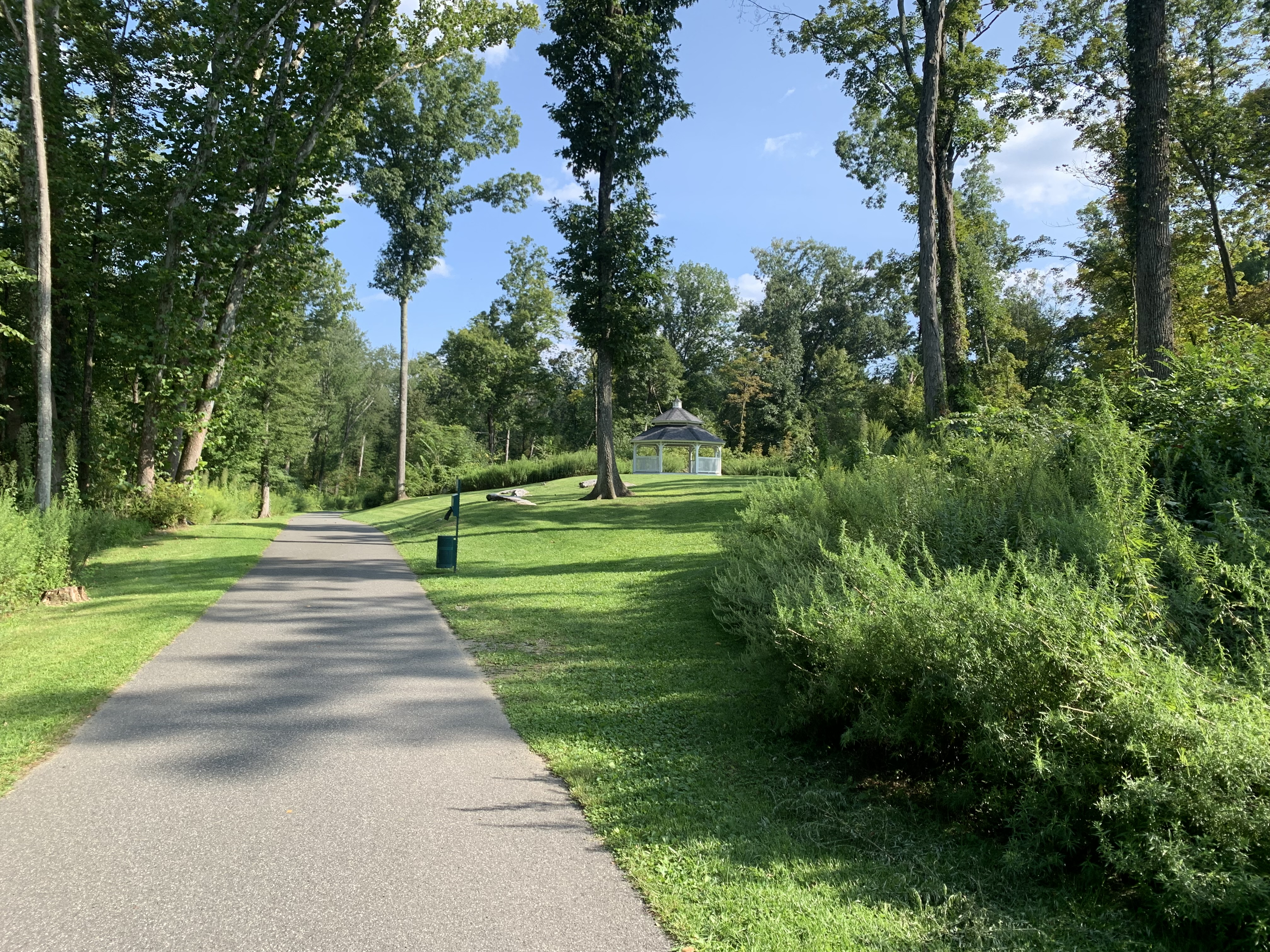
- Town Hall Town Beach (Candlewood Lake) Still River Greenway

- Seal
- Motto: "Pro Patria"
- Coordinates: 41°28′07″N 73°23′31″W
- Country: United States
- U.S. state: Connecticut
- County: Fairfield
- Region: Western CT
- Incorporated: 1788

Government
  - Type: Select board-town meeting
  - First selectman: Stephen C. Dunn (D)
  - Selectman: Robert D. Belden (D)
  - Selectman: Karl F. Hinger (R)

Area
  - Total: 20.4 sq mi (52.8 km^{2})
  - Land: 19.8 sq mi (51.3 km^{2})
  - Water: 0.62 sq mi (1.6 km^{2})
- Elevation: 460 ft (140 m)

Population (2020)
  - Total: 17,528
  - Density: 806.5/sq mi (311.4/km^{2})
- Time zone: UTC−5 (EST)
  - Summer (DST): UTC−4 (EDT)
- ZIP Code: 06804
- Area codes: 203/475
- FIPS code: 09-08980
- GNIS feature ID: 0213399
- Website: www.brookfieldct.gov

Brookfield is a town in Fairfield County, Connecticut, United States, situated within the southern foothills of the Berkshire Mountains. The population was 17,528 at the 2020 census. The town is located 55 miles (89 km) northeast of New York City, making it part of the New York-Newark, NY-NJ-CT-PA combined statistical area. The town is part of the Western Connecticut Planning Region. In July 2013, Money magazine ranked Brookfield the 26th-best place to live in the United States, and the best place to live in Connecticut.

Colonists settled in what is now known as Brookfield in 1710, led by John Muirwood and other colonial founders including Hawley, Peck and Merwin. They bartered for the land from the Wyantenuck and the Potatuck Nations who were ruled under the Sachems Waramaug and Pocono. Sachem Pocono's village was in an enormous palisade along the Still River. Colonists first established the area as the Parish of Newbury, incorporating parts of neighboring Newtown and Danbury. The parish later was renamed and incorporated as the town of Brookfield in 1788, named for Rev. Thomas Brooks, the first minister of the parish's Congregational church.

== History ==
A vintage postcard from the Nutmeg Inn

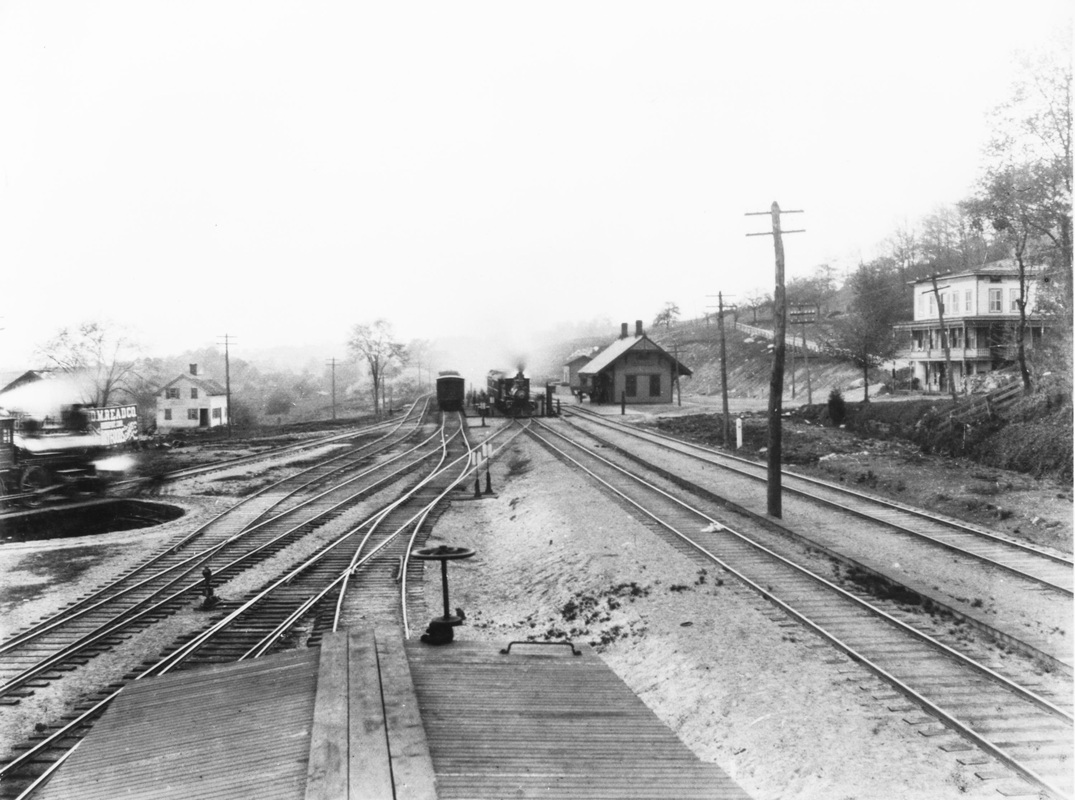
The rail depot of Brookfield Junction

Early people who lived in Brookfield were subsistence farmers, gatherers, and hunters. The main food sources were corn, beans, squash and wild foods found in the rocky, heavily forested foothills of the Berkshire Mountains of Brookfield and New Milford. Such wild foods that were harvested were white oak acorns, American chestnuts, shag bark hickory nuts, may apples, beach nuts and Solomon's seal. The hunted animals that were taken from the forest and rivers were deer, passenger pigeon, turkey, bass, trout, crawfish, squirrel, rabbit and others. In the 18th century the community was called "Newbury", a name that came from the three towns from which its land was taken—New Milford, Newtown, and Danbury.

As traveling to surrounding churches was difficult in winter, in 1752 the General Assembly granted the community the right to worship in area homes from September through March. In 1754, the General Assembly granted permission for the Parish of Newbury to build its own meeting house and recruit its own minister. On September 28, 1757, the first Congregational Church building was dedicated. The Reverend Thomas Brooks was ordained as the first settled minister. When incorporated in 1778, the town's name was changed to Brookfield in honor of Brooks, who was still the minister.

Along the Still River, mills were in operation as early as 1732 in an area that became known as the Iron Works District. Brookfield was a thriving town with iron furnaces, grist mills, sawmills, comb shops, carding and cotton mills, a paper mill, a knife factory, hat factories, stage-coach shops, lime kilns, harness shops and other plants in operation. The grist mill still stands, as the Brookfield Craft Center. The Iron Works Aqueduct Company, formed in 1837 to supply water from mountain springs to the Iron Works District, still supplies water as the Brookfield Water Company.

Before 1912, the town had two train stations: one in the Iron Works District near the present Brookfield Market and a second, Junction Station, near the corner of Junction Road and Stony Hill Road.

The Danbury & Bethel Gas and Electric Company brought electricity to Brookfield in 1915. The .475 Wildey Magnum gun, later made famous in the 1985 Charles Bronson movie Death Wish 3, was developed by Wildey J. Moore in Brookfield in the early 1970s (the factory has since moved to Warren, Connecticut).

In the early 1970s, the town was home to the headquarters of Lego USA.

Throughout the 1970s and late 20th century, Brookfield saw a massive influx in its population. This is attributed to New Yorkers who began relocating from the city to the suburbs. This created rapid real estate development in Brookfield, and turned Brookfield into a popular commuter town for those who work in and around New York City. The top professions of residents today are in the fields of professional, scientific, and technical services, health care, and finance and insurance. As of 2022, 88.7% of residents in the workforce hold white-collar jobs, and about 20% work remotely full-time.

== Geography ==
According to the United States Census Bureau, the town has a total area of 20.4 square miles (53 km^{2}), of which 19.8 square miles (51 km^{2}) is land and 0.6 square miles (1.6 km^{2}), or 2.94%, is water. It borders Bethel to the south, Newtown to the southeast, Danbury to the southwest, New Fairfield to the west, New Milford to the northwest, and Bridgewater to the northeast.

Brookfield is located between the two largest lakes in Connecticut. Candlewood Lake (the largest) spans the west side of the town, while Lake Lillinonah spans the entire east side. The Still River also runs directly through the town, flowing directionally from south to north.

=== Neighborhoods ===
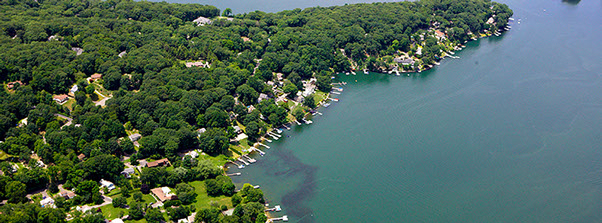
An aerial view of Candlewood Shores in Brookfield

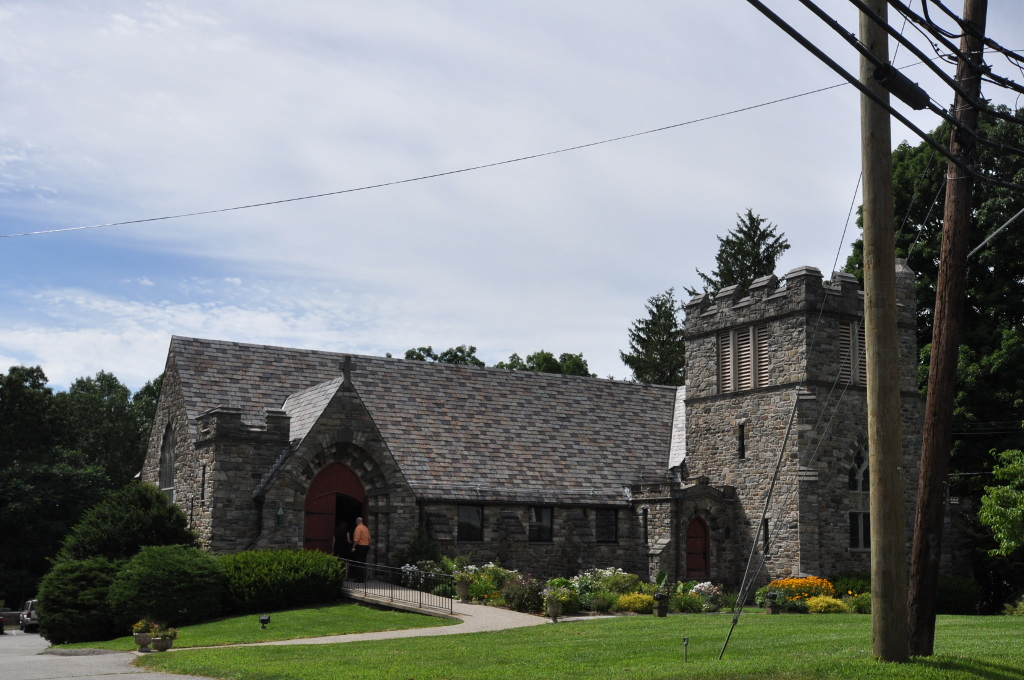
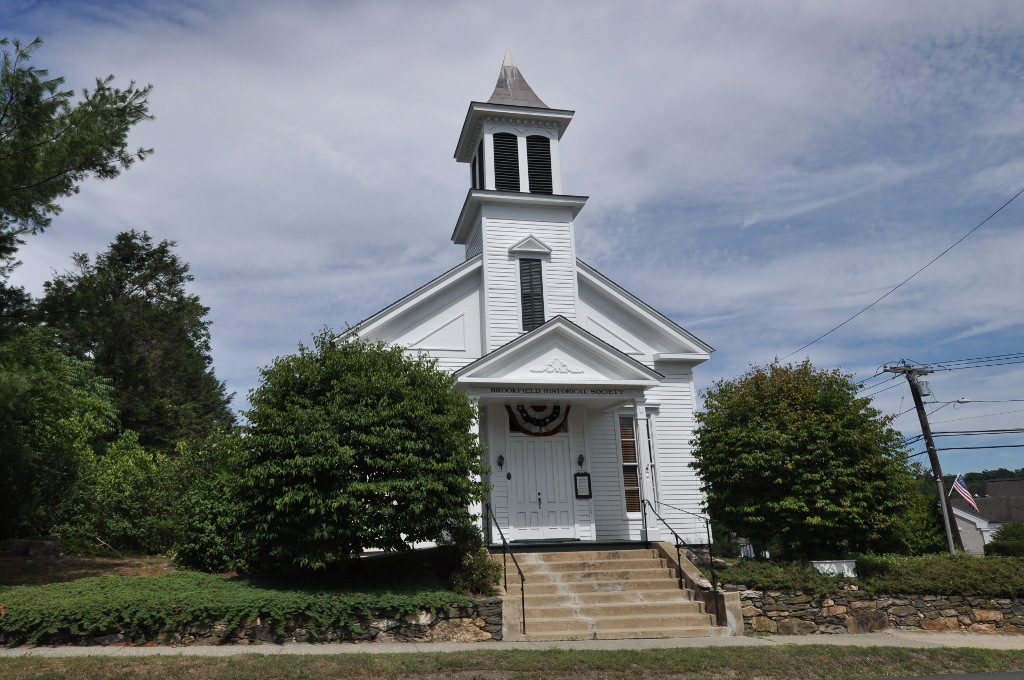
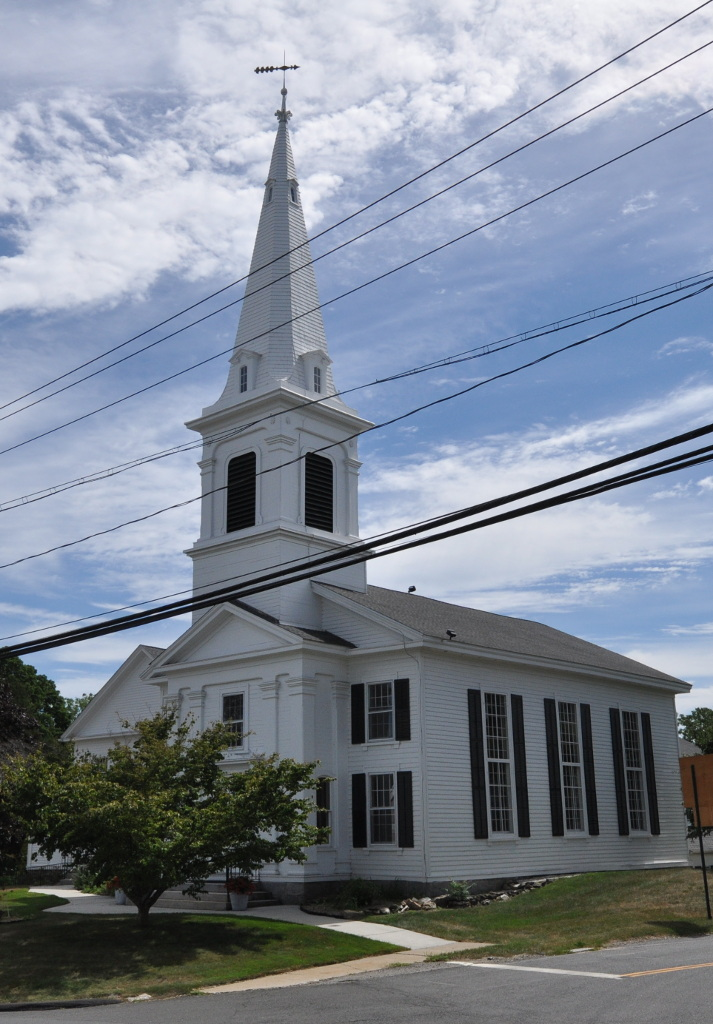
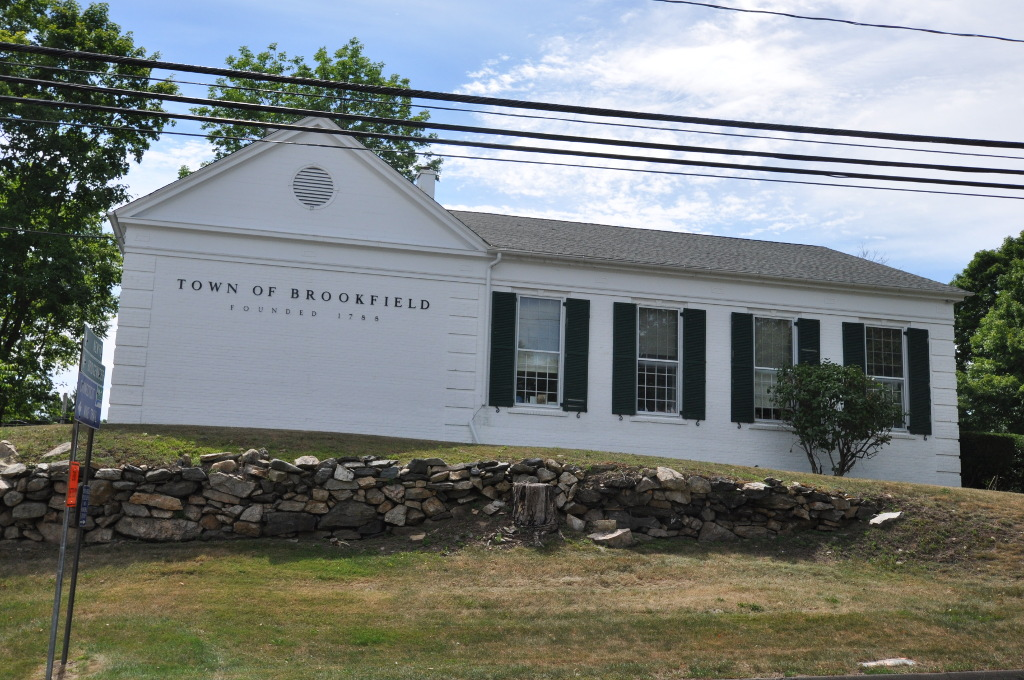
Various buildings located throughout the Town Center Historic District

The town's largest neighborhoods include:

- Brookfield Town Center (known to locals as "Four Corners") is the downtown shopping district of Brookfield. The area is experiencing heavy growth and revitalization in recent years with new apartment and shopping buildings, bringing over 150 new apartments and dozens of new stores. It is also a potential site for a future railway station.
- Brookfield Center is the original town center and a historic district, added NRHP, September 15, 1991). The original town hall, original general store, historic society, several churches, and an elementary school are located here.

Other named minor neighborhoods and geographic locations in the town are:

- Barkwood Falls
- Brookfield Junction
- Candlewood Lake Club
- Candlewood Orchards
- Candlewood Shores
- East Iron Works
- Huckleberry Hill
- Iron Works
- Long Meadow Hill
- Obtuse
- Pocono Ridge
- Prospect Hill
- Viva Farms
- West Iron Works
- Whisconier

=== Climate ===
Brookfield has a humid continental climate, similar to that of New York City, with mild to warm humid summers and cold to very cold winters. The highest recorded temperature was 103 °F (39 °C) in July 1966, while the lowest recorded temperature was −15 °F (−26 °C) in 1968. Snowfall is generally frequent in winter while average precipitation is most common in September.

Climate data for Brookfield, Connecticut
Month	Jan	Feb	Mar	Apr	May	Jun	Jul	Aug	Sep	Oct	Nov	Dec	Year
Record high °F (°C)	71 (22)	77 (25)	92 (33)	95 (35)	97 (36)	98 (37)	106 (41)	103 (39)	100 (38)	89 (32)	82 (28)	76 (24)	106 (41)
Mean daily maximum °F (°C)	36 (2)	40 (4)	49 (9)	61 (16)	72 (22)	81 (27)	85 (29)	83 (28)	75 (24)	63 (17)	51 (11)	40 (4)	61 (16)
Mean daily minimum °F (°C)	19 (−7)	22 (−6)	29 (−2)	39 (4)	48 (9)	59 (15)	64 (18)	62 (17)	53 (12)	42 (6)	34 (1)	25 (−4)	41 (5)
Record low °F (°C)	−18 (−28)	−10 (−23)	−9 (−23)	14 (−10)	26 (−3)	36 (2)	40 (4)	38 (3)	28 (−2)	19 (−7)	10 (−12)	−11 (−24)	−18 (−28)
Average rainfall inches (mm)	3.76 (96)	3.30 (84)	4.43 (113)	4.36 (111)	4.57 (116)	4.74 (120)	4.99 (127)	4.55 (116)	4.66 (118)	4.89 (124)	4.54 (115)	4.16 (106)	52.95 (1,345)

== Economy ==
Companies in Brookfield include:

- BNP Associates, an airport systems designer, is headquartered in Brookfield.
- Branson Ultrasonics, a division of Emerson, is headquartered in Brookfield.
- Bridgewater Chocolate, a premium chocolate manufacturer, is headquartered in Brookfield.
- Cerulean Studios, an instant messaging software company, is headquartered in Brookfield.
- Lego USA was formerly headquartered in Brookfield.
- McMullin Manufacturing Corporation, a contract manufacturing company of precision metal stampings, fabricated metal parts and assemblies, is headquartered in Brookfield.
- Millbrook Press, an international book publisher, was formerly headquartered in Brookfield.
- Nordex Inc, a manufacturer of medical and robotics components, is headquartered in Brookfield.
- Photronics, a major semiconductor manufacturer, is headquartered in Brookfield.
- ROMTech, a medical device technology company, is headquartered in Brookfield.
- Southridge Technology, an IT company, is headquartered in Brookfield.
- Townsquare Media has a corporate office in Danbury.
- Trendhaven Investment Management, an investment firm, is headquartered in Brookfield.

== Demographics ==
Historical population
Census	Pop.	Note	%±
1820	1,159		—
1850	1,359		—
1860	1,224		−9.9%
1870	1,193		−2.5%
1880	1,152		−3.4%
1890	989		−14.1%
1900	1,046		5.8%
1910	1,101		5.3%
1920	896		−18.6%
1930	926		3.3%
1940	1,345		45.2%
1950	1,688		25.5%
1960	3,405		101.7%
1970	9,688		184.5%
1980	12,872		32.9%
1990	14,113		9.6%
2000	15,664		11.0%
2010	16,452		5.0%
2020	17,528		6.5%

The 2020 US Census counted a total population of 17,528. The total number of households in Brookfield was recorded at 6,209 with an average of 2.73 persons per household. The population density was recorded at 861.9 persons per square mile (332.8 persons/km^{2}).

According to the 2020 Census, the population of Brookfield was 86.4% White, 4.2% Asian, 3.1% Black or African American, and 0.2% Pacific Islander. Individuals from two or more races made up 4.5%. In addition, Latinos of any race made up 6.5% of Brookfield's population. About 28.5% of Brookfield residents were younger than age 18 as of 2020; higher than the U.S. average of 24%. 15.1% of Brookfield residents were born outside of the United States.

As of the census of 2000, there were 15,664 people, 5,572 households, and 4,368 families residing in the town. The population density was 791.1 inhabitants per square mile (305.4/km^{2}). There were 5,781 housing units at an average density of 292.0 per square mile (112.7/km^{2}). The racial makeup of the town was 95.29% White, 0.76% Black or African American, 0.07% Native American, 2.48% Asian, 0.61% from other races, and 0.79% from two or more races. 2.37% of the population were Hispanic or Latino of any race.

There were 5,573 households, out of which 39.1% had children under the age of 18 living with them, 68.1% were married couples living together, 7.8% had a female householder with no husband present, and 21.6% were non-families. 17.2% of all households were made up of individuals, and 6.5% had someone living alone who was 65 years of age or older. The average household size was 2.80 and the average family size was 3.18.

In the town, the population was spread out, with 27.4% under the age of 18, 4.9% from 18 to 24, 29.2% from 25 to 44, 27.8% from 45 to 64, and 10.8% who were 65 years of age or older. The median age was 39 years. For every 100 females, there were 94.7 males, slightly under the US average. For every 100 females age 18 and over, there were 92.0 males.

In 2022, the median income for a household in the town was $132,950, and the median income for a family was $172,383. The per capita income for the town was $63,411. About 1.2% of families and 2.3% of the population were below the poverty line, including 2.4% of those under age 18 and 2.3% of those age 65 or over.

== Government and politics ==
Elected bodies in the town government are a three-member Board of Selectmen, a seven-member Board of Education, a six-member Board of Finance, a five-member Planning and Zoning Commission, three-member Board of Assessment Appeals, and a 100-member, nonpartisan Representative Town Meeting. The town has several elective offices as well: the town clerk, probate judge, registrar of voters, tax collector and treasurer.

The Board of Finance approves financial measures, including the town budget; the Board of Education controls the town's public schools; the Representative Town Meeting is the main legislative body of the town. The three selectmen are elected on a town-wide basis, although each person can only vote for two members. This assures that there will almost always be one Democrat and two Republicans or two Democrats and one Republican. Many of the town committees have equal representation between Democrats and Republicans, regardless of the vote breakdown, since each individual can only vote for half as many seats as are available.

At the state level, Brookfield is in the 107th House district, currently represented by State Rep. Martin Foncello (R). Brookfield is part of the 30th and 32nd Senate districts, currently represented by State Sen. Stephen Harding (R) of Brookfield, and State Sen. Eric Berthel (R) of Watertown. At the federal level, Brookfield is part of the 5th congressional district, which is represented by Rep. Jahana Hayes (D).

In the 2020 Presidential Election, Joe Biden (D) received the majority of votes cast by Brookfield residents. This was the first majority vote in Brookfield for a Democratic presidential candidate since Lyndon B. Johnson's win in 1964. There are more registered Republicans than Democrats in the town, though a plurality of registered voters are unaffiliated with either party.

=== Taxes ===
As of 2022, the mill rate in Brookfield is 25.88.

Voter registration and party enrollment as of November 1, 2022
Party	Active voters	Inactive voters	Total voters	Percentage
Democratic	3,189	264	3,453	25.14%
Republican	3,847	234	4,081	29.71%
Unaffiliated	5,515	441	5,956	43.36%
Minor parties	228	18	246	1.79%
Total	12,779	957	13,736	100%

Past elections results

Brookfield town vote by party in presidential elections
Year	Democratic	Republican	Third Parties
2024	47.17% 5,029	51.19% 5,458	1.64% 174
2020	50.21% 5,426	48.36% 5,226	1.43% 155
2016	44.01% 4,216	51.91% 4,973	4.08% 391
2012	43.68% 3,916	55.11% 4,941	1.21% 108
2008	47.29% 4,340	51.79% 4,753	0.92% 84
2004	40.78% 3,619	58.17% 5,162	1.05% 93
2000	43.84% 3,536	51.49% 4,153	4.67% 377
1996	40.18% 2,982	48.92% 3,630	10.90% 809
1992	31.46% 2,657	44.40% 3,750	24.14% 2,039
1988	31.96% 2,261	67.22% 4,756	0.82% 58
1984	26.68% 1,834	73.03% 5,020	0.29% 20
1980	26.98% 1,635	59.97% 3,634	13.05% 791
1976	34.70% 1,856	64.49% 3,449	0.80% 43
1972	24.50% 1,208	73.67% 3,632	1.83% 90
1968	30.68% 1,147	63.17% 2,362	6.15% 230
1964	52.75% 1,475	47.25% 1,321	0.00% 0
1960	30.27% 544	69.73% 1,253	0.00% 0
1956	11.54% 139	88.46% 1,065	0.00% 0

== Education ==
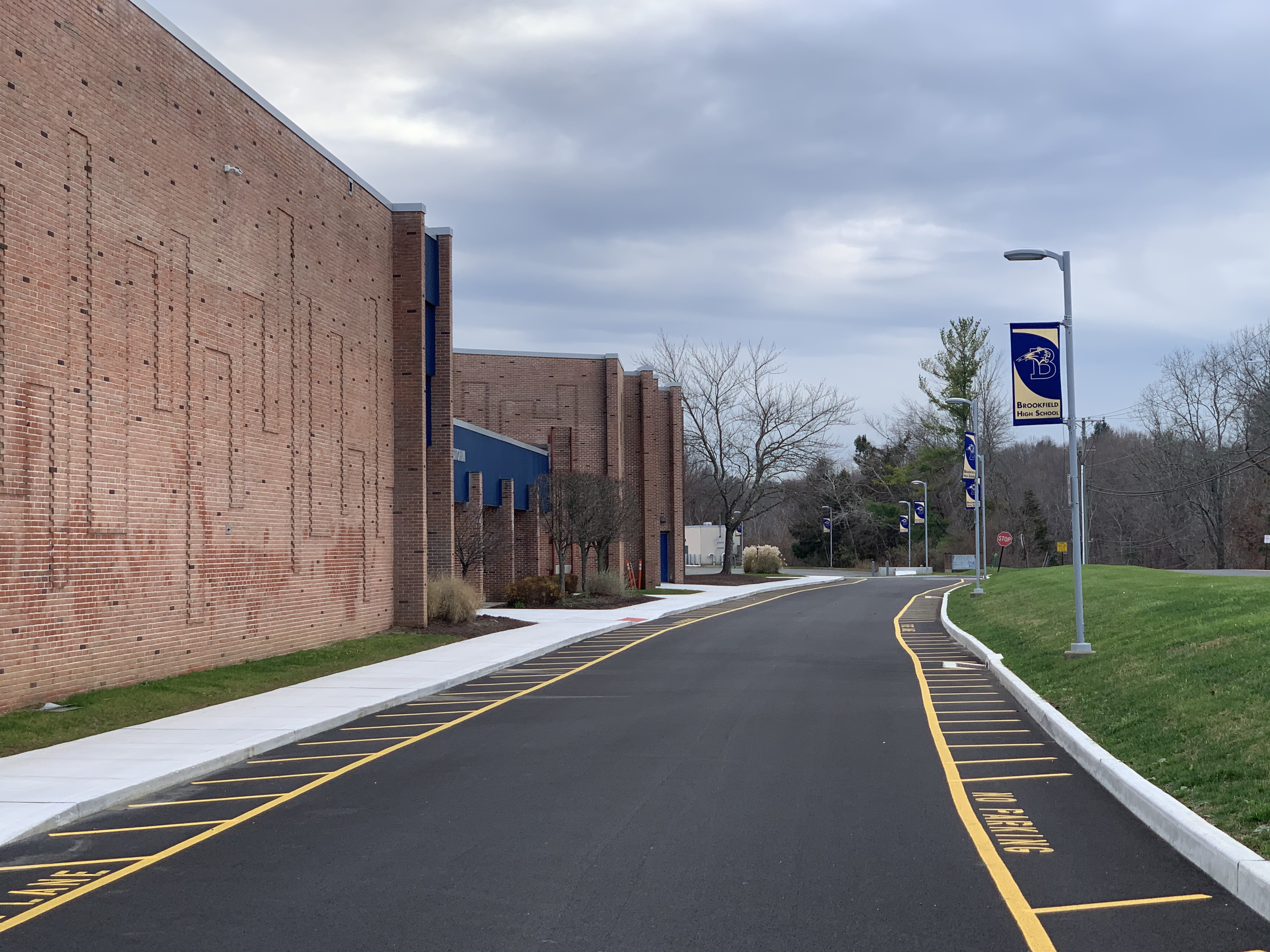
View of Brookfield High School, December 2020

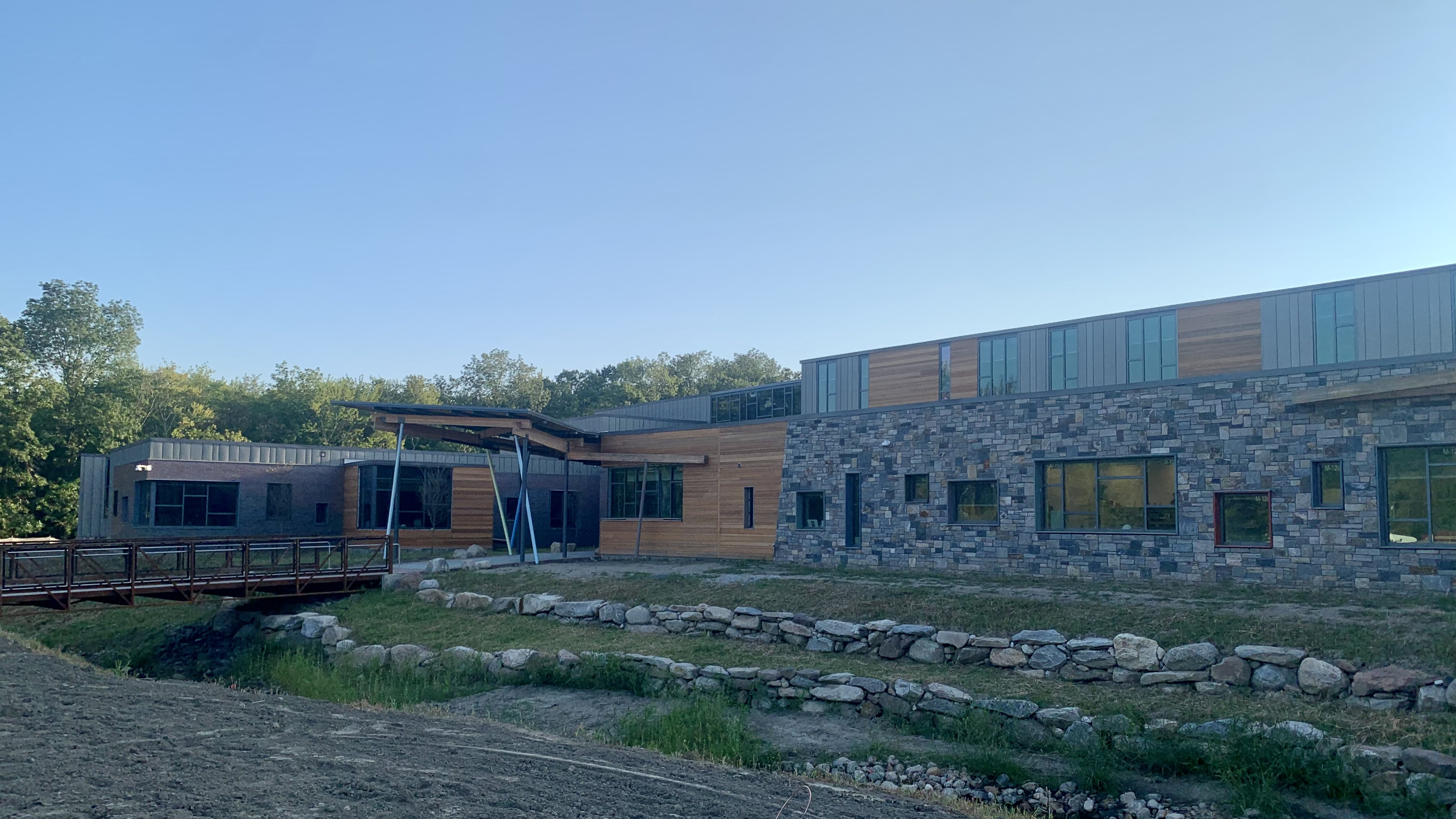
View of Candlewood Lake Elementary School, September 2023

=== Public schools ===
- Brookfield High School (Grades 9–12)
- Whisconier Middle School (Grades 6–8)
- Candlewood Lake Elementary School (Grades Pre-K–5)

In 2021, construction began on the new Candlewood Lake Elementary School at a construction cost of $78.1 million. The school is located on the grounds of the former Huckleberry Hill School, and replaced both Huckleberry and Center School (Pre-K–5). The school opened in September 2023, in time for the 2023–24 school year.

=== Private schools ===
- St. Joseph Elementary School (Catholic School, Grades Pre-K–8; now houses the Danbury Primary School for kindergartners)
- Christian Life Academy (Christian School, Grade Pre-K)
- Country Kids Child Care (Grades Pre-K–K)
- Goddard School (Grades Pre-K–K)
- Montessori Community School (Grades Pre-K–K)
- Curtis School for Boys (All-boys boarding school open from 1883 to 1943. Starting in the 1920s, girls were allowed to enroll as day-students. The school has since become the Brookfield Theatre for the Arts.)

The Western Connecticut Academy of International Studies is a magnet school in Danbury, Connecticut, that students (Grades K–5) from Brookfield are accepted into. Students to this school are also accepted from Bethel, Redding, Ridgefield, New Fairfield, New Milford, Newtown, and other regional communities. Henry Abbott Technical High School is a public technical high school for students grades 9–12, being located in Danbury but also accepting students from other regional communities.

Many residents of Brookfield attend private schools in the Greater Danbury area, including Canterbury School (9–12), Immaculate High School (9–12) and Wooster School (Pre-K–12).

== Downtown redevelopment project ==
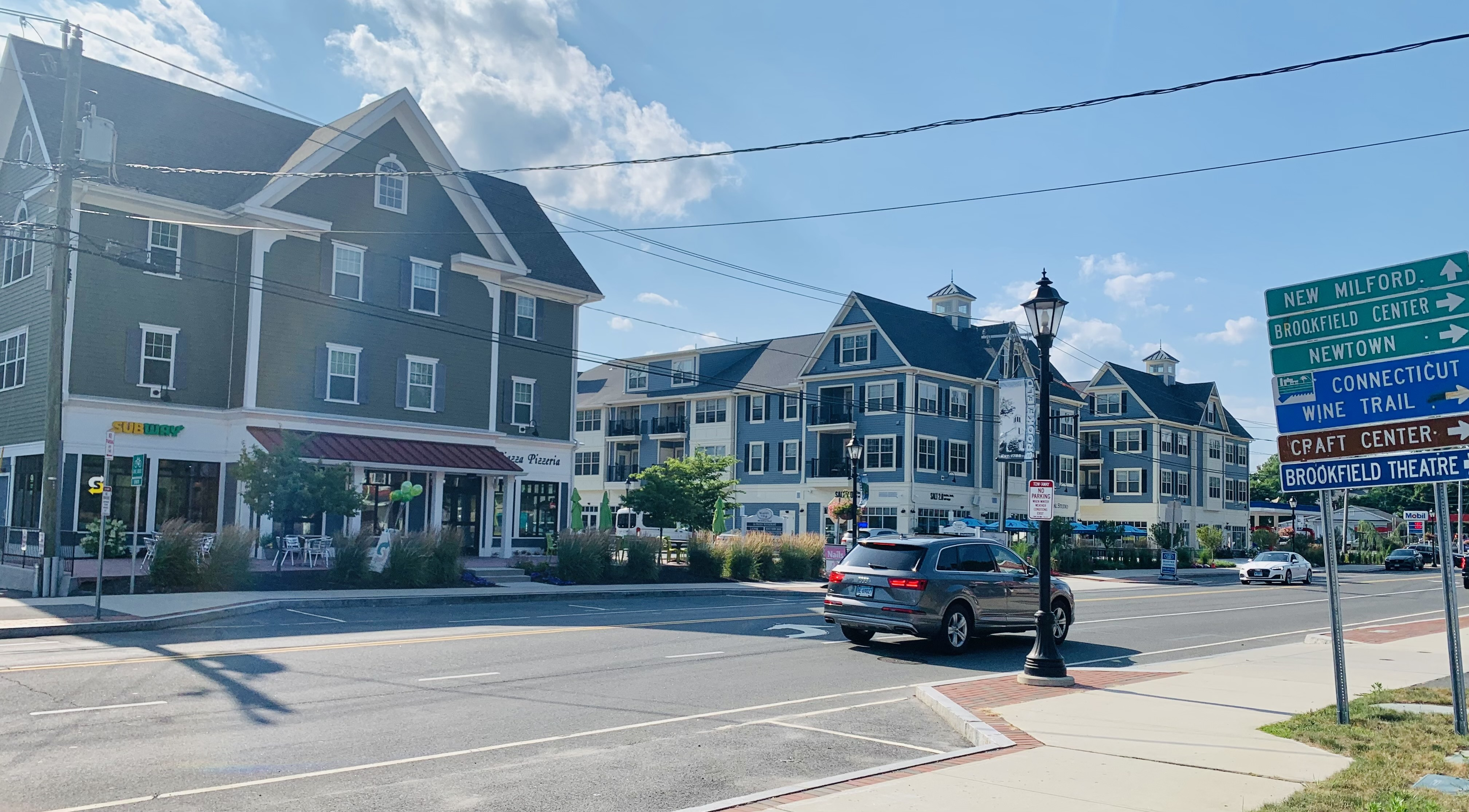
The newly completed streetscape of Brookfield's Town Center District, also known as Four Corners, which includes sidewalks, parallel parking and new storefronts.

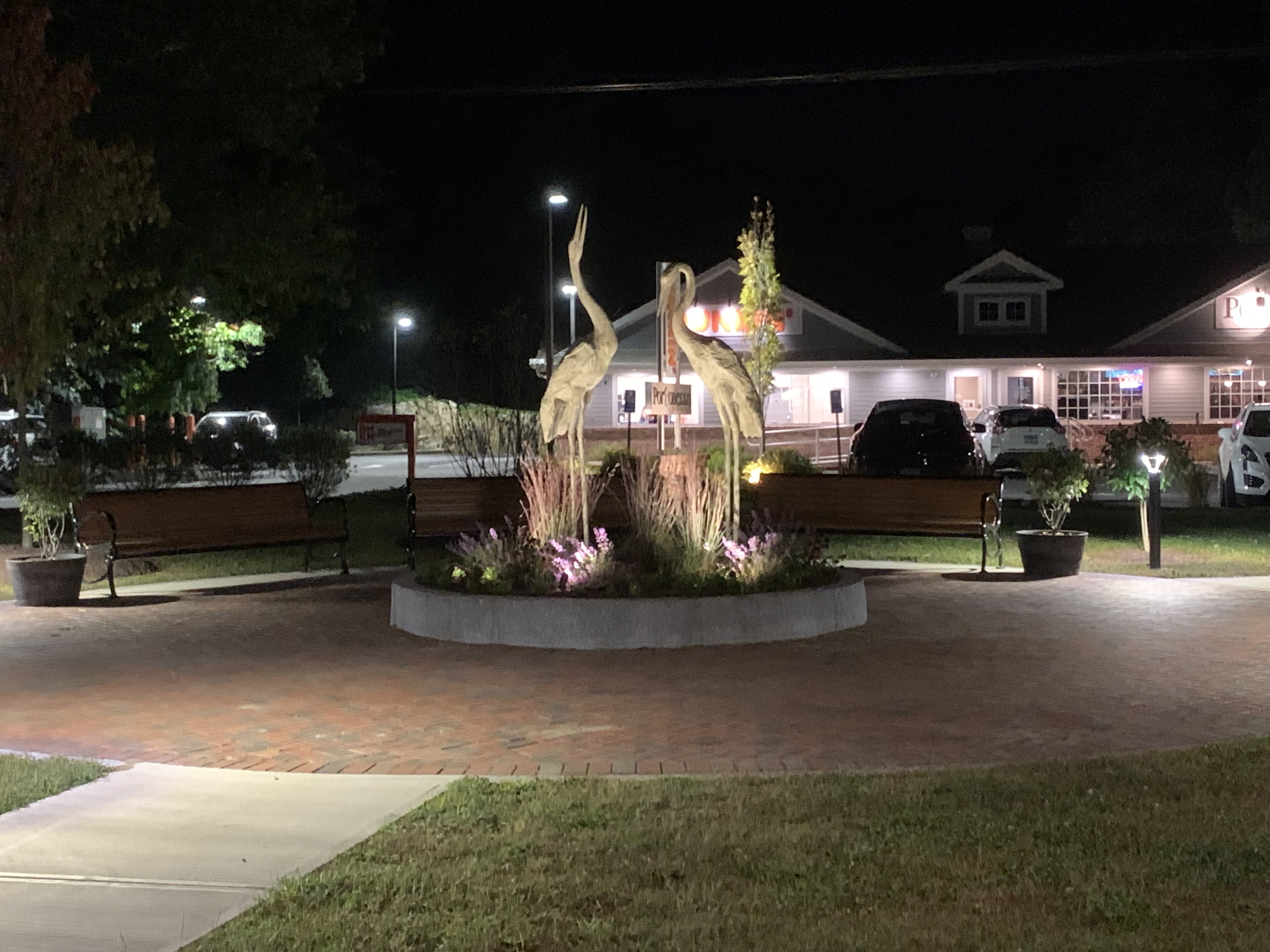
Pocket park in the Town Center District

For years, despite being a major economic center for retail in Fairfield County, Brookfield had lacked a walkable downtown area. Most of the large economic activity was centered on the southern portion of Federal Road near Danbury. In 2016, construction began on a project known as "Brookfield Village", which will create a downtown district consisting of sidewalks, a pocket park, street lamps, and parallel parking. Dozens of retail storefronts and residential apartment buildings (more than 150 units) are also being developed in this area, which has gained attention from retailers and will promote further development in the area. In conjunction with other retail developments on Federal Road and with the completion of Phase I of the newly revitalized district, many new restaurants, stores and boutiques have recently opened in the Town Center District.

== Community and points of interest ==
=== Arts and culture ===
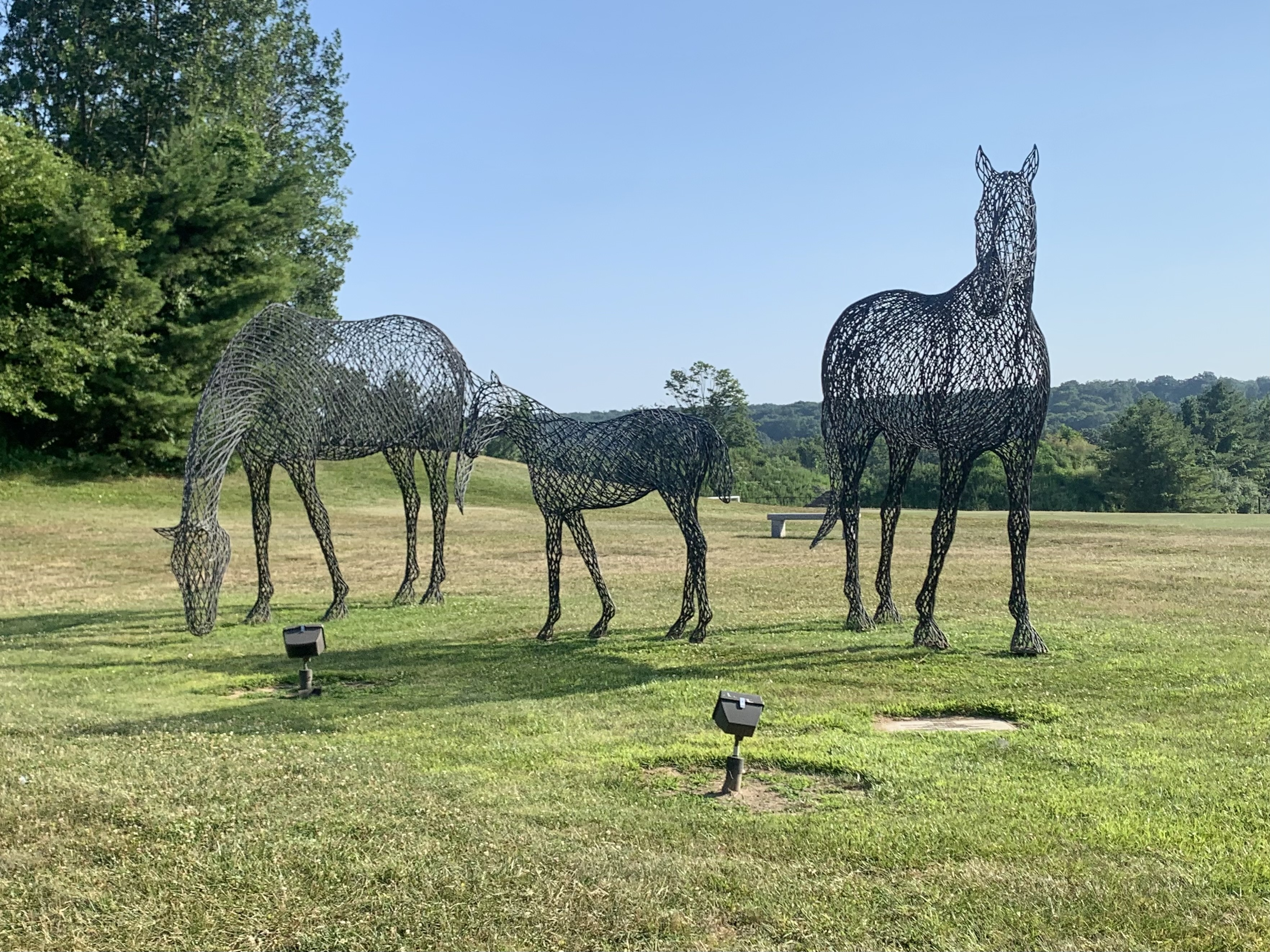
Sculptures depicting a family of horses; (left to right) mare, foal and stallion. Located at the entrance to the Brookfield Municipal Center and Town Park

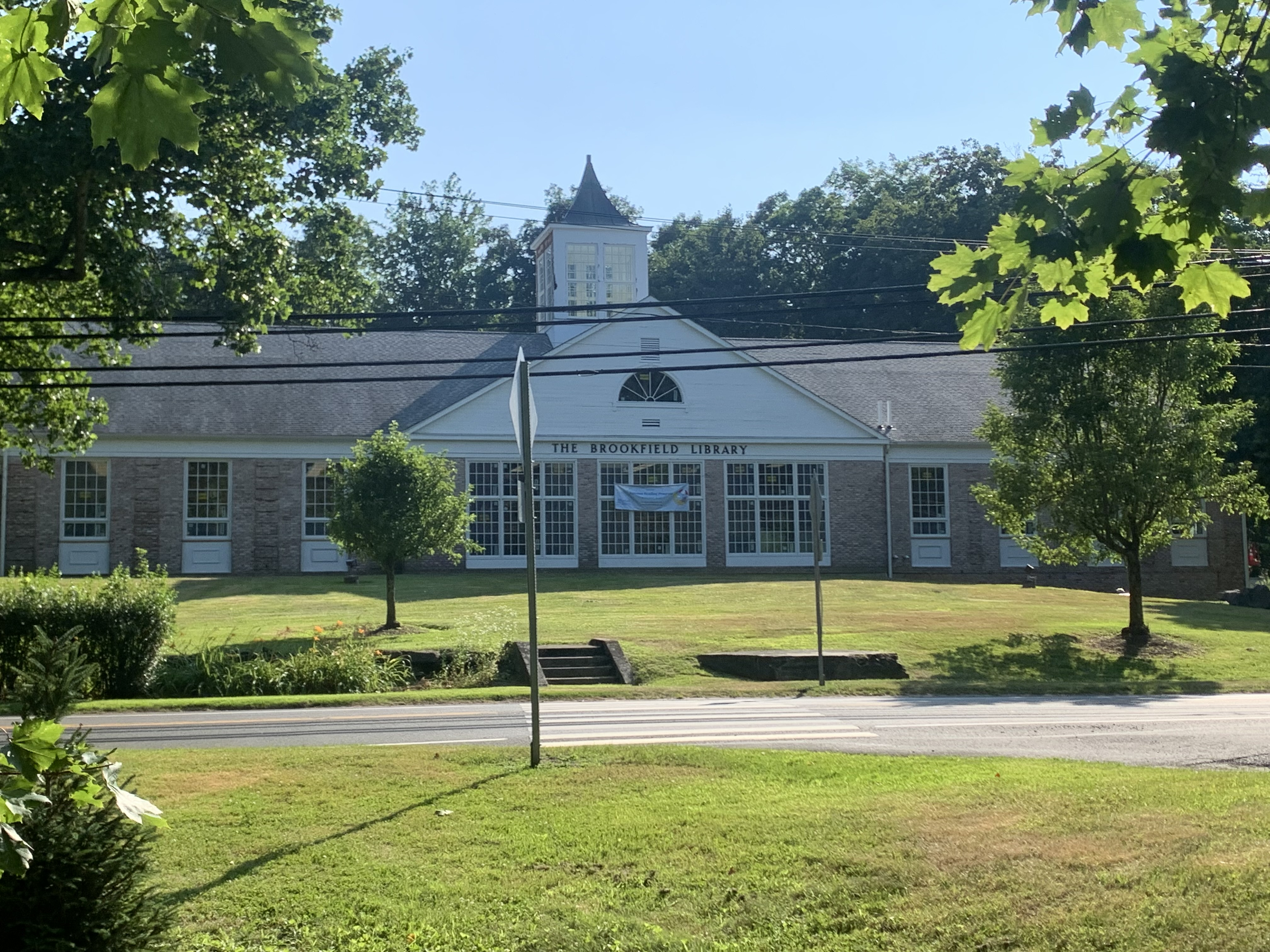
The Brookfield Library, as seen from the entrance to Williams Park

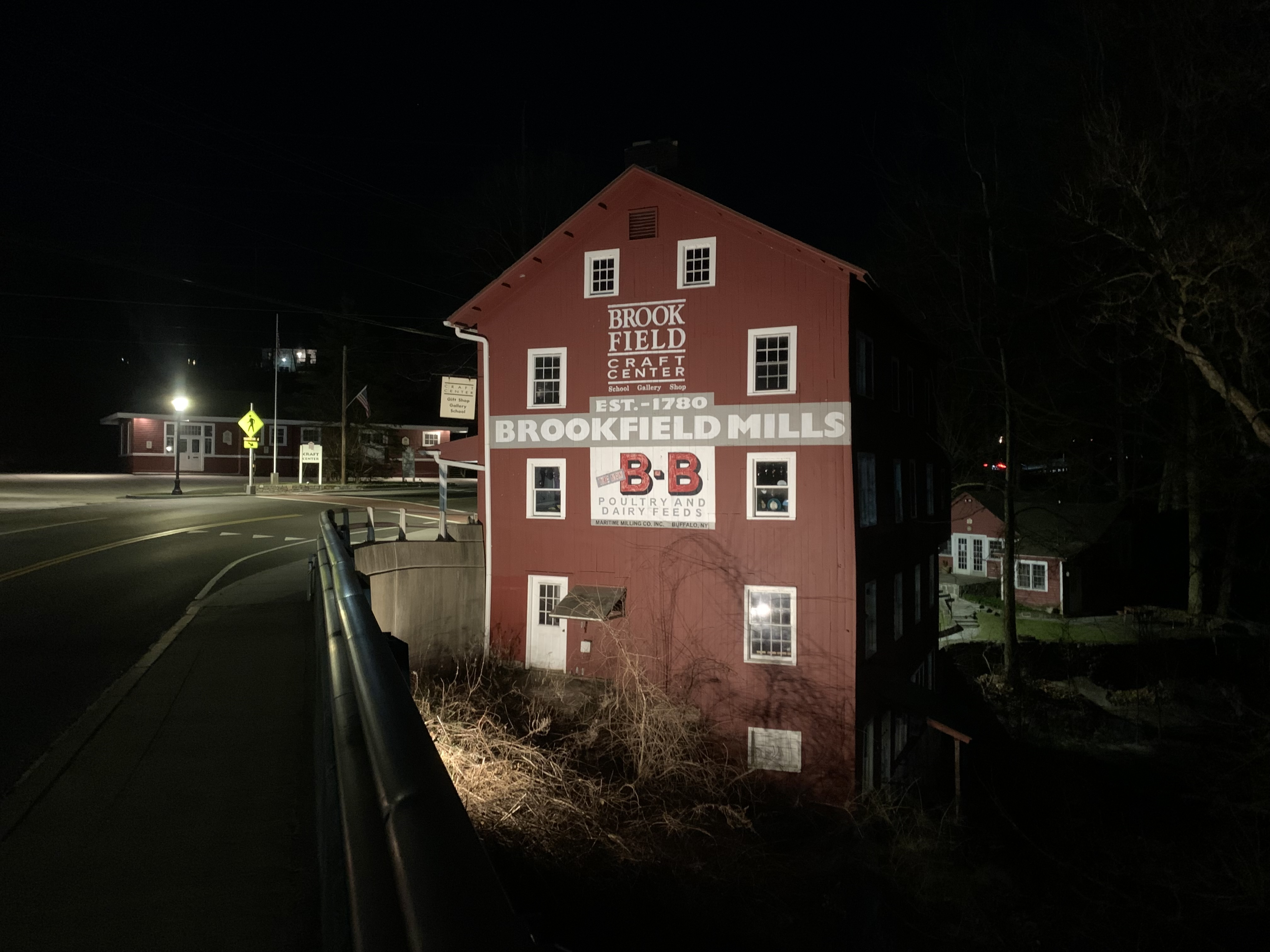
Brookfield Craft Center campus at night

- Brookfield Craft Center – a fine art gallery and educational center that brings arts and craftsmanship to people of all ages. Located in the former Brookfield Train Station and Brookfield Mills mill house.
- Brookfield Museum and Historical Society – founded in 1968, a museum and archive pertaining to the history of Brookfield and the New York and New England Region as a whole.
- Brookfield Public Library – located within the Brookfield Center Historic District. It is part of Bibliomation, a state-wide library consortium utilizing Evergreen in Connecticut which allows all involved libraries to share their resources, vastly increasing their collection sizes. The library was established in 1951 as the Joyce Memorial Library in the old Town Hall building on Whisconier Road using a $7,000 bequest left by Brookfield resident Daniel Clarke Joyce in 1929 to establish a library in Brookfield. The current library was constructed in 1975, and is 9,600 square feet. At this time, the former "Joyce Memorial Library" was renamed "The Brookfield Library". Several proposals have been made to construct a new library in Brookfield, due to the significant increase in population since 1975 when the current facility was constructed. In 2002, the Library Board of Trustees began the planning stage for a new library, and in 2009, a one million dollar state grant was awarded for the construction of a new library. A referendum was held in February 2018 over whether or not to begin construction on a 36,000 square foot library at a cost of 14.7 million dollars, although the motion did not pass. The Library Committee is now revising the plan, with hopes to bring a revised plan to referendum.
- Brookfield Theatre for the Arts – a theatre where community productions of various plays are held. The theatre building is part of the former Curtis School for Boys, an all-boys boarding school which closed in 1943.
- DiGrazia Vineyards is one of the three wineries in Fairfield County that are part of the Connecticut Wine Trail.

=== Lakes ===
- Candlewood Lake – the largest lake in Connecticut, Candlewood spans five towns and forms the western border of Brookfield.
- Lake Lillinonah – the second largest lake in Connecticut, spanning six towns. The lake was formed by the construction of the Shepaug Dam in 1955.

=== Parks and beaches ===
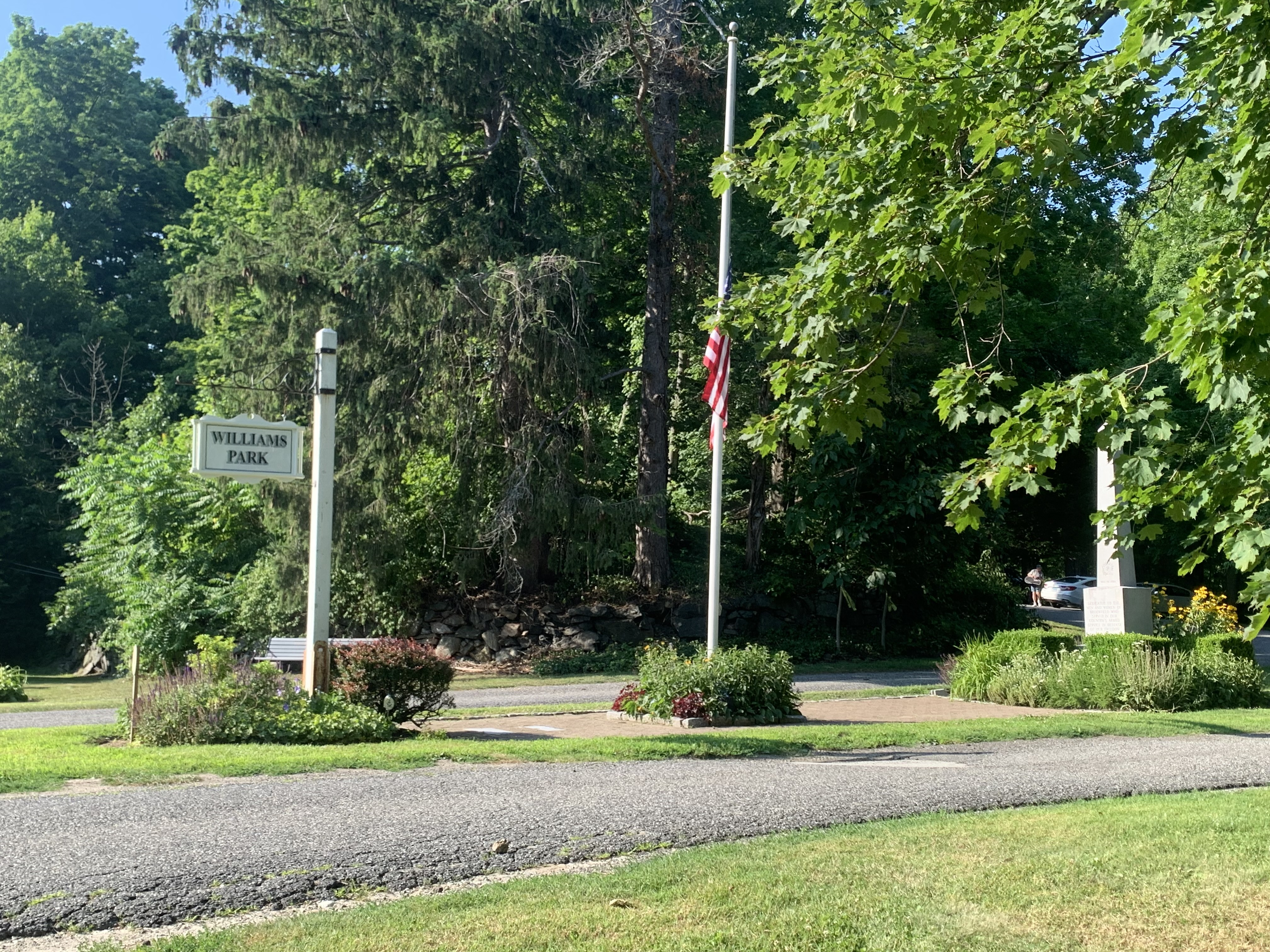
Entrance to Williams Park

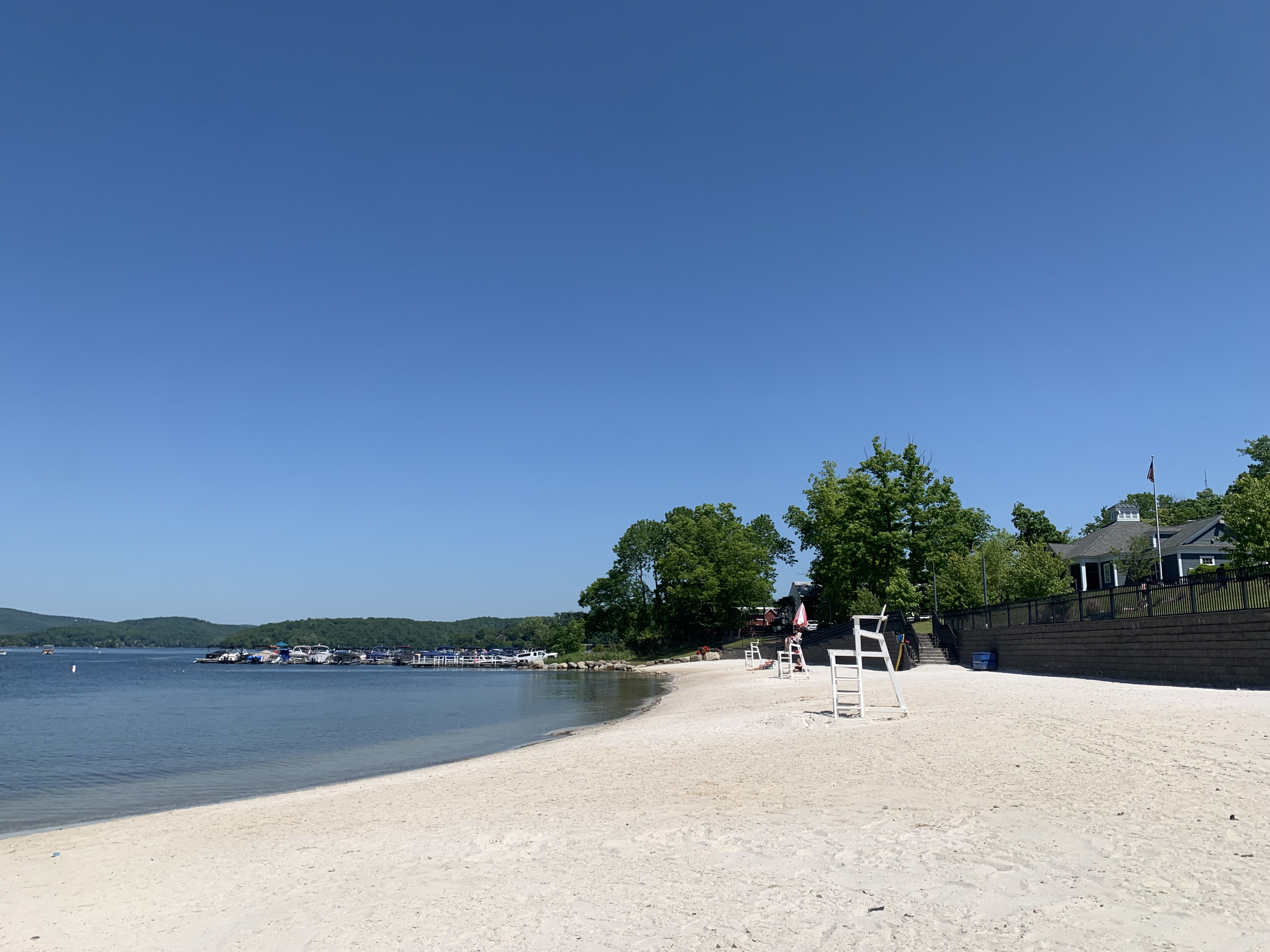
Brookfield Town Beach (Candlewood Lake)

- Arthur A. Harris Linear Park – a trail located alongside the Brookfield Municipal Center, connecting the property to the Still River Greenway.
- Birch Rocks Trails Preserve – located at 40A Obtuse Road North, the park consists of 2.5 miles of hiking trails through 175 protected acres of wooded land.
- Brookfield Municipal Center – located on Pocono Road, location of local government offices such as the Town Hall and Police Headquarters. Also home to the Brookfield Town Park, which is Brookfield's flagship park consisting of a large playground, baseball diamond, pickleball courts and soccer fields. Also the location of the Brookfield Bandstand, an outdoor music pavilion where concerts and shows are held in the summer.
- Brookfield Nature Center – consists of 16 acres owned by the Town of Brookfield and is managed by the Brookfield Conservation Commission. The land has a striking mix of old fields, upland woods with strands of Spruce mixed with large specimen trees of Tulip and White Oak. Merwin Brook cuts across the northwest corner of the property. The brook flows through a wooded wetland with white ash, elm, and red maple trees around it. The grassland fields are a nesting site of Bobolinks and other ground nesting birds. A careful mowing schedule is used to protect the eggs and chicks.
- Brookfield Town Beach – located on 460 Candlewood Lake Road, the facilities include swimming, basketball, sand volleyball courts, restrooms, changing facilities, BBQ grills and picnic tables. The beach also features a Lakeside Community Room which is available for reservations to host events up to 50 people. The beach is only open to residents of the Town of Brookfield and their guests for daily admission, although residents of the Town of Bethel are eligible to purchase season passes.
- Burr Farm Protected Open Space – a town-owned parcel of protected open space located at 23 Dingle Brook Road, comprising 116 acres divided into East and West parcels, along the now unused eastern end of Lake George Road.
- Cadigan Park – a park located on Candlewood Lake Road, containing turf football and lacrosse fields, lighted basketball and tennis courts, as well as walking/biking trails. Directly across the street from the Brookfield Town Beach.
- Eriksen Farm Open Space – a town-owned parcel of protected open space located at 8 Nabby Road, comprising 20 acres of protected open fields for walking and biking.
- Gurski Farm Protected Open Space – a town-owned parcel of protected open space that connects into Williams Park via trail.
- Happy Landings Protected Open Space – a town-owned parcel of 55 protected acres of open fields and approximately 19 acres of woodland open space located along Whisconier Road (Route 25), consists of containing historic barns, wells and windmills.
- Lillinonah Woods – located at 54 Obutse Rocks Road, the park is situated on 68 acres of land and connects to Lake Lillinonah. This park offers fishing (by permit), hiking trails, picnic tables and parking. A small beach is also located on-site.
- Old Bridge Sanctuary – located at 57 Old Bridge Road, a park situated on 25 acres that offers hiking trails and parking.
- Still River Greenway – a paved trail through the woods used for walking and biking that connects the Brookfield Municipal Center to Brookfield Town Center. The greenway is part of a planned network that will eventually connect New Milford to Norwalk via pedestrian trails.
- Whalen Pond – located on 3 Broadview Road, a pond that is accessible for ice skating during the wintertime.
- Williams Park – a trail for walking and biking through the woods, also containing public clay tennis courts. Entrance is across the street from the Brookfield Library.

=== Private membership/golf clubs ===
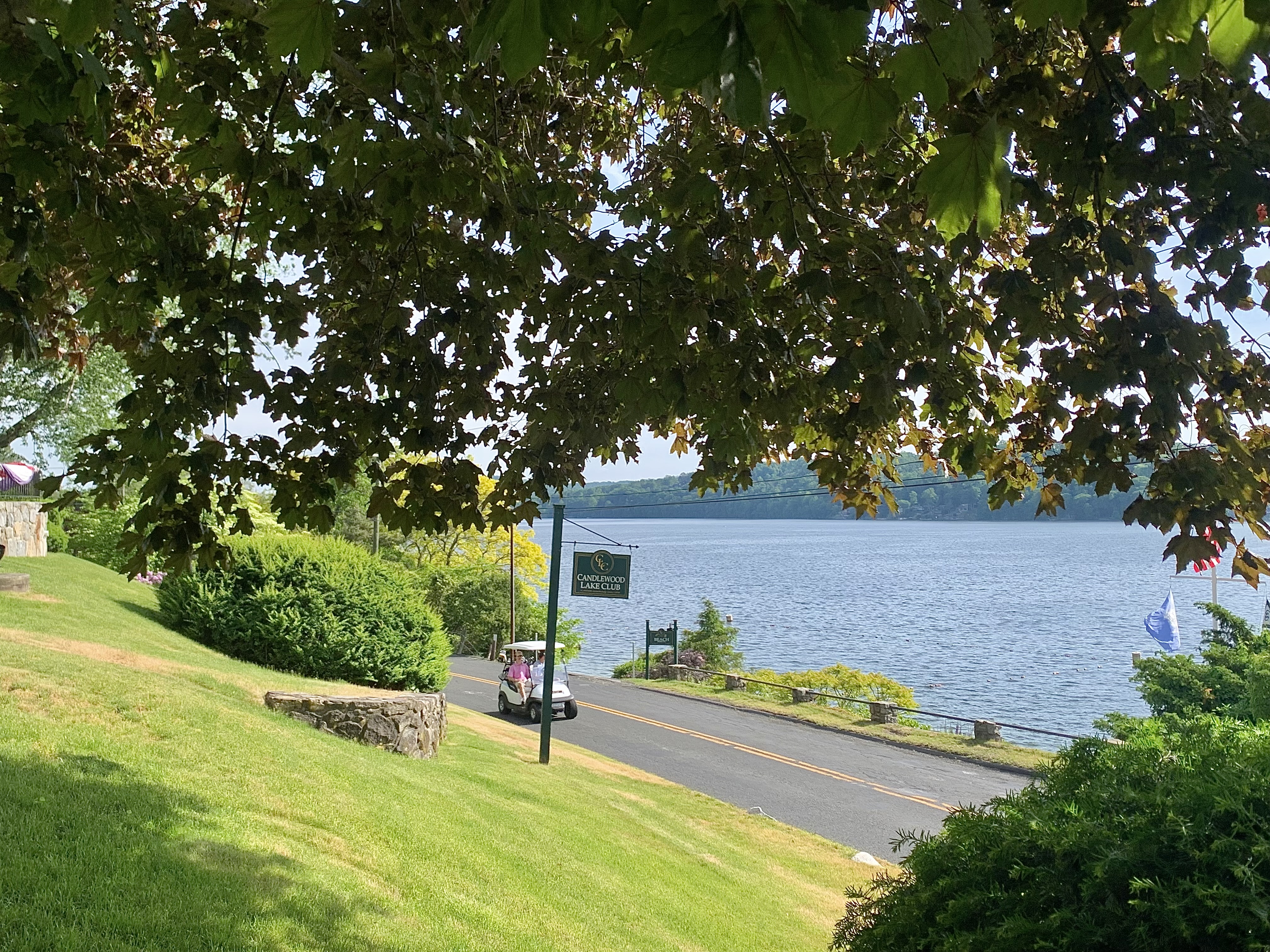
View of Candlewood Lake from the entrance to Candlewood Lake Club

- Candlewood Lake Club – a private community on Candlewood Lake that encompasses land and properties in both Brookfield and adjoining New Milford. It includes a country club with an 9-hole golf course, tennis courts, swimming pools and a clubhouse. Real estate ownership within the community requires residents to pay membership fees to the club and homeowner association.
- Candlewood Shores Clubhouse – a facility open to members of the Candlewood Shores Homeowner's Association, which includes private beaches and recreation centers.
- Sunset Hill Golf Club – a public, 9-hole golf course designed by Gene Sarazen in 1936.

== Rankings ==
Known as an affluent Fairfield County suburb, Brookfield has regularly placed high in various rankings. Brookfield was selected as the best small town in Connecticut by Money magazine in 2013. It was selected as the 26th best town to live in nationwide by Money.com in 2013. In 2017, MarketWatch ranked the Greater Danbury area as the 10th most expensive place to raise a family in the United States. Brookfield Public Schools are frequently ranked as one of the best school districts in Connecticut. Brookfield is also frequently ranked as one of the safest towns in Connecticut, due to its extremely low crime rates. In 2015, Connecticut Magazine rated Brookfield as one of the best among towns in Connecticut with median home values over $325,000. The rating considers education, crime, economy, community engagement, and culture/leisure.

== Notable people ==
Partially due to Brookfield's close proximity to New York City, Brookfield has seen many notable residents ranging from famous golfer Gene Sarazen to Connecticut's 87th governor Jodi Rell. Many finance and business executives also reside in Brookfield, due to the centralization of investment firms and hedge funds in Fairfield County, as well as many Fortune 500 companies.

== In popular culture ==
- In the 2010 film All Good Things, starring Ryan Gosling and Kirsten Dunst, several scenes used a Brookfield lake house on Lake Lillinonah as the set.
- The 2021 movie The Conjuring: The Devil Made Me Do It is based on the 1981 trial of Arne Cheyenne Johnson. This was the first murder case in all of Brookfield's history.
- Scenes from the 1968 movie Rachel, Rachel were filmed in Brookfield.
- The 1988–1989 TV series Michaels' Movie Madness was shot in Brookfield.
- The short film Innocence was mostly filmed in Brookfield.
- In the 1941 film The Lady Eve, starring Henry Fonda and Barbara Stanwyck, Fonda's character hosts lavish parties in a fictional town called Bridgefield, Connecticut, right outside of New York. This fictional town is based on either the town of Brookfield, Ridgefield or Bridgewater, as they have similar sounding names and fit this demographic at the time.
- Arcadia Publishing created an Images of America book detailing the History of Brookfield, composed by Marilyn S. Whittlesey.
- Annals of Brookfield, Fairfield County, Connecticut was written by Emily C. Hawley, and published in 1929.

== Transportation ==
=== Highways ===
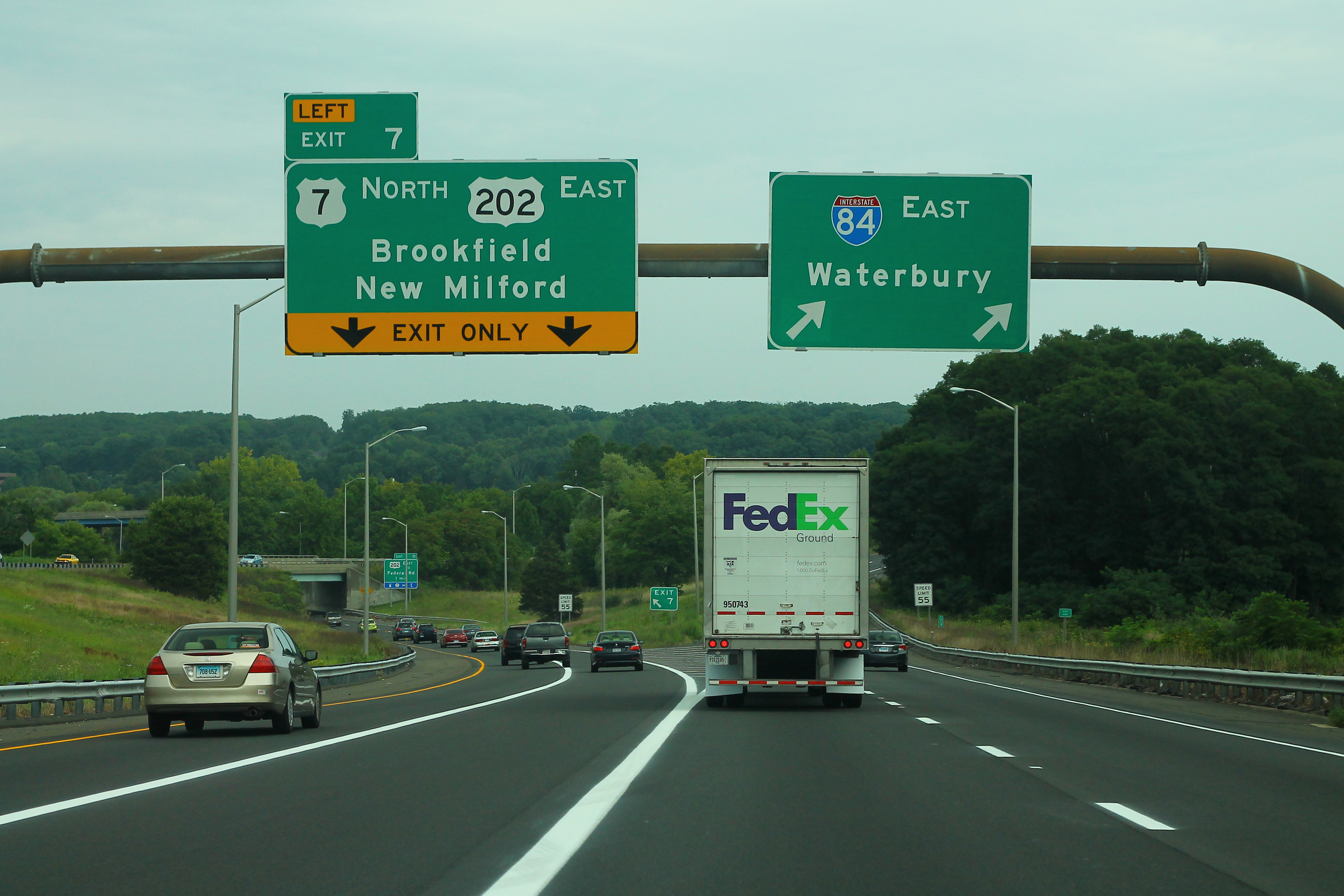
Exit 7 on Interstate 84 (eastbound)

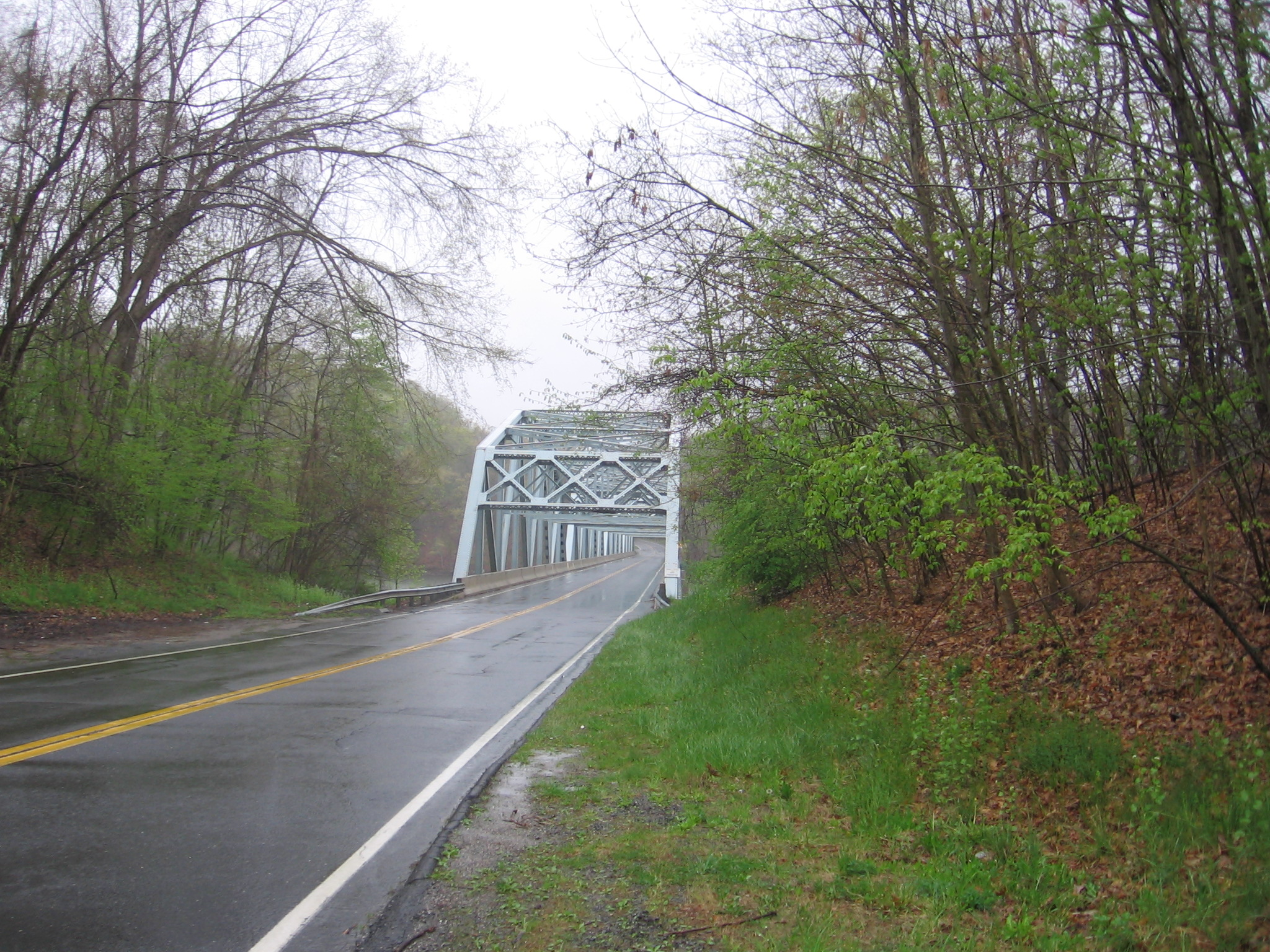
The Southville Bridge, part of Route 133

Interstate 84 and U.S. Route 7 are the main highways in Brookfield. From the South, US 7 and US 202 joins Interstate 84 near Danbury. To the South, US 7 connects to Route 15 (Merritt Parkway) and Interstate 95 in Norwalk. US 202 then splits from US 7, and runs parallel north through town before reconnecting with US 7 near the New Milford border. For many years, US 7 and US 202 ran concurrently through Brookfield but, after decades of discussion and planning, the US 7 Bypass officially opened in November 2009. The Governor of Connecticut at the time was Jodi Rell (R), a Brookfield resident.

Route 133 connects Brookfield to its eastern neighbor Bridgewater over the iconic Southville Bridge, which spans the Housatonic River. Route 25 also connects Brookfield with Newtown and its Hawleyville neighborhood to the southeast, passing by Interstate 84 and terminating at US 6. Interstate 84 passes through the southern tip of Brookfield, but is most directly accessible through Hawleyville.

Brookfield is located along U.S. Bicycle Route 7, which runs from Norwalk, Connecticut, to the border between Vermont and Quebec.

=== Buses ===
The town is part of the "4 Route", "7 Route" and "New Milford Loop", which are operated by Housatonic Area Regional Transit (HART). A park and ride is located at 67 White Turkey Road Extension, and offers connections to nearby bus and train stations as well as nearby airports. HART operates a direct shuttle for commuters between the park and ride and Brewster station on Weekdays from 5 a.m. to 10 p.m.

=== Railroad ===
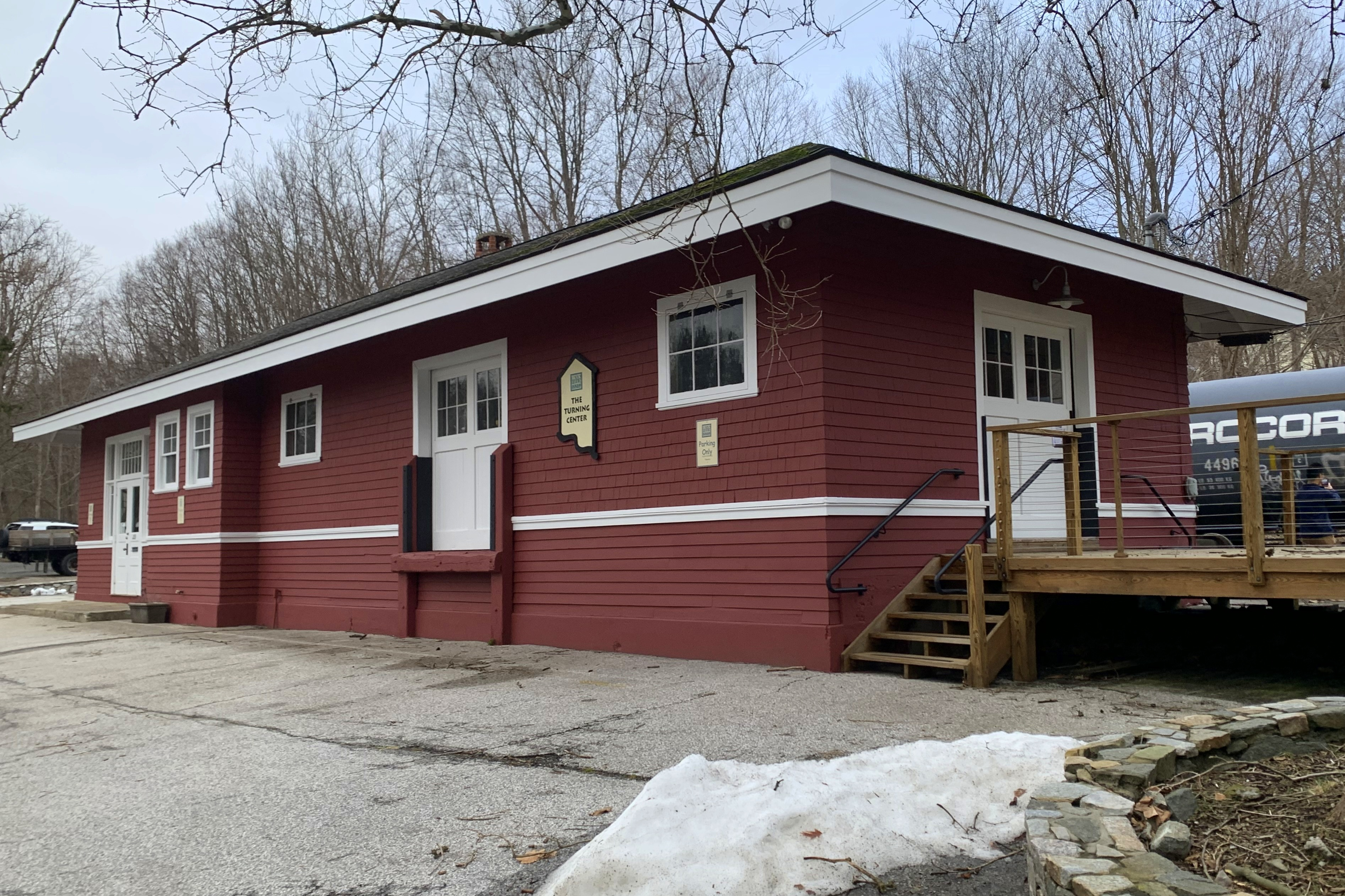
Former Brookfield train station; the building is now part of the Brookfield Craft Center campus

Until 1971, the New York, New Haven and Hartford Railroad (later the Penn Central Railroad) operated commuter service between Grand Central Terminal and Pittsfield, Massachusetts, which included a stop in Brookfield. Brookfield's station building ceased to operate as a station in 1971 when service ended. There was also a station on Stony Hill Road known as Brookfield Junction, which closed in 1925.

Proposals have been made to extend the New Haven Line's Danbury Branch to New Milford, which would include a Brookfield Metro-North station. The Danbury Branch provides commuter rail service between Danbury, to South Norwalk, Stamford, and Grand Central Terminal in New York City. The tracks north of Danbury are currently used by the Housatonic Railroad for freight service. This extension would give Brookfield's significant population of commuters another way to travel to Lower Fairfield County and New York City, since they must currently leave from the nearby Danbury station or other stations along the New Haven or Harlem Lines, such as Brewster station (located 12 miles from Brookfield).

=== Airports ===
The closest public airport to Brookfield is Danbury Municipal Airport, being located in neighboring Danbury. Brookfield is within close proximity of several airports with commercial service, including Westchester County Airport, Bradley International Airport, Tweed New Haven Airport and NYC airports of the Port Authority of New York and New Jersey.

== Emergency services ==
=== Fire Department and EMS ===
The town of Brookfield has two volunteer fire companies in town staffing three stations, with the headquarters for the Brookfield Volunteer Fire Company being at 92 Pocono Road the Center Company at 6 Obtuse Hill Road and the Brookfield Volunteer Fire Department Candlewood Company at 18 Bayview Drive The department was founded in 1934, and is composed entirely of volunteers.

=== Police Department ===
The Brookfield Police Department Headquarters is located at 63 Silvermine Road adjacent to the Brookfield Municipal Center. The department was established on July 1, 1977, and as of 2017, consists of 34 full-time officers, 6 special officers and 12 full and part-time civilian personnel. The Department Command Staff consists of the chief of police, a major and a captain. There is a Patrol Division, a Detective Division, including a youth officer and two school resource officers, and part-time SCUBA Team, Accident Investigation Team, tactical response technicians with the Danbury Police Department, and part-time evidence technicians. Brookfield has plans to expand the current police headquarters, citing a growth in the population served, as well as the size of the police force.

== Media ==
- WINE-AM 940; 1,000 watts; Portuguese, owned by International Church of the Grace of God, Inc.
- WRKI-FM 95.1; 50,000 watts; the station has a "mainstream rock" format and covers Fairfield, Litchfield, New Haven Counties in Connecticut and Putnam, Dutchess, Westchester Counties in New York.
- The News-Times is the most prominent newspaper serving the Greater Danbury area, and reports on local news in Brookfield.The Brookfield Daily Voice and The Brookfield Patch are the two most prominent local online newspapers.
- Brookfield's public-access channels are channels 162 (education) and 164 (community), and are made available by Charter Spectrum.
- News 12 Connecticut is the local cable news station serving Fairfield County, and covers local news in Brookfield. The town is part of the New York City media market for news and entertainment, and most networks for the Hartford-New Haven market are provided alongside New York TV stations.

== See also ==
- History of Brookfield, Connecticut
