= Pond Mountain =

Mountain in New Fairfield, Connecticut

- Pond Mountain with Squantz Pond in the foreground

Highest point
- Elevation: 1,198 ft (365 m)
- Coordinates: 41.5102670°N 73.4896954°W

Geography
- Location within Connecticut
- Country: United States
- State: Connecticut
- Planning Region: Western Connecticut Planning Region

Pond Mountain is a summit in New Fairfield, Connecticut. It is located within the confines of Pootatuck State Forest.

Pond Mountain was originally part of the lands of the Schaghiticoke tribe. It was an area of significance during the sachemship of Squantz, leader of the Potatuck until his death circa 1725. Council Rock, located on Pond Mountain, was an important vantage point and meeting place for the tribe.

Pond Mountain and Council Rock are accessible by hikers from Squantz Pond State Park.
