= Golden Hill Paugussett Indian Nation =

State-recognized Native American tribe in Connecticut, United States

- Abbreviation: GHPIN
- Type: state-recognized tribe
- Headquarters: Colchester, Connecticut
- Members: 100
- Official language: English
- Clan Mother: Shoran Waupatukuay Piper
- Website: paugussett.com
- Formerly called: Golden Hill Paugussett Tribe

The Golden Hill Paugussett Nation is a state-recognized Native American tribe in Connecticut. Granted reservations in a number of towns in the 17th century, their land base was whittled away until they were forced to reacquire a small amount of territory in the 19th century. Today they retain a state-recognized reservation in the town of Trumbull, and have an additional reservation acquired in 1978 and 1980 in Colchester, Connecticut.

They descend from the historic Paugussett, an Algonguian-speaking nation who historically occupied much of western Connecticut prior to the arrival of European colonists. They are among the five tribes recognized by the state. They were denied federal recognition in 2004.

== Membership ==
The 100-member tribe lives primarily in urban areas of Southwestern Connecticut due to the minuscule size of its 1/4-acre (0.0010 km^{2}) reserve in the Nichols section of Trumbull, Connecticut. Several members presently reside in Colchester, Connecticut, where the tribe has a second 106-acre (0.43 km^{2}) reservation.

In 2009, a state court dismissed a challenge to the tribe's status as Indians, refusing to eject members of the Golden Hill Paugussett Tribe from reservations in Trumbull and Colchester.

== History ==
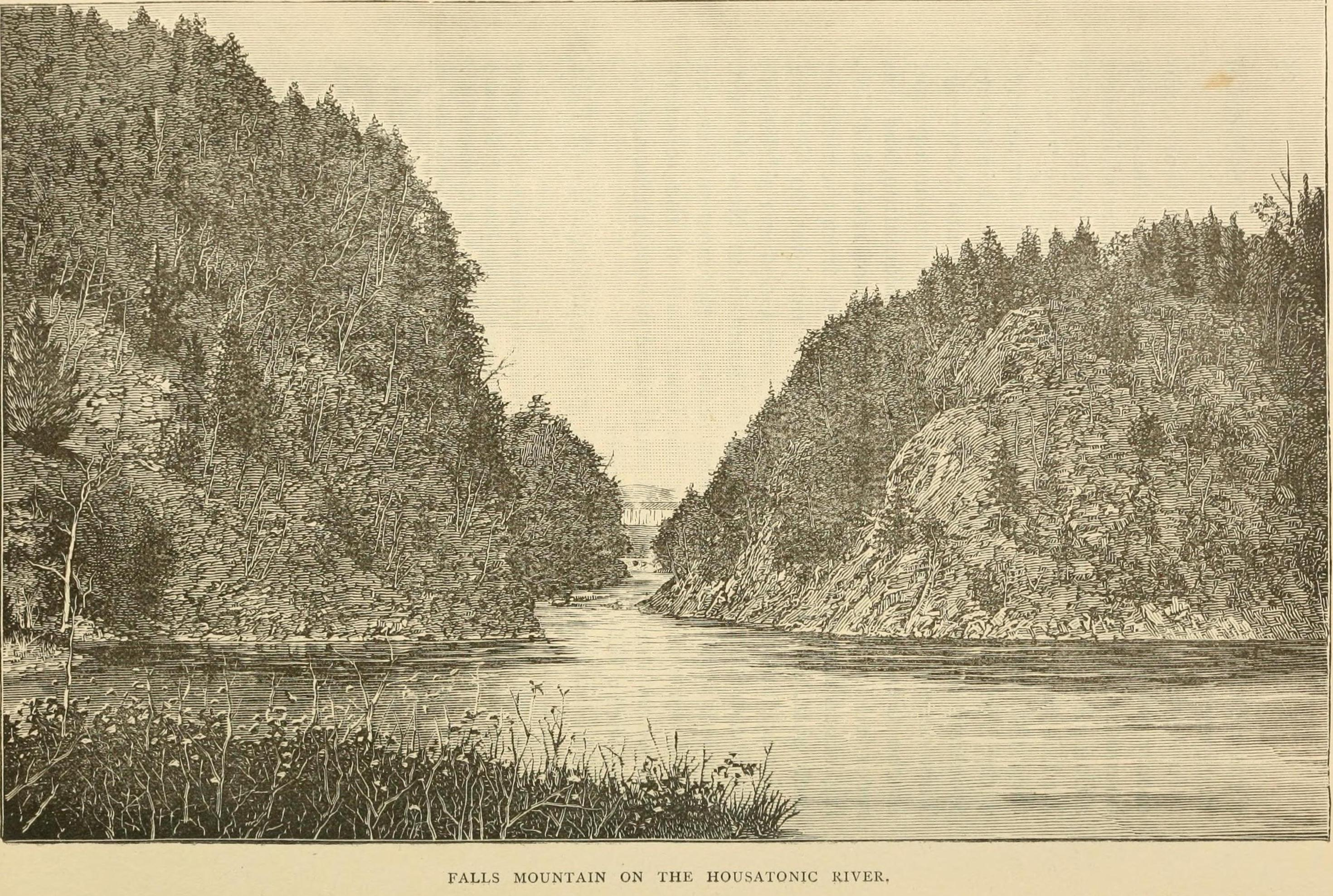
Falls Mountain gorge on the Housatonic River, site of a seventeenth-century Paugussett fishing village/site.

While the history of the Paugusset people began long before the European encounter, the early written records are European accounts. They likely spoke an Eastern Algonquian language. Neighboring tribes included the Quinnipiack, Wampano, Unkechaug, Naugatuck, Mattabesic, and Schaghticoke. Quiripi has been extinct since at least the early 1800s.

Historically, the Paugussett occupied a region from present-day Norwalk to West Haven, and from Long Island Sound inland for as far as they could navigate by canoe on the Housatonic and Naugatuck rivers.

The tribe was made up of four primary sub-groups, the Paugussett Proper in what is present-day Milford, Derby and Shelton; the Pequonnock, along the coast; the Potatuck in Newtown, Woodbury and Southbury; and the Weantinock in New Milford. They had a farming and fishing culture. The women cultivated varieties of staple crops: corn, beans, and squash, and tobacco, which was used for ritual purposes. The men fished in both fresh and salt water. The size of midden shell heaps along the coast and the amount of cleared land attested to both a long period of occupation and a high degree of social organization among the people.

=== Encroachment by settlers ===
While the Paugusset did not have early direct contact with Europeans, they came in contact with other Native Americans who did, and were exposed to the smallpox epidemic in 1633–35, which caused many deaths. They learned of the English and allies' war against the Pequot in 1637, with the defeat of that nation. English settlers first arrived in Paugussett lands in 1638–39, establishing settlements in New Haven, Guilford, Milford, Stratford and Fairfield.

=== Golden Hill and Turkey Hill ===
Within a few years, the colonists had wrested away from the Paugussett the vast majority of their lands. Colonists set aside a reservation in 1639 at Golden Hill, the site of a spring sacred to the tribe, in present-day Bridgeport. They established another reservation at Turkey Hill in present-day Derby.

In 1802, the state-appointed tribal overseer of Paugusset lands sold Golden Hill. State officials created a replacement reservation at Turkey Meadows in Trumbull in 1841, but sold it off in 1854. The last of Turkey Hill was also sold by the state in 1826, claiming it was for the native people's "own benefit".

=== Ethiope or Liberia ===
According to Bridgeport City Historian Charles Brilvitch's history of the Golden Hill tribe, beginning in the 1820s a number of Paugussett, under the leadership of Joel Freeman, a Turkey Hill Indian from Derby, relocated to Bridgeport. They settled in the city's South End. The area became known as Ethiope or Liberia. While this community consisted substantially of residents who identified as Paugussett, it included Natives from the Mahican, Shinnecock, Nehantic, and Munsee-Delaware nations as well. Freeman was followed by two of his sisters, Mary and Eliza, who built houses in 1848 that are still standing. They have been listed in the National Register of Historic Places.

During the antebellum period, the Paugussett and other Native Americans achieved a substantial degree of economic success. Many of the men worked on whaling ships and West Indies trading vessels, while many women residents worked as cooks and waitstaff on the steamboats plying Long Island Sound and the Hudson River. Two churches, a Masonic lodge, resort hotel, school and other community institutions were built in the village.

Only one individual named "Joel Freeman" was recorded in Census and vital records of the state of Connecticut during this period. Nevertheless, the Bureau of Indian Affairs disputed whether the man who led the Ethiope-Liberia community was the same individual listed as a signatory on Turkey Hill Indian deeds. Because the National Register of Historic Places nomination for the Mary and Eliza Freeman Houses identified the builders as African Americans, the BIA disputed whether the sisters and Joel Freeman could be considered members of the Paugusset community. However, Charles Brilvitch, who ironically had authored the 1998 nomination, maintains that his African American identification was merely a mistaken attempt to interpret the term "coloured" used in documents of the period

The confusion about cultural identification as Native Americans has affected other communities that have worked to demonstrate cultural continuity. Native American nations were used to absorbing people of other ethnicities and intermarried with neighbors. There has been disagreement among groups over an interpretation of the term "mulatto," which has a primary association of African-European mixed race but has frequently been applied to other people of colour.

=== Restoration of the land base ===
Map of the Golden Hill Paugussett Indian Nation reservation.

Around 1857 William Sherman (1825–1886), a whaler by trade withdrew from the Liberia community and settled in the village of Nichols Farms in the Town of Trumbull, Connecticut, the site of the 1841-54 Turkey Meadows reservation. In 1875, he purchased a quarter-acre plot of land that contained a Paugussett burial ground; he used funds from the Golden Hill Tribal Fund to construct a house on it. He is referred to in local histories of the 1880s as the chief of the tribe. Prior to his death in 1886, Sherman turned the property over to the state overseer in trust for the Golden Hill tribe. The land was accepted by the State of Connecticut in that year as an official reservation.

Subsequently, his son George Sherman (b. 1871) took over the leadership of the Golden Hill people; he lived on the reservation and led the people until his death in 1938. He was succeeded by his son Edward (1896–1974), who was known as "Chief Black Hawk." Meanwhile, Edward's sister, Ethel (1893–1993), was installed in 1933 as "Chieftess Rising Star". Ethel was active in the Pan-Indian movement and was a staunch advocate of Indian rights, fighting many battles in the courts of law and public opinion. She named her son Aurelius H. Piper (1916–2008) as "Chief Big Eagle" in 1959. Following the death of Chief Black Hawk in 1974, Piper (Chief Big Eagle) assumed full leadership of the tribe and took up residency on the Trumbull reservation. He obtained grants to purchase land in Colchester, Connecticut for the community in 1978 and 1980. This land was granted formal reservation status by the state legislature in 1981.

=== Leadership ===
On May 1, 1991, due to advancing age, Chief Big Eagle named his son, Aurelius H. Piper, Jr. (1945–2021), as Hereditary Chief of the Golden Hill Tribe. Known as Chief Quiet Hawk, Piper was an ex-Marine and former social worker who was then serving as executive director of American Indians for Development, Inc. Immediately upon assuming leadership he launched the Golden Hill Indian Development Corporation, with the purpose of economic development of the reservation properties for the benefit of the tribal membership.

In September, 1992, Quiet Hawk filed a lawsuit to reclaim lands taken from the tribe in violation of the federal Nonintercourse Act. The tribe at first sought to reclaim the 12-acre Nimrod Lot and the 8-acre Rocky Hill Lot in the city of Bridgeport, both sold off by the State of Connecticut in 1802 without the stipulated approval of both houses of Congress. In November, 1992, he advanced the claim to include the 19 3/4-acre Turkey Meadows Reservation in Trumbull. Concurrently, the tribe sued for the remainder of the 80-acre Golden Hill Reservation in Bridgeport. Within a few short weeks historic reservation lands in the towns of Milford, Orange, Woodbridge, Stratford, and Shelton were added; intent was made known to press claims in 24 state municipalities, comprising $44 billion worth of property and 640,000 defendants.

An overriding priority of Chief Quiet Hawk's administration was the quest for federal recognition. A grant for this purpose was obtained from the Department of Housing and Urban Development in 1992. Another priority was to utilize modern technology to facilitate interaction among tribal members and to strengthen community bonds and spiritual focus.

Chief Quiet Hawk died at age 76 on April 26, 2021. A vote of the tribal membership affirmed his succession by his brother Aureliuse H. Piper III, oldest surviving son of Chief Big Eagle, on November 14, 2021. Aureliuse is known as Chief Bear Eagle. He resides on the Colchester reservation.

=== Challenge over cigarette sales ===
In 1993 the tribe made national headlines when it opened a tax-free cigarette shop on the Colchester reservation, asserting its sovereignty in selling the product without taking taxes. An armed standoff with state police ensued that ended without violence when Chief Moon Face Bear (Kenneth Piper) agreed to close the shop. In the resulting state court case, the court ruled in State v. Piper, No. CR21-57349 (May 3, 1996), that the tribe did not have exemption from the state requirement to collect taxes on sales of cigarettes as it was not federally recognized.

== Quest for federal recognition ==
Chief Big Eagle first submitted a request to the BIA in 1982 seeking federal recognition of the Golden Hill Paugussett tribe. That request was not acted on or further pursued by the BIA. Early in 1990 Chief Big Eagle appointed Chief Quiet Hawk to pursue the quest for federal recognition and also to pursue the land claims in the state of Connecticut.

Opposition to federal recognition came from local residents who were opposed to proposed Golden Hill casino development in Bridgeport. Some scholars have attributed opposition to anti-Indigenous and anti-Black racism, noting the mixed-race heritage of many Golden Hill Paugussetts.

In a final determination in 1996, the Bureau of Indian Affairs denied recognition to the Golden Hill Paugussett. The tribe appealed under BIA provisions and submitted additional historic and genealogical documentation. They were denied federal recognition in 2004. Since the legislative changes that have enabled federally recognized tribes to establish gambling casinos on their lands, some tribes have gained significant revenue for welfare, education, and development from gambling revenues, including two in Connecticut.

In 2015, the Bureau of Indian Affairs revised the acknowledgment criteria, requiring petitioners to prove continuity only back to 1900 (rather than to the time of first contact) and accepting state recognition and the existence of tribal reservations as evidence of a continuing government-to-government relationship. Seeing that this would virtually guarantee recognition of the Paugussett and other state tribes, the Connecticut congressional delegation insisted on the insertion of a clause stipulating that tribes which have previously been denied federal recognition could not re-petition. In 2017, the Golden Hill Paugussett announced their intention to contest the "no second chance" rule as unconstitutional and said that they were working on another application for federal recognition.

== State opposition to federal recognition ==
While the state has gained considerable revenues from its share of income generated by the two major established casino resorts, Connecticut officials have been opposed to recognition of additional tribes and addition of gambling sites in the state. State officials lobbied the BIA in opposition to recognition of the Golden Hill Paugussett.

The governor, Congressional delegation, and private property owners later mounted challenges and conducted lobbying to reverse the federal recognition granted to the Eastern Pequot Nation in 2002, and the Schaghticoke Tribal Nation in 2004. They succeeded in gaining a BIA review of both cases; after a change in political administrations, recognition of both tribes was revoked in 2005, actions without precedent.

== Land rights claims ==
Together with providing documentation and working to regain tribal status, the Paugusset filed land rights claims against the state, saying the state did not have the authority to manage or sell land on their behalf and had cost them the loss of substantial lands since colonial times. Lack of federal recognition has deprived them of automatic standing in such suits.

Initiated by Chief Big Eagle, the Paugussett originally had claimed legal rights to 700,000 acres (2,800 km^{2}) of land running from Orange/Woodbridge in New Haven County though Fairfield County to Greenwich and extending North into Eastern Litchfield County up to the Massachusetts border. The Paugusset have since dropped these large claims.

In 1992, Chief Quiet Hawk filed a lawsuit claiming 80 acres in Bridgeport, the site of Golden Hill, which the state had sold in 1802, as well as land in Trumbull and Orange. In 1993, the federal District Court judge Peter Dorsey concluded that Connecticut had violated the 1790 Non-Intercourse Act by selling Indian lands without the approval of the federal government. But he dismissed the case, pending resolution of the BIA's review of the Paugusset petition for federal recognition. The Second Circuit Court of Appeals overturned the dismissal in 1999. Citing other cases, it noted that criteria for an Indian group's pursuit of land claims were not necessarily the same as for federal recognition.

In 2006, a federal district court judge dismissed the Golden Hill Paugussett's 14-year-old lawsuit claiming lands in Orange, Trumbull and Bridgeport, based on the federal Bureau of Indian Affairs' rejection of the tribe's petition for federal recognition. The Golden Hill Paugusset had contended that, since they were a Native American nation, the state did not have the authority to deal with them on land sales or dispose of their land. Since the United States was formed, the federal government had reserved to itself authority over dealings with Native American nations and required approval by the Senate of any sale of Indian lands.

== Notable Golden Hill Paugusett people ==
- Aurelius H. Piper, Sr. (1916–2008), Chief Big Eagle - hereditary chief, died at age 92 in Trumbull. Beginning in the late 20th century, he encouraged revival of the Paugusset language. "It is a sacred obligation," says the Golden Hill Paugussett Chief, Big Eagle. "Indian people must keep their languages alive. If the language is not spoken, it must be made to live again."
- Aurelius H. Piper, Jr. (1945–2021), Chief Quiet Hawk - appointed by his father, Big Eagle, to succeed him as Chief of Chiefs.

== See also ==
- History of Trumbull, Connecticut
