= Paugusset =

Native American tribe in Connecticut

Regions with significant populations
- western Connecticut, U.S.

Languages
- Historically likely an Eastern Algonquian language, now English

Religion
- Indigenous religion, Christianity

Related ethnic groups
- Wappinger Confederacy including Potatuck, Schaghticoke people

The Paugusset are an Indigenous people of the Northeastern Woodlands in western Connecticut. Paugusset is also the name of their principal settlement in the 17th and 18th centuries.

Historian Edward Manning Ruttenber wrote that they were a band of the Wappinger people and a subject of the Mattebesec. Ethnographer John Reed Swanton described them as the Paugusset sachemdon. A sachem was a leader among Eastern Algonquian-speaking peoples.

Today, Paugusset people are members of the stated-recognized Golden Hill Paugussett Indian Nation.

== Territory and settlements ==
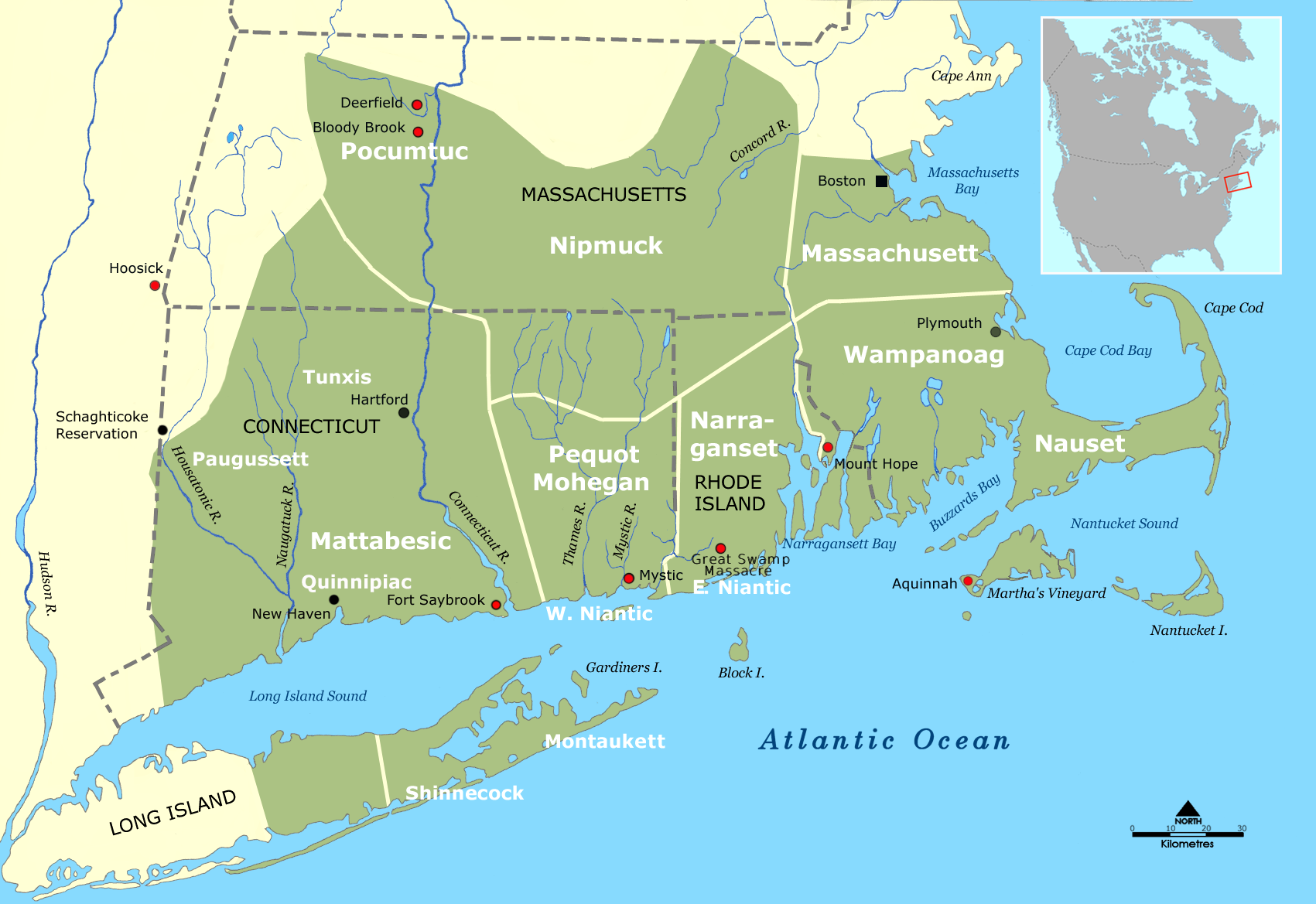
Map with location of Pauguset in Western Connecticut circa 1600 CE

Historically, they lived along both banks of the Housatonic River near the Naugatuck River.

Their primary town, Paugusset, was on the eastern bank of the Housatonic River and had 300 residents at its height.

They had towns in present-day Milford and Derby in New Haven County as well as Fairfield and Litchfield counties.

Besides the principle village of Paugusset, their other villages included Meshapock, Naugatuck, Pequonnock (Pauquaunuch), Pisquheege, Pomerag, Potatuck (Poodatook), Squantuck, Turkey Hill, Wepowaug, and Woronock. The Paugusset and Schaghticoke both lived in Chusetown, a Native settlement in present-day Seymour, Connecticut.

== Name ==
Paugusset translates to "where the narrows open out" or "place where forks in a river join." The name Paugusset is also commonly spelled Paugussett. Their name was recorded in numerous other ways, including Pagasett, Paugasset, Wepawaug, and Wopowage.

== Language ==
Anthropologist Frederick Webb Hodge wrote that the Paugusset spoke an Algonquian language. The Connecticut State Department of Education states that they spoke an Iroquoian language related to Natick.

== History ==
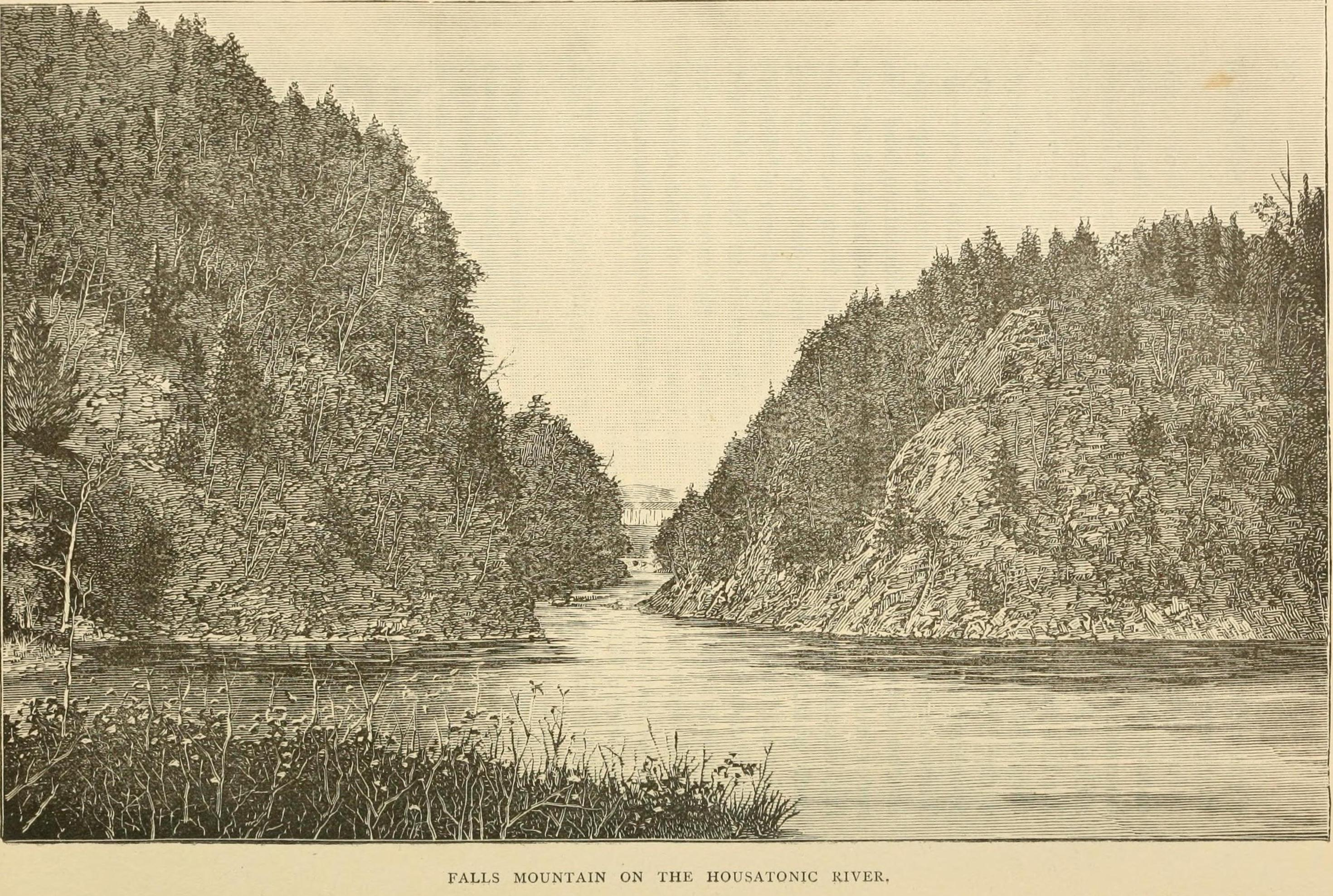
Engraving of the Falls Mountain gorge on the Housatonic River in present-day New Milford, Connecticut. Site of a 17th-century Paugussett fishing village

=== 17th century ===
The Paugusset's first recorded contact with Europeans was in 1637, when the English fought a war with the Pequot, who took refuge with Paugusset. The English then attacked Paugusset villages. After this war, the Paugusset lost 90 percent of their land, and the English enslaved 200 to 400 Paugusset people and sent them to the Caribbean.

In 1659, the English granted the Paugusset 100 acres of land near Bridgeport, Connecticut. In early historical times, their population was between 700 and 800 people. By 1660, they had sold most of their lands to English colonists.

=== 18th century ===
About 127 Paugusset settled in the village of Scaticook in 1762, while about 60 remained in their earlier homelands.

=== 19th century ===
The Paugusset retained very little of their land. Many moved further west in Connecticut, while others moved to nearby cities where they worked in factories. By the mid-19th century, the tribe retained one acre of land in Nichols, Connecticut. William Sherman (Paugusset) lived on this parcel with his family, which went into a tribal trust when he died in 1886.

=== 20th century ===
Paugusset people organized as the Golden Hill Paugussett Indian Nation, which is a state-recognized tribe in Connecticut. Ethel Sherman Piper Baldwin (Paugusset) became chief in 1933. Aurelius H. Piper Sr. (1916–2008) became chief in 1959 and fought to regain historical lands for the Golden Hill Paugussett. Through grants, the tribe purchased 106 acres in Colchester, Connecticut, which the state put into trust. Aurelius Henry Piper Jr. "Quiet Hawk" became active chief in 1991.

=== 21st century ===
The Golden Hill Paugussett Indian Nation petitioned for federal recognition as a Native American tribe; however, their petition was denied in 2004. The final determination found that the state-recognized tribe was formed from Golden Hill Paugussets and Turkey Hill Paugussets, who had not constituted a single, unified government through history.

== See also ==
- Ansantawae (Wepawaug, fl. 1639–1665), leader who sold land where Milford, Connecticut, was established
- Little Pootatuck Brook site, 18th-century Potatuck village site
- Schaghticoke Tribal Nation
