= Lake Mauweehoo =

Lake in Sherman, Connecticut

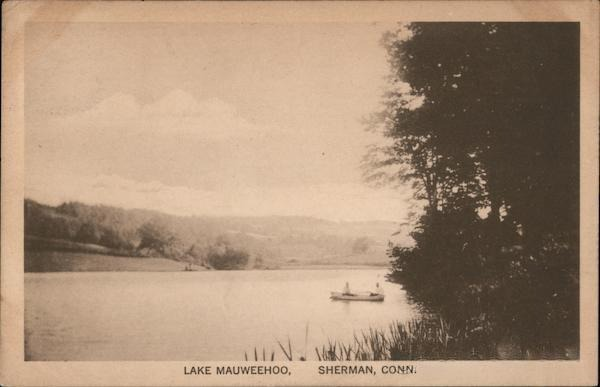
- Lake Mauweehoo depicted on a 1920s postcard

- Location within Connecticut
- Location: Sherman, Connecticut
- Coordinates: 41.5396196°N 73.4981847°W
- Surface area: 31 acres (13 ha)

Lake Mauweehoo is a 31-acre man-made lake in the town of Sherman, Connecticut. It was created in 1906 to support a community of people who moved to rural Connecticut from New York City.

== History ==
Lake Mauweehoo was first created in 1906 by damming Glen Brook. The area was settled by transplants from Brooklyn, New York who built a community of summer homes in the town of Sherman. They were led by Warren Hugh Wilson, a champion of the country life movement and rural living. The community went on to form the Mauweehoo Lake Association to fund the construction of the dam. Access to the lake has remained exclusive to the residents.

The lake is named for Gideon Mauwee, sachem of the Schaghticoke Tribe.

== Ecology and hydrology ==
Lake Mauweehoo has one outlet, Glen Brook, which drains into Squantz Pond.

Lake Mauweehoo is at the beginning of the Sherman Breeding Bird Survey Route, a 25-mile route which is part of the larger North American Breeding Bird Survey.

== Dam ==
The Lake Mauweehoo Dam is a combination earth embankment and stone masonry concrete dam approximately 225 feet long and 22 feet high. A stone masonry wall averaging approximately 8.5 feet wide and a 24 inch thick concrete facia on the upstream side of the masonry wall runs the full length of the dam. Earth fill lying on a 2:1 slope is on the upstream side of the above-mentioned wall and stone rubble and miscellaneous debris on a 1:1.5 slope lies on the downstream side of the wall.
