= Trudie Lamb-Richmond =

Native American activist (1931–2021)

Gertrude Alice Lamb-Richmond (née Ray; August 5, 1931 – April 26, 2021) was an American educator and author belonging to the Schaghticoke Tribal Nation in Connecticut. She was involved in Native American educational and political issues.

== Biography ==
Lamb-Richmond was born on August 5, 1931, in Bridgeport, Connecticut, the eldest daughter of Margaret (née Cogswell) and John Ray Jr. She was raised in the Schaghticoke reservation in northwestern Connecticut. She graduated from Long Island University, subsequently completing a masters degree in anthropology from the University of Connecticut and a masters in Education from the Bank Street College of Education.

Richmond was a Native storyteller who frequently gave seminars throughout New England. She served as Director of Public Programs for the Mashantucket Pequot Museum & Research Center, on the Mashantucket Pequot Reservation, and was the Director of Education for the Public Programs for the Institute for American Indian Studies in Washington, Connecticut, from 1988 to 1993 and its assistant director from 1993 to 1996. In 1974, she co-founded American Indians for Development (A.I.D.), serving as its Assistant Director until 1986. In 1987, Connecticut Governor William O'Neill appointed Richmond to a task force on Native American issues. Richmond was a member of the Connecticut Indian Affairs Council from 1974 to 1985, and served on the Native American Heritage Committee as a legislative appointee.

In 2010, Richmond retired as the Director of Public Programs at the Mashantucket Pequot Museum and Research Center after fifteen years.

She died aged 89 on April 26, 2021, in the home of her daughter Erin Lamb-Meeches.

== Awards ==
- The First People's Fund Community Spirit awarded Trudie Lamb Richmond for her lifetime work as an educator and Native storyteller.

== Literary works ==
Richmond consulted and collaborated with scholars including Lucianne Lavin, Amy Den Ouden, and Russell Handsman She also published multiple essays on her tribal heritage.

=== Books ===
- The Spirit of the Drum (1986) and Perspectives:
- Authentic Voices of Native Americans (1996).
- With fellow tribal member Ruth Garby Torres, she edited the Schaghticoke section of Dawnland Voices: Writing from Indigenous New England(2014), in which her essay on Schaghticoke elder and culture keeper Eunice Mauwee (1756-1860) appears.

== Video Links ==
- Native Storytelling
- Schaghticoke Rally and Protest, Jan. 29, 2009 in Hartford CT
- Mashantucket Pequot Museum, 2010

== Social media ==
- Trudie Lamb Richmond Facebook page

== See also ==
- Schaghticoke Tribal Nation
- Truman Bradley (Native American)
- Kent, Connecticut
