= Wawyachtonoc =

Native American tribe from New York and Connecticut

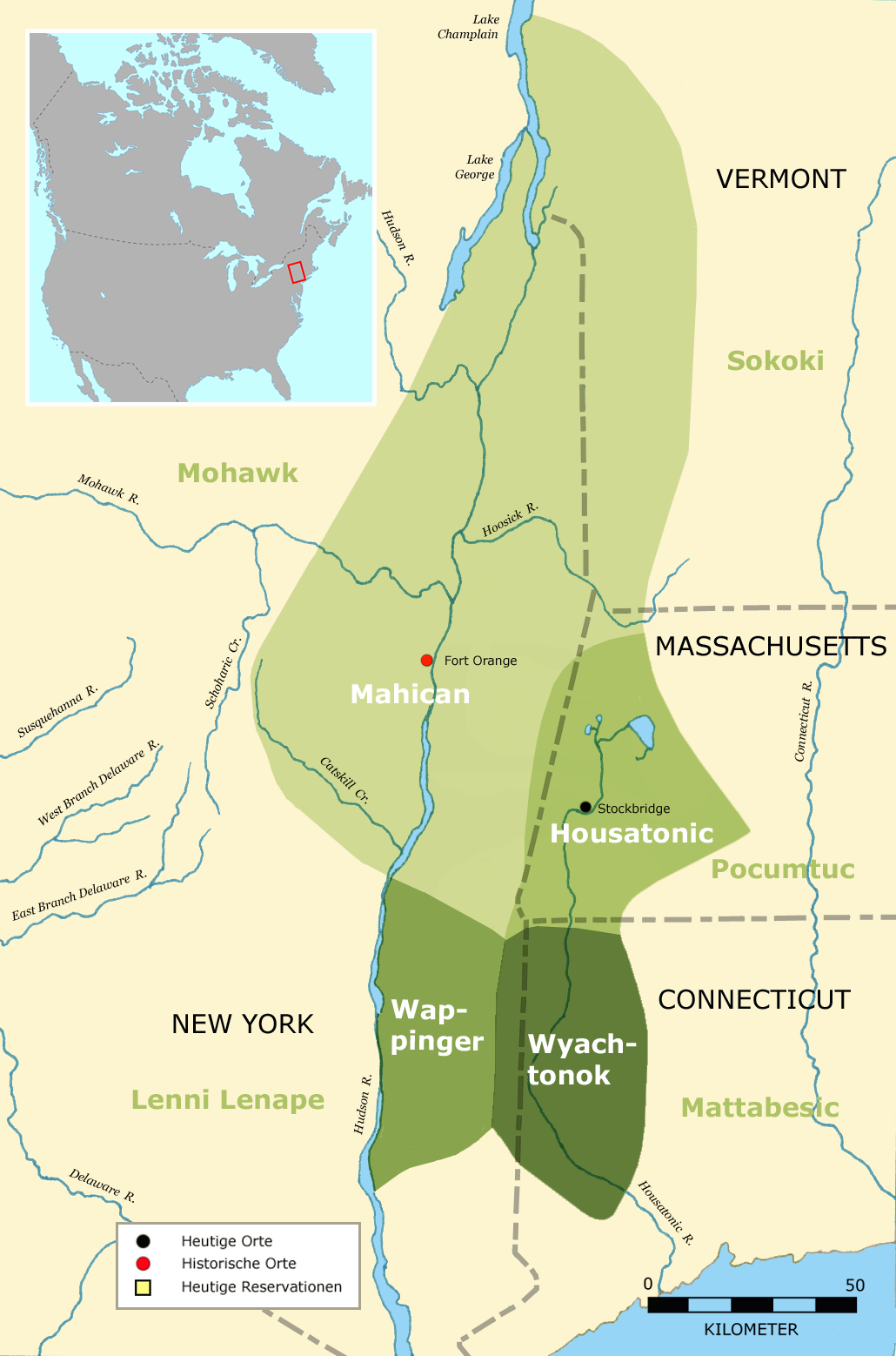
- A map of the traditional territory of Mahican-affiliated tribes. The Wawyachtonoc are shown in dark green in the bottom right.

Total population
- extinct as a tribe merged into Stockbridge–Munsee Community, Brothertown Indians, and Schaghticoke Tribal Nation

Regions with significant populations
- Northeastern Connecticut, later New York

Languages
- An Eastern Algonquian language

Religion
- Indigenous religion, Moravian Church

Related ethnic groups
- Paugussett, Mohican Confederacy

The Wawyachtonoc (also rendered or spelled Wawyaghtonock, Wyachtonack, and Wawyachtonock, among many other variant orthographic transcriptions—see § Name, below) were an Eastern Algonquian-speaking Indigenous people of the Northeastern Woodlands, a Native American society whose territory, at its greatest extent, consisted of eight semi-permanently- or seasonally-inhabited primary settlements—including the tribal nation's titular "capital" of Weantinock, located in present-day New Milford, Connecticut—numerous smaller satellite camps, and the lands upon which they were located, altogether covering the combined expanse of the whole of today's northwestern Connecticut and portions of east-central New York state.

Originally a subgroup of the Paugussett, the Wawyachtonoc aligned with the Mahican Confederacy in 1687 before later dispersing—their descendants ultimately becoming part of the Schaghticoke Tribal Nation in western Connecticut, as well as the Stockbridge–Munsee Nation and Brothertown Indians in Wisconsin.

== Name ==
The autonymous ethnonym—or endonym—Wawyachtonoc is often translated into English as "eddy people" or "people of the curved channel".

The name Wawyachtonoc is also transcribed and rendered, in Latin script, as Wyachtonok, Wawayachtonoc, and Wyaghtonok. From this term derives the demonym Weantinock—the name given by the Wawyachtonoc, and toponym used by them in reference to, their primary community and chief settlement, historically located along the confluence of the Housatonic River and its tributary Still River in the vicinity of what is today downtown New Milford, Connecticut, extending to the town's nearby Lovers Leap State Park and the area surrounding the Park's titular Lovers Leap Bridge.

== Territory ==
The traditional territory of the Wawyachtonoc covered much of today's Litchfield County, Connecticut, being centered on the Housatonic Valley region of present-day Greater Danbury, roughly coterminous with the Litchfield Hills and the state's contemporary Northwest Hills Planning Region. Their homeland reached as far west of Connecticut as the area of east-central Hudson Valley and spanned part of the inland Harlem and adjacent Shekomeko river valleys, extending very slightly into what is now easternmost Columbia and Dutchess counties in New York.

In the ethnogeographic study of Indigenous American societies, the Wawyachtonoc's territory is categorized as part of the 'Coastal' zone of the Northeastern Woodlands cultural area, itself a sub-region of the Eastern Woodlands. (One of three constituent zones comprising the Northeastern Woodlands, the 'Coastal' zone is defined as extending along the Atlantic seaboard from the Canadian Maritime provinces and the Gaspé Peninsula south to the coastal plains of North Carolina.)

=== Villages ===
- Weantinock, the tribe's primary village, situated along the Housatonic River near present New Milford
- Bantam
- Pachgatgoch (present day Schaghticoke Indian Reservation - Kent, Connecticut) "Where the river forks" at the mouth of the Housatonic River and Ten Mile River.
- Pomperaug
- Scaticook
- Shekomeko (Shecomeco), meaning "great village," 2 miles south of present Pine Plains, New York
- Weataug, meaning "wigwam place," likely on the Housatonic River between Washining Lake and Canaan, Connecticut, near present Salisbury
- Wechquadnach, meaning "wrapped around by the mountain," on the Eastern side of Indian Lake, Litchfield County

== History ==
In 1687, the Wyachtonok, originally subgroup of Paugussett, joined the Mohican Confederacy.

The majority of the Wawyachtonoc were converted to Christianity, beginning in 1740, by Moravian missionaries. During this period Wawyachtonoc populations became concentrated at the Moravian missions at Shekomeko and Scaticook. Some of them moved to Moravian Indian communities in Pennsylvania.

In the 1830s, some Wawyachtonoc were displaced to Wisconsin. These Wawyachtonoc descendants are now part of the Stockbridge–Munsee Community and Brothertown Indians of Wisconsin, while those that remained in Connecticut are part of the Schaghticoke Tribal Nation, a state-recognized tribe.
