= Squantz Pond State Park =

State park in Fairfield County, Connecticut

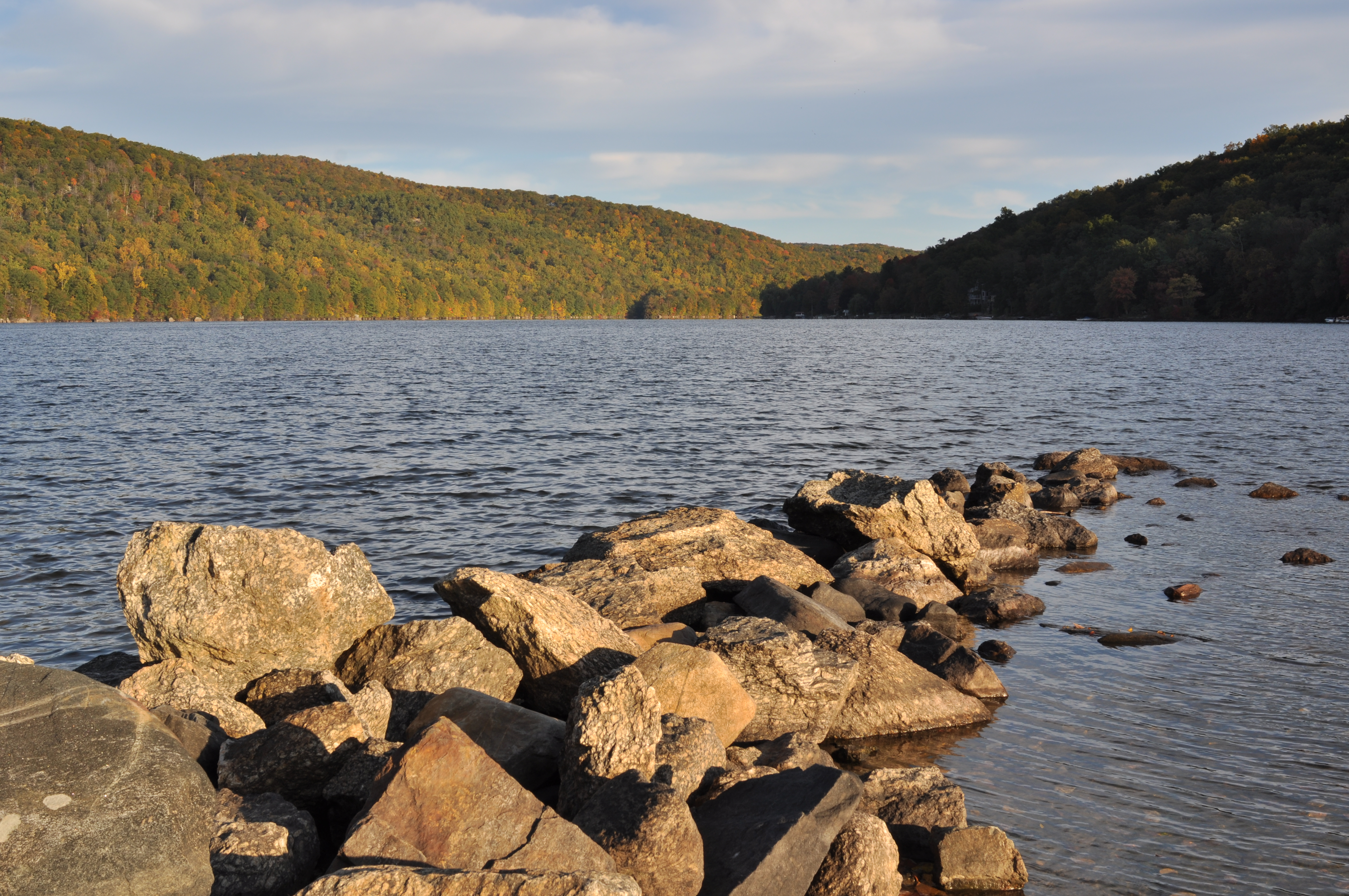

- Location within Connecticut Location within the United States
- Location: New Fairfield, Connecticut, United States
- Coordinates: 41°30′45″N 73°28′32″W
- Area: 172 acres (70 ha)
- Elevation: 427 ft (130 m)
- Established: 1926
- Administrator: Connecticut Department of Energy and Environmental Protection
- Designation: Connecticut state park
- Website: Official website

Squantz Pond State Park is a public recreation area located 10 miles (16 km) north of Danbury in the town of New Fairfield, Connecticut. The state park encompasses 172 acres (70 ha) on the southwestern shore of 270-acre (110 ha) Squantz Pond, offering opportunities for boating, swimming, fishing, and hiking. The park is bordered on the west by Pootatuck State Forest and is managed by the Connecticut Department of Energy and Environmental Protection.

== History ==
The state park was established through the purchase of a 138-acre farm in 1926. The pond and state park are named for Chief Squantz, a leader of the Schaghticoke tribe.

== Activities and amenities ==
The park offers swimming, fishing, and scuba diving as well as a launch for motorized boating. The park also has canoe and kayak rentals, picnicking facilities, and a nature center. The park's hiking trails grant access to the adjacent Pootatuck State Forest.

Trails

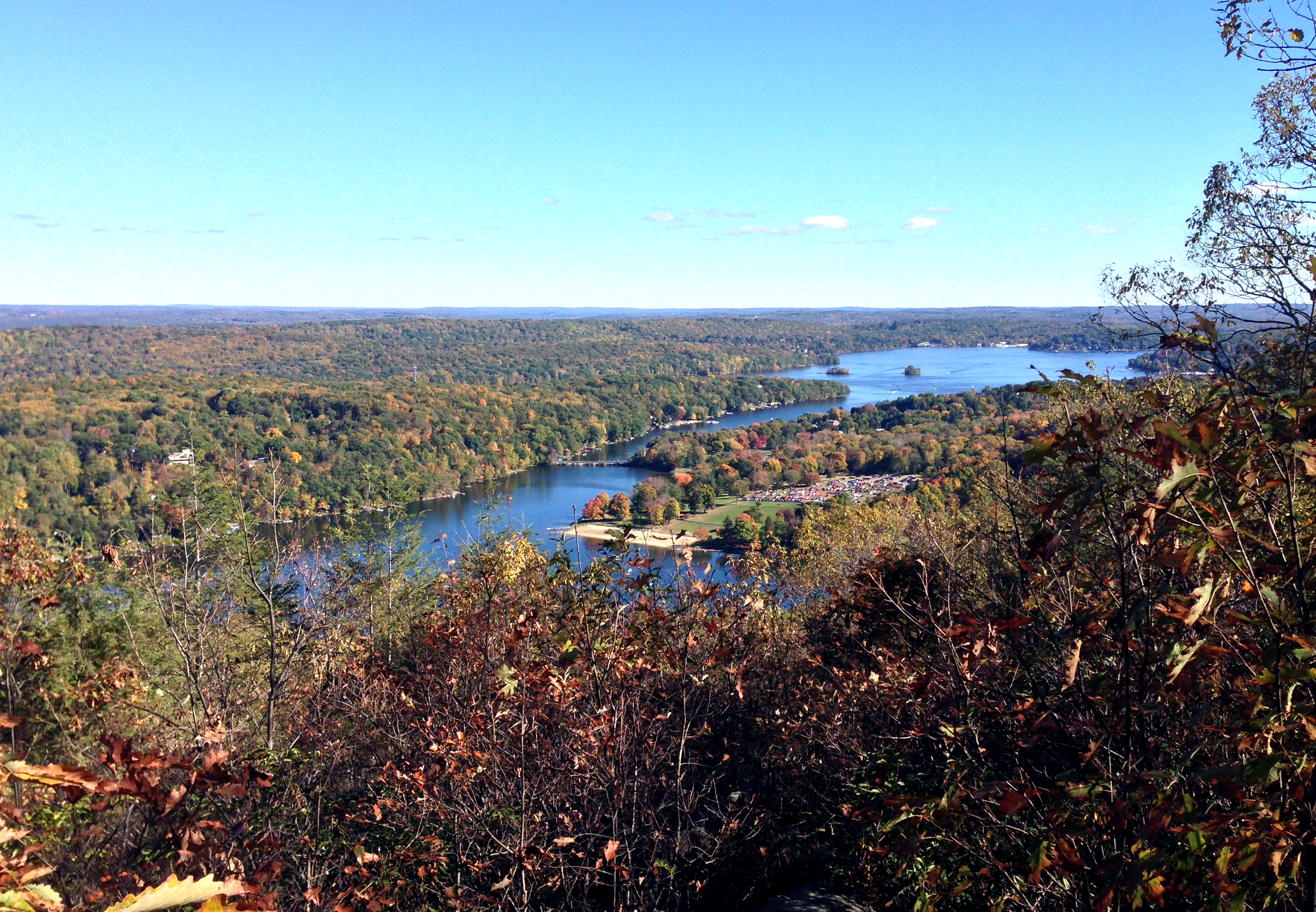
Look Out Point at Squantz Pond State Park

From the west side, the main trail starts from the north end of the picnic area; it follows the edges of the lake's western shoreline for 2 miles to a peninsula that juts out into the lake and has an unobstructed view of the entire lake.

A green trail travels north to Worden Brook and then head southwest, passing the northern end of the yellow trail, and turns to heads eastward to the southern part of the yellow trail which continues east, back to the outgoing green trail. A shortcut can be had to shorten the green trail circular walk by taking the yellow trail south when it first appears.

An unmarked trail goes along the west shoreline of Squantz Pond; old reddish-brown markers can still be seen. The trail parallels the shoreline. It is mostly a hemlock laden area with rapidly flowing streams splashing down to the lake and interesting rock formations. A little less than half-way there, an open area and rock on which to stand offer a look back at the beach at Squantz Pond State Park. Also along the way, a red-blazed trail comes down the steep grade from Pootatuck Mountain. The trail ends near Worden Brook where a bushwhack south leads to the main trail.

== Safety issues ==
From 1996, when the Connecticut Department of Environmental Protection began keeping records on drownings at Connecticut state parks, through 2011, fifteen people drowned at Squantz Pond State Park.

In July 2007, DEP officials made "the Rocks" off limits to beachgoers. In response to the drownings and pressure from local officials, the state announced plans to reduce the parking capacity of the park from about 500 cars to about 250, and to post signs on nearby Interstate 84 announcing if the park has reached capacity. Officials said the reduced capacity would help DEP prevent swimming outside of authorized areas.

On Labor Day 2007, an 18-year-old teenager from Queens, New York City, New York, became the third drowning victim of 2007 at about 1 p.m. at East Beach, an area that was not protected by lifeguards because the state DEP believed the drowning danger to be lower than other sections of the park.

In June 2008, DEP unveiled several improvements to the park designed to improve the safety of swimmers. The designated beach swimming area was enlarged and clearly marked to make it more attractive to swimmers, trees were removed to improve the sight lines of on-duty lifeguards, and a dock was installed for a patrol boat.

The other Squantz Pond victims drowned in the areas known as "the Rocks" and the unroped section of "Squantz Cove" that are outside the designated swimming area. These areas also were not protected by lifeguards.
