= The Spa at Norwich Inn =

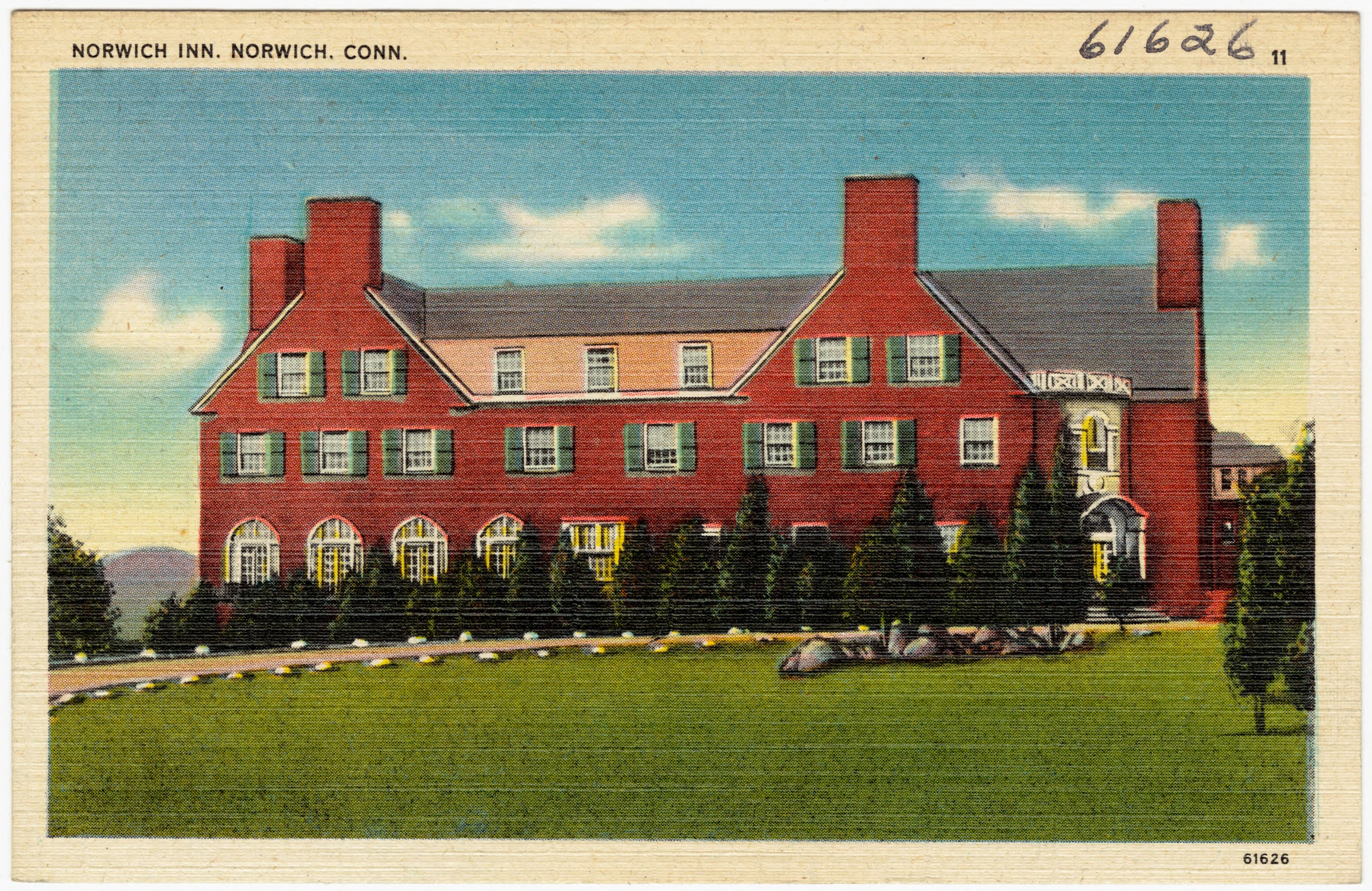
- Postcard image, c.1930-45

- Location within Connecticut

General information
- Location: 607 W Thames St, Norwich, Connecticut
- Coordinates: 41.501397°N 72.096872°W
- Completed: 1929

The Spa at Norwich Inn, in Norwich, Connecticut, formerly known as Norwich Inn, is a historic hotel. Established in 1929 or 1930, it is located at 607 West Thames Street (CT-32), in Norwich. It is owned and operated by the Mashantucket Pequot Tribal Nation.

It was built as the Norwich Inn in 1930, with a Georgian Revival-style building. It had 75 guest rooms and a golf course.

A local history describes the golf course as having been developed earlier from a six-hole course, expanded to a nine-hole course, and expanded again to an 18-hole course, apparently before 1929.

An early promotional card from the Norwich Inn stated:

Stepping out of the INN onto a broad observation veranda one hundred feet long, the golfer descends onto the first tee green for a tour around eighteen holes as a beautiful sporty course running through hill and dale that is liked by all who use it. The leading pros of the country have played many matches on this course. Special privileges are given to the golfing guests of the INN to use the course.

Besides golf, the inn also offered equestrian paths for horse riders.

Visitors over the years included Eddie Albert, Bert Lahr, Basil Rathbone, George Bernard Shaw, and Frank Sinatra.

After World War II it was owned by the City of Norwich, and was operated as a boardinghouse and as jail overflow. It was sold in 1983 to the Edward J. Safdie Group, which renovated it and built a separate Spa building. It was purchased in 1994 by the Mashantucket Pequot Tribal Nation. In 2000 a $15 million renovation and expansion was completed and it was renamed as "The Spa at Norwich Inn."

In 2020, it was a member of the Historic Hotels of America. In 2022, the hotel was no longer a member.

== See also ==
- Foxwoods Resort Casino, also owned and operated by the Mashantucket Pequot Tribal Nation
