= Aurelius H. Piper Sr. =

Native American activist from Connecticut (1916–2008)

Chief Aurelius H. Piper Sr.
- Born: August 31, 1916; Bridgeport, Connecticut
- Died: August 3, 2008 (aged 91); Trumbull, Connecticut
- Other name: Big Eagle
- Citizenship: American
- Years active: 1959–2008
- Organization: Golden Hill Paugussett Indian Nation
- Predecessor: Ethel Peters
- Successor: Aurelius H. Piper Jr.
- Spouse: Marsha Conte Piper
- Children: 5
- Parents: Aurelius Henry Piper (father); Ethel Peters (mother)

Aurelius H. Piper Sr. (August 31, 1916 – August 3, 2008), also known as Big Eagle, was the chief of the Golden Hill Paugussett Indian Nation, a state-recognized tribe in Connecticut, from 1959 until 2008.

== Early life ==
Aurelius H. Piper was born in Bridgeport, Connecticut on August 31, 1916, to Aurelius Henry Piper (1889–1996) and Ethel Lillianoh Sherman Piper Baldwin Peters (ca. 1893–1993). Piper served in the United States military during World War II and took part in the American landings during the North African Campaign.

== Leadership ==
In 1959, Piper became chief of the Golden Hill Paugussett Indian Nation, succeeding his mother, Ethel Peters, in 1959. Piper later took up residence in the Paugussett's quarter-acre reservation in Trumbull, Connecticut.

Piper traveled extensively as a representative of the Golden Hill Paugussett and other Native American groups to campaign for the rights of ethnic minorities and indigenous peoples. He visited Moscow as part of a delegation of Native Americans. Piper also wrote for the De Kiva Journal as an eastern North American foreign correspondent. The De Kiva advocated for Native American rights before the International Human Rights Council in Geneva, Switzerland, and is based in Belgium and the Netherlands.

Piper's son, Kenneth, who is also known as Moonface Bear, was involved in a ten-week standoff between Connecticut State Police and the Colchester, Connecticut, branch of the Golden Hill Paugussett. The standoff stemmed from the illegal sale of untaxed cigarettes on the Colchester portion of the reservation. Kenneth Piper died in 1996.

Piper served on the boards of several Connecticut organizations that advocated for Native American and minority rights. He also served as a "spiritual liaison" for Native Americans in prison. He was named chief of the century by the Florida chapter of the White Buffalo Society "for his work in furthering Native American causes in Connecticut, across the country, and abroad."

"It is a sacred obligation", says the Golden Hill Paugussett Chief, Big Eagle. "Indian people must keep their languages alive. If the language is not spoken, it must be made to live again."

Piper was the subject of the book Quarter Acre of Heartache which is attributed to Claude Clayton Smith but is primarily written by Piper. The book details the history of the Paugussett Indian Nation and the fight to save what was left of their tribal land: a quarter-acre property in suburban Trumbull, Connecticut.

== Background ==
Golden Hill Paugussett Indian Nation is a small, state-recognized tribe of Paugusset people with tiny Connecticut reservations in both Trumbull and Colchester. The tribe has been an officially recognized tribe by the state of Connecticut for approximately 300 years. However, the United States Bureau of Indian Affairs has repeatedly refused the tribe's request for federal recognition. The last refusal came in 2004. The Golden Hill Paugusett had originally claimed more than 700,000 acres (2,800 km^{2}) of land during its fight for federal recognition. The tribe's land claim included an area stretching from Middletown to Wilton and from Greenwich, Connecticut, through lower portions of New York's Westchester County, which set off legal challenges against the tribe's recognition attempts. The Golden Hill Paugussett has dropped these far-reaching land claims, but could revive them if federal recognition is eventually achieved.

== Death and legacy ==
Aurelius H. Piper Sr. died of natural causes on August 3, 2008, at the Golden Hill reservation in Trumbull, Connecticut, at the age of 92. He was survived by his wife, Marsha Conte Piper; five children; several stepchildren, grandchildren, and great-grandchildren.

Piper's son, Aurelius H. Piper Jr., who was also known as Chief Quiet Hawk, assumed the role of chief from his father.
