= Pootatuck State Forest =

State forest in Connecticut, US

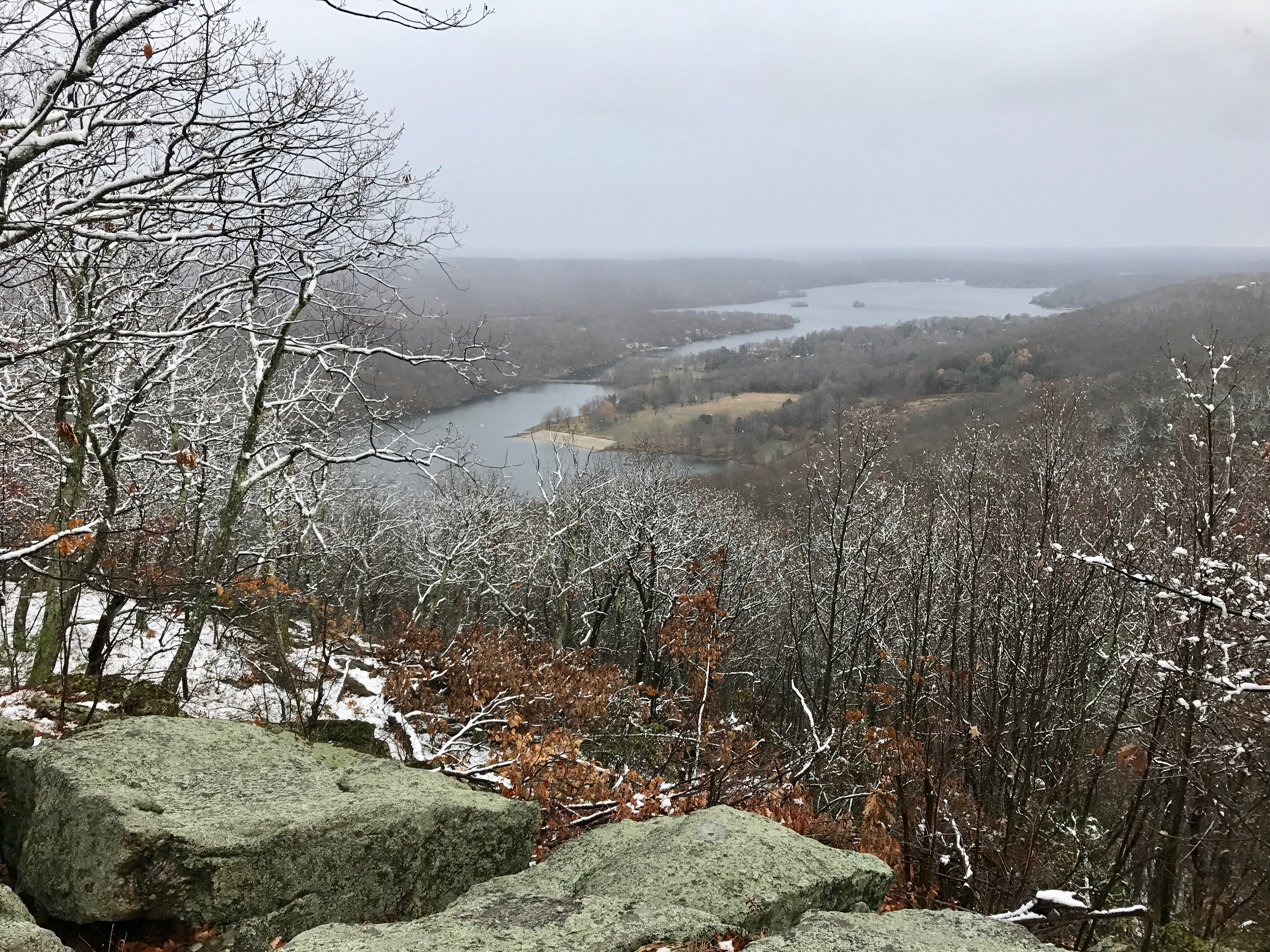
- Pond Mountain, Squantz Pond and Candlewood Lake from the scenic overlook on Pootatuck State Forest's Blue Trail.

- Location within Connecticut Location within the United States
- Location: New Fairfield and Sherman, Connecticut, United States
- Coordinates: 41°30′55″N 73°29′53″W
- Area: 1,103 acres (446 ha)
- Established: 1920s
- Administrator: Connecticut Department of Energy and Environmental Protection
- Website: Pootatuck State Forest

Pootatuck State Forest is a Connecticut state forest located mainly in the town of New Fairfield with a small fraction in Sherman. Recreational activities include hiking, mountain biking, letterboxing, hunting, birdwatching, snowmobiling, and cross-country skiing. The main forest property borders on and can be accessed via trails from the adjacent Squantz Pond State Park. The name of the forest was derived from the Potatuck people.

== History ==
The land which became Pootatuck State Forest was purchased by Elliott B. Bronson of the State Park and Forest Commission in 1926. The area was protected from Connecticut Light & Power, who was acquiring large tracts of land around Squantz Pond. 960 acres were purchased at a price of $10/acre.

== Recreation ==
The park contains five miles of hiking trails. The Pine Hill Trail is a popular destination for hikers, and is known for the scenic views of Squantz Pond and Candlewood Lake.

Pootatuck is a spot utilized by wild foragers. Morel mushrooms, fiddlehead ferns, and ramps are especially prized. Hen of the woods, chicken of the woods, black trumpet mushrooms, garlic mustard, and Japanese wineberry are also harvested.

== Parcels ==
There are two smaller Pootatuck State Forest property parcels in New Fairfield, Connecticut near to but disconnected from the main property and Squantz Pond State Park.

- The Western Pootatuck State Forest parcel is located north of Beaver Bog Road just west of the intersection of Beaver Bog Road and Short Woods Road. (41.493866°N 73.490825°W)
- The Southern Pootatuck State Forest parcel is located between Short Woods Road and CT Route 39 slightly south of the intersection of Beaver Bog Road and Short Woods Road. (41.494402°N 73.484836°W)
