= Schaghticoke Indian Tribe =

Faction of a state-recognized tribe in Connecticut

Schaghticoke Indian Nation
- Location: United States
- Official language: English
- Website: www.schaghticokeindiantribe.org

The Schaghticoke Indian Tribe (SIT) is a faction of the state-recognized Schagticoke tribe in Connecticut. It is not a federally recognized tribe.

== History ==
The Schaghticoke Indian Tribe is a splinter group that split off from the larger Schaghticoke Tribal Nation in 1986. Both groups are factions of "the Schagticoke", which is state-recognized in Connecticut as a tribe. Both factions have filed separate petitions for federal recognition. SIT applied for federal recognition in March, 2022.

== See also ==
- Schaghticoke people
- State-recognized tribes in the United States
