= Potatuck =

Extinct Native American tribe from Connecticut

Total population
- Extinct as a tribe (merged into the Schaghticoke)

Regions with significant populations
- United States (Connecticut)

Languages
- an Eastern Algonquian language

Religion
- Indigenous religion

Related ethnic groups
- Other Algonquian peoples

The Potatuck (or Pootatuck) were a Native American tribe in Connecticut. They were related to the Paugussett people, historically located during and prior to the colonial era in western Connecticut. They lived in what is now Newtown (in Fairfield County), Woodbury (in Litchfield County), and Southbury (in New Haven County), and along the whole Housatonic River. One of their last sites of habitation, Little Pootatuck Brook Archeological Site, is listed on the National Register of Historic Places. After losses due to epidemics and warfare, they merged in the early 18th century with other remnant Native American groups in the area, forming the Schaghticoke tribe.

== Name and eponyms ==
The Potatuck have also been listed as Poodatook, Pootatook, Pudaduc, and Pudatuck in historical literature.

Prior to the 18th century, the Housatonic River was alternatively known as the Pootatuck River. Accounts differ on the origin of this name, with some claiming that Pootatuck is an Algonquian term translating to "river of the falls" while others relate the term was eponymous, reflecting the name of the tribe. "Pootatuck River" eventually came to refer a lesser tributary in the Housatonic watershed which empties into the Housatonic River at Sandy Hook, Connecticut.

Pootatuck State Forest also bears the name of the tribe.

== Subsistence ==
Like neighboring tribes such as the Paugusset, the Potatuck were a farming and fishing culture. The women cultivated varieties of their staple crops, such as corn, squash, and beans, as well as the tobacco valued for ritual use. They also gathered berries, nuts, and other natural resources. The men fished in freshwater much of the year, and hunted deer and small game. They may have traveled to the coast of Long Island Sound to fish from saltwater in summer months.

== Post-encounter history ==
Many of the remnant Potatuck merged with survivors of the Weantinock, Mohegan, and other Indigenous peoples of the Northeastern Woodlands, after losses due to epidemics and warfare from European colonization pressures. They formed the Schaghticoke tribe in western Connecticut and eastern New York. The Connecticut colony granted them a 2,500-acre reservation in 1736, with territory on both sides of the Housatonic River. Through the 19th and early 20th centuries, state-appointed agents sold off essentially all the land to the east, reducing the reservation to about 400 acres of territory on the west bank of the river.

== Descendants ==
These descendants are part of the Schaghticoke Tribal Nation, which recognized as a tribe by the state of Connecticut, but not federally recognized as a Native American tribe by the US Department of the Interior. In 2011, the Schaghticoke Tribal Nation was recognized by a state court as the governing authority and legitimate legal successor to the historic tribe.

== Notable members ==
- Nonnewaug, an 18th-century leader
- Pomperaug, a 17th-century leader, succeeded by Aquiomp
- Squantz, an 18th-century leader
- Waramaug, an 18th-century leader and successor to Squantz
