= Little Pootatuck Brook Archeological Site =

Archaeological site in Connecticut, United States

- U.S. National Register of Historic Places
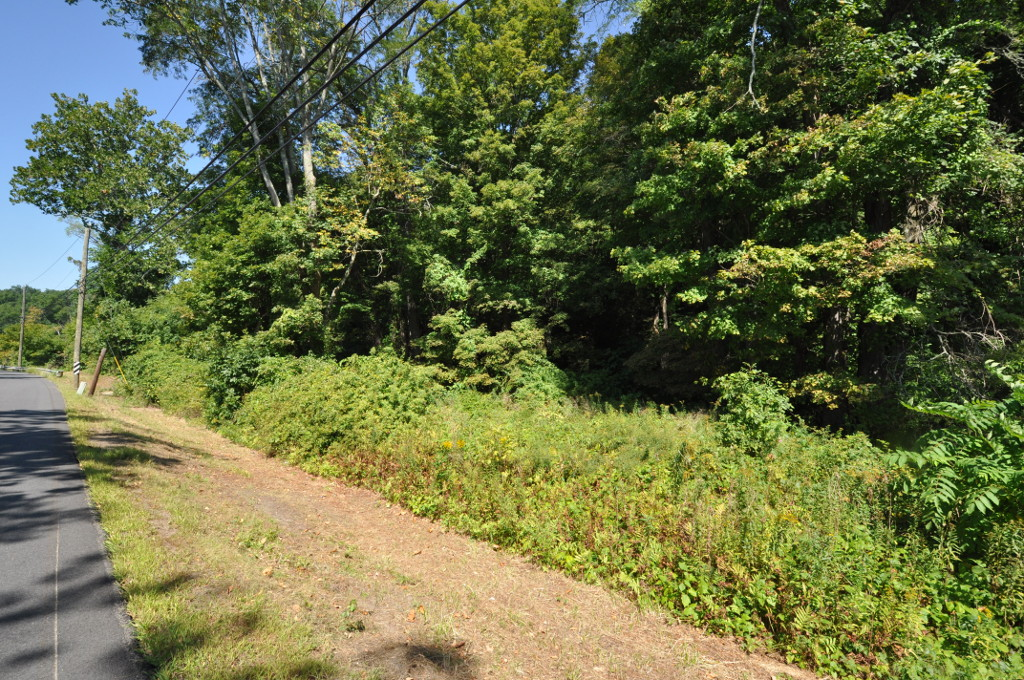
- Location: Address Restricted, Southbury, Connecticut
- Area: 4.5 acres (1.8 ha)
- Built: 1758
- NRHP reference No.: 90000980
- Added to NRHP: June 28, 1990

The Little Pootatuck Brook Archeological Site is a prehistoric/historic archaeological site in Southbury, Connecticut. Located near the banks of the Housatonic River, the site is believed to represent one of the last habitation sites of the Pootatuck tribe before its surviving members merged with the Schaghticoke people in the 18th century. The site was listed on the National Register of Historic Places in 1990.

The site is located on land that is now owned by a local conservation land trust. The site is part of a larger parcel of land purchased in 1753 from the Pootatuck by Eleazer Mitchell. Mitchell built his house nearby (of which only foundational remnants remain) and his family have farmed at least some of the land into the 21st century. The native village site includes a burial ground that is believed to contain the remains of the last Pootatuck sachem, Manquash.

== See also ==
- National Register of Historic Places listings in New Haven County, Connecticut
