= Squantz =

Potatuck sachem (died c.1725)

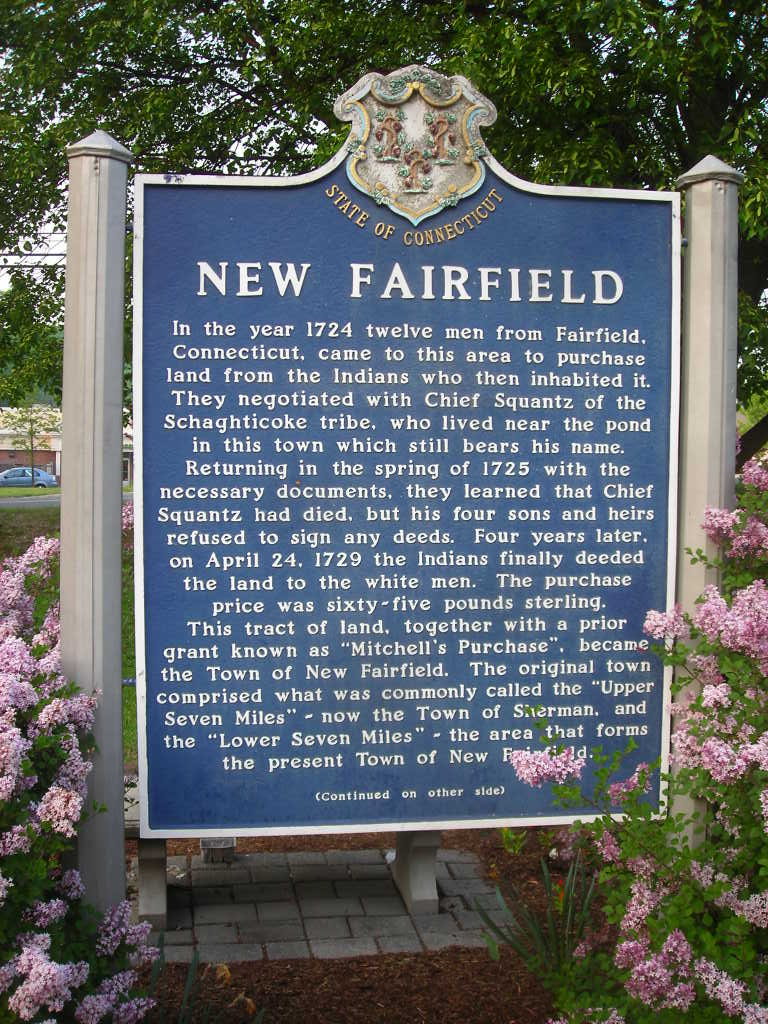
Historical marker in New Fairfield memorializing Squantz

Chief Squantz or Squons was a sachem of the Potatuck people, later integrated within the Schaghticoke tribe. He lived in western Connecticut in the early 18th century. Squantz refused to sell the land his people occupied to a group of twelve colonists called "The Proprietors" who came from Fairfield, Connecticut to find land for a new colonial township.

Squantz died during the winter of 1724–25, and his four sons and heirs refused to sell the land when The Proprietors returned in the spring of 1725. The land was later sold in 1729 for the equivalent of $300. The parcel of land would become integrated within the towns of Sherman and New Fairfield. Squantz' sons Mauwehu, Quepy, and Cockenon, as well as 10 other tribal members, signed the deed for the sale.

Chief Waramaug succeeded Squantz in 1725 in sachemship of the Potatuck. One of Chief Squantz's sons, Mauwehu, was said to have "possessed something of energy and commanding character for which his nation was once distinguished"; he succeeded Waramaug.

== Legacy ==
Squantz Pond was in the area of where Squantz lived and is named in his honor. Squantz Pond State Park subsequently bears his name.

It is claimed that Squantz' skeleton was excavated in the early 1920s by Keith Joyce, a land developer in the area. While digging trenches for water pipes, he uncovered a skeleton which was posed in a sitting position, facing east. The burial mound would have been easily visible from Pond Mountain, a lookout point and place of importance for the Schaghticoke. The remains were never positively identified.
