= Ansantawae =

Paugussett sachem (fl. 1639–1665)

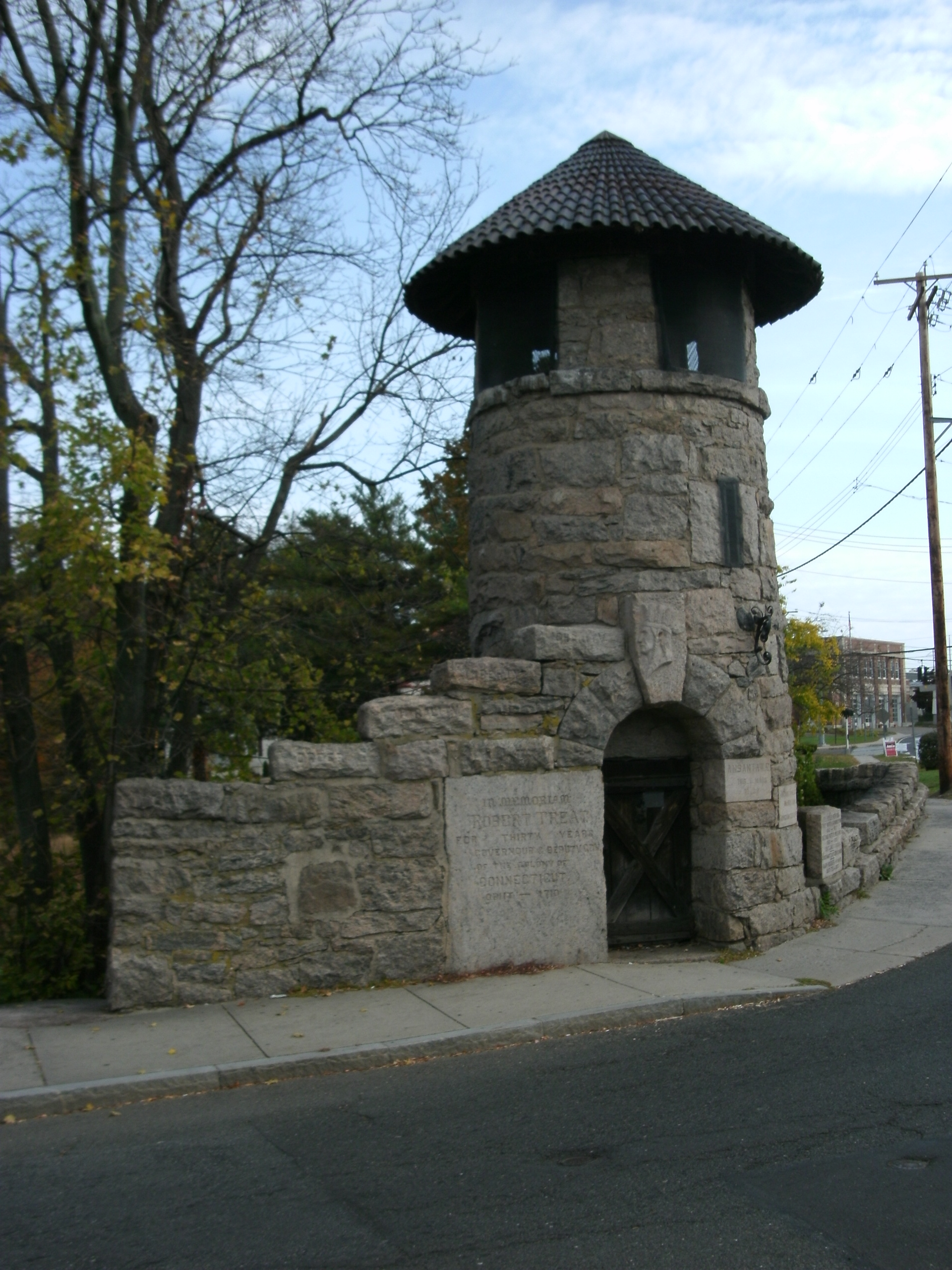
Ansantawae's likeness depicted above the entryway of the Milford Memorial Tower, Milford, Connecticut

Ansantawae or Nunsantawae (fl. 1639–1665) was a 17th-century sachem of the Wepawaug band, a subtribe of Paugussett, in modern day Connecticut. Ansantawae was responsible for selling his tribal lands to European settlers for what would become the towns of Milford and Orange.

== Biography ==
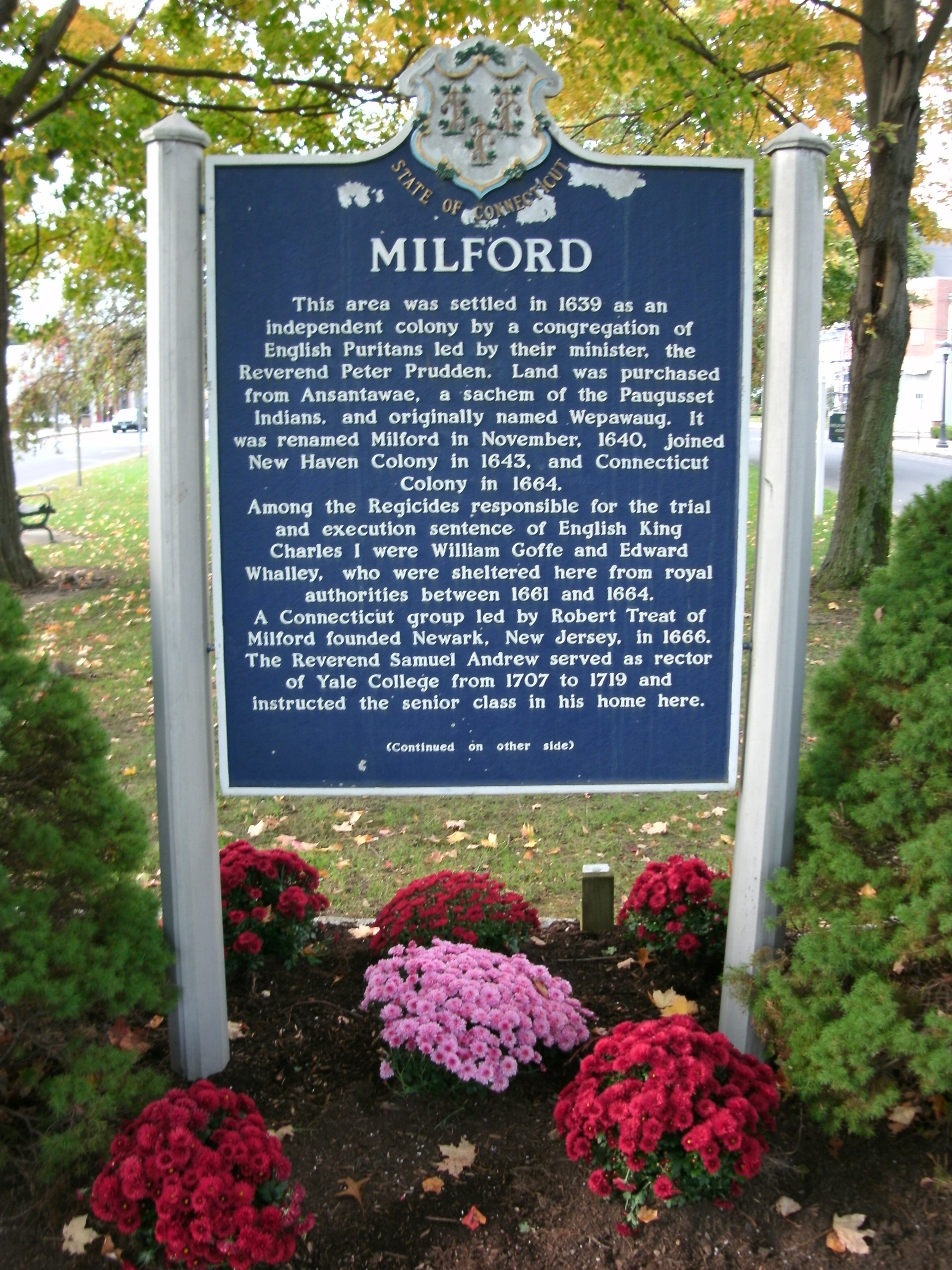
Historical marker in Milford mentioning Ansantawae

Ansantawae was an influential leader of the region. In 1639, he was approached by five men from the New Haven Colony looking to purchase land for a plantation. Ansantawae hoped that this transaction would secure an alliance for the Wepawaug against the Mohawk. He ceded land that was "bounded by the East River, the Housatonic River on the west, the Sound on the south, including Poquahaug (Charles) Island and by the 'two mile Indian path that goeth to Paugusset (Derby),' on the north." Ansantawae and the Englishmen performed a "twig and turf" ceremony to complete the transfer.

The Wepawaug became embroiled in a conflict with the Mohawks. In 1645, Ansantawae led a war party to successfully defend his tribe from a Mohawk offensive. A similar battle occurred in 1648. According to local legend, Ansantawae captured a Mohawk warrior and tied him naked to a pole to be ravaged by mosquitos.

Around 1665, Ansantawae's tribe was permitted to live on Turkey Hill in modern day Orange, Connecticut, as they had retained little land. Ansantawae himself retired to a richly furnished camp on Charles Island. It was believed that he laid a curse on the island that persisted after his death, as it was allegedly home to sacred spirits of his tribe.

== Family and legacy ==
Ansantawae's father was a sachem near modern day Derby, Connecticut. His older son, Tountonemoe, died circa 1660. His younger son, Ockenuck (Ackenach), became a sachem near modern day Stratford.

Ansantawae's likeness is depicted twice on the Milford Memorial Bridge. His signature mark in the shape of a bow and arrow is featured on the town seal of Milford. His name was given to the town's Masonic lodge.
