= Schaghticoke people =

Native American tribe of the Eastern Woodlands

Schaghticoke
Total population
- Schaghticoke Tribal Nation: 300+, rolls closed Schaghticoke Indian Tribe: ~65, rolls closed

Regions with significant populations
- United States (Connecticut)

Languages
- Mohican

Religion
- Christians; Traditionals

Related ethnic groups
- Potatuck, Weantinock, Podunk

Location of the Schaghticoke Reservation

The Schaghticoke (/ˈskætɪkoʊk/ SKAT-i-kohk or /ˈskætɪkʊk/ SKAT-i-kuuk) are a Native American tribe of the Eastern Woodlands who historically consisted of Mahican, Potatuck, Weantinock, Tunxis, Podunk, and their descendants, peoples Indigenous to what is now New York, Connecticut, and Massachusetts. The remnant tribes amalgamated in the area near the Connecticut-New York border after many losses, including the sale of some Schaghticoke and members of neighboring tribes into slavery in the Caribbean in the 1600s.

A Schaghticoke reservation, granted in 1736 by the General Assembly of the Colony of Connecticut, is one of the oldest in the United States. In 1740, shortly after the reservation was granted, approximately 500 Schaghticoke lived on it. After sales by state agents, the Schaghticoke hold less than a fifth of the original reserve with a 400-acre (1.6 km^{2}) reservation. It is located near the New York border within the boundaries of Kent in Litchfield County, to the west of the Housatonic River. The land is held in trust by the state for the Schaghticoke Tribal Nation.

In 1986, the tribe split. One group maintained the name Schaghticoke Indian Tribe (SIT), and the other identifies as the Schaghticoke Tribal Nation (STN). The Schaghticoke people have a long history of political relationships with both the former colony of Connecticut and the state. Most of the members live off the reservation in and near Kent. In 2004, the STN was the fourth tribe in Connecticut to gain federal recognition. But in 2005, after strong opposition from the state and several local governments as well as one landowner, several Schaghticoke individuals and the SIT, U.S. Bureau of Indian Affairs (BIA) reversed its decision, revoking recognition. The Schaghticoke Tribal Nation was among three state-recognized Connecticut tribes (along with the Eastern Pequot Tribal Nation and the Golden Hill Paugussett Indian Nation) who were denied under the Bush administration, which had concerns about casinos being opened by tribes.

The Schaghticoke filed a land claims action, seeking restoration of a total of 2,100 acres (850 ha). Most of the land in question is undeveloped. It is owned by Kent School, Connecticut Light & Power, a few private landowners, and the federal government. Following the Bureau of Indian Affairs' re-determined negative decision and resultant reversal of the STN's federal acknowledgment, the U.S. District Court dismissed the land claim case in 2010. "In ruling on the cross-motions for summary judgment, the court concluded that the BIA's final determination was 'reasonable based on the evidence before it,' and that the STN failed to satisfy the criteria of 'community' and 'political influence or authority' because a substantial portion of the Schaghticoke refused to be enrolled as members of the STN." The tribe appealed the court's decision to the 2nd Circuit Court of Appeals in late February 2010, where the lower court's decision was affirmed. STN took its case to the Supreme Court of the United States, which in October 2010 denied to review the appellate decision.

== Etymology ==
Schaghticoke has various spellings: Pachgatgoch, Patchgatgoch, Pisgachtigok, Pishgachtigok, Scachtacook, Scaghkooke, Scanticook, Scatacook, Scaticook, Schaacticook, Scotticook, Seachcook, derived from an Algonquian Dialect-R word Pishgachtigok, meaning "the confluence of two waterways or "Gathered Waters." This may refer to the confluence of the Ten Mile River and the Housatonic River, where Mauwehu, the son of Chief Squantz, removed most of the Schaghticoke people. The language/culture base is Algonquian.

== Land issues ==
In 1724, colonial settlers from Fairfield, Connecticut, received approval from the General Assembly of the Colony of Connecticut to establish a new township. According to one account, they negotiated with Chief Squantz. Alternatively, it is told that they did not negotiate with Chief Squantz because he moved to the north end of Squantz Pond land area and refused to "sell" the township of New Fairfield. They returned in the Spring of 1725, but found that Chief Squantz had died during the Winter. His four sons and heirs refused to sign the deeds. It was not until four years later that the white men called "The Proprietors" finally got the drawn marks of several other native people who may not have had authority to sell the land. They "purchased" a 31,000-acre tract of land that is now called New Fairfield and Sherman, for the equivalent of about 300 dollars and on April 24, 1729, the deed was recorded on May 9, 1729, and is now deposited in the archives of the State Capitol in Hartford.

Granted a reserve in 1736 by the General Assembly of the Colony of Connecticut, the Schaghticoke tribe have one of the oldest reservations in the United States. But, today their original 2,500 acres (10 km^{2}), once located on both sides of the Housatonic River, has been diminished to a 400-acre (1.6 km^{2}) reservation on the west side of the river. It includes a wilderness habitat for rattlesnakes, ruffed grouse, and other animals. At one time, the Schaghticoke tribe owned land from the Massachusetts border to the Ten Mile River.

European-American agents, appointed by the state, sold off more than 2,000 acres of tribal land between 1801 and 1911 without approval by the federal government. Tribal leaders say that the land sales and takings violated the Indian Non-Intercourse Act. This is the collective name of six statutes passed from 1790 to 1834, which said that only the federal government had the right to deal directly with Indian nations and had to approve all land sales for them.

The Schaghticoke Tribal Nation (STN) has filed suits for restoration of about 2100 acres. Much of the land in question is in Kent, on the eastern side of the Housatonic River from the current reservation. About half the campus of the private Kent School is on the disputed land. Another major portion is owned by the Preston Mountain Club, a private fishing club.

The Schaghticoke filed land rights suits in 1985, 1998 and 2000, the last two under the name and leadership of the STN. By 2010, the cases were consolidated; the defendants were the federal government, the Connecticut Light & Power Company, and the Kent School. In 1993, the federal government had proposed a land swap to Connecticut, offering 25 acres of federal land in exchange for 49.7 acres of the reservation, as part of a major restoration of the Appalachian Trail and securing control of it. The STN objected to the state's making the exchange for a lesser amount of land, threatening to close access to the Trail through the reservation.

In October 2010 a federal court granted the defendants' request to dismiss the case, based on the argument of collateral estoppel. The judge held that, as the BIA had determined in 2005 that STN did not meet the criteria for federal recognition as a tribe, it could not establish a prima facie case for land rights. As it was not a tribe, the state could not have violated the Non-Intercourse Act with the land deals. Because another federal court had upheld the BIA's reversal of the STN's federal acknowledgment (see below), the defendants had argued that the STN could not proceed with its land case.

The Schaghticoke Tribal Nation appealed in federal court, arguing that a tribe does not have to be federally acknowledged to bring land claim lawsuits under the 1790 Non-Intercourse Act. At the end of November 2012, the 2nd Circuit Court of Appeals set February 25, 2013, as the deadline for the parties to submit their briefs in the land claims case.

In 2016 the Shaghticoke Tribal Nation filed suit in a Connecticut Superior Court against the state of Connecticut regarding tribal land that had been sold by the state beginning in 1801. In 2022, the Connecticut Appellate Court upheld the lower court's dismissal of the lawsuit, citing sovereign immunity and the language of a 1752 resolution of the Connecticut General Assembly that granted right of land use to the tribe for land along the Housatonic River, but did not explicitly grant property rights to the tribe and allowed for the land use only "during the pleasure of this Assembly".

== Quest for federal recognition ==
In 1981 the Schaghticoke Indian Tribe (SIT) filed a petition for federal recognition. The tribal genealogist had documented that four family lineages form the basis of most of today's tribal members. These are the Cogswells, Kilsons, Harrises and Bradleys. During the nascent stages of the Schaghticoke Tribal Nation's petition process, several individual leaders, both elected and from within the community, disputed the STN leadership. The result was a political dispute that has not been resolved.

Richard Velky is the chief of the Schaghticoke Tribal Nation who has been told by the BIA that they can not reform, regroup or reorganize and that the Schaghticoke Indian Tribe is the Historic continuation of the tribe; Alan Russell is the Tribal Chief of the S.I.T. and has been its leader since 1983. Neither represents all of the Schaghticoke people, including many who refuse to enroll with either political faction.

In December 2002, the BIA made a preliminary finding that the STN failed to satisfy two of seven criteria for recognition: proof of cohesive community and maintenance of a continuous political leadership. After the tribe provided more documentation in consultation with the agency, in January 2004 the Department of the Interior acknowledged the Schaghticoke Tribal Nation as an Indian tribe according to the federal law and practice. STN was the fourth Connecticut tribes to gain federal recognition after the Mashantucket Pequot Tribal Nation, the Mohegan Tribe and the Eastern Pequot Tribal Nation.

The Connecticut governor and other parties immediately opposed the Bureau of Indian Affairs decision, claiming adverse effects in communities due to the effects of gambling casinos. They feared the tribe would use recognition to press its land claims and to develop a casino. The Eastern Pequot Tribal Nation had received federal recognition in 2002, which the state was also opposing. The Mohegan Indian Tribe and Mashantucket Pequot had already developed increasingly successful, large casino resorts. In 2005, Representative Nancy Johnson introduced the "Schaghticoke Acknowledgement Repeal Act of 2005". Five requests were made to the Interior Board of Indian Appeals (IBIA) to review the BIA Final Determination to Acknowledge the STN, which had been approved on January 24, 2004. The five requesters were (1) the "Coggswell Group," a group of individuals described as "descendants of the historical tribe known today as the Schaghticoke Tribal Nation;" (2) the Town of Cornwall, Connecticut; (3) the State of Connecticut together with the Towns of Kent, Bethel, New Fairfield, Newtown, Ridgefield, Greenwich, Sherman, Westport, Wilton, and Weston as well as the Cities of Danbury and Stamford; the Kent School Corporation; the Connecticut Light and Power Company; and the Housatonic Valley Council of Elected Officials, (4) the Preston Mountain Club, Inc., a landowner; and (5) the Schaghticoke Indian Tribe, a group which has separately petitioned for Federal acknowledgment.

On May 12, 2005, the IBIA vacated the STN final determination and remanded it to the BIA for reconsideration. On October 11, 2005, the Office of Federal Acknowledgment (OFA) issued a Reconsidered Final Determination Denying Federal Acknowledgment of the STN. That same year, the IBIA also remanded the Eastern Pequot Tribal Nation's (EPTN) positive final determination of federal acknowledgment to the OFA. The result was the same, the Schaghticoke experience – OFA issued a determination denying the federal acknowledgment of EPTN.

STN appealed the BIA ruling, but in August 2009, federal Judge Peter Dorsey upheld it. The STN sued for relief in Federal court, but the suit was dismissed in August 2008. This ruling was appealed in the 2nd Circuit Court in New York and was denied on October 19, 2009. The STN had hoped to build a third gaming facility in Connecticut if they were federally acknowledged.

In 2015, the Bureau of Indian Affairs issued new rules saying that tribes which have previously been denied federal recognition cannot re-petition.

== Other legal issues ==
On January 29, 2009, STN members and supporters rallied at the Connecticut state capital. They presented a petition to Governor Jodi Rell, calling for an end to land encroachment on the reservation, and destruction of sites there. They wanted to raise awareness of the tribe's continued push to achieve federal recognition.

Chief Richard L. Velky, tribal chair of STN since 1987, has said, "I can tell you this. They will never finish us off, and they will never take our land."

In 2011, the two tribal groups briefly united in trying to get Michael Rost, a non-Schaghticoke, expelled from reservation land. Members of both STN and SIT have said that Rost, claiming to have the right to be there as a guest of a tribal member, took and sold lumber illegally, built roads without a permit, and destroyed sensitive archeological sites. They took him to court to get him evicted.

A Connecticut Superior Court evicted Rost that year. State Judge Corinne L. Klatt ruled that the Schaghticoke Tribal Nation and its leader Richard Velky were the legitimate representatives of the people: "Based on the evidence submitted by both parties, the court finds that the Schaghticoke Tribal Nation, through its Tribal Council, is the governing authority for the Schaghticoke Tribe.This ruling was reversed by Judge Klatt and the S.I.T. and Alan Russell were recognized as the authority on the reservation in Kent.Ct" Rost appealed the eviction order and on September 18, 2012, the appellate decision upheld Judge Klatt's eviction while correcting her determination that STN held tribal authority. Specifically, the appellate court held that, "The court nevertheless agreed to open its earlier decision for the limited purpose of vacating its finding that STN, through its tribal council, was the governing authority for the Schaghticoke Indians. The court clarified as follows: ‘‘It’s the Schaghticoke Indians that have the right to say who lives on the reservation. And they clearly have spoken here. Because both plaintiffs are in agreement that they do not want [the defendant] on the location.’’ The court later stated: ‘‘I am reopening my decision and clarifying my decision, that even if [Richard] Velky, in my analysis of the law, even if Velky is not the accepted and recognized tribal leader, nevertheless the plaintiffs—the plaintiffs being the Schaghticoke Indian—that—Indians, not the Schaghticoke Indian Tribe, not the Schaghticoke Tribal Nation, but the Indians that were originally recognized by this state, are the individuals that have brought this summary process action and have moved to evict [the defendant]. So, that’s the clarification of the court’s decision. Accordingly, the court modified that portion of its earlier decision finding that STN was the governing authority for the Schaghticoke Indians."

== Legacy ==
- The town of Schaghticoke, New York, is named for the tribe.
- The village of Schaghticoke, located in the above town, is named for the tribe.
- Schaghticoke Middle School in New Milford, Connecticut, is named for the tribe.
- Squantz Pond in New Fairfield, Connecticut, is named for Chief Squantz, a leader of the Schaghticoke people until his death in the winter of 1724–1725.
- Lake Waramaug in Warren and Washington, Connecticut, is named for Chief Waramaug, a leader of the Potatuck people from 1725 to 1735.
- The tribe influenced the name of Camp Scatico in Elizaville, New York.

== Notable members ==
- Truman Bradley (Native American)
- Trudie Lamb-Richmond

== See also ==
- Federally recognized tribes located within the boundaries of Connecticut:
  - Mashantucket Pequot Tribe
  - Mohegan
- State-recognized tribes located within the boundaries of Connecticut:
  - Schaghticoke Tribal Nation and Schaghticoke Indian Tribe (Politically split since 1983)
  - Eastern Pequot Tribal Nation
  - Golden Hill Paugussett Indian Nation
