= Waramaug =

Potatuck sachem (died 1735)

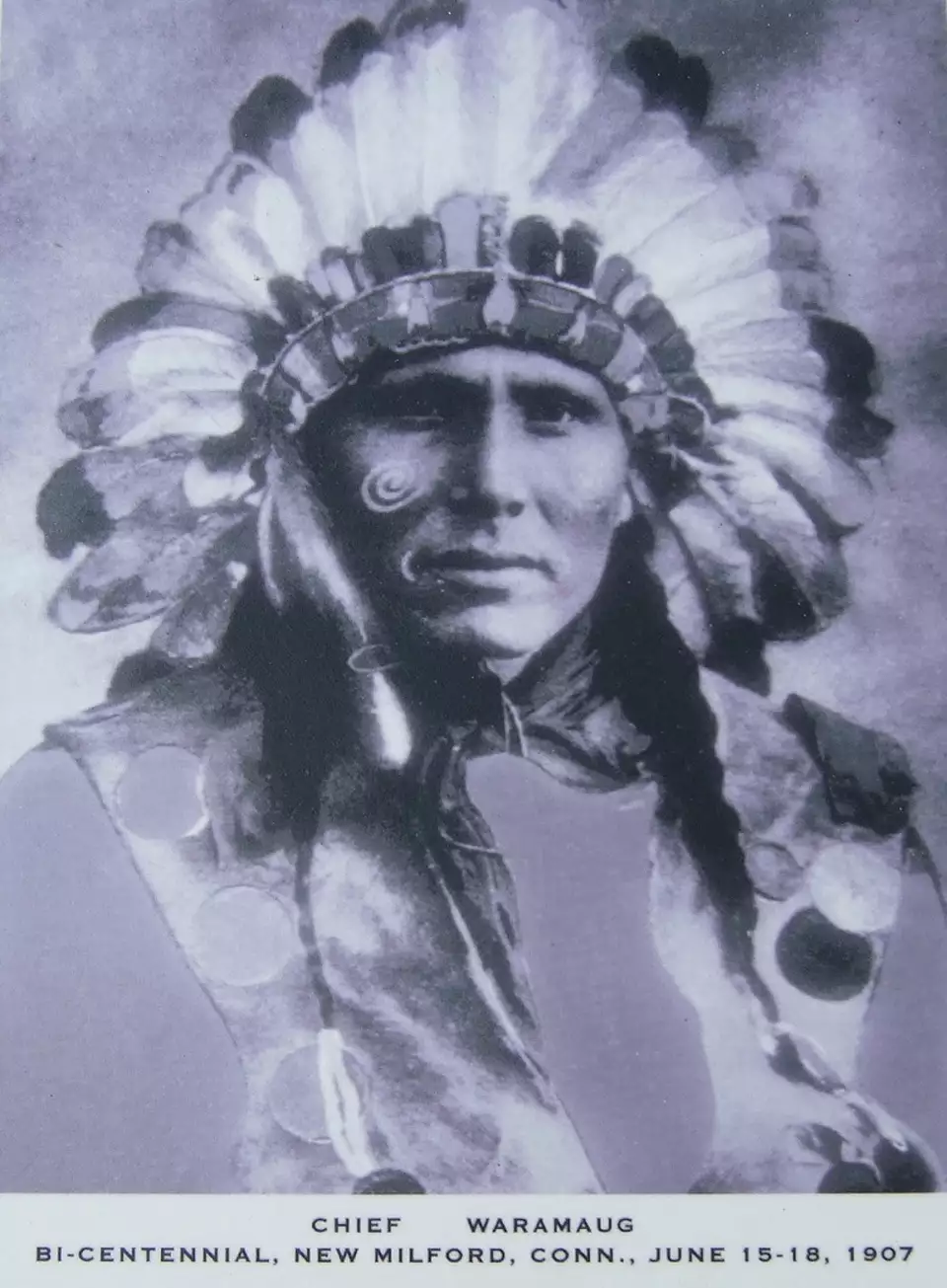
Chief Waramaug depicted on a postcard created for the 1907 New Milford Bicentennial

Waramaug, alternatively spelled Wehanonaug, was a sachem of the Potatuck Native American tribe, folded into the current Schaghticoke tribe, who lived along the length of the Housatonic River, until his death in 1735. He succeeded Squantz in 1725, and in turn was succeeded as sachemship of the Potatuck after his death by one of Chief Squantz's sons, Mauwehu.

According to Tomaino citing Smith, he ruled in a time when the Wepawaugs, Pequannocks, Paugassetts, and Pootatucks were reblending into a single tribe.

According to Tomaino citing Orcutt, "That Waramaug was 'the most potent prince of that or any other day in this colony,' is probably a very correct judgment, and would have been demonstrated had there been any occasion for Indian Wars, since he could have called into the field all the warriors of Western Connecticut."

== Legacy ==
A monument to Waramaug was erected after his death in 1735, near the gorge to the northeast of Falls Mountain.

Lake Waramaug is named after him. Lake Lillinonah is named for his daughter.
