= Squantz Pond =

Lake in New Fairfield, Connecticut

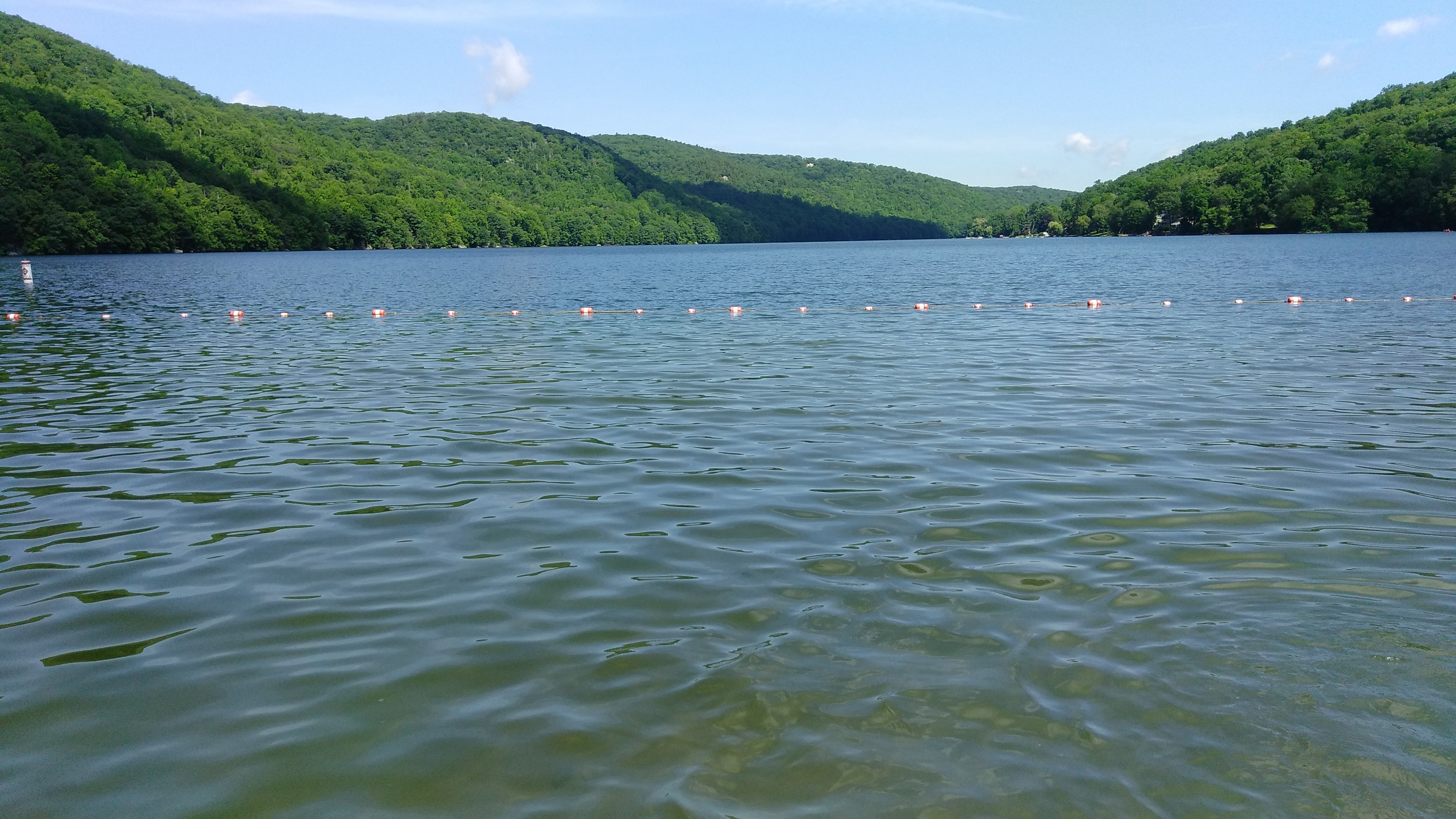
- Squantz Pond from the southern shore

- Location within Connecticut
- Location: New Fairfield, Connecticut
- Coordinates: 41.52°N 73.48°W
- Surface area: 288 acres (117 ha)
- Average depth: 22.9 ft (7.0 m)
- Max. depth: 47 ft (14 m)
- Water volume: 2,228,000,000 US gal (8.43×10^{9} L; 1.855×10^{9} imp gal)

Interactive map of Squantz Pond

Squantz Pond is a 288-acre lake in Fairfield County, Connecticut. It is located on the town line of Sherman and New Fairfield, and is bordered by manmade Candlewood Lake. The south shore is protected as Squantz Pond State Park (established in 1926), and is managed by the Connecticut Department of Energy and Environmental Protection. The pond is named for Chief Squantz, a leader of the Schaghticoke tribe.

== Characteristics ==
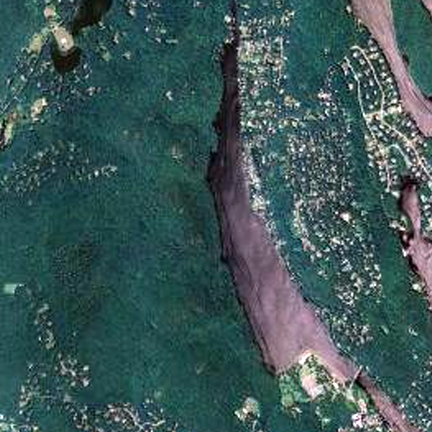
NASA satellite photo of Squantz Pond

Before 1929, Squantz Pond was recorded to be 65 acres (26 ha) in area. However, the 1921 discovery of a 22 foot-long canoe at the bottom of the lake led historians to speculate that it was once a larger body of water.

After the creation of Candlewood Lake in 1929, the size and depth of Squantz Pond increased. It was one of four ponds that formed the larger lake basin, including Barse Pond, Creek Pond, and Neversink Pond. Squantz Pond is now separated from the rest of Candlewood Lake by a causeway.

The watershed of Squantz Pond is 3,667 acres (1,484 ha), much of which is undeveloped. Lake Mauweehoo is located in the watershed. Squantz Pond is fed by Glen Brook. In 1980, it was classified as being a mesotrophic lake.

== Ecology ==
Squantz Pond is home to a diverse variety of fish. Common species include walleye, yellow perch, white perch, chain pickerel, largemouth bass, brown bullhead, yellow bullhead, banded killifish, spottail shiner, rock bass, redbreast sunfish, bluegill, and pumpkinseed. Rarer species found in Squantz Pond include smallmouth bass, black crappie, black bullhead, and golden shiner. The lake is stocked with brown trout and rainbow trout. Alewives were introduced by 1973.

Aquatic plant communities have historically included Ceratophyllum, Vallisneria, and Potamogeton. A 2011 study found 11 species within Squantz Pond, including native coontail (Ceratophyllum demersum), western waterweed (Elodea nuttallii), and slender naiad (Najas flexilis). Two invasive species, Eurasian watermilfoil (Myriophyllum spicatum) and minor naiad (Najas minor), were also found.

Shallow water communities include plants such as waterwort (Elatine), spikerush (Eleocharis), pickerelweed (Pontederia cordata), snailseed pondweed (Potamogeton bicupulatus), bur-reed (Sparganium), and cattail (Typha).

Sterile grass carp were released into the lake in 2017 to combat the spread of the invasive Eurasian watermilfoil. By 2019, the lake had lost almost all of its vegetation. Although reports have not confirmed a correlation, it has been theorized that the carp have consumed all accessible plants.

== Recreation ==
Squantz Pond State Park covers 172 acres of the southwestern shore of the lake. The park offers swimming, fishing, and scuba diving, and motorized boating. Cliff jumping into the lake is outlawed.

Blue-green algae blooms are frequent, and it is common for water quality issues to close the lake to swimmers.
