= Eastern Pequot Tribal Nation =

State-recognized tribe in Connecticut, U.S.

- Location of the Eastern Pequot state reservation
- Named after: Pequot people
- Type: state-recognized tribe
- Tax ID no.: EIN 06-1362735 (Wuttooantam Foundation)
- Headquarters: North Stonington, Connecticut
- Members: 1,150 (2003)
- Official language: English
- Subsidiaries: Eastern Pequot Nation Wuttooantam Foundation
- Affiliations: National Congress of American Indians
- Revenue: $710 (foundation) (2019)
- Expenses: $1.2k (foundation) (2019)
- Website: easternpequottribalnation.org

The Eastern Pequot Tribal Nation is a state-recognized tribe in Connecticut. The tribe descends from the Pequot people of southeastern New England.

In 2002, the Secretary of the Interior granted recognition to the Eastern Pequot Tribal Nation (EPTN) after approving a union between the Eastern Pequot and Paucatuck Eastern Pequot which had submitted separate petitions for recognition. In 2005, the Department of Interior revoked recognition after Bureau of Indian Affairs review. In 2012, the EPTN filed a federal lawsuit seeking to overturn the BIA/Department of Interior revocation.

== History ==
=== 16th century ===
The Pequot people today are descended from the tribe that was the dominant power in southeastern New England in the 1600s. That power declined sharply following the Pequot War in 1637, and many surviving Pequots were assigned to the supervision of the Mohegan tribe in the west and Narragansett people in the eastern part of the region. The Bureau of Indian Affairs stated in 2002: "Those Pequots whom the colonial government removed from the supervision of the Eastern Niantic sachem Ninigret in 1654 were subsequently governed by two Indian rulers: Harmon Garrett and Momoho. The Colony of Connecticut purchased the Lantern Hill land for Momoho's Pequots in 1683. Since then there has been an unbroken history of state recognition and a reservation for this tribe."

The Eastern Pequots are descended from those Pequots who escaped from the Narragansetts and returned to their traditional territory. In 1683, they were given a reservation on Lantern Hill in North Stonington, Connecticut by the colonial government. Today it is approximately 224 acres.

=== 20th century ===
Those Pequots who returned from Mohegan supervision in the west were led by Harmon Garrett, and the colony gave them a reservation near Ledyard, Connecticut where they became known as the Western Pequots, or Mashantucket Pequots. Both groups intermarried with members of other ethnic groups through the centuries but maintained cultural continuity through their practices of traditional crafts and customs. By the 20th century, most descendants were multi-racial, while some identified themselves as Pequot. However, by the 1930s, the tribe began to be divided over questions of identity, aggravated by competition for resources and limited space on the Eastern Pequot Reservation. There were racially based conflicts between darker- and lighter-skinned descendants among both the Eastern Pequots and the Mashantucket Pequots in this period. An Eastern Pequot chief in the 1930s challenged the membership rights of dark-skinned descendants of one Tamar Brushel, an early 19th-century resident of the reservation. Others denied membership to dark-skinned descendants of Emmanuel Sebastian, a Brazilian mulatto immigrant who was living in the Portuguese Cape Verde Islands. Both men had married Pequot women in the 19th century, and their descendants were considered tribal members.

== Wuttooantam Foundation ==
The Eastern Pequot Tribal Nation incorporated the Eastern Pequot Nation Wuttooantam Foundation as a 501(c)(3) nonprofit organization in 2015. The foundation is based in North Stonington, Connecticut, and Roy A. Sebastian has served as its registered agent.

== Quest for federal recognition ==
The Eastern Pequots started seeking federal recognition in 1979. In 1990, about 150 members initiated a separate petition for federal recognition as the Paucatuck Eastern Pequot tribe, but most members of both groups have continued to live on the 224-acre reservation.

The Eastern Pequots contended that they satisfied federal criteria:

- they had maintained identification as an Indian tribe within the community
- they have been a distinct community
- they maintained political authority over members
- the current members are descended from members of a historical Indian tribe
- a majority of members lived on or near the reservation and had family ties

In 1998, the Bureau of Indian Affairs was reviewing both petitions together. Ronald Wolf Jackson, the treasurer of the Eastern Pequot, characterized the groups' differences as a "leadership dispute" and said that a "fair review" of their petitions would demonstrate that there was one tribe. Some supporters of the Paucatuck contended that the Eastern Pequot wanted a casino gaming deal, although both groups denied interest in a casino.

In March 2000, the BIA recommended recognition of the tribes in its preliminary finding. During its final review, the BIA encouraged the two groups to reunite, noting that the historical evidence showed that they were members of one tribe with common ancestors and history on the shared reservation. In June 2002, the Secretary of the Interior granted recognition to the Eastern Pequot Tribal Nation. Richard Blumenthal, the Attorney General of Connecticut, filed an appeal with the Interior Board of Indian Appeals the following October, worried that the tribe would develop a third casino in the state, and Connecticut officials contended that the BIA had erred in granting recognition to the united tribe.

The BIA revoked their recognition in 2005, after additional internal review. They had already revoked recognition of the Schaghticoke Tribal Nation in Connecticut, which it had recognized in 2004. In January 2012, the Eastern Pequots filed a lawsuit in the US District Court in Washington, D.C. seeking to reinstate the BIA's recognition. State and local leaders had opposed recognition because they believed that the tribe would develop a large casino, and they were concerned about the adverse effects of such operations on local communities. The Eastern Pequot's reservation is near the Foxwoods Resort operated by the Mashantucket Pequot tribe. However, the BIA issued new rules in 2015 saying that tribes cannot re-petition if they have already been denied federal recognition. The tribe has not pursued seeking recognition through the United States Congress due to anti-gaming sentiments in the Northeast, which would make passage unlikely at this time.

== Reunited Eastern Pequots and Donald Trump ==
On May 28, 2003 Donald Trump filed a lawsuit against the reunited tribes, claiming he had been excluded from their development plans. During the split, he had contracted with the smaller Pawcatuck Eastern Pequot faction. The reunited tribe selected a different developer for their deal.
