= Mashantucket Pequot Tribe =

American Indian tribe in the state of Connecticut

Coordinates: 41°27′58″N 71°58′28″W

Mashantucket Pequot Indian Tribe
Total population
- Enrolled members: 1,086

Regions with significant populations
- United States (Connecticut)

Languages
- English, Pequot language

Religion
- Christianity

Related ethnic groups
- Mohegan and Eastern Pequot Tribal Nation

The Mashantucket Pequot Indian Tribe, also known as the Mashantucket Pequot Tribal Nation, is a federally recognized American Indian tribe in the state of Connecticut. They are descended from the Pequot people, an Algonquian-language tribe that dominated the southern New England coastal areas, and they own and operate Foxwoods Resort Casino within their reservation in Ledyard, Connecticut. As of 2018, Foxwoods Resort Casino is one of the largest casinos in the world in terms of square footage, casino floor size, and number of slot machines, and it was one of the most economically successful in the United States until 2007, but it became deeply in debt by 2012 due to its expansion and changing conditions.

The tribe was federally recognized in 1983 through the Mashantucket Pequot Land Claims Settlement Act. The federal land claims suit was brought by the tribe against the State of Connecticut and the federal government, charging that the tribe had been illegally deprived of its land through state actions that were not ratified by the Senate. As part of the settlement of this suit, Congress gave federal recognition to the tribe, in addition to approving financial compensation so that the tribe could repurchase lost land. Tribal membership is based on proven lineal descent of 11 Pequot families whose ancestors were listed in the 1900 US Census.

The Mashantucket Pequot tribe is one of two federally recognized tribes in Connecticut, the other being the Mohegan Indian Tribe.

== Geography ==
The Mashantucket Pequot Indian Reservation is located in Mashantucket, Connecticut, in southeastern Connecticut's New London County near the Thames River. It is held in trust for the tribe by the Bureau of Indian Affairs (BIA). The tribe also owns land in the adjacent towns of Ledyard, Preston and North Stonington, as well as in New London.

== Demographics and citizenship ==
Today, the Mashantucket Pequot population consists of more than 1100 enrolled citizens. As a federally recognized tribe, the Mashantucket Pequots have the authority to determine their citizenship criteria. The tribe requires its citizens to be of proven lineal descent from 11 Mashantucket Pequot ancestors listed in the U.S. censuses of 1900 and 1910. In 1996, tribal citizens voted to close enrollment, with the exception of children born to currently enrolled tribal citizens.

The 2000 census showed a resident population of 325 persons living on reservation land, 227 of whom identified themselves as American Indian, while others identify themselves as having more than one ethnicity, including non-Pequot spouses. Since that time, the tribe expanded reservation housing, and members continue to relocate to the reservation as housing becomes available.

All Mashantucket Pequot citizens are of mixed Native and non-Native ancestry, with some citizens having ancestry from multiple non-Native ethnicities. Due to a history of intermarriage between Black and Pequot people, many citizens of the tribe have both Pequot and African ancestry. Others may outwardly appear white. A 1995 article in The New York Times stated that "There are white Pequots and black Pequots and the tensions between them are no different from those in society at large".

== Government ==
Representative Deb Haaland with Board Chair Rodney A. Butler speaking about Indigenous People's Day in 2019.

As of 2020, the Mashantucket Pequot Elders Council officers are:

- Chair—Marjorie Colebut-Jackson
- Vice-chair—Shirley "Laughing Woman" Patrick
- Secretary/Treasurer-Anthony Sebastian

The seven members of the Mashantucket Pequot Tribal Council are:

- Chair—Rodney A. Butler
- Vice-chair—Latoya Cluff
- Secretary—Matthew Pearson
- Treasurer—Merrill Reels
- Councilor—Daniel Menihan
- Councilor—Crystal Whipple
- Councilor—Michele Scott

The current administration's seven-member council has stated that the tribe's priorities are protecting tribal sovereignty, focusing on the educational, emotional, and physical well-being of members, and working to leverage the tribe's financial and economic strengths through partnership initiatives, both locally and abroad. Mashantucket Pequot's local investments include the Lake of Isles golf course and the Spa at Norwich Inn, both of which have proven to be positive additions to local municipal tax bases.

Council members are elected by popular vote of the tribal membership to three-year, staggered terms. There are roughly 600 eligible voting members of the tribe, which numbered 1086 in 2018. Tribal Members must be at least 18 years old and in good standing with the tribe to be eligible to vote.

== Chairman ==
- Richard Arthur Hayward (1975–1998)
- Kenneth M. Reels (1998–2003)
- Michael Thomas (2003–2009)
- Rodney Butler (2010–present)

== Economy ==
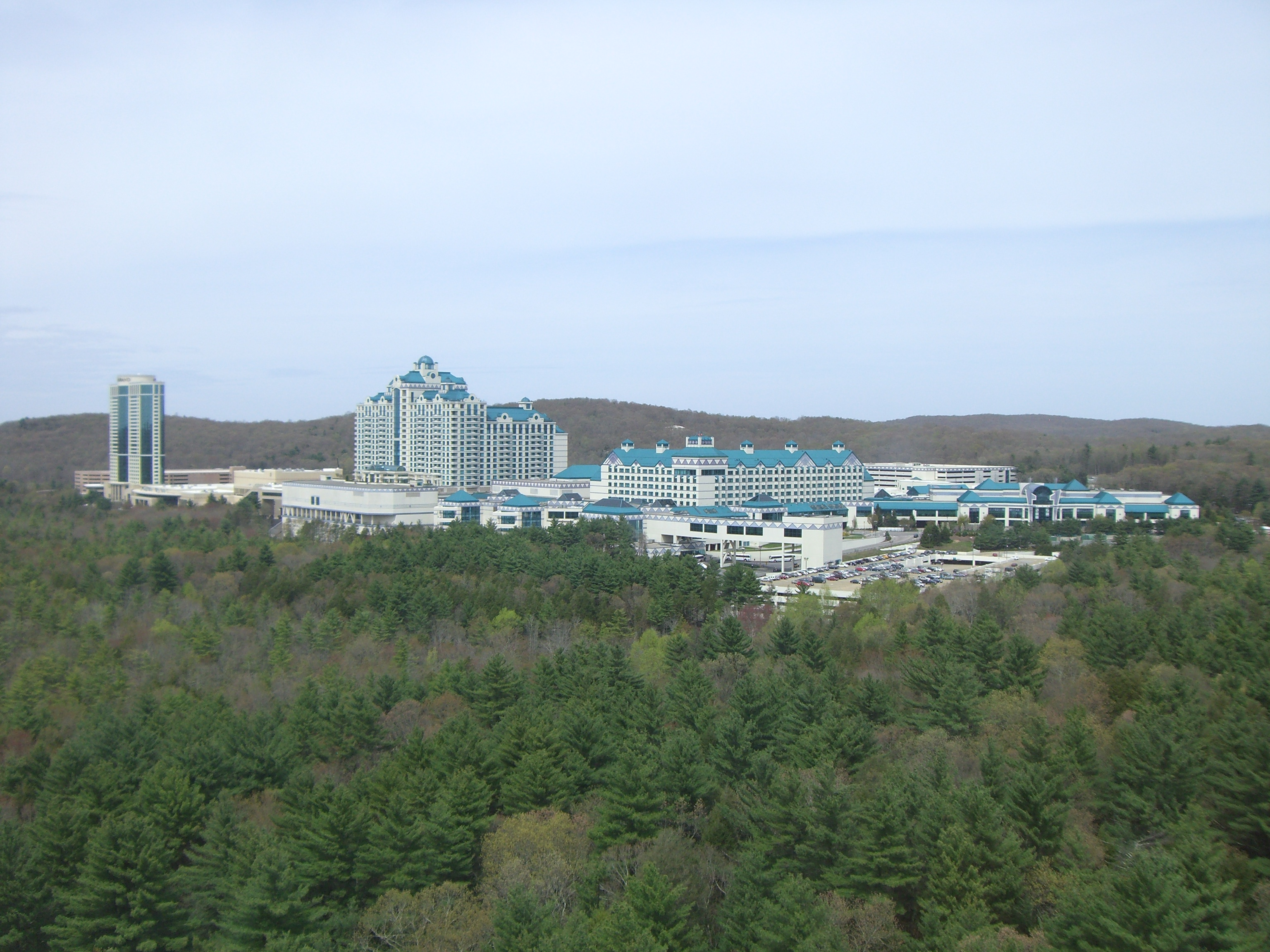
Foxwoods Resort & Casino, 2009

The Mashantucket Pequots have owned and operated one of the largest resort casinos in the world since 1992. The University of Connecticut analyzed the Foxwoods casino's effects on the Connecticut economy, and their report stated that it had a positive economic impact on the neighboring towns of Ledyard, Preston, and North Stonington, as well as the state of Connecticut, which has received more than $4 billion in slot revenue.

== History ==
The Mashantucket Pequots are descendants of the historic Pequot tribe, an Algonquian-speaking people who dominated the coastal area from the Niantic River of Connecticut east to the Pawcatuck River which forms a border with Rhode Island, and south to Long Island Sound. A second descendant group is the Eastern Pequot Tribal Nation, which is not recognized by the Federal government.

During the colonial years, colonists recorded inter-tribal warfare, shifts in boundaries, and changes in power among the tribes. Scholars believe that the Pequots migrated from the upper Hudson River Valley into central and eastern Connecticut around 1500. William Hubbard wrote Narrative of the Troubles with the Indians in New-England in 1667 to explore the ferocity with which the Pequot tribe had attacked the colonists. He described them as invaders from "the interior of the continent" who "by force seized upon one of the places near the sea, and became a Terror to all their Neighbors." Contemporary scholars suggest that archaeological, linguistic, and documentary evidence show that the Pequots were indigenous for centuries in the Connecticut Valley before the arrival of settlers.

By the time that Plymouth Colony and the Massachusetts Bay colony were being established, the Pequots had established military dominance among Indian tribes in central and eastern Connecticut. They numbered some 16,000 in the most densely inhabited portion of southern New England. The smallpox epidemic of 1616–19 killed roughly 90-percent of the Indians on the eastern coast of New England, but it failed to reach the Pequot, Niantic and Narragansett tribes, and this assisted the Pequots in their rise to dominance. But the Massachusetts smallpox epidemic in 1633 devastated the region's Indian population, and historians estimate that the Pequots suffered the loss of 80-percent of their entire population. By the outbreak of the Pequot War in 1637, their numbers may have been reduced to about 3,000 in total.

=== Pequot War ===
In 1637, Connecticut and Massachusetts Bay colonies overwhelmed the Pequots during the Pequot War. This followed the Indians' attack on Wethersfield, Connecticut, that left several settlers dead. The military force of the two colonies was led by John Mason and John Underhill, and they launched an assault on the Pequot stronghold at Mystic, Connecticut, killing a significant portion of the Pequot population.

The colonists enslaved some of the surviving Pequots, sending some to the West Indies as labor on sugar cane plantations, putting others to indentured servitude as household servants in New England. Most of the survivors, however, were transferred to the Mohegan and Narragansett tribes. A few Pequots returned to the reservation years later, and they intermarried with the colonists. Many of the Pequot descendants, while multi-racial, retained a sense of culture and continuity.

Location of the Mashantucket Pequot Reservation in Connecticut

=== Present day ===
The Mashantucket Pequot reservation was created by the Connecticut Colony in 1666, but only 13 people lived on the reservation by the time of the 1910 United States census. Elizabeth George (1894–1973) was one of the last Pequot living on the reservation and, when she died in 1973, the federal government started planning to reclaim the land which they presumed would be vacated upon the deaths of the last remaining Pequot residents.

Richard "Skip" Hayward, a grandson of Elizabeth George, led the tribe's efforts in filing a federal land claims suit against the state of Connecticut which challenged the state's sale of 800 acres (320 ha) of reservation lands—an event which had occurred more than 100 years earlier in 1855. The state of Connecticut agreed with the tribe, and the US Department of Justice entered the suit, as it dealt with federal issues and the legality of the state action.

On October 18, 1983, President Ronald Reagan signed the Connecticut Indian Land Claims Settlement Act which included federal recognition of the Mashantucket Pequot tribe. They were the eighth American Indian tribe to gain federal recognition through an act of Congress rather than through the administrative process of the Bureau of Indian Affairs (BIA) and Department of Interior. The Mashantucket Pequots have since added to their land holdings by purchase and placed the additional lands into trust with the BIA on behalf of the tribe. As of the 2000 census, their total land area was 2.17 square miles (1,390 acres)/5.6 km2.

In 1994, the tribe purchased, and later developed further, what is now known as The Spa at Norwich Inn in Norwich, Connecticut.

== Controversies ==
The Bureau of Indian Affairs had established criteria by which tribes seeking recognition had to document cultural and community continuity, a political organization, and related factors. Among the criteria are having to prove continuous existence as a recognized community since 1900, with internal government and tribal rules for membership.

In 1993, Donald Trump said that the owners of Foxwoods casino "did not look like real Indians." He became a key investor with the Paucatuck Eastern Pequots who were seeking federal recognition.

In his book Without Reservation: The Making of America's Most Powerful Indian Tribe and Foxwoods the World's Largest Casino (2001), Jeff Benedict argues that the Mashantuckets are not descended from the historical Pequot tribe, but rather from the Narragansett people. Spokesmen for the Pequots denounced the book and asserted that Benedict's genealogical research was inherently flawed, as it failed to reflect the correct descendant lineages for the Mashantucket Pequot people identified on the 1900 and 1910 U.S. Censuses. Laurence Hauptman argued with Benedict's assertions on the genealogy of current members, and anthropologist Katherine A. Spilde also criticized it.

== Tribal citizenship rules ==
The Mashantucket Pequot tribe receives numerous requests from individuals applying for admission as members. They base tribal membership on an individual proving descent, by recognized genealogical documentation, from one or more members of eleven families included on the 1900 U.S. census of the tribe.

Each federally recognized tribe has the authority to set its own membership/citizenship rules. Their descent rules are similar to the Cherokee Nation's reliance on proven direct descent from those Cherokee listed in the early 20th-century Dawes Rolls. CBS News reported in May 2000 that the tribal membership had voted to drop the requirement that tribal applicants have a minimum percentage of Mashantucket Pequot blood. However, the tribe has since begun to require genetic testing of newborn children whose parents are tribal members, to establish maternity and paternity.

== Foxwoods Resort Casino ==
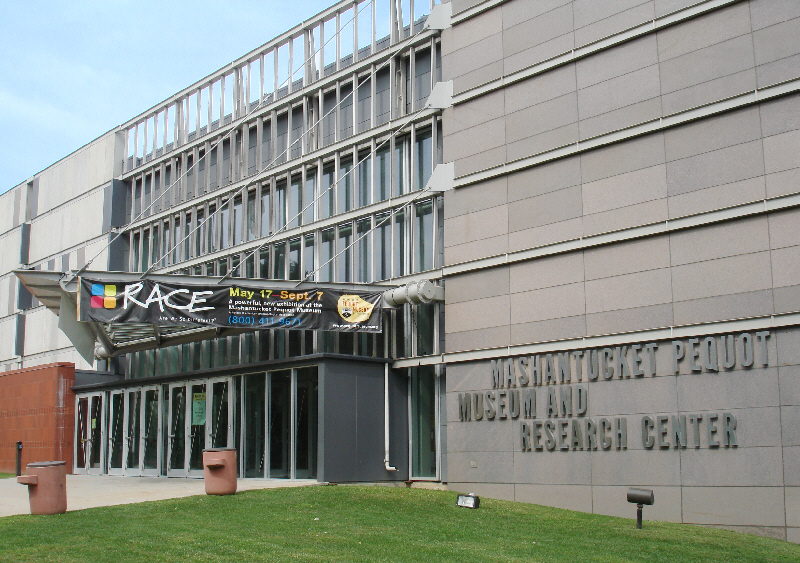
Mashantucket Pequot Museum Exterior

In 1986, Skip Hayward and financial backers built a high-stakes bingo hall on reservation land, and later they added other facilities. In 1992, the Mashantucket Pequots opened Foxwoods Resort Casino, which is now one of the largest casinos in the world. Adjacent to Foxwoods is the Mashantucket Pequot Museum and Research Center which interprets Pequot history and culture. The museum hosts local and international indigenous artists and musicians, as well as mounting changing exhibits of artifacts throughout the year.

== See also ==
- Connecticut Indian Land Claims Settlement
- Foxwoods Resort Casino
- Indian gaming
- Indian Gaming Regulatory Act
- Mashantucket Pequot Reservation Archeological District, a U.S. National Historic Landmark
- Wetu
