= Ten Mile River (Housatonic River tributary) =

River in New York, USA

Coordinates: 41.6659°N 73.5068°W

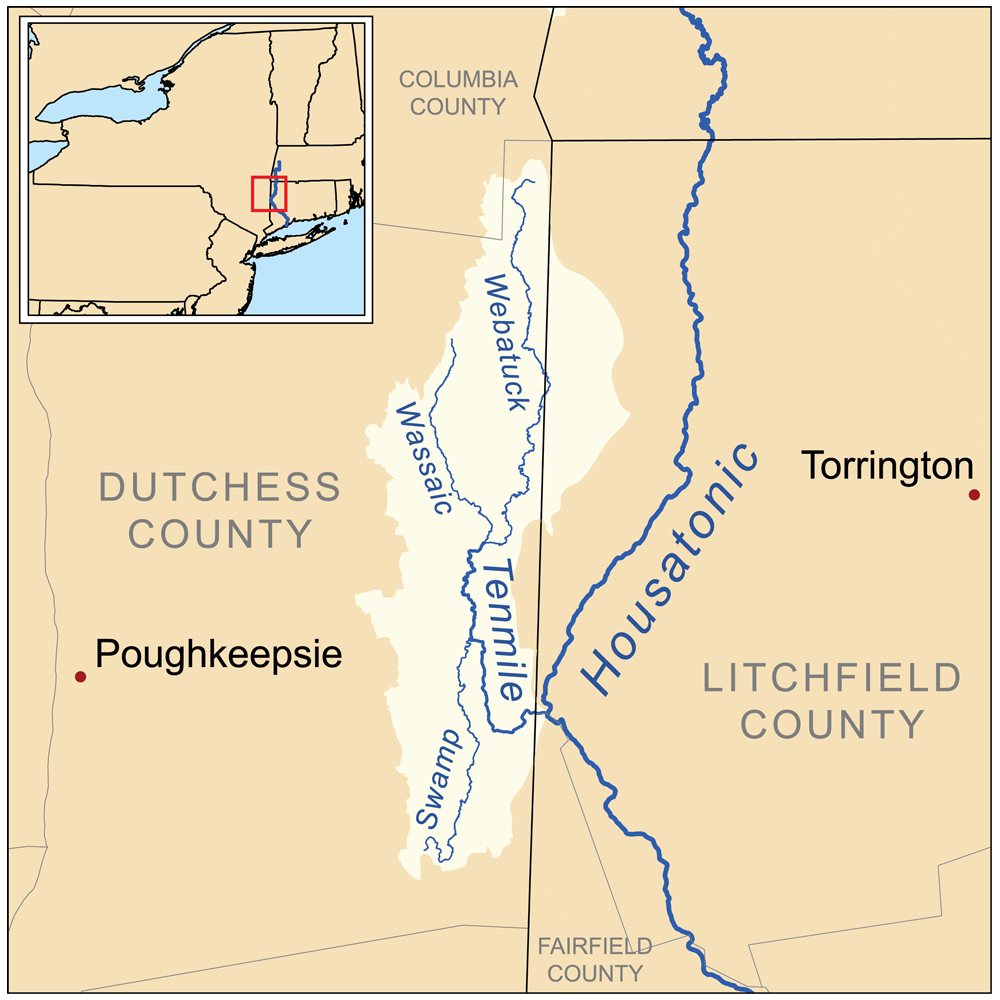
Map of the Ten Mile River drainage basin.

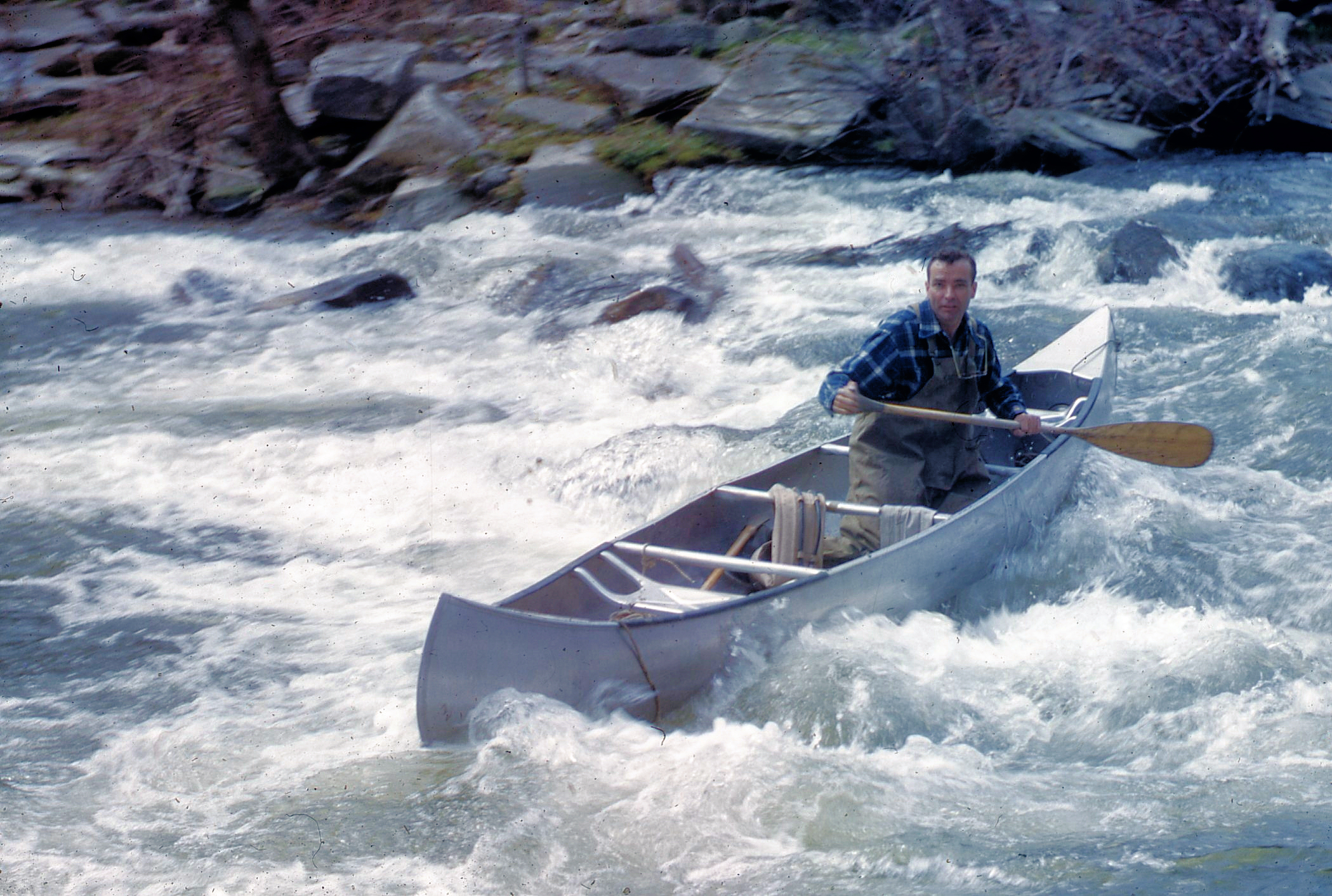
Corny King canoeing on Tenmile River, Apr 29, 1951, on an Appalachian Mountain Club trip.

The Ten Mile River (Tenmile River on federal maps) is a 15.4-mile-long (24.8 km) river that flows through Dutchess County, New York, into westernmost Connecticut. The river is formed in the town of Amenia, New York, at the confluence of Webatuck Creek and Wassaic Creek. The Ten Mile River runs south through the town of Dover, New York before turning east and crossing into Connecticut, where it forms the boundary between the towns of Kent and Sherman for one-half mile before flowing into the Housatonic River. This is a popular whitewater paddling destination with mostly quickwater and a few whitewater areas reaching up to Class III.

== See also ==
- List of rivers of Connecticut
- List of rivers of New York
