= Schaghticoke Tribal Nation =

Faction of a state-recognized tribe in Connecticut

- Headquarters: Litchfield County, Connecticut
- Location: Kent, Connecticut, United States
- Official language: English
- Website: schaghticoke.com

The Schaghticoke Tribal Nation (STN) is a faction of the state-recognized Schagticoke tribe in Connecticut. It is not a federally recognized tribe. STN is a distinct entity from the Schaghticoke Indian Tribe (SIT), another faction of the state-recognized tribe.

== History ==
The Schaghticoke Tribal Nation (STN) has sought federal recognition since 1981. In 1986, Schaghticoke Tribe divided politically into STN and Schaghticoke Indian Tribe (SIT). Both STN and SIT are factions of "the Schagticoke", which is state-recognized in Connecticut as a tribe, but is not federally recognized. STN was granted federal recognition in 2004. However, federal recognition for STN was revoked in 2005. STN has pursued restoration of their federal recognition. In 2015, STN was informed by the Bureau of Indian Affairs that they could not re-petition for federal recognition.

== Housatonic River pollution ==
The Schaghticoke Tribal Nation state reservation is located along the Housatonic River, which is polluted with PCBs manufactured by Monsanto and put into the river by General Electric from their electrical transformer factory in Pittsfield, Massachusetts. This limits the use of the river and presents health risks to those who live along river, and local residents cannot eat the fish from the river.

== See also ==
- Schaghticoke people
- State-recognized tribes in the United States
