= Lake Waubeeka =

- Gated community
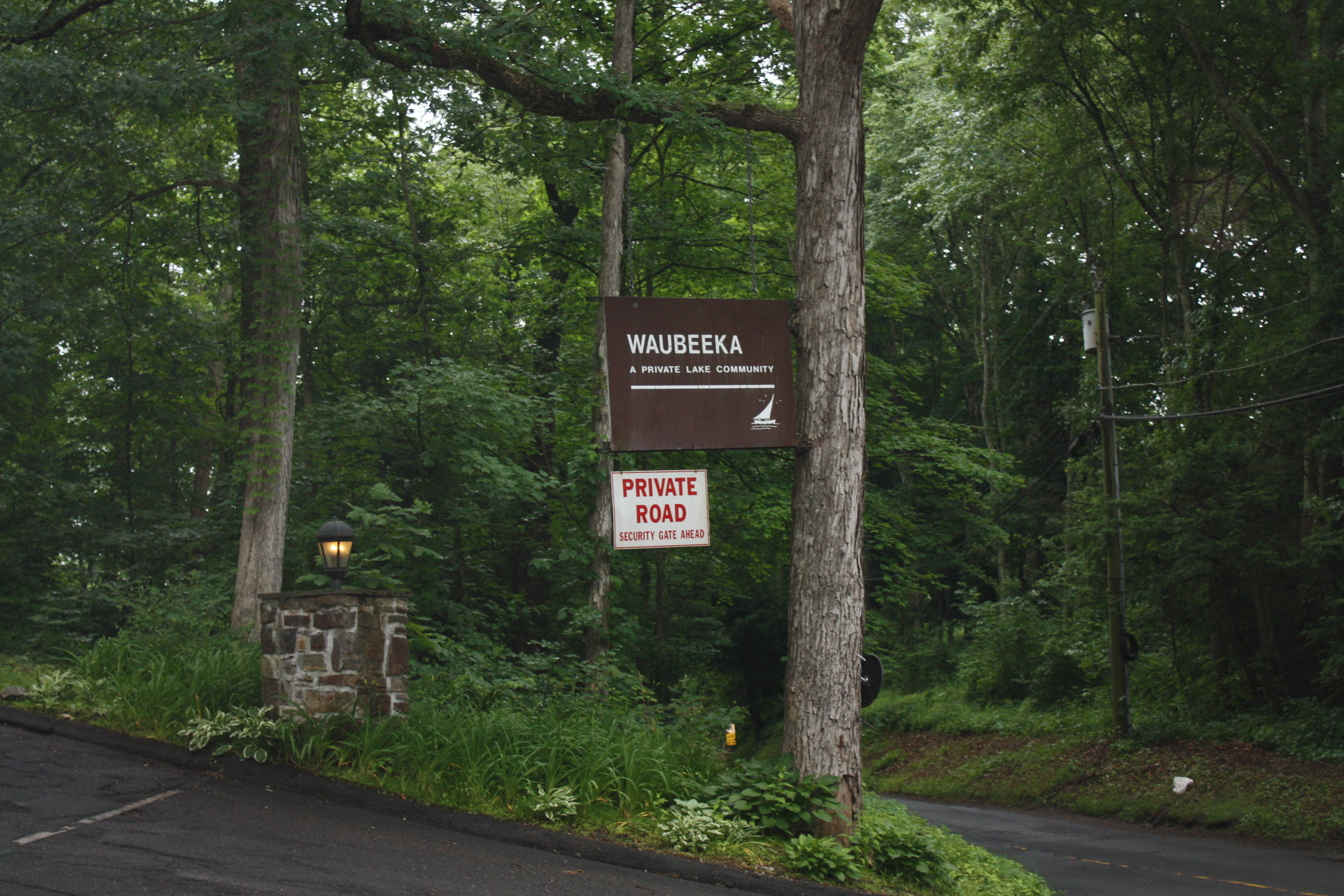

- Location within Danbury, Connecticut Lake Waubeeka (the United States)
- Coordinates: 41.3497608°N 73.4587875°W
- Country: United States
- State: Connecticut
- County: Fairfield County
- City: Danbury

Area
  - Land: 0.95 sq mi (2.45 km^{2})
  - Water: 0.077 sq mi (0.20 km^{2})
- Elevation: 712 ft (217 m)
- Time zone: UTC– 05:00 (Eastern)
  - Summer (DST): UTC– 04:00 (EDT)
- ZIP Code: 06810
- Area code: 203
- GNIS feature ID: 211874
- Website: https://lakewaubeeka.org/

Lake Waubeeka is a man-made lake previously owned and created by Hiram Kellogg and later sold to eventually become a private community in the Starrs Plain section of Danbury, Fairfield County, Connecticut, United States.

== History ==
Originally a summer colony, the lake community was established by a group of Jewish New York City firefighters, known as the Ner Tamid Society, in 1951. Only a year prior, the group had set up the organization (Lake Tormid Inc.) that would complete the endeavor. Previous to this, the Lake Waubeeka property had been used as a campsite for the Boy Scouts. Although there were initial plans to rename the lake to "Lake Tormid," the decision was made to keep the original Waubeeka, which is said to be an Indigenous term for "high water."

In 1952 construction began on the 200 original bungalows, which were quite small and barren at the time. By 1954 all 8 roads that make up the community were completed. The streets were named after the children of Tormid Lake Inc.'s original board of directors. Most notably, Carol Street is named after Sidney Klein's daughter, Carole King, in the original spelling of her first name.

By the 1970s Lake Waubeeka started to become a year-round residential community, one that was no longer historically Jewish.

== Geography ==
Lake Waubeeka is located at Moses Mountain, directly southeast of Wooster Mountain State Park along Ives Trail, north of the town of Redding and northeast of Ridgefield.

The lake itself occupies 36 acres (15 ha) and has a maximum depth of 21 feet (6.4 m). The shoreline is almost completely developed, with the exception of two small beaches.

The primary inflow into Waubeeka Lake originates from West Redding Brook, from which a small stream meets the eastern dam at Carol Street. Outflow from the lake originally fed into the Saugatuck River to the south, however, after the flood of 1955, it was diverted north into Kissen Brook toward the Still River. This diversion has created problems for neighboring Miry Brook, specifically related to flooding at the Danbury Airport.

There are 550 acres of undeveloped woodlands at Lake Waubeeka. A hiking trail, which formally became known as the "Nature Trail" in 1967, is a dirt path that begins slightly north of the east dam and leads up to a beaver pond. Nowadays the trail is referred to as "Beaver Pond Trail."
