= Danbury, Connecticut =

Danbury
- City
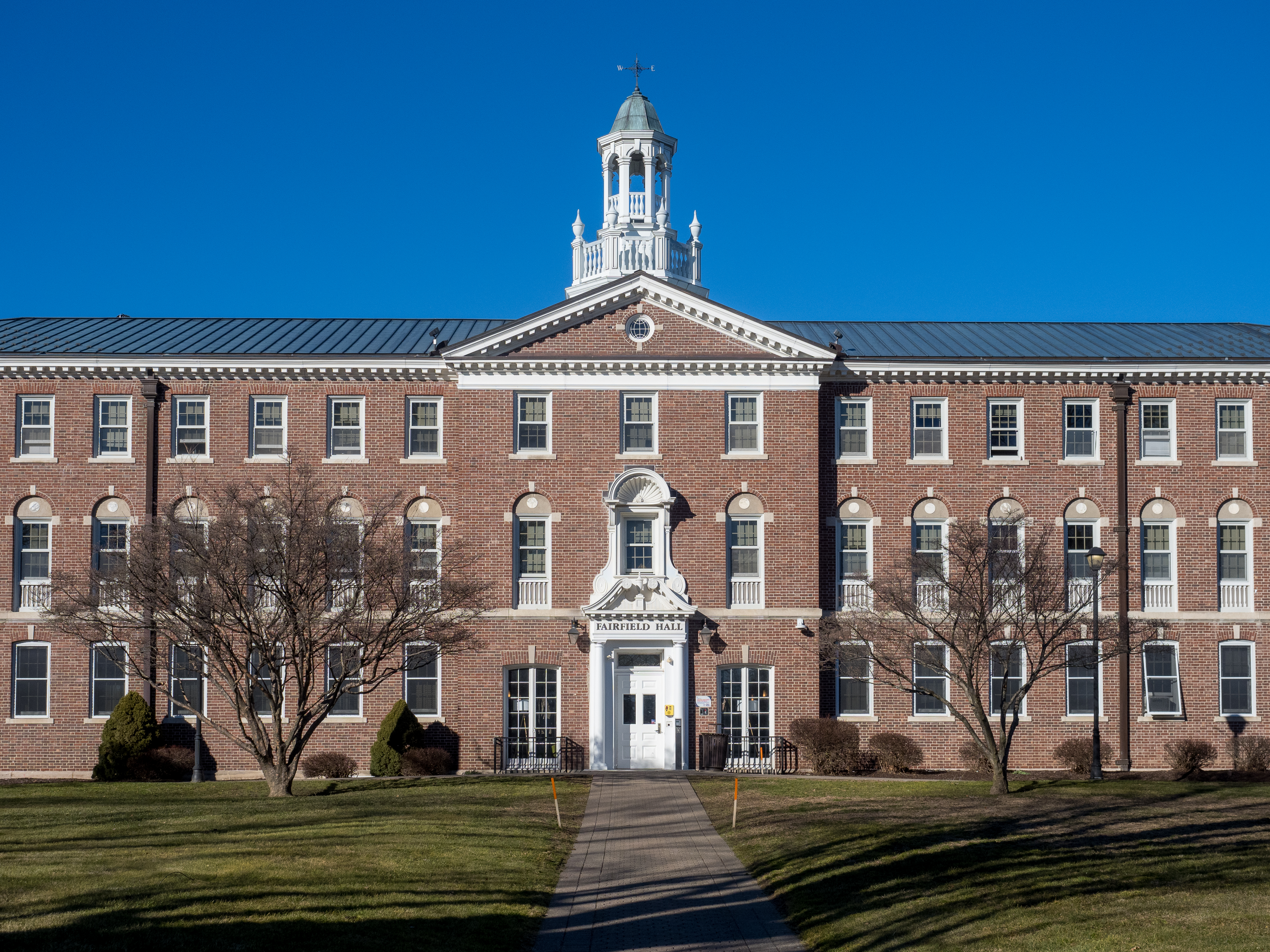
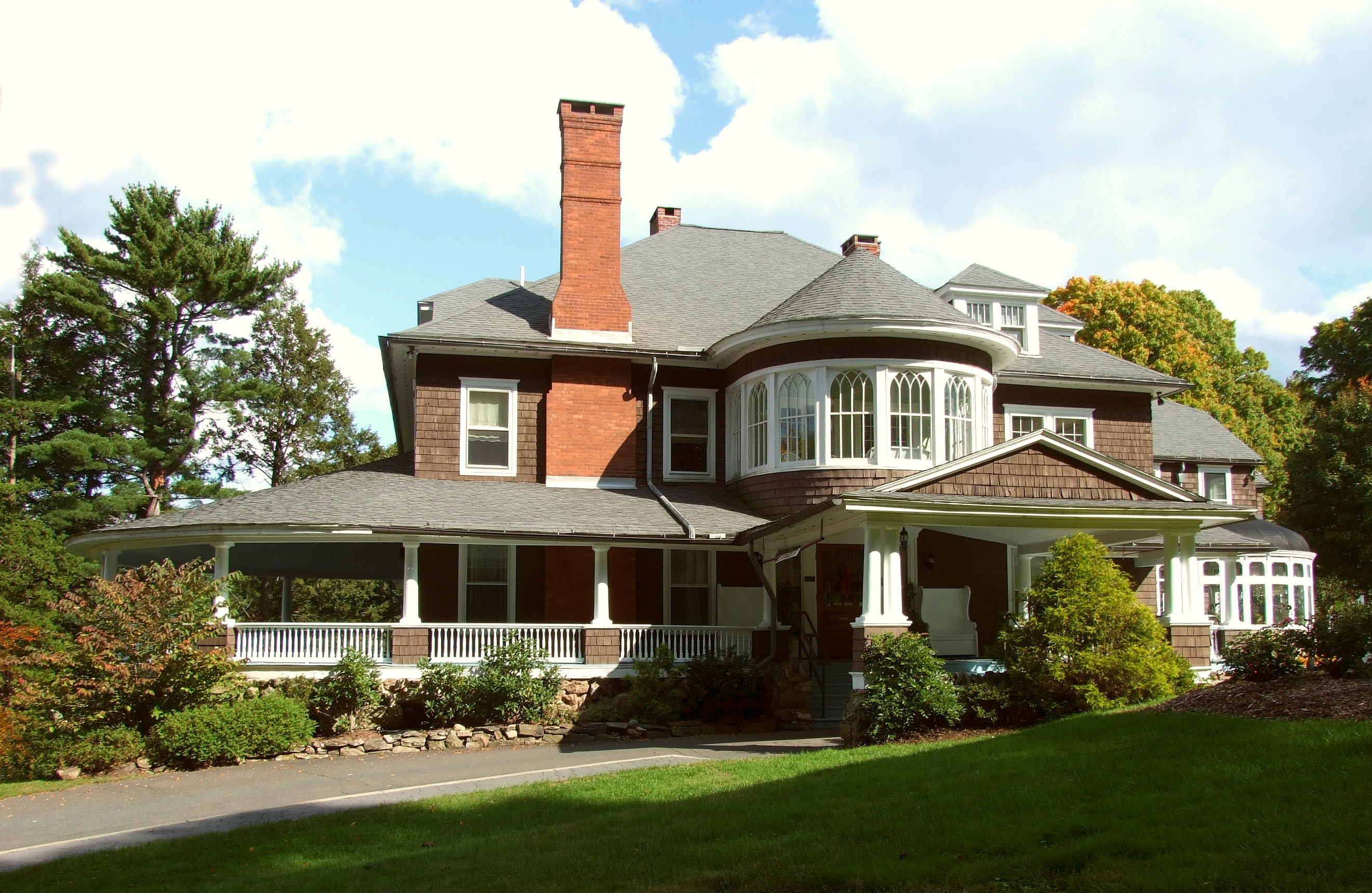
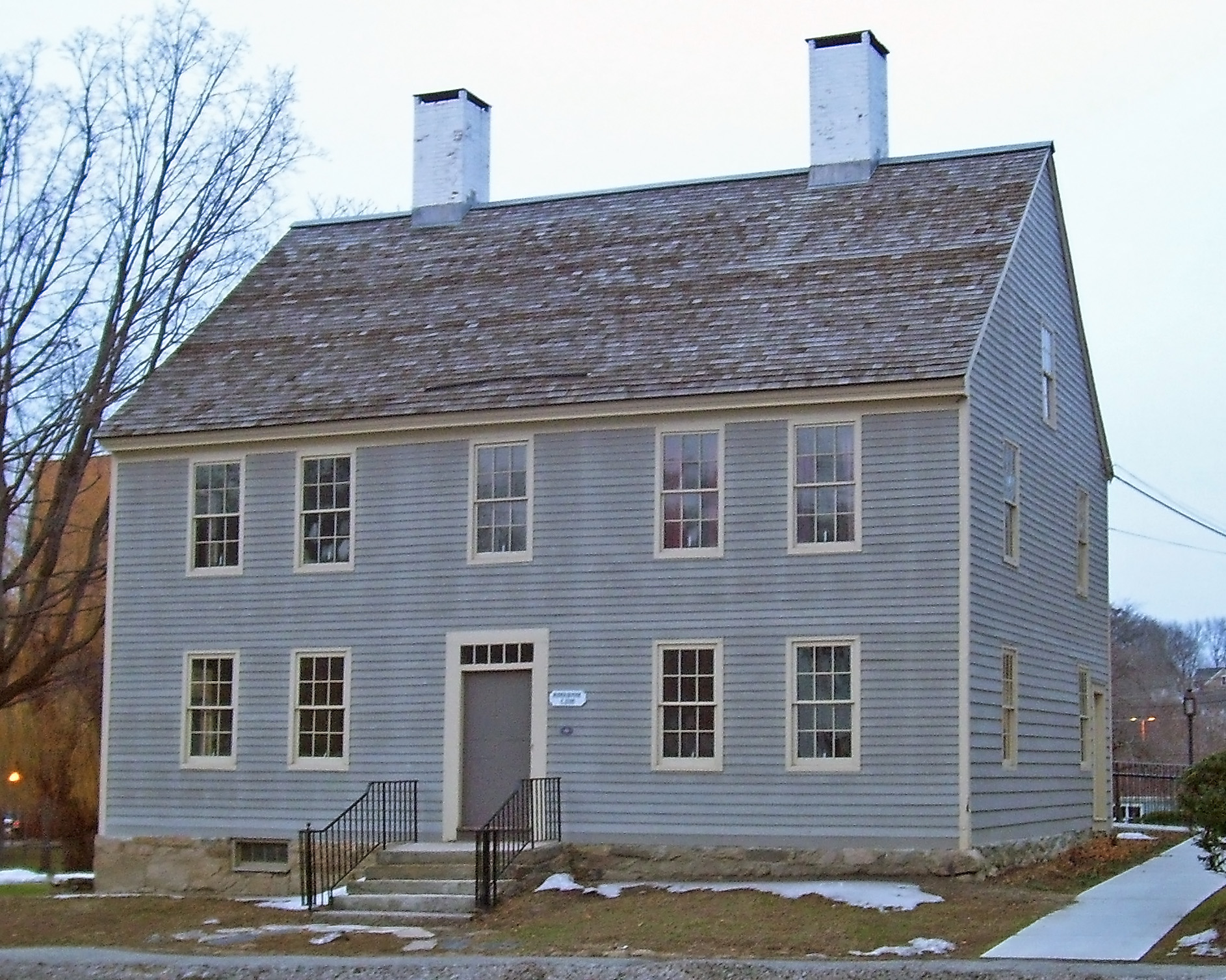
- Downtown Danbury Candlewood Lake Western Connecticut State University Tarrywile Mansion John Rider House

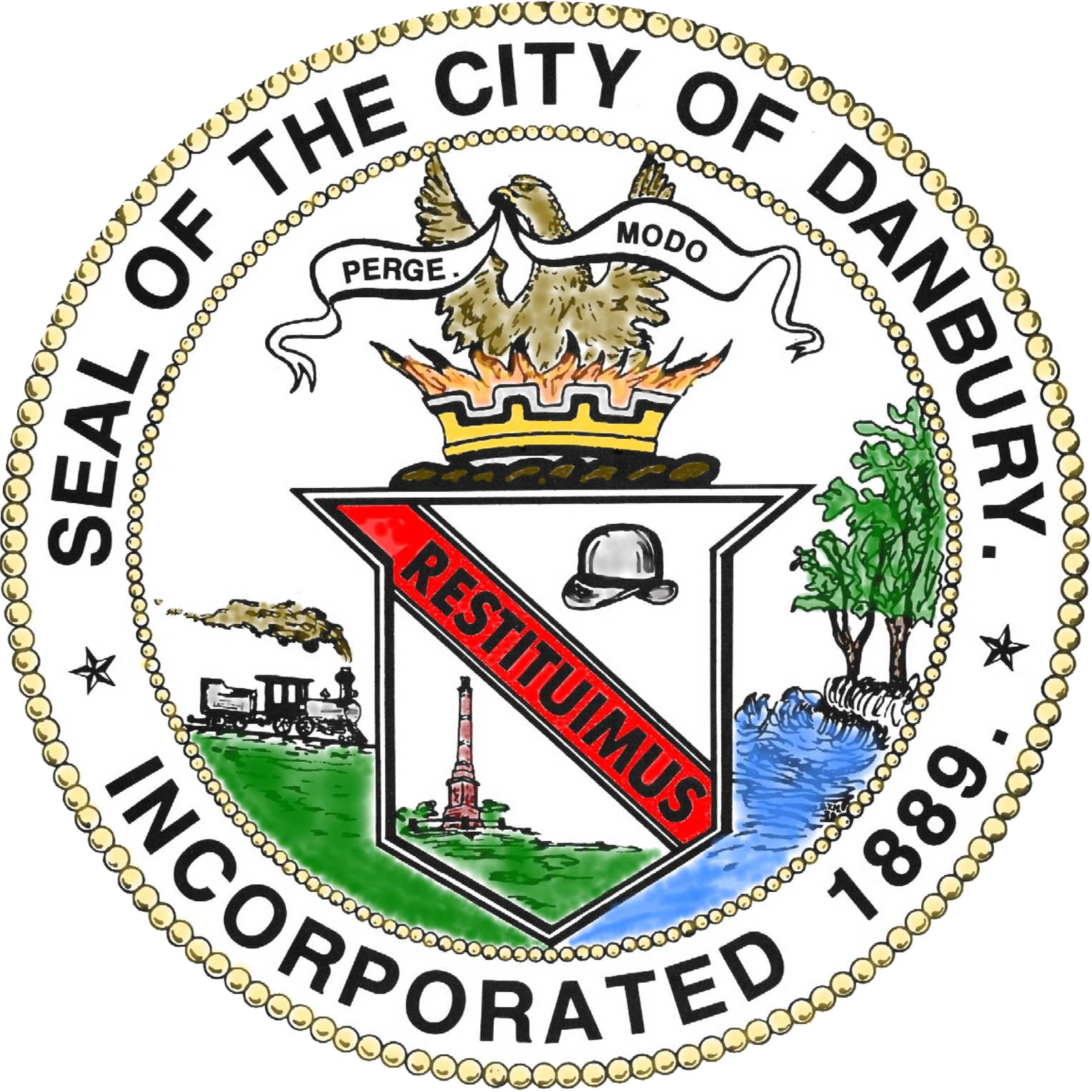
- Flag Seal Wordmark
- Nickname: The Hat City
- Coordinates: 41°24′08″N 73°28′16″W
- Country: United States
- State: Connecticut
- County: Fairfield
- Region: Western CT
- Incorporated (town): 1702
- Incorporated (city): 1889
- Consolidated: 1965
- Named for: Danbury, Essex
- Villages/Neighborhoods: Aqua Vista (Candlewood); Beaverbrook; Beckettville; Germantown; Great Plain; Hayestown; Long Ridge; King Street; Lake Waubeeka; Mill Plain; Miry Brook; Pembroke; Wooster Heights

Government
  - Type: Mayor-council
  - Mayor: Roberto L. Alves (D)

Area
  - City: 44.19 sq mi (114.45 km^{2})
  - Land: 41.95 sq mi (108.64 km^{2})
  - Water: 2.24 sq mi (5.81 km^{2})
  - Urban: 123.6 sq mi (320.1 km^{2})
- Elevation: 397 ft (121 m)

Population (2020)
  - City: 86,518
  - Density: 2,019.1/sq mi (779.56/km^{2})
- Time zone: UTC−5 (Eastern)
  - Summer (DST): UTC−4 (Eastern)
- ZIP Codes: 06810–06811, 06813
- Area codes: 203/475
- FIPS code: 09-18430
- GNIS feature ID: 206580
- Airport: Danbury Municipal Airport
- Website: www.danbury-ct.gov

Danbury (/ˈdænbɛri/ DAN-berr-ee) is a city in Fairfield County, Connecticut, United States, located approximately 50 miles (80 km) northeast of New York City. Danbury's population as of 2020 was 86,518. It is the third-largest city in Western Connecticut, and the seventh-largest city in Connecticut. The city is part of the Western Connecticut Planning Region. Located within the heart of the Housatonic Valley region, the city is a historic commercial hub of western Connecticut, home to many commuters and summer residents from the New York metropolitan area and New England.

Danbury is nicknamed the "Hat City", because it was once the center of the American hat industry, during the nineteenth and early twentieth centuries. The mineral danburite is named after Danbury, while the city itself is named for Danbury in Essex, England.

Danbury is an economically and culturally diverse city. It is considered the 7th most diverse city in the United States. Up to 35% of its population is foreign-born. Notable populations in Danbury include: Portuguese, Lebanese, Brazilian, Ecuadorian, Indian, German, Polish, Irish, Italian, and Dominican. Danbury Public Schools have students from over 43 countries who speak over 47 languages.

Danbury is home to Danbury Hospital, Western Connecticut State University, Danbury Fair Mall, and Danbury Municipal Airport.

== History ==
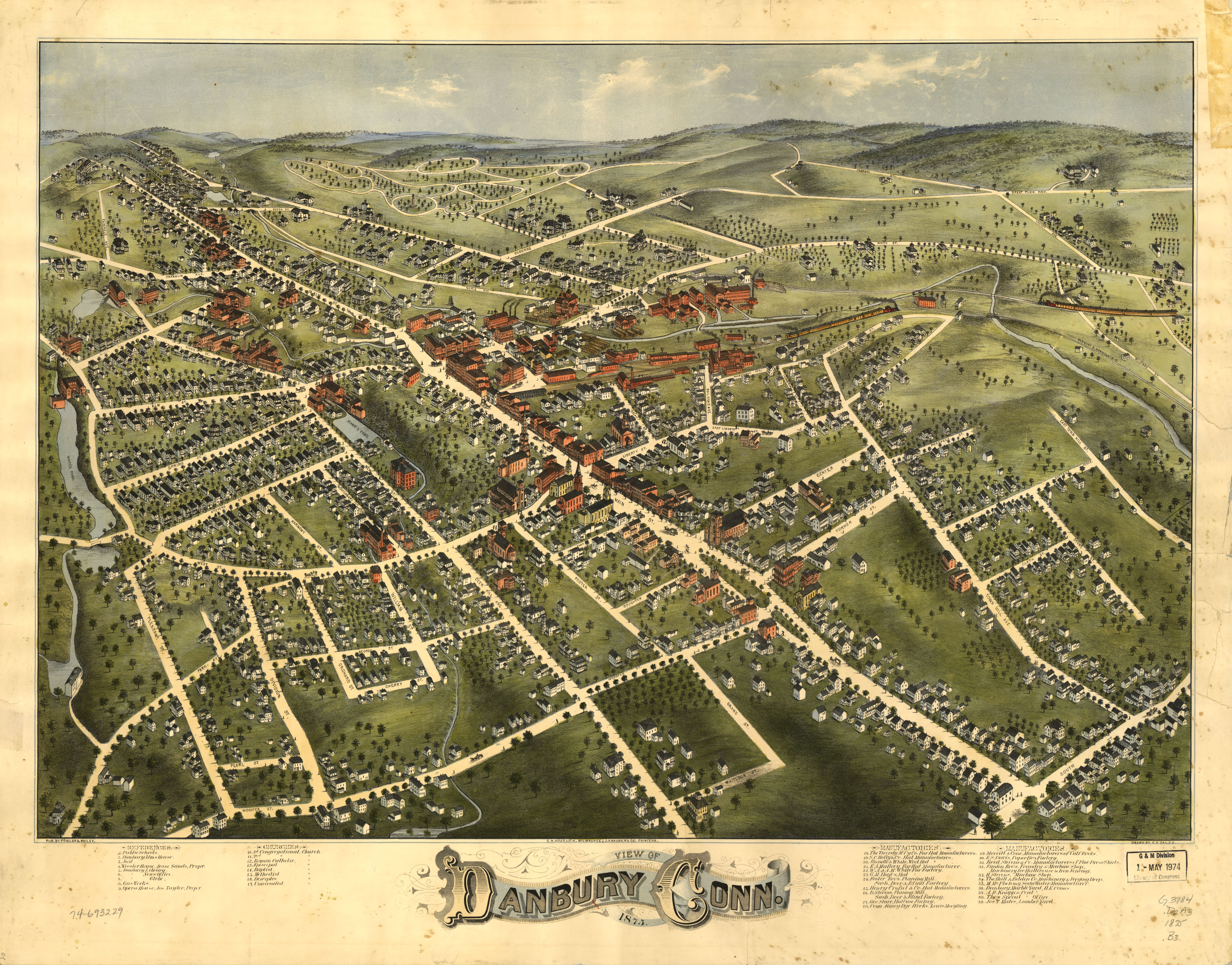
Panoramic map of Danbury with list of sights (1875)

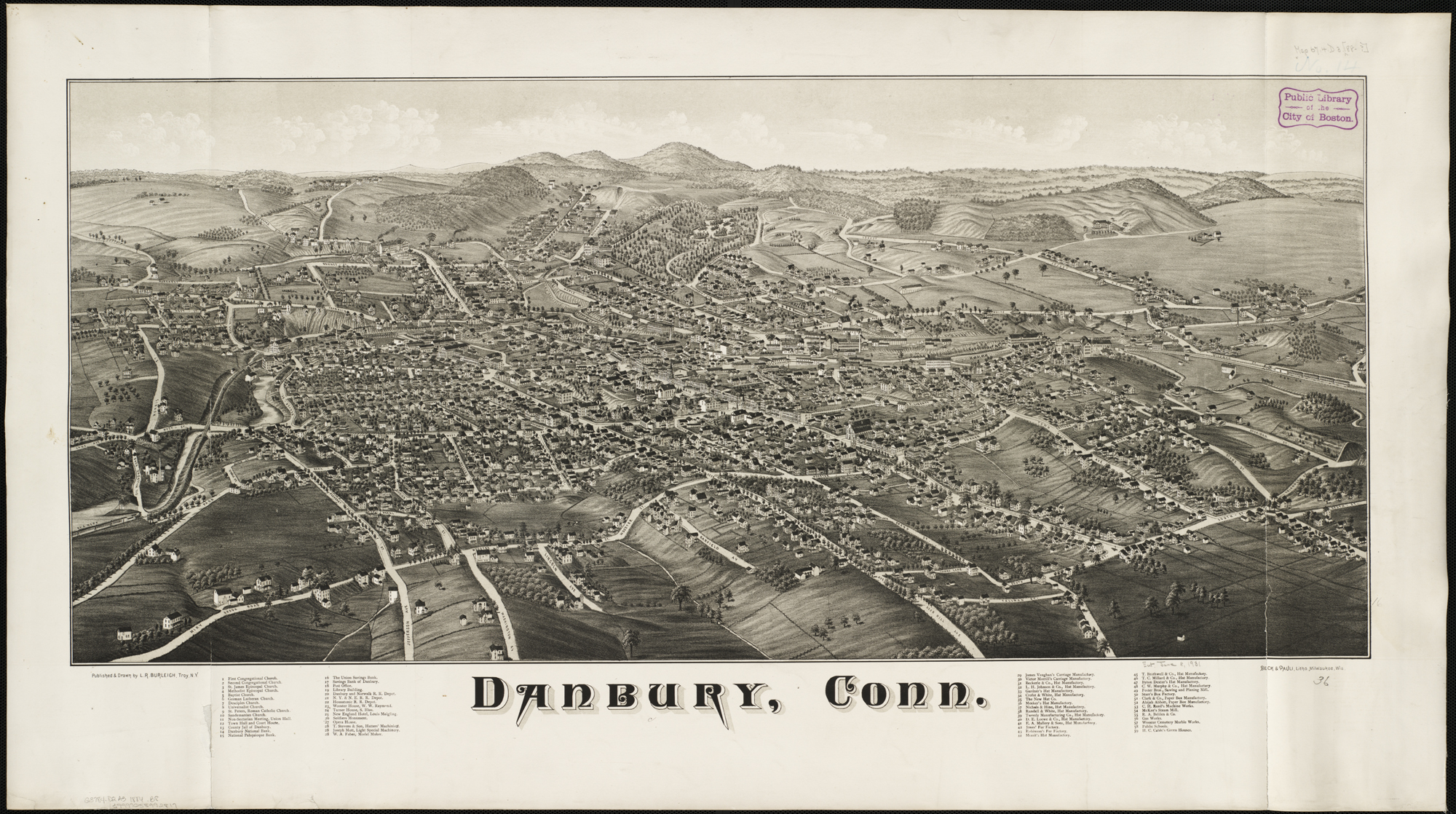
Lithograph of Danbury from a drawing by L. R. Burleigh with list of landmarks

Danbury was settled by colonists in 1685, when eight families moved from what are now Norwalk and Stamford, Connecticut. The Danbury area was then called Pahquioque by its namesake, the Algonquian-speaking Pahquioque Native Americans (they are believed to have been a band of the Paugussett people), who occupied lands along the Still River. Bands were often identified by such geographic designation but they were associated with the larger nation by culture and language).

One of the original settlers in Danbury was Samuel Benedict, who bought land from the Paquioque in 1685, along with his brother James Benedict, James Beebe, and Judah Gregory. This area was also called Paquiack ("open plain" or "cleared land") by the Paquioque. In recognition of the wetlands, the settlers chose the name Swampfield for their town. In October 1687, the general court decreed the name Danbury. The general court appointed a committee to lay out the new town's boundaries. A survey was made in 1693, and a formal town patent was granted in 1702. It was named Danbury by governor Robert Treat after the Danbury parish in Essex.

During the Revolutionary War, Danbury was an important military supply depot for the Continental Army. Sybil Ludington, 16-year-old daughter of American Colonel Henry Ludington, is said to have made a 40-mile ride in the early hours of the night on April 26, 1777, to warn the people of Danbury and her father's forces in Putnam County, New York, of the approach of British regulars, helping them muster in defense; these accounts, originating from the Ludington family, are questioned by modern scholars.

During the following day on April 26, 1777, the British, under Major General William Tryon, burned and sacked Danbury, but fatalities were limited due to Ludington's warning. The central motto on the seal of the City of Danbury is Restituimus, (Latin for "We have restored"), a reference to the destruction caused by the Loyalist army troops. The American General David Wooster was mortally wounded at the Battle of Ridgefield by the British forces which had raided Danbury, but at the beginning of the battle, the Americans succeeded in driving the British forces down to Long Island Sound. Wooster is buried in Danbury's Wooster Cemetery; the private Wooster School in Danbury also was named in his honor.

In 1802, President Thomas Jefferson wrote a letter to the Danbury Baptist Association, a group expressing fear of persecution by the Congregationalists of that town, in which he used the expression "Separation of Church and State". It is the first known instance of the expression in American legal or political writing. The letter is on display at the Unitarian-Universalist Congregation of Danbury.

The first Danbury Fair was held in 1821. In 1869, it became a yearly event; the last edition was in 1981. The fairgrounds were cleared to make room for the Danbury Fair Mall, which opened in autumn 1986.

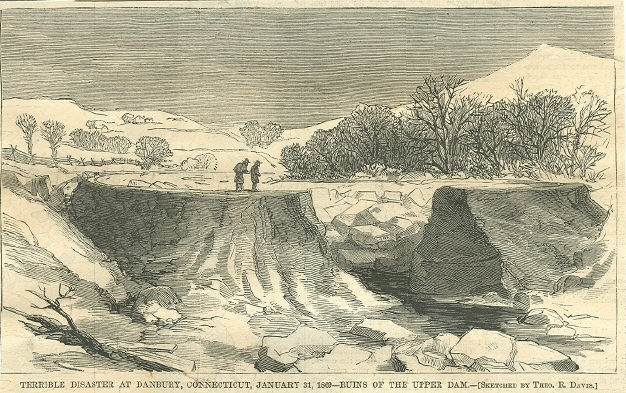
Kohanza Reservoir disaster, January 31, 1869; the dam was breached, releasing a flood on the town.

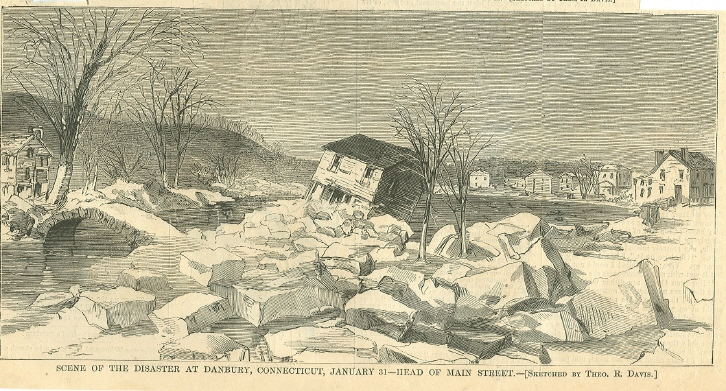
"Scene of the Disaster at Danbury", January 31, 1869

In 1835, the Connecticut Legislature granted a rail charter to the Fairfield County Railroad, but construction was delayed because of lack of investment. In 1850, the organization's plans were scaled back, and renamed the Danbury and Norwalk Railroad. Work moved quickly on the 23 mi (37 km) railroad line. In 1852, the first railroad line in Danbury opened, with two trains making the 75-minute trip to Norwalk.

The central part of Danbury was incorporated as a borough in 1822. The borough was reincorporated as the city of Danbury on April 19, 1889. The city and town were consolidated on January 1, 1965.

The first dam to be built on the river, to collect water for the hat industry, impounded the Kohanza Reservoir. This dam broke on January 31, 1869, under pressure of ice and water. The ensuing flood of icy water killed 11 people within 30 minutes, and caused major damage to homes and farms.

As a busy city, Danbury attracted traveling shows and tours, including Buffalo Bill's Wild West Show in 1900. It featured young men of the Oglala Sioux nation, who re-enacted events from frontier history. Oglala Sioux Albert Afraid of Hawk died on June 29, 1900, at age 21 in Danbury during the tour. He was buried at Wooster Cemetery. In 2012, employee Robert Young discovered Afraid of Hawk's remains. The city consulted with Oglala Sioux leaders of the Pine Ridge Indian Reservation and arranged repatriation of the remains to the nation. This meeting occurred in the Health Sciences Library of Danbury Hospital with assistance of the Chaplain. Wrapped in a bison skin, the remains were transported to Manderson, South Dakota, to Saint Mark's Episcopal Cemetery, for reburial by tribal descendants.

In 1928 local plane pilots bought a 60-acre (24 ha) tract near the Fairgrounds, known as Tucker's Field, and leased it to the town. This was developed as an airport, which is now Danbury Municipal Airport (ICAO: KDXR).

Connecticut's largest lake, Candlewood Lake (of which the extreme southern part is in Danbury), was created as a hydroelectric power facility in 1928 by building a dam where Wood Creek and the Rocky River meet near the Housatonic River in New Milford.

During World War II, Danbury's federal prison was one of many sites used for the incarceration of conscientious objectors. One in six inmates in the United States' federal prisons was a conscientious objector, and prisons like Danbury found themselves suddenly filled with large numbers of highly educated men skilled in social activism. Due to the activism of inmates within the prison, and local laborers protesting in solidarity with the conscientious objectors, Danbury became one of the nation's first prisons to desegregate its inmates.

On August 18–19, 1955, the Still River, which normally meandered slowly through downtown Danbury, overflowed its banks when Hurricane Diane hit the area, dropping six inches of rain on the city. This was in addition to the nine inches that fell from Hurricane Connie five days earlier. The water flooded stores, factories and homes along the river from North Street to Beaver Brook, causing $3 million in damages. Stores downtown on White Street between Main and Maple were especially hard hit. On October 13–16, another 12 inches of rain fell on Danbury, causing the worst flooding in the city's history. This time, the river damaged all bridges across it, effectively cutting the city in half for several days. Flooding was more widespread than in August, and the same downtown areas hit in August were devastated once again. The resulting damage was valued at $6 million, and two people lost their lives. The City determined the river in the downtown area had to be tamed. $4.5 million in federal and state funding were acquired as part of a greater urban renewal project to straighten, deepen, widen, and enclose the river in a concrete channel through the downtown. At the same time, roads were relocated and rebuilt, 123 major buildings were razed and 104 families were relocated. This began various efforts by the City through 1975 towards urban renewal, using another $22 million of federal funding. However, these efforts failed to reinvigorate the central business district.

On February 13, 1970, brothers James and John Pardue detonated time bombs (injuring 26 people) at the police station, Union Savings Bank and in their getaway car to cover their escape from robbing the bank at gunpoint, the culmination of a two-year crime spree that included four bank robberies and five murders.

The flawed primary mirror of the Hubble Space Telescope was ground and polished in Danbury by Perkin-Elmer's Danbury Optical System unit from 1979 to 1981. It was mistakenly ground to the wrong shape due to the use of a miscalibrated testing device. The mistake was not discovered until after the telescope was in orbit and began to be used. The effects of the flaw were corrected during the telescope's first servicing mission in 1993.

In the August 1988 issue of Money magazine, Danbury topped the magazine's list of the best U.S. cities to live in, mostly due to low crime, good schools, and location.

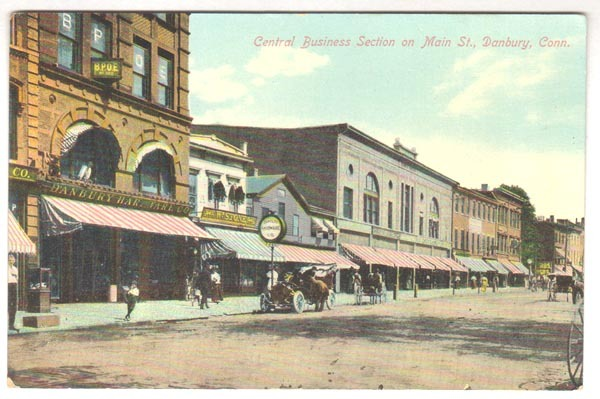
Downtown Main Street scene, c. 1907

A case that would make national headlines and play out for over four years began on September 19, 2006, when eleven day laborers, who came to be known as the "Danbury 11", were arrested in Danbury. A sting operation had been set up where day laborers were lured into a van whose driver, a disguised Danbury police officer posing as a contractor, promised them work. The laborers were driven to a parking lot where, if it was determined they were in the US illegally, were arrested by agents of ICE and the Danbury police. Yale University law students represented the men pro bono and filed a civil rights lawsuit against the city on their behalf. On March 8, 2011, it was confirmed a settlement had been reached in the case whereby Danbury agreed to pay the laborers $400,000 (Danbury's insurance carrier paid the settlement plus legal fees of close to $1,000,000, less a $100,000 deductible). The federal government agreed to pay them $250,000. As part of the settlement, the City did not admit any wrongdoing and there were no changes in the city's policies or procedures.

=== Hatmaking in Danbury ===
In 1780, what is traditionally considered to be the first hat shop in Danbury was established by Zadoc Benedict. (Hatmaking had existed in Danbury before the Revolution.) The Benedict shop had three employees, and they made 18 hats weekly. By 1800, Danbury was producing 20,000 hats annually, more than any other city in the U.S. Due to the fur felt hat coming back into style for men and increasing mechanization in the 1850s, by 1859 hat production in Danbury had risen to 1.5 million annually. By 1887, thirty factories were producing 5 million hats per year. Around this time, fur processing was separated from hat manufacturing when the P. Robinson Fur Cutting Company (1884) on Oil Mill Road and the White Brothers' factory began operation.

By 1880, workers had unionized, beginning decades of labor unrest. They struggled to achieve conditions that were more fair, going on strike; with management reacting with lockouts. Because of the scale of the industry, labor unrest and struggles over wages affected the economy of the entire town. In 1893, nineteen manufacturers locked out 4000 union hatters. In 1902, the American Federation of Labor union called for a nationwide boycott of Dietrich Loewe, a Danbury non-union hat manufacturer. The manufacturer sued the union under the Sherman Antitrust Act for unlawfully restraining trade. In the 1908 Danbury Hatters' Case the U.S. Supreme Court ruled that the union was liable for damages. In the 1930s and 1940s, there were a number of violent incidents during several strikes, mostly involving scab workers brought in as strikebreakers.

Beginning in 1892, the industry was revolutionized when the large hat factories began to shift to manufacturing unfinished hat bodies only, and supplying them to smaller hat shops for finishing. While Danbury produced 24% of America's hats in 1904, the city supplied the industry with 75% of its hat bodies. The turn of the century was the heyday of the hatting industry in Danbury, when it became known as the "Hat City" and the "Hatting Capitol of the World". Its motto was "Danbury Crowns Them All".

==== Mercury poisoning ====
The use of mercuric nitrate in the felting process poisoned many workers in the hat factories, creating a condition called erethism, also called "mad hatter disease." The condition, known locally as the "Danbury shakes", was characterized by slurred speech, tremors, stumbling, and, in extreme cases, hallucinations. The effect of mercury on the workers' health was first noted in the late 19th century. While workers in the Danbury factories lobbied for controls on mercury in the early 20th century, a government study on the health effects of mercury was not conducted until 1937. The State of Connecticut announced a ban on mercury in hatmaking in 1941.

While Danbury hat factories stopped using mercury in the 1940s, the mercury waste has remained in the Still River and adjacent soils, and has been detected at high levels in the 21st century.

==== Industry decline ====
By the 1920s, the hat industry was in decline. By 1923, only six manufacturers were left in Danbury, which increased the pressure on workers. After World War II, returning soldiers went hatless, a trend that accelerated through the 1950s, dooming the city's hat industry. The city's last major hat factory, owned by Stetson, closed in 1964. The last hat was made in Danbury in 1987 when a small factory owned by Stetson closed.

=== Historic pictures ===
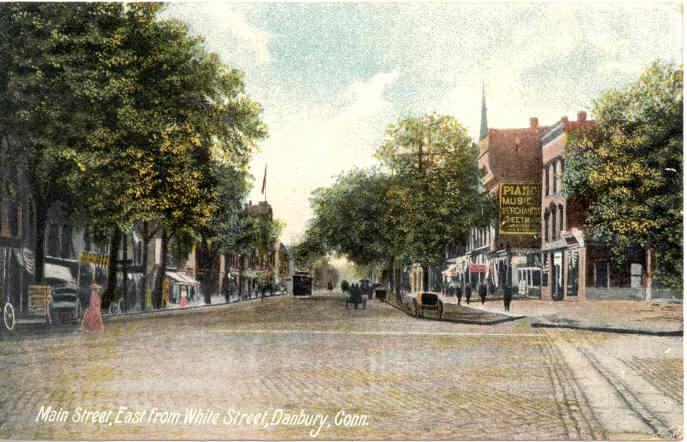
Main Street looking east from White Street, 1907

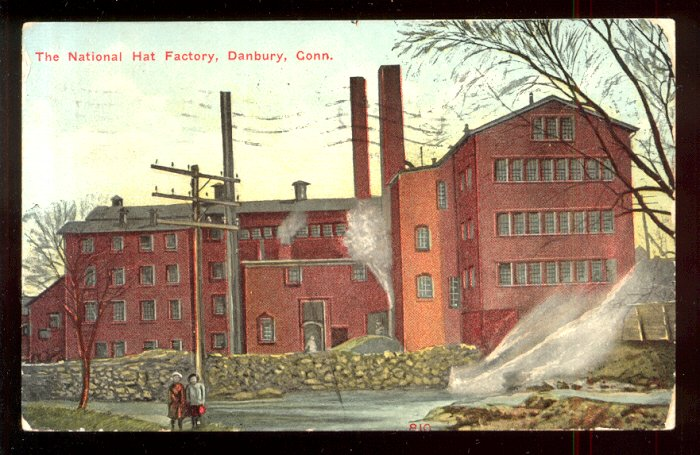
National Hat Factory, about 1912

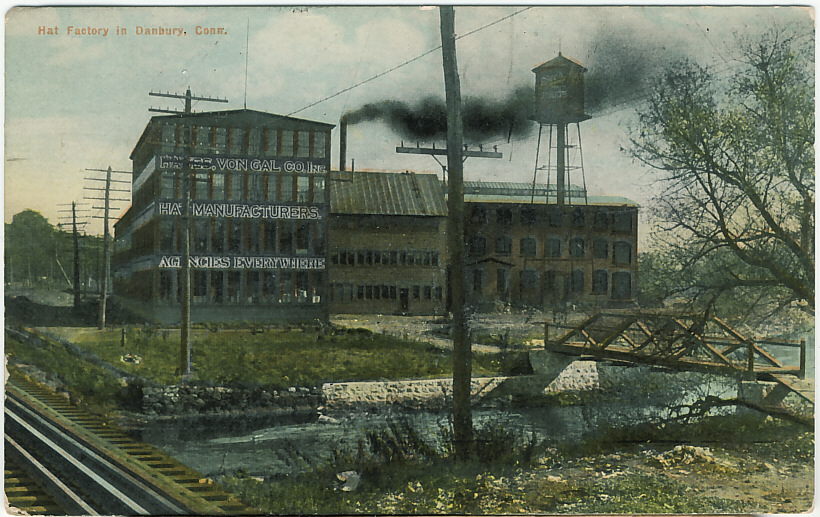
View of a hat factory, 1911

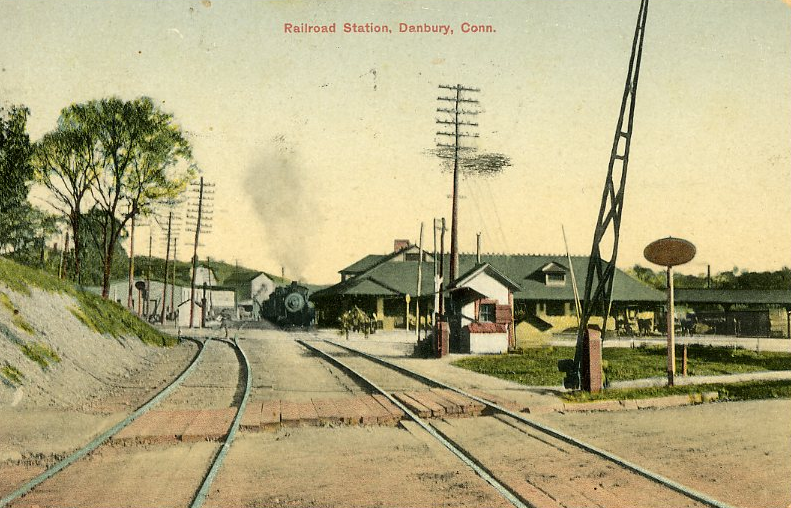
Danbury station, c. 1910

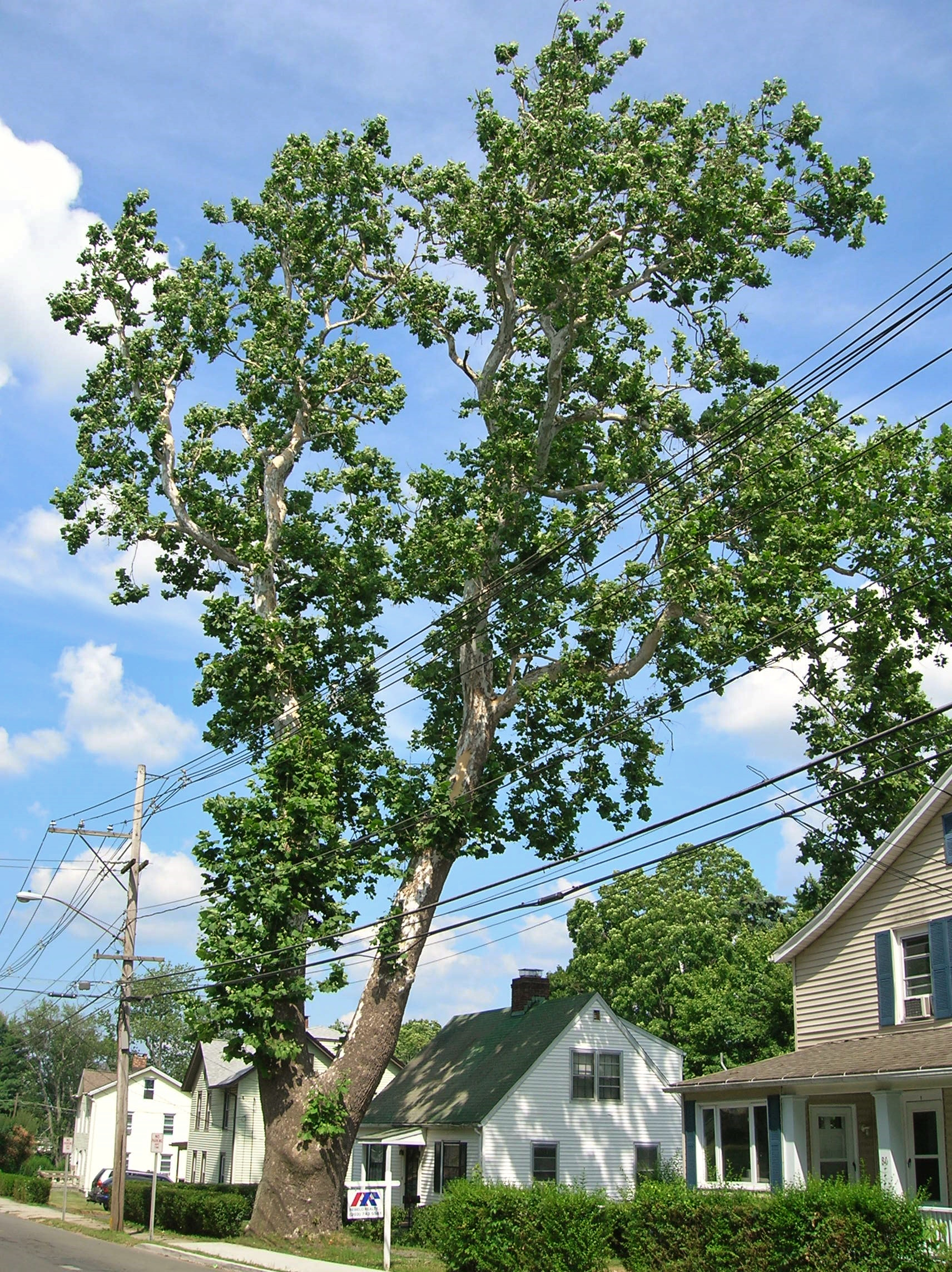
Revolutionary Sycamore

== Geography ==
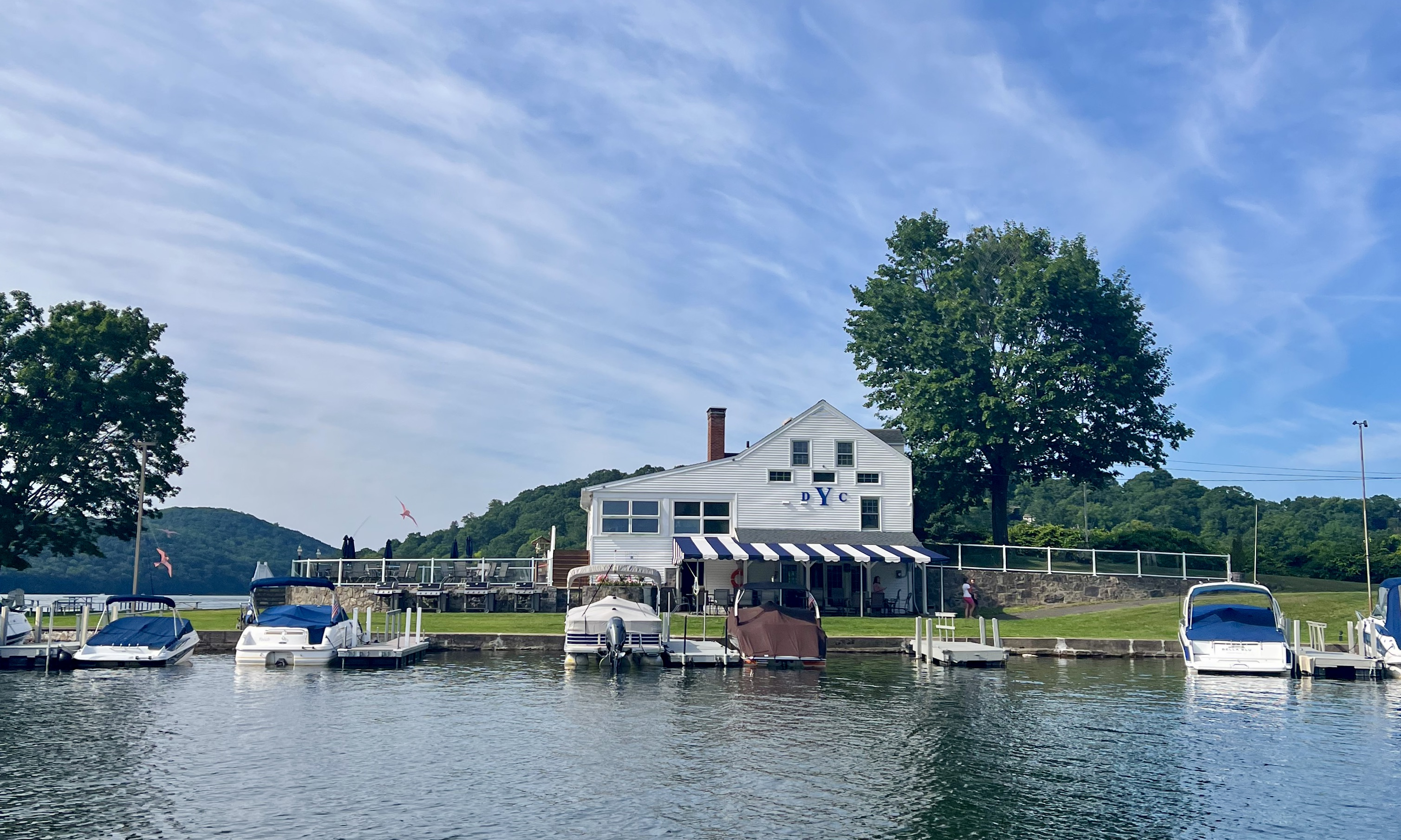
Danbury Yacht Club on Candlewood Lake, the largest lake in Connecticut

According to the United States Census Bureau, Danbury has a total area of 44.3 square miles (115 km^{2}), of which 42.1 square miles (109 km^{2}) is land and 2.2 square miles (5.7 km^{2}), or 4.94%, is water. The city is located in the foothills of the Berkshire Mountains on low-lying land just south of Candlewood Lake (the City includes the southern parts of the lake). It developed along the Still River, which flows generally from west to east through the city before joining the Housatonic River. The city's terrain includes rolling hills and not-very-tall mountains to the west and northwest called the Western Highland. Ground elevations in the city range from 378 feet to 1,050 feet above sea level.

A geologic fault known as Cameron's Line runs through Danbury.

=== Pollution ===
The hatmaking fur-removal process was based on the use of mercury nitrate. The waste caused serious water pollution as the hat manufacturers dumped it into the Still River throughout the late 19th century and into the 1940s. This toxic product flowed into the Housatonic River and Long Island Sound, affecting water quality and various fish and other organisms.

Field studies conducted in the Still River basin in the 21st century have detected the continuing presence of high levels of mercury in the river sediments and nearby soils.

=== Climate ===
Danbury has a humid continental climate (Köppen Dfa), with four distinct seasons, resembling Hartford more than coastal Connecticut or New York City. Summers are hot and humid, while winters are cold with significant snowfall. The monthly daily average temperature ranges from 28.0 °F (−2.2 °C) in January to 74.5 °F (23.6 °C) in July; on average, temperatures reaching 90 or 0 °F (32 or −18 °C) occur on 18 and 3.1 days of the year, respectively. The average annual precipitation is approximately 56.04 inches (1,420 mm), which is distributed fairly evenly throughout the year; snow averages 49.3 inches (125 cm) per season, although this total may vary considerably from year to year. Extremes in temperature range from 106 °F (41 °C) on July 22, 1926, and July 15, 1995 (the highest temperature recorded in Connecticut) down to −18 °F (−28 °C) on February 9, 1934.

Climate data for Danbury, Connecticut (1991–2020 normals, extremes 1937–present)
| Month | Jan | Feb | Mar | Apr | May | Jun | Jul | Aug | Sep | Oct | Nov | Dec | Year |
|---|---|---|---|---|---|---|---|---|---|---|---|---|---|
| Record high °F (°C) | 71 (22) | 78 (26) | 92 (33) | 95 (35) | 97 (36) | 105 (41) | 106 (41) | 104 (40) | 100 (38) | 91 (33) | 82 (28) | 80 (27) | 106 (41) |
| Mean maximum °F (°C) | 57.9 (14.4) | 58.6 (14.8) | 69.1 (20.6) | 83.3 (28.5) | 90.3 (32.4) | 93.7 (34.3) | 96.0 (35.6) | 93.6 (34.2) | 87.7 (30.9) | 79.2 (26.2) | 69.3 (20.7) | 59.2 (15.1) | 97.7 (36.5) |
| Mean daily maximum °F (°C) | 36.1 (2.3) | 39.8 (4.3) | 47.9 (8.8) | 61.0 (16.1) | 71.8 (22.1) | 80.6 (27.0) | 85.5 (29.7) | 82.2 (27.9) | 75.1 (23.9) | 63.2 (17.3) | 51.1 (10.6) | 40.5 (4.7) | 61.2 (16.2) |
| Daily mean °F (°C) | 28.0 (−2.2) | 30.2 (−1.0) | 37.8 (3.2) | 49.7 (9.8) | 60.0 (15.6) | 69.3 (20.7) | 74.4 (23.6) | 72.3 (22.4) | 64.4 (18.0) | 52.7 (11.5) | 41.9 (5.5) | 32.5 (0.3) | 51.1 (10.6) |
| Mean daily minimum °F (°C) | 19.9 (−6.7) | 21.1 (−6.1) | 27.9 (−2.3) | 38.5 (3.6) | 48.2 (9.0) | 58.1 (14.5) | 63.4 (17.4) | 61.8 (16.6) | 54.0 (12.2) | 42.2 (5.7) | 32.7 (0.4) | 24.9 (−3.9) | 41.1 (5.0) |
| Mean minimum °F (°C) | 1.3 (−17.1) | 5.2 (−14.9) | 12.0 (−11.1) | 25.1 (−3.8) | 34.3 (1.3) | 44.4 (6.9) | 52.5 (11.4) | 49.8 (9.9) | 38.7 (3.7) | 28.0 (−2.2) | 18.0 (−7.8) | 8.7 (−12.9) | −1.4 (−18.6) |
| Record low °F (°C) | −18 (−28) | −16 (−27) | −9 (−23) | 14 (−10) | 25 (−4) | 35 (2) | 38 (3) | 37 (3) | 23 (−5) | 16 (−9) | 0 (−18) | −11 (−24) | −18 (−28) |
| Average precipitation inches (mm) | 3.74 (95) | 3.28 (83) | 4.43 (113) | 4.17 (106) | 4.23 (107) | 4.83 (123) | 4.98 (126) | 4.88 (124) | 4.89 (124) | 4.97 (126) | 4.02 (102) | 4.65 (118) | 56.04 (1,423) |
| Average snowfall inches (cm) | 15.7 (40) | 11.0 (28) | 10.4 (26) | 1.7 (4.3) | 0.0 (0.0) | 0.0 (0.0) | 0.0 (0.0) | 0.0 (0.0) | 0.0 (0.0) | 0.0 (0.0) | 1.9 (4.8) | 8.6 (22) | 49.3 (125) |
| Average extreme snow depth inches (cm) | 7 (18) | 9 (23) | 6 (15) | 1 (2.5) | 0 (0) | 0 (0) | 0 (0) | 0 (0) | 0 (0) | 0 (0) | 1 (2.5) | 5 (13) | 12 (30) |
| Average precipitation days (≥ 0.01 in) | 12.0 | 10.8 | 12.3 | 12.1 | 13.1 | 12.0 | 10.7 | 9.6 | 9.6 | 10.2 | 9.9 | 12.0 | 134.3 |
| Average snowy days (≥ 0.1 in) | 8.0 | 6.0 | 4.7 | 1.0 | 0.0 | 0.0 | 0.0 | 0.0 | 0.0 | 0.2 | 1.2 | 5.5 | 26.6 |
Source: NOAA

== Demographics ==
Historical population of Danbury
| Year | Pop. | ±% |
|---|---|---|
| 1756 | 1,527 | — |
| 1790 | 3,031 | +98.5% |
| 1800 | 3,180 | +4.9% |
| 1810 | 3,606 | +13.4% |
| 1820 | 3,873 | +7.4% |
| 1830 | 4,311 | +11.3% |
| 1840 | 4,504 | +4.5% |
| 1850 | 5,964 | +32.4% |
| 1860 | 7,234 | +21.3% |
| 1870 | 8,753 | +21.0% |
| 1880 | 11,666 | +33.3% |
| 1890 | 19,473 | +66.9% |
| 1900 | 19,474 | +0.0% |
| 1910 | 23,502 | +20.7% |
| 1920 | 22,325 | −5.0% |
| 1930 | 26,955 | +20.7% |
| 1940 | 27,921 | +3.6% |
| 1950 | 30,337 | +8.7% |
| 1960 | 39,382 | +29.8% |
| 1970 | 50,781 | +28.9% |
| 1980 | 60,470 | +19.1% |
| 1990 | 65,585 | +8.5% |
| 2000 | 74,848 | +14.1% |
| 2010 | 80,893 | +8.1% |
| 2020 | 86,518 | +7.0% |
| 2024 | 88,692 | +2.5% |
U.S. Decennial Census; Population by Decade 1790–2010; State of Connecticut; 2024 Estimate; Source: U.S. Decennial Census

=== Racial and ethnic composition ===
Danbury, Connecticut – Racial and ethnic composition Note: the US Census treats Hispanic/Latino as an ethnic category. This table excludes Latinos from the racial categories and assigns them to a separate category. Hispanics/Latinos may be of any race.
| Race / Ethnicity (NH = Non-Hispanic) | Pop 2000 | Pop 2010 | Pop 2020 | % 2000 | % 2010 | % 2020 |
|---|---|---|---|---|---|---|
| White alone (NH) | 50,945 | 46,309 | 37,963 | 68.06% | 57.25% | 43.88% |
| Black or African American alone (NH) | 4,743 | 5,030 | 5,630 | 6.34% | 6.22% | 6.51% |
| Native American or Alaska Native alone (NH) | 131 | 106 | 70 | 0.18% | 0.13% | 0.08% |
| Asian alone (NH) | 4,068 | 5,399 | 5,339 | 5.44% | 6.67% | 6.17% |
| Pacific Islander alone (NH) | 13 | 21 | 25 | 0.02% | 0.03% | 0.03% |
| Some Other Race alone (NH) | 1,096 | 1,845 | 2,980 | 1.46% | 2.28% | 3.44% |
| Mixed Race or Multi-Racial (NH) | 2,061 | 1,998 | 5,821 | 2.75% | 2.47% | 6.73% |
| Hispanic or Latino (any race) | 11,791 | 20,185 | 28,690 | 15.75% | 24.95% | 33.16% |
| Total | 74,848 | 80,893 | 86,518 | 100.00% | 100.00% | 100.00% |

=== 2020 census ===
As of the 2020 census, Danbury had a population of 86,518. The median age was 38.6 years. 21.1% of residents were under the age of 18 and 14.4% of residents were 65 years of age or older. For every 100 females there were 98.2 males, and for every 100 females age 18 and over there were 96.6 males age 18 and over.

96.9% of residents lived in urban areas, while 3.1% lived in rural areas.

There were 31,762 households in Danbury, of which 32.4% had children under the age of 18 living in them. Of all households, 46.4% were married-couple households, 18.6% were households with a male householder and no spouse or partner present, and 27.6% were households with a female householder and no spouse or partner present. About 26.1% of all households were made up of individuals and 10.5% had someone living alone who was 65 years of age or older.

There were 33,562 housing units, of which 5.4% were vacant. The homeowner vacancy rate was 1.2% and the rental vacancy rate was 4.8%.

Racial composition as of the 2020 census
| Race | Number | Percent |
|---|---|---|
| White | 41,640 | 48.1% |
| Black or African American | 6,272 | 7.2% |
| American Indian and Alaska Native | 518 | 0.6% |
| Asian | 5,406 | 6.2% |
| Native Hawaiian and Other Pacific Islander | 32 | 0.0% |
| Some other race | 18,696 | 21.6% |
| Two or more races | 13,954 | 16.1% |
| Hispanic or Latino (of any race) | 28,690 | 33.2% |

=== 2010 census ===
As of the 2010 census, there were 80,893 people and 29,046 households in the city, with 2.73 persons per household. 44.1% of the population spoke a language other than English at home. The population density was 1,921.4 people per square mile. There were 31,154 housing units at an average density of 740.0 per square mile. The racial makeup of the city was 68.2% White, 25.0% Hispanic or Latino (of any race), 7.2% African American, 0.40% Native American, 6.8% Asian, less than 0.10% Pacific Islander, 7.6% from other races, and 4.5% from two or more races. 32% of the population was foreign born. Of particular note is a sizeable population of residents of Portuguese and Brazilian heritage. They are served by locally based Portuguese-language print and broadcast media.

6.7% of the population was under the age of 5, and 21.1% was under the age of 18. 11.1% of the population was 65 years of age or older. 50.9% of the population was female.

=== Income and housing costs ===
The per capita income for the city was $31,411. 11.1% of the population was below the poverty line. The median gross monthly rent was $1,269.

In 2015 the median income for a household in the city was approximately $66,676.

=== Voter registration ===
Voter registration and party enrollment as of October 31, 2023
| Party | Active voters | Inactive voters | Total voters | Percentage |
|---|---|---|---|---|
| Unaffiliated | 19,671 | 1,287 | 20,958 | 45.53% |
| Democratic | 14,260 | 787 | 15,047 | 32.69% |
| Republican | 8,760 | 487 | 9,247 | 20.08% |
| Minor parties | 731 | 52 | 783 | 1.7% |
| Total | 43,422 | 2,613 | 46,035 | 100% |

=== ZIP codes ===
When ZIP codes were introduced in 1963, the 06810 code was given to all of Danbury; it was shared with a then-still-rural New Fairfield to its north. In 1984, the 06810 Zip Code was cut back to areas of Danbury south of Interstate 84. A new 06811 ZIP code was created for areas north of Interstate 84. New Fairfield received its own code, 06812.

== Economy ==
In 2016, Danbury's workforce was approximately 79,400 workers. 12,200 (15.4%) of them worked in goods producing industries. 67,200 (84.6%) of them worked in service providing industries which includes: trade, transportation and utilities (17,300), professional and business services (9,400), leisure and hospitality (7,300), government (10,200) and all other (23,000). In November 2016, the unemployment rate for the Danbury Labor Market Area was 3.0%, compared to 3.7% for the State and 4.6% nationally.

The largest employers in the city in 2024 were:

| # | Employer | # of Employees |
|---|---|---|
| 1 | Western CT Health Network-Danbury | 2,685 |
| 2 | Boehringer Ingelheim | 2,500 |
| 3 | Danbury School Systems | 2,400 |
| 4 | Cartus | 1,100 |
| 5 | IQVIA | 1,040 |
| 6 | Western Connecticut State University | 960 |
| 7 | UTC B.F. Goodrich | 585 |
| 8 | City of Danbury | 597 |
| 9 | Linde plc | 500 |
| 10 | Pitney Bowes | 350 |

== Arts and culture ==
=== Libraries ===
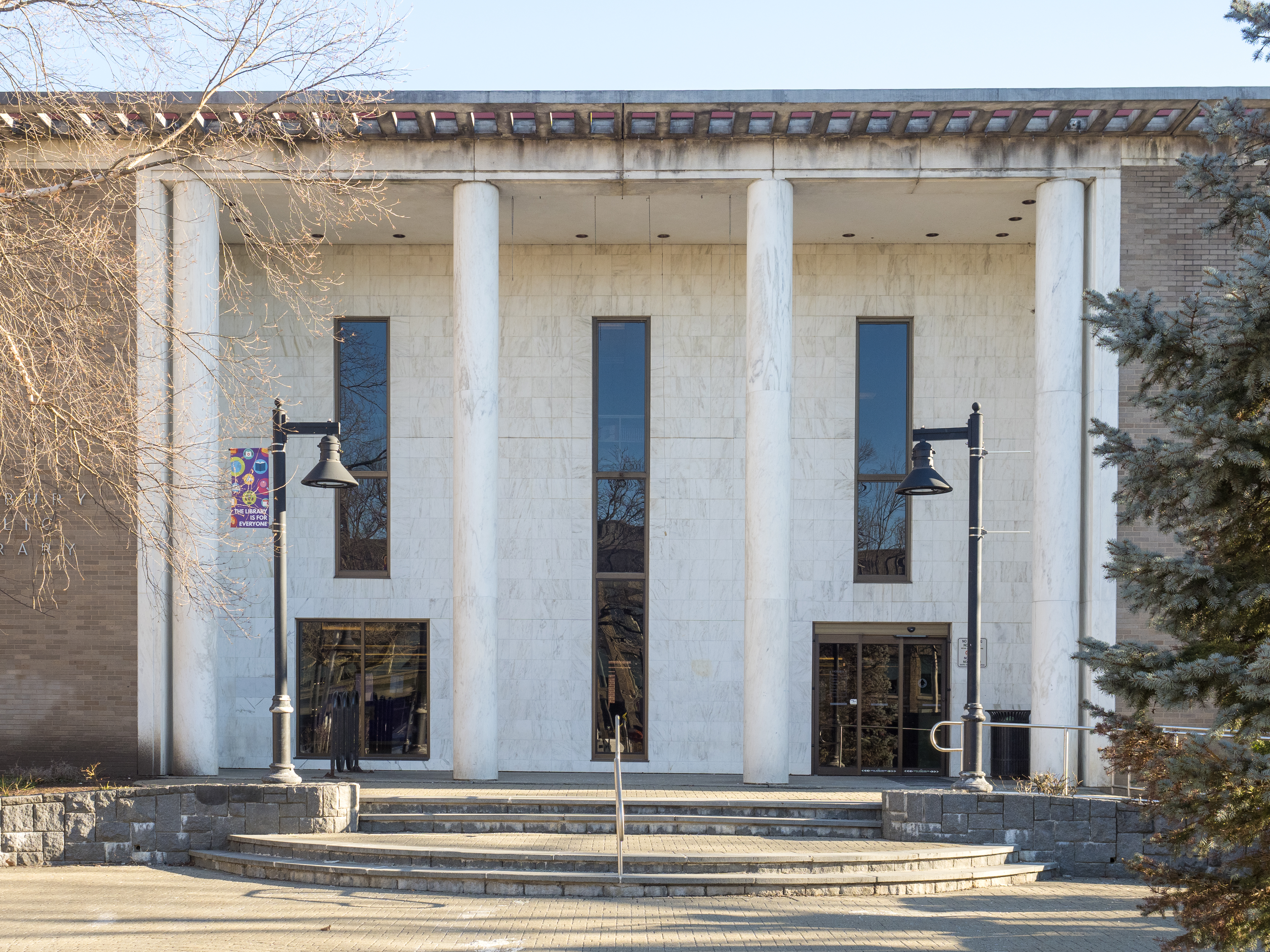
Danbury Public Library (2024)

The Danbury Public Library was established in 1869.

The Long Ridge Library is a small library occupying an old schoolhouse on Long Ridge Road in Danbury. It was founded in 1916.

=== Places of worship ===
Danbury is home to numerous churches, three synagogues, two mosques, and a Hindu temple.

=== Museums ===
- Danbury Museum and Historical Society
- Danbury Railway Museum

=== Other ===
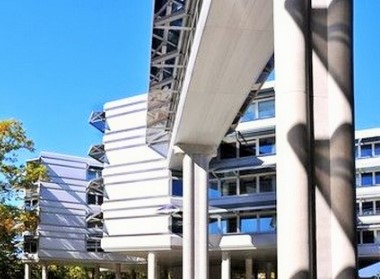
The Summit at Danbury (former headquarters of Union Carbide; now a mixed-use office and apartment complex)

- The Connecticut 9/11 Memorial by sculptor Henry Richardson is located in Danbury in Elmwood Park.
- The Danbury Fair Mall was built on the old fairgrounds in 1986.
- Danbury is also home to an Army Reserve Special Operations unit, the 411th Civil Affairs Battalion.
- Danbury Hospital is a 456-bed hospital, serving patients in Fairfield County, Connecticut and Putnam County, New York. The hospital is the home of the new Praxair Regional Heart and Vascular center, providing state of the art cardiovascular care to this growing region including open heart surgery and coronary angioplasty.
- Richter Park Golf Course is Danbury's municipal golf course and hosts numerous tournaments such as the annual Danbury Amateur and American Junior Golf Association majors. It has won a variety of awards, including being a "Top 10 Connecticut Course" and the "#2 Best Public Course in the NY Metropolitan Area".
- The Summit at Danbury is one of the largest office complexes in Connecticut
- Danbury Ice Arena
- The John Oliver Memorial Sewer Plant

== Sports ==
=== Ice hockey ===
The United Hockey League (UHL) expanded to Danbury in 2004. The Danbury Trashers played their first season at the Danbury Ice Arena in October 2004. Among those on the roster included Brent Gretzky (brother of hockey legend Wayne Gretzky) and Scott Stirling (son of former New York Islanders coach Steve Stirling). Scott's older brother, Todd, coached the Trashers in the 2004–2005 season. The team folded in 2006 after its owner, coach and management were charged (and later convicted) of several charges of wire fraud and racketeering.

On December 27, 2009, Danbury was named the first city to officially have a team in the newly formed Federal Hockey League (FHL). The team was named the Danbury Whalers, bringing back the name "Whalers" to Connecticut for the first time since 1997 when the Hartford Whalers of the WHA/NHL moved to North Carolina and became the Carolina Hurricanes. At the end of the 2014–2015 season, the Danbury Ice Arena evicted the Danbury Whalers. However, a new FHL Danbury team called the Danbury Titans was approved for the 2015–2016 season, owned by local car dealership owner Bruce Bennett. The Titans folded after two seasons.

The Danbury Ice Arena was sold and put under new management in 2019. The arena then added a third FPHL franchise called the Danbury Hat Tricks, a Tier III junior team called the Danbury Colonials, and the relocation of the Premier Hockey Federation's Connecticut Whale. In 2020, the arena added a Tier II junior team called the Danbury Jr. Hat Tricks and the Tier III team also rebranded to the same name.

=== Other sports ===
The Danbury Westerners, a member of the New England Collegiate Baseball League, play their home games at Rogers Park in Danbury.

Danbury-based amateur soccer team Villanovence FC play in the United Premier Soccer League.

The Western Connecticut Militia is a semi-professional football team that played in the New England Football League from 2011 to 2016, winning the league championship the last year. The team played its home games in Danbury during that period. After taking 2017 off, the team joined Major League Football for the 2018 season, playing its home games in New Fairfield, CT.

== Parks and recreation ==
=== Hiking trails ===
- Bear Mountain Reservation
- The Old Quarry Nature Center has two short educational trails on 39 acres (16 ha)
- Tarrywile Mansion and Park has 21 miles (34 km) of trails and several ponds on 722 acres (292 ha), as well as a Victorian mansion and gardens. The Ives Trail runs through the park.
- The Ives Trail is a 20-mile stretch of trail that runs from Bennett's Pond in Ridgefield through Danbury to Redding. The Charles Ives House and Hearthstone Castle are located along this trail.

== Government ==
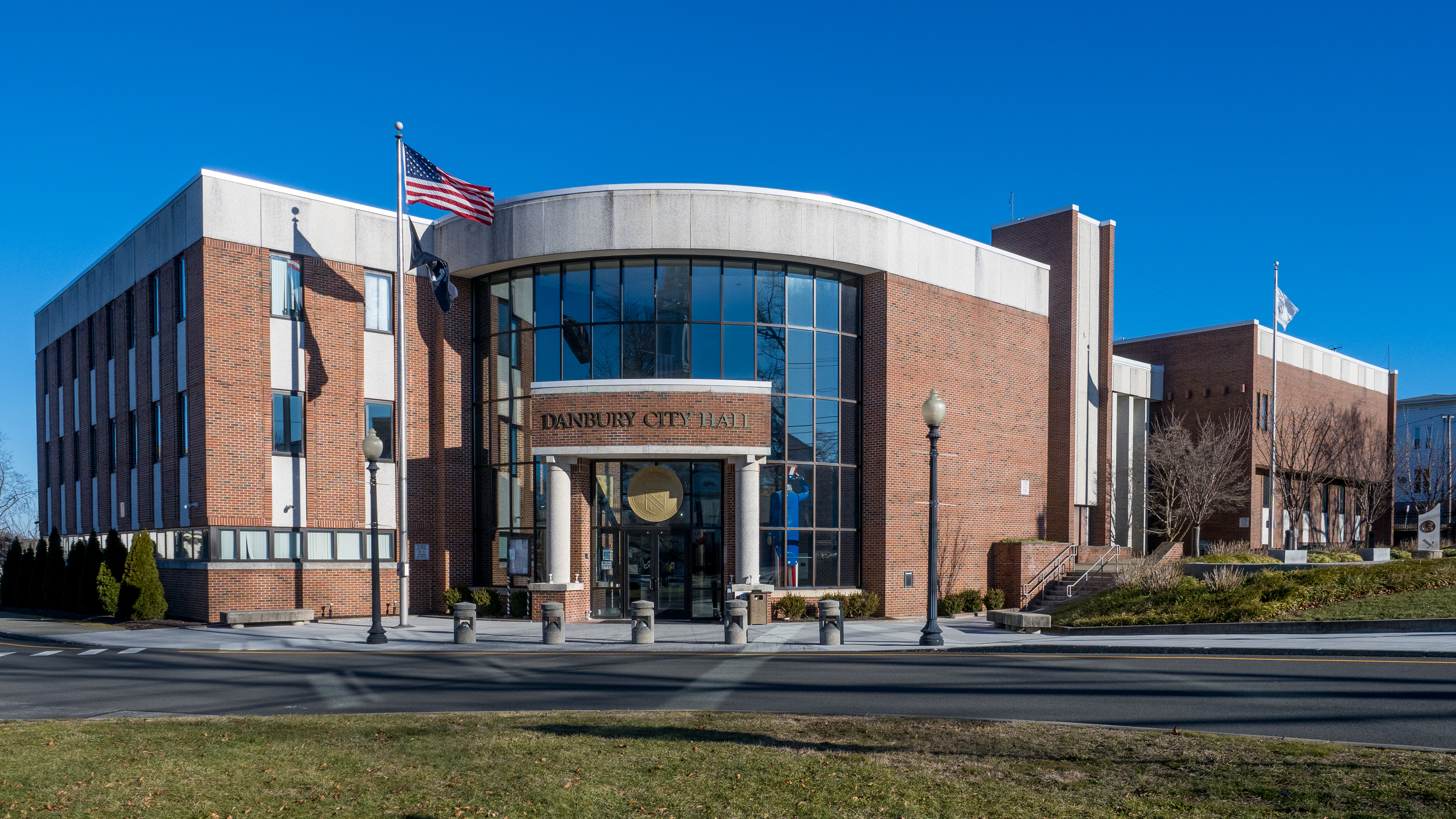
Danbury City Hall (2024)

=== Municipal representation ===
The chief executive officer of Danbury is the Mayor, who serves a two-year term. The current Mayor is Roberto L. Alves (D). Alves, elected in 2023 and sworn in on November 30, 2023, became the first Mayor from the Democratic party since Gene F. Eriquez left office after his term expired in 1999. The Mayor is the presiding officer of the City Council, which consists of 21 members, two from each of the seven city wards, and seven at-large. The City Council enacts ordinances and resolutions by a simple majority vote. If after five days the Mayor does not approve the ordinance (similar to a veto), the City Council may re-vote on it. If it then passes with a two-thirds majority, it becomes effective without the Mayor's approval.

As of September 2026, the City Council consists of 18 Democrats and 3 Republicans.

=== State and federal representation ===
==== Connecticut General Assembly ====
Danbury is represented in the Connecticut General Assembly by six House representatives corresponding to six Connecticut legislative districts and one senator from one Connecticut Senate district.

Connecticut State Senate
| District | Name | Assumed office | Party affiliation |
|---|---|---|---|
| 24 | Julie Kushner | 2019 | Democratic |

Connecticut House of Representatives
| District | Name | Assumed office | Party affiliation |
|---|---|---|---|
| 2 | Raghib Allie-Brennan | 2019 | Democratic |
| 107 | Martin Foncello | 2023 | Republican |
| 108 | Patrick Callahan | 2021 | Republican |
| 109 | Farley Santos | 2023 | Democratic |
| 110 | Bob Godfrey | 1989 | Democratic |
| 138 | Ken Gucker | 2025 | Democratic |

==== United States Congress ====
Danbury lies within Connecticut's 5th congressional district and is represented by Democrat Jahana Hayes in the United States House of Representatives. It is represented by Democrats Richard Blumenthal and Chris Murphy in the United States Senate.

== Education ==
=== Public schools ===
Danbury Public Schools operates most public schools, with Danbury High School belonging to the district. The other public high school, Henry Abbott Technical High School, is within the Connecticut Technical High School System. Each high school is grades 9 through 12. An alternative school by the name of Alternative Center for Excellence is housed off-campus, and its graduates receive Danbury High School diplomas upon completion of their studies. Danbury also has 3 public middle schools for grades 6 through 8: Broadview Middle School, Rogers Park Middle School and Westside Middle School Academy. There are 13 elementary schools in Danbury. These schools are Academy for International Studies Magnet School (K–5), Ellsworth Avenue (K–5), Great Plain (K–5), Hayestown (K–5), King Street Primary (K–3) and King Street Intermediate (4–5), Mill Ridge Primary (K–3), Morris Street (K–5), Park Avenue (K–5), Pembroke (K–5), Shelter Rock (K–5), South Street (K–5) and Stadley Rough (K–5).

=== Parochial schools ===
Roman Catholic schools in Danbury reside within the administration of the Diocese of Bridgeport and include:

- 1 high school: Immaculate High School (9–12)
- 3 elementary schools: St Peter-Sacred Heart School (Pre-K–8), St. Gregory the Great School (Pre-K–8), and St. Joseph School (Pre-K–8)

Other parochial schools in Danbury are:

- Colonial Hills Christian Academy
- Immanuel Lutheran School

=== Private schools ===
- Hudson Country Montessori School
- New England Country Day School
- Wooster School

=== Post-secondary schools ===
Danbury is home to Western Connecticut State University and a campus of Naugatuck Valley Community College.

== Media ==
Danbury is in the New York City TV market and receives its TV stations. Some TV stations in the Hartford-New Haven are also available to Danbury viewers.

- The News-Times – a daily newspaper owned by Hearst Communications.
- Tribuna Newspaper – a biweekly, bilingual (Portuguese/English) news publication.
- HamletHub Danbury – a local news publication.
- WFAR-FM, 93.3 MHz, low-power – religious (Christian) and ethnic/Portuguese-language programming.
- WLAD-AM, 800 kHz, 1000 watts (daytime), 287 watts (nighttime) – news/talk format, owned by the Berkshire Broadcasting Corporation.
- WDAQ-FM 98.3 MHz, 1300 watts – hot adult contemporary format, owned by the Berkshire Broadcasting Corporation.
- WDAQ-HD2 FM, 103.7 MHz – alternative rock format, owned by the Berkshire Broadcasting Corporation.
- WDAQ-HD3 FM, 107.3 MHz – new country music, owned by the Berkshire Broadcasting Corporation.
- WDAQ-HD4 FM, 94.5 MHz – "The Hawk" – classic rock format, owned by the Berkshire Broadcasting Corporation.
- WAXB, 850 kHz AM / 94.5 MHz FM, 2500 watts (daytime only) – Spanish-language adult hits, owned by the Berkshire Broadcasting Corporation.
- WXCI-FM, 91.7 MHz, 3000 watts – non-profit, college radio station, owned by Western Connecticut State University and operated by past and present students
- WRKI-FM, 95.1 MHz, 50000 watts – classic rock music, owned by Townsquare Media; debuted on December 24, 1976.
- WDBY-FM, 105.5 MHz ("The Wolf") – contemporary country music, owned by Townsquare Media.
- WINE-AM, 940 kHz – Portuguese, owned by International Church of the Grace of God, Inc.

== Infrastructure ==
=== Transportation ===
==== Highways ====
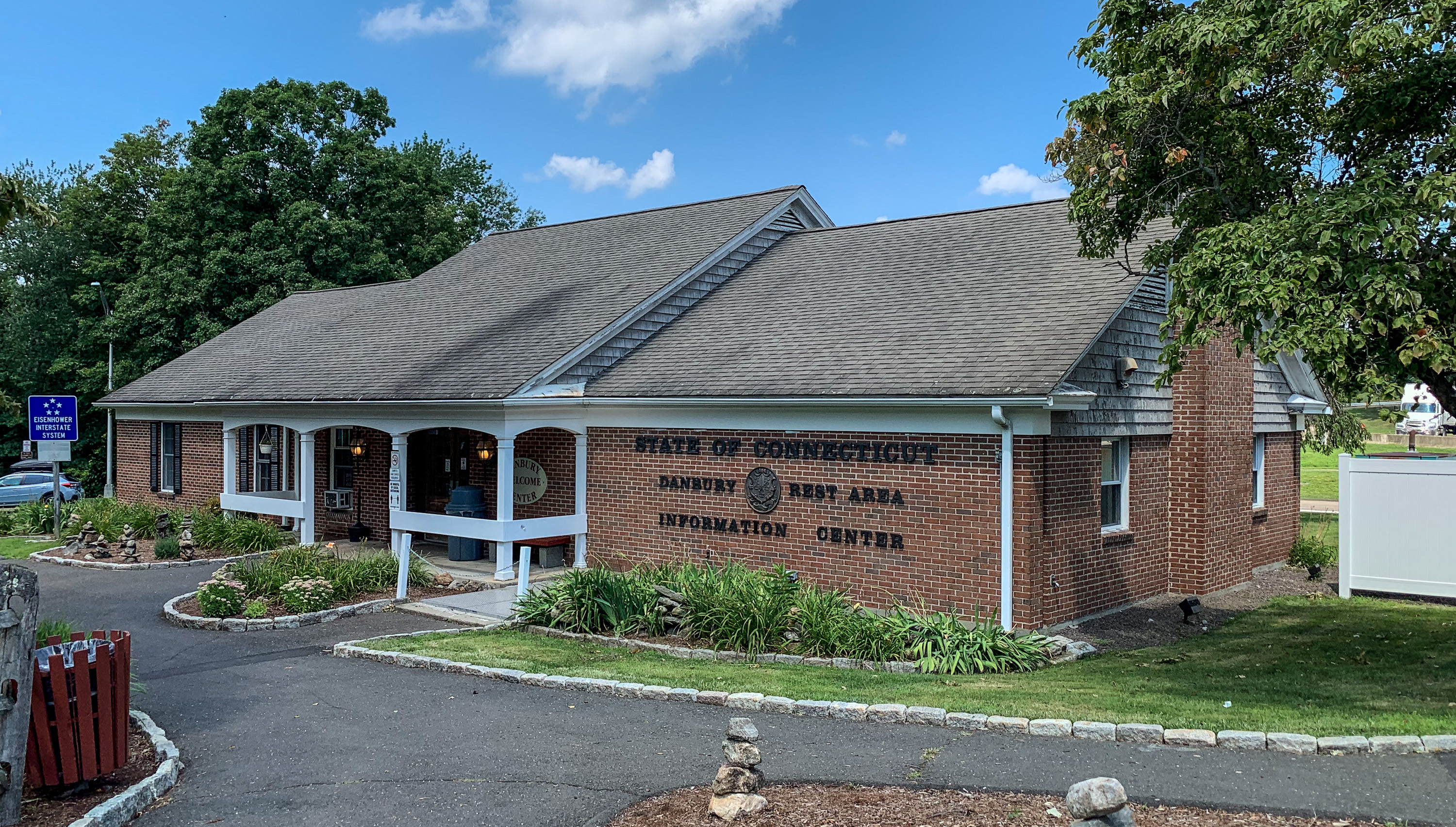
Danbury Rest Area and Information Center on Interstate 84 (eastbound)

Interstate 84 and U.S. Route 7 are the main highways in the city. I-84 runs west to east from the lower Hudson Valley region of New York to Waterbury and Hartford. US 7 runs south to north from Norwalk (connecting to I-95) to the Litchfield Hills region. The two highways overlap in the downtown area. The principal surface roads through the city are Lake Avenue, West Street, White Street, and Federal Road. Other secondary state highways are U.S. Route 6 in the western part of the city, Newtown Road, which connects to US 6 east of the city, Route 53 (Main Street and South Street), Route 37 (North Street, Padaranam Road, and Pembroke Road), and Route 39 (Clapboard Ridge Road and Ball Pond Road). Danbury has 242 miles of streets.

==== Buses ====
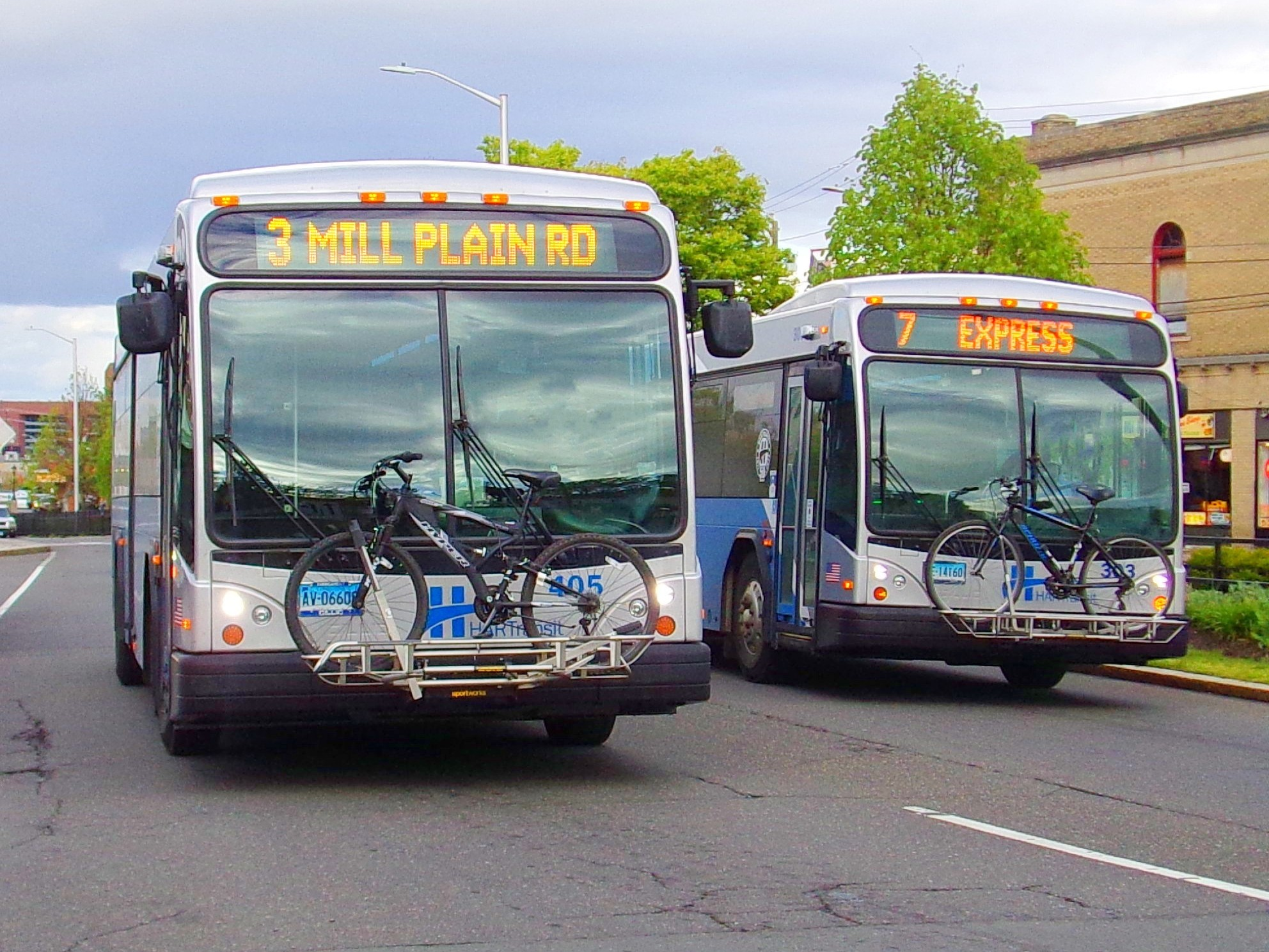
HARTransit buses in Downtown Danbury

Housatonic Area Regional Transit connects Greater Danbury as well as various train stations along the Harlem Line in Putnam County and Westchester County. A shuttle also operates between Downtown Danbury and Norwalk.

==== Railroad ====
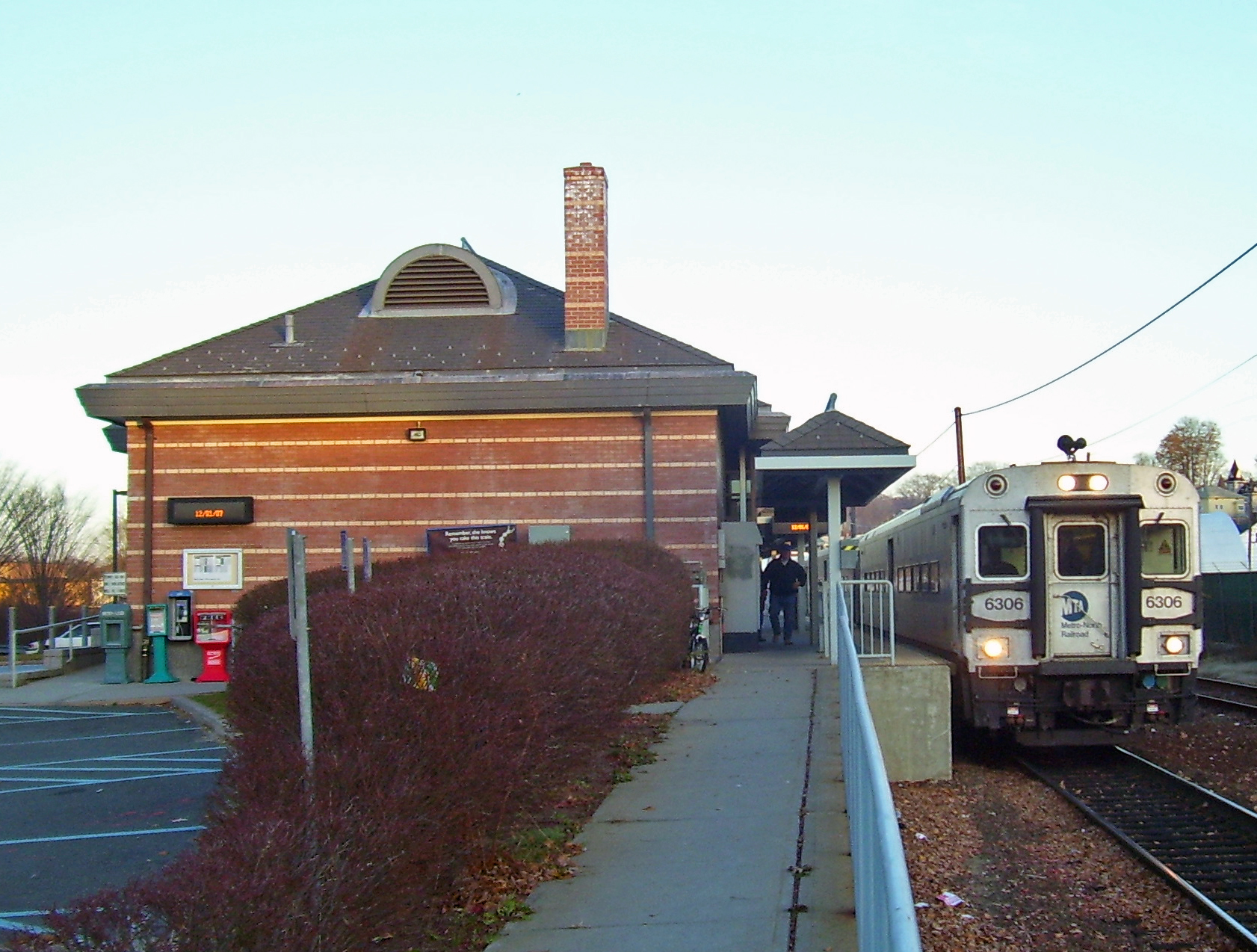
Danbury Metro-North Railroad station, located on the Danbury Branch line

Danbury is the terminus of the Danbury branch line of the MTA Metro-North Railroad which begins in Norwalk. The Danbury Branch provides commuter rail service from Danbury, to South Norwalk, Stamford, and Grand Central Terminal in New York City. The line was first built by the Danbury and Norwalk Railroad which was later bought by the New York, New Haven & Hartford Railroad. Danbury was an important junction between the Danbury Branch and the Maybrook Line. The Maybrook line was the New Haven's main freight line which terminated in Maybrook, New York, where the New Haven exchanged traffic with other railroads. After Penn Central took over the New Haven, the Maybrook line was shut down when a fire on the Poughkeepsie Bridge made the line unusable. The historic station is part of the Danbury Railway Museum. The Providence and Worcester Railroad, along with the Housatonic Railroad provide local rail freight service in Danbury.

==== Airports ====
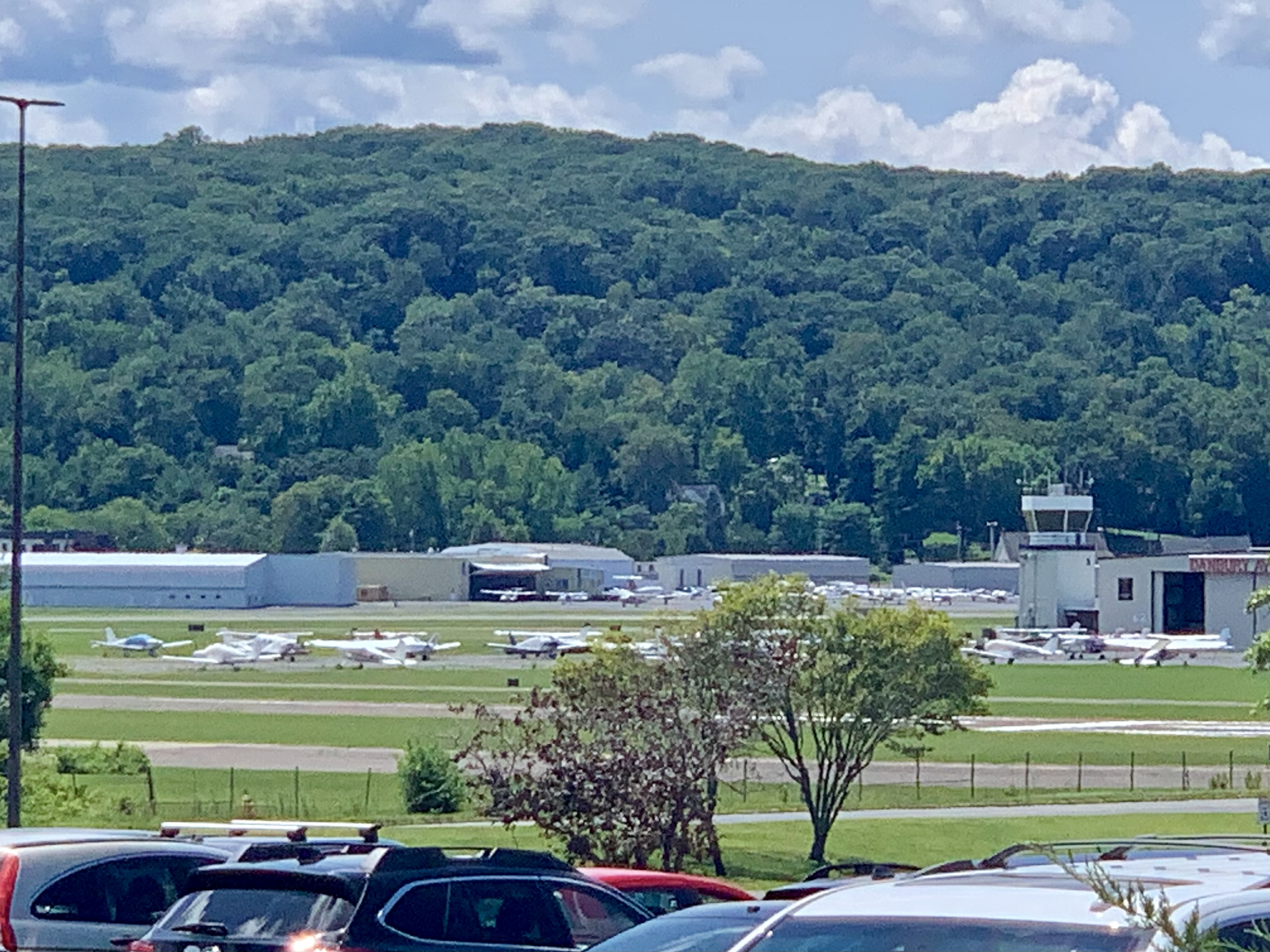
Danbury Municipal Airport, as seen from the Danbury Fair Mall parking lot

Danbury Municipal Airport is a regional airport owned by the City of Danbury. The airport is located in the southwest corner of the city, near the Danbury Fair Mall.

=== Public utilities ===
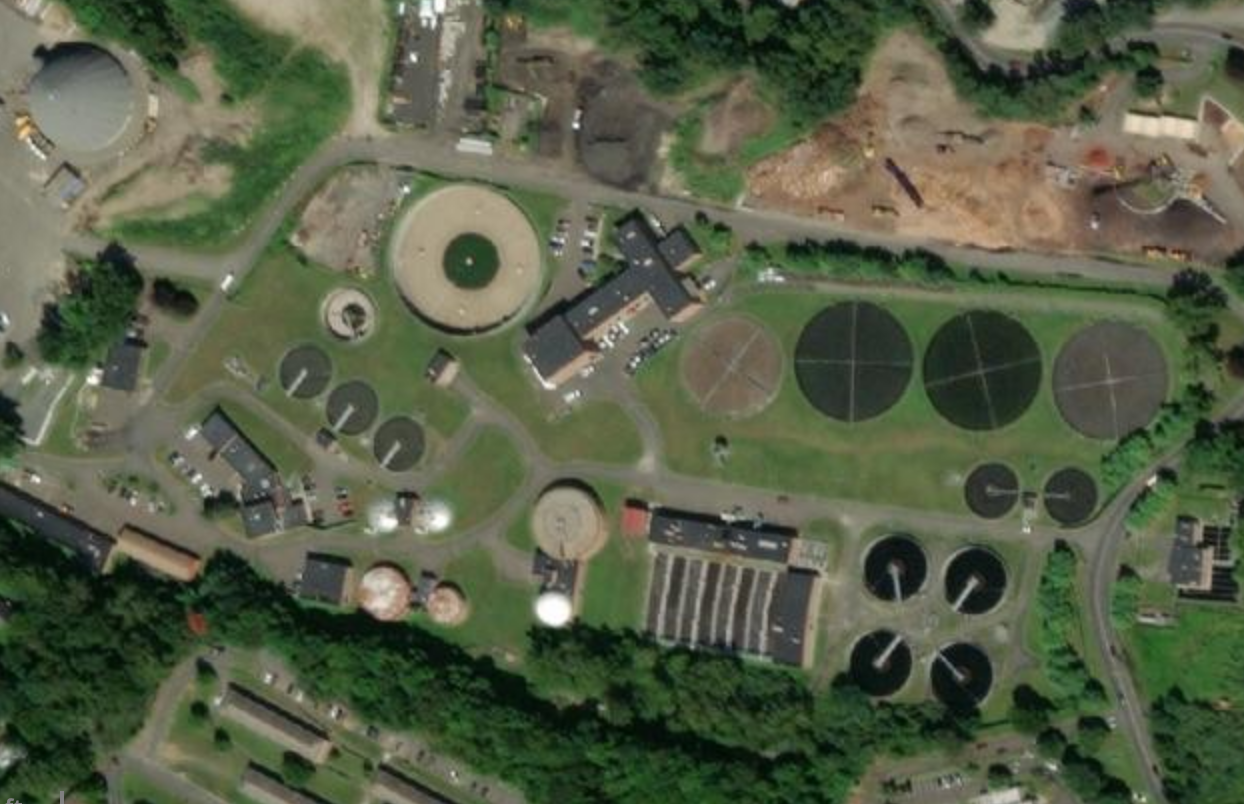
The John Oliver Memorial Sewer Plant, located on Plumtrees Road, Danbury

The Public Utilities Division maintains Danbury's water division, water utility infrastructure, sanitary sewer infrastructure, which includes several large water supply dams, a closed landfill, landfill gas collection system, and administer programs for recycling and disposal of solid waste. The sewer fund makes up 80 percent of Danbury's 2019–2020 budget, accounting for $103 million of the $127 million budget to maintain the plant.

In October 2020, the city renamed its water pollution control plant the John Oliver Memorial Sewer Plant after John Oliver, the host of the late-night comedy program Last Week Tonight with John Oliver jokingly insulted the city. Oliver attended the unveiling ceremony in person as a condition of Mayor Boughton.

=== Danbury Federal Correctional Institution ===
Danbury is the site of a low-security men's and women's prison, the Danbury Federal Correctional Institution. Built in the 1940s to house men, the facility was converted to a women's prison in 1994 to address a shortage of beds for low-security female inmates in other facilities. Overcrowding at federal facilities for low-security males prompted a reconversion to a male prison, beginning in 2013, and relocation of the female inmates from the low-security Pembroke Road facility to other locations. As of 2016, an adjacent satellite camp houses up to 193 women. A new $25 million women's facility was completed and began accepting female inmates in December 2016.

== Notable people ==
- Renata Adler, author, journalist and film critic
- Willard H. Allen (1893–1957), New Jersey secretary of agriculture
- Marian Anderson (1897–1993), singer
- James Montgomery Bailey, 19th century Danbury News editor
- Matt Barnes, professional baseball player
- Zadoc Benedict, the first hat maker of Danbury
- Jonathan Brandis (1976–2003), actor
- Peter Buck (1930–2021), co-founder, Subway sandwich restaurants
- Roger Burlingame (1889–1967), historian and author
- Austin Calitro, professional football player
- Ray Cappo, singer
- Neil Cavuto, television anchor
- Thomas Maitland Cleland (1880–1964), illustrator and typographer
- Frank Conniff (1914–1971), 1956 Pulitzer Prize–winning journalist
- Rachel Crothers (1870–1958), Broadway playwright, director, and advocate for women in theater
- Jean Dalrymple (1902–1998), Tony Award-winning Broadway producer and theater manager
- Katherine Dreier (1877–1952), abstract painter, art collector, and co-founder of the Société Anonyme
- Mackenzie Fierceton, activist
- Ken Green, professional golfer
- Lee Hartell, Medal of Honor recipient
- Charles Ives (1874–1954), composer
- Steven Kaplan, American economist and professor
- Carole King, singer-songwriter
- Joe Lahoud, professional baseball player
- Rose Wilder Lane, author, writer, daughter of Laura Ingalls Wilder
- Jimmy Monaghan, Irish musician and former boxer
- Jerry Nadeau, professional auto racing driver
- Steven Novella, neurologist and noted skeptic
- Laura Nyro (1947–1997), musician, songwriter, bandleader, singer
- Alex Pereira, Professional MMA Fighter in the Ultimate Fighting Championship (UFC) and current champion of the Light heavyweight (MMA) division, former champion of the Middleweight (MMA)division
- Elizabeth Peyton, painter
- Chet Powers a.k.a. Dino Valenti (1937–1994), musician and songwriter
- George Radachowsky, professional football player
- William R. Ratchford, three term U.S. Congressman
- Allen Ritter, music producer
- Delvin Rodríguez, professional boxer
- Neil Rudenstine, past president of Harvard University
- James A. Ryan, U.S. Army brigadier general
- Chauncey Foster Ryder, Postimpressionist painter
- Ted Shawn (1891–1972), dancer and choreographer
- Trevor Siemian, professional football player
- Christian Siriano, fashion designer
- Ian Smith, panelist on VH1's Celebrity Fit Club
- Lee Smith, Member of the Baseball Hall of Fame, Relief Pitcher
- Ronnie Spector, singer
- Sylvia Sydney (1910–1999), actress
- Glover Teixeira, Professional MMA Fighter in the Ultimate Fighting Championship (UFC) and former champion of the Light heavyweight (MMA) division
- Roy M. Terry, Chief of Chaplains of the U.S. Air Force
- John Toland (1912–2004), 1971 Pulitzer Prize-winning historian
- TJR (birth name Thomas Joseph Rozdilsky), musician
- John Hubbard Tweedy, U.S. Congressional Delegate from the Wisconsin Territory
- Samuel Tweedy (1776–1868), U.S. Representative from Connecticut
- Jenna von Oÿ, actress
- William A. Whittlesey, former U.S. Congressman
- Zalmon Wildman (1775–1835), U.S. Representative from Connecticut
- R. Gordon Wasson (1898–1986), banker, author, and pioneering ethnomycologist known for popularizing psilocybin mushrooms

== In popular culture ==
- The Netflix series Orange Is the New Black was based on the Federal Women's Prison located in Danbury.
