= Union Savings Bank =

Bank in Connecticut, United States

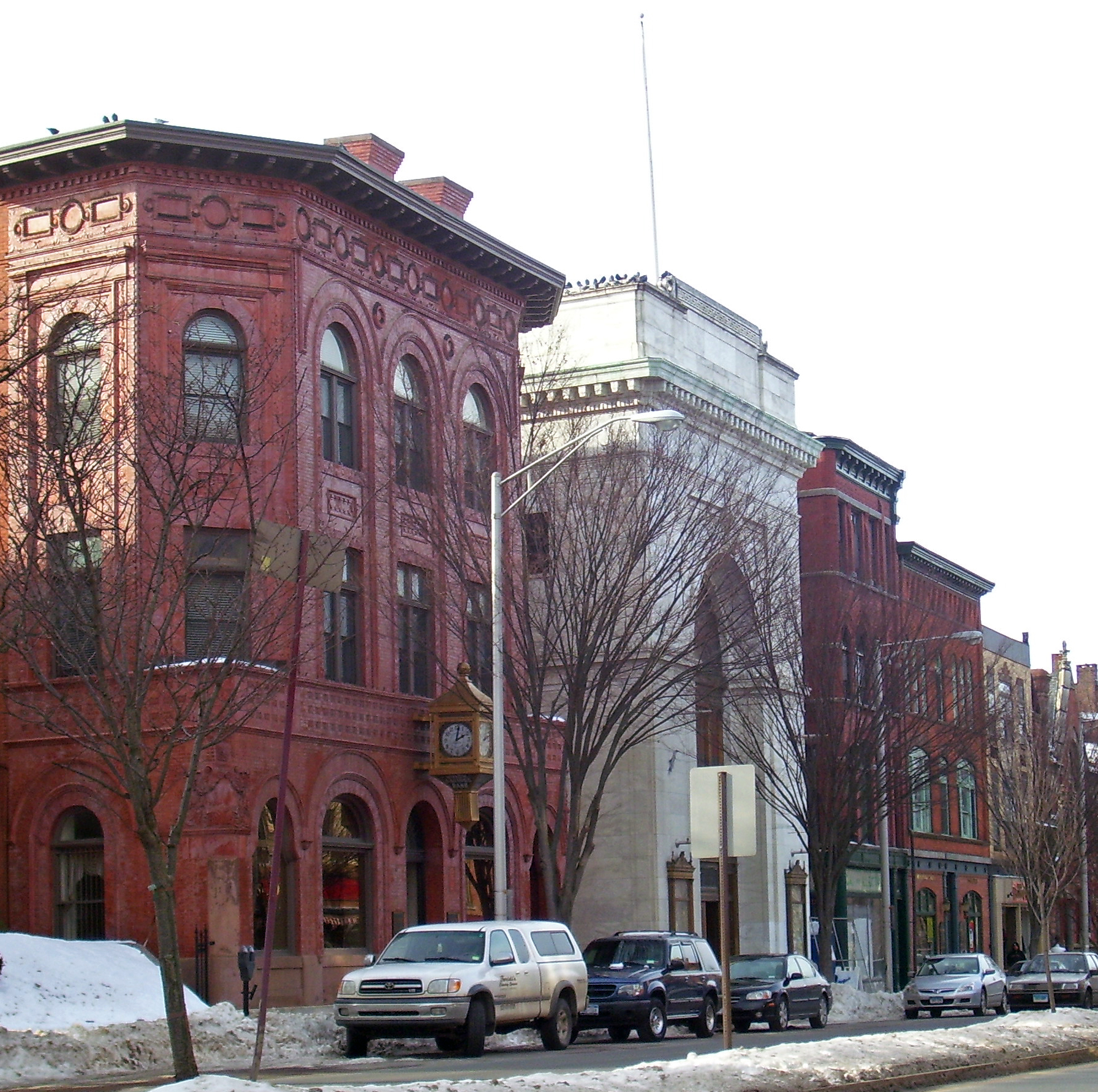
- Union Savings Bank Headquarters (left) at 226-228 Main Street in Danbury, Connecticut.
- Type: Corporation
- Industry: Community bank, Wealth management
- Founded: 1866
- Headquarters: Danbury, Connecticut
- Number of locations: 26
- Area served: Connecticut
- Key people: Chelen Reyes (President & CEO)
- Revenue: ▼$75.491 million (2020)
- Net income: ▼$17.790 million (2020)
- Total assets: ▲$2.735 billion (2020)
- Website: unionsavings.com

Branch locations map (as of May 2018)

Union Savings Bank, is a full-service Community bank and wealth management institution serving customers in Western Connecticut. The bank is headquartered in Danbury, Connecticut and was founded in 1866.

== History ==
The mutual savings bank was founded as the Union Savings Bank of Danbury by a group of Danbury citizens including James S. Taylor, the bank’s first president. The Legislature of the State of Connecticut authorized the incorporation of the bank on June 20, 1866. The bank was first located in a store owned by trustee Samuel Stebbins on Main Street in Danbury. In June 2016, the bank celebrated its 150th year of being in business.

=== Main Office ===
In 1887, the architectural firm Berg & Clark of New York City was selected to design the bank’s current office at 226 Main Street in Danbury, also known as the "United Banks Building". Until 1925, Union Savings Bank co-occupied the first floor of the three-story Romanesque Victorian building with the National Pahquioque Bank. That year, an expansion of the building saw the main entry relocated to the center of the building where it resides today. The second and third floors at the time housed the high school, a 500-seat ballroom and the YMCA, among other offices.

Years after Union Savings Bank became the sole occupant of the United Banks Building, repairs were made to the bank’s vault area following a bomb attack and robbery in 1970. At the same time, modern amenities including acoustic tiles, fluorescent lights and a drive-up window were added, and a one-story addition was built at the back of the building.

In 1983, Union Savings Bank became a part of the area known as the Main Street Historic District. Two decades later, further renovations included raising ceilings to the maximum height, replacing original mechanical systems and replacing the teller counters, maintaining the 1925 aesthetic. During this renovation, pieces of frieze and molding from the original lobby were discovered and protected with Christo wrap.

=== Merger with The First National Bank of Litchfield ===
In 2010, Union Savings Bank expanded its branch offices into Litchfield County through a merger with The First National Bank of Litchfield, the oldest nationally chartered bank in the state of Connecticut. The First National Bank of Litchfield had been in operation in Litchfield County for 196 years.

== Leadership ==
Chelen Reyes is the current president and CEO of Union Savings Bank, following Cynthia C. Merkle, who served from 2019 to 2024. Other members of the leadership team include Paul Bruce, executive vice president and chief financial officer and treasurer, Frederick “Rick” F. Judd, III, CFP, executive vice president and head of wealth management. Marlene Piche, executive vice president and head of consumer and business banking, and Joseph Morrissey, head of commercial lending.

A board of trustees and team of corporators also contribute to company leadership.

== Union Savings Bank Foundation ==
The Union Savings Bank Foundation was established in 1998 to provide contributions to charitable organizations and non-profits in Connecticut. The Bank makes annual contributions to sustain the foundation’s endowment.

Each year during an open application period, 501(c)(3) non-profit organizations are invited to submit requests to receive grants from the foundation. In 2018, these grants contributed $202,525 to 18 different local non-profit organizations in Connecticut.

Organizations that receive support from the foundation serve a range of needs including child and family services, medical and dental care for low-income individuals and educational resources for underserved communities. Since 2016, the foundation has focused its efforts primarily on education, forming the USB Teachers’ Closet to help provide school supplies to teachers in local communities.
