= Zadoc Benedict =

American hat manufacturer

Zadoc Benedict was an American hat manufacturer who established the first hat factory on Main Street in Danbury, Connecticut in 1780. It had 3 employees, and made 18 hats weekly.

Legend holds that Benedict plugged a hole in his shoe with rabbit fur, and found that over time the fur turned into felt. He then supposedly developed a process of making hats from the fur of locally available animals, like rabbit and beaver.
