= Kohanza Reservoir =

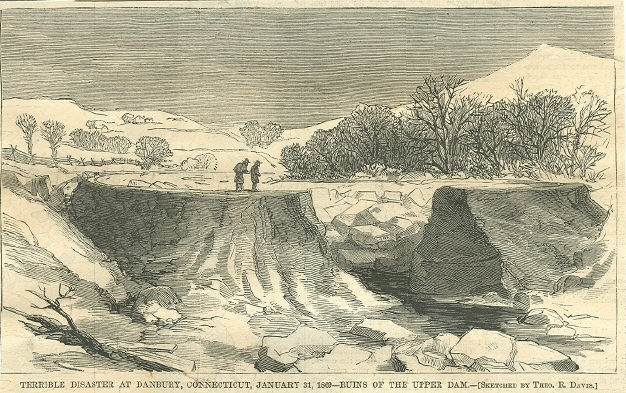
- Kohanza Reservoir disaster, January 31, 1869

- Location within Connecticut
- Interactive map of Kohanza Reservoir
- Location: Danbury, Connecticut
- Type: Reservoir
- Basin countries: United States
- Built: 1866

The Kohanza Reservoir was a reservoir in Danbury, Connecticut. Construction was completed in 1866. It was the first of many reservoirs built to supply Danbury's hat factories. The dam broke on January 31, 1869. The ensuing flood of ice and water killed 11 people in half an hour, and caused major damage to many homes and farms, as well as uprooting trees and moving boulders.

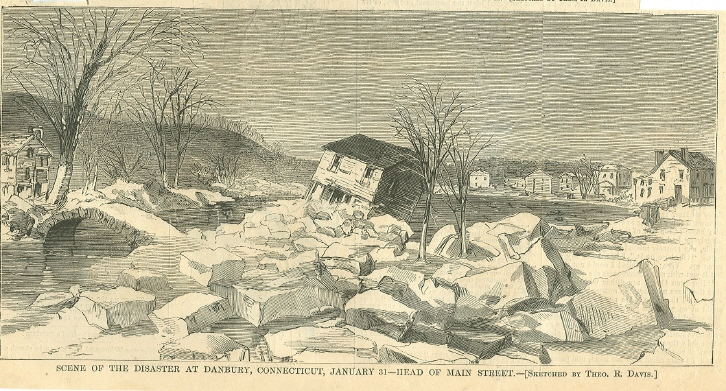
Kohanza Reservoir disaster, January 31, 1869

== Present day ==
The reservoir still exists in two smaller sections:

- Upper Kohanza Lake (41.4234°N 73.4935°W)
- Lower Kohanza Lake (41.4157°N 73.4783°W).
