= Ives Trail =

Hiking trail in the United States of America

Ives Trail & Greenway
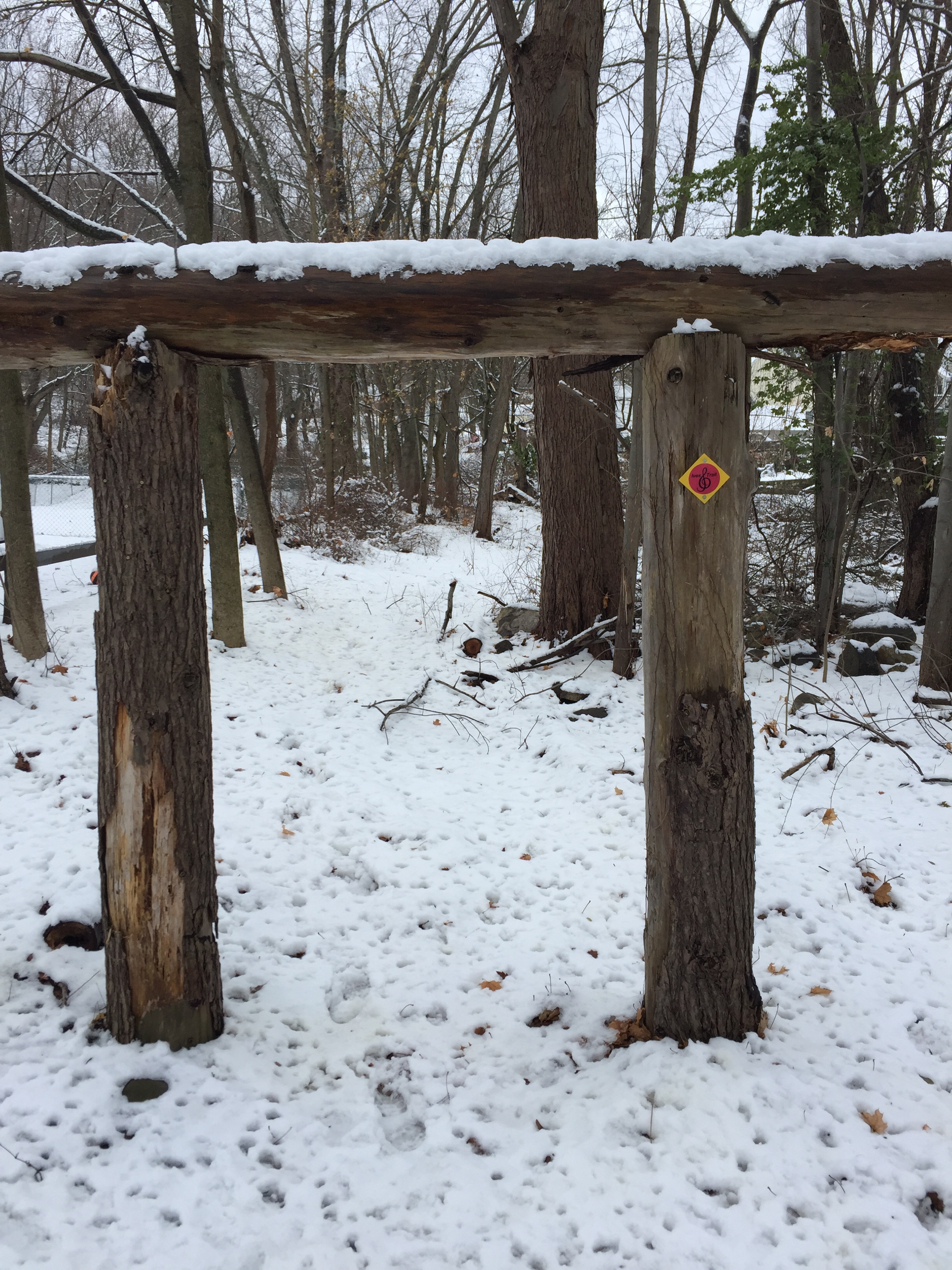
- Original entrance to Ives Trail Danbury, Connecticut.
- Length: 20 mi (32 km)
- Location: Ridgefield, Danbury, Bethel and Redding Connecticut
- Trailheads: Bennett's Pond State Park 41.32886°N 73.48086°W; Opposite West Redding Post Office, 268 Simpaug Turnpike, Redding, CT 06896 CT (This is the nearest parking. The trail itself begins inconspicuously about 1/4 mile down Sidecut Road on left hand side.)
- Use: hiking
- Difficulty: easy, with some difficult sections (bypass routes available)
- Sights: Tarrywile Park, Hearthstone Castle
- Hazards: deer ticks, poison ivy

The Ives Trail and Greenway is a 20-mile (32 km) hiking trail in the Housatonic Valley Region (also known as Greater Danbury). Its route connects Ridgefield, Danbury, Bethel and Redding. The Ives Trail is named after Charles Ives, a Danbury-born American modernist composer.

The Ives Trail is maintained through the efforts of the Ives Trail and Greenway Regional Association, a 501(c)(3) non-profit organization.

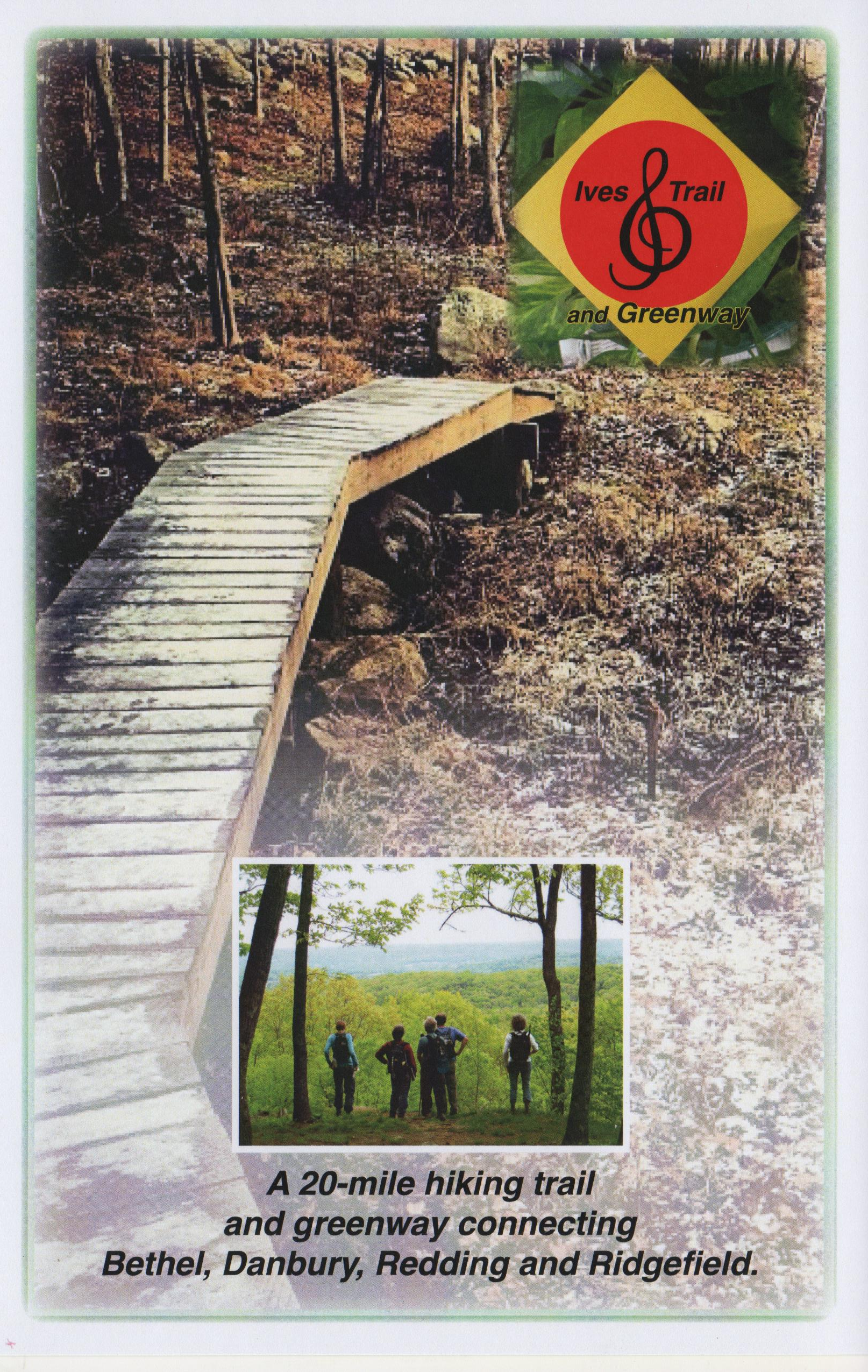
Guidebook Cover

There is a guidebook, which is available at the Tarrywile Mansion.

== Trail description ==
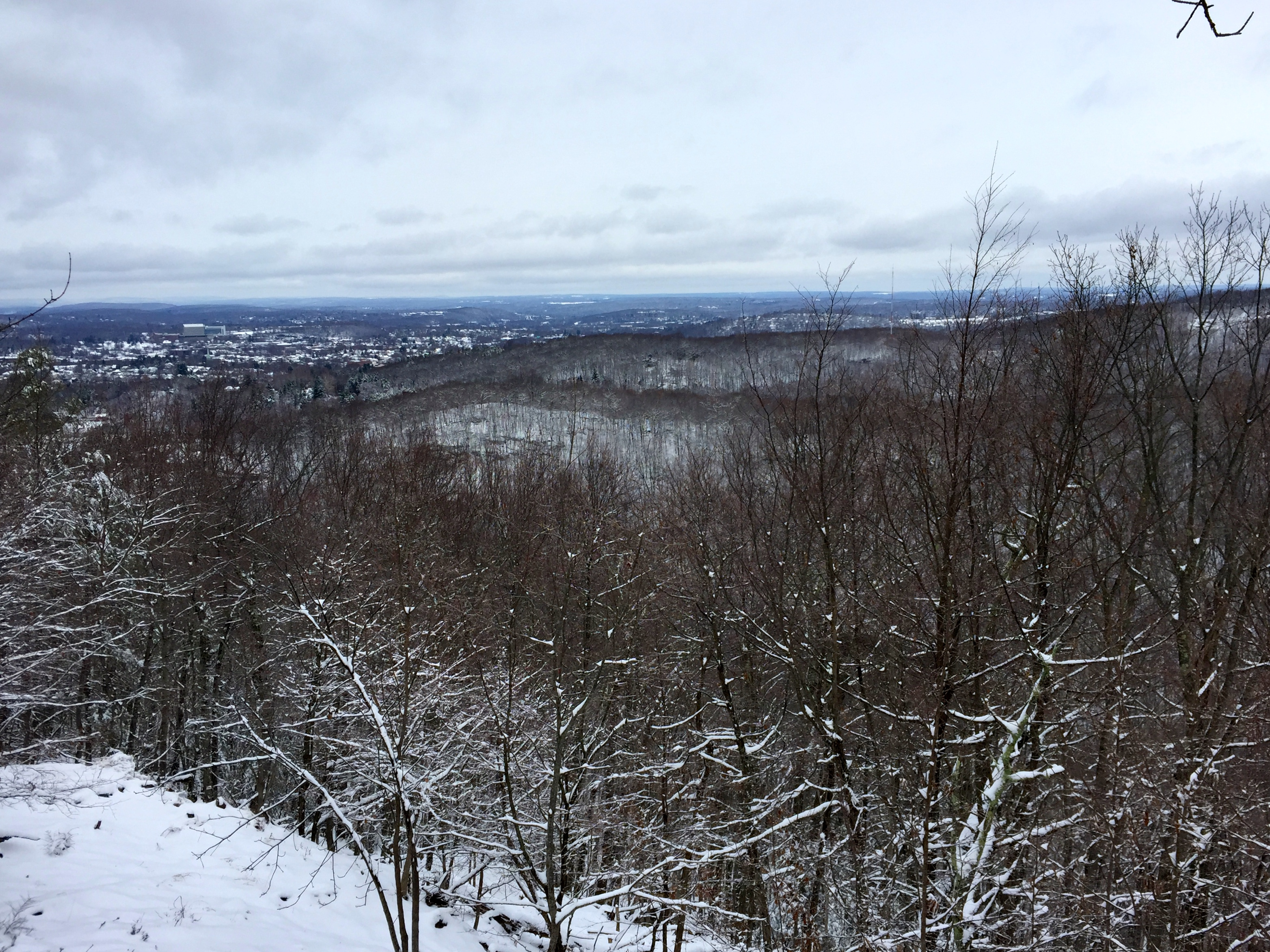
View from Moses Mountain

The Ives Trail is primarily used for hiking, backpacking and picnicking.

The trail passes through both public and private lands. Sections of the trail may be used by bicycles and horses. Motorized vehicles are not allowed on any section of the trail. The trail goes over several significant steep areas and is rugged in places. Parts of it are not suitable for casual hikers.

=== Trail route ===
The trail goes from Bennett's Pond in Ridgefield to the Hemlock Hills open space into the western section of Wooster Mountain State Park, crosses Rt 7 at a crosswalk, enters the eastern section of Wooster Mountain State Park, goes through an easement area and into Tarrywile Park.

From Tarrywile Park it goes through several easement areas and emerges onto Long Ridge Road. From Long Ridge Road it enters into the Wiedel Meadows and another easement area and eventually into the Terre Haute property of Bethel and Redding Open Space.

The easement areas do not permit bikes.

=== Trail communities ===
The Ives Trail is entirely within the state of Connecticut and passes through the towns of Ridgefield, Danbury, Bethel and Redding.

== Landscape, geology, and natural environment ==
The terrain is variable throughout the length of the trail, including rolling hills, open fields, rugged steep sections, cliffs and overlooks. Geologically, there are some very impressive glacial erratics in the Pine Mountain (Ridgefield) section of the trail. From overlooks, the parallel north-south ridge lines leading into the Litchfield hills become apparent.

Significant vernal pools can be found in many places along the trail.

== History and folklore ==
The Ives Trail was conceived by Danbury City Planner Dennis Elpern.

=== Origin and name ===
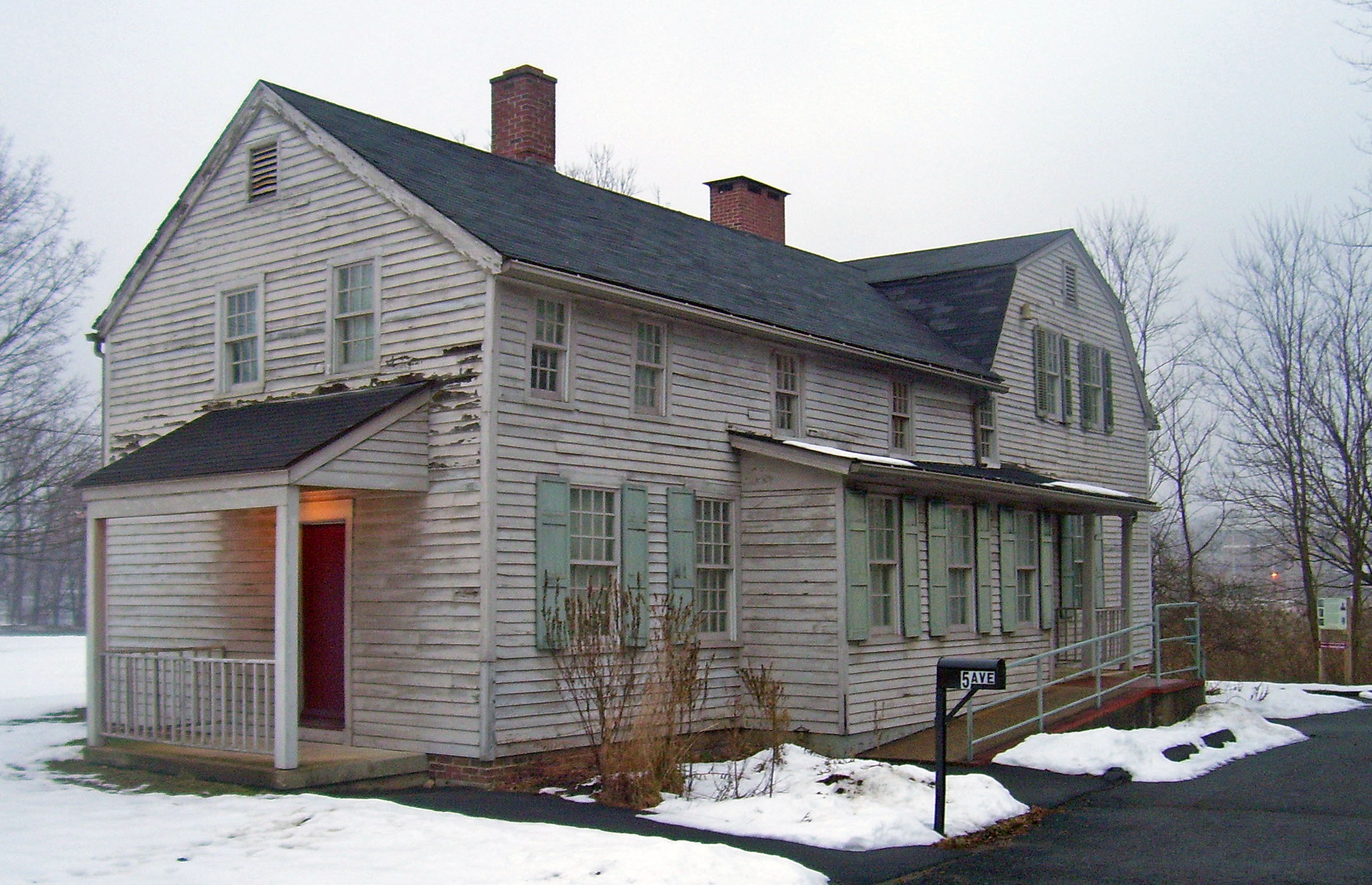
Ives House

=== Historic sites ===
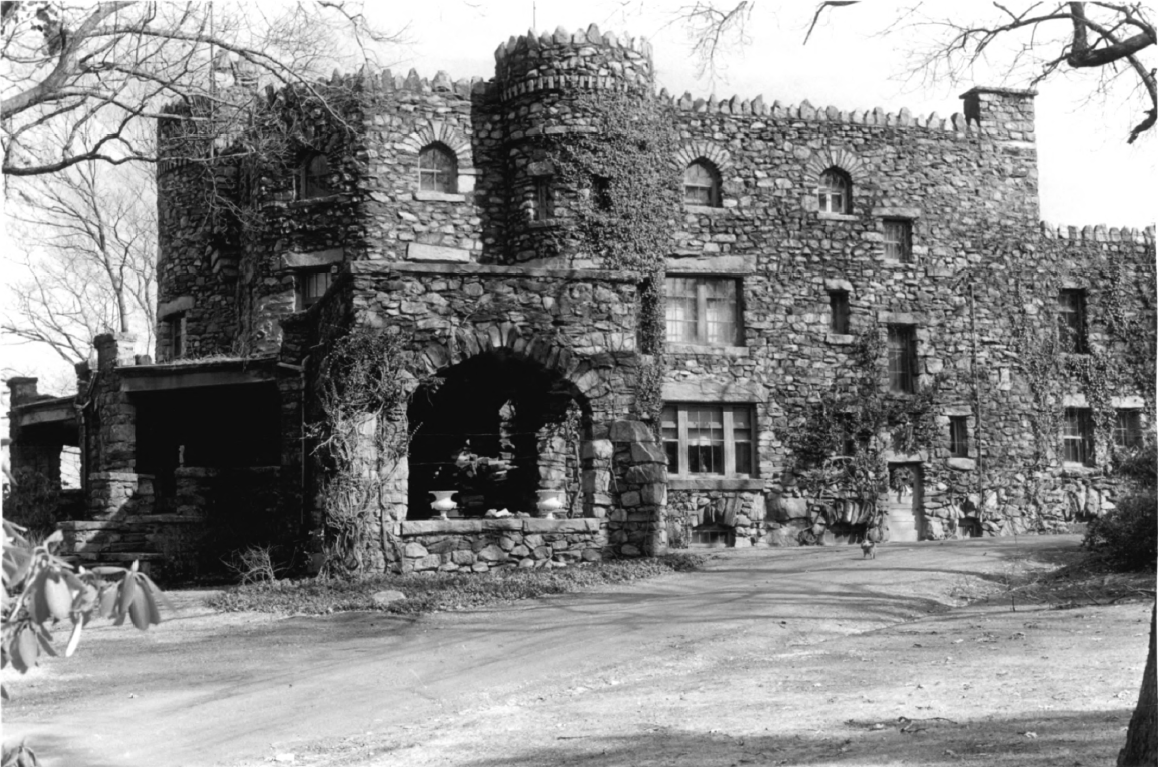
Hearthstone Castle

== Hiking the trail ==
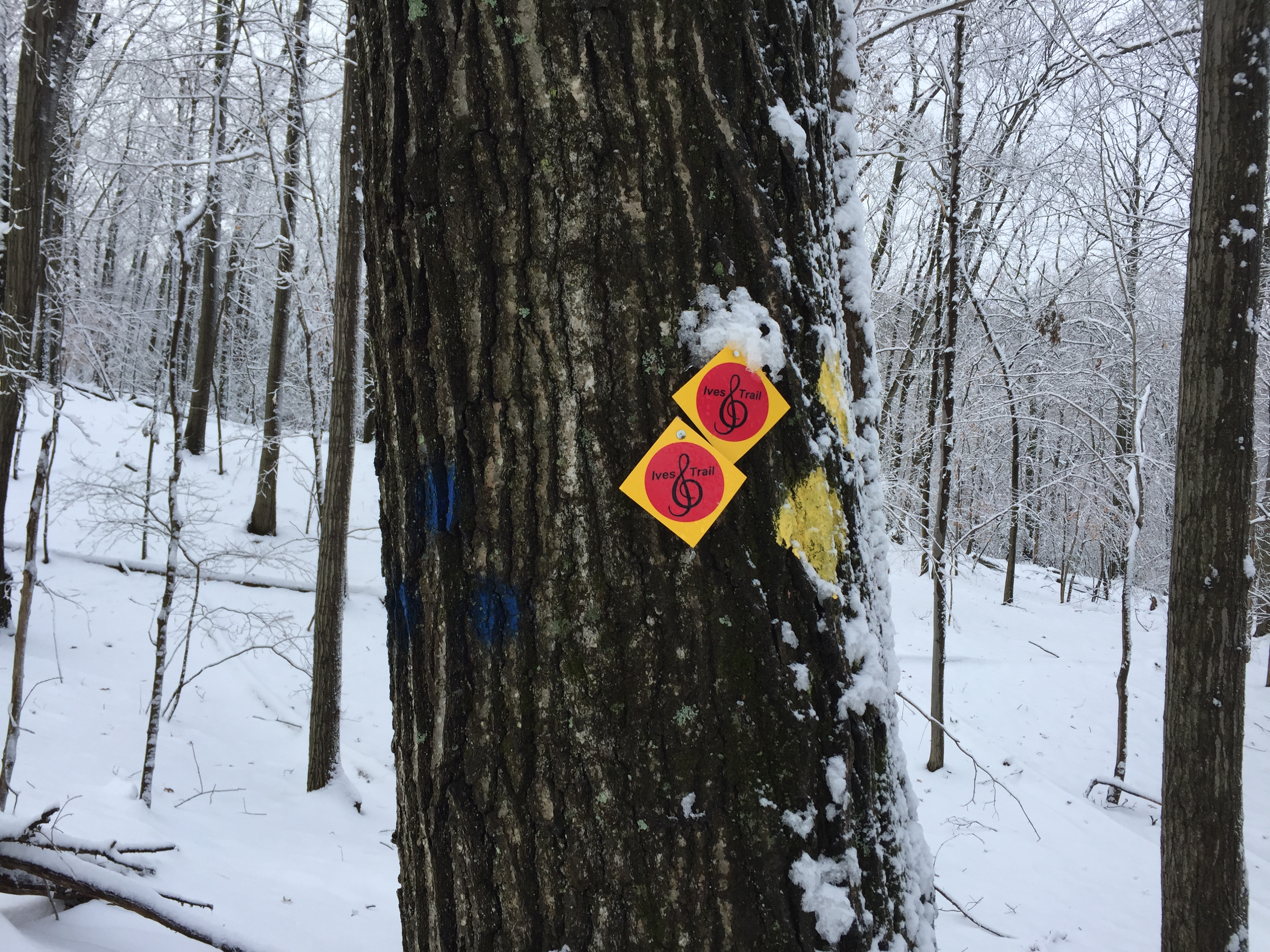
The primary route is marked with yellow and red tags.

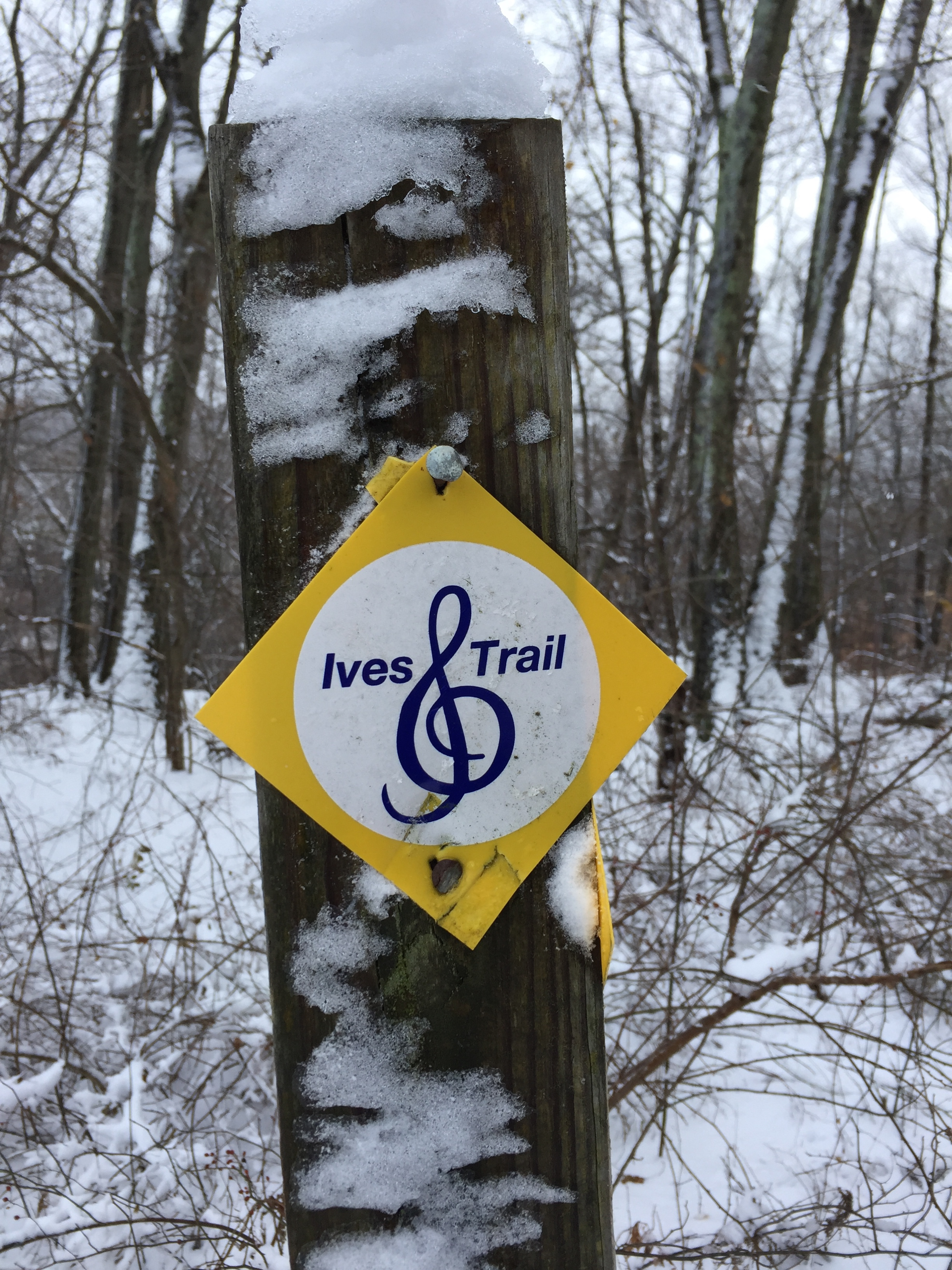
Spurs or alternate routes are marked with yellow and white tags.

== See also ==
- Greater Danbury
- Ridgefield, Connecticut
- Bethel, Connecticut
- Redding, Connecticut
