= Beacon Line =

Metro-North Railroad line in New York

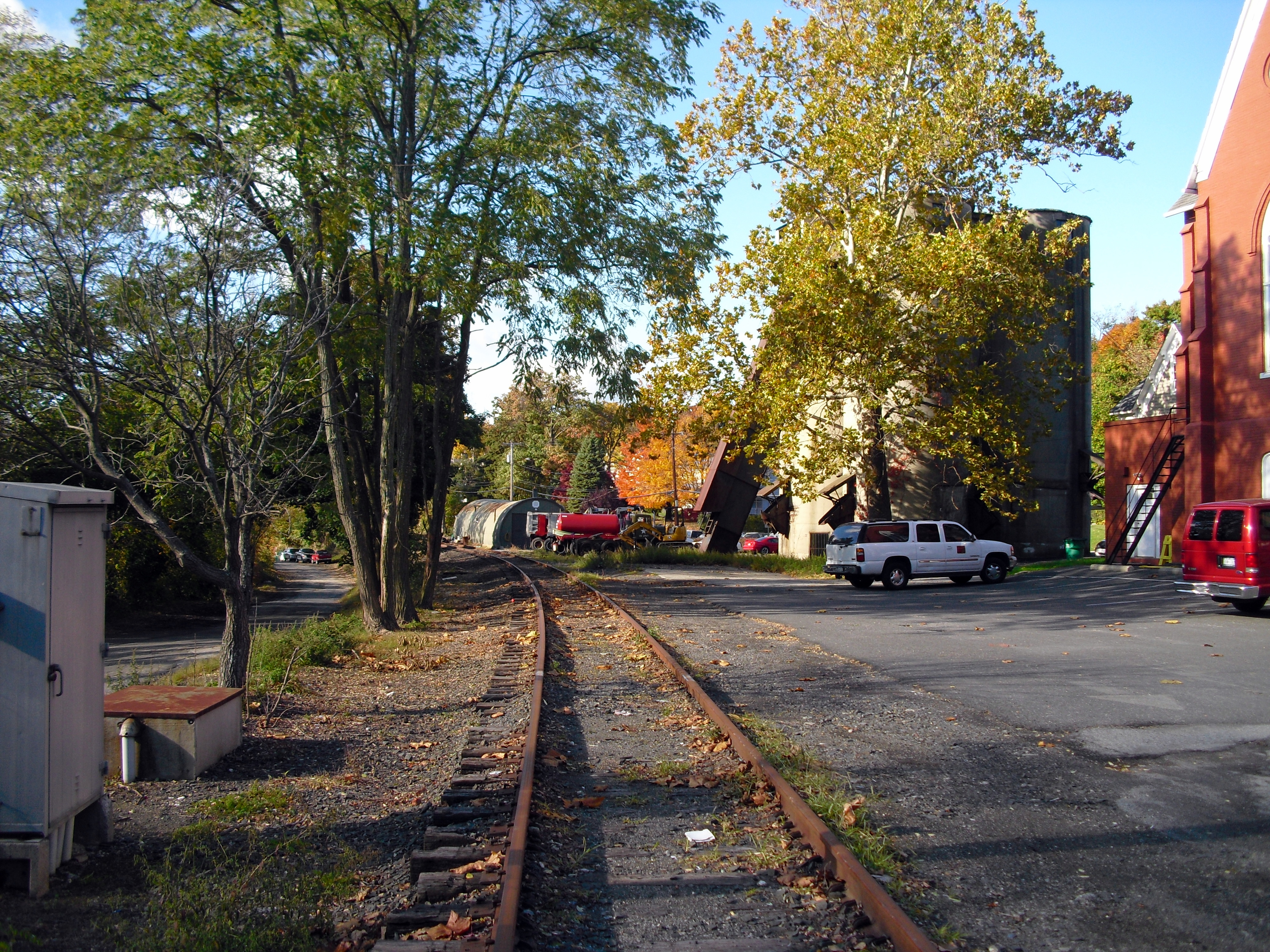
- Beacon Line, Churchill Street, Beacon, New York

Overview
- Status: Out of Service
- Owner: Housatonic Railroad (Connecticut); Metro-North (New York)
- Locale: Dutchess County, New York, Putnam County, New York and Fairfield County, Connecticut
- Termini: Hudson Line, Beacon, New York; Danbury Branch, Danbury, Connecticut
- Stations: none

Service
- Type: Commuter rail line
- System: Metro-North
- Operator(s): Metro-North

Technical
- Track length: 47 miles (76 km)
- Character: single track
- Track gauge: 4 ft 8 1/2 in (1,435 mm) standard gauge

The Metro-North Railroad's Beacon Line is a non-revenue line connecting the railroad's three revenue lines east of the Hudson River. From west to east, the lines that connect are Hudson Line, Harlem Line, and the Danbury Branch of the New Haven Line. It was purchased by Metro-North in 1995 for $4.2 million from Maybrook Properties, a subsidiary of the Housatonic Railroad, to preserve it for future use, training, and equipment moves. Maybrook Properties purchased the line from Conrail after Conrail withdrew from the Danbury, Connecticut, freight market in 1992.

On February 26, 2021, Metro-North announced it would file with the Surface Transportation Board (STB) to seek an adverse discontinuance of the Housatonic Railroad's trackage rights over the line, allowing MNR to abandon the line and convert it to an interim trail. Several studies have been underway to bring Metro-North service between Danbury and Southeast, New York.

== History ==
The Beacon Line consists of parts of two former railroads. The western portion is the Beacon Secondary Track, formerly known as the Newburgh, Dutchess and Connecticut Railroad, which runs from a connection south of Beacon, New York, on the Hudson Line at the former Dutchess Junction to Hopewell Junction. The eastern portion is the Maybrook Line, or Maybrook Branch, which runs from Hopewell Junction to Danbury, Connecticut, where it joins the Danbury Branch. The Beacon Line is considered to end at the Danbury Branch; however, the portion in Connecticut is owned by the Housatonic Railroad, although Metro-North may move trains over that portion. Between Beacon and Brewster the line crosses through several lines of hills, with a large portion of the line on a grade of at least 1 percent and with tight curves. The maximum speed is 25 miles per hour.

Passenger service on the Beacon Line ended in 1927.

The Maybrook Line was the main east–west freight service of the New York, New Haven and Hartford Railroad, which became part of the Penn Central system in 1969, and subsequently Conrail in 1976. Service was originally from Maybrook, New York, in Orange County, via the Poughkeepsie Railroad Bridge through Hopewell Junction, where it connected to the Hudson Line via the Beacon Secondary. It continued to a connection with the Waterbury Branch in Derby, Connecticut. The Housatonic Railroad owns and operates the portion between Danbury and Derby, which is the last remaining portion of the Maybrook which sees active freight use.

The portion west of Hopewell Junction to Maybrook was placed out of service when a fire damaged the Poughkeepsie Bridge on May 8, 1974. Penn Central diverted traffic to the lightly-used Beacon Secondary and upgraded it. Freight traffic was abruptly halted in 1992 when Conrail rerouted New England freight trains to Springfield, Massachusetts, via the Boston Line, and then south to New Haven, Connecticut. Infrequent freight service continued for a short while but, as of 1995, there was no freight service on the line.

The refurbished Poughkeepsie Bridge, originally opened on January 1, 1889 with a total length of 6,768 feet and a height above the Hudson of 212 feet, is now a New York State park, Walkway over the Hudson, completed in 2009. The remainder of the Beacon Line has also been placed out of service in a cost-saving measure.

=== Reactivation study ===
In October 2000, Metro-North undertook a feasibility study to determine whether it was operationally, financially, and economically feasible to restore passenger service to the line between Hopewell Junction and Brewster. If service was to be operated, during peak hours, trains would run directly to Grand Central Terminal, while they would run as a shuttle during other times, ending at Southeast. Additional population growth in Dutchess County led to interest in using the line for passenger service. Using projected population growth, projected 2020 daily ridership was to be 3,060. The introduction of the line would reduce ridership on the Wassaic Branch by 20% and on the Hudson Line by 4%. Ridership would be poor, as it would continue to be more time-efficient for people to take Interstate 84 to Southeast where they could transfer to much more frequent electric service. $25 million would have been needed for rolling stock. Two shuttles would run exclusively on the Beacon Line, while three Upper Harlem Line trains would have been extended from Southeast to Hopewell Junction. The construction of a storage yard would have also been necessary if service were to be started. The four station candidates were located at Hopewell Junction, Taconic State Parkway, Green Haven at Route 8, and West Pawling at Route 292. The stations would cost $54–72 million due to the high cost of wetlands mitigation, and because of the possible requirement of a grade-crossing elimination.

The line's speed restriction clearly hampers its ability to attract ridership. Four strategies were considered for raising the speed from 25 miles per hour to 59 mph. The three discarded options were: rebuild the existing track with wooden ties and with welded rail; rebuild the track with superelevation but reduce curvature within the right-of-way; or to disregard right-of-way constraints and to take property to straighten the line. The best option was to rebuild the track while super-elevating curves, reducing travel times from 42 minutes to 31 minutes. Nine bridges along the line would have to be rebuilt, and grade crossing protection would have to be installed.

Since service on the line was not deemed to be cost-effective, it was not recommended to reactivate the line at the time.

== Route geography ==
The Beacon Line's western terminus is a short distance south of the Beacon station. The line heads south parallel to the Hudson Line for a short distance, then turns eastward to cross over the Hudson Line via a bridge.

Between the Hudson and Harlem lines, the Beacon runs a winding route, visible from many highways in Dutchess County. Interstate 84 crosses overhead just east of Exit 12 in Fishkill. U.S. Route 9 and NY 52 have grade crossings with the line, also in Fishkill. In Hopewell Junction, the line has grade crossings with NY 82 and NY 376, before it passes underneath NY 82 for a second time. Motorists on the Taconic State Parkway can see the Beacon Line crossing underneath the highway between the NY 52 exit and the Carpenter Road intersection. The next several miles are mostly rural areas, with the line going around mountains rather than tunneling through them.

In Towners, the Beacon Line crosses the Harlem Line but there is no interlocking between the two lines here. Rather, the Beacon Line turns south, running nearly parallel to the Harlem Line for a few miles as they straddle Ice Pond. A single-track connection runs northeast from the Harlem Line to the Beacon Line in this area.

Continuing south from this junction, the Beacon Line continues nearly parallel to the Harlem for several miles, turning eastward in Brewster. Here, the line again passes under I-84 twice and then under Interstate 684. Despite the line's limited usage, grade crossings are avoided in Brewster.

Heading east from Brewster, the line runs almost parallel with I-84 and U.S. Routes 6/202, which overlap as they cross the border into Connecticut. A short distance east, Routes 6 and 202 cross over the railroad, with the railroad now between the 6/202 concurrency and I-84. Further east, the line runs past the Danbury Fair Mall, before turning north and then east to the Danbury station on the Danbury Branch. The Beacon Line enters the Danbury station from the northwest and the Danbury Branch comes in from the southeast. Running a train between the Danbury Branch and the Beacon Line requires a reverse move.

== Current and future use ==
Metro-North added fiber-optics along the Beacon Line in 2007 as well as signal bungalows at many grade crossings from Beacon to Dykemans. Currently Metro-North operates a facility along the line in Stormville to train MTA Police dogs.

The Beacon Line serves as a route to move trains between Metro-North's various service and maintenance facilities, without the need to move trains to New York City, the only other place all three east-of-Hudson lines are connected. The Housatonic Railroad owns the portion up to the Connecticut-New York border, and possesses the rights to use the entire line. However, the high cost of maintaining a line that does not generate revenue is a chief reason the Beacon Line is not used often. Steep grades over Stormville Mountain are an additional deterrent, especially if longer trains were to be moved.

Many have advocated reactivating the line for passenger service. Although no such service is currently contemplated, it was one of the reasons for the purchase of the line.

On the morning of March 7, 2011, when heavy downpours washed out part of the right-of-way on the Danbury Branch just south of Bethel, 5 locomotives and 25 rail cars were stranded in Danbury Yard. Because these trains were needed for passenger service and the repairs were expected to last at least two weeks, the MTA decided to move the equipment over the Beacon Line to the Harlem Line just north of Brewster, where the trains were moved south to the Mott Haven Wye, where they were sent back up the New Haven Line to Stamford for passenger service. Multiple cars were coupled, with the trains operating at restricted speed.

One current use of the line is as the Dutchess Rail Trail. The portion of the line which was the former Maybrook Line was double-tracked; the Beacon Secondary Track was single-tracked. Dutchess County acquired right-of-way along the Beacon Secondary to continue Phase III of the rail-trail project. A dual-use bicycle and walking trail, the extended Maybrook Trailway, has been completed along a 25-mile stretch of the Beacon Line from near to the North end of the Putnam County Trailway in Carmel, New York, northwards to the south end of the Dutchess Rail Trail in Hopewell Junction, NY. The trail was completed in January 2021. The Maybrook Trailway through here was built as a "rail with trail" project, with paved trailway running parallel to existing track.

In February 2021, Metro-North filed to abandon a 41-mile (66 km) segment of the Beacon Line between Beacon and the New York-Connecticut border, pursuant to the Housatonic Railroad's trackage rights being resolved. This would allow for the extension of the Empire State Trail. Housatonic indicated its opposition to the proposed abandonment. The two railroad companies began discussing a settlement of the issue in September 2022. The Housatonic Railroad notified the STB it was no longer opposing the abandonment in January 2023, and the MTA sought approval to convert the line into a rail trail. The STB denied Metro-North's abandonment and trail conversion request in July 2023, citing procedural and legal issues with the filing. Metro-North again filed for abandonment in December 2023. The filing was approved and took effect in February 2024.

== Station listing ==
There is no current passenger service on the Beacon Line. The station stops listed (from west to east) are according to railroad timetable and serve as "control points". They may or may not conform to historical stops nor planned locations for any future service. Passenger service ceased in 1927.

NOTE: Stations along original D&C line are shaded in darker gray. Former passenger stations on current portions of the Beacon Line include the following:

| State | Milepost | City | Station | Opening date | Connections and notes |
|---|---|---|---|---|---|
| NY | | Beacon | Beacon | | Terminus near New York Central Railroad to the north originally Fishkill Landing |
| NY | | | Dutchess Junction | | junction with New York Central Railroad (Dutchess Junction) to the south originally Matteawan |
| NY | | | Dennings Junction | | junction with Boston, Hartford and Erie Railroad spur to Dennings Point; 1868-1870 |
| NY | | Beacon | Matteawan | | Wickopee Junction splits the line between Dutchess Junction and Fishkill Landing |
| NY | | Glenham | Glenham | | at Washington Avenue near Old Town Road. Currently a Metro-North "control point." |
| NY | | Fishkill | Fishkill | | Currently a Metro-North "control point." |
| NY | | Brinckerhoff | Brinckerhoff | | |
| NY | | Hopewell; Junction | Hopewell Junction | | junction with Newburgh, Dutchess and Connecticut Railroad (NYNH&H) and Dutchess County Railroad (NYNH&H). Currently a Metro-North "control point." |
| NY | | Stormville | Stormville | | |
| NY | | Green Haven | Green Haven | | |
| NY | | Poughquag | Poughquag | | Near the Appalachian Trail, which is also a Metro-North "control point." |
| NY | | West Pawling | West Pawling | | |
| NY | | Whaley Lake | Whaley Lake | | |
| NY | | Holmes | Holmes | | Currently a Metro-North "control point." |
| NY | | | West Patterson | | |
| NY | | Towners | Towner's | | bridge over New York and Harlem Railroad (NYC) |
| NY | | Towners | Harlem Junction | | Not a station. Junction with New York and Harlem Railroad (NYC) |
| NY | | Dykemans | Dykeman's | | Currently a Metro-North "control point." |
| NY | | Brewster | Brewster | | junction with New York and Putnam Railroad (NYC) and New York and Harlem Railroad (NYC) |
| CT | | Danbury | Mill Plain | | |
| CT | | Danbury | Fair Grounds | | Conditional station for the former Danbury Fair |
| CT | | Danbury | Danbury | | junction with New York, Housatonic and Northern Railroad (NYNH&H) and Danbury and Norwalk Railroad (NYNH&H). Currently a Metro-North "control point." |
Maybrook Line continues to Derby, Connecticut

Hopewell Junction is not listed as an abandoned station, as, though it was a Maybrook Line station, its location placed it on the now-abandoned stretch from Hopewell Junction to Poughkeepsie. Throughout the entire Beacon Line, all platforms were low-level, with one track, non-electrified.
