= King Street, Danbury, Connecticut =

Residential neighborhood in Danbury, Connecticut, United States

- Neighborhood
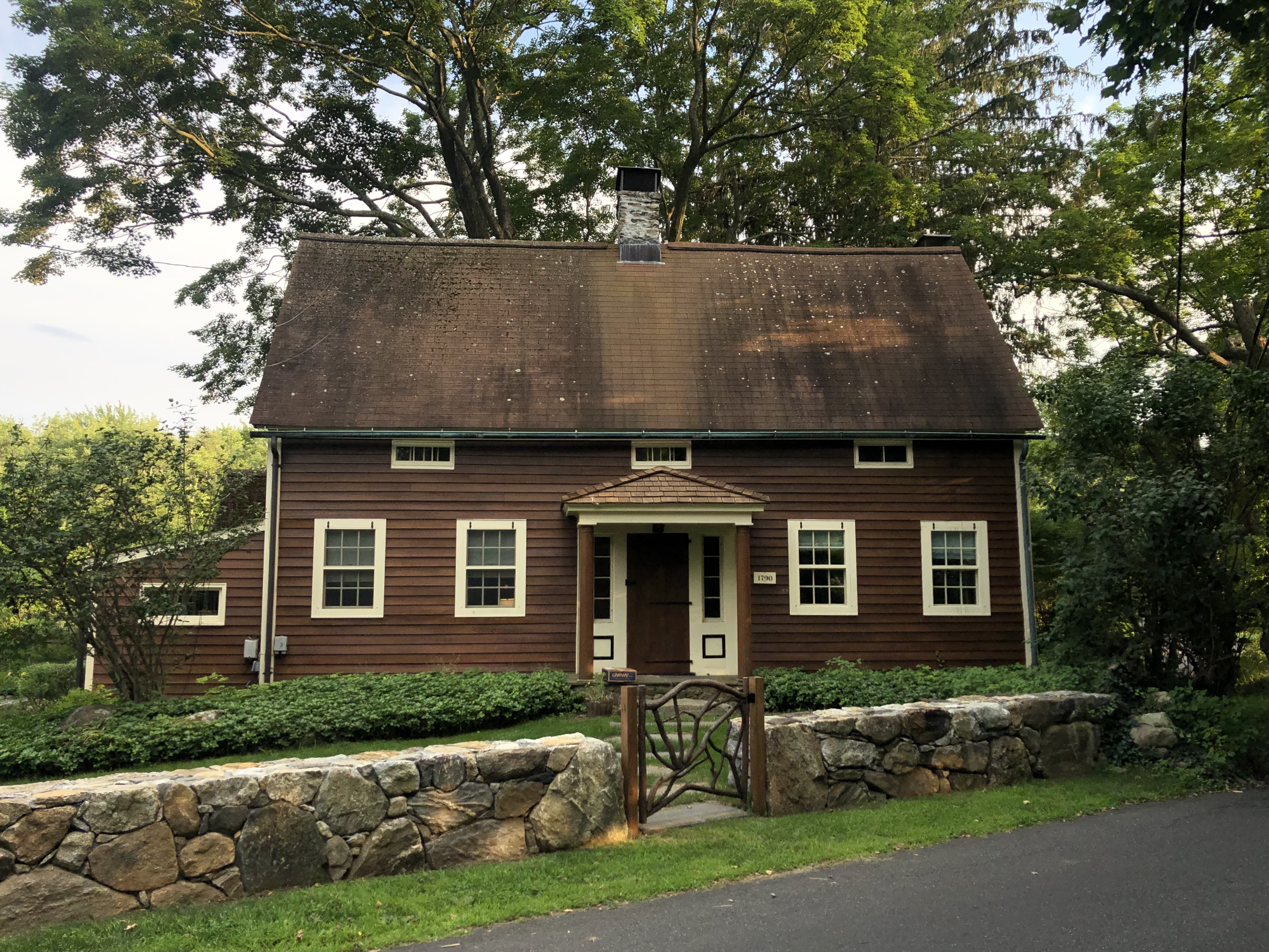

- Location in Connecticut Location in the United States
- Coordinates: 41°25′54.8″N 73°30′28.4″W
- Country: United States
- U.S. state: Connecticut
- County: Fairfield
- Region: Western CT
- City: Danbury

King Street is a residential neighborhood and former district in Danbury, Connecticut. Located in the northwest corner of the city, it borders the Milltown section of Southeast, New York to the west and the town of New Fairfield, Connecticut, to the north.

The name King Street is an eponym of its main thoroughfares: King, South King, West King, and East King Streets.

== History ==
The King Street District, as it was known at the time of its founding in 1769, was given its name by early settlers from Greenwich, Connecticut. More specifically, it is derived from King Street in Greenwich, which is similarly located in the westernmost section of town, on the border of New York.

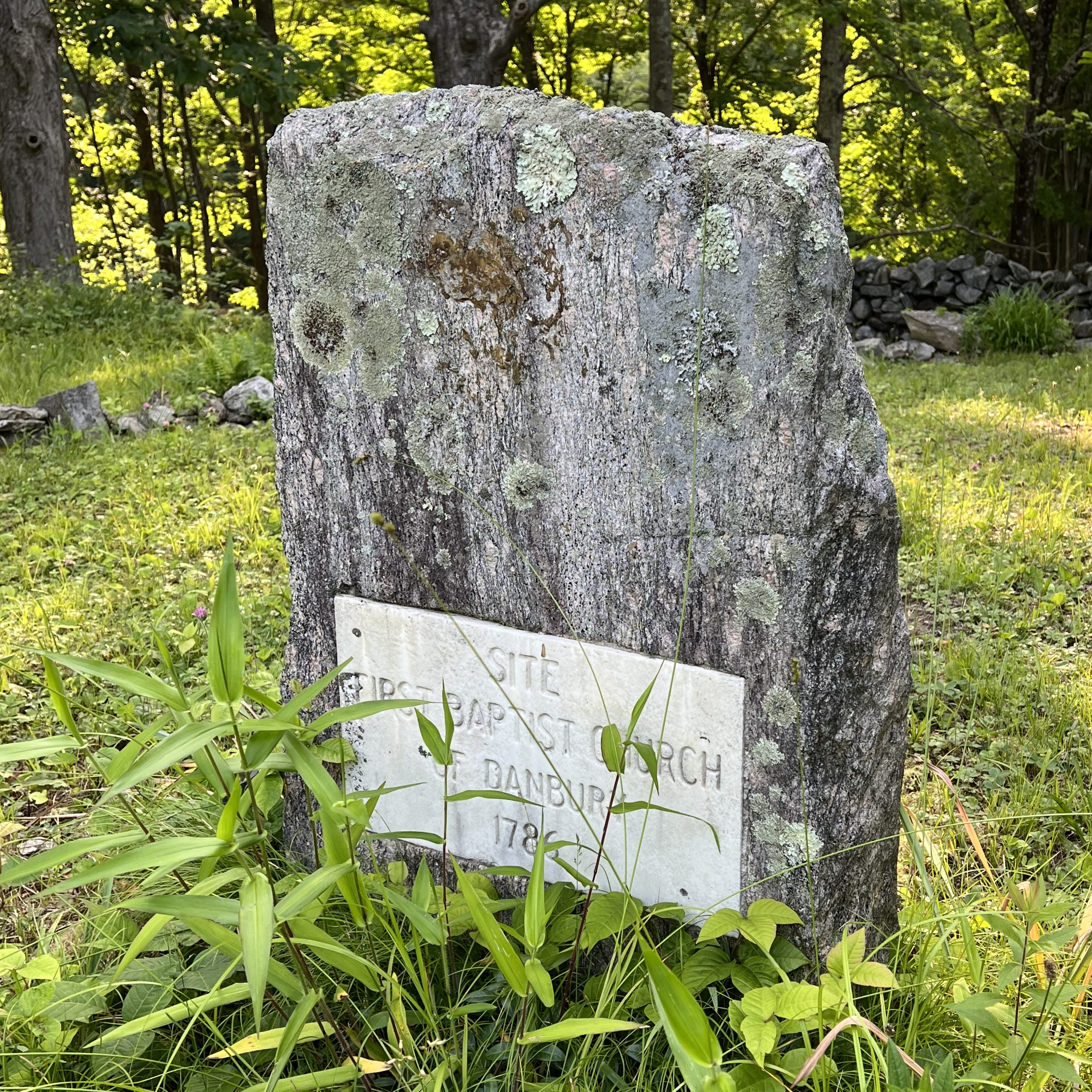
Historical marker at the original site of the First Baptist Church of Danbury

The First Baptist Church of Danbury was organized here in 1785. In a now famous letter from President Thomas Jefferson, in response to the Danbury Baptists, he provided reassurance that their religious liberties shall be protected, using the phrase "wall of separation" between church and state. The church is no longer standing. All that remains today is a commemorative stone marker within a stone perimeter, which was the foundation of the original structure. There is also a burial ground at the site.

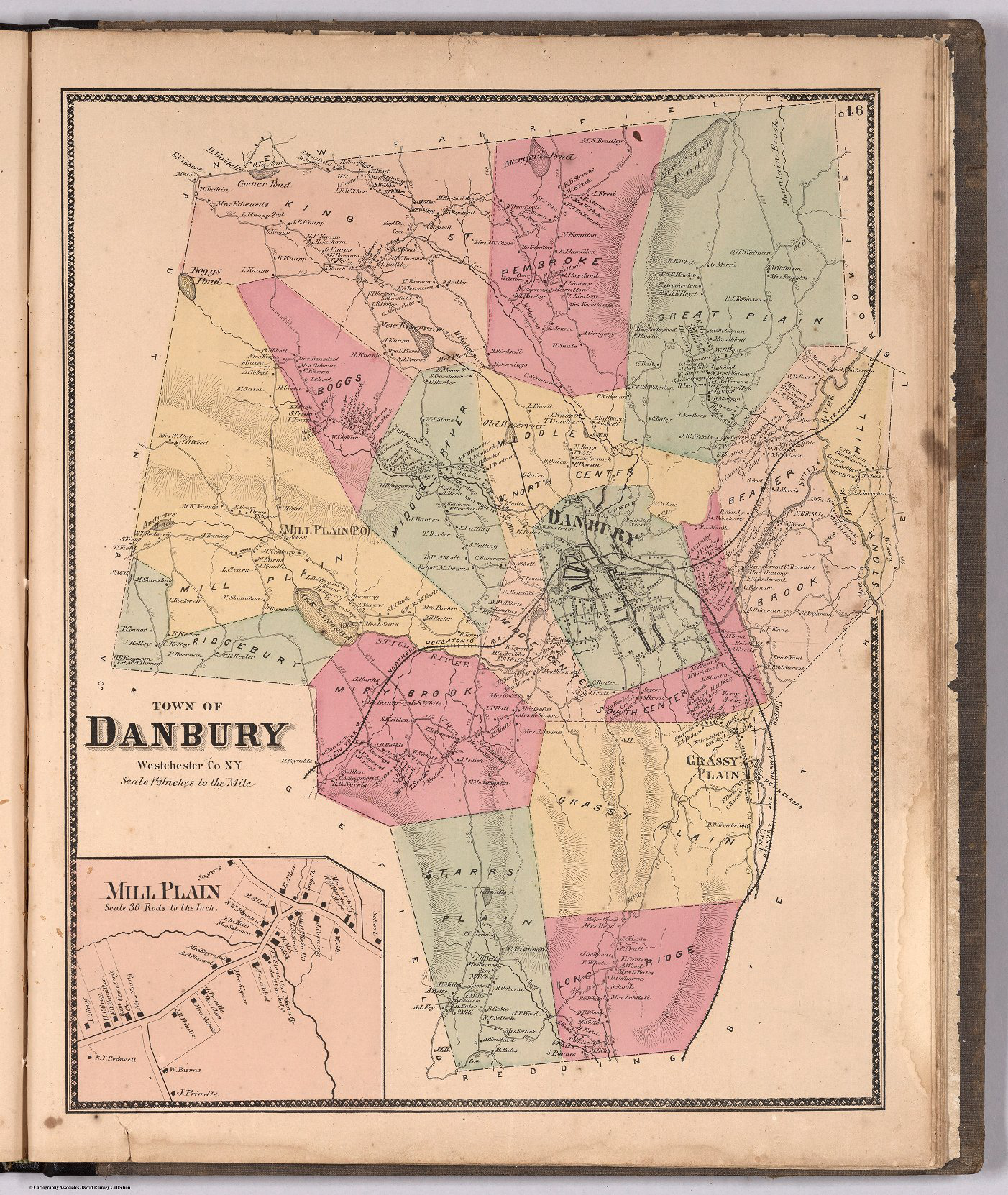
1867 Map of Danbury (King Street District at the top left corner).

The primary congregation in the community has historically been King Street Church, located on the corner of King and South King Street. The Church was founded on August 21, 1830, initially in nearby Putnam County. However, by 1846 the decision was made to put down roots at its current location. In 1931 King Street Church became affiliated with the Congregational denomination, and stands today as King Street United Church of Christ. At the opposite end of South King, which is said to be one of Danbury's oldest roads, is the "Little Red Chapel," built by Elind Comes in 1824. Originally known as Comes Meetinghouse, it was established as a nondenominational place of worship for members of the community. In 1840 it was donated to King Street Church.

In the late 19th century, the King Street District was described as "...purely an agricultural district." However, only few farms remain today, including Overlook Farm, a 130-acre (53 ha) farm that has remained active for over a century, as well as Winter Sunset Farm, a dairy farm at the end of West King.

Like the other rural districts in Danbury of the time, King Street was appointed its own one-room school for the children in the community. The school operated from 1888 to 1939. After the school had been decommissioned, it would serve as a gathering place for different community organizations, such as the local Dorcas Circle. The Danbury Museum and Historical Society would acquire the school in the 1960s, leading to its relocation to a property south of Rogers Park, where it is today.

Despite the school's closure due to consolidation, demand for an elementary school returned to King Street. In 1962 the Danbury School Building committee announced the purchase of the future site of the elementary school, and by September of that year, the official bid for construction had been received. The King Street Elementary School opened in 1964. Twelve years later King Street Primary School opened and the elementary school became King Street Intermediate School.

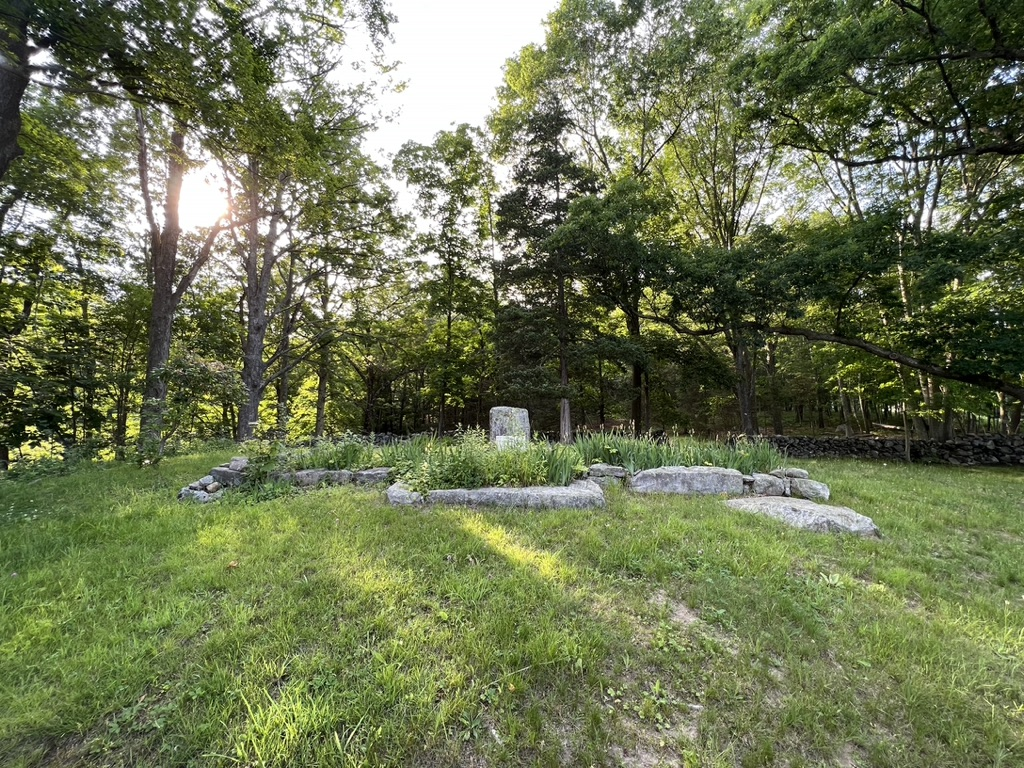
Remains of the First Baptist Church of Danbury

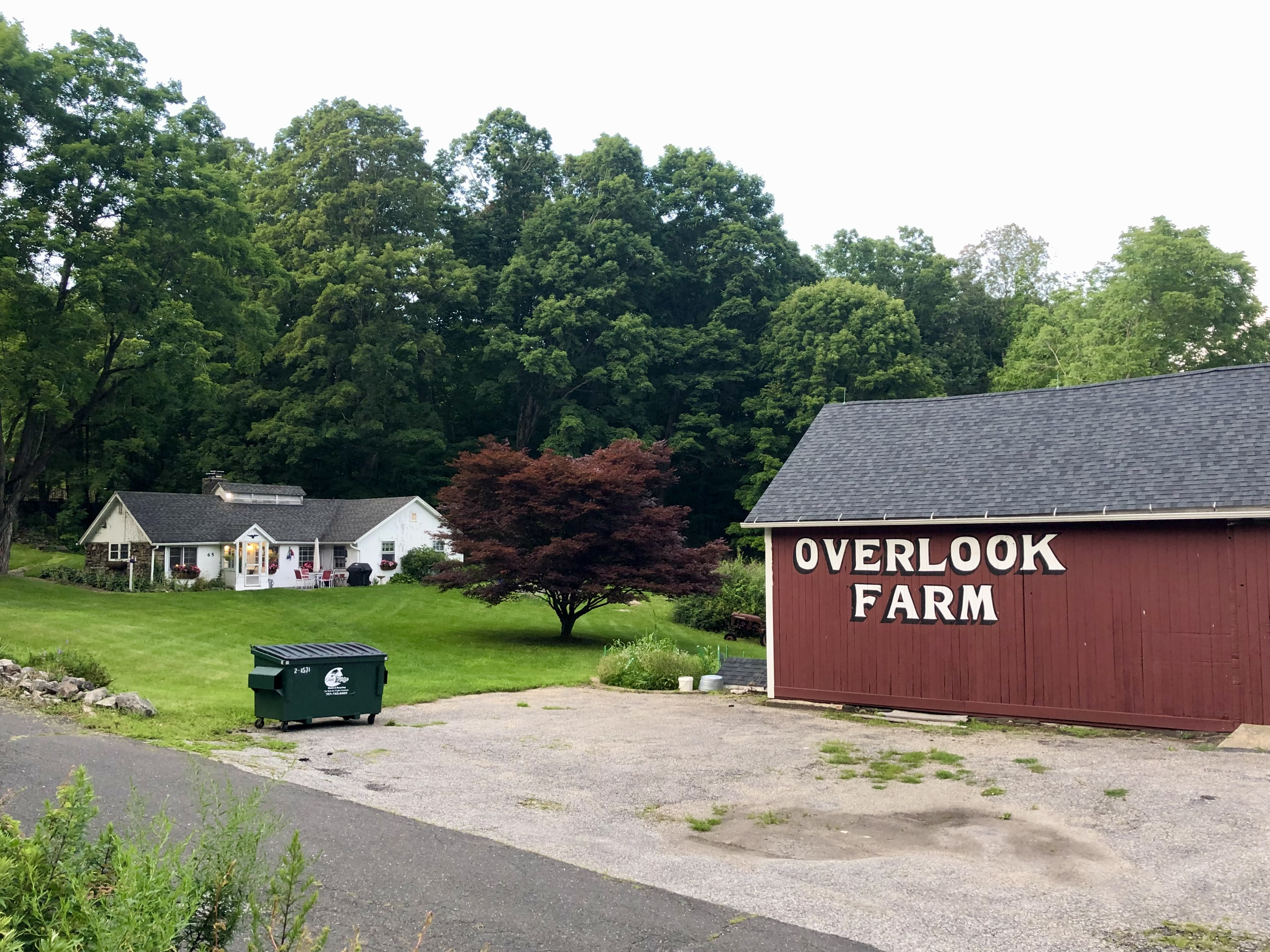
Overlook Farm on South King

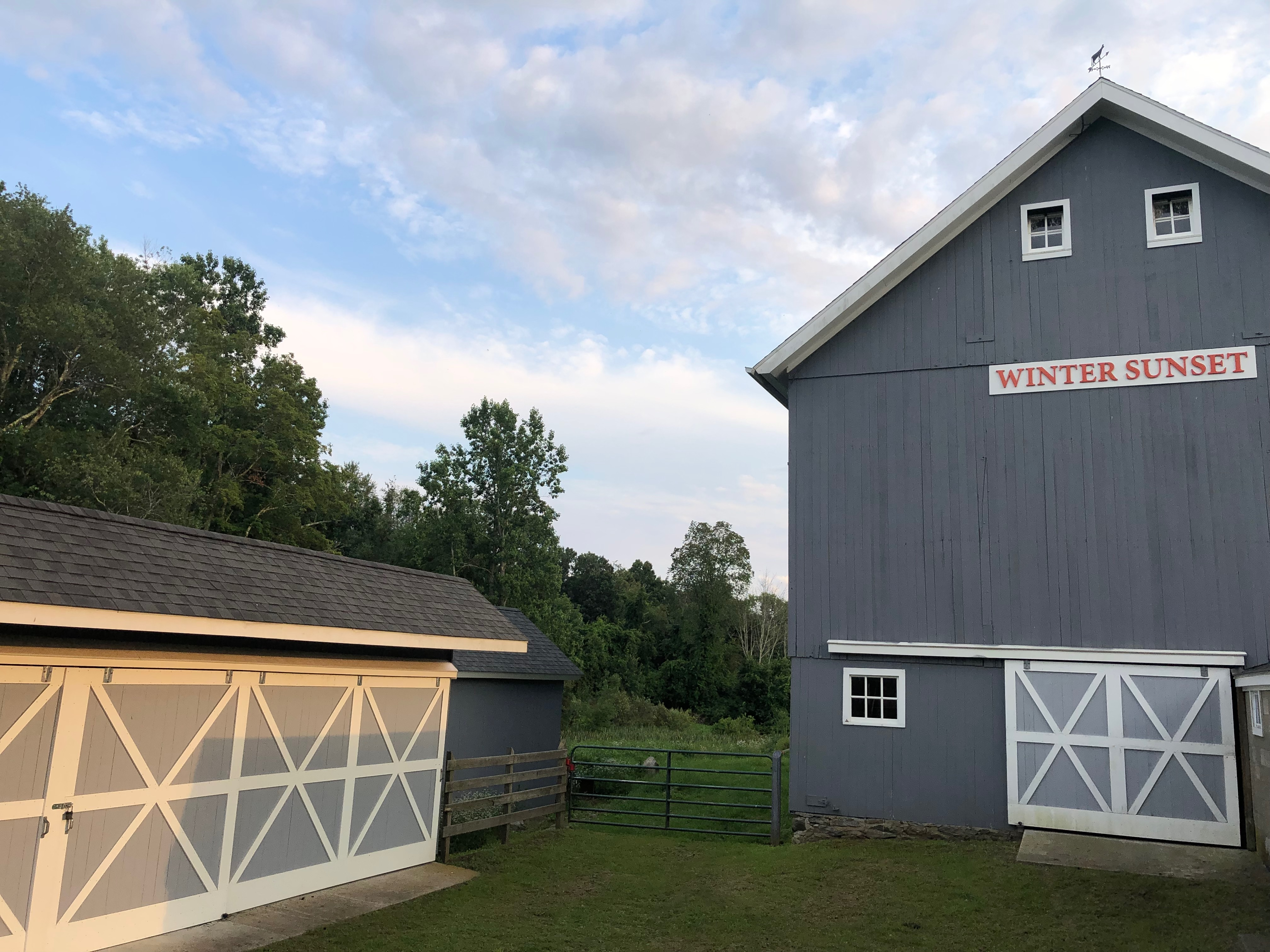
Winter Sunset Farm on West King

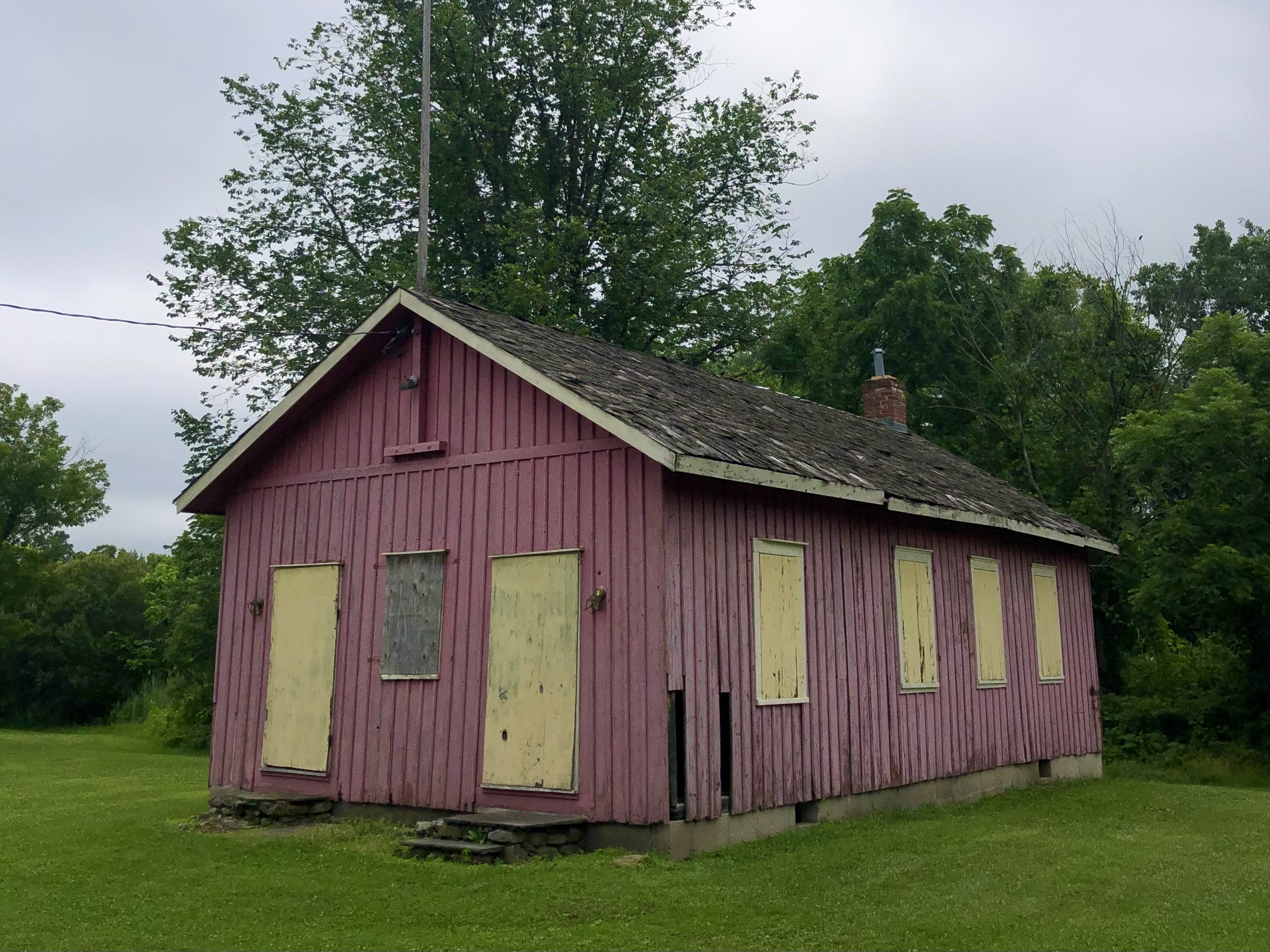
King Street District Schoolhouse

== Local community ==
At the heart of the community is the King Street Campus, at which the students in the neighborhood attend either the public primary or intermediate school. Behind the school campus is the Drska Property (often spelt Dryska), which was previously Dryska Farm, and is now a nature preserve with hiking trails that lead to Upper Kohanza Lake.

The community is served by King Street Volunteer Fire Department, since 1951.

== Notable people ==
- Rose Wilder Lane - American writer and daughter of Laura Ingalls Wilder
- Laura Nyro - American singer/songwriter
- Christian Siriano - American fashion designer and winner of Project Runway Season 4
- Don Morrow - American game show host and voice actor
- Peter Buck - American physicist, philanthropist, and co-founder of Subway
