= Charles Ives House =

Historic house in Connecticut, United States

- U.S. National Register of Historic Places
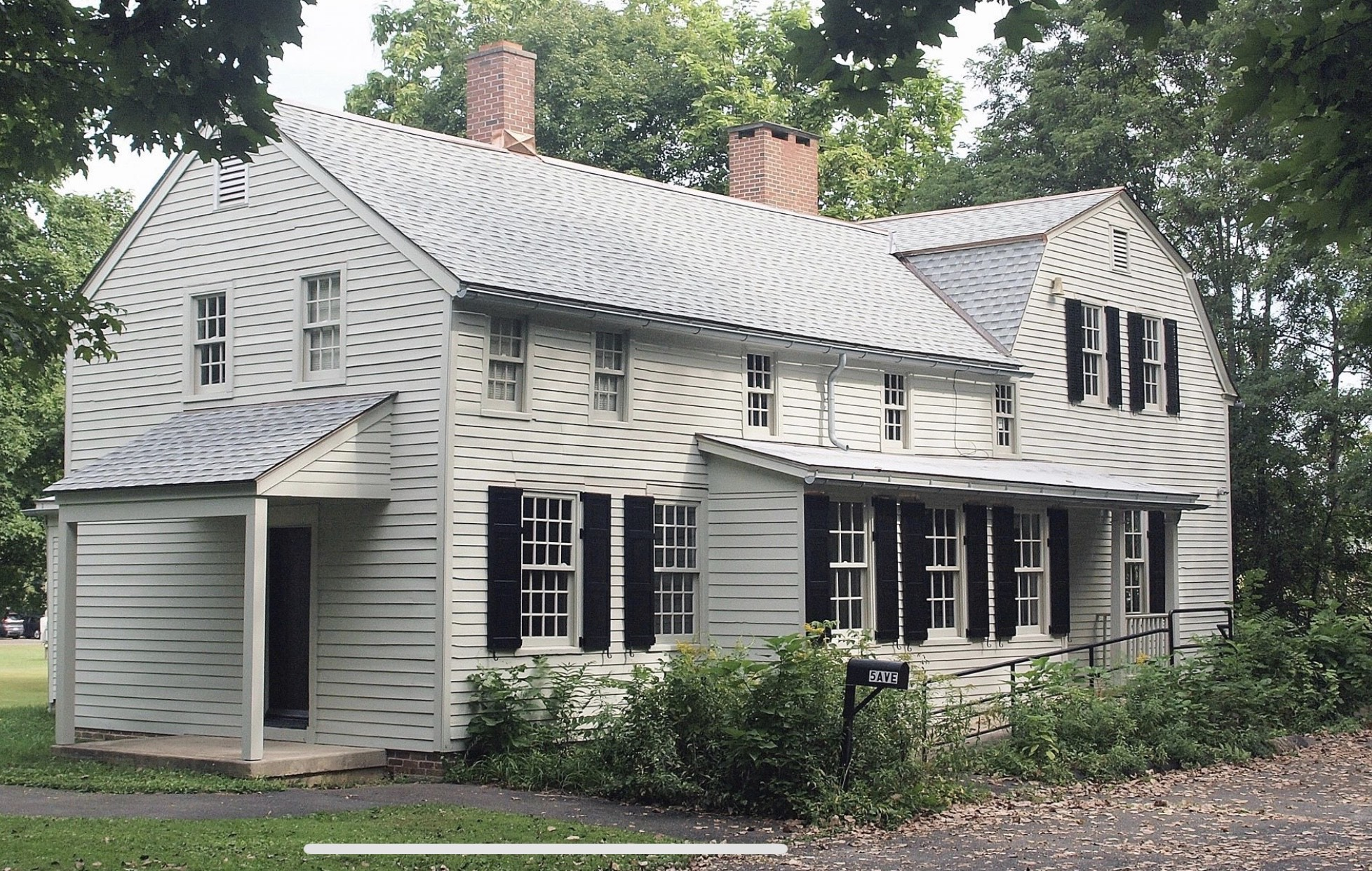
- East profile and south (rear) elevation, 2008

- Location within Connecticut Location within the United States
- Location: 7 Mountainville Road, Danbury, CT
- Coordinates: 41°22′53″N 73°26′41″W
- Area: 7 acres (2.8 ha)
- Built: 1780
- NRHP reference No.: 76001968
- Added to NRHP: April 26, 1976

The Charles Ives House, also known as Charles Ives Birthplace, is located on Mountainville Avenue in Danbury, Connecticut, United States. It is a wooden frame structure built in 1780 and expanded on since. Over the course of the 19th century, it was the residence of several generations of Iveses, a family important in the city's history. In 1874, it was the birthplace of Charles Ives, who became an internationally recognized composer in the early 20th century.

It was originally on Main Street, but was moved twice when two local banks needed to expand. The second move took it to near the current location, west of Rogers Park. It was moved a third time to allow for the construction of a nearby school. It was listed on the National Register of Historic Places in 1976. Today it is operated by the Danbury Museum and Historical Society.

== Building ==
The house is located on a seven-acre (3 ha) parcel on the east side of Mountainville Road just south of where Southern Boulevard splits off and Mountainville Avenue becomes Mountainville Road. It is south of Rogers Park and west of Rogers Park Junior High School. A small pond separates those two buildings. To the north the land is generally level and open, with single-family homes on the streets giving way to baseball diamonds in the park. South of the house the land rises to a hill and becomes wooded, with larger houses.

A driveway comes into the south side of the house, and large mature trees shelter its north. The building itself is a one-and-a-half-story wood frame structure on a brick foundation sided in clapboard with beaded corner boards in two sections. Two brick chimneys pierce the roof of the western wing.

The main section has a gambrel roof, with slightly overhanging eaves and raked cornice on its eastern side. The east (front) entrance is located in a gabled portico with its roof supported by two square fluted columns with similar capitals. Two Corinthinan pilasters join it to the house. Its closed pediment has a half-round molded dentil course. Three dormer windows with semicircular fanlights pierce the roof's lower slant at the front.

A western wing projects from the main block at that side. Connecting it and the main block on the north side is a small porch with square fluted columns similar to those on the front. Its southern roof pitch is greater than that on the north. On that elevation is a double-windowed dormer without the fanlight. On the south side of the wing is a small one-story, three-bay addition with a wheelchair ramp. A shed-roofed porch is on the west side.

The interior has been extensively altered. The woodwork is plain Victorian. The house is floored in uniform width tongue and groove boards and the walls appear to be lath and plaster.

== History ==
The main section was built by Thomas Tucker in 1780, as the Revolutionary War was ending. At that time Danbury was a small area of houses and shops around a Congregationalist church on what is today Main Street. Tucker ran a private school out of the house as well.

In 1828, Isaac Ives bought the house. He was in his 80s at the time, and it would become identified with the family primarily due to his son George White Ives. At informal gatherings in the house, the younger Ives would help found the Danbury and Norwalk Railroad, still in use today as the Danbury Branch of Metro-North's New Haven Line, and the Savings Bank of Danbury, one of the earliest local banks.

Other Ives descendants sat on the board of what became the Danbury Fair and Danbury Hospital. George Edward Ives fought in the Civil War with the 1st Connecticut Heavy Artillery during the Overland Campaign. Lyman Brewster, who married into the family, met in the house with Woodrow Wilson while drafting the Negotiable Instruments Act. The Iveses also developed side streets off Main, one of which is now named for the family, as the settlement grew into a city by the end of the century. They also added the wing on the house and redecorated its interior in accordance with the taste of the times.

Charles Ives was born in the house in 1874, while it was still located at 210 Main Street. While he was still in early childhood his family moved to Stevens Street, but they came back for frequent family occasions, which often included playing classical music on the piano. Even after he went to Yale University and lived in places other than Danbury for the rest of his life, he often returned to the family home. In 1924 the front dormers were added, the year the Iveses moved the house to Chapel Place, just behind the first site, so the Danbury National Bank could expand. Charles and his brother also felt that, in a neighborhood that was by then heavily commercial, it had lost the aura that had helped inspire his music.

Ives still visited the house frequently over the rest of his life, even after he gave up composing and moved to nearby West Redding, where he died in 1954. It is the only extant former residence of his that is connected to his musical career, since the two houses where he lived in Hartsdale, New York, during most of his productive years are no longer in existence. After his death his sister-in-law remained in the house until her death in 1964.

Three years later, in 1967, another bank, Fairfield County Trust, wanted to expand its parking lot adjacent to the house. The bank conveyed the house to the Danbury Historical Society, which bought a 14-acre (5.7 ha) site south of Rogers Park and moved it to Memorial Drive. It was moved for the last time in 1971, four years later, when the local school district wanted to build Rogers Park Junior High School. To facilitate this move, the schools leased the eastern seven acres from the museum for 99 years with an option to renew. The Danbury Museum & Historical Society Authority is fundraising to rehabilitate the house and open it as a museum. Phase I (restoration of the exterior) was completed in 2016. Phase II, the rehabilitation of the interior, was completed in 2021. The building is now open via appointment for tours year-round.

== See also ==
- National Register of Historic Places listings in Fairfield County, Connecticut
