= Dykeman =

Dykeman is a historic Dutch surname. It may also apply to:

- Dykeman Point, a point on southwest Alexander Island, Antarctica
- Dykeman Waldron Baily, a businessman and author
- Dykeman's Spring, a historic fish farm located at Shippensburg in Cumberland County, Pennsylvania
- Dykeman's station, a former station on the Harlem Line of the New York Central Railroad
- Dykemans, New York, a historic neighborhood in the town of Southeast

== See also ==
- Dyckman (disambiguation)
- Dykman
