= Towner's station =

Former station of the New York Central Railroad

Towner's
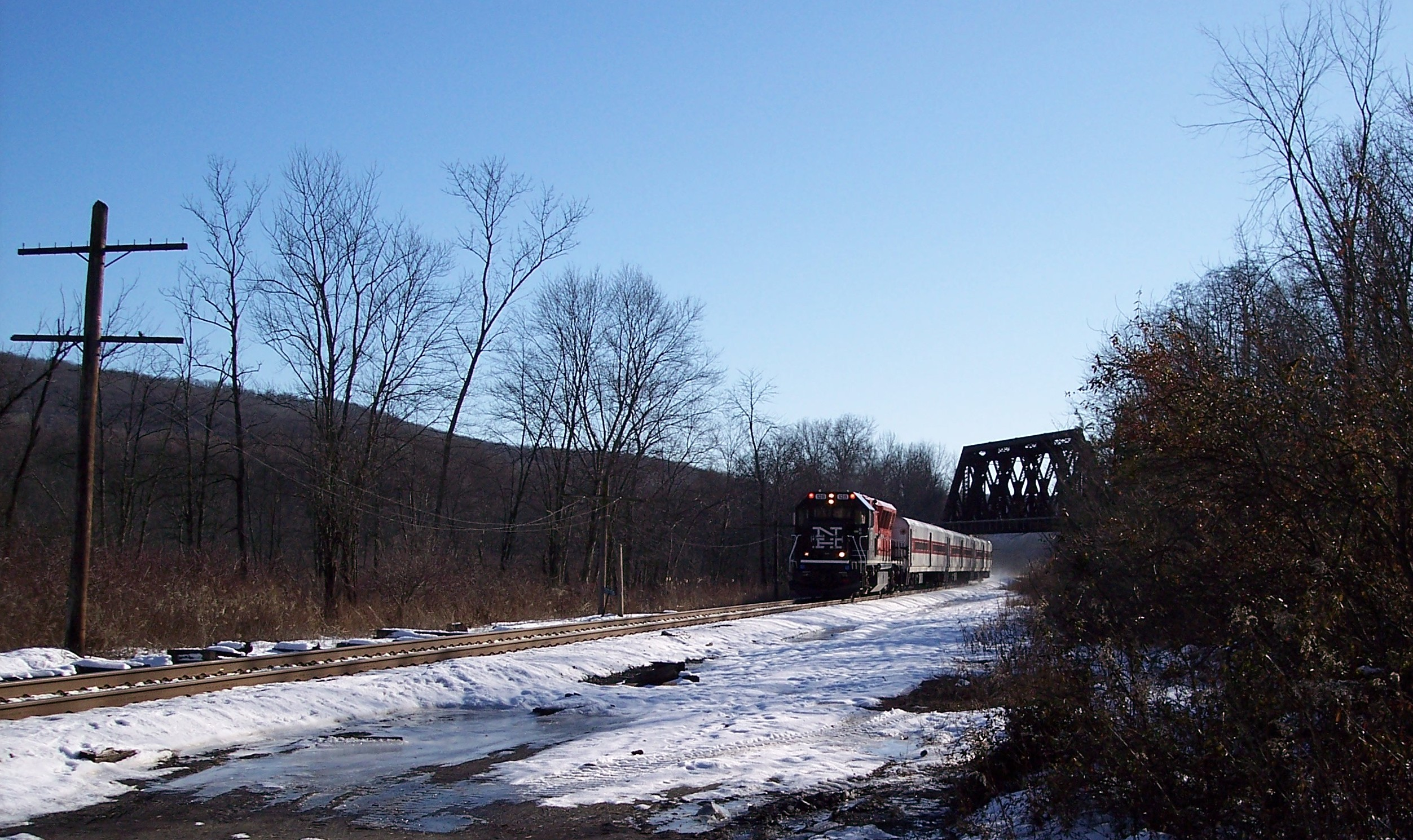
- Location of the former Towners station. Note the Maybrook-Beacon Line truss bridge in the background.

General information
- Location: New York State Route 164; Patterson, New York
- Coordinates: 41.4794°N 73.6102°W
- Tracks: 1

History
- Opened: December 31, 1848
- Closed: 1968

Key dates
- January 1958: Station agent eliminated

Former services
Preceding station	New York Central Railroad	Following station
Dykeman's toward New York	Harlem Division	Patterson toward Chatham
Location

Towner's was a station on the Harlem Line of the New York Central Railroad (now Metro-North Railroad). It was 58 miles from Grand Central Terminal. The station dates as far back as December 31, 1848 and was closed when the New York Central merged into Penn Central in 1968. No station structures remain at the site.

Towners Station was located off New York State Route 164 just north of a bridge that carries the former New York and New England Railroad main line (now the Metro-North Beacon Line) over the tracks. The Beacon Line had a separate station nearby.

== Bibliography ==
- Dana, William B. (1866). The Merchants' Magazine and Commercial Review, Volume 55. New York, New York: William B. Dana.
