= Dykman =

Dykman (Hebrew: דיקמן) is a surname. Notable people with the surname include:

- Charles P. Dykman, American judge
- Janet Dykman (born 1954), American archer
- Shlomo Dykman (1917–1965), Polish-Israeli translator and classical scholar

== See also ==
- Dyckman (disambiguation)
- Dykeman (disambiguation)
