= Church of St. Peter (Danbury, Connecticut) =

Coordinates: 41°23′31.34″N 73°26′57.06″W

St. Peter Church
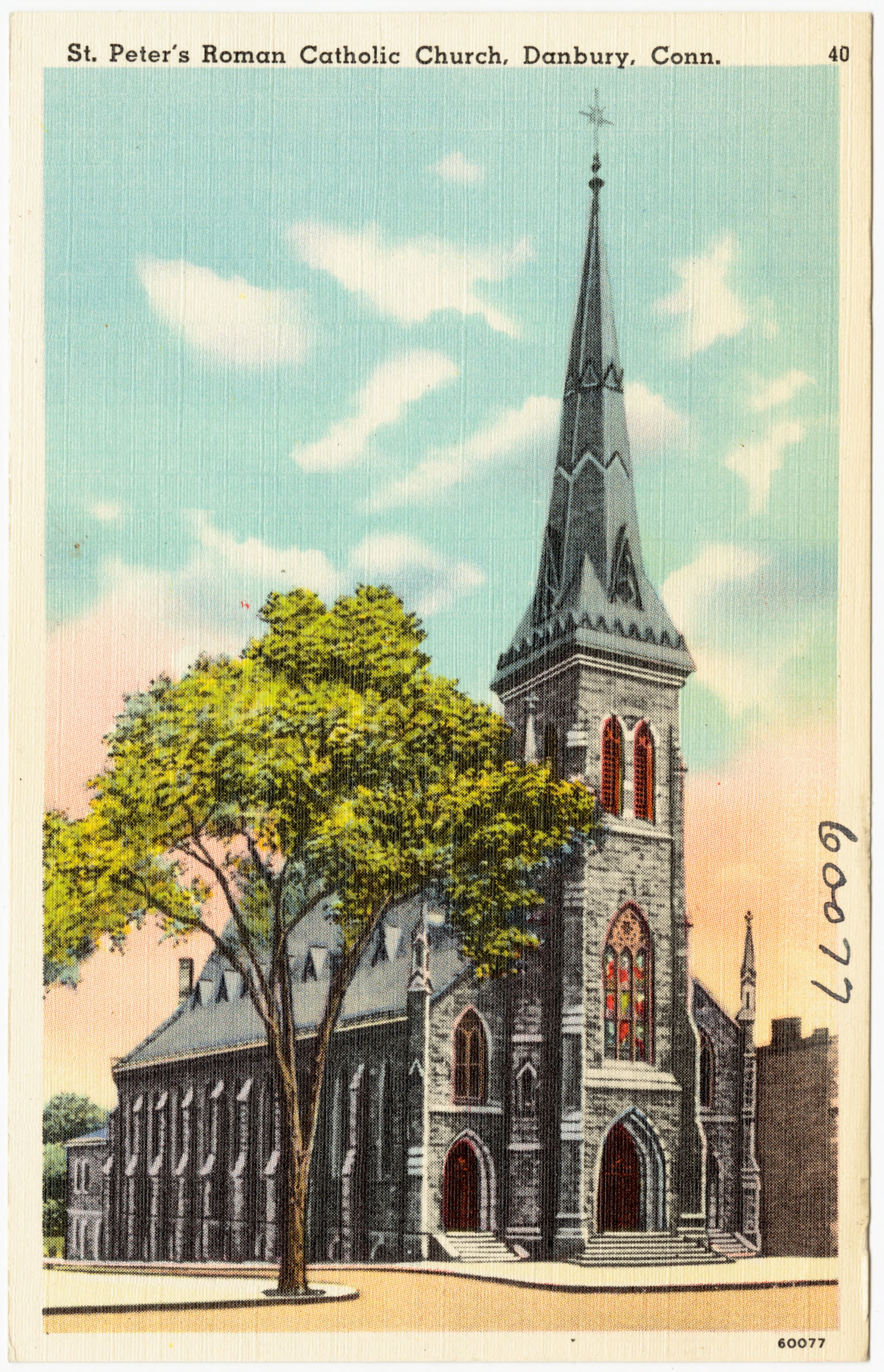
- St. Peter's Roman Catholic Church, Danbury
- St. Peter Church
- Location: 104 Main Street; Danbury, Connecticut
- Country: United States
- Denomination: Roman Catholic

Architecture
- Architect: Keely and Murphy

Administration
- Province: Hartford
- Diocese: Bridgeport

Clergy
- Bishop: Most Rev. Frank Caggiano

St. Peter is a Roman Catholic church in Danbury, Connecticut, part of the Diocese of Bridgeport. St. Peter's was the first Catholic church built in northern Fairfield County. It is the third oldest parish, and the fifth oldest Roman Catholic Church in the Diocese of Bridgeport. St. Peter's was originally a predominantly Irish congregation. Danbury's Annual St. Patrick's Day Parade steps off in front of St. Peter's. In more recent time, the parish has a significant number of parishioners of Latino and Brazilian heritage.

== History ==
The Parish of St. Peter is the third oldest parish in the Bridgeport diocese, founded in 1851. The first recorded Catholic service conducted in Danbury occurred in 1845, when Rev. Michael Lynch, of St. James in Bridgeport said Mass in the home of James Doyle of Grassy Plains. Lynch then attended Danbury on a quarterly basis. For a time, services were held in various locations: the home of James Croal on Deer Hill, the Union Hall on Main Street, and Erwins's academy.

In 1851, Rev. Thomas Ryan secured the use of the Courthouse for a brief period prior to purchasing the former Universalist church building at Main and Wooster. The sale was handled discreetly so as not to arouse the opposition of the local Know Nothings. Ryan was succeeded as pastor by Rev. Michael O'Farrell, who arranged the purchase of the cemetery. Rev. Thomas Drea was pastor in 1858 and had responsibility for missions in Brookfield, New Fairfield, Newtown, Redding Ridge, and Ridgefield. In 1860, Rev. Ambrose Manahan D.D. purchased the Congregationalist Church and had it renovated for use. He was succeeded by Father Sheridan after whom a street in Danbury is named. It was Sheridan who commenced the building of St. Peter's Church.

The cornerstone of St. Peter's Church was laid on August 28, 1870, by Bishop Francis Patrick McFarland of Hartford. Work was interrupted by the Panic of 1873, but resumed the following year under Rev. John Quinn. The Gothic Revival building was dedicated in January 1876. In December 1886, Rev. Henry J. Lynch became Rector. Henry Lynch purchased the land for the second St. Peter's cemetery. The church was completed with the addition of the spire. A chime of bells was donated by the ladies of the parish. St. Peter's is the fifth oldest Roman Catholic Church in the Diocese of Bridgeport.

As the first Catholic church built in northern Fairfield County, St. Peter's drew parishioners from the surrounding towns, many of whom walked a considerable distance to Sunday Mass, at a time when the Eucharistic fast began at midnight. In 1896 a parish library was created on the third floor of the convent through a generous donation by Mrs. J.H. Benedict. The Temperance Society Band became St. Peter's Band and played summer concerts in Elmwood Park.

== Architecture ==
The church was designed by the firm of Keely and Murphy. James Murphy would later design the first St. Mary Church in nearby Bethel, Connecticut. There are three entrances in the façade set into polychrome Gothic porches. Above each entrance are stained glass windows in Gothic arches. The church's stained glass was produced in Munich, Germany, supplied by the Royal Bavarian Art Institute and the F. X. Zettler Company.

The 1870 church and its associated buildings are significant contributing properties of the Main Street Historic District (Danbury, Connecticut) of the U.S. National Register of Historic Places and is the Mother Church for the Roman Catholic communities of Danbury, Bethel, Redding, Ridgefield and Georgetown.

== Present day ==
In 1900, the congregation of 6,000 was predominately Irish, with Germans, Italians, Hungarians, French, Poles, and Slavs. Danbury's annual St. Patrick's Day Parade steps off at St. Peter's Church. In recent years the parish has welcomed a number of Brazilian and Latino Catholics who have settled in Danbury. There is a Mass offered in Spanish on Sunday evenings, and one in Portuguese on both Saturday and Sunday.

== School ==
A school was opened in 1885, during the tenure of pastor Thomas L. Lynch. Originally run by the Sisters of Mercy, the school is now staffed by lay teachers. A preschool program for three and four year olds was added in 1982. St. Peter School serves children in grades Pre-K through Grade 8.
