= Dyckman =

Dyckman may refer to:

- Dyckman House, the oldest remaining farmhouse in Manhattan
- Dyckman Street, a street in the Inwood neighborhood of Manhattan, New York City
- Emory F. Dyckman (1877–1930), American lawyer and politician
- States Dyckman, a wealthy British Loyalist in the American Revolution

== See also ==
- Dykeman (disambiguation)
- Dykman, a surname
