= Main Street Historic District (Danbury, Connecticut) =

Historic district in Connecticut, United States

- U.S. National Register of Historic Places
- U.S. Historic district
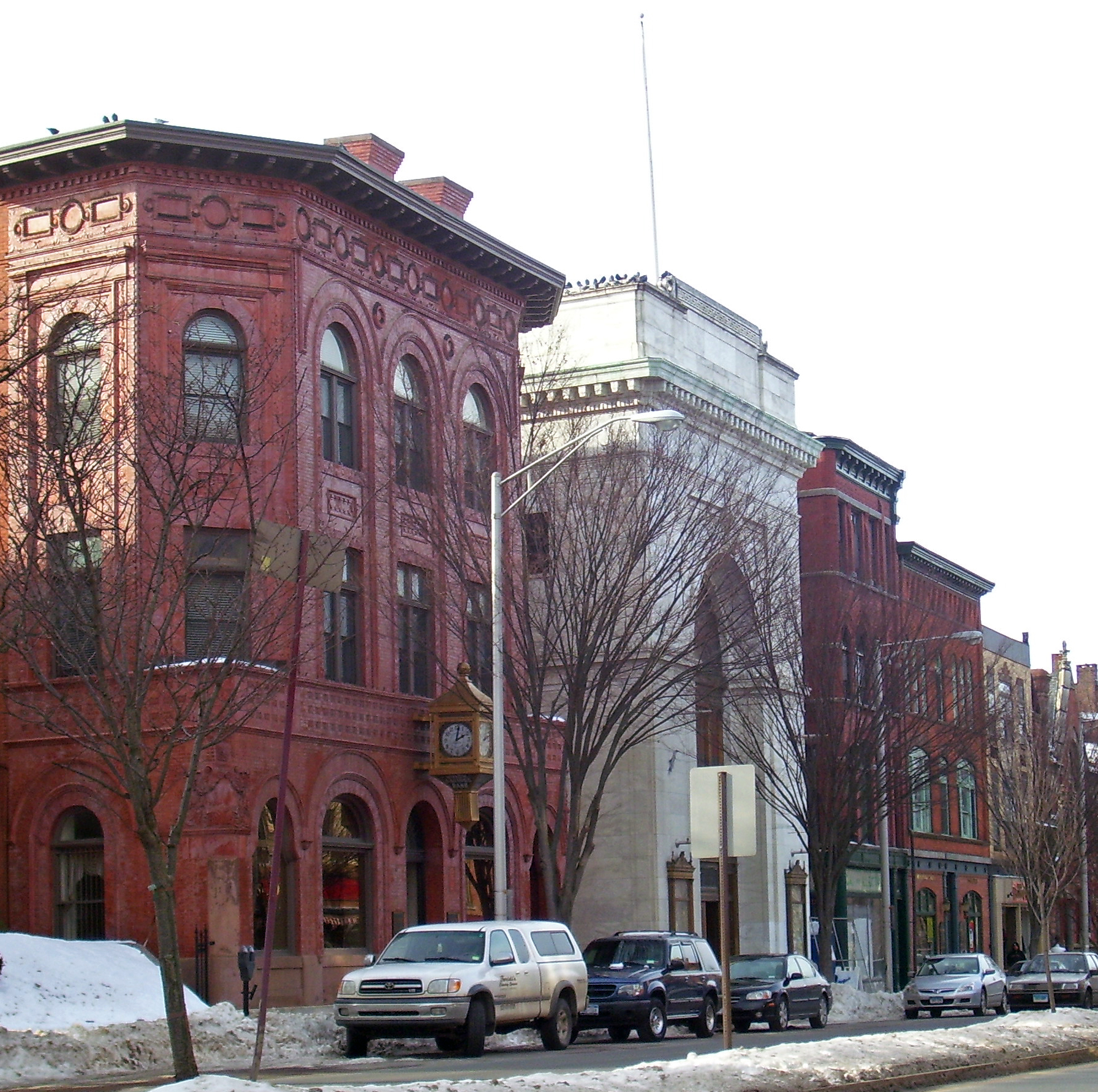
- Main Street in 2007

- Location within Connecticut Location within the United States
- Location: Danbury, CT
- Coordinates: 41°23′41″N 73°27′10″W
- Area: 47 acres (19 ha).
- Built: 1785–1931
- Architect: multiple
- Architectural style: multiple, primarily Italianate and Romanesque
- NRHP reference No.: 83003508
- Added to NRHP: November 29, 1983

The Main Street Historic District in Danbury, Connecticut, United States, is the oldest section of that city, at its geographical center. It has long been the city's commercial core and downtown. Its 132 buildings, 97 of which are considered contributing properties, include government buildings, churches, commercial establishments and residences, all in a variety of architectural styles from the late 18th century to the early 20th. It is the only major industrial downtown of its size in Connecticut not to have developed around either port facilities or a water power site.

It was called Town Street when Danbury was first settled in the late 17th century. For over a century afterwards the "long, straggling street" was synonymous with Danbury, to the point that farmers in the area referred to it as Danbury Street. The Revolutionary War in that area of Connecticut began in the future district, where a marker indicates the first shot fired at the British. As the city began growing toward the mid-19th century, its development was shaped by the arrival of the railroads, which helped the city's hatmakers dominate their industry.

In the mid-20th century the area began to decline. Hats became less popular after World War II, causing the hat factories to close. The floods of 1955 took a toll, with some businesses choosing not to rebuild. Other businesses left later for a new shopping mall elsewhere in the city. Main Street was largely spared the demolition that accompanied urban renewal elsewhere in the country, and it was recognized as the city's only historic district and listed on the National Register of Historic Places in 1983. Its contributing properties, ranging from the 1780s to the 1930s, reflects a diversity of uses and styles with a heavy concentration of the Italianate commercial architecture of the late 19th century.

Today, downtown Danbury is once again thriving due to a variety of factors. Businesses formed a special taxing district to raise money for infrastructure maintenance and improvement, and the city used state grants to build popular attractions near downtown like a rail museum and ice arena. Danbury's population has also increased in the late 20th century as it became a popular exurban enclave for New York metropolitan area commuters, and Latin American immigrants have settled in and established businesses along Main Street despite tensions with the city's mayor.

== Geography ==
The district follows a three-quarter–mile (1.21 km) section of Main Street (state highway CT 53) from 34 and 43 Main (the John Rider House, now the city's historical museum) at the south end to White Street at the north. At both ends there are distinct changes—a shift to more modern construction at the south end and the flood control measures along the Still River at the north—that distinguish the district from adjacent areas. Portions of nine side streets are included, varying from most of the adjacent blocks of Elm, Keeler, West and White streets and Library Place to single properties on Boughton Street and Post Office Place. The entire Wooster Street Cemetery is within the district as well. At the northeast corner, Ives Street is also included to Delay Place and Railroad Street. The geographic center of Danbury is close to 238 Main Street. The terrain slopes slightly from south to north along the Still's flood plain, but appears level.

To the north Main Street continues to be predominantly commercial, all the way to Interstate 84 (also, at that point, US 6/7/202) a mile (1.6 km) north. Large-scale residential development mixes with the commercial development south of the district, to where Route 53 leaves to follow South Street towards Bethel. East downtown continues a few blocks to the railroad tracks and the train station), with a small residential neighborhood intervening between downtown and Western Connecticut State University. Residential neighborhoods are to the west.

The district is a heavily developed urban core with mostly commercial buildings, predominantly two-story structures fronting on Main Street, some mixed use with apartments on the upper stories. Among them are some government buildings such as the post office and courthouse and churches such as St. Peter's, whose 175-foot (53 m) spire dominates the city's skyline. Single- and multiple-unit residential properties are generally on the side streets. In addition to the parking lots, there is some open space, most significantly Elmwood Park, in the center of from roughly north of Park Place to south of Center Street. From there to the district's north end it continues as a narrow planted median strip.

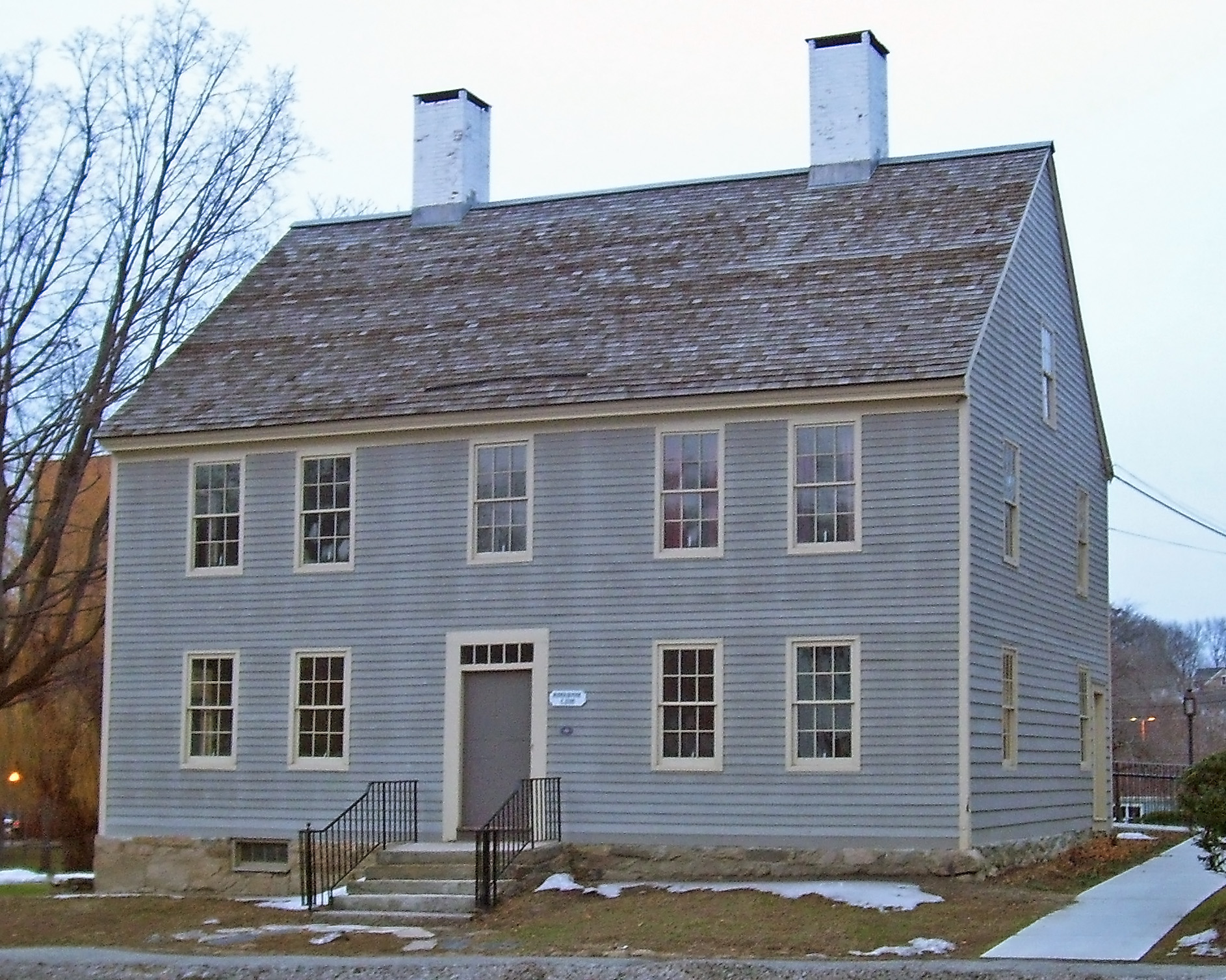
John Rider House, ca. 1785

Within the district's 47-acre (19 ha) area are 132 properties, 97 of which are contributing to the district's historic character. One, the John Rider House, currently used as a local historical museum, is also listed on the Register individually. The architectural styles represented run from the Georgian houses contemporary with the Riders near the south end of the district, its oldest area, to Colonial Revival and Modernist buildings near its north end, reflecting the business district's expansion in that direction over the course of that time. There are also several historical monuments considered contributing.

== History ==
For the first century and a half of its existence, Danbury and Main Street were one and the same. The arrival of the railroads in the mid-19th century and the growth of the city's hatmaking industry began to expand it beyond Main's immediate neighborhood, and by the end of the century what had been a small village was a city with Main Street as its civic and commercial core.

Another mode of transportation, the automobile, began having an adverse effect on Main Street in the 20th century, routing traffic away from it and making outlying areas more commercially viable and accessible. Revitalization measures by the city have offset this effect somewhat, as has the area's attractiveness to immigrants from Latin America.

=== 1684–1800: Settlement ===
Danbury began with Main Street. The first eight families who moved up from Norwalk to start an agricultural community on the frontier in 1684 called it Town Street. Their success led to the subsequent establishment of smaller communities like New Milford, Newtown and Ridgefield on the periphery of the new community. Danbury's location at the junction of the main north–south route up the Housatonic valley and the east–west route coming into Connecticut from New York's Hudson Valley to the west helped it prosper further. For these early settlers, the center of community life was the Congregationalist church they built on what is now the site of the Wooster Street cemetery.

Most of the early buildings were destroyed in a British raid during 1777. During the Revolutionary War Danbury was a supply depot for the Continental Army due to its location. An army hospital was also established, and local artificers manufactured nails, wagons, shoes and harnesses for military use.

Shortly after independence, in 1784, Danbury was designated a half-shire town, essentially sharing county seat functions with Fairfield. The Congregationalist church that had been the village's first center moved north a few blocks to the West Street corner in 1785, spurring some development there as it remained the center of community life. In 1792, the first courthouse and jail were built on the sites occupied by the modern buildings today.

=== 1801–1851: Early industrialization ===
Postwar rebuilding led to the establishment of the industries that made Danbury prosperous for over a century. Hatmaking had existed there even before the Revolution, but in the decades afterwards the village led the country in the field. By 1800 its hatters were producing 20,000 annually. They established retail outlets in the Southern states, and were followed by local makers of boots, shoes, saddles and horn combs. Some buildings from this period remain, such as the 1790 John Dodd shop now on the Rider House museum property, the oldest extant commercial building in the city.

In 1801 the land that is now Elmwood Park was donated to the village for use as a town common. It would be used as a drilling area for the local militia and the early fairs of the Fairfield County Agricultural Society, which later became Danbury Fair. Today's side streets had existed since the late 18th century, but Danbury during this period was still seen by outsiders as "...built principally upon one street, which for more than a mile exhibits an almost continued range of buildings, consisting of dwelling houses, mercantile stores, hat factories, mechanic shops and churches." Farmers who came into town referred to it as Danbury Street.

In 1822, the state granted borough status to Main Street and the area around it. That allowed it to form fire companies and develop a water supply system. Growth continued, and a branch of the Fairfield County Bank was opened in 1826. Two years later a new jail was built on the same site as the current former jail building. In 1829 the last parcel belonging to the Congregational church, a large lot on the west side of the common, was sold and subdivided to pay a departing minister. Large double houses, such as 101–103 and 105–107 Main, were built on the land in the following decade. A Universalist church was built on the common in 1833. The Fry & Gregory saddle factory, built in 1836 at 68 Main Street, is one of the extant buildings exemplifying commercial activity during this period.

The first local bank, the Savings Bank of Danbury, was established by local businessmen in the home of treasurer George Ives, grandfather of composer Charles Ives, on Main Street. Soon after, downtown would reach its modern extent in 1852 with the coming of the Danbury and Norwalk Railroad. The landowners of northern Main Street, also stockholders in the railroad, had its passenger depot built at the present location of the post office, helping to increase the value of their land and businesses. A promised secondary depot at the common was never built, and the northern Main Street landowners also defeated a proposal to expand the common into a "central park". The landowners and businessmen of southern Main Street spent their own money to remake the common into Elmwood Park, planting it with elm trees and a hay crop.

=== 1851–1945: Industrial peak ===
The railroads brought significant change to downtown. During the 1850s the first multi-story brick commercial blocks were erected downtown, starting with Phineas Crosby's Block at 225–229 Main Street. In 1852 it was followed by the Benedict and Nichols Building at 191–193 Main. Its cofounder David Nichols had already built the borough's first grocery 1838, and later served as a state legislator and state treasurer. Large steam-powered hat factories were built, bringing new workers to Danbury. In addition to internal migrants from the rural towns in the area, they were English, Irish and German immigrants. The combined town and borough population nearly doubled between 1850 and 1860, even though Bethel became a separate town during that time. In 1851 the Irish immigrants bought the Universalist Church on the common for their growing St. Peter's church; moving to a newer structure when it was consecrated in 1876.

As a result, Main Street became more commercial. The hatters were skilled workers who could afford to buy or even build their own homes rather than live in crowded tenements, and found the side streets to the west ideal for this purpose. To the east of Main commercial development continued, with the hat factories concentrated in the north, near the river. Wooster Square, the intersection of Main, Elm and White, became a focal point of northern downtown due to the train station's presence. Lumberyards and frame stores opened along White. In 1856 Isaac Ives, Charles's uncle, opened the street that bears the family name.

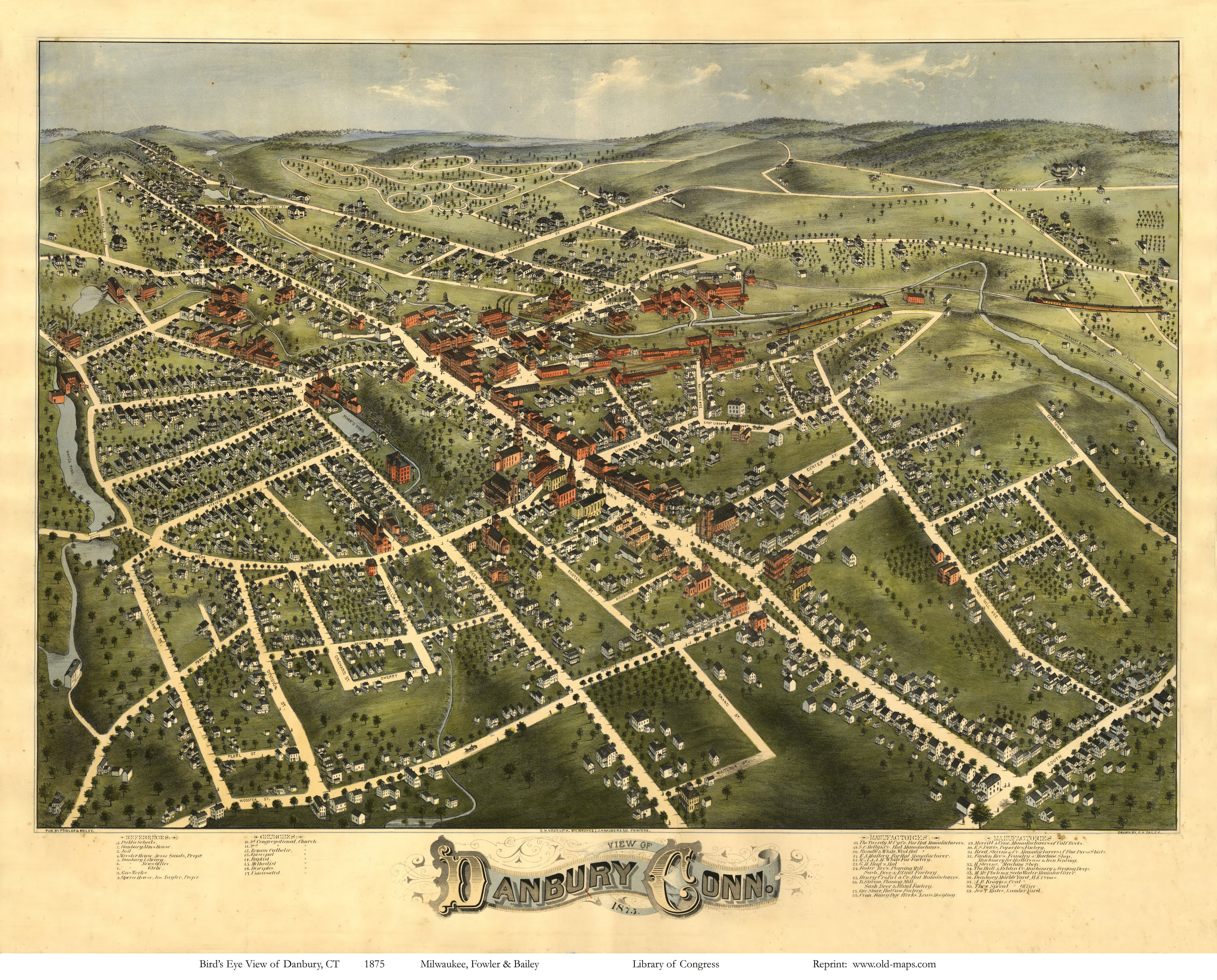
1875 picture map of Danbury

After the Civil War, another new bank, Union Savings, was founded by hatmakers and merchants. In the 1870s more new public buildings were erected. In 1873, the current jail building replaced the one built in 1828, by then inadequate, and a High Victorian Gothic library was donated to the borough five years later by Alexander White, one of the leading hat industry executives. That same year, the new Danbury News building went up at 288 Main Street, home to editor James Montgomery Bailey, whose humorous pieces as "The Danbury News Man" brought him national renown. A Soldier's Monument commemorating the local war dead was built at Main and West in 1880. Three years later the city built a new firehouse on Ives Street, and a new City Hall at Main and West where the library now stands.

The Main and West intersection, now called City Hall Square, became the new center of the district, finally displacing the old Congregational church site to the south. The private sector responded with architectural statements of their own. New commercial blocks began to reach three and four stories, and in 1887 the Union Savings Bank moved into its current building at 226–228 Main Street. Commercial development pushed eastward, leading Isaac Ives to open Keeler Street for development that same year.

The 1880s culminated with the borough of Danbury becoming a city, and the merger of the three railroads that had served the city (the Housatonic and New York and New England, in addition to the Danbury and Norwalk) becoming part of the New York, New Haven and Hartford Railroad, referred to locally as the Consolidated due to this absorption. These changes had a profound effect on the community. Main Street was paved with granite blocks between Elmwood Park and White Street. Flagstone sidewalks, sewers, electric arc lights and a horse railway were installed.

At the end of the 1890s Danbury's 35 hat factories led the nation in production, employing 5,000 directly and indirectly. A neon sign with a derby hat on a crown and the legend "Danbury Crowns Them All" greeted arrivals at the new train station (now the Danbury Railway Museum) just east of downtown. The city overcame opposition from Bridgeport and persuaded the county legislature to appropriate funds for the current courthouse. Downtown also became an educational center for the region, as Danbury High School was housed on the third floor of the Union Savings Bank building, joining St. Peter's School at 98 Main Street, the first parochial school in Danbury when it was built in 1885.

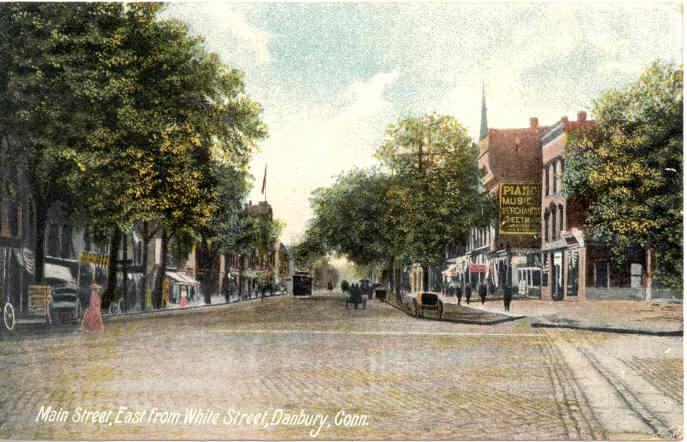
1907 postcard of Main Street from White Street

As the 20th century began the city was at its industrial peak. Newly designated U.S. highways 6, 7 and 202 followed Main, West and White streets through downtown, bringing in automobile traffic. Main Street became a local retailing center, with Woolworth's, McCrory and Sears opening department stores in the new century's early decades, drawing customers from the smaller nearby towns in Connecticut and the adjacent towns across the New York state line in Dutchess and Putnam counties. Car traffic also led to the establishment of dealerships on Main Street, primarily in the areas south of Elmwood Park. The demolition of older buildings to make way for them shaped the future historic district.

=== 1946–1995: Decline ===
Danbury's fortunes changed after World War II. Americans, particularly men, began wearing hats less frequently, forcing cutbacks or closings at the hat factories. In 1955, the flooding of the Still that followed hurricanes Connie, Diane and Ione badly damaged many businesses, particularly in the Wooster Square and White Street areas. In their wake some of the first preservation efforts began. The Dodd Shop was saved from demolition by a move to its current location in 1958, and the Blackman House at 59 Main Street was converted into office space.

The next year, 1959, the city and town of Danbury were merged as the state eliminated most county government functions. Downtown merchants who had been affected by the flood reacted by moving to newer and larger space on routes 6,7, 37 and 202 outside of the city center. The empty, damaged space they left behind on the north and northwest of downtown was addressed by urban renewal programs of the late 1960s and early 1970s, which demolished whole blocks, partly to accommodate the rechanneling of the Still for flood control.

In the 1970s the completion of Interstate 84 dealt Main Street another setback. All three of Danbury's U.S. highways were rerouted onto the expressway as well and away from downtown. In combination with the expressway bypasses built for US 7 both north and south of the city, this made the outlying properties businesses had been moving to more accessible and competitive with downtown locations. Remaining business owners responded by renovating and restoring their own properties, and the scope of preservation efforts began to expand from the old houses on the south end.

The Danbury Preservation Trust, which had been formed in the late 1950s, received a state grant in 1979 to survey and inventory the historic buildings on Main and the nearby side streets. Eventually the effort looked at 300 buildings before settling on the area that would become today's historic district. It was designated and added to the National Register of Historic Places in 1983, after an intensive survey of the area by the Danbury Preservation Trust as part of an effort by the Connecticut Historical Commission to catalog the state's historic resources for inclusion on the Register. The city has special zoning regulations to maintain its historic character.

During the 1980s downtown faced its greatest challenge. In 1981, after the last Danbury Fair was held, Wilmorite Properties of Rochester, New York, bought the fairground and began developing it into a shopping mall. When it opened in 1986, its location near the junction of I-84 and the southern US 7 freeway made it attractive and convenient for shoppers in the region. Main Street's merchants formed a special taxing district, CityCenter Danbury, downtown. For a while both they and the mall remained prosperous, although they knew Main Street would never be the center of local retailing again. But when the economy fell into recession in the early 1990s, they feared shoppers would return to the mall and not Main Street. The 1991 closure of Steinbach's, the last department store on Main Street, seemed to affirm this fear.

With state grants, the city built a parking garage on some of the land marked for redevelopment after the flood, in order to free up other scattered parking space. It was the start of a planned complex that would include a movie theater, retail space and condominiums, all meant to attract middle class residents to the city. The city also hired a consultant to look at plans to cluster similar retailers so downtown could match the mall in offering that to shoppers as well.

=== 1996–present: Revitalization ===
By the middle of the decade these efforts had succeeded, helped in part by Danbury's transformation from industrial town to distant exurb of New York City, with corporations such as Cartus and Duracell building major facilities in the area and new housing going up in the areas on the city's periphery as commuters sought less expensive housing still within commuting distance of Manhattan. In 1996 Danbury's industrial space was 93% occupied, and office space vacancy rates were under 15%. Ives Street was reinvented as a Dining and Entertainment District, with the vacant buildings converted into restaurants and nightclubs. "We feel that the downtown is coming back strong", said one local bank president. The community rallied after arson severely damaged the library in 1996. Voters passed a bond issue to fund improvements and expansions to city hall and rebuild the library. The Danbury Ice Arena, later home to several minor league ice hockey teams, most recently the Danbury Whalers, was also built near Main Street in 1999. It offered a visitor attraction to complement the former train station which had become the Danbury Railway Museum.

As they had in the mid-19th century, immigrants helped revitalize downtown in the early 21st century. This time they were from Latin America, primarily Ecuador and Brazil, working as day labor at construction sites all over Fairfield County. Not all of them were in the U.S. legally, and this created tensions between their community and Mayor Mark Boughton, who unsuccessfully asked Governor Jodi Rell to have city police deputized as Bureau of Citizenship and Immigration Services (BCIS) agents so they could legally enforce federal immigration laws. The immigrant community was in turn angered by police efforts to close down their volleyball games and sting operations that turned some of them over to the BCIS. In 2005 they staged a mile-long march down Main Street in protest.

== Significant contributing properties ==
Some of the district's properties are architecturally or historically noteworthy in themselves. One, the John Rider House, was listed on the National Register prior to the district's creation. Another, the former jailhouse, was determined eligible for listing.

- American Legion Hall, 32–52 Elm Street. The open expanses of brick wall surface with round-arched windows on this 1927 building typify the work of local architect Philip Sunderland.
- Benedict & Nichols Building, 191-193 Main Street. When built in 1852 this transitional Greek Revival-Italianate commercial structure was the first three-story block in Danbury.
- Chiarella Block, 272 Main Street. This 1914–15 mixed-use structure is one of the earliest in the district to show signs of the Colonial Revival style.
- Commercial Building at 131 Main Street. Built in 1931, it is the youngest contributing property in the district. Its modernist design has some Art Deco elements.
- Commercial Building at 141 Main Street. The dedication plaque of this 1907 late Italianate building is inscribed in both English and Arabic.
- Commercial Building at 279–283 Main Street. First built as a Greek Revival commercial structure in 1853, later sales to different owners led to portions of the facade being redone in Tudor and modernist styles.
- Crofut Block, 253–255 Main Street. This brick 1876 building with wooden pedimented window hoods, corner quoins and pressed tin ceiling in the store interior at 255 is an excellent example of the high commercial application of the Italianate style.
- Danbury News Building, 288 Main Street. This 1873 building had a distinctive Queen Anne tower added in 1893.
- Old Danbury Library, 254 Main Street. Donated to the city in 1878 by fur-processing executive Alexander Moss White, its brick facade with polychromatic sandstone trim and slate-shingled gable roof make it the only High Victorian Gothic building extant in the Danbury area.
- John Dodd Shop, 43 Main Street, rear. Moved from its original site to preserve it, this small 1790 frame building is the oldest commercial building in the district.
- Elmwood Park, in center of Main Street between South and Wooster streets. Originally donated to town as a common, it was the last home of the Congregationalist church that was the focal point of the early village of Danbury. Later used for growing hay and turned into a public park.
- Fairfield County Courthouse, 71 Main Street. An 1899 Beaux Arts structure designed by Warren Briggs that now serves as juvenile court.
- Hornig Block, 10–16 Elm Street. This 1882 Italianate commercial building is the only one in the district with pressed-metal siding.
- Houses at 101–103 and 105–107 Main Street. Two double houses, Greek Revival and Federal in style respectively, that reflect Danbury's early industrial growth in the 1830s.
- Humane Hose Co. No. 1 Firehouse, 6 Boughton Street. The only property on Boughton is a 1911 stucco Italianate firehouse still in public use as a police garage.
- Old Fairfield County Jail, 80 Main Street. An 1872 Second Empire building used for its original purpose until 1969. Today it has been converted mostly to senior housing, with part of the ground floor set aside as a small museum. It was determined eligible for the National Register in 1980 but has not been formally listed.
- Old Fire Station, 5-7 Ives Street. When this slate-roofed brick building went up in 1883 it was one of Danbury's first major public buildings. After being taken out of service in 1969, it has been converted into apartments.
- Old Post Office, 258 Main Street. Built in 1876, this Italianate brick building has corbeled window hoods. Its original cornice is missing.
- Old Saddle Factory, 68 Main Street. An 1836 wood frame building later used as housing and today as office space.
- Old Southern New England Telephone Company Building, 31 West Street. This 1908 brick building has some Dutch Colonial Revival touches, most significantly its prominent stepped-gabled roof.
- John Rider House, 43 Main Street. This 1785 wooden house is the oldest property in the district. It is currently home to the Danbury Historical Society and Museum, and the only property in the district individually listed on the National Register.
- Seifert Armory, 5–15 Library Place. This five-story 1891 brick building with brownstone lintels and iron cornice has been remodeled into apartments.
- St. James Episcopal Church, 25 West Street. A granite Gothic Revival church completed in 1872, making it the oldest extant church building in the district. The parish hall and rectory were added in 1929.
- St. Peter's Catholic Church, 104 Main Street. The 175-foot (53 m) spire of this 1870s building dominates the Danbury skyline. It was the first Catholic church established in northern Fairfield County, later the centerpiece of a small complex of associated buildings.
- St. Peter's Convent, 88 Main Street. An 1895 Renaissance Revival three-story brick building with copper hipped roof.

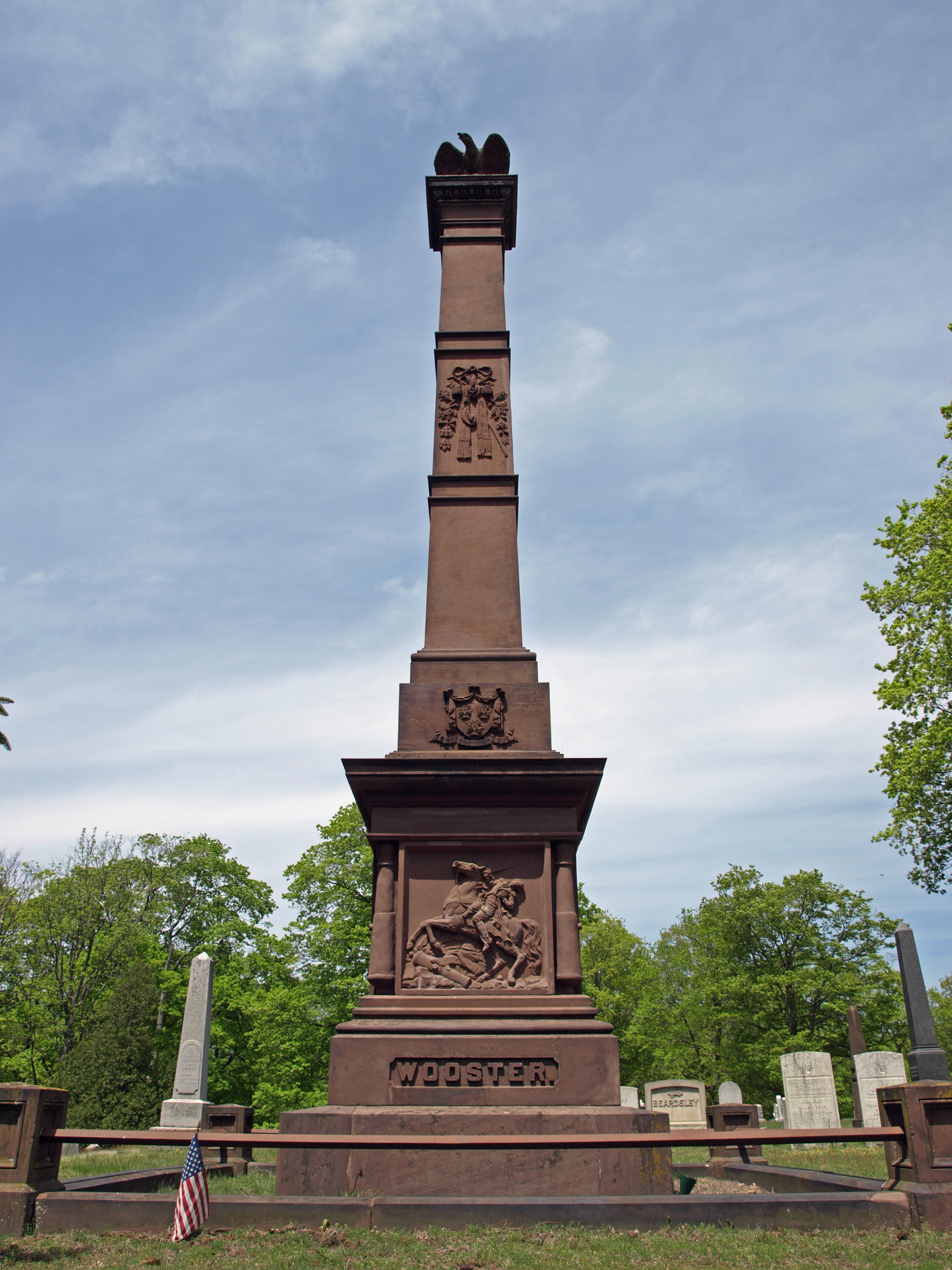
Monument to David Wooster in Wooster Cemetery

- St. Peter's Rectory, 104 Main Street. A three-story 1891 Richardsonian Romanesque brick building with two projecting octagonal towers.
- St. Peter's School, 98 Main Street. An 1895 Italianate flat-roofed brick building with bell tower. A rear extension was added in 1909.
- Sears Building, 129 Main Street. Built by the retailer in 1929, it was one of the first modernist buildings in the district.
- Thomas Settle Building, 248 Main Street. Warren Briggs designed this Richardsonian Romanesque 1887 commercial structure of rusticated brownstone for the Danbury National Bank. Its original roof and gables were removed after a 1973 fire.
- Soldiers' Monument, Main and West streets. This granite statue of a Union Army soldier atop a 12-foot (3.7 m) column with the names of Civil War battles engraved in it was erected in 1878 to memorialize local war dead.
- Union Savings Bank, 226–228 Main Street. A Louis Sullivan-inspired building in brick with terra cotta that was considered one of the city's most distinctive upon its 1887 completion.
- U.S. Post Office, 265 Main Street. Oscar Wenderoth designed this two-story brick Georgian Revival building with a limestone marble and stained oak interior.
- Wooster Cemetery, Wooster Street behind old jail building. Danbury's oldest cemetery, with some graves dating to ca. 1700.
- Wooster Square This section of the city is named after General David Wooster, who was killed defending Danbury against the British attack of 1777. It saw an initial increase in significance in the 1880s, due to its close proximity to the developing railroads and booming hatting industry. Unfortunately, many decades later, the flood of October 1955 caused severe damage to this area, leading to the loss of several notable buildings. The Danbury and Bethel Street Railway, an electric trolley service, operated between Wooster Square and Greenwood Avenue (Bethel) from 1887 until 1926.
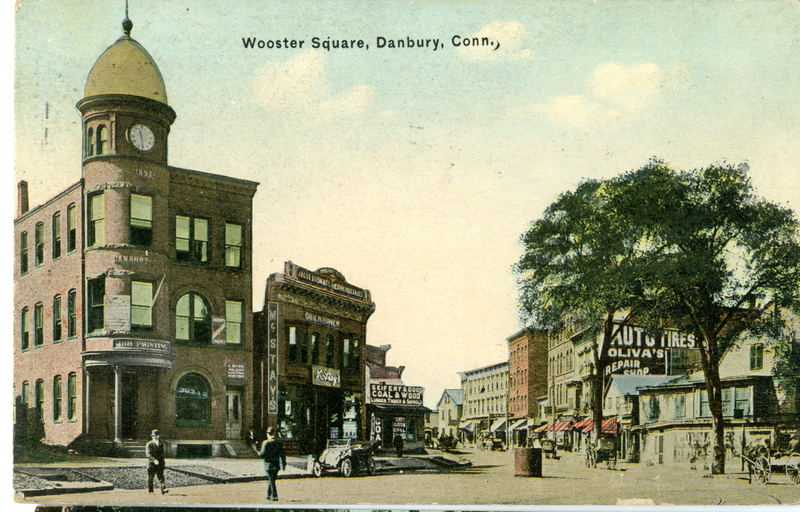
Danbury News Building in Wooster Square, from a 1915 postcard

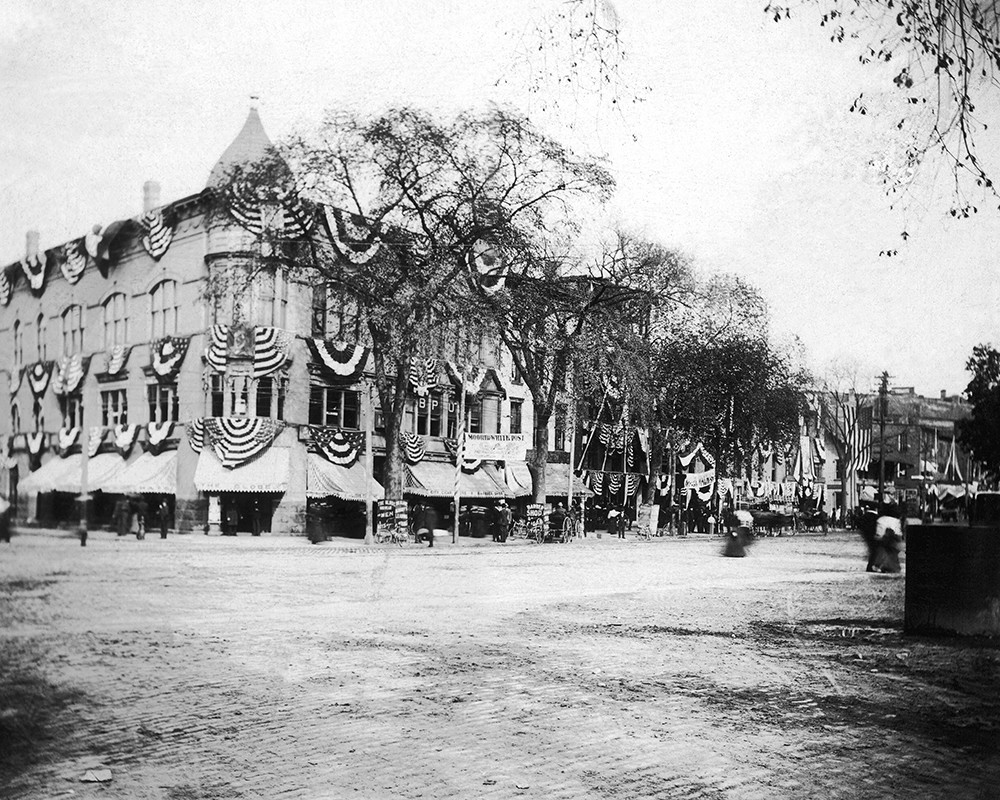
Wooster Square in patriotic decorations (1890s)

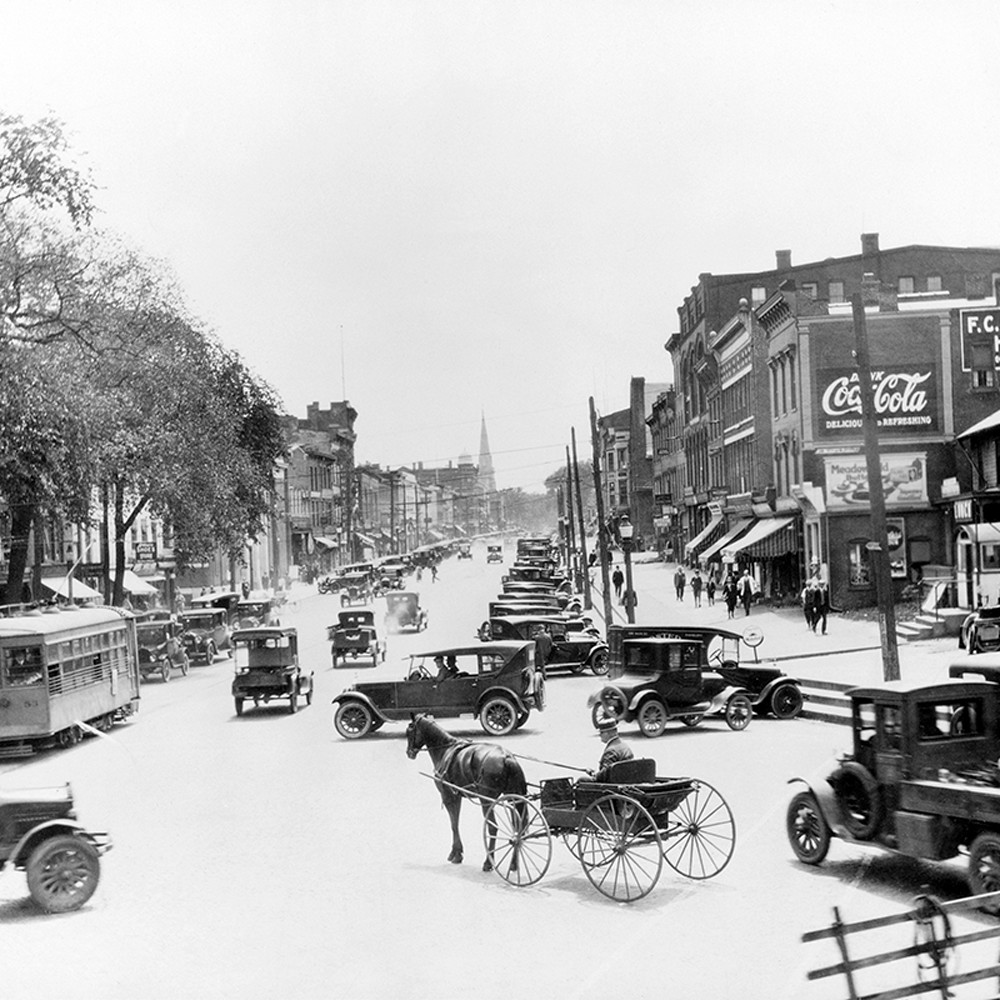
Looking south to Main Street, Danbury (1910)

== See also ==
- National Register of Historic Places listings in Fairfield County, Connecticut
