= John Rider House =

Historic house in Connecticut, United States

- U.S. National Register of Historic Places
- U.S. Historic district – Contributing property
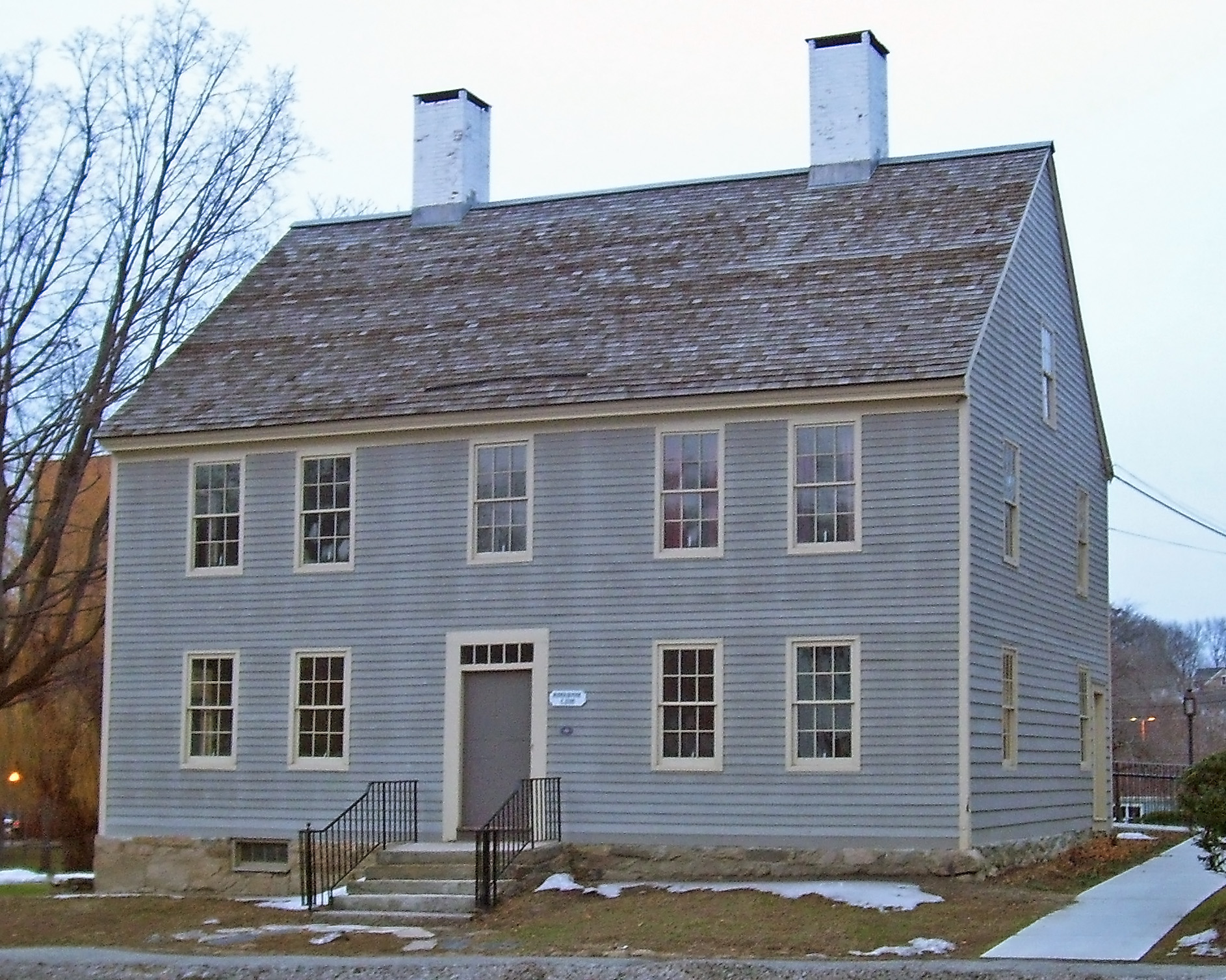
- West (front) elevation and south profile, 2007
- Location: Danbury, CT
- Coordinates: 41°23′19″N 73°26′47″W
- Area: 1.3 acres (0.53 ha)
- Built: 1785
- Architect: John Rider
- Part of: Main Street Historic District
- NRHP reference No.: 77001388
- Added to NRHP: November 23, 1977

The John Rider House is located on Main Street (CT 53) in Danbury, Connecticut, United States. It is a wooden frame house dating to the late 18th century.

It remained in the Rider family until 1925. In the 1940s it was saved from demolition and restored, the beginning of historic preservation efforts in the city. today it is home to the Danbury Museum and Historical Society. It is the oldest house in the city still in its original location.

In 1977 it was listed on the National Register of Historic Places. Six years later, when the Main Street Historic District was designated and listed on the Register, it was considered a contributing property as the oldest building in the district.

== Building ==
The house is located on the east side of Main Street at the south end of the historic district. Its 1.25-acre (0.51 ha) lot includes, at its rear, the 1836 John Dodd Shop, Danbury's oldest commercial building. Also owned by the museum, it is not part of the Register listing and is screened from view by large trees.

Around the house the neighborhood is urban and extensively developed. There are 19th-century houses across the street, large-scale apartment development to the south and commercial buildings to the north where Main Street opens up into Elmwood Park. The terrain is level.

The building itself is a five-by-two-bay clapboard-sided wooden house two and a half stories high on a stone foundation. Two brick chimneys pierce the crest of its steeply pitched gabled roof. Apart from a slightly overhanging cornice at the roofline, it is plain and undecorated. A small lean-to covers part of the rear.

The centrally located front door opens onto a central hall dividing two large front rooms running the length of the house to the kitchen, behind an unusual transomed doorway. There is another back room behind the kitchen. All the interior woodwork, except for a chair rail on the back wall and the wainscoting between the kitchen and stairs, is original. The brick fireplaces have bolection molded surrounds and cyma moldings supporting the mantelpiece.

Two sets of stairs lead up to the second floor. The bedroom fireplaces are smaller and plainer. In the attic the roof framing, with common rafters supported by two purlins braced between the chimneys, can be seen. There are two more fireplaces in the cellar. The lean-to has no original finishings left except for the oak floor.

== History ==
Rider, a local carpenter who had served as a captain in the state militia during the Revolutionary War, built the wood frame house in 1785. It would remain in his family until 1925.

By 1941 it had deteriorated badly, and was to be razed to make way for a gas station. Local preservationists rallied to save it, and it became the first of several buildings owned and operated by the Danbury Museum and Historical Society. It was added to the National Register of Historic Places in 1977.

Today it is operated as a museum by the society. After being closed for extensive renovations in the mid-2000s, it is open once again.

== See also ==
- National Register of Historic Places listings in Fairfield County, Connecticut
