= Rogers Park (Danbury) =

Baseball park in Danbury, Connecticut

Rogers Park is a 56-acre public park and recreational facility in Danbury, Connecticut, United States, located at the end of Main Street at South Street. It hosts six baseball fields, four softball fields, a multi-purpose turf field, eight tennis courts, seven volleyball courts, four handball-paddleball courts, a spray park, a playground, an outdoor ice rink (during cold weather), a concession stand, a pond with a hiking/nature trail, the War Memorial building, several veterans monuments and the Charles Ives House.

== History ==
On December 6, 1935, voters rejected a proposal to turn the Danbury airport into an athletic park. The vote was sparked by complaints of noise generated by the airport. However, the vote focused community attention on the shortage of playgrounds and parks in the city. The local Lions Club pushed the previously rejected idea of the City accepting a donation of 20 acres of swampy land at the intersection of Main Street and South Street from Cephas Rogers. Rogers was a local industrialist who was hard hit by the Depression. The donation would be made for forgiveness of his $6,000 tax debt. The Common Council accepted the offer, and applied to the WPA for funds to drain the land and build access roads and athletic facilities. 200 workers began work in 1937. The project was finished in mid-1940 at a cost of about $175,000, $30,000 of which the City paid. Cephas B. Rogers Park opened in the spring of 1941.

Over the years, the City acquired additional acreage to increase the size of the park.

The War Memorial, a community center that also houses a gymnasium, opened in Rogers Park in 1951, along with Memorial Drive, the road through the middle of the park.

The Charles Ives House was moved to Rogers Park in 1967 from its original site on Main Street.

Rogers Park Field
- Interactive map of Rogers Park Field
- Location: Memorial Drive, Danbury, Connecticut, United States
- Coordinates: 41.383418°N 73.442971°W
- Surface: Natural Grass
- Scoreboard: Yes

Tenant
- Danbury Westerners (NECBL) (1995–present)

== Baseball ==
Rogers Park hosts a baseball venue that consists of six fields: Fields 1, 2, 3 and 4 (which have 60 foot base paths) and Mountainville and Rogers Park Fields (which have 90 foot base paths). Rogers Park Field has been home to the Danbury Westerners of the New England Collegiate Baseball League since 1995.

The first baseball field was built at Rogers Park in the early 1960s. Three more fields were added in the late 1970s. Field 2 was built in the early 1980s. The "Blockhouse", a two-story concession stand with storage and offices, was built in 1992.
