= Danbury Museum and Historical Society =

Museum in Danbury, Connecticut

Coordinates: 41.3886°N 73.4467°W

- Established: 1947
- Location: 43 Main Street, Danbury, Connecticut, United States
- Type: Historical society
- Website: danburymuseum.org

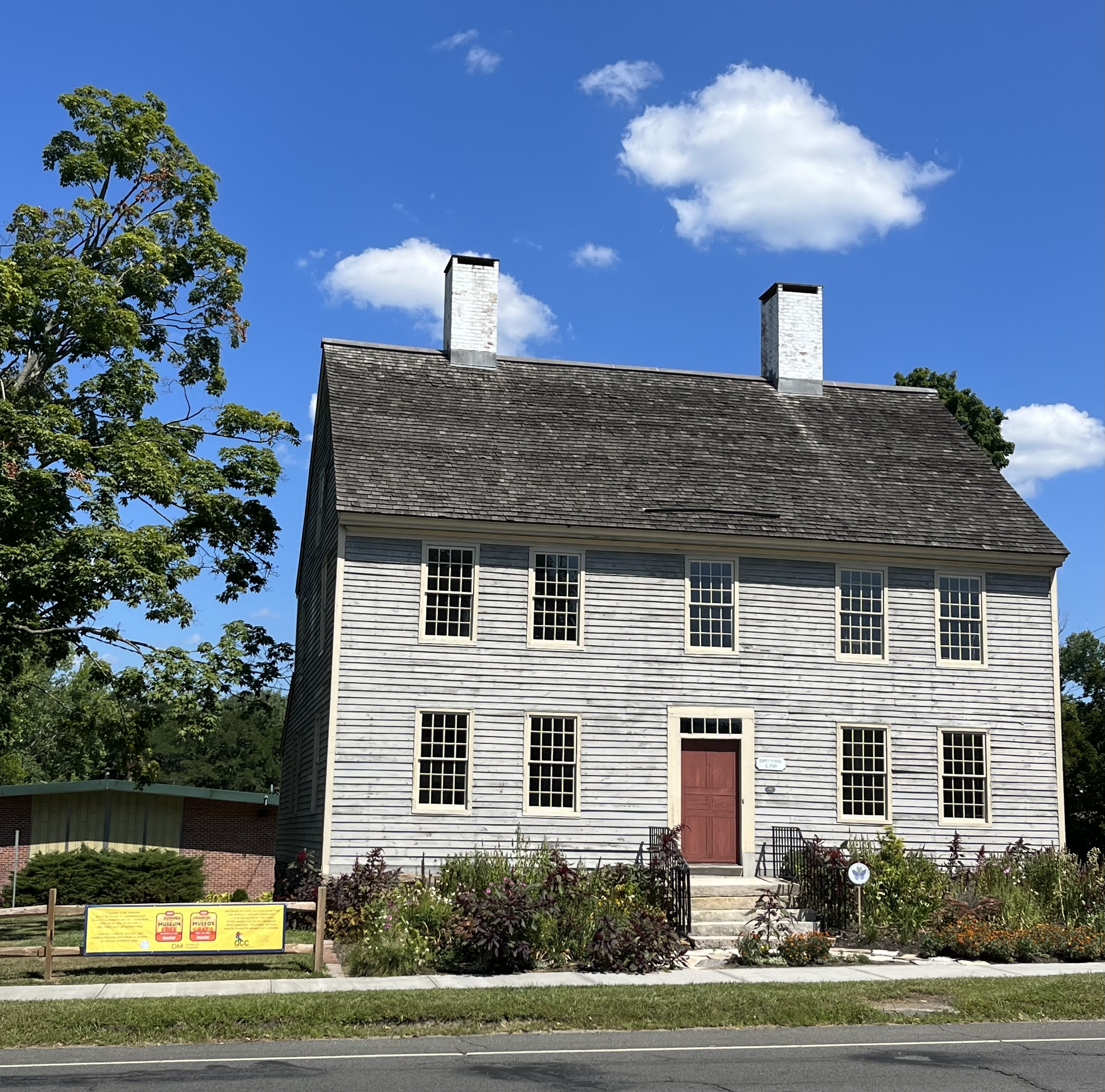
The John Rider House, part of the main campus of the DMHS

The Danbury Museum and Historical Society is a museum located in Danbury, Connecticut, the purpose of which is to acquire, preserve, exhibit, and interpret the heritage of the Greater Danbury area for education, information, and research. The main campus of the museum is located on 43 Main Street. It is home to five historic buildings: Huntington Hall, the 1785 Rider House, the 1790 John Dodd Hat Shop, the Little Red Schoolhouse, and the Marian Anderson Studio. The museum also operates a sixth building: the Charles Ives Birthplace, located on Mountainville Avenue.

== History ==
The Danbury Museum and Historical Society was formed in 1947 as the result of a merger between the Scott Fanton Museum and the Danbury Historical and Arts Center. During the late 19th and 20th centuries, John Fanton, a Danbury industrialist and prominent citizen, and his second wife, Laura Scott, traveled extensively through Europe, Asia, and the Americas and collected artifacts from each country they visited. In 1921, after their deaths, a museum was opened in the Fanton home on Deer Hill Avenue for the purpose of exhibiting these collections.

Twenty years later, in 1941, it was announced that a gas station was to be built on the site of the Rider home, which was built in 1785 and by that time had fallen into disrepair. A group of concerned Danbury citizens, which included the local chapter of the Daughters of the American Revolution, raised the money to purchase the homestead and founded the Danbury Historical Society and Arts Center. The purpose of the organization, for which the Rider house functioned as a meeting place, was to foster appreciation in art, science, history, music, and other public activities.

In 1947 a proposal was made that the Scott-Fanton Museum and the Danbury Historical Society and Arts Center merge. The collections of the Scott-Fanton Museum were moved to the Main Street site, and the Danbury Museum and Historical Society was born. During the 1950s and 1960s, the museum acquired the John Dodd Hat Shop and the Charles Ives House, and erected Huntington Hall where many of its exhibits have been displayed. The most recent acquisition is the Marian Anderson Studio, which was officially restored and opened by the museum in 2004.

== Huntington Hall ==
Huntington Hall was built in 1963. It holds the main offices, the gift shop, and the museum's research library. It is also where many displays are exhibited.

== John Rider House ==
The historic John Rider House was built in 1785, by a Danbury carpenter John Rider, who also served as a captain in the Connecticut militia during the Revolutionary War, and his wife Mary. The house remained in the family, until 1925. The Rider House was saved in 1941 from destruction and has been restored and is open for tours by appointment year-round.

== John Dodd Hat Shop ==
The John Dodd Hat Shop was built in 1790 by Danbury lawyer John Dodd. It was originally used as a legal office, however, rather than a hat shop, and was converted by the museum into a hat shop exhibit. It contains many different styles of hats, as well as hatting machines and materials, in addition to many other historical artifacts and exhibits chronicling the history of hatting in Danbury, also known as Hat City. The museum acquired it in 1957 when it was moved from lower Main Street to the museum grounds. Tours of the John Dodd Hat Shop are offered by the museum by appointment year-round.

== Little Red Schoolhouse ==
The Little Red Schoolhouse is a reproduction of a typical one-room schoolhouse in the greater Danbury area from the late 18th century through the mid-19th century. It was built with bricks from the Balmforth Avenue School, which was torn down in the 1960s. It is open and available for touring by appointment year-round.

== Marian Anderson Studio ==
The Marian Anderson Studio is the studio which was owned by famed opera singer Marian Anderson, who lived in Danbury for more than fifty years. It was located on her estate Marianna Farms, on Joe's Hill Road, until it was acquired by the museum in 1999 and moved to the main site at 43 Main Street. After extensive restoration, including a new roof, the studio was officially opened in 2004. The museum offers tours of the Marian Anderson Studio by appointment year-round.

== See also ==
- Marian Anderson
- Charles Ives
- Danbury, Connecticut
- List of historical societies in Connecticut
