= Dykeman's station =

Dykeman's
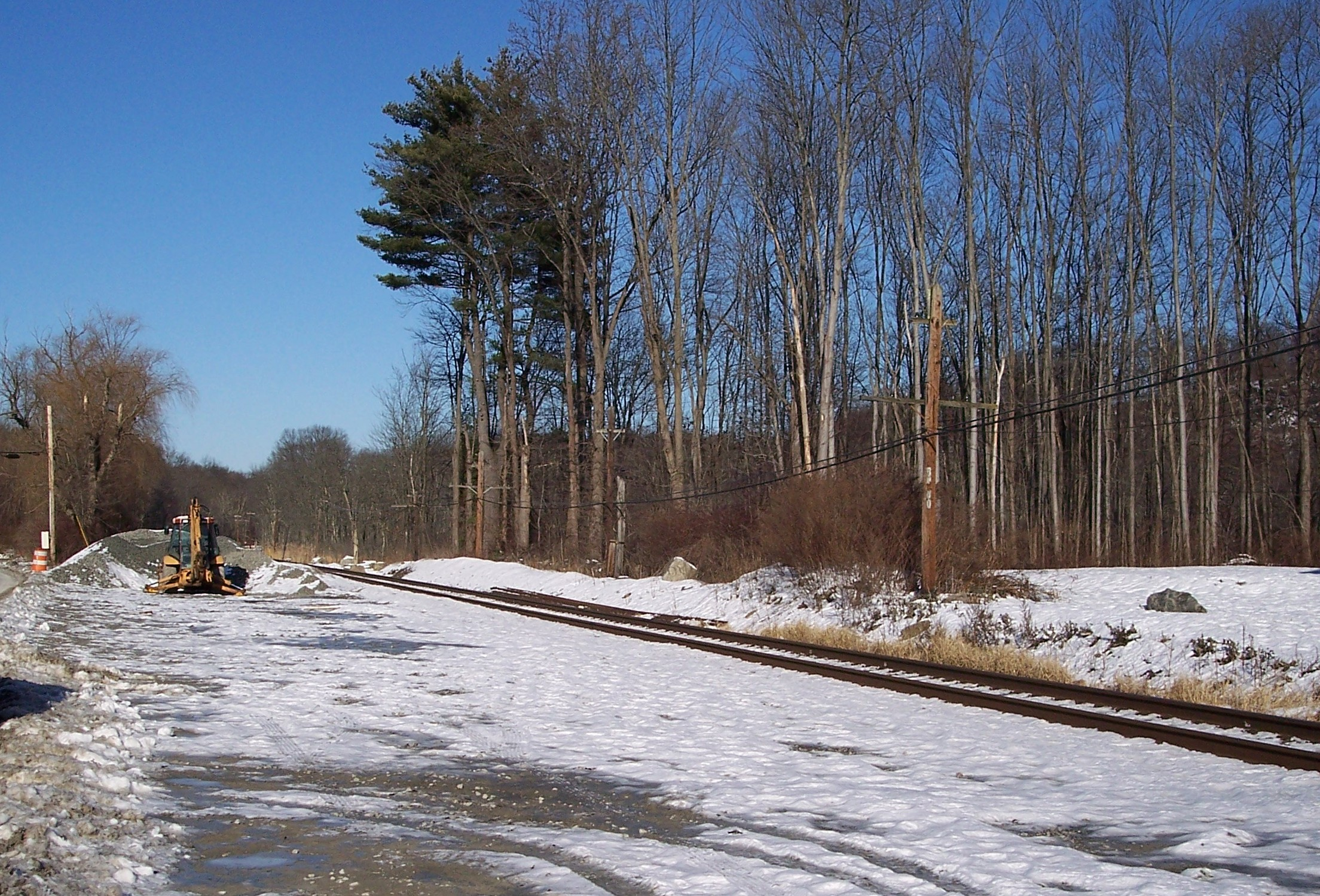
- Looking north at the location of the former Dykeman's station

General information
- Location: 44 Ice Pond Road off of Dykeman Road; Dykemans, Southeast, New York
- Coordinates: 41.4343°N 73.6187°W
- Tracks: 1

History
- Opened: December 31, 1848
- Closed: 1968

Former services
Preceding station	New York Central Railroad	Following station
Brewster toward New York	Harlem Division	Towner's toward Chatham
Location

Dykeman's was a station on the Harlem Line of the New York Central Railroad (now Metro-North Railroad). It was 55 miles from Grand Central Terminal.

== History ==
Rail service in Dykeman's can be traced as far back as 1848 with the establishment of the New York and Harlem Railroad, which became part of the New York Central and Hudson River Railroad in 1864 and eventually taken over by the New York Central Railroad. Dykeman's was also the northern terminus of double tracks on the Harlem Line which were controlled by "Signal Station X" until 1948. The station house was replaced by a small shelter on August 6, 1961, and was closed when the New York Central merged into Penn Central in 1968. No station structures remain at the site, which the MTA replaced with Brewster North Railroad Station in 1980.

== Bibliography ==
- Dana, William B. (1866). The Merchants' Magazine and Commercial Review, Volume 55. New York, New York: William B. Dana.
