= Dykemans, New York =

Hamlet in Southeast, New York, United States

- Hamlet
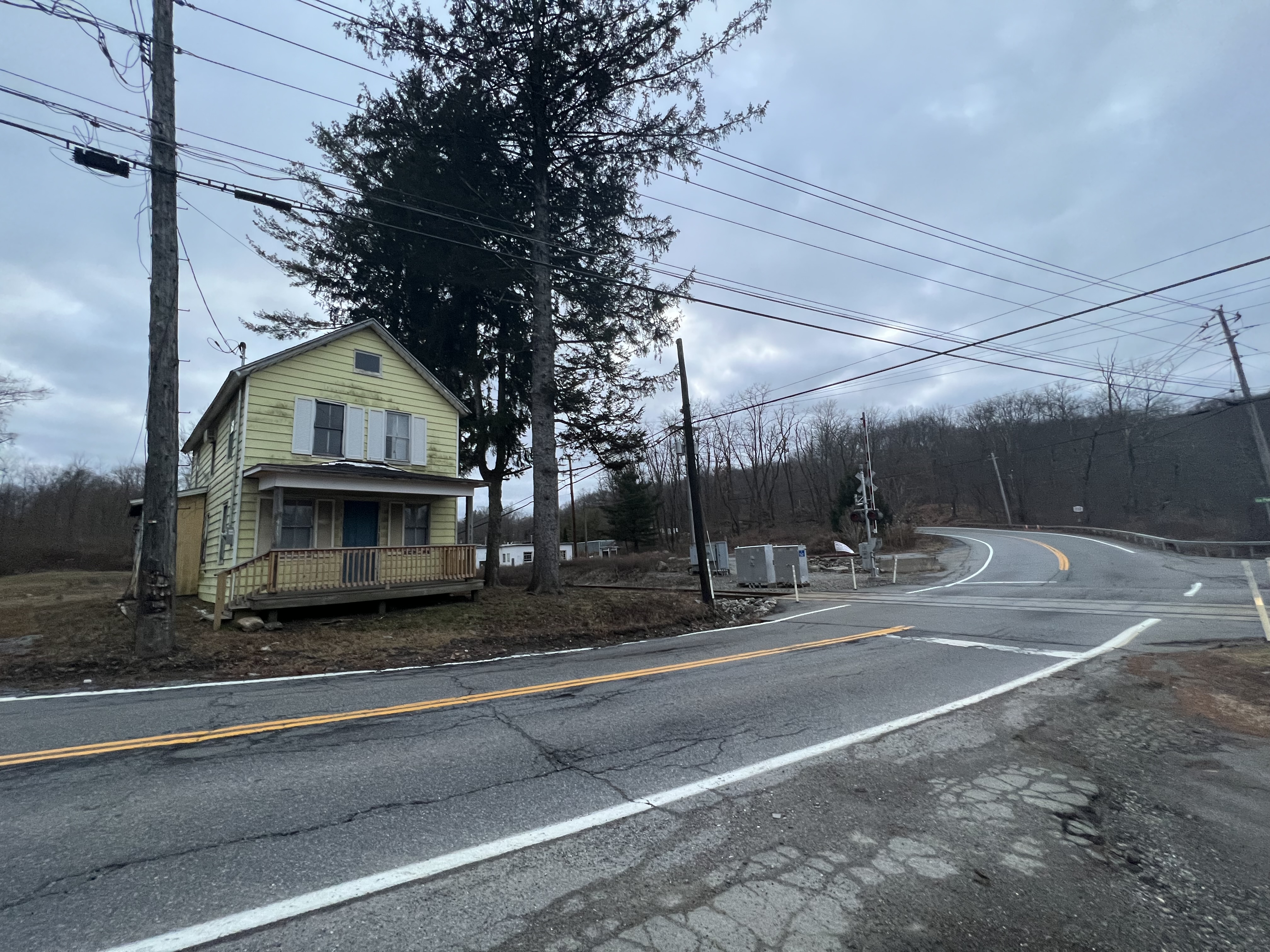
- NY 312 at the Metro-North railroad crossing in Dykemas
- Interactive map of Dykemans, New York
- Coordinates: 41°26′3.34″N 73°37′6.46″W
- Country: United States
- State: New York
- County: Putnam
- Town: Southeast
- Elevation: 367 ft (112 m)
- Time zone: UTC-5 (Eastern (EST))
  - Summer (DST): UTC-4 (EDT)
- ZIP Code: 10509
- Area codes: 845
- GNIS feature ID: 948896

Dykemans is a hamlet in the town of Southeast located in Putnam County, New York, United States.

== History ==
The hamlet was named for the Dykeman family, who were early settlers and descendants of Capt. Joseph Dykeman. Previously called Dykeman's Station, after the former railroad station, it was shortened to its current name. A variant spelling was also "Dykman's."

Dykeman's post office was established on March 19, 1851. Following a brief discontinuation of service, it was reestablished in 1887 and the apostrophe was removed in 1894. The post office was permanently discontinued in January of 1935.

The "Baptist Church and Society of Dykeman's Station" was formed in 1867. It would later be simplified to "Dykeman's Baptist Church and Society" in 1889.

== Geography ==
Dykemans is located north of Brewster Hill and south of Patterson, along NY 312 (Dykeman Road).
