= Danbury Fair =

Annual event in Connecticut, United States

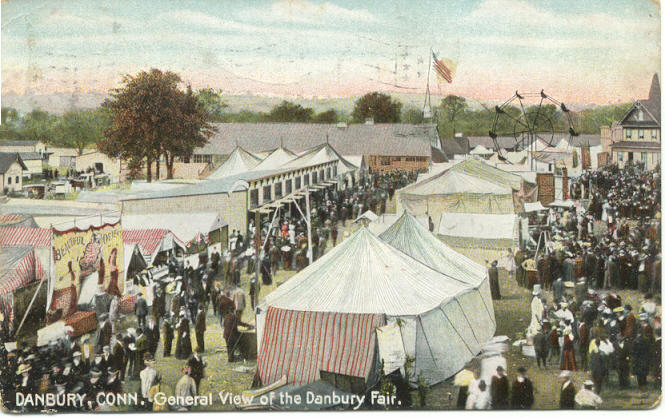
Postcard picture of the fair, about 1908

The Danbury Fair (also known as The Great Danbury State Fair) was a yearly exhibition in Danbury, Connecticut. It was begun in 1821 as an agricultural fair, but did not have a regular schedule until 1869 when hat manufacturers Rundle and White helped form the Danbury Farmers and Manufacturers Society. From then until its closing, the fair was open for ten days every October.

The fair took up 142 acres (0.57 km^{2}) of what Rundle and White had hoped would be a Danbury Pleasure Park. Admission was 25 cents for adults and 15 cents for children. The fair offered everything from tobacco, pears, and home-brewed wines to hats, boots, saddles, carriages, wagons, churns, and stoves. In 1895, more than 1000 people were employed by the fair.

In 1932, a race track was built on the fairgrounds for the midget car and stock car races that had replaced the earlier harness races.

During the 1950s through 1970s, the fair's multiple attractions included New England Village, Dutch Village, lumberjack competitions, oxen draws, sheep shearing contests, music and dancing, puppet shows, animal petting zoos, rides and games, displays of farm machinery, and food and livestock exhibits and judging.

When the fair's owner John Leahy died in 1975, the organization fell into disarray. The escalating value of the land led to the assessment of high estate taxes that compelled the organization to sell it. Meanwhile, due to its prime location, outside entities increasingly expressed interest in purchasing the land, and the amounts they offered to buy it regularly increased. The last day of the fair was October 12, 1981, with an estimated 400,000 people having attended that year. All of the rides, attractions, and holdings were auctioned off. The Danbury Fair Mall was built on the fairgrounds by the Wilmorite Corporation. Photos of the fair and original signs used to be found in the mall's food court.

The fair featured large fiberglass sculptures of characters such as Uncle Sam and Paul Bunyan. Many of these were purchased after the fair was closed, and continue to exist. Notably, Jack Gillette purchased hundreds of objects to put on display at the Magic Forest amusement park in Lake George, New York. (Photo of Uncle Sam at Magic Forest in Lake George, New York). The sculpture of Uncle Sam is 38 feet tall and is claimed to be the tallest Uncle Sam in the world. The Uncle Sam statue returned to its home in Danbury in 2019 and is located at the Danbury Railway Museum. The sculpture of Paul Bunyan was manufactured by International Fiberglass, which mass-produced identical sculptures to sell to stores such as tire or muffler shops (thus the sculptures are generally referred to as Muffler Men). The Danbury Fair Paul Bunyan was eventually painted like a "hippy" and moved to Max Yasgur's Farm in Bethel, New York (home of annual Woodstock reunions).
