= Mill Plain =

Mill Plain may refer to:

- Mill Plain, Washington, an unincorporated area in Clark County, Washington, United States
- Mill Plain, Danbury, Connecticut, an unincorporated area in the City of Danbury, Connecticut, United States
- Mill Plain, Fairfield, Connecticut, a census-designated place in Fairfield County, Connecticut, United States
- Mill Plain station, a former rail station in Danbury, Connecticut, United States
- Mill Plain BRT, a bus rapid transit route in Vancouver, Washington, United States
