= Mill Plain, Connecticut =

There are two places named Mill Plain in the U.S. state of Connecticut:

- Mill Plain, Danbury, Connecticut
- Mill Plain, Fairfield, Connecticut
