= Miry Brook, Connecticut =

Locality in Danbury, Connecticut, United States

- Unincorporated
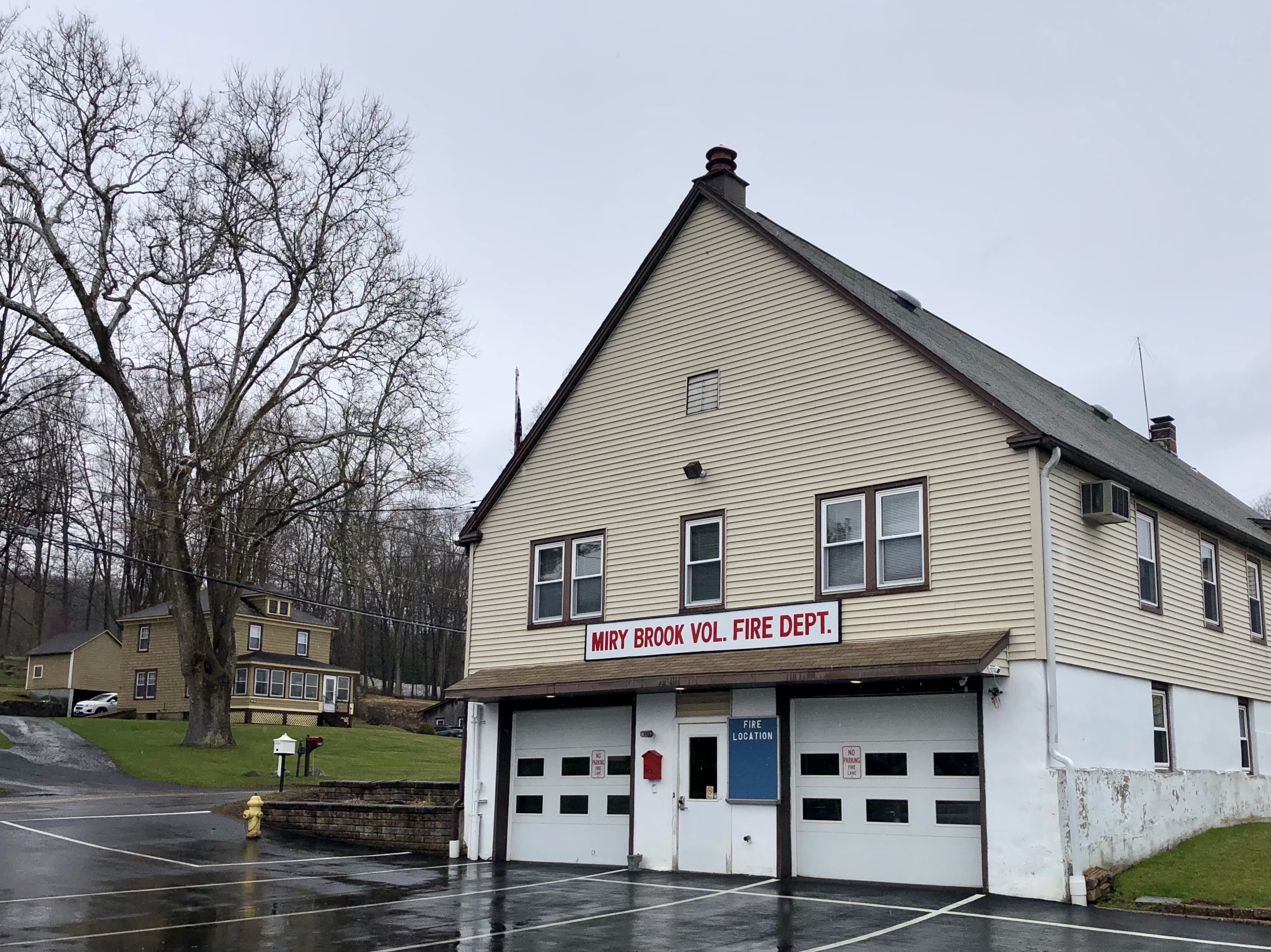
- Miry Brook Volunteer Fire Department in 2022

- Location in Connecticut Location in the United States
- Coordinates: 41°21′59.34″N 73°28′56.44″W
- Country: United States
- U.S. state: Connecticut
- County: Fairfield
- Region: Western CT
- City: Danbury

Miry Brook is an unincorporated area in the City of Danbury in Fairfield County, Connecticut. It is located in the western part of the city, bordering Mill Plain to the north and west at Lake Kenosia and the town of Ridgefield, Connecticut, to the southwest. The Danbury Airport is located in Miry Brook.

== History ==
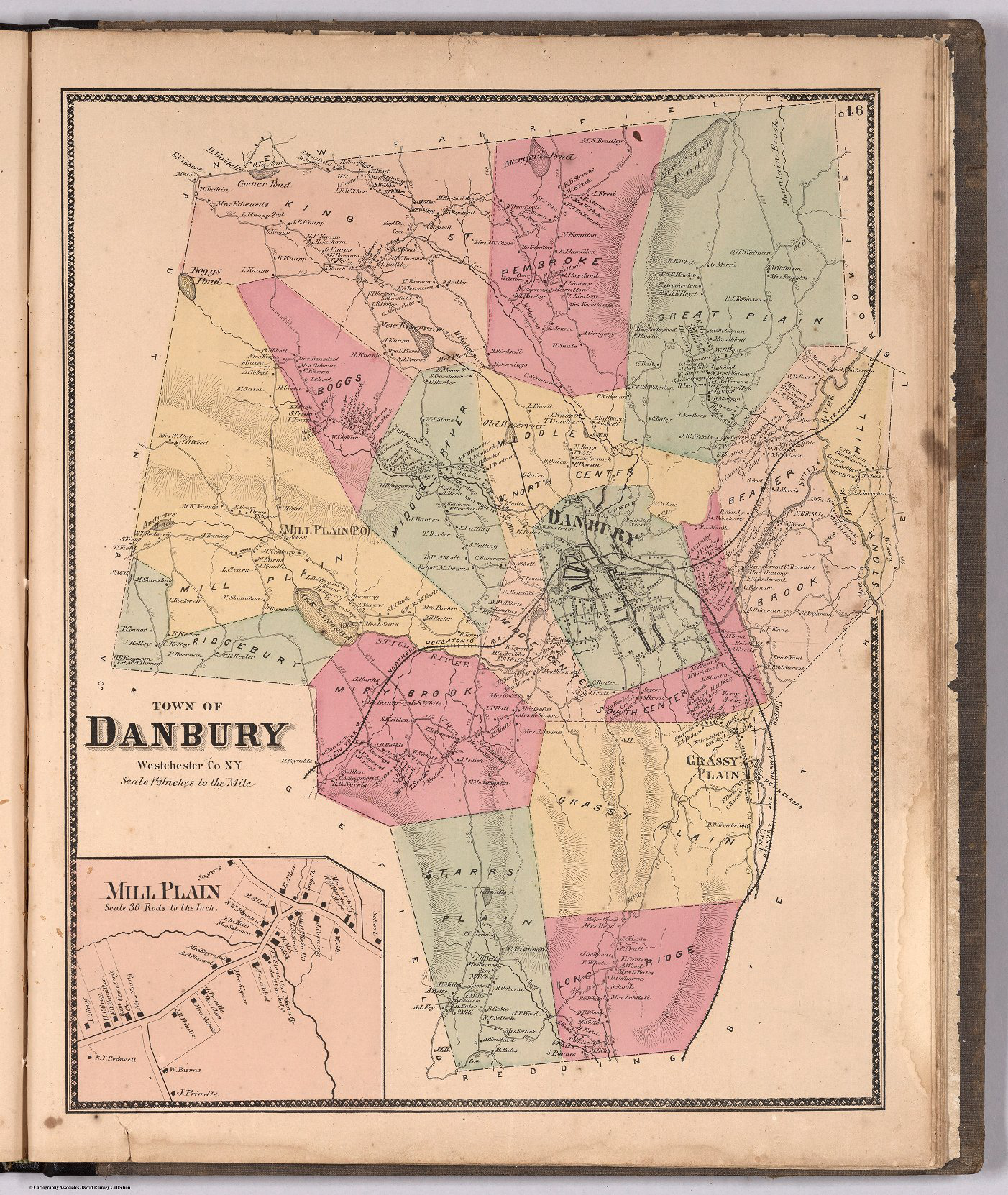
1867 Map of Danbury

The name Miry Brook is derived from the presence of swampland or “mire,” which makes up the landscape of the area, as well as the aptly named stream or “brook” that runs through it. According to local tradition however, it was named after an incident that occurred during the 1777 British retreat from Danbury (see Battle of Ridgefield), in which the Americans destroyed the bridge at Wolf Pond Run to impede the British, causing them a delay and mired artillery. While this story may be true, it is not what gave rise to the name of the waterway and area, as there are recorded mentions of Miry Brook from as early as 1712.

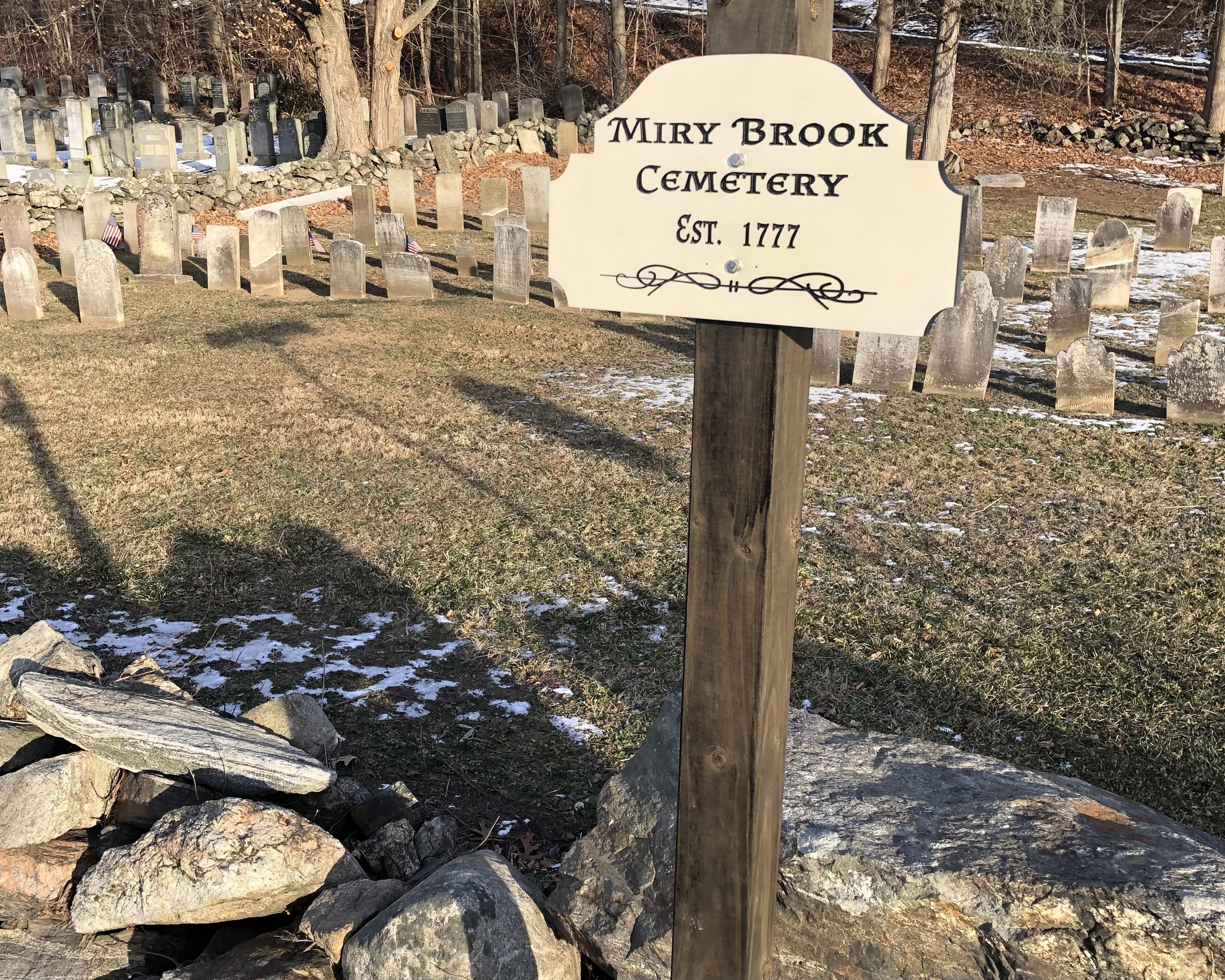

=== Miry Brook School ===
Although almost unrecognizable today, the Miry Brook Schoolhouse is one of four original district schools remaining in Danbury. In the early 1900s it was considered a "model rural school," and was part of a training program, where Danbury Normal School (now WestConn) students completed their student teaching labs. It would later become the auxiliary police headquarters & Civil Defense Building, and has since undergone major modifications.

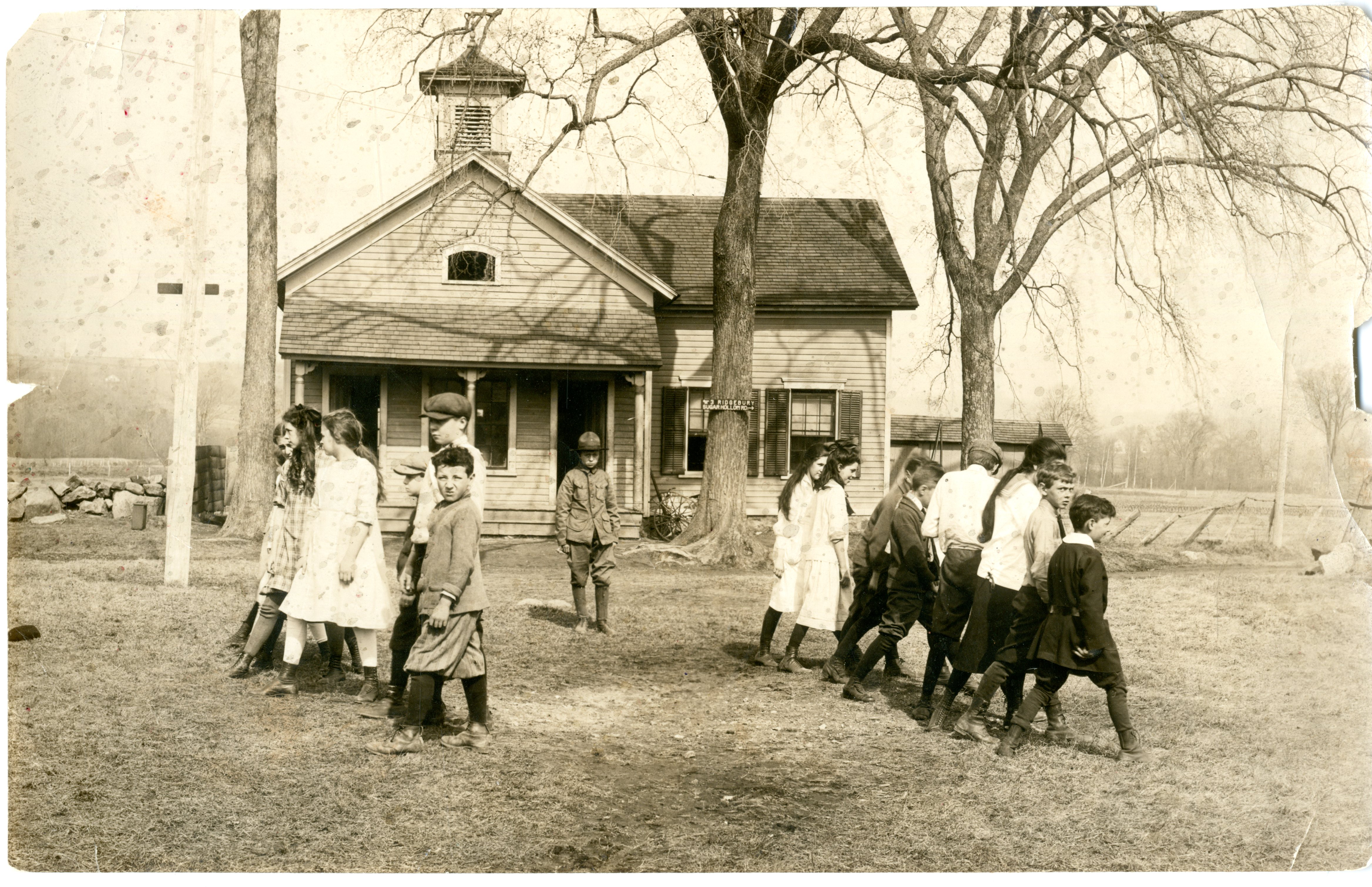
Miry Brook Dist. School in 1912

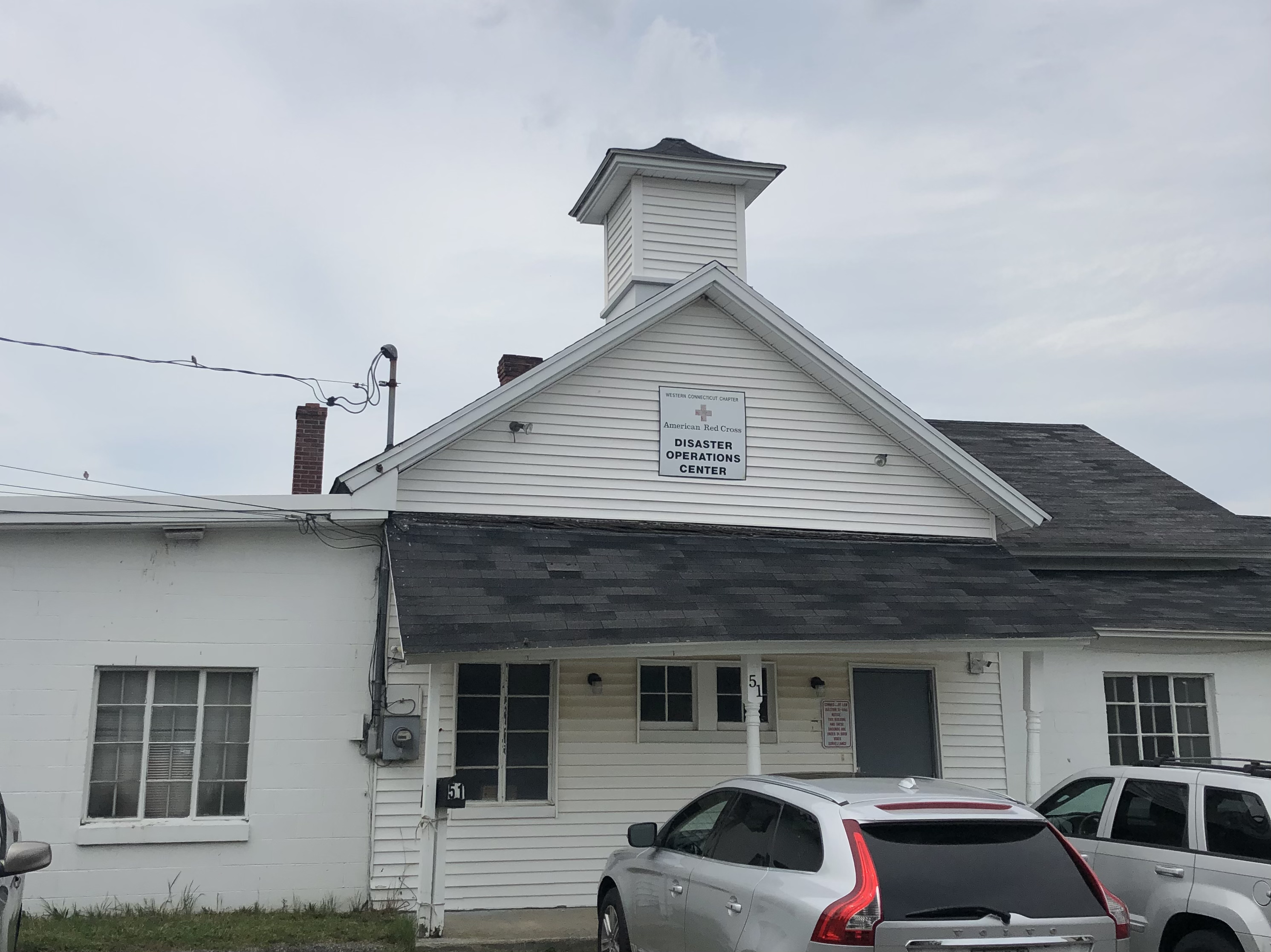
Former schoolhouse in 2021

== Watershed ==
As its name suggests, Miry Brook consists of a primary waterway surrounded by swampy wetlands. The Miry Brook itself begins in Ridgefield and runs throughout Danbury until it reaches the Still River and feeds into it as one of its major tributaries. This connects Miry Brook to the Housatonic River and Long Island Sound.

== Development ==
In recent years, the area has become known as a high-end automotive district, known locally as the Miry Brook Corridor. Although Porsche and Audi dealerships were established in the area long ago, Miry Brook's reputation as a "mecca for high-end autos" truly began in 2018, when Scuderia Cameron Glickenhaus acquired a factory site here for the production of supercars, including its 004S and 006S series cars. Two years later, North American Motor Car began construction on a 50,000-square-foot (4,600 m^{2}) luxury car storage facility. It is the largest of its kind in Fairfield County. Since then, growth has only continued, with car companies like Mercedes-Benz and Ineos Grenadier deciding to build dealerships and staking their place in the corridor.

== Education ==
- Wooster School
- Danbury High School West
- BEAM Elementary School

== Parks and recreation ==
- Danbury Dog Park
