= Westside Middle School Academy =

Public school in Danbury, Connecticut

Location
- 1 School Ridge Road; Danbury, Connecticut; United States
- Coordinates: 41°23′16″N 73°28′50″W

Information
- School type: Middle school
- School board: Danbury Public Schools
- Superintendent: Kara Casimiro
- Principal: Michael Flynn
- Grades: 6-8
- Enrollment: 750+
- Language: English
- Website: sites.google.com/danbury.k12.ct.us/wsmsa/home

Westside Middle School Academy is a middle school located in the city of Danbury, Connecticut, United States. The school has approximately between 700 and 750 students from grade 6 to grade 8. The school offers various sports for all grades such as basketball and soccer as well as track and field and futsal. There is also a band and engineering program. The school also has an official health center. After graduation, students move on to Danbury High School, Henry Abbott Technical High School and other options. The school is split into two academies, STEM and Global Studies which offers students different classes making the school extremely versatile. It is the only school in the Danbury Public Schools district that uses a lottery to select students into the school.

== Jennifer Blue scandal ==
The Jennifer Blue scandal is a solved criminal larceny case between Jennifer Blue, now former principal of Westside Middle School Academy, Danbury Public Schools and the city of Danbury, Connecticut.

On June 13, 2024, Blue resigned from her position as principal at the school as an investigation into her use of school funds and money was underway. This came after superintendent Kara Casimiro gave information to the police department of the city of Danbury on Blue's case. The investigation into the case continued from June to October 23, 2024 when it was announced that Blue was charged with first degree larceny after it was revealed that she had purchased several items worth together up to $5,500 with Westside's debit card. Furtherly it was also revealed that Blue herself along with the superintendent and others had a meeting involving this issue which ended in the spiral leading to the then further arrest of Blue.

On October 29, 2024, The News Times of Danbury released an article showing that Blue had wasted the money on the school's debit card with jewelry, DoorDash, H&M, a trip to Punta Cuna, Dominican Republic and more with a significant portion of the money being transacted during May 2024. Furtherly, a court appeal was made by Blue scheduled on November 5, 2024.
