= Westside Middle School =

Westside Middle School or West Side Middle School may refer to:

- Westside Middle School (Nebraska)
- Westside Middle School in Barrow County, Georgia
- Westside Middle School in Groton, Connecticut
- West Side Middle School in Elkhart, Indiana
- West Side Middle School in Waterbury, Connecticut
- Westside Consolidated School District in Craighead County, Arkansas, the site of the 1998 Westside Middle School shooting
- Westside Middle School Academy in Danbury, Connecticut
