= Arthur A. Harris Linear Park =

Connecticut trail

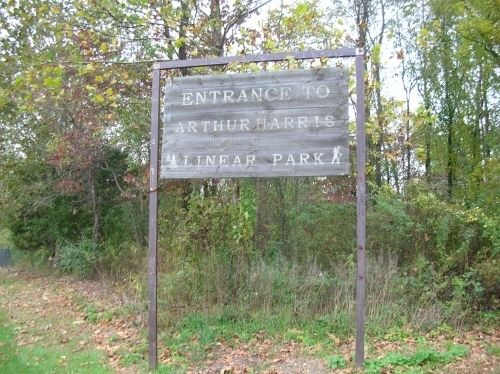
- Sign at the main entrance
- Length: 1.5 miles (2.4 km)
- Location: Brookfield, CT
- Trailheads: Municipal Center
- Use: Cycling, jogging
- Season: All (no winter maintenance)
- Sights: Still River
- Surface: Asphalt
- Website: Park map

The Arthur A. Harris Linear Park is a multi-use trail along the Still River in Brookfield, Connecticut. The park consists of a trail that loops around through the woods while running parallel to the Still River, and merges with the Still River Greenway by the trail entrance. A gazebo is located about 0.4 miles (0.64 km) past the entrance of the trail, and park benches are located at the end of the paved section of the trail, immediately before the unpaved section begins to complete the loop.

== History ==
The trail is named after Arthur A. Harris, the former Conservation Commission chairman who had the idea in 1967 to build a narrow park running along the Route 7 highway from Norwalk to New Milford. The trail was officially dedicated in the Summer of 2010.

== See also ==
- Still River
