= Henry Abbott Technical High School =

Location
- 21 Hayestown Avenue; Danbury, Connecticut 06811; United States
- Coordinates: 41°24′46″N 73°27′14″W

Information
- School type: Technical/Vocational School
- School district: Connecticut Technical Education and Career System
- CEEB code: 070123
- Principal: Kevin Durkin
- Teaching staff: 58.30 (FTE)
- Grades: 9–12
- Enrollment: 692 (2023–2024)
- Student to teacher ratio: 11.87
- Colors: Blue and white
- Mascot: Wolverine
- Website: abbott.cttech.org

Henry Abbott Technical High School, or Abbott Tech, is a technical high school in Danbury, in Connecticut. It is among four high schools within Danbury, which include Danbury High School, Alternative Center for Excellence, and Immaculate High School. Abbott Tech receives students from many nearby towns.

In May 2018, a Derecho blew a piece of metal off of the roof of the high school's stadium, which hit and severely injured an eighth grader.

== Technologies ==
In addition to an academic program leading to a high school diploma, students attending Abbott Tech receive training in one of the following trades and technologies:

- Automotive Technology
- Carpentry
- Collision Repair
- Culinary Arts
- Electrical
- Graphics Technology
- Hairdressing and Cosmetology
- Heating, Ventilation, and Air Conditioning (HVAC)
- Health Technology
- Mechanical Design and Engineering Technology
- Plumbing and Heating
- Precision Machining Technology

== Renovations ==
Renovations to refurbish the academic wing, and add on two new shop wings, along with a new parking lot and sport field, were completed in 2009 at a cost of $57 million. In 2011 Abbott Tech won the third annual Connecticut Light and Power ‘Live Green Win Green’ contest. Abbott Tech beat out 20 other high schools to win $20,000 to fund environmental improvements at the school. In 2012, Abbott Tech was selected as a runner-up for CT light & Power ‘Live Green Win Green’ competition earning a grant of $5000. In May 2014, Abbott Tech students won the Clean Energy Grant by presenting energy-saving solutions for their school at the Connecticut Clean Trades Summit.

== Notable alumni ==
- Joe Lahoud, former Major League Baseball player
