= Danbury High School West =

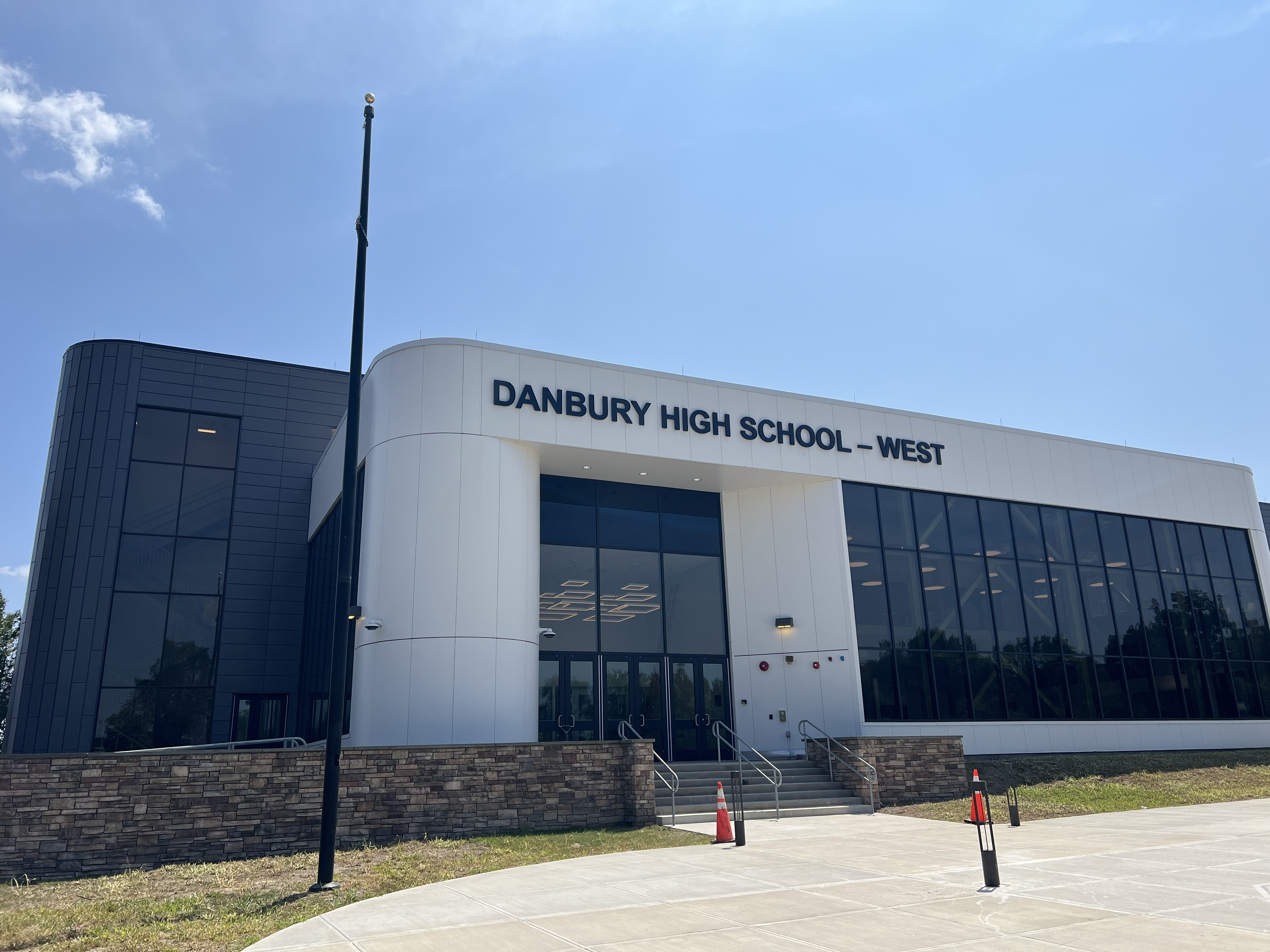
- Danbury High School West in August 2025

Location
- 40 Apple Ridge Road; Danbury, Connecticut 06810; United States
- 41°22′35″N 73°29′52″W

Information
- Type: Public
- Established: 2025
- School district: Danbury School District
- Grades: 9th–12th
- Enrollment: 800
- Campus size: 24 acres (97,000 m^{2})
- Website: https://dhs.danbury.k12.ct.us/

Danbury High School West is a public high school in Danbury, Connecticut. Located in the Miry Brook section of the city, the campus sits on a hilltop overlooking Lake Kenosia and the Danbury Fair Mall. The school opened on August 26, 2025, as part of the Danbury Public Schools district.

== History and development ==
In June 2022, Danbury voters approved a $208 million bond referendum to fund a new educational facility, allocating approximately $164 million to convert the former Cartus Corporation headquarters into the Danbury Career Academy. Originally intended to serve middle and high school students, the project was later modified to accommodate only high school grades, with an estimated enrollment of 1,400 students.

In June 2024, the Danbury Board of Education officially renamed the project “Danbury High School West” to acknowledge it as an extension of the original Danbury High School and to reinforce a unified campus identity.

=== Construction ===
By October 2024, construction had entered its second phase, which included the completion of the school gymnasium.

In January 2025, initial occupancy was set for August 4 of that year, although the timeline was described as "fluid." The school officially opened on August 26, 2025.

== Purpose ==
Danbury High School West was established to relieve overcrowding at Danbury High School's main campus, which is the largest high school in both the state of Connecticut and New England. Additionally, the facility serves to support career pathway programs and a career academy model, consistent with its original purpose.

== Academies and facilities ==
DHS West opened with three career academies:

- Clean Energy & Green Design
- Scientific Innovation & Medicine
- Emerging Technologies & Entrepreneurship

To support these programs, the campus includes facilities such as an EMT lab, allied health rooms, renewable energy laboratories, a greenhouse space, and an AI prosthetics lab.
