= Still River Greenway =

Trail in Brookfield, Connecticut

Coordinates: 41°28′4.1″N 73°24′4.9″W

- Logo of the Still River Greenway
- Length: 2.25 mi (3.62 km)
- Location: Brookfield, CT
- Trailheads: Municipal Center/Town Center
- Use: Cycling, jogging
- Season: All (no winter maintenance)
- Sights: Still River
- Surface: Asphalt
- Website: Greenway website

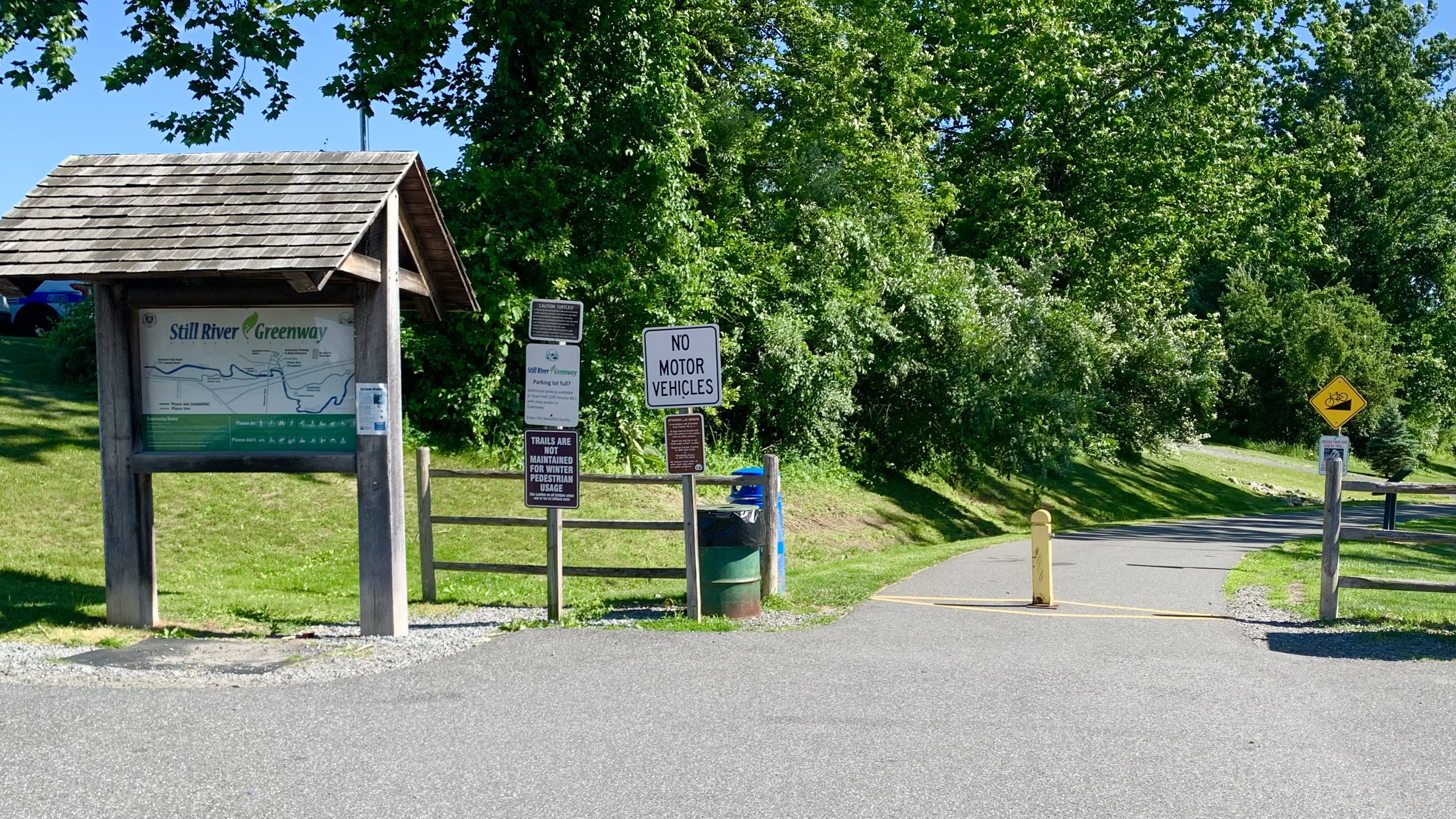
Entrance to the Still River Greenway

The Still River Greenway is a multi-use trail and greenway along the Still River in Brookfield, Connecticut. With both phases complete, the trail runs from the Brookfield Municipal Center to the Brookfield Town Center (also known as the "Four Corners" district) and is completely paved. The other section of the trail runs from the Municipal Center, and loops around in the woods.

== History ==
The concept of a greenway in Brookfield was first proposed in 2000, when the Town of Brookfield conducted a Residents Needs Assessments study. Construction began in 2011, with Phase One (the Silvermine Road entrance) being completed in 2012 and Phase Two (the remainder of the trail) being completed in 2016. A total of 20,000 to 30,000 people are expected to use the greenway in its first year.

There are plans to connect the greenway to points north in New Milford, and to the south in Danbury. The eventual goal is to create a trail network that stretches from New Milford to Norwalk, where it would connect into the East Coast Greenway.

== Trail description ==
The trail is 2.25 miles long, with one entrance located on Silvermine Road and the other entrance located on Federal Road. The trail passes under Route 7 and over the Still River via a bridge (which happens to be the longest footbridge in the State of Connecticut). At the Federal Road entrance, the trail connects to the Brookfield Center sidewalk, making for easy access to the downtown area of Brookfield. Another portion of the trail begins at the Arthur A. Harris Linear Park and shortly parallels the Still River, then loops around in the woods.

== See also ==
- Still River
