= P. Robinson Fur Cutting Company =

- U.S. National Register of Historic Places
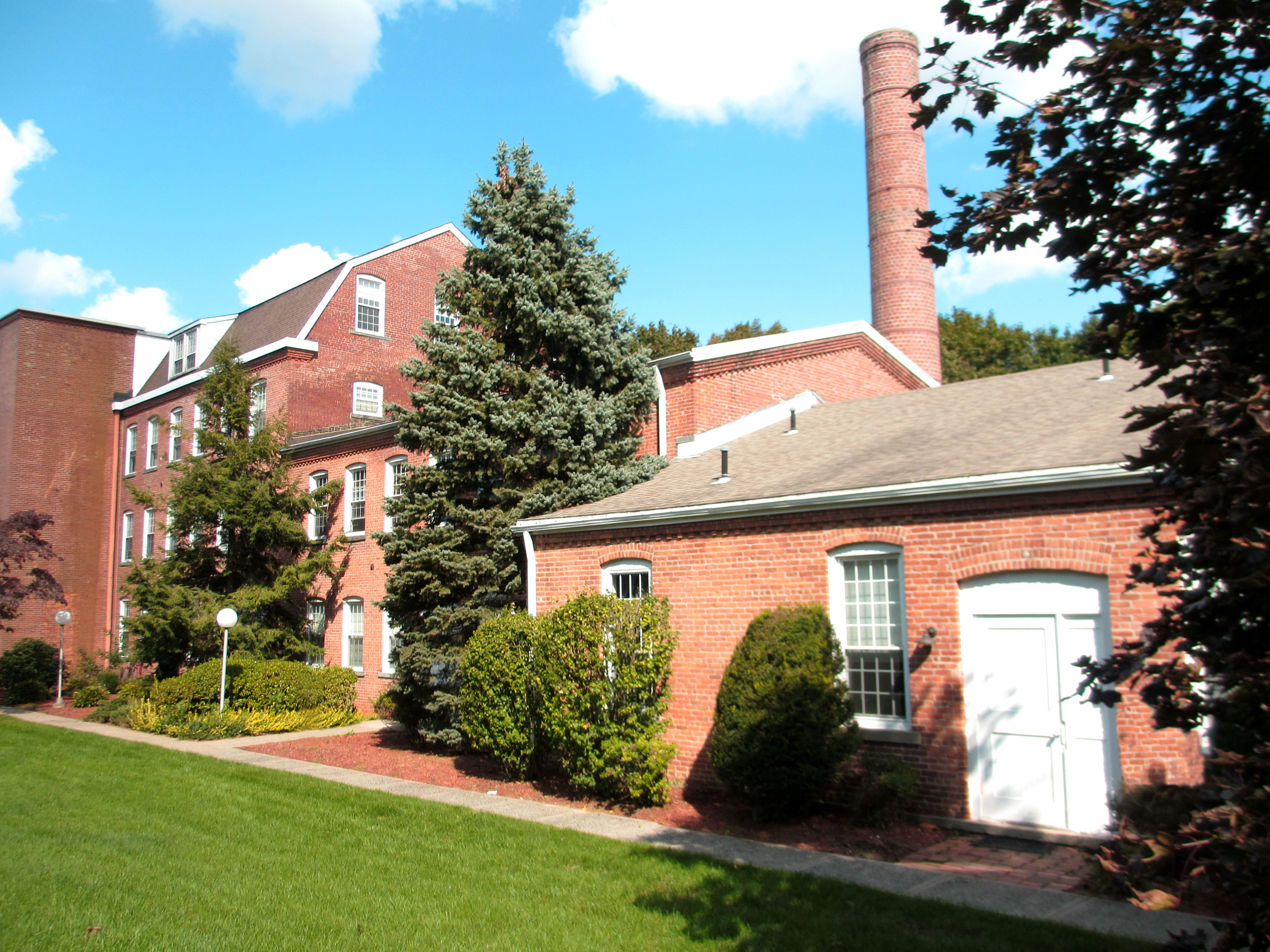

- Location within Connecticut Location within the United States
- Location: Oil Mill Road, Danbury, Connecticut
- Coordinates: 41°23′26″N 73°27′51″W
- Area: 2.5 acres (1.0 ha)
- Built: 1884
- Architectural style: Colonial Revival
- NRHP reference No.: 82000998
- Added to NRHP: November 30, 1982

The P. Robinson Fur Cutting Company is a historic industrial building on Oil Mill Road in Danbury, Connecticut. Also known as the Oil Mill Road building, it is a large multi-section 4 1/2-story brick structure set on the banks of the Still River. Built in stages over the last two decades of the 19th century, it is the last surviving industrial building associated with the fur-cutting and felt-making elements of the hatting industry which dominated Danbury's economy for many years.

The building was listed on the National Register of Historic Places on November 30, 1982.

== See also ==
- National Register of Historic Places listings in Fairfield County, Connecticut
