= Mill Plain, Danbury, Connecticut =

Locality in Danbury, Connecticut, United States

Mill Plain, Connecticut
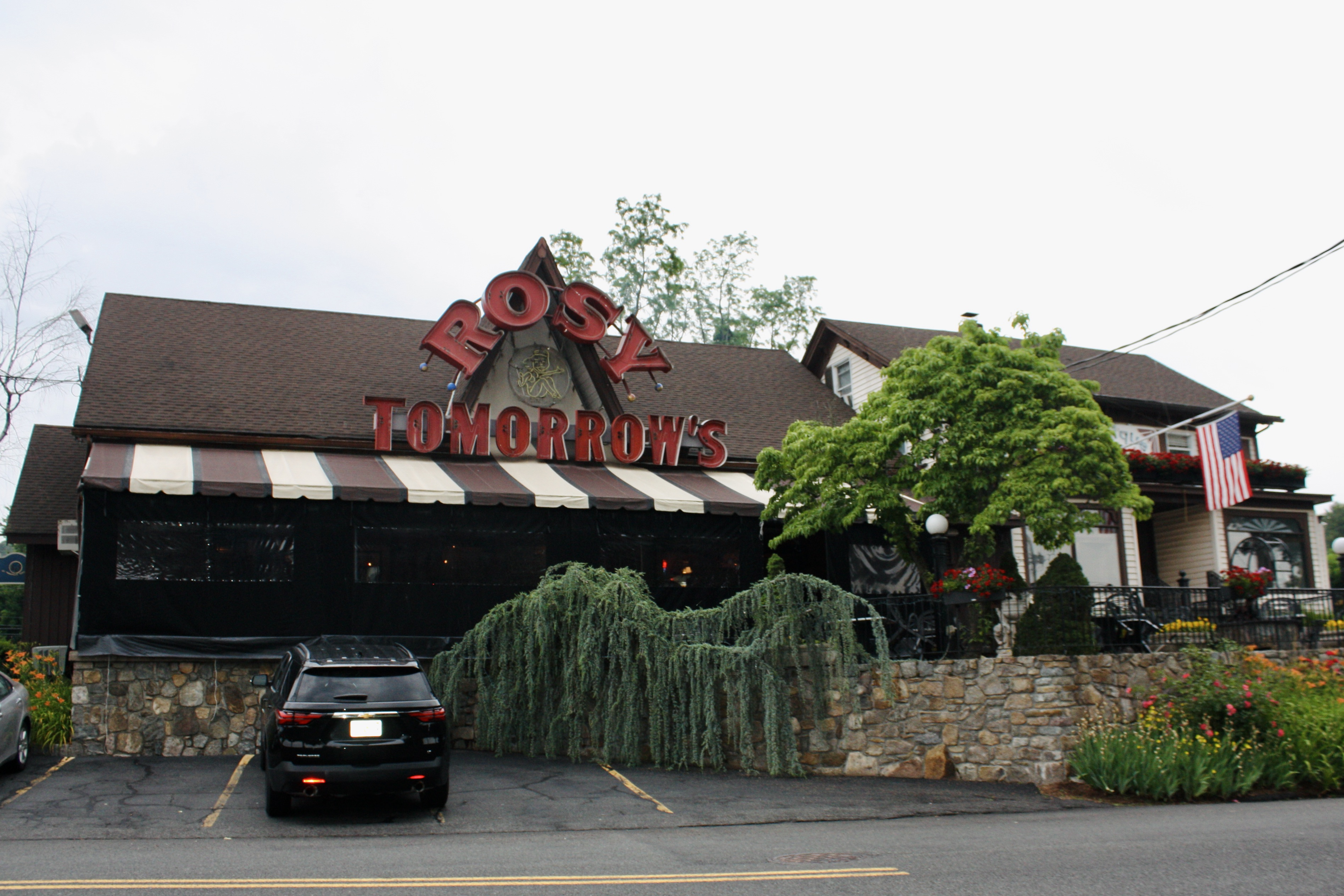
- Rosy Tomorrow’s, Old Mill Plain Road

- Location in Connecticut Location in the United States
- Coordinates: 41°23′42.34″N 73°30′56.45″W
- Country: United States
- U.S. state: Connecticut
- County: Fairfield
- Region: Western CT
- City: Danbury

Mill Plain is an unincorporated area in the City of Danbury, Connecticut, United States. It is located in the westernmost part of the city, bordering the town of Southeast, New York.

The area has historically been defined as a village within Danbury, and has also been described as a semi-autonomous hamlet.

== History ==
The first home in the area was built around 1720 by Nathaniel Stevens. By 1725 Samuel Castle had built his second grist mill, located in this section of town, which gave rise to the name Mill Plain. An early mention of Mill Plain is found in a 1769 deed for 20 acres (8.1 ha) of land near a stream "that runs into ye Mill Plain Pond," which is the original name for Lake Kenosia. The area belonged to the town of Ridgefield at that time.

The Baptist Church of Mill Plain was constituted in 1851, when a council formally recognized the new congregation after nineteen members were granted letters of dismission from the Danbury Baptist Church to form it. In the late 19th century, it transitioned into an Advent Christian Church under Rev. Elisha Ellis, who founded the Advent Christian mission there around 1893.

Also built in 1851 was the Mill Plain Union Church, which stood at the center of the community for 140 years. It served the Second Ecclesiastical Society of Danbury, which had been established as a division from the First Ecclesiastical Society. The church was constructed in the traditional Protestant missionary style. The Second Ecclesiastical Society disbanded in 1907, at which point it merged with the First Congregational Church of Danbury. Despite being listed on the Connecticut State Register of Historic Places, the building ultimately deteriorated and was demolished.

In 1865, resident Henry M. Senior opened a general store and post office. Five years later, Senior built a hat manufacturing shop in the area, which operated until 1892. Mill Plain station was built in 1881 and closed in 1928 after being acquired by the New York, New Haven and Hartford Railroad. The post office was operated by the Senior family until the 1940s.

In 1945, the Mill Plain Independent Hose Company No. 12 was established as the area's volunteer fire department.

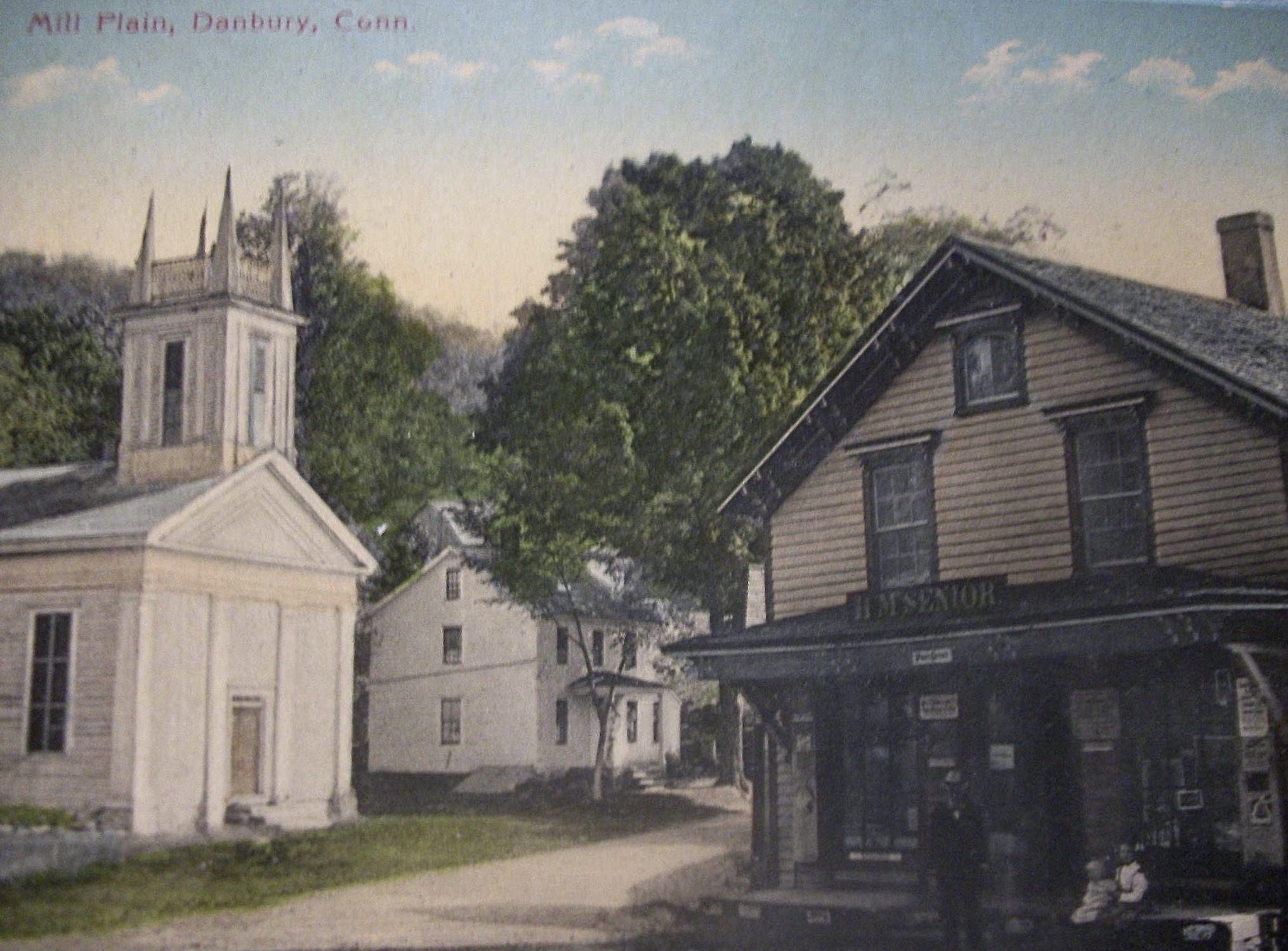
Old Mill Plain (1910)

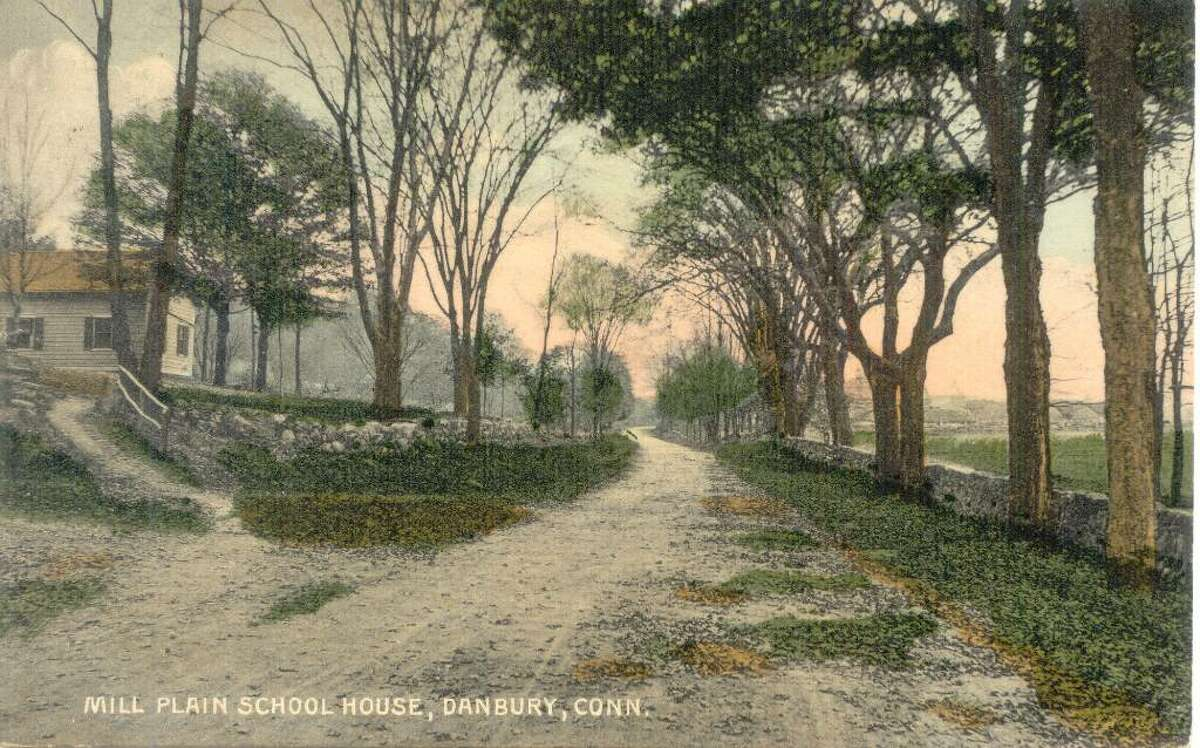
Mill Plain School House, Danbury, Conn. (1909)

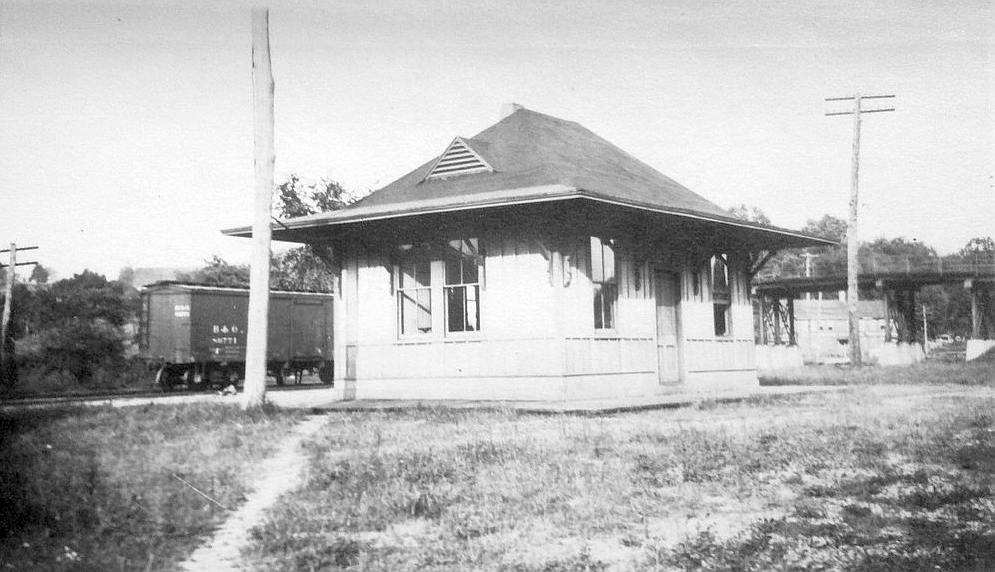
Mill Plain Railroad Station (1916)

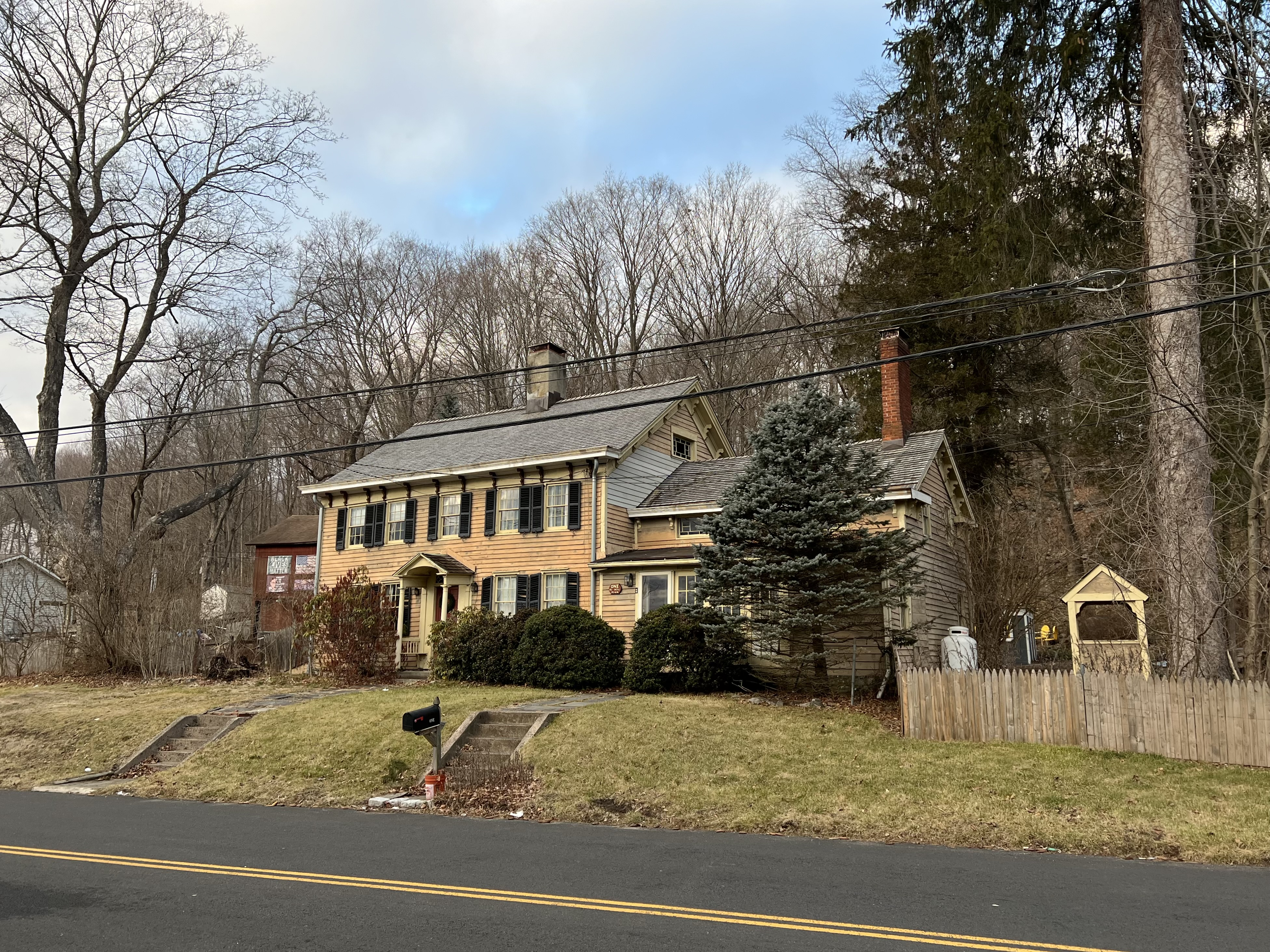
House at 1 Old Mill Plain Road (c. 1750)

=== Development ===
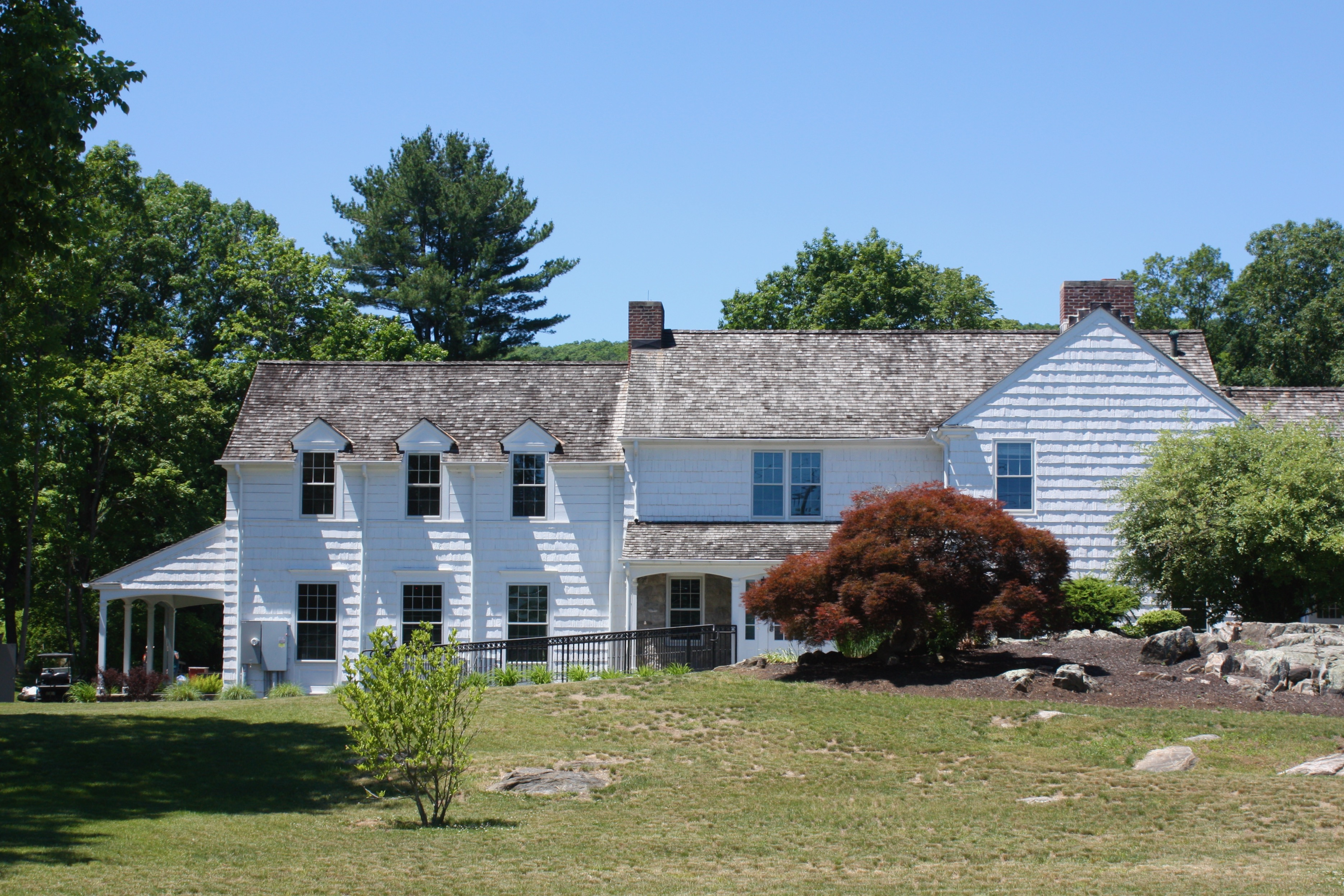
Richter Association for the Arts

After World War II, suburban development accelerated in the Mill Plain district, particularly in the area's northern hills known as Aunt Hack Ridge. In 1955, plans were announced for a 252-acre (102 ha) subdivision of private homes in the area. By 1958, however, only 15 homes had been constructed. That year the project was acquired by Aunt Hack Ridge Estates, Inc., which planned to build approximately 200 additional homes on the land. The company went on to develop hundreds of acres that now form the Aunt Hack neighborhood. Homes in the community were designed and built primarily by J. Burton Peeler.

In 1968, Irene Richter, widow of New York businessman Stanley L. Richter, donated the family's 230-acre (93 ha) West Lake Farm along Aunt Hack Road to the city of Danbury to create Richter Park. Stanley Richter had purchased the farm in 1937 and maintained it for the following 30 years. Immediately following the donation, the Richter Park Authority began making plans for the development of an 18-hole municipal golf course. The first nine holes opened for play in September 1971 and the full 18-hole course was completed three years later. In 1971, the Richter House, the couple’s former residence, became the home of the Stanley L. Richter Association for the Arts.

In the early 21st century, part of the former Union Carbide campus known as The Reserve was acquired by WCI Communities for development as Rivington, a master-planned residential community. Conceived as "the new American Village," the project was planned to include a village center with shops & restaurants and three distinct neighborhoods: The Hills, Encore, and The Village. Construction of The Hills began in 2006, but the project stalled when WCI filed for bankruptcy in 2008. At the time, The Hills was the only completed portion of the development. Toll Brothers acquired the property in 2010 and continued its development, creating additional neighborhoods including The Regency, The Woodlands, The Enclave, The Ridge, The Mews, and The Meadows.

== Geography ==
Located in the western part of Danbury, Mill Plain borders the town of Southeast. The area extends from the northern edge of Miry Brook at Lake Kenosia in the southeastern portion to King Street and Middle River in the north and northeast. The Mill Plain Road corridor, which includes portions of Lake Avenue Extension, serves as the primary commercial thoroughfare on Danbury's west side and runs roughly east to west through the area.

There are 190 acres (77 ha) of protected land in the Mill Plain area known as Farrington Woods (the former Isabelle Farrington property). Within this area is Sanford Pond, which forms the headwaters of the Still River.

Notable communities include the Aunt Hack neighborhood in the northern section, and the Rivington residential development in the southern section near the Ridgebury border.

== Parks and recreation ==
- Richter Park
- Farrington Woods
- Lake Kenosia Park

== Notable people ==
- Marian Anderson (1897-1993), contralto
- Ronnie Spector (1943-2022), singer
