= Danbury Public Schools =

School district in Connecticut, United States

Address
- 63 Beaver Brook Road Danbury, Connecticut, 6810; United States

District information
- Type: Public
- Grades: PreK–12
- NCES District ID: 0901020

Students and staff
- Students: 11,813
- Teachers: 845.7
- Staff: 924.29
- Student–teacher ratio: 13.97

Other information
- Website: www.danbury.k12.ct.us

Danbury Public Schools is a school district headquartered in Danbury, Connecticut.

Dr. Kara Casimiro is the current superintendent of Danbury Public Schools.

== Schools ==
High schools

- Danbury High School
- Danbury High School West

Middle schools

- Broadview Middle School
- Rogers Park Middle School
- Westside Middle School Academy

Elementary schools

- Western Connecticut Academy for International Studies Elementary Magnet School
- Ellsworth Avenue Elementary School
- Great Plain Elementary School
- Hayestown Elementary School
- King Street School
- Mill Ridge Primary School
- Morris Street
- Park Avenue
- Pembroke
- Shelter Rock
- South Street
- Stadley Rough

Preschool

- Early Childhood Center

Alternative schools

- Alternative Center for Excellence
- REACH/Endeavor

Adult education

- Western Connecticut Regional Adult Education (WERACE)
