= Jah Joyner =

American football player (born 2001)

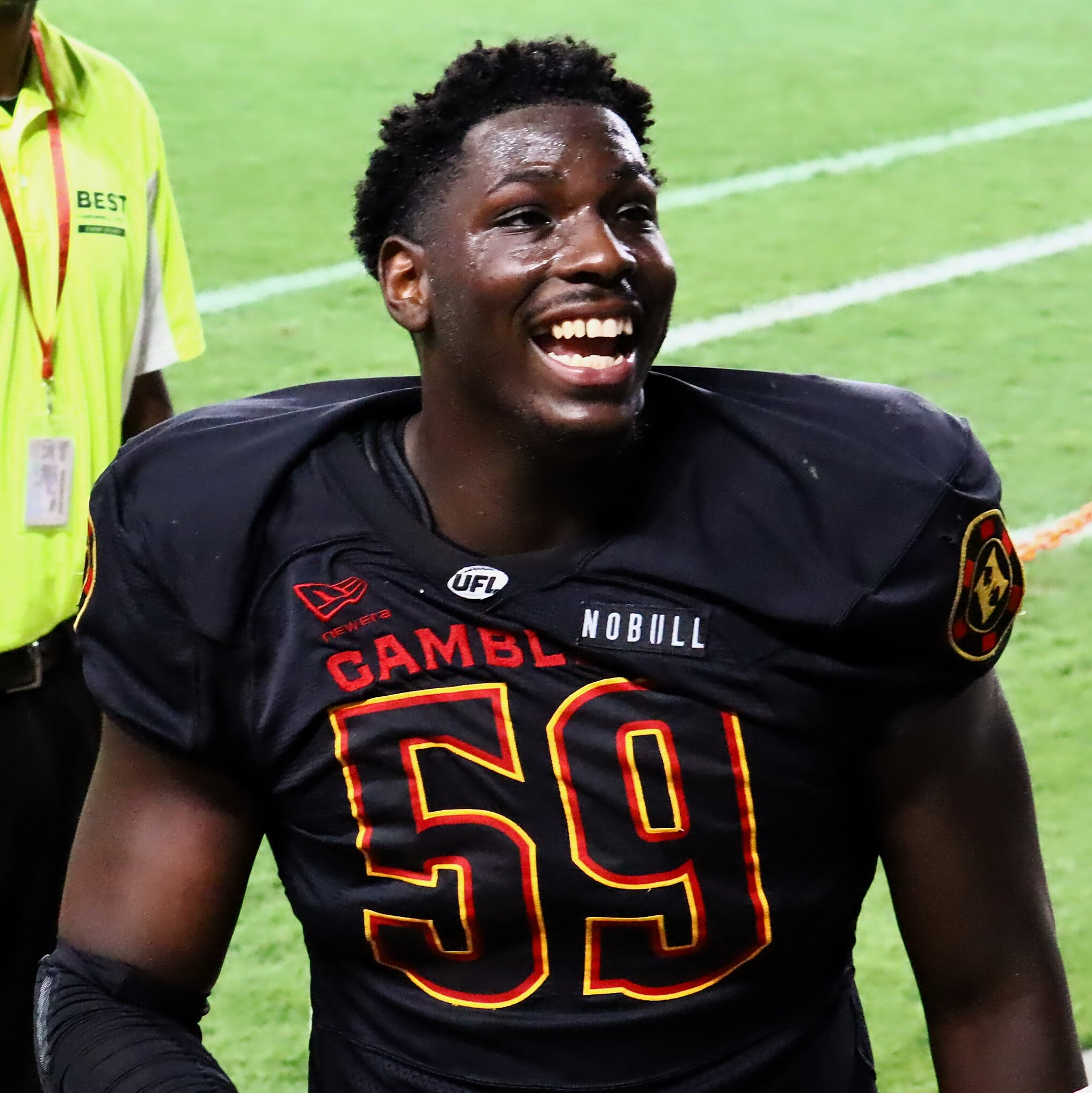
- Joyner with the Houston Gamblers in 2026

Profile
- Position: Defensive end

Personal information
- Born: July 30, 2001 (age 25); Danbury, Connecticut, U.S.
- Listed height: 6 ft 4 in (1.93 m)
- Listed weight: 261 lb (118 kg)

Career information
- High school: Danbury (CT)
- College: Minnesota (2020–2024)
- NFL draft: 2025: undrafted

Career history
- Las Vegas Raiders (2025)*; Dallas Renegades (2026)*; Houston Gamblers (2026); San Francisco 49ers (2026)*
- * Offseason or practice squad member only
- Stats at Pro Football Reference

Jah Joyner (born July 30, 2001) is an American professional football defensive end. He played college football for the Minnesota Golden Gophers.

== Early life ==
Joyner attended Danbury High School in Danbury, Connecticut. He had 13 sacks as a senior and 11 as a junior. He originally committed to play college football at Boston College University before changing to the University of Minnesota.

== College career ==
Joyner played in four games and had one sack his first two years at Minnesota and redshirted. As a redshirt sophomore in 2022, he played in 13 games and had 15 tackles and 1.5 sacks. As a redshirt junior in 2023, he played in all 13 games with one start and had 18 tackles and 7.5 sacks. Joyner returned to Minnesota in 2024.

== Professional career ==
Pre-draft measurables
| Height | Weight | Arm length | Hand span | Wingspan | 40-yard dash | 10-yard split | 20-yard split | 20-yard shuttle | Three-cone drill | Vertical jump | Bench press |
|---|---|---|---|---|---|---|---|---|---|---|---|
| 6 ft 4 1/4 in (1.94 m) | 262 lb (119 kg) | 34 in (0.86 m) | 9 3/8 in (0.24 m) | 6 ft 10 1/2 in (2.10 m) | 4.60 s | 1.67 s | 2.75 s | 4.55 s | 7.33 s | 30.0 in (0.76 m) | 22 reps |
All values from NFL Combine/Pro Day

=== Las Vegas Raiders ===
On May 9, 2025, Joyner signed with the Las Vegas Raiders as an undrafted free agent after going unselected in the 2025 NFL draft. He was waived by the Raiders on August 25.

=== Dallas Renegades ===
On January 13, 2026, Joyner was selected by the Dallas Renegades in the 2026 UFL Draft. He was released on March 19.

=== Houston Gamblers ===
On March 20, 2026, Joyner was claimed by the Houston Gamblers. He appeared in all ten games of the 2026 season for the Gamblers (eight starts), recording 28 total tackles (six for loss), one pass deflection, and half a sack.

=== San Francisco 49ers ===
On August 27, 2026, Joyner was signed by the San Francisco 49ers. He was waived three days later as a part of final roster cuts.
