= Mill Plain station =

Former rail station in Danbury, Connecticut, United States

Mill Plain
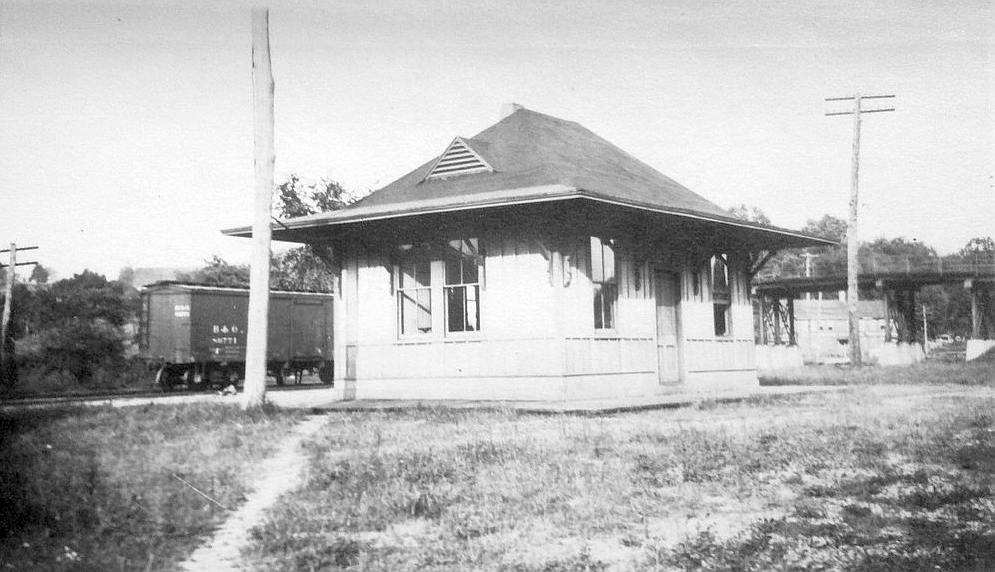
- 1916 valuation image of the 1881-built NY&NE station

General information
- Coordinates: 41.39341°N 73.51802°W

History
- Opened: 1881
- Closed: 1928
Location

Mill Plain was a station on the main line of the New York and New England Railroad and later the Maybrook Line of the New York, New Haven, and Hartford Railroad. Opened in 1881, the station was originally located in the Mill Plain area in the western part of Danbury, Connecticut. The station was closed in 1928 and served multiple purposes from 1930 until 2018. The station building was restored and moved to the Danbury Railway Museum in 2019.

== History ==
The station opened in 1881 to coincide with the expansion of the NY&NE line west to the Hudson River. Mill Plain station had a long, low-level side platform that connected it to an adjoining freight depot, which was also built in 1881. The line became a part of the Central New England Railway in 1918. The New York, New Haven, and Hartford Railroad acquired the line in 1927 and closed the station, and passenger service on the line the following year. From 1930 up until 2018, the station building served as a residence and later a golf cart repair shop. In 2018 the station building was bought by the Danbury Railway Museum and moved to their rail yard. The building is currently undergoing restoration.

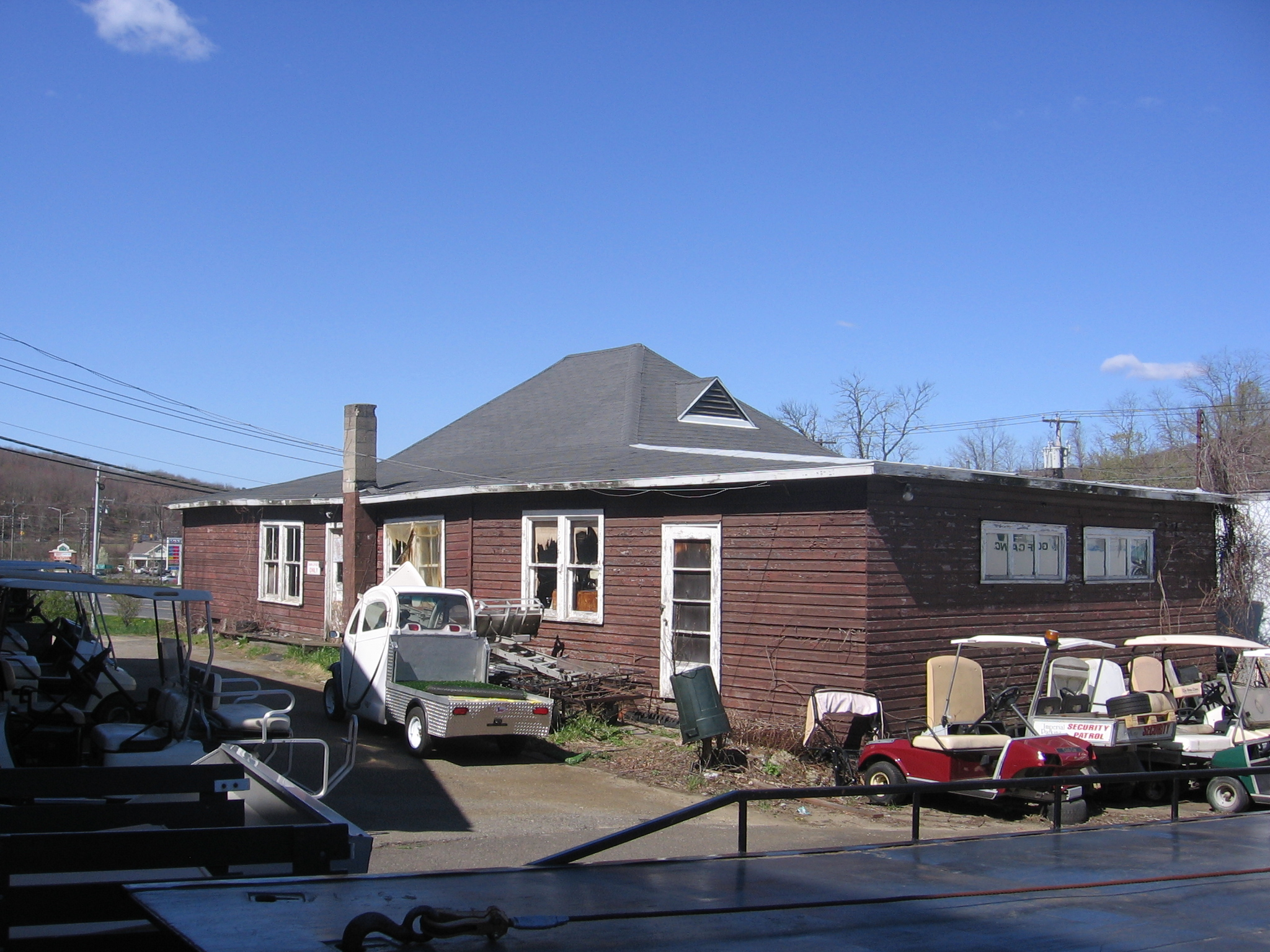
Station in 2012 prior to relocation

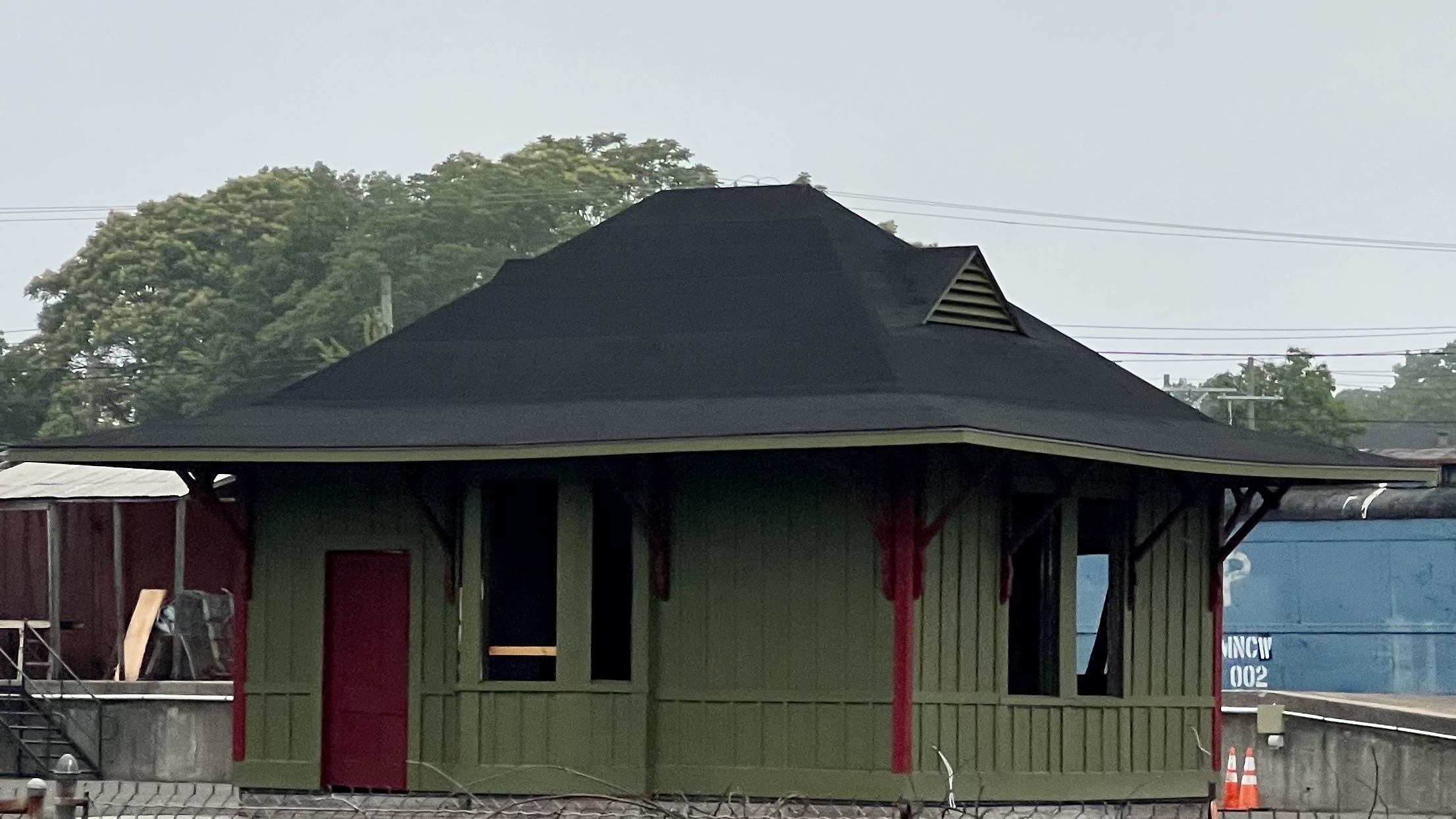
Station in 2023 during restoration
