= Joseph W. Pepin Memorial Building =

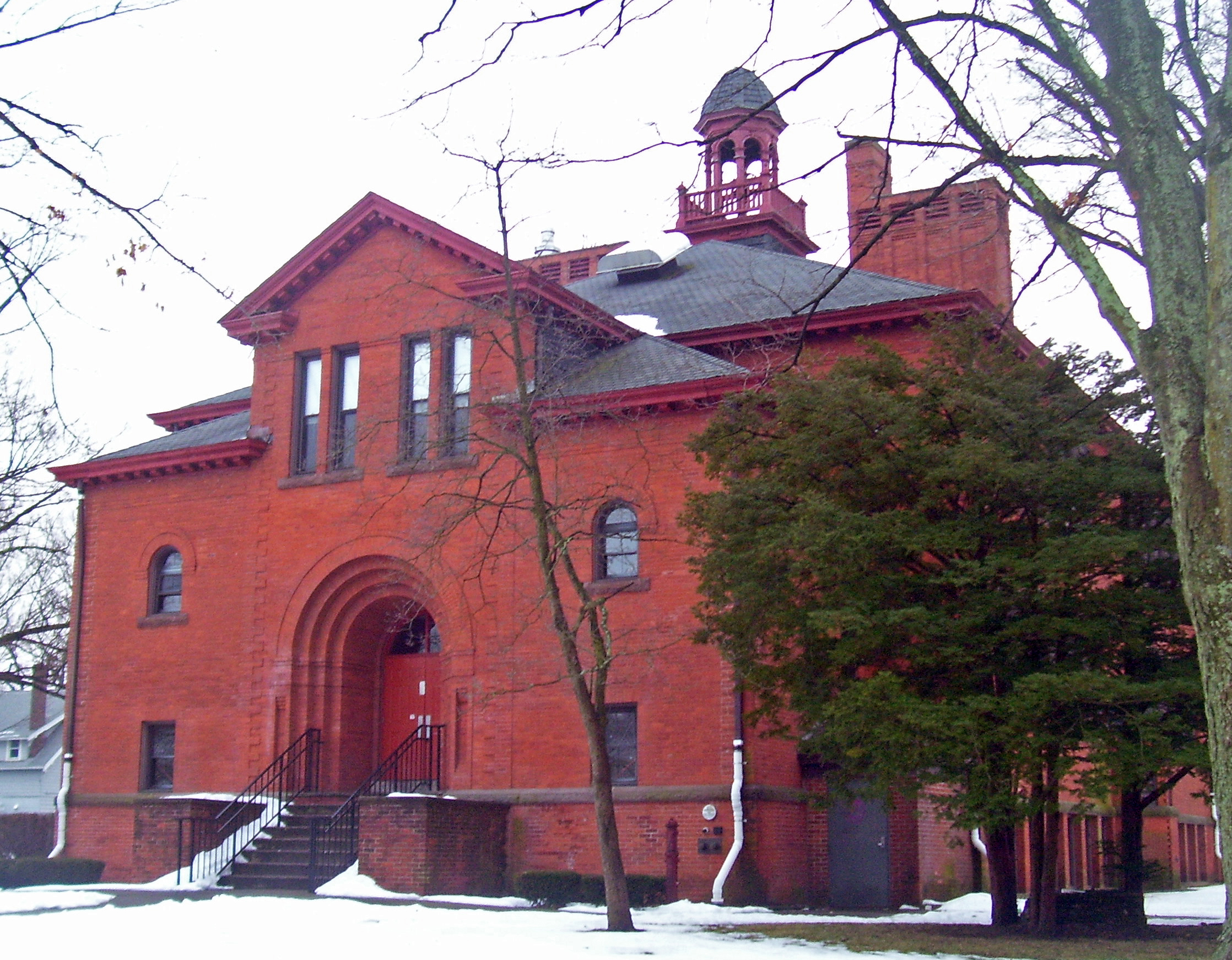
- East (front) elevation and north profile, 2008

Location
- 26 Locust Avenue; Danbury, Connecticut 06810; United States; 41°24′5″N 73°26′29″W

Information
- School type: Public Alternative high school
- Established: 1977
- School district: Danbury Public Schools
- Principal: John Webber
- Grades: 9-12
- Enrollment: 97 (2008)
- Student to teacher ratio: 10.8
- Campus size: 1.1 acres (4,500 m^{2})
- Campus type: Urban
- Communities served: Danbury
- Website: danbury.k12.ct.us/aceweb/ace
- Locust Avenue School
- U.S. National Register of Historic Places
- NRHP reference No.: 85001162
- Added to NRHP: May 30, 1985

The Joseph W. Pepin Memorial Building formally known as Alternative Center for Excellence (ACE) and the Alternative Center for Education, is located in the former Locust Avenue School at 26 Locust Avenue in Danbury, Connecticut, United States. It is an alternative high school within Danbury Public Schools, meant for at-risk students.

The building itself, a brick Romanesque Revival structure, was designed by architect Warren R. Briggs in 1896, and later featured in his book Modern American School Buildings. For many years it was an elementary school, and a laboratory school where recent graduates of the state's teacher training schools were sent to hone their skills with actual students before going to their ultimate teaching jobs.

Today it is the last nineteenth-century school building remaining in Danbury, and one of the few remaining laboratory school buildings in the state. It was listed on the National Register of Historic Places in 1985.

== Building ==
The school occupies a 1.1-acre (4,500 m^{2}) lot at the north end of the block formed by Locust, Ninth and Roberts avenues in an otherwise residential neighborhood. Western Connecticut State University, formerly the Danbury State Normal School where the teachers at the school were trained in its laboratory era, is a block to the west. Downtown Danbury is a mile (1.6 km) to the west-southwest, and Danbury Hospital is to the northwest along Locust.

The terrain is level. Paved parking lots abut the school on the south and west. The entire site is landscaped, with trees planted shortly after the school was opened to honor veterans of the Spanish–American War.

The building itself is a 60-by-86-foot (18 by 26 m) two-story structure of common bond orange-red brick on a raised basement topped by a slate-shingled hip roof. Modillioned galvanized sheet metal is along the eaves. At the top of the roof is an orange wooden cupola with octagonal rounded roof supported by round arches with keys and surrounded by a balustrade with chamfered newels and pointed finials. A stone water table runs around the building at the level of the top of the entrance steps.

On both east and west facades are a nearly identical projecting two-story pavilion with a central pediment with returns. The centrally located entrances, reached by a set of stone steps, are double doors in concentric recessed round arches. A projecting bay window on the west side, facing Roberts Avenue, is the only difference between the two.

Inside both entrances lead into vestibules with hooks for hanging coats. Four classrooms are on each floor, two on each side of the central hall, with three-foot (1 m) wainscoting of tongue and groove North Carolina pine. Partitions within the rooms are all brick. Each is lit by six tall windows and floored in pine similar to the wainscoting. The blackboards above the wainscoting have their original turned trim.

The supporting beams in the ceilings are exposed. They are reinforced at the joints by cast iron columns with decorative floral bases. Also exposed along the upper walls are the copper heating pipes with their original brass fittings run; spaces in the ceiling above that originally helped to ventilate the building have been boarded over to comply with modern fire codes.

In the basement, designed to be fully functional, windows provide similar natural illumination. Brick partitions are pierced with rounded arches, and large brick piers with corbeled tops support the ceiling. The walls are decorated with student artwork. The cooking facilities, sink and bathroom stalls are all original. The original 1894 Gurney furnace remains in operation to supplement the modern furnace.

== History ==
The Town of Danbury, which at that time was in charge of education, built the school in response to growing population on the city's eastern fringe following the subdivision of the former White Farm in that area. Development on Locust Avenue took off, complemented by new streets like Ninth Avenue. Children in the area had to walk a long distance to the Balmforth Street School. Architect Warren Briggs had already designed a sister school on Morris Street on the other side of the city.

His design, with Romanesque Revival touches, incorporated his advanced ideas on school construction, primarily that school buildings should be visually appealing. Classrooms were arranged so that the abundant natural light came over the student's left shoulder. The ventilation and high ceilings kept them airy as well as bright, with space for classes of 50–60 students as was common at the time. The basement was meant to be used as a play space when weather outside was not suitable. In 1899 the Locust Avenue School was one of Briggs' featured designs in his Modern American School Buildings.

The Danbury Building Company constructed the new school for $23,000 ($890,000 in contemporary dollars). After a short delay, students began their spring term there in April 1896. The 150 first and second graders had previously attended either Liberty Street or Balmforth. The school's first graduating class planted the trees in honor of veterans of the recent Spanish–American War.

Within a decade, in 1905, administration was transferred to the nearby Danbury State Normal School (now Western Connecticut State University. Students there were required to teach, observe or manage for two weeks of the school year at either Locust Avenue or the one-room King Street School in the city's northwestern corner. Over time other Danbury schools were included as well, but Locust Avenue remained one of them.

The state's Department of Education continued to staff the school, and the Town of Danbury to maintain it, until 1965. In that year city and town governments were consolidated and control of the school was turned over to the Danbury Board of Education. It continued to be used as an elementary school until 1976. By that time, all of the other schools Danbury had built in the 19th century had been demolished. Statewide, only two other laboratory schools, in New Haven and New Britain, remain.

The next year, 1977, it was reused as what was originally known as the Alternative Center for Education, a program for at-risk students. A few years later, the building's heating, cooling and ventilation systems, the first of which had been converted from coal to oil in the 1920s, were upgraded to comply with modern building codes. There have been few other changes to the building in its lifetime.

== Program ==
The Alternative Center for Excellence keeps class sizes low, with a student-teacher ratio of about 10:1. Approximately a hundred students are in the program in each year. They are divided into nine guidance groups, with each teacher responsible for about ten students.

Applicants come for a two-day visit, submit three letters of recommendation and do 15 hours of community service. Afterwards, they are interviewed along with their parents by students and staff. They must demonstrate to the program's satisfaction that they are willing to attend school regularly and devote themselves to academic improvement.

Over 500 students have completed the program since it was inaugurated. They must meet Danbury High School's graduation requirements, and receive a diploma from it. They attend both the high school's graduation ceremonies as well as ACE's.

The school's location has been considered a factor in its success. It is a short walk from both the commercial areas on White Street, where many students work after school, and Ellsworth Avenue School, where many serve as reading tutors. For these reasons the program has remained at the Locust Avenue building, helping to preserve it.

== See also ==
- National Register of Historic Places listings in Fairfield County, Connecticut
