= Danbury High School =

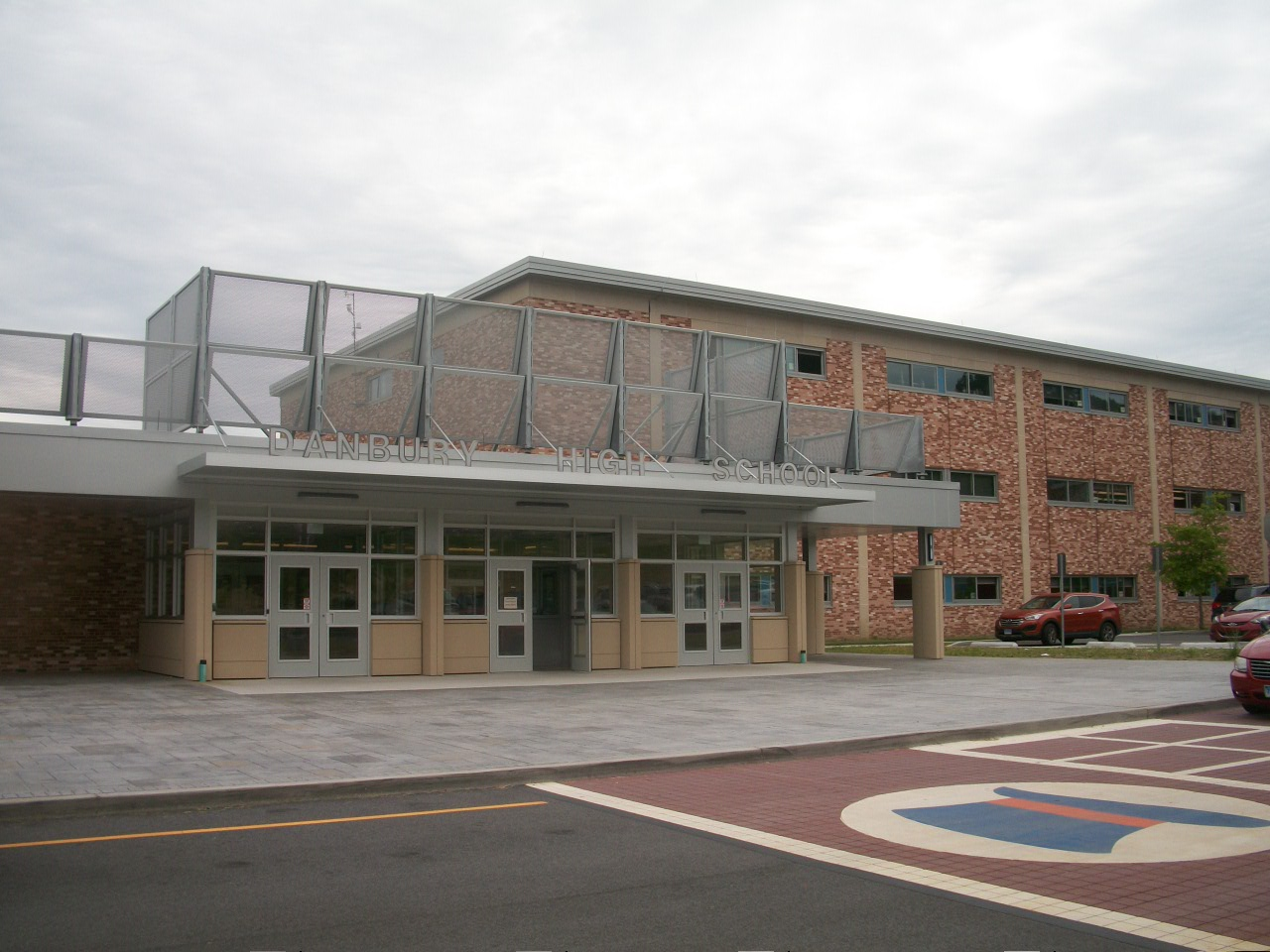
- The newly renovated front entrance of Danbury High School, opened in 2018.

Location
- 43 Clapboard Ridge Road; Danbury, Connecticut 06811; United States; 41°24′59″N 73°28′13″W

Information
- Type: Public
- Established: 1906 (120 years ago)
- School district: Danbury School District
- CEEB code: 070120
- Principal: Dan Donovan
- Teaching staff: 230.00 (FTE)
- Grades: 9th–12th
- Enrollment: 3,612 (2024-2025)
- Student to teacher ratio: 15.70
- Colors: Blue and orange
- Mascot: Hatter
- Website: dhs.danbury.k12.ct.us

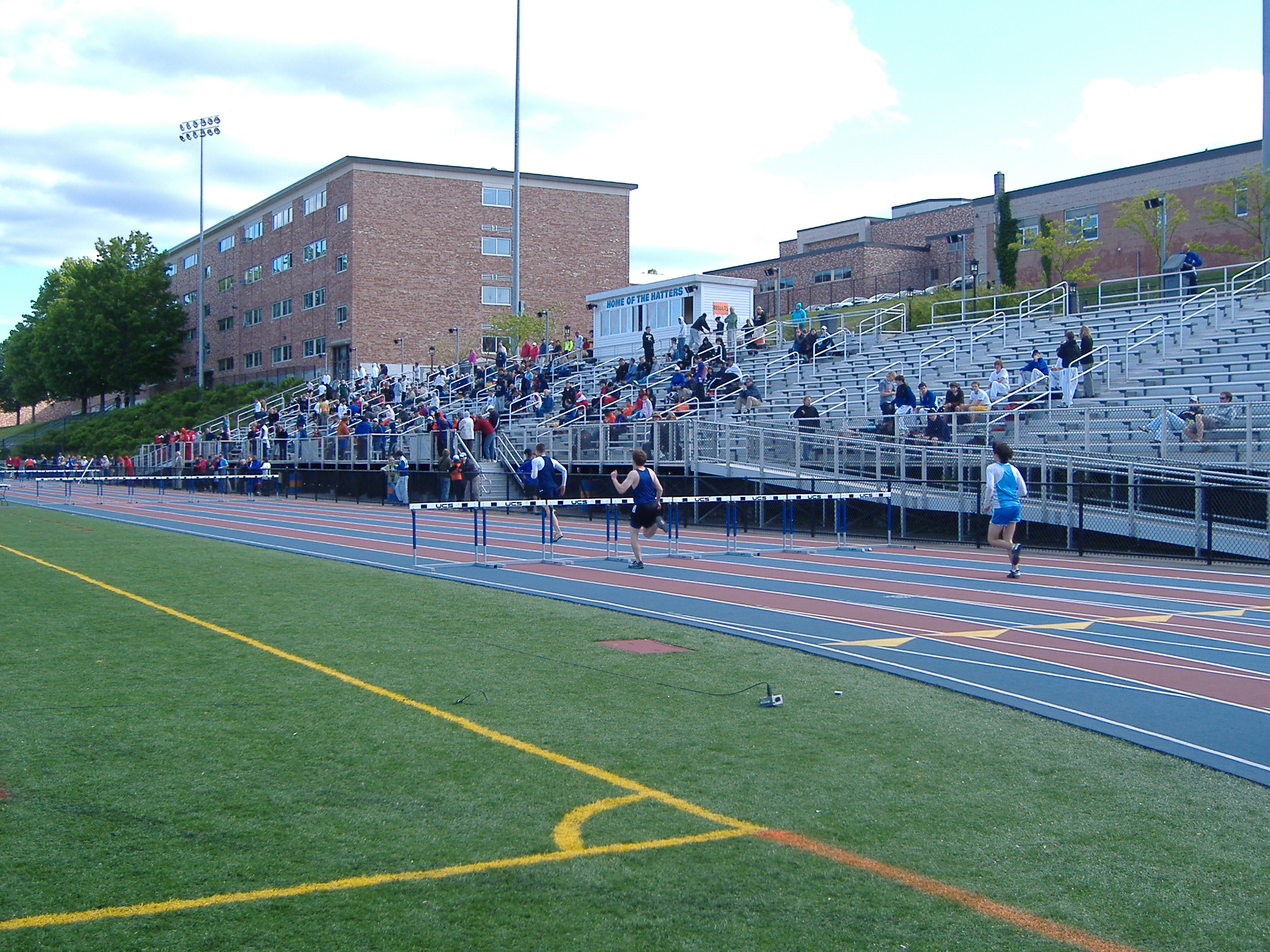
Athletic facilities at Danbury High School.

Danbury High School is a public high school in Danbury, Connecticut, with almost 4000 students. It is part of the Danbury Public Schools district. Despite Danbury's population of 86,518 (as of 2020), there was only one public high school until 2025, along with several small private schools, and one vocational high school in the city. The school is located in a suburban, residential neighborhood atop a hill that overlooks most of the city. It is the largest high school in the state of Connecticut.

Danbury High School is supplemented by a magnet program called the Alternative Center for Excellence. This program provides a Danbury High School diploma but exhibits additional criteria not required by most local institutions.

In 2013, Danbury High School was awarded $100,000 after winning the State Farm Insurance "Celebrate My Drive" campaign. The "Celebrate My Drive" campaign encourages teens to make positive choices as they start driving.

Danbury High School was awarded a total of $40,000 after 2 student's projects won the statewide contest Voice4Change. These projects were to contribute to the water fountains and teacher's faculty lounge furniture at DHS.

== History ==
Discussion of founding a high school in Danbury took place in the 1860s, and the school began operation before 1878. In 1927, a new high school was built on 181 White Street in Danbury. This building served as the city's main high school, until a rapid increase in Danbury's population compelled a major school construction program. In 1965, a new Danbury High School was dedicated on Clapboard Ridge. This campus is still the current location of the school today. On October 11, 1967 rock band The Doors performed live at the school.

== Academic progress and school improvement ==
Since 2015, freshman students entering Danbury High School will have an opportunity to earn an associate degree simultaneously with their high school diploma. As part of the Early College Opportunity program, 80 to 100 incoming freshmen students will begin their journey toward an associate degree in information technology issued by Naugatuck Valley Community College.

In 2022, the Danbury Board of Education and district leadership approved plans for an additional high school campus to alleviate overcrowding. The new campus, now known as Danbury High School West, is scheduled to open for the 2025–26 school year.

== Stadium ==
Danbury High School has a multi-purpose stadium complex, constructed in 2002, that can accommodate close to 4,000 spectators. The field surface is Astroplay brand filled field turf that can be used in all types of weather. It also features a seven-pole Universal Sports Lighting system, an electronic remote-controlled scoreboard, and heated concession building with bathrooms. The track is an eight-lane Mondo Limited Super X Surface. In the summer of 2015, the Astroplay surface of the multi-purpose lighted field was replaced with a brand-new more grass-like artificial turf.

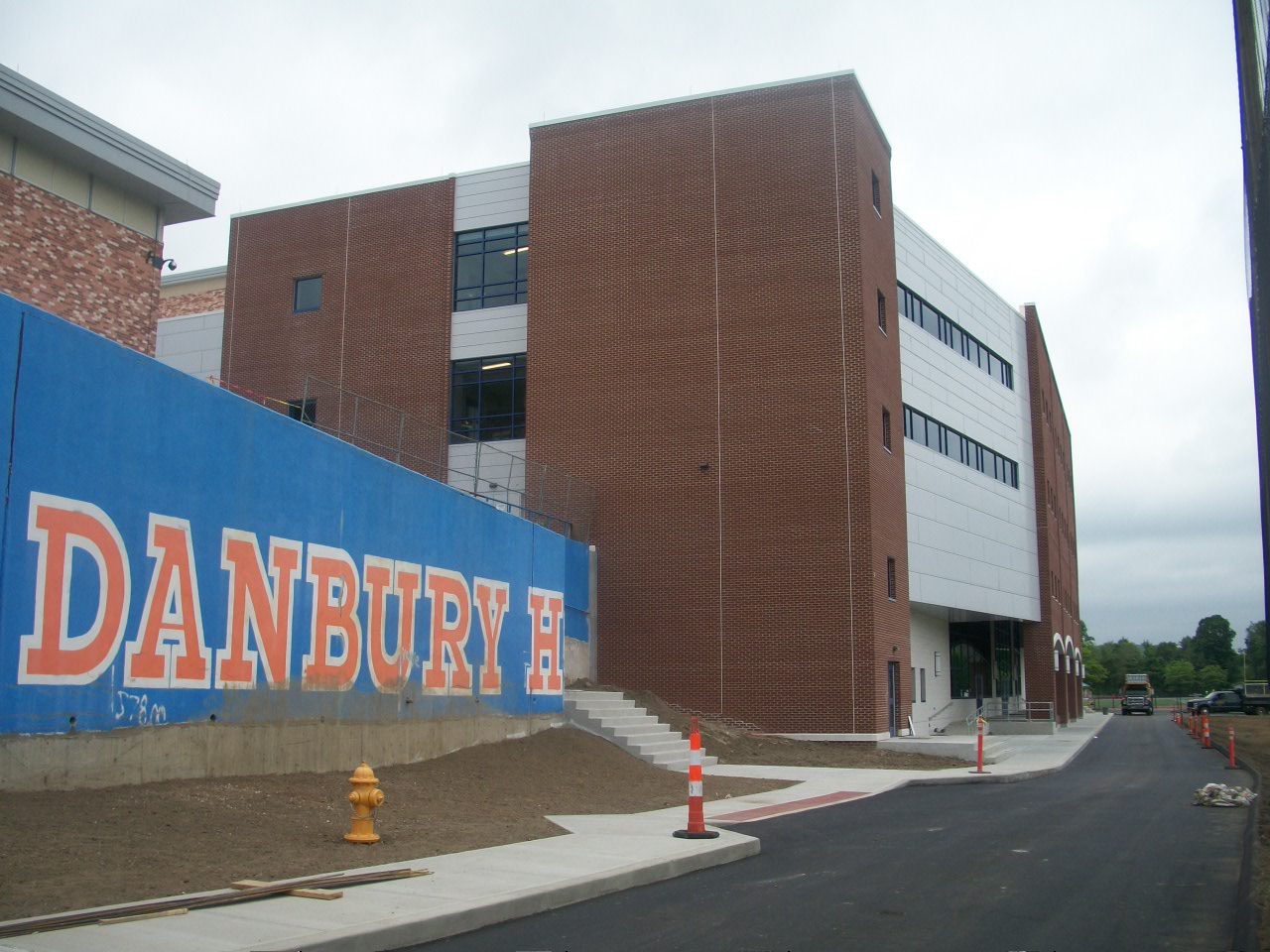
The latest addition to Danbury High School, G Building

== Media appearances ==
Danbury High School has been featured on TruTV's The Principal's Office.

== Notable alumni ==
- Austin Calitro (born 1994), NFL player
- Ken Green (born 1958), PGA Golf Professional with 5 Tour wins
- Peter Hylenski (born 1975–1976), Tony Award-winning sound designer
- Jah Joyner, college football player
- George Radachowsky (born 1962), NFL player
- William R. Ratchford (1934–2011), former U.S. Representative from Connecticut
- Allen Ritter (born 1988), record producer, songwriter, pianist and singer
- Perry Rotella (born 1963), IT executive and businessman
- James A. Ryan (1867–1956), U.S. Army brigadier general
- Robert Joseph Shaheen (1937–2017), clergyman of the Maronite Catholic Church
