= Still River (Housatonic River tributary) =

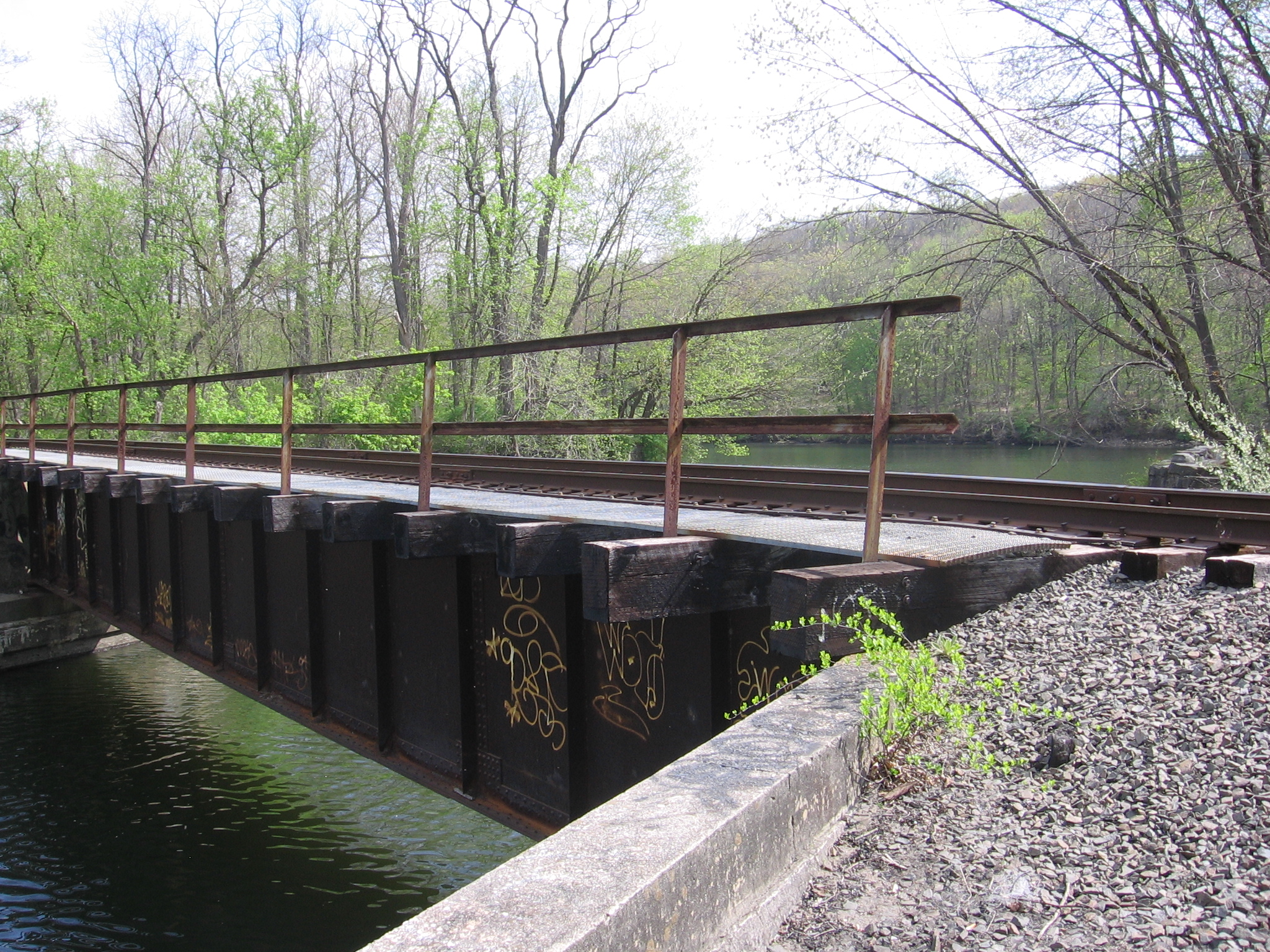
- Mouth of the Still River is traversed by a bridge that carries the Housatonic Railroad near Lovers Leap State Park

Location
- Country: United States
- State: Connecticut
- County: Fairfield
- Cities: Danbury
- Towns: Brookfield, New Milford

Physical characteristics
- Source
  - location: Farrington's Pond
  - coordinates: 41.4043°N 73.5379°W
  - elevation: 225 m (738 ft)
- Mouth
  - location: New Milford
  - coordinates: 41.5457°N 73.4085°W
  - elevation: 106 m (348 ft)
- Length: 25.4 mi (40.9 km)
- Basin size: 85 mi^{2} (220 km^{2})

Basin features
- River system: Housatonic River

The Still River is a 25.4-mile-long (40.9 km) tributary to the Housatonic River in western Connecticut.

== Course and watershed ==
The Still River headwaters emanate from Farrington's Pond at the New York border with Danbury, Connecticut. It meanders through Sanfords Pond and Lake Kenosia before entering a concrete aqueduct near downtown Danbury. It then turns north, becoming a more conventional river as it cuts through Brookfield and southern New Milford before joining with the Housatonic. The river has a drainage area of 85 square miles, and a mean flow of 377 cubic feet per second.

The Still River has a brief but impactful history that has influenced its condition today. The farming industry in Danbury led to extreme pollution in the river. Beginning around the 1860s, the river again experienced significant mercury pollution from the hatting industry that continued for several years. This pollution had both ecological and anthropogenic effects on the surrounding environment, eventually leading to a need for remediation and cleanup.

== History ==
Even before the hatting industry began in the late 1700s, the Still River was known as a dead river. This was due to pollution from farms in the area surrounding Danbury. Farmers used the river as a site to get rid of waste and other toxic debris. Historical documents from Danbury and surrounding towns cited the river as a sewage dump around the 1880s, and the water was unusable for both agricultural and industrial use. It wasn't until a court case ruling] in 1895, along with the Clean Water Act in 1972 that the city of Danbury was required to take responsibility for the state of the river. In 1993, Danbury constructed a new sewage treatment plant to help improve water quality. In 2014, the Still River Partners was created with the hopes of rebuilding the watershed, and as of 2019, this group is still responsible for maintaining and improving the river.

== Pollution ==
Mercury nitrate was discharged to the river by the hatting industry from circa 1860 through the first half of the 1900s. The hat factories used the chemical in the felt making process to remove animal fur from pelts. During this time, levels of mercury were found to be 5-10 ppm with extremes up to 100 ppm. These levels were about 500 times higher than background levels. Although the hatting industry was the main cause of mercury pollution, there were other industries that contributed as well. The P. Robinson Fur Cutting Company was a fur removal company sited on the Still River.

During the peak of the hatting industry, mercury pollution transported via the river's current into the Housatonic River, and into the Long Island Sound.

The mercury pollution was detrimental to the river's life and the surrounding ecosystems, and didn't start to fully rebound until the construction of the sewage treatment plant. Many species of fish can now be found, and kayak ramps have been installed downriver from Danbury.

== Cleanup and remediation ==
Several organizations have an interest in preserving the Still River and its watershed. Spearheaded by Danbury's Health Department, the Still River Alliance was organized in 1995 as a consortium of three different groups. Coordinated by the Housatonic Valley Association and with funding from Connecticut Department of Energy and Environmental Protection, key stakeholders and municipalities formed the Still River Partners group and launched an EPA approved watershed planning process to improve the water quality of the Still River, activities which are still active today.

== Development and conservation ==
The Housatonic Valley Economic Development Partnership is striving to develop a 38-mile (61 km) River Trail on the Still and Housatonic rivers for canoeing and kayaking. They periodically organize river clean-ups, using paid contractors and volunteers, to clear debris from the river. They also lobby for kayak put-in/out ramps. The beginning of the trail is located behind the Marriott Courtyard hotel, just off of Route 84 (Exit 8) in Danbury. Rapids interrupt the river trail in Brookfield (no portage is available), and three dams across the Housatonic require portages along the way to Long Island Sound.

The Still River Preserve in Brookfield covers about 80 acres (32 ha) adjacent to the river. The preserve is owned by Weantinoge Heritage Land Trust of New Milford, Connecticut.

The city of Danbury has a $4.85 million bonding package, approved in a February 2008 referendum, for use in building recreational projects on city-owned land. A list of potential projects was prepared. It includes completing the native plant hedgerow at Lake Kenosia (part of the Still River, west of the city) and doing a feasibility study to build a boardwalk and bird-watching site on about 20 acres (8.1 ha) the city owns in Mill Plain Swamp (Lake Kenosia discharges into the swamp, which drains into the Still River). A separate $6.6 million bonding package, approved in the same referendum, could be used to purchase Sanford's Pond and building a trail through it.

== See also ==
- List of rivers in Connecticut
- List of rivers in New York
- Still River Greenway
