= Mill Plain, Fairfield, Connecticut =

Census-designated place in Connecticut, United States

Mill Plain, Connecticut
- Census-designated place
- Location within Connecticut Location within the United States
- Coordinates: 41°9′0″N 73°16′9″W
- Country: United States
- State: Connecticut
- County: Fairfield
- Town: Fairfield

Area
  - Total: 0.51 sq mi (1.31 km^{2})
  - Land: 0.49 sq mi (1.26 km^{2})
  - Water: 0.019 sq mi (0.05 km^{2})
- Elevation: 25 ft (7.6 m)
- Time zone: UTC-5 (Eastern (EST))
  - Summer (DST): UTC-4 (EDT)
- ZIP Code: 06824 (Fairfield)
- Area codes: 203/475
- FIPS code: 09-47990
- GNIS feature ID: 2805956

Mill Plain is a census-designated place (CDP) in the town of Fairfield, Fairfield County, Connecticut, United States. It is in the southern part of the town, directly north of the downtown area of Fairfield and northeast of Southport. It is bordered to the west by the Mill River, to the south by Interstate 95, to the east by Mill Plain Road, and to the north by Duck Farm Road.

Mill Plain was first listed as a CDP prior to the 2020 census.
