= Lake Kenosia =

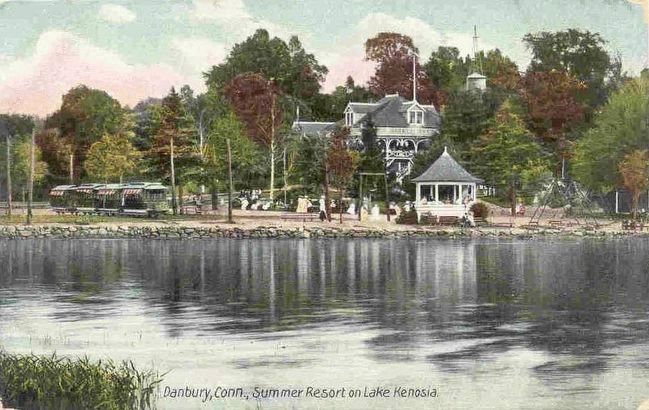
- Summer resort on Lake Kenosia (1908)

- Location within Connecticut Location within the United States
- Location: Danbury, Connecticut
- Coordinates: 41°22′59″N 73°29′57″W
- Type: Lake
- Surface area: 59.5 acres (24.1 ha)
- Surface elevation: 146 ft (45 m)

Interactive map of Lake Kenosia

Lake Kenosia is a lake located in Danbury, Connecticut, United States. The lake covers 59.5 acres (24.1 ha).

== History ==
The lake was originally called Mill Plain Pond because the dam of a nearby mill had flooded the swamp located there.

In 1860, a resort hotel called the Kenosia Hotel opened at the lake. It was destroyed by fire the same year.

In the late 1800s, the Danbury and Bethel Street Railway, which owned the shortest electrified trolley system in Connecticut, purchased 12 acres (4.9 ha) of land on Lake Kenosia to build an amusement park. The company extended their trolley line to the lake, and opened Lake Kenosia Amusement Park in 1895. The park featured a wooden roller coaster, a carousel, a 1,000 seat open-air performance center, and the three-story Kenmere Resort Hotel. A 30-seat steamboat called Montgomery was brought to the lake, where it became "problematic because it was far too big for Lake Kenosia". Fire destroyed the hotel in 1927, and the park's popularity diminished following the opening of Candlewood Lake in the 1920s.

In 2016, drought conditions caused Danbury's water reservoirs to approach "critically low levels", and the city was permitted to temporarily draw water from Lake Kenosia.

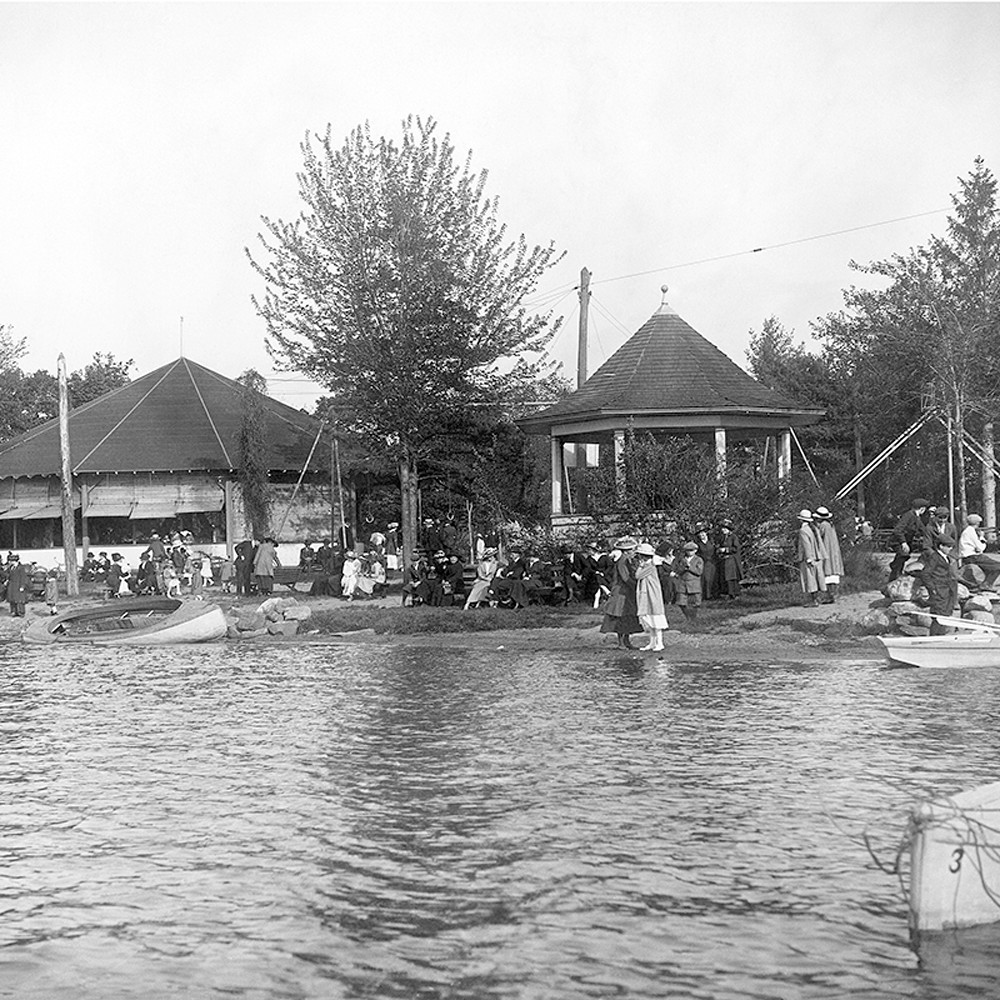
Late 1800s

== Recreation ==
Lake Kenosia Park is a 25-acre (10 ha) park located on the north side of the lake, with a playground, benches and soccer fields. Parking is available, and there is a boat launch for non-motorized boats. Swimming in not permitted in Lake Kenosia.
