= Charles Parks =

Charles or Charlie Parks may refer to:

- Charles Parks (sculptor) (1922–2012), American sculptor
- Charles Parks (basketball) (born 1946), American basketball player
- Charlie Parks (Canadian football) (born 2004), Canadian gridiron football player
- Charles Darling Parks (1869–1929), American manufacturer
- Charlie Parks (baseball) (1917–1987), American Negro league catcher

== See also ==
- Charles V. Park (1885–1982), American librarian
- Charles Parker (disambiguation)
