= Admiral Parker =

Admiral Parker may refer to:

- Sir Charles Parker, 5th Baronet (1792–1869), British Royal Navy admiral
- Edward N. Parker (1904–1989), U.S. Navy vice admiral
- George Parker (Royal Navy officer) (1767–1847), British Royal Navy admiral
- Henry Parker (Royal Navy officer) (born 1963), British Royal Navy rear admiral
- Sir Hyde Parker, 5th Baronet (1714–1782), British Royal Navy vice admiral
- Hyde Parker (Royal Navy officer, born 1739) (1739–1807), British Royal Navy admiral
- Hyde Parker (Royal Navy officer, born 1784) (1784–1854), British Royal Navy vice admiral
- Sir Peter Parker, 1st Baronet (1721–1811), British Royal Navy admiral
- Robert C. Parker (born 1957), U.S. Coast Guard rear admiral
- Sir William Parker, 1st Baronet, of Harburn (1743–1802), British Royal Navy admiral
- Sir William Parker, 1st Baronet, of Shenstone (1781–1866), British Royal Navy admiral

== See also ==
- Foxhall A. Parker Sr. (1788–1857), U.S. Navy commodore, prior to institution of the rank of admiral
- Foxhall A. Parker Jr. (1821–1879), U.S. Navy commodore, prior to institution of the rank of admiral
- James P. Parker (1855–1942), U.S. Navy commodore
