= Our Lady of Peace Shrine =

Catholic Shrine In Santa Clara, California

Coordinates: 37.38931°N 121.97729°W

Our Lady of Peace
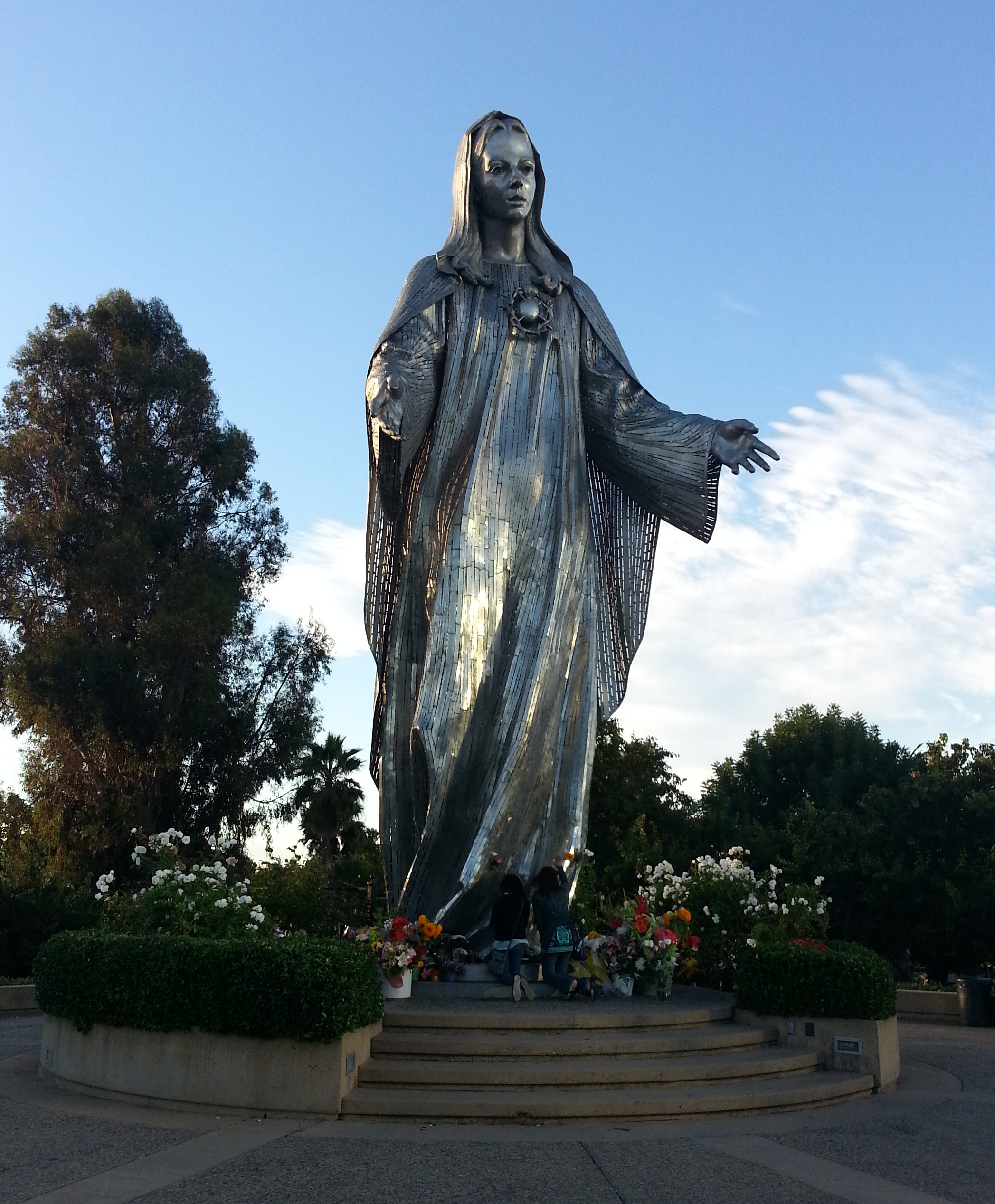

Religion
- Affiliation: Roman Catholic
- Ecclesiastical or organisational status: Marian shrine

Location
- Location: Santa Clara, California
- Interactive map of Our Lady of Peace

Architecture
- Architect: Charles Parks
- Groundbreaking: 1982
- Completed: 1983

Website
- www.olop-shrine.org

Our Lady of Peace Shrine, also known as the Immaculate Heart of Mary Shrine, is a Roman Catholic shrine and landmark of the Diocese of San José, located in Santa Clara, California. The most notable feature of the parish is the 32-foot statue of Mary, Mother of Jesus.

== History ==
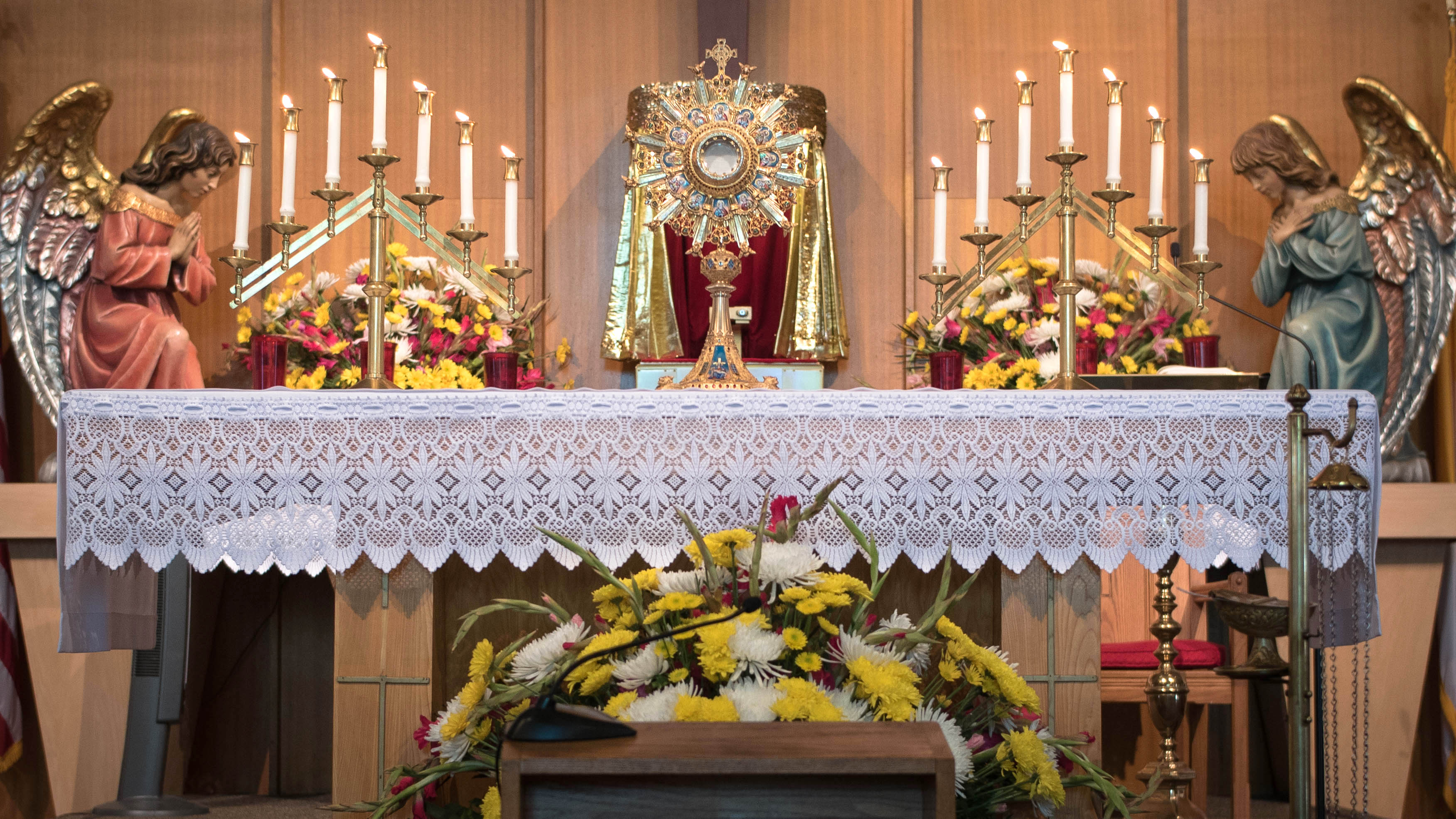
The altar at Our Lady of Peace Church. Since 1976, Eucharistic adoration is in progress at Our Lady of Peace Church 24-hours a day, 365 days a year, unless the Holy Mass is being celebrated.

Our Lady of Peace church was founded on June 24, 1961. Fr. Joseph G. Sullivan, the founding pastor, oversaw construction of the church, hall, and rectory. In 1969, the Archbishop McGucken of San Francisco asked Fr. Sullivan to transfer to another parish in need of his leadership, and sent Fr. John Joseph Sweeny to serve as pastor at Our Lady of Peace Church. This was the beginning of Fr. Sweeny's 32-year stay as pastor of Our Lady of Peace Church.

In the late 1960s as proposed city planning developed in the city of Santa Clara, Fr. Sweeny recognized the church's strategic location as an opportunity for spiritual outreach to the already-increasing population. He also envisioned a shrine to Mary, the Mother of God, as a “forthright expression of faith” for the times. As he explained, “What child hasn’t responded to the open arms of a mother? Even the adult, if we take time to think back a little bit to our first experiences—experiences of trust, the open arms of a mother—I guess there’s nothing more endearing, and it is next to God.” Drawn to the Shrine by the welcoming statue of Our Lady of the Immaculate Heart, he hoped visitors would then visit the church. In 1976, Fr. Sweeny and a team of supporters established 24-hour Eucharistic adoration. Since then, the church has remained open round-the-clock for prayer.

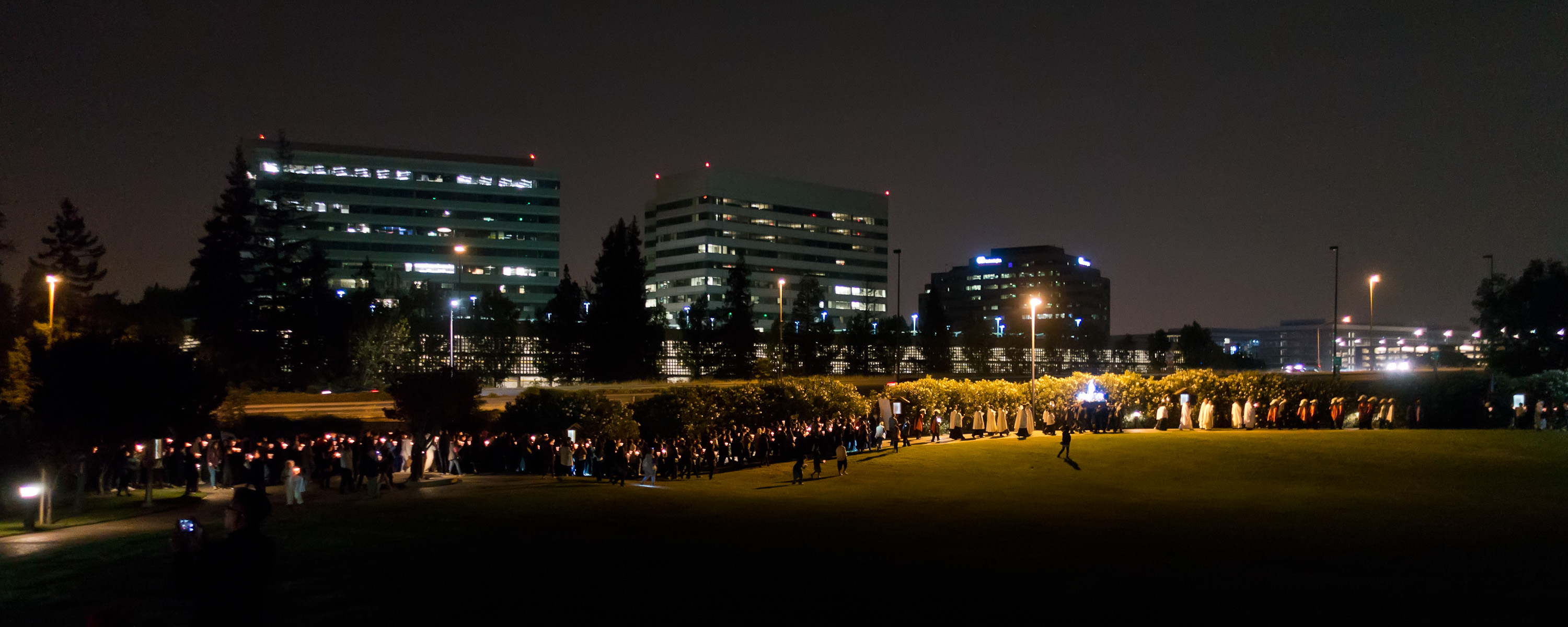
Candlelight rosary procession at Our Lady of Peace Shrine

Establishing the Shrine and creating the statue proved to be more complicated. To support this endeavor, Fr. Sweeny solicited prayers (one million rosaries); though he never asked for funds, approximately 3,500 faithful who shared his dream for the shrine began to mail in unsolicited donations, totaling over $340,000.

In 1976, Fr. Sweeny contracted Charles Parks to construct the 32-foot steel Madonna. He was introduced to Parks via a friend who saw his work at an exhibit in San Francisco. Fr. Sweeny had envisioned a 90-foot statue before paring it down to its final height. The statue required over 12 thousand hours of work and 50 thousand weldings, while Parks had to demolish part of his Wilmington, Delaware, studio to make room for sculpting. Bruce Industrial Co. assisted in building the statue. It was cast from stainless steel, the Madonna's robe being strips cut in a manner that made it look like it was moving.

Upon completion in 1982, it was erected at the Roman Catholic Archdiocese of Philadelphia's Cathedral Basilica of Saints Peter and Paul for the winter. Once the weather cleared, it traveled across the country and displayed in multiple cities for several months before arriving by flatbed truck at Our Lady of Peace in 1983; due to the statue's size, including its 15-foot wingspan, the Diocese proposed transporting it by military plane before deciding on an 80-foot truck that carried it on double lanes and needed a formal escort. On October 7, 1983, the Feast of the Holy Rosary, Bishop Pierre DuMaine of the Diocese of San Jose dedicated the statue and Shrine to the Immaculate Heart of Mary. Fr. Patrick Peyton of the Rosary Crusade was present for the dedication.

In 1996, a Family Learning Center was built to accommodate the increasing attendance and request for faith-based activities, yet space continues to be a constraint to the present day.

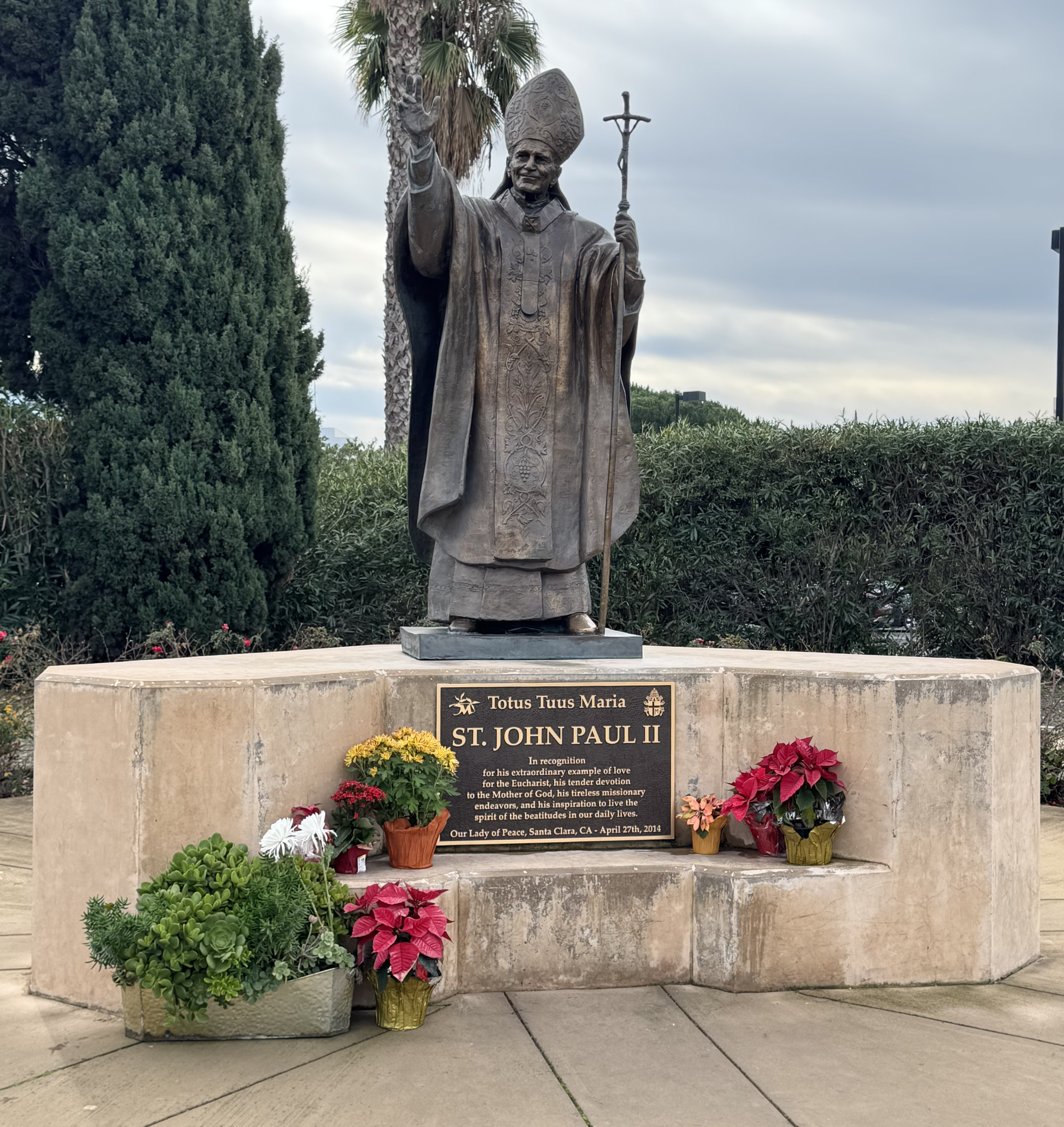
Statue of Pope John Paul II

In 2002, Pope John Paul II thanked Fr. Sweeny for his leadership and recognized him as a Prelate of Honor, addressing him as Monsignor Sweeny. Later that year, Bishop McGrath asked Monsignor Sweeny to retire (due to health concerns) and invited the priests of the Institute of the Incarnate Word (IVE) to assume pastoral leadership at Our Lady of Peace. They continue to staff a flourishing church and shrine today, supported by the Servants of the Lord and the Virgin of Matara (SSVM or “Servidoras”), the feminine branch of the IVE.

On Divine Mercy Sunday, April 27, 2014, Bishop McGrath dedicated a seven-foot bronze statue to the canonized John Paul II, directly across from the statue of Mary.

== Priests ==
Priest	Years of service	Role	Ordination
Fr. Joseph G. Sullivan	June 24, 1961 – 1969	Pastor (founding)	
Fr. John Joseph Sweeny	1969–2000	Pastor	1948 St Mary's Cathedral San Francisco by Archbishop John Joseph Mitty
Fr. Walter Mallo, IVE	2002–2010	Pastor	
Fr. Jose Giunta, IVE	2010–2013	Pastor	
Fr. Gustavo Nieto, IVE	2013 – August 2016	Pastor	
Rev. Brian Dinkel, IVE	December 4, 2016 – present	Pastor	

== See also ==
- Shrines to the Virgin Mary
- Roman Catholic Diocese of San José
