= Charles W. Parker =

Charles W. Parker may refer to:

- Charles William Parker (1912–1997), clergyman and politician in British Columbia, Canada
- Charles Wolcott Parker (1862–1948), judge in New Jersey, United States
- C. W. Parker (1864–1932), carousel manufacturer and carnival producer from Kansas, United States

== See also ==
- Charles Parker (disambiguation)
