= Blazer =

Striped or bright, solid-color informal jacket

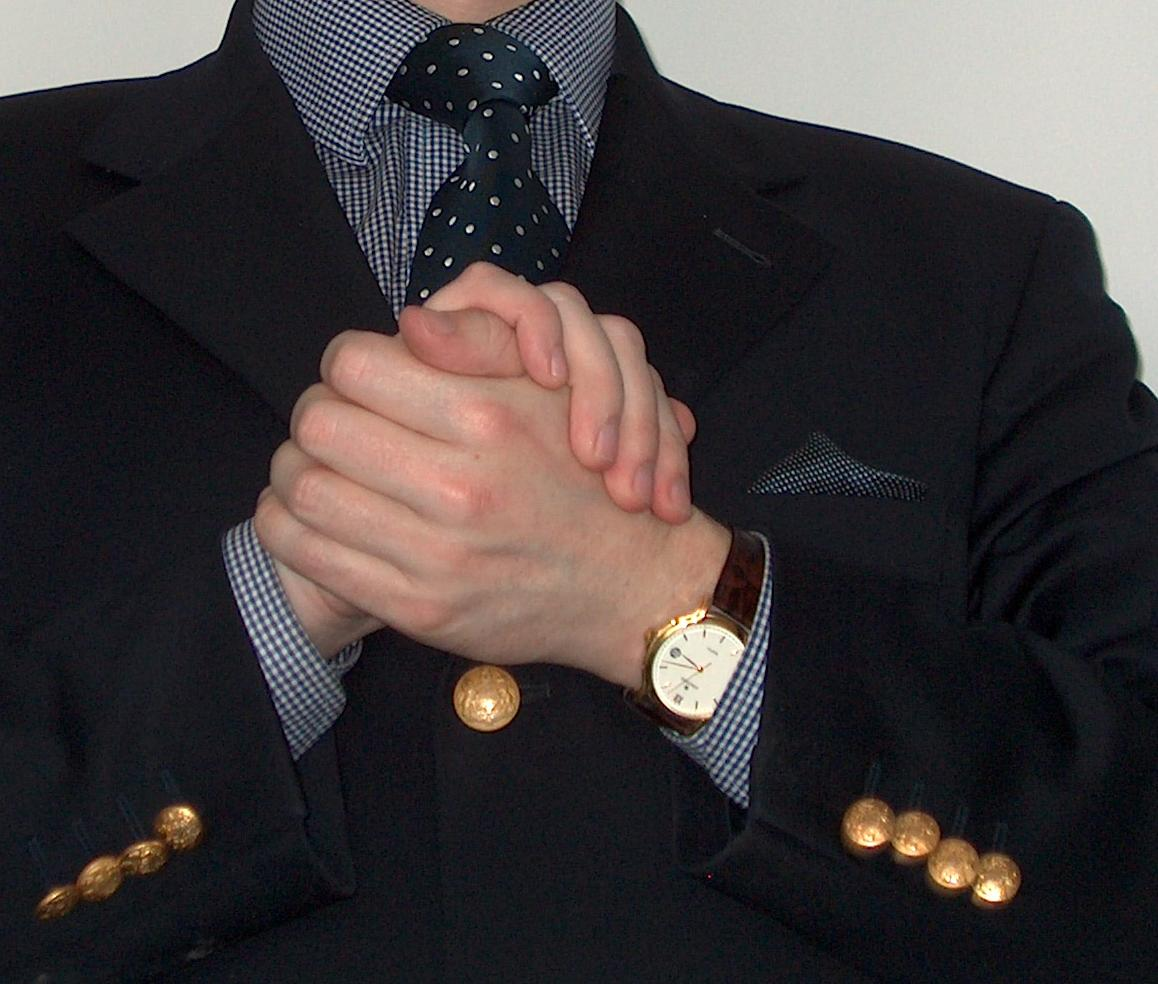
A single-breasted, reefer-style, navy blue blazer, dressed with brass buttons

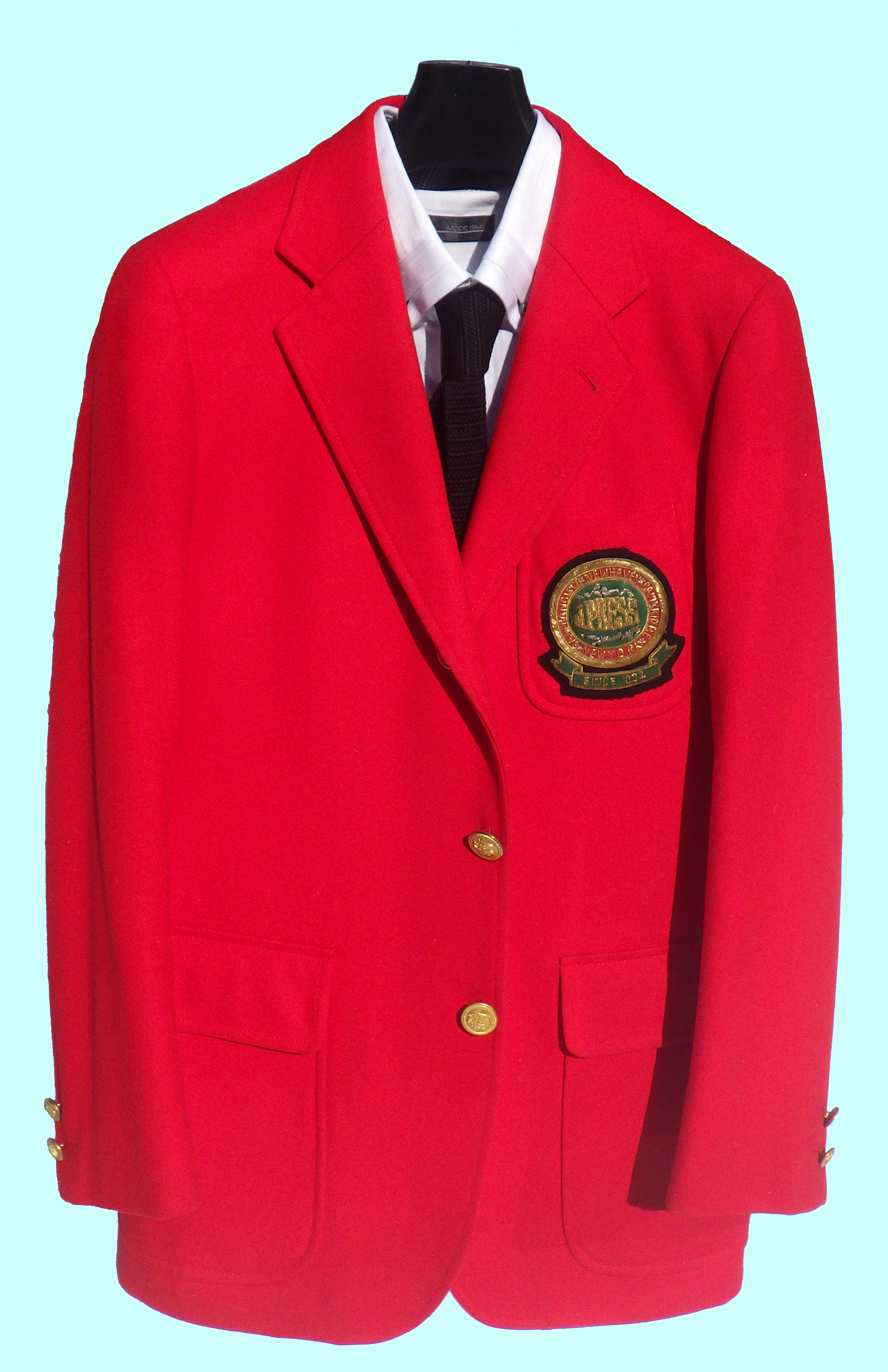
A patch logo blazer from historic Ivy style retailer J. Press

A blazer is a distinct type of lightweight sports jacket, traditionally made of navy or striped wool or linen. It is typically characterised by metal buttons on the front and sleeves. In terms of formality within Western dress codes, a blazer has a dressier appearance than other sports jackets, yet is seen as less formal than a suit jacket.

First introduced in the 1860s as a scarlet jacket in club or plain colours for boating or cricket, it began to shed its sporting associations in the 1930s. The double-breasted navy version in particular established itself as a staple of classic style, occupying a space between the casual tweed jacket and the formal dark suit, and soon became linked to the lifestyle of wealthy elites. Coloured variants, however, continue to appear in some circles as semi-active sportswear, notably after cricket or rowing.

A "nautical blazer" is defined as a double-breasted navy jacket with naval-style metal buttons, traditionally gold and sometimes silver. "Rowing" or "cricket blazers" are characterised by brightly coloured stripes and a breast-pocket badge denoting club or college affiliation. Other variations, often with a contrasting piping along notched lapels, are worn in more formal settings such as the presentation of cups or medals.

Blazers are also commonly worn as part of uniforms, for instance by airline employees, school pupils, sports clubs, and competitive teams.

== Wear ==
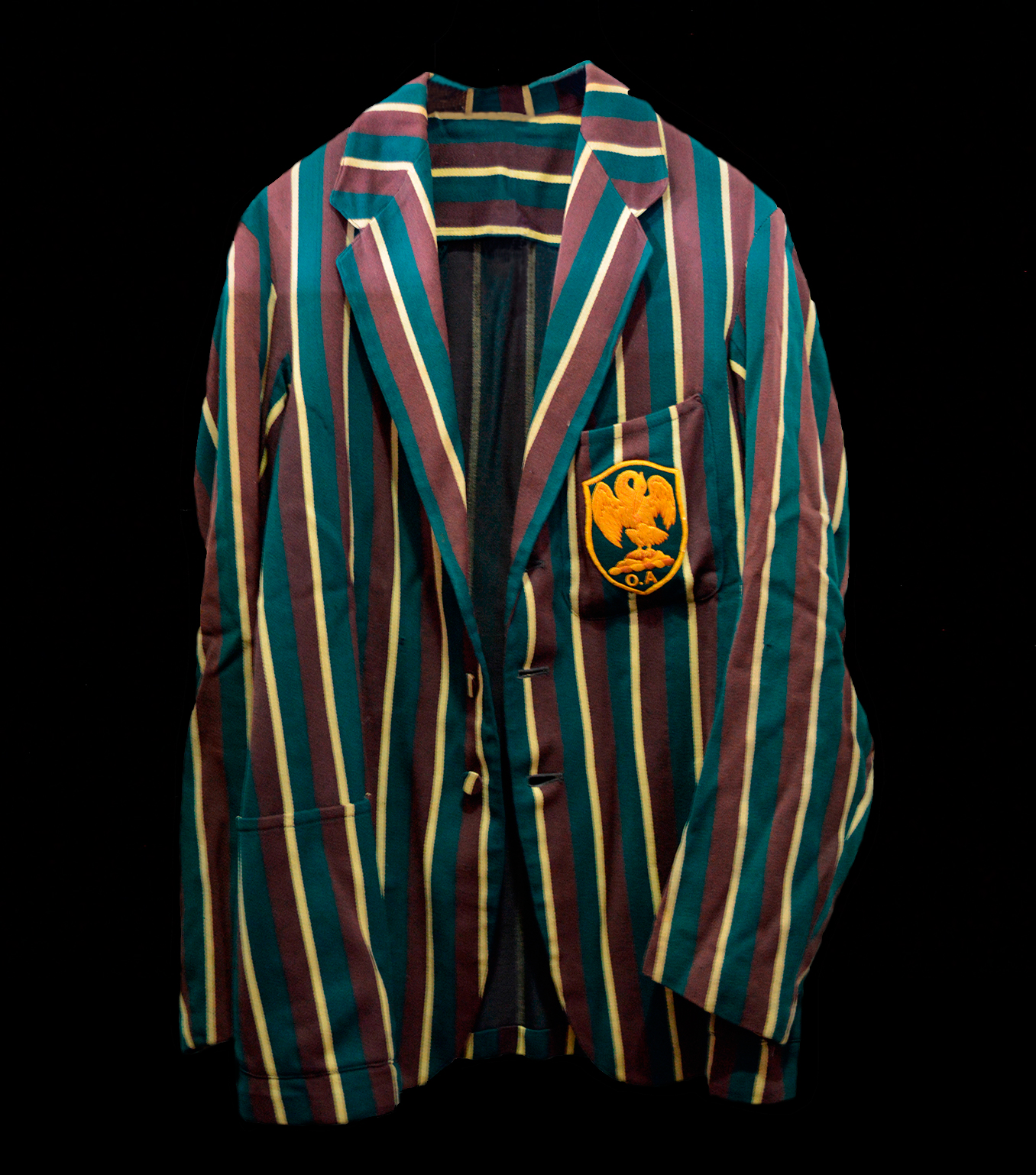
1919 striped old boy blazer of former Ardingly College pupils in school colors with embroidered pelican and "O.A" meaning "Old Ardinian"

Blazers are worn with a wide variety of clothes, ranging from a dress shirt and necktie to an open-necked polo shirt, or even just a plain t-shirt. They are seen with trousers of all colours and fabrics, from the classic white cotton or linen, to grey flannel, to brown or beige chinos, and also jeans.

A fitted, classically cut, double-breasted navy blue blazer with navy-style buttons is a popular design and sometimes referred to as a "reefer" blazer. Particularly in North America and the UK, it is often used in business casual attire.

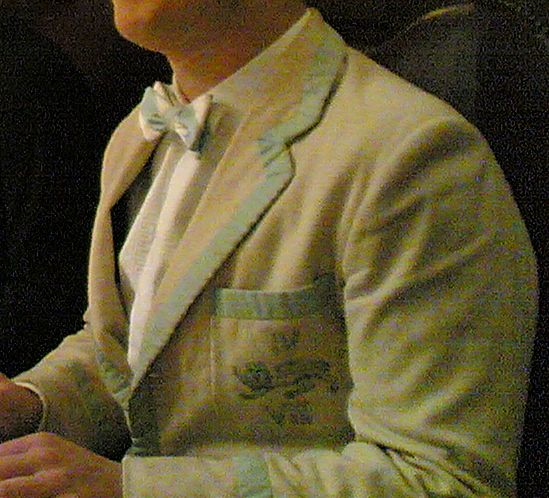
A Cambridge University Rifle Association half-blue blazer

Blazers, in a wide range of colours, are worn as part of school uniforms by many schools across the Commonwealth, and are still daily wear for most uniformed pupils in Britain, Ireland, Australia, New Zealand and South Africa. These are blazers in the traditional sense: single-breasted, and often of bright colours or with piping. This style is also worn by some boat clubs, such as those in Cambridge or Oxford, with the piped version used only on special occasions such as a boat club dinner. In this case, the piping is in college colours, and college buttons are worn. This traditional style can be seen in many feature films set in the Edwardian era, such as Kind Hearts and Coronets.

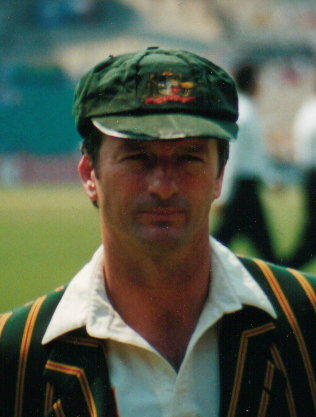
Australian cricketer Steve Waugh wearing baggy green cricket cap and striped, college-style blazer in Australia's national colours

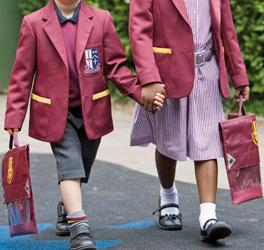
Blazers are worn for Bishop Challoner School uniform

Where the blazer is part of the dress of a school, college, sports club, or armed service regimental association (veterans' organization), it is normal for a badge to be sewn to the breast pocket. In schools, this badge may vary according to the pupil's standing in the school: being a member of the junior or senior school, being a prefect, or having been awarded colours in recognition of particular achievement in some academic or sporting field. In the Commonwealth, many regimental associations wear "regimental blazers" which also sport a similar badge on the breast pocket, usually in the form of a wire badge, and sometimes also regimental blazer buttons.

In the British Army, officers do not normally wear badges on their blazers (or boating jackets). Two regimental blazers will rarely be the same, as they are sourced from different civilian suppliers and are not issued by any authority. This results from the fact that the members of the association are no longer serving personnel, but civilians, though still retaining the bond that the badge represents. The standard colour is navy blue, although in some associations different colours are worn, such as rifle green for the associations of rifle regiments.

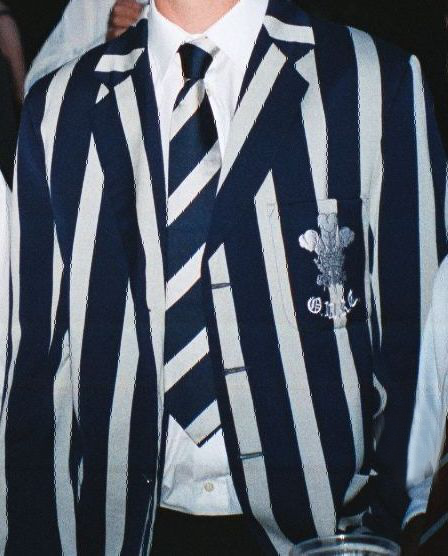
Oxford University Rifle Club Half Blue blazer and tie

Blazers, once commonly worn playing or attending traditional "gentlemen's sports", persist in only some games now, such as occasional use by tennis players, or in cricket, where in professional matches, such as international test matches, it is considered customary for the captain to wear a blazer with the team's logo or national coat of arms on the breast pocket—at least during the coin toss at the beginning of the match.

Two sporting events where blazers signify victory are the Congressional Cup Regatta, at the Long Beach Yacht Club, California, and the Masters golf tournament, held in Augusta, Georgia. The former event awards a crimson blazer to the winner of the regatta, while the latter awards a green blazer to the winner of the Masters.

== History ==
The sartorial term blazer originally referred to the bright red boating jackets worn by members of the Lady Margaret Boat Club (founded 1825), the rowing club of St. John's College in Cambridge.

Walter Wren, a writer to the London Daily News (22 August 1889) commented that "In your article of to-day … you speak of 'a striped red and black blazer', 'the blazer', also of 'the pale toned' ones. … A blazer is the red flannel boating jacket worn by the Lady Margaret, St. John's College, Cambridge, Boat Club. When I was at Cambridge it meant that and nothing else. It seems from your article that a blazer now means a coloured flannel jacket, whether for cricket, tennis, boating, or seaside wear."

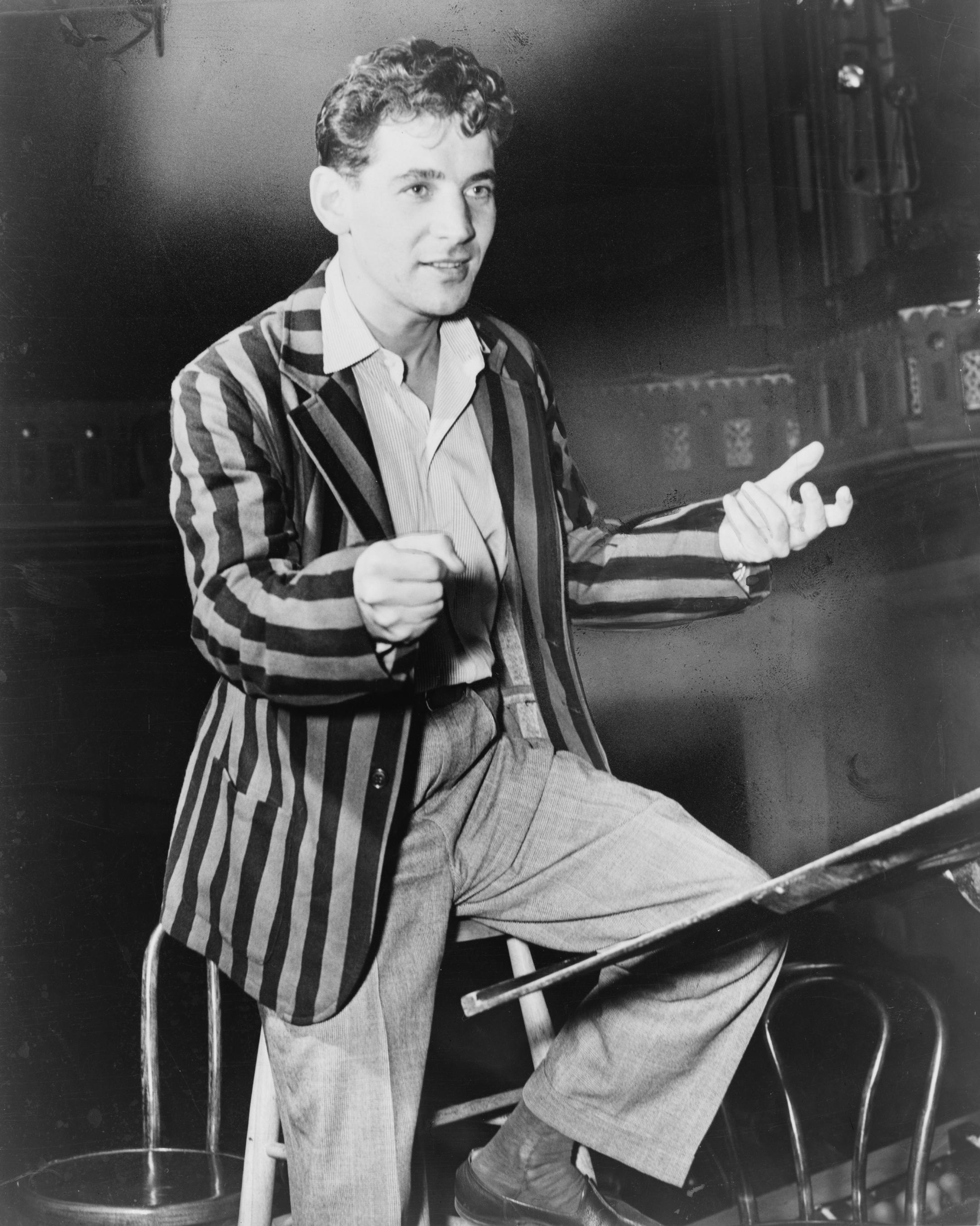
A rowing blazer worn by Leonard Bernstein

These early blazers were like later sports jackets, but this term has never referred to blazers, instead describing jackets derived from the later innovation of wearing odd jackets for land-based sports. Assertions that the name is derived from HMS Blazer are not borne out by contemporary sources, although it is reported that before the standardization of uniform in the Royal Navy, the crew of HMS Blazer wore "striped blue and white jackets", apparently in response to the sailors of HMS Harlequin being turned out in harlequin suits. As late as 1837 the gig's crew of HMS Blazer were dressed by their Captain in jackets of blue and white stripes and it is from this that the word blazer, meaning a striped jacket, has entered the language. The reefer jacket of naval origin, described the short double-breasted jacket worn by sailors in harsh weather, while performing duties such as reefing the sails. It is the descendants of these jackets that are now commonly referred by the term blazer. Originally featuring black horn buttons, these jackets evolved into the modern dark blazer, now available in both single and double-breasted styles, often with metallic buttons.

Metallic buttons are now a common detail in blazers

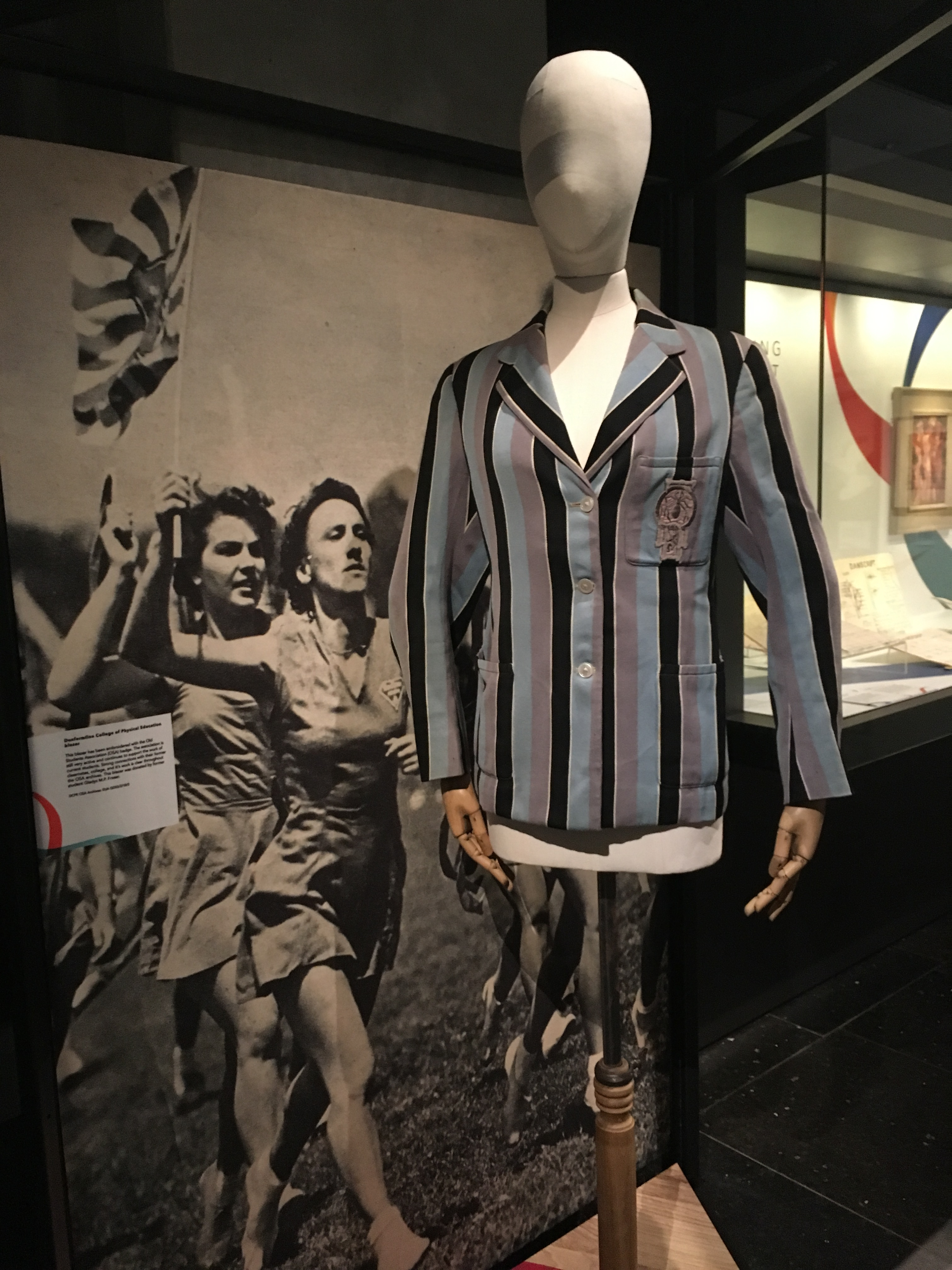
A striped blazer from Dunfermline College of Physical Education

Striped blazers became popular among British Mods in the early 1960s, and again during the Mod revival of the late 1970s – particularly in three-colour thick/thin stripe combinations, with three-button single-breasted front, five- or six-inch side or centre vents, and cuffs with multiple buttons. Various photos from 1964 and 1965 show London mods in boating blazers. Photos of mod icons the Who from 1964 (as the High Numbers) variously show Pete Townshend, Keith Moon and John Entwistle wearing boating blazers.

Another mod band, Small Faces, and other bands liked by mods – such as the Rolling Stones, the Beatles, the Kinks, Georgie Fame and the Blue Flames, the Animals, the Yardbirds, the Moody Blues, and the Troggs – had band members wearing striped blazers/boating jackets, or later, brightly coloured blazers with wide white or other light edging. These later blazers often had non-metal buttons, sometimes in the same colour as the edging. The earlier style of striped blazers can be seen in the film Quadrophenia. The later, bright, style of blazer was affectionately adopted by Austin Powers as part of his Swinging-London look.

By the late 2000s the blazer had been adopted as a popular fashion trend amongst women, often having shorter lengths, rolled-up sleeves, various lapels and bright colours.

== See also ==
- Sport coat
- Suit
