= Charles Darling Parks =

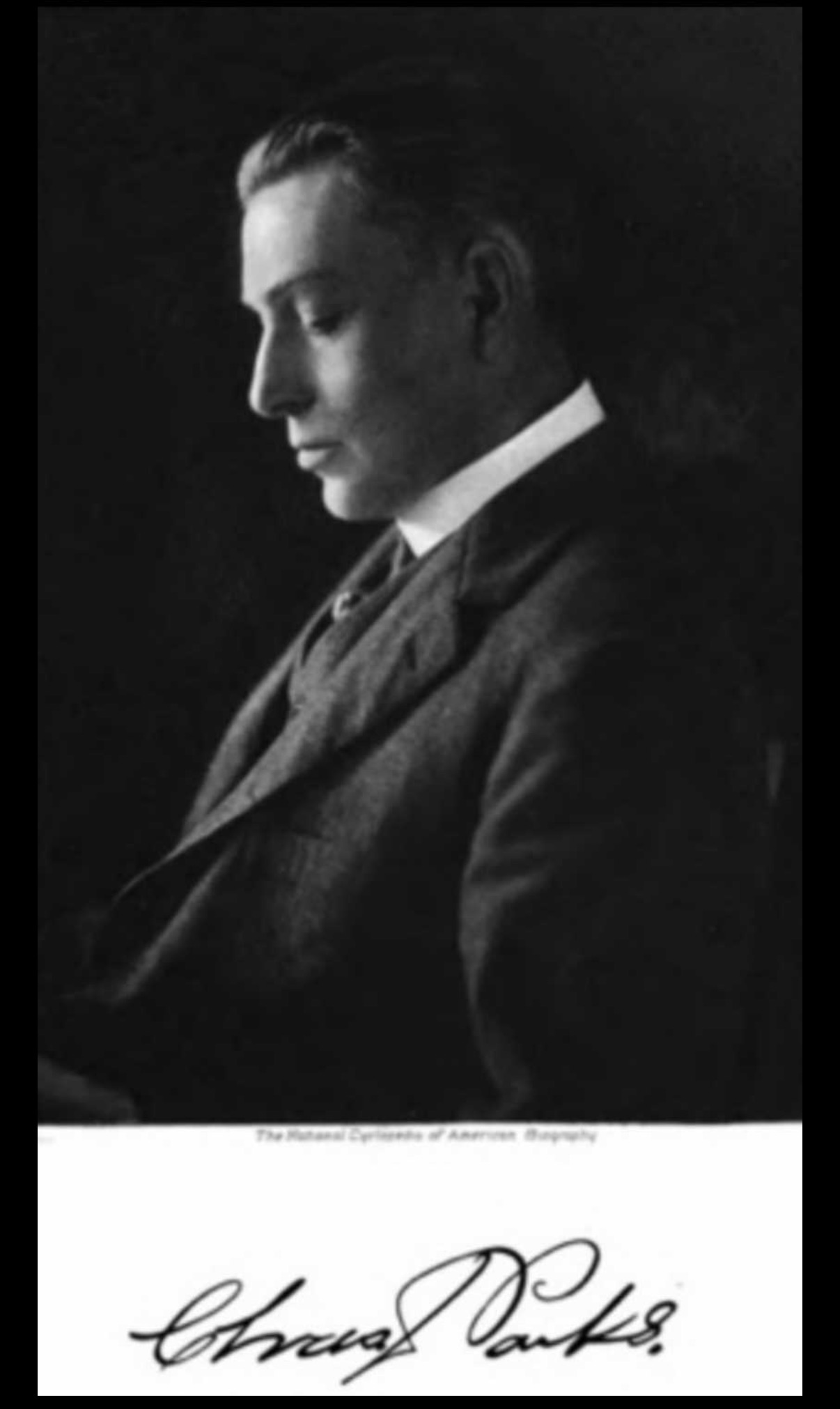

Charles Darling Parks (August 5, 1869, in New Brunswick, New Jersey – September 14, 1929, in Danbury, Connecticut) was a Hatting manufacturer.

== Early life ==
He was the son of Frederick Hiram and Louise (Price) Parks. Parks was orphaned at an early age, and lived with relatives in Brooklyn, New York, Rochelle, Illinois and Danbury, Connecticut, acquiring his early education in various schools.

He began his business career in 1888 as a dealer of hides and tallows in Danbury, Connecticut, and two years later, in association with Edward Solomon Parks, his brother, and John Norris, organized the Danbury Fertilizer Co. for the manufacture of fertilizer. Early in 1894 he purchased from his partners the hide and tallow division of this company. The business made tallow from animal fat and bones, which were generally regarded as valueless.

== Career ==
=== Hat business ===
Around 1896, with his brother Edward, he opened a business recovering shellac from stiff hat roundings, which until this time had been regarded as worthless by-products of the hat factories. This business proved successful, especially after he had learned to treat the fur product after removal of the shellac, so that with other furs it could be utilized in the manufacture of felt hats.

In January 1901 he formed a partnership with Joseph P. McGovern of New York, then the senior partner in the firm of J.P. McGovern & Bro., brokers in hatter's furs, in order to further expand the business of the manufacture of hatter's furs. This business, incorporated as American Hatters and Furriers Corp., with a capital of $50,000, was increasingly successful year by year, and in 1906 was reorganized as the American Hatters and Furriers Co., Inc., with a capital of $500,000.

Mr. Parks was president and manager of this company, with Mr. McGovern acting as treasurer and vice president. After Mr. McGovern's death in 1912, the business continued with Mr. Mercier as treasurer. When Mr. Parks died, the capital was $1,250,000.

=== Other roles ===
In 1903 Mr. Parks organized the successful Connecticut Glue Co., of which he was President and Mr. McGovern treasurer. This company was organized to make use of the by-product from the cutting of rabbit skins, the pelt being used to good advantage in the manufacture of "Pure Rabbit Skin Glue."

Mr. Parks was also president of Star Oil Co., Sunfast Hats, Inc., and Irving Trust Co. As a controlling stockholder in Parks-Mercier, Inc., and as president of the C. D. Parks Co., he was interested in large realty holdings. On his extensive country estate in Danbury, "Tarrywile", he maintained a large dairy establishment stocked with the fine cattle and modern equipment.

Mr. Parks was vice president of the Danbury Agricultural Society, which conducted the Danbury Fair; vice president of the Danbury Chamber of Commerce; a member of the Danbury board of finance; and a trustee of the Wooster School, Danbury.

For his record in selling Liberty Loan bonds during World War I, he received a special testimonial from the United States government. He attended the Bridgewood Country and the Danbury clubs of Danbury; the Norwalk Country Club; the Algonquin Club of Bridgeport; the Chemists Club of New York City and the Metabetchuan Club of Canada.

== Personal life ==
Parks was a lover of nature, literature and music.

He was married on December 4, 1889 to Eleanor Sophia, the daughter of Wallace Bruce Parks, of Moreau, New York. They had two daughters: Irene, wife of Louis Chadwick Rathmell; and Jeanette Darling, wife of Dr. Donald Alexander Davis.

In 1910, Charles Darling Parks bought Tarrywile Mansion from Dr. William C. Wiles. He enclosed much of the original estate with a stone wall, created a lake and several ponds, constructed a greenhouse, and added a conservatory to the main house. Later, in 1918, C. D. Parks then bought "Buck's Castle" for his oldest daughter, Irene Parks, as a wedding gift, whose reception was the first to be held in the mansion. During this time the castle was renamed Hearthstone Castle.

He acquired his property by buying up woodlands in the surrounding mountains. It is said that many a "mad hatter" suffering from the effects of mercury poisoning was put to work on the Parks’ farm. An experimenter, Parks fostered the development of new fur-cutting processes and of a non-mercuric carroting solution that eliminated the risk of mercury poisoning to employees.

At one time, the family holdings totaled well over 1,000 acres. It included one of the State's largest independent dairy farms, as well as cornfields, and peach and apple orchards. Faithful to C. D. Parks' vision and commitment to creating a place of natural beauty, his heirs (led by his daughter Jean Parks Davis and her husband Dr. Donald Davis, along with her sister Irene Parks Jennings Rathmell and heirs) held on to most of the property through the 1970s and early 1980s. In 1985 the City purchased the estate consisting of 19 buildings and 535 acres, which is designated for passive recreation.

Mr. Parks died at Danbury, Connecticut on September 14, 1929.
