= Hearthstone Castle =

Historic house in Connecticut, United States

- U.S. National Register of Historic Places
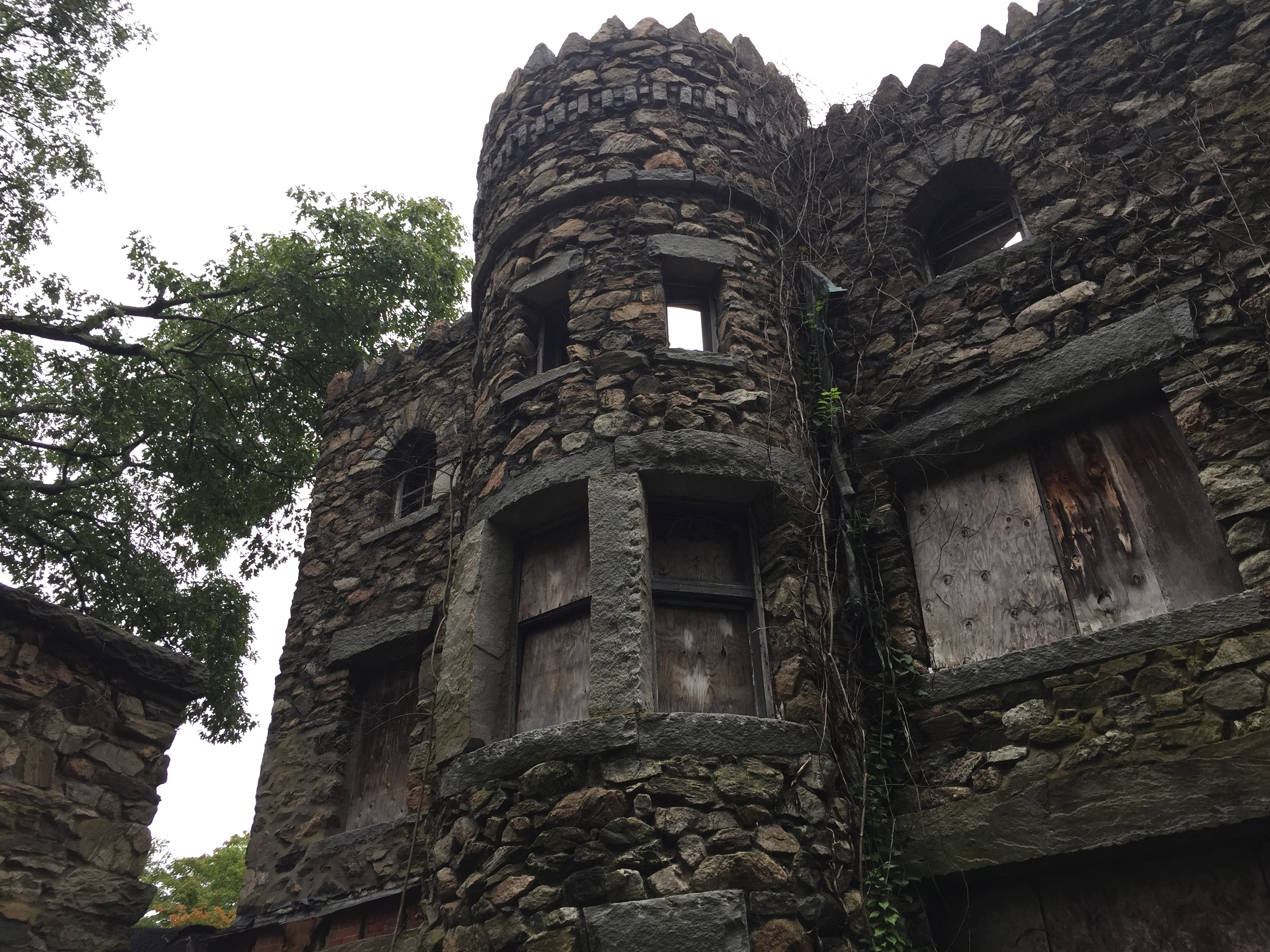
- Hearthstone Castle, Oct 2016

- Location within Connecticut Location within the United States
- Interactive map showing the location of Hearthstone Castle
- Location: 18 Brushy Hill Road, Danbury, Connecticut
- Coordinates: 41°22′41″N 73°26′55″W
- Area: 7.2 acres (2.9 ha)
- Built: 1895
- Architect: Dietrich, Ernest G. W.
- Architectural style: Shingle Style, Norman
- NRHP reference No.: 87002184
- Added to NRHP: December 31, 1987

Hearthstone Castle in Danbury, Connecticut, was built between 1895 and 1899. It was listed on the National Register of Historic Places in 1987. It has also been known as Parks' Castle and as The Castle. The property includes four contributing buildings and three other contributing structures. Today, the castle is owned by the City of Danbury and is located in Tarrywile Park. Hearthstone Castle is slated to be renovated into an observation deck.

== History ==
First known as "Sanford Castle", Hearthstone was designed by architect Ernest G. W. Dietrich for its first owner, E. Starr Sanford, a noted portrait photographer. The castle was intended to be a honeymoon "cottage" for Sanford's wife. Sanford and his family owned the castle for only five years before selling it in 1902 to Victor Buck, a retired New York industrialist. When the Buck family moved in, they renamed the castle "Buck's Castle." In 1910, Charles Darling Parks bought the neighboring Tarrywile Mansion from Dr. William C. Wiles. Later, in 1918, C. D. Parks then bought "Buck's Castle" for his oldest daughter, Irene Parks, as a wedding gift. During this time the castle was renamed "Hearthstone Castle." The name was possibly changed to this due to the eight fireplaces, which were all made out of stone, as was the rest of the castle.

All the rock that was used to build the castle was quarried on site, and transported the short distance across the property on a small railroad, which was built solely for this purpose. All the woodwork throughout the building of the castle was brought in from Italy. All the wrought iron chandeliers, lamps, and wall sconces were made in Danbury by Cephas B. Rogers Co.

Irene Parks Jennings occupied the castle until her death in 1982. The last residents of the castle were her heirs, Richard and Constance Jennings. The Jenningses lived there from 1983 until March 1987, when the entire Tarrywile Estate was sold to the town of Danbury. Hearthstone Castle was declared a National Historic Place that same year. The castle was not well maintained under Danbury's ownership, and the roof has since collapsed. In 2004, Tarrywile Park Authority and The City of Danbury approved two options for renovating the castle.

The first option involves developing the Castle into a three-season pavilion and observation tower. The plan includes stabilization and limited renovation of the castle to provide a kitchen facility for picnics, seating areas for picnics, creation of an observation tower to take advantage of the views afforded by the site and establishment of an educational area, historical exhibits and tourist information center. Efforts would include restoration of the historic landscape and garden design as well as expansion of the site's hiking and passive recreation facilities.

The second option includes the complete restoration of the castle and development of a fully functioning building with lodge areas, restaurant, museum, conference rooms, classrooms, wellness center, information desk, staff residence and gift shop. Restoration of the original gardens and expansion of the hiking trail system would also be undertaken. The restored castle and grounds would provide a major attraction and gathering place for the city, rescue a structure on the National Register of Historic Places and provide an ongoing source of operating income to the Tarrywile Park Authority.

== Description ==
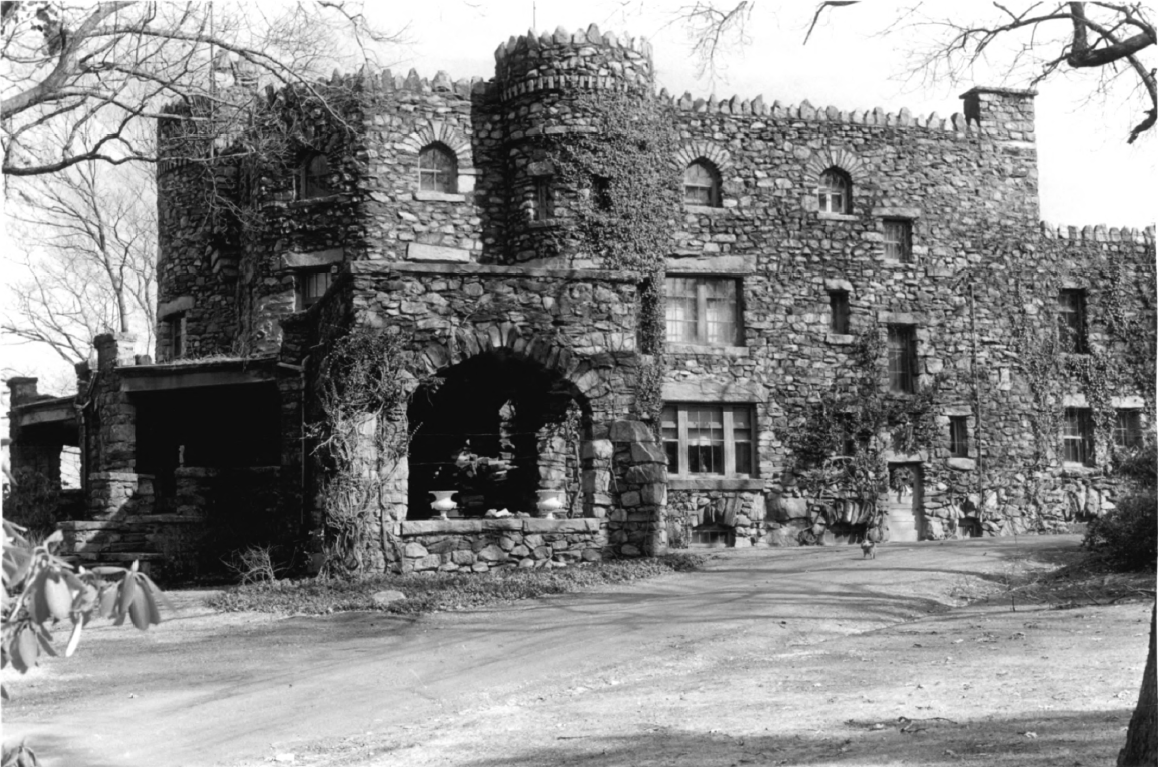
North and West facade of Hearthstone Castle, April 1985

Hearthstone Castle is a three-story, sixteen-room stone castle with associated outbuildings built between 1895 and 1899. It is located in a wooded setting at the crest of a hill to the east of Brushy Hill Road in Danbury, Connecticut. The complex is centered on the castle, which is essentially early Norman in form but incorporates elements of many periods of castle architecture as well as features commonly associated with styles of the late nineteenth century. Outbuildings, all Shingle style, include a caretaker's cottage, carriage house, pump-house, barn, woodshed and water tower, clustered on higher ground to the south of the main building.

The eminence upon which Hearthstone Castle is built is approximately 650 feet above sea level and commands panoramic views to the north and east. A pair of large granite gateposts with globe finials stand at the entrance to the property, on the east side of largely rural and undeveloped Brushy Hill Road. A steep 800-foot-long gravel driveway ascends to the buildings, which cannot be seen from the road.

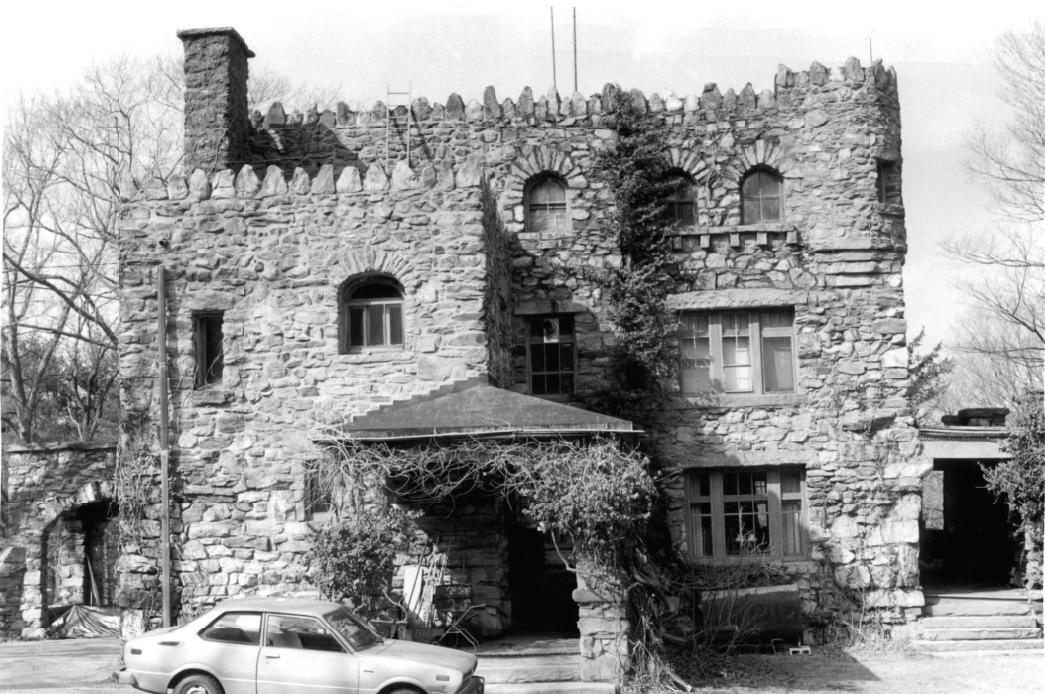
Hearthstone southern elevation, April 1985.

The castle occupies the brow of the hill. Its east wall is built upon a retaining wall which is a direct continuation of the steep hillside, and then curves across the north side. The castle is rectangular in shape, constructed of unfinished local granite over a core of brick. Its dimensions are approximately 45 feet × 83 feet, and it has a flat composition roof, which is surrounded by a parapet with battlements created by pointed, upturned stones. The main or front section of the building features D-ended towers at the northeast corner and beyond the northernmost bay of the west elevation. The end bay of the north facade, located between these two towers, is beveled. An 11-foot-wide veranda on a stone base extends from the south end of the east elevation around the north facade to terminate at a stone porte-cochere to the north of the D-ended tower on the west elevation. Its roof is supported by stone piers which rise above it, and it features a denticulated cornice. The porte-cochere has a flat roof and three pointed-arched openings, with buttresses suggested on the outer piers. In addition to the two towers, there are corbelled bartizans on the southeast corner and on the north facade, and a square chimney on the southeast corner. The corners of the building are reinforced with large stones, some of which resemble quoins. Bands of vertically set stones project below the parapets on the towers. Segmentally arched openings at ground level admit light to the basement, and ventilate the area beneath the veranda.

The windows on the lower two stories are trabeated, with granite slab lintels and sills, while the third story is lighted by pointed and round arched two over two windows. Fenestration is irregular, with large triple windows in the south and east elevations on the first and second stories and in the second story of the north facade. On the east and west elevations, other windows are narrow but irregular in size, and are placed diagonally to light interior staircases. There is a slit-like window in the south elevation, and in the west elevation a narrow window with bull's eye art glass. The rear of the building is a two-story, flat-roofed kitchen wing, 18' x 23', which contains a rear entry.

The front entry is trabeated with a granite lintel and features a double-leaf, semi-glazed door with carved Gothic tracery and sidelights which opens onto an entry hall. The hall features paneled wainscoting, cased and studded beams carried on consoles with carved scrolls, and a fireplace with a denticulated and modillioned mantelpiece carried on consoles carved in the shape of lions, all in oak. To the east of the entry hall is the music room, which has molded door and window surrounds and a peach colored marble Neo-Classical fireplace with cable molding, a central carved scallop, and a denticulated mantelpiece carried on consoles. The music room opens onto the dining room to the south. The dining room features cased beams, molded door and window surrounds, paneled doors, and vertical wainscoting, all in pine. The room is lighted by a large triple window in the south elevation. It has a Georgian fireplace of green glazed brick, with a central panel with dentils and modillions. To the west of the dining room is the library, with oak door and window surrounds and a red brick fireplace with a denticulated mantel with a diamond motif. To the rear is the kitchen.

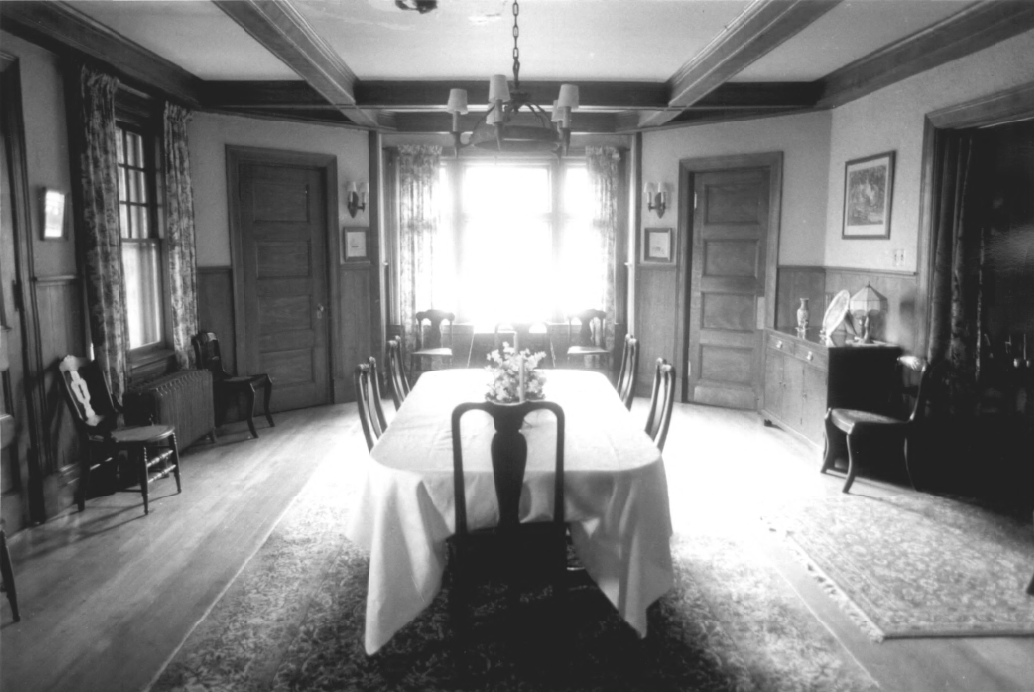
Hearthstone dining room before the furniture was removed, April 1985.

A grand staircase ascends from the entry hall to the second story. It is paneled in oak and edged with bead-and-reel molding. Its first landing is lighted by a large triple window set in the curving wall of the west tower. In the upper panes of the window are stained glass panels which depict the Sanford coat-of-arms. Facing the second floor landing is a full-length fireplace of dark green glazed brick, rimmed with studded iron bands and with bead-and-reel and egg-and-dart moldings at the ceiling. In the chimney breast is a niche, also rimmed with studded iron bands, and the lining of the fireplace is cast iron in a pattern of interwoven bands. All of the doors on the second floor are paneled, and the entry to the hallway is arched. There is a second library with fireplace with oak surround and five bedrooms on the floor, including the large master bedroom in the curving north tower. The five servants' bedrooms on the third floor are unornamented.

The outbuildings are located on a slight rise to the south of the castle. They include the one-story, four-room, hip-roofed caretaker's cottage; a hip-roofed carriage house; a hip-roofed water tower; a woodshed, pump-house, and barn, all clad in wood shingles.

Today the castle lies in ruin. The wooden interior structure, including the multiple floors, have collapsed, leaving the castle in complete disrepair. It has been fenced off to the public.

== Significance ==
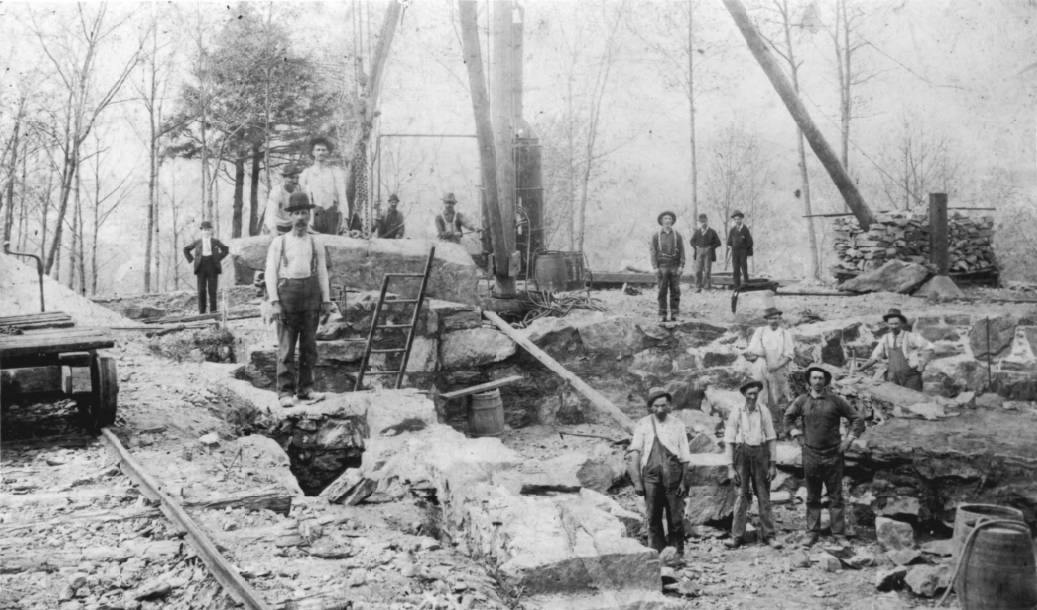
Construction of Hearthstone basement, circa 1896

Hearthstone Castle is significant as late nineteenth-century country estate centered on an architect's interpretation of a medieval castle. Hearthstone Castle and its related Shingle-style outbuildings, which include a caretaker's cottage, carriage house, water tower, pump-house and sheds, were constructed as a summer estate between 1895 and 1899 for Elias Starr Sanford and his wife, Emma. Sanford, a Danbury native, achieved success and a national reputation as a society portrait photographer in New York City as a partner in the firm of Davis & Sanford. Following the dissolution of the firm in the early twentieth century, Sanford conducted studios in New Haven, Atlantic City, Philadelphia, Greenwich and Texas. In 1895, at the height of his success, Sanford purchased eighteen acres of woodland at "Mountain End," a rocky promontory that overlooks the southern part of the city of Danbury. Two acres were cleared, but the property was left ungraded except in the immediate vicinity of the building. Construction of the castle commenced in the fall of 1895 and was completed in June 1899. Stone for the castle was quarried on the property and at Collins quarry to the south on Brushy Hill Road, and was transported to the construction site by means of a narrow-gauge railroad.

The castle's architect was Ernest G. W. Dietrich of New York. A Danbury Evening News article of October 7, 1895, outlines his initial plan for the castle as a seventeen-room, 80 ft × 100 ft building, with its upper story of wood. The same article mentions a 38 ft × 48 ft barn to be constructed with architectural features "corresponding to those of the house," and makes no mention of any other outbuildings. That plans were changed during the course of construction is confirmed by the building of the second story of the castle in stone, with a memorial stone bearing the date "1897" set in the middle of the west elevation, and by the fact that the dimensions of both the castle and the present carriage house are smaller than those stated in the article. A mechanics' lien filed in the Danbury land records by Charles Crossley, a local architect and builder, cites "services rendered" between May, 1897, and June, 1899. However, there is insufficient evidence to conclude that Crossley or a second architect contributed to the castle's design. Moreover, Dietrich is known to have worked in the Shingle style of the outbuildings, and is noted for his residential architecture. Among his commissions is the Luther Turner House at 213 Migeon Avenue in Torrington.

Liens remained on the property until the Sanfords sold it in 1902 to Victor Buck, a retired New York businessman. Mrs. Sanford is reported to have disliked the castle, The Bucks used it as a summer residence until 1923, which it was sold again to Charles Darling Parks. Parks, president of the American Hatters and Furriers Co. and owner of the Tarrywile estate directly to the west of Hearthstone on Brushy Hill Road, is said to have purchased it for his daughter, Irene Parks Jennings Rathmell. Mrs. Rathmell occupied the castle until her death in 1976.

Hearthstone Castle is significant not only for its design, which anticipates the Gillette Castle built in Hadlyme by William Gillette by almost two decades, but for its fine construction and its exceptional preservation as an estate, with all of its major outbuildings intact. It reflects a nineteenth-century taste among newly rich Americans for palatial country residences, as well, as a late Romantic taste for rusticity and exoticism. The estate's grounds were left largely in their natural state, and the castle it-self is referred to in the deed from the Sanfords to the Bucks as "the Lodge." The rough quality of the castle's fieldstone exterior and the wood-shingled walls of the outbuildings reinforce this emphasis on natural textures and on a harmonious relationship with the wooded, mountaintop site. The spacious, open veranda, from which towns far -to the north could be sighted, provided a setting as well for summer parties.

The castle incorporates elements from diverse periods in castle architecture. Its rectangular shape and D-ended towers strongly resemble the early Norman "great tower" castles of Chepstow and Colchester, both of which date from the late eleventh century. The use of corbelled bartizans was common to Scottish castles of the twelfth century. The arched openings of the porte-cochere and the windows appear primitive in part because of their construction, but they also vary in shape from distinctly pointed to distinctly round. The fenestration as a whole represents a compromise between authenticity and modernity. A few narrow medieval-style window slits are irregularly placed diagonally across the west elevation, but large Chicago-style triple windows prevail, and a bull's eye art glass window is even featured in one of the slits.

The interior also represents a compromise between the medieval theme and the nineteenth century. A medieval feeling is carried out fully in the entry hall and grand staircase, but the fireplace and paneled wall treatment are essentially Elizabethan. The rooms receive individual treatments which reach to a Georgian feeling in the dining room, and a restrained Classicism in the music room.

== See also ==
- National Register of Historic Places listings in Fairfield County, Connecticut
