= Charles Parker =

Charles or Charlie Parker may refer to:

== Politicians and administrators ==
- Charles D. Parker (1827–1925), lieutenant governor of Wisconsin
- Charles H. Parker (1814–1890), Wisconsin legislator
- Charles Parker (Australian politician) (1896–1956), New South Wales politician
- Charles Parker (British politician), activist in the British National Party
- Charles Parker (New Zealand politician) (1809–1898), New Zealand politician and carpenter
- Charles Parker (Michigan politician) (1877–1934), member of the Michigan House of Representatives
- Charlie Parker (Nova Scotia politician) (born 1951), NDP MLA for Pictou West in Nova Scotia, Canada
- Charles Stuart Parker (1829–1909), British member of parliament for Perth, 1878–1892
- Charles William Parker (1912–1997), clergyman and politician in British Columbia, Canada

== Sportsmen ==
- Charlie Parker (basketball) (born 1948), American basketball coach
- Charlie Parker (cricketer) (1882–1959), English cricketer
- Charlie Parker (footballer) (1891–1969), English footballer
- Charlie Parker (Canadian football) (born 1941), American-born Canadian football player

== Cultural figures ==
- Charles Parker (producer) (1919–1980), BBC Radio producer of the Radio Ballads
- Charlie Parker (1920–1955), jazz musician

== Others ==
- Sir Charles Parker, 5th Baronet (1792–1869), British naval officer
- Charles Parker (VC) (1870–1918), English recipient of the Victoria Cross
- Charles S. Parker (died 1950), American botanist
- Charles E. Parker (1836–1909), American judge from New York
- Charles Wolcott Parker (1862–1948), judge in New Jersey
- Charles Edward Parker (1826–1890), American architect from Boston, Massachusetts
- C. W. Parker (1864–1932), American manufacturer of carousels and other carnival rides

== Characters ==
- Charles Parker (character), fictional detective character created by Dorothy L. Sayers
- Charley Parker, DC Comics character Golden Eagle I
- Charlie Parker, a fictional former police officer in a series of crime novels by John Connolly
- Ensign Charles Parker, character in McHale's Navy

== See also ==
- Charles Parks (disambiguation)
