= Hired armed ship Harlequin =

His Majesty's hired armed ship Harlequin served the British Royal Navy from 2 July 1804, until she was wrecked on 7 December 1809. She was of 18537/94 tons (bm), and she carried an armament of ten 6-pounder guns, eight 12-pounder carronades, and two swivel guns. During her service with the Royal Navy Harlequin captured a number of prizes. In 1809, she was wrecked near Newhaven as she was escorting a convoy in the Channel.

== Letter of Marque ==
The hired armed ship Harlequin probably was the ship Harlequin that received a letter of marque on 27 August 1803. Her master was John Dyer and her description on the warrant gave her burthen as 180 tons, her armament as twenty 6 and 12-pounder cannons, and her crew as consisting of 70 men.

In late May the privateer Harlequin, under the command of Captain Jenkins, arrived at Fowey from Oporto. She reported that while at Oporto in early 1804, Harlequin's boat, with Captain Dyer and five other men, was swamped. A Portuguese boat rescued a Mr. Hall, but the other five were all drowned. Then in April, while she was off Cape Finisterre, she had repelled a French vessel but only after losing one man killed and nine wounded. Next, on 9 May, she had driven a French schooner of four carriage guns and 40 men ashore three leagues south of Viana where the schooner went to pieces.

== Naval service ==
In February 1806, Harlequin sent into Portsmouth Vigilantia, Hersels, master, sailing from Bordeaux to Altona.

Harlequin was under the command of Lieutenant Phillip C. Anstruther when she captured four Prussian vessels on 3 April: Petronelle, Vrow Maria, Jonge Roelf Polman, and Iris. Iris, Teedman, master, had been sailing from Bordeaux to Konigsberg, and Jong Roelf Palmas had been sailing from Bordeaux to Emden. Petronelle's master was named Dene. Harlequin then sent them into Falmouth.

A few days later, Harlequin sent Vrow Maria, Fenn, master, into Penzance. Vrow Maria had been sailing from Bayonne to Stetin.

In May, Harlequin detained Anna Margaretta, of Lubeck, which had been sailing from Bordeaux. That same month Harlequin detained Catharina, of and for Hambro, Slieboom, master, which had sailed from Lisbon. Harlequin sent her into Falmouth. Catherina was liberated and left Falmouth on 28 May.

At the end of June, Harlequin sent Eliza, an American vessel, Hallowell, master, into Falmouth. Eliza had been sailing from Providence to Amsterdam.

Later that year, on 10 December, Harlequin was in company with Locust when they recaptured Betsey.

Then on 30 August 1807, Harlequin captured the Danish ship Ole Smith Ploug. Lloyd's List reported that Ole, Smith, master, and Plough, Gausil, master, which Harlequin had detained, arrived in Plymouth on 3 September.

Two months later, on 30 October 1807, Harlequin recaptured Galatea, Thomas Ballantyne, master. Galatea had been sailing from Dublin to London when a French privateer had captured her. Harlequin sent her into Dover.

On 16 June 1808, Harlequin was driven ashore on the Isle of Wight between Cowes and Yarmouth. She was refloated, repaired, and returned to service.

== Loss ==
On 5 December 1809, Harlequin, still under Anstruther's command, left Plymouth Sound with a convoy of 22 vessels that she was escorting through the English Channel. On the evening of 7 December, she suddenly struck the shore. Her crew chopped away her masts, fired distress guns, and burnt blue lights. Still, six other vessels in the convoy also ran ashore. Apparently, in the darkness, the vessels had mistakenly believed they had passed Beachy Head and so prematurely changed course, with the result that they ran ashore west of Seaford. Two men of Harlequin's crew drowned. Apparently the warning signals saved the 16 other vessels in the convoy.

There was a passenger aboard Harlequin, traveling with his wife and two children. After all the men were ashore, it was realized that the woman and her children were still on board. Two sailors took a boat and at tremendous risk brought them all safely to shore.

The six merchant vessels that were lost, with the number of casualties in parentheses, were:

- ship Weymouth (4), Lewellyn, master, from Gibraltar to London;
- brig Traveller (0), Coulson, master, from Malaga;
- schooner Albion (0), from Gibraltar;
- Unice (or Eunice, 0), from New York to Tonnigen;
- Promsiwitbow (14);
- Methedost (or Metbedacht; all).

One estimate gives the total number of people lost on the merchant vessels as 40.
