= HMS Harlequin =

Five vessels of the Royal Navy have been named HMS Harlequin.

- HMS Harlequin (1796) was a schooner of 14 guns, purchased in 1796 in the West Indies and still listed in 1802.
- HMS Harlequin (1813) was a Cruizer-class brig-sloop of 18 guns, launched in 1813 and sold in Jamaica in 1829.
- HMS Harlequin (1814) was an American gunboat captured at the Battle of Lake Borgne on 14 December 1814. Lieutenant James Hunter, who had been wounded at the battle, was appointed to command her with a commission dated 27 February 1815, and she was paid off in June 1815. The Admiralty formally purchased her in 1815 in the West Indies and she was still listed as a tender in Bermuda in 1816. Prize money for her and the other vessels captured at the battle was paid in July 1821.
- HMS Harlequin (1836) was a brig-sloop of 16 guns launched in 1836, converted to a coal hulk in 1860 and sold in 1889.
- HMS Harlequin was a wood screw sloop of 950 tons burthen (bm), laid down at Portsmouth Dockyard on 13 February 1861 and cancelled on 16 February 1864.

The Royal Navy also employed a hired armed ship Harlequin in 1804; she was wrecked on 7 December 1809.
