= Sir Charles Parker, 5th Baronet =

Royal Navy Admiral (1792–1869)

Admiral Sir Charles Parker Bt
- Portrait of Parker, 1826 by Thomas Uwins
- Born: 16 June 1792
- Died: 13 March 1869 (aged 76); Clifton, Bristol
- Military career
- Allegiance: United Kingdom
- Branch: Royal Navy
- Rank: Admiral

Admiral Sir Charles Christopher Parker, 5th Baronet (16 June 1792 – 13 March 1869) was a British naval officer, the son of Christopher Parker and Augusta Byron, and grandson of Admirals Sir Peter Parker, 1st Baronet and John Byron.

He entered the Royal Navy in June 1804, aboard HMS Glory. He followed his captain to Barfleur, and in June 1805, went with his brother Peter to the sloop Weazel. In March 1806, he went aboard Eagle, and was engaged in active service off Italy. By 1809, he was aboard St George, the flagship of Rear-Admiral Francis Pickmore in the Baltic Sea. He later served on the massive San Josef (captured at Cape St. Vincent in 1797) and from May 1810, aboard the frigate Unité. Promoted lieutenant on 17 June 1811, he was badly injured not long afterwards in a fall from the quarterdeck, and was invalided out in August 1811 to recover.

Parker was able to return to the service in early 1812, under his brother Peter in the frigate Menelaus. In May 1812, Charles moved to Malta, wherein he served until 5 April 1815, when he was promoted commander. From 1819 to 1822, he served in Harlequin off the coast of Ireland, and was promoted to post-captain on 23 April 1822, but saw no further service after that year. On the retired list, he was promoted rear-admiral in 1852, vice-admiral in 1857, and admiral in 1863.

Parker married Georgiana Ellis Pallmer, but had no children. He inherited the family baronetcy in 1835 from his brother John, a captain in the Royal Regiment of Artillery, and it became extinct upon his death at Clifton, Bristol in 1869.

== See also ==
- O'Byrne, William Richard (1849). "Parker, Charles Christopher" . A Naval Biographical Dictionary . John Murray – via Wikisource.

Baronetage of Great Britain
Preceded by John Parker	Baronet (of Bassingbourn); 1835–1869	Extinct
