= Tarrywile Park =

- Tarrywile
- U.S. National Register of Historic Places
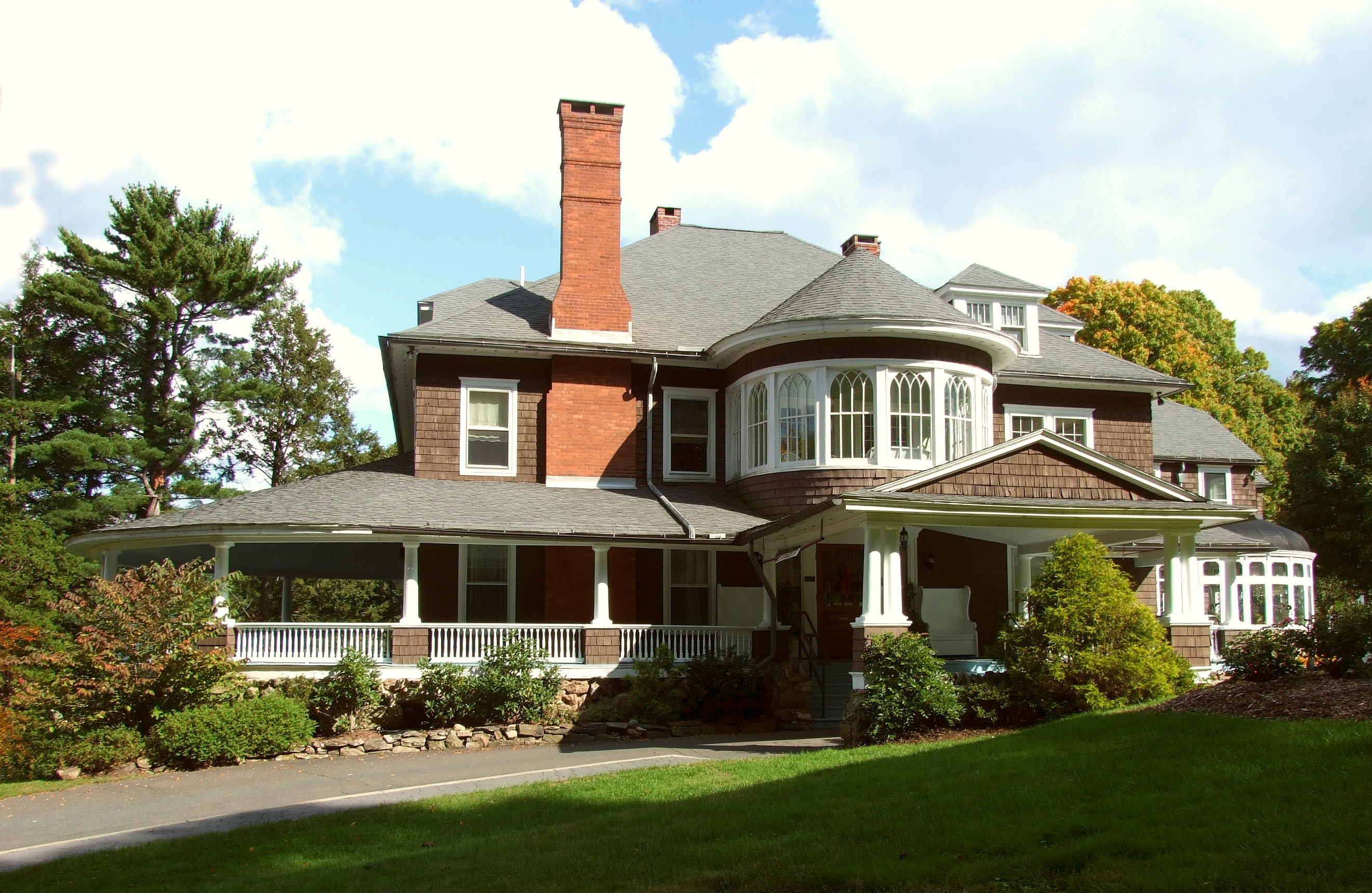

- Location within Connecticut Location within the United States
- Location: Southern Boulevard & Mountainville Road, Danbury, Connecticut
- Coordinates: 41°22′46″N 73°27′10″W
- Area: 11 acres (4.5 ha)
- Built: 1895
- Architect: Childs & Degal; Sunderland, Philip N.
- Architectural style: Shingle Style
- NRHP reference No.: 87001409
- Added to NRHP: January 6, 1988

Tarrywile Park is a large municipal park in the city of Danbury, Connecticut. The park consists of 722 acres (292 ha) of rolling hills with woodlands, fields, and ponds. It also includes the Tarrywile Mansion, probably the finest Shingle Style house in the city. The house and its 11-acre (4.5 ha) property, including a gatehouse, carriagehouse, and greenhouse, was listed on the National Register of Historic Places in 1988. The park also includes Hearthstone Castle, an 1895 castle-like summer house that is in poor condition.

The park has a variety of trails, and is open for hiking, picnicking, and other outdoor activities. The mansion can be toured by appointment, and is rentable for private functions.

== See also ==
- National Register of Historic Places listings in Fairfield County, Connecticut
