= Charles Parks (sculptor) =

American sculptor (1922–2012)

- Born: 1922; Onancock, Virginia
- Died: October 25, 2012 (aged 89–90)
- Occupation: Sculptor
- Known for: Donating works to the State of Delaware

Charles Cropper Parks (1922 – October 25, 2012) was an American sculptor who donated almost 300 of his works to the State of Delaware in 2011.

== Biography ==
Charles Parks was born in Onancock, Virginia, in 1922. He served in the air force during World War II, before getting an education at University of Delaware and the Pennsylvania Academy of the Fine Arts.

Parks and his wife, Inge, created the Charles Parks foundation in 2003. In 2011 the Parks family donated approximately 290 sculptures from Charles Parks' private collection to the State of Delaware, in the hope they would be displayed to the public.

Parks died in Wilmington, Delaware, on October 25, 2012, age 90. Delaware governor, Jack Markell, described Parks as "an extraordinarily talented artist and sculptor whose life work made an impact on so many".

In April 2013 thirteen of Parks' sculptures were exhibited at the First State Heritage Park Welcome Centre and Galleries, organised by the Delaware Division of Historical and Cultural Affairs.
