= Pembroke, Danbury, Connecticut =

Unincorporated area in Danbury, Connecticut, United States

- Unincorporated area
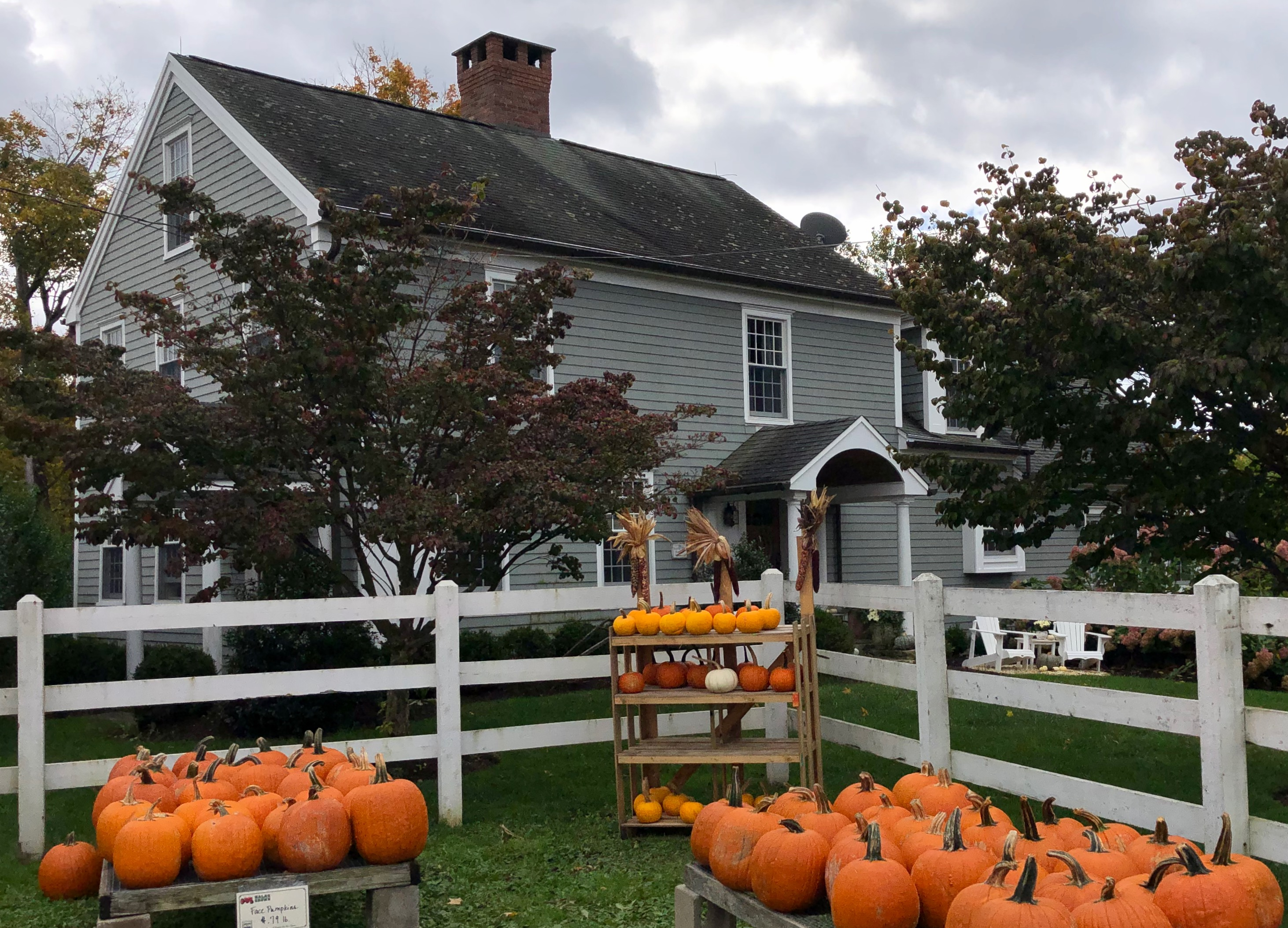
- Farm market at the center of Pembroke

- Location in Connecticut Location in the United States
- Coordinates: 41°25′57.0″N 73°28′24.1″W
- Country: United States
- U.S. state: Connecticut
- County: Fairfield
- Region: Western CT
- City: Danbury
- Elevation: 274 ft (83.6 m)
- ZIP Code: 06811

Pembroke is an unincorporated area in Danbury, Connecticut. It is situated in the north-central section of the city, south of the New Fairfield border, east of King Street, west of the Great Plain neighborhood, and north of the Hayestown neighborhood. The Federal Correctional Institution, Danbury is located in Pembroke.

== History ==
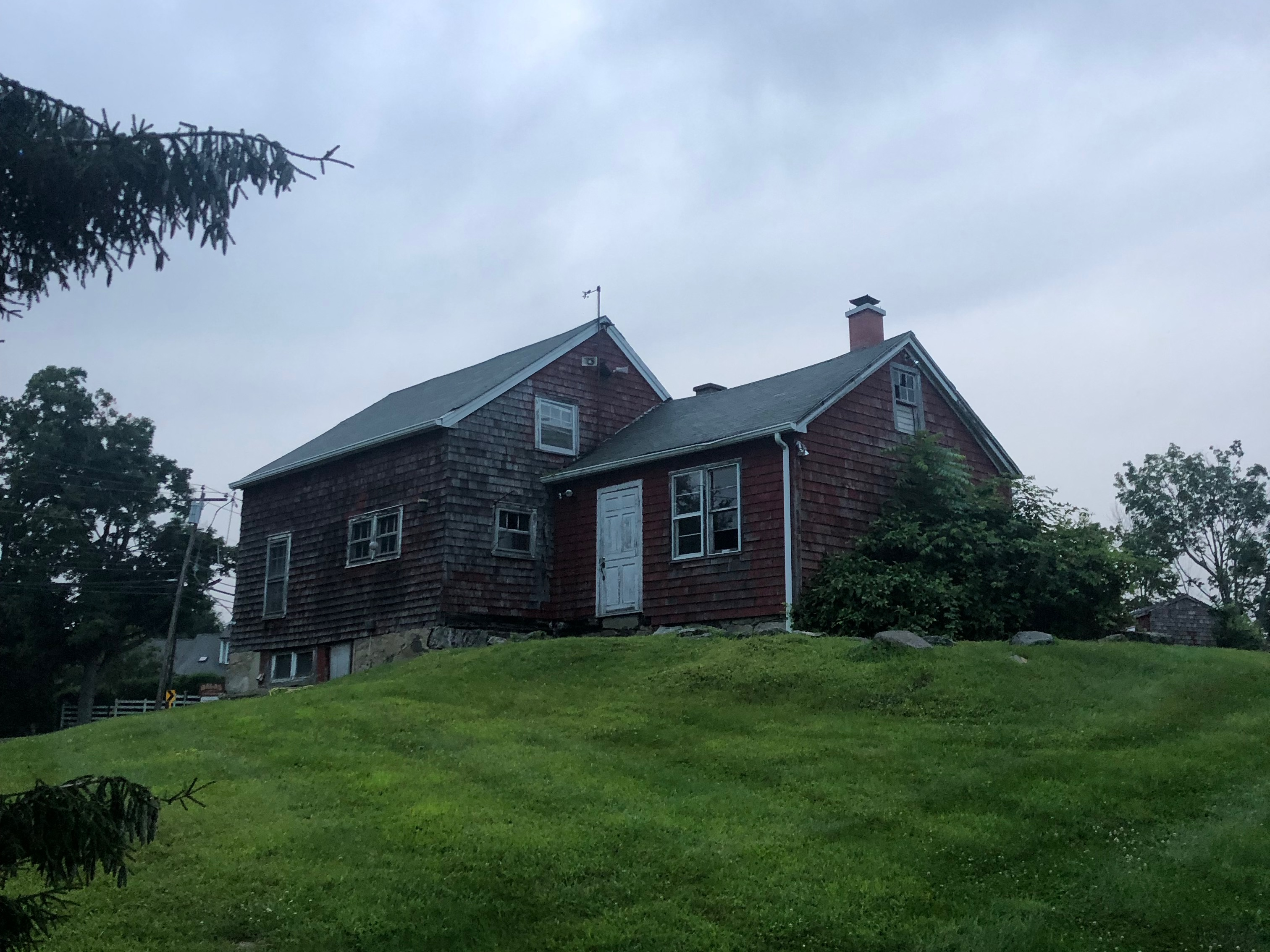
Former Knapp House (c. 1853), now used as an outbuilding

Pembroke officially became a district in 1769, and similar to neighboring districts like Great Plain & King Street, its identity is historically rooted in agriculture. Today however, Halas Farm is the only remaining active farm in the area.

Mention of Pembroke can be found in records from as far back as the 1740s, where it is referred to as "Penbrook" in an estate document. Despite the variant spelling, it is believed that the district was named after Pembroke, Wales.

As was standard for Danbury’s rural districts, Pembroke maintained its own one-room schoolhouse and community cemetery.

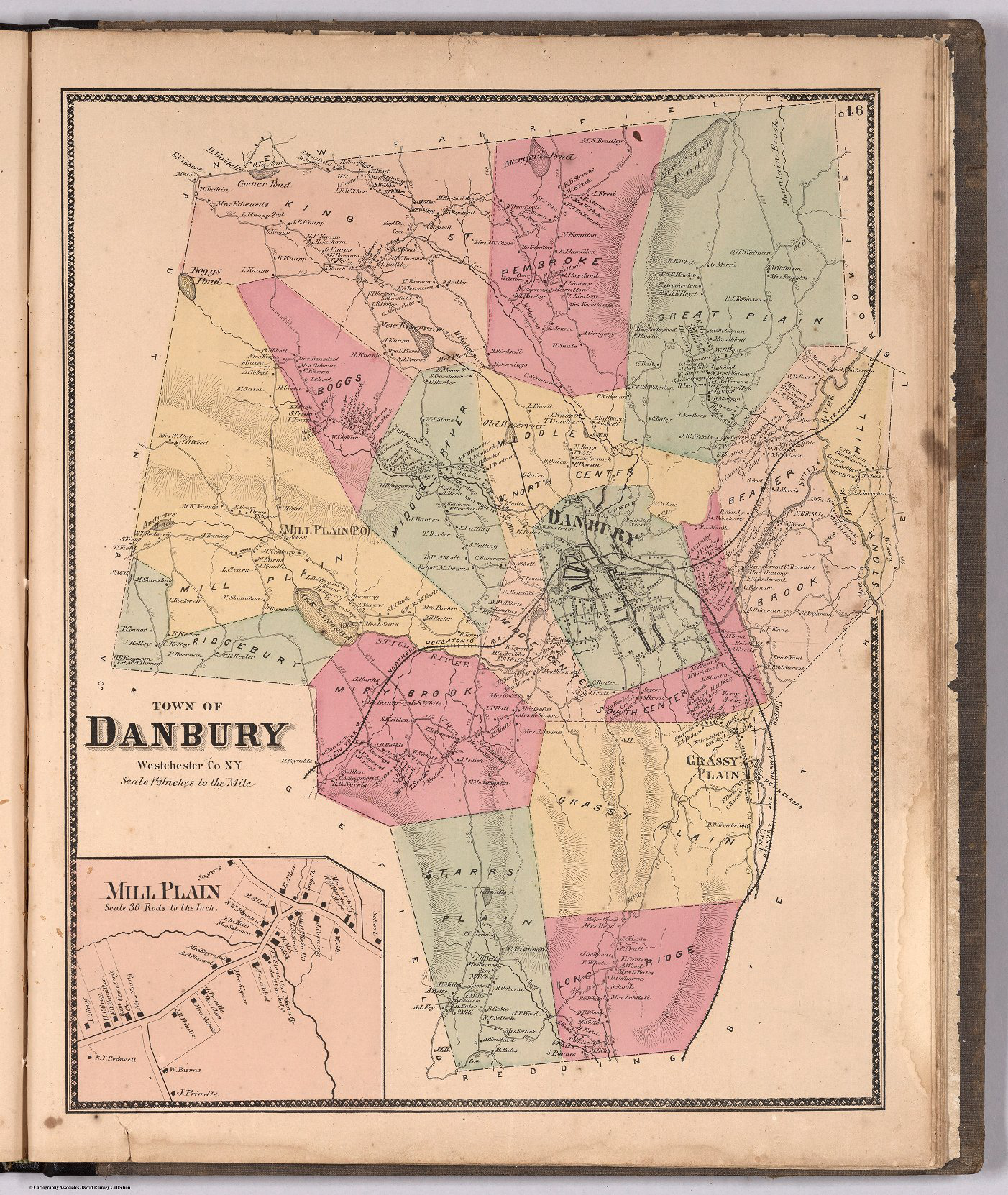
1867 Map of Danbury Pembroke Dist. at the northern border, between King Street and Great Plain).

Among Pembroke's prominent early families were the Barnums and the Hamiltons, both of whom owned extensive swaths of land in the area. The Barnum name carries added distinction due to the family's descent from Thomas Earl Barnum, one of Danbury's original eight settlers. The Hamilton family's legacy is grounded in patriotism, which can be attributed to Captain Silas Hamilton's involvement in the Revolutionary War and defense against the British during the 1777 burning of Danbury. Pembroke overall gained the reputation of being a "patriotic section of town" due in part to such contributions.

The 1930s brought significant changes to the area, primarily resulting from the federal government's acquisition of 146 acres (59 ha) of Barnum-owned land to build FCI Danbury. Despite this, Capitola Barnum would still be reported as one of the leading landowners in all of Danbury nearly two decades later. Capitola Road, located off Barnum Road, is named in her honor. By 1955, the remaining 778 acres (315 ha) of her land was transferred to her son, George C. Barnum, and grandson, George C. Barnum Jr. Most of the property was in the Pembroke District however, some of it extended into a section of Hayestown that would eventually be developed into Jeanette Heights. Although much of the Barnum land in Pembroke was developed in the years that followed, certain areas have been preserved as open space, notably the Barnum Road Tract.

As a result of increased development of the area and its surroundings, Pembroke Elementary School opened in the fall of 1970.

On May 29, 1987 Bear Mountain Reservation was dedicated by Mayor James Dyer. This land originally belonged to the Hamilton family and later the Halas family, who operated a dairy farm there before relocating to their current location within Pembroke.

=== FCI Danbury ===
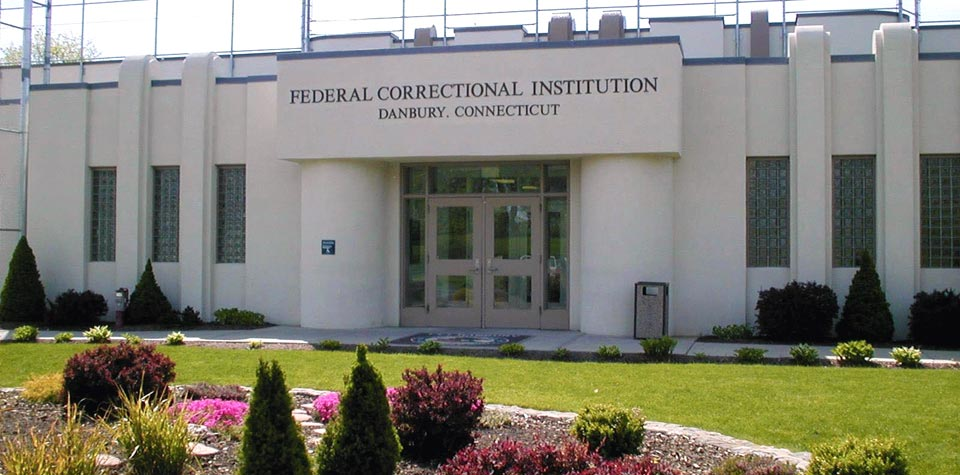
Entrance to the Danbury FCI, Pembroke Rd

In 1938 the U.S. Government acquired a large tract of land in the Pembroke District, with plans to build a federal prison. Other locations in Danbury that had previously been considered were Thomas Mountain and Stadley Rough, however, the Pembroke site was deemed to be the best fit. Many residents would feel a sense of resentment following the announcement, with strong concerns about the site of the prison, most commonly pertaining to the potential impact on their Candlewood area property values.

== Geography ==
In addition to Candlewood Lake, there are also two reservoirs in Pembroke: Margerie Lake Reservoir and Padanaram Reservoir.

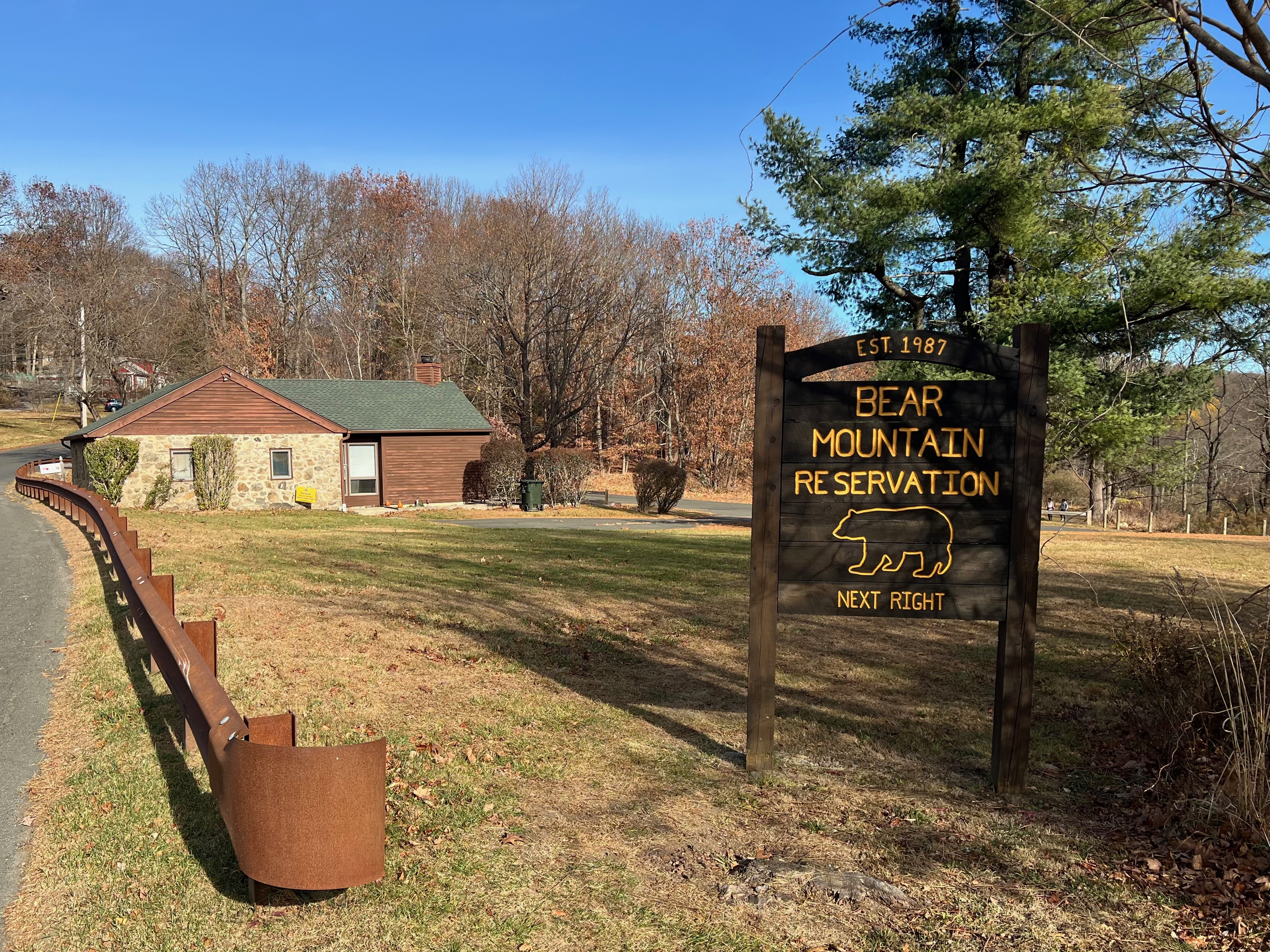
Sign for Bear Mountain Reservation with ranger cottage in the background

The majority of the Candlewood shoreline is occupied by the prison and Bear Mountain Reservation, a 140-acre (57 ha) park with several hiking trails. The only residential lakefront section of Pembroke is a community called Candlewood Pines, almost all of which is owned by a New York City based private equity company. To the dismay of Pembroke locals, plans to move forward with development of the land were approved in 2008. It is the largest remaining tract of undeveloped land along Danbury’s portion of Candlewood Lake. The same company that owns the Candlewood Pines tract is also responsible for Poets Landing in Hayestown.

The Danbury Planning Commission initially approved the Candlewood Pines 14-lot subdivision in October of 2008 however, the land would remain vacant for many years to come. An extension for the approval was requested in March of 2017, giving the company until October 2022 to make progress. In 2023 the company requested an additional extension that expires in 2027. Little construction has occurred since then.

== Parks and recreation ==
- Bear Mountain Reservation
- Margerie Reservoir Dog Park
