= Margerie Lake Reservoir =

Reservoir in New Fairfield, Connecticut

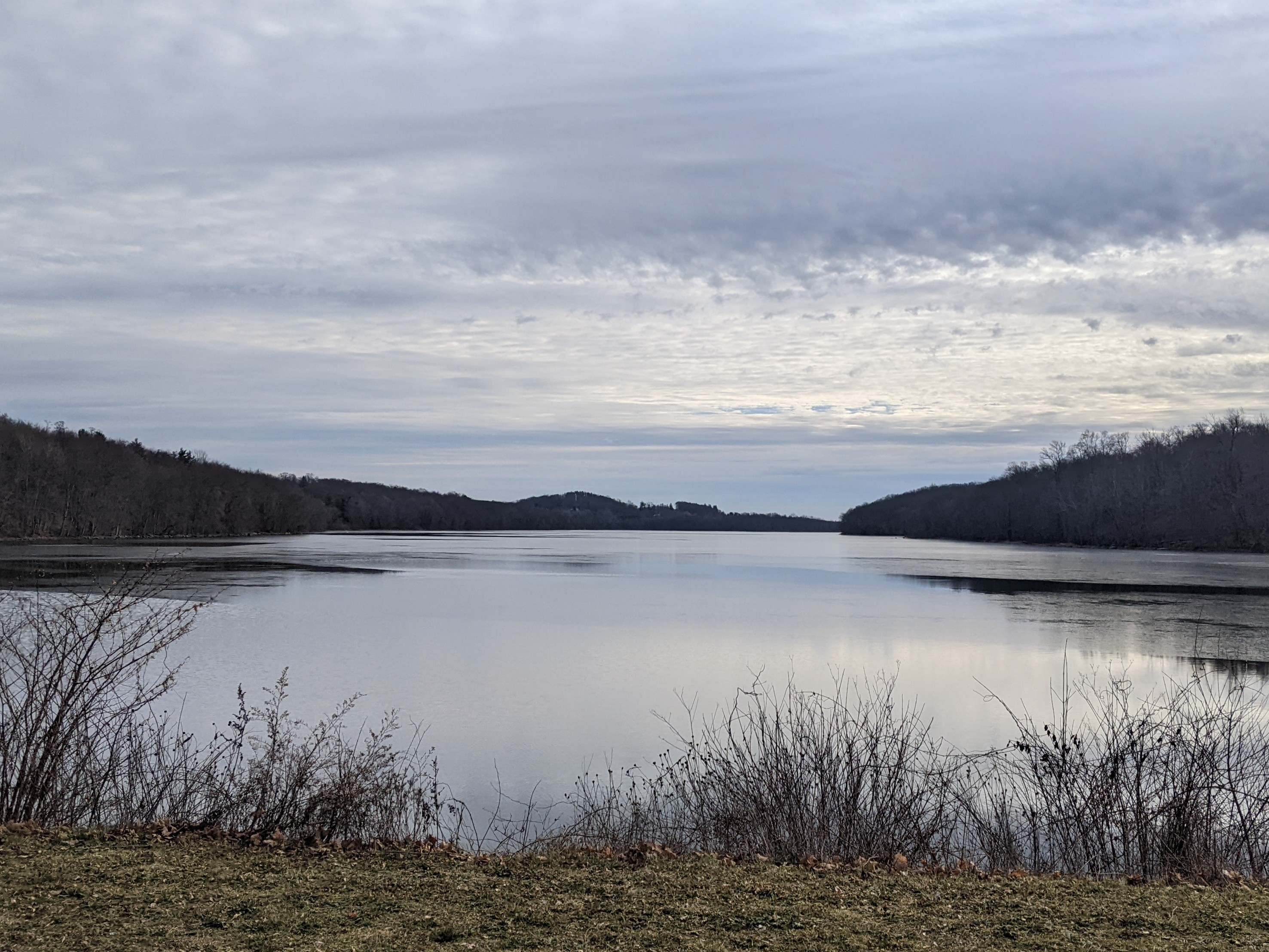
- North shore of Margerie Lake Reservoir, 2023

- Location within Connecticut
- Location: New Fairfield, Connecticut
- Coordinates: 41°27′10.77″N 73°28′48.40″W
- Max. length: 8,600 feet (2,600 m)
- Surface area: 244 acres (99 ha)

Interactive map of Margerie Lake Reservoir

Margerie Lake Reservoir is a 244 acre lake in the Pembroke area of Danbury and New Fairfield, Connecticut. It is a source of public drinking water, maintained by the Danbury Water Department. It has a watershed of 2,942 acres.

== History ==
The area was originally a valley with a smaller body of water named Margerie Pond. The land was marshland that was also referred to as Margerie Swamp. The land was not suitable for development, but was a spot for foraging cranberries. Plans to dam Margerie Creek to create a reservoir started in 1905. Margerie Swamp was purchased for the purposes of creating a reservoir in 1929. Initially there were concerns about the potability of water in Margerie Creek, and opponents thought the project would be too costly. However, construction of the dam began in 1932.

Margerie Lake Reservoir Dam, a 735 feet long earthfill embankment at the south end of the reservoir, was completed in 1934. A larger earthfill dike was also constructed the north side. At its inception, the reservoir produced five million gallons of water per day. By 1992, that number was down to two million.

In December 2021, the town of New Fairfield was granted funds for the construction of a 2.5 mile walking trail along the lake.

The reservoir suffers from periodic algae blooms.
