= Beaverbrook, Connecticut =

Locality in Danbury, Connecticut, United States

- Unincorporated area
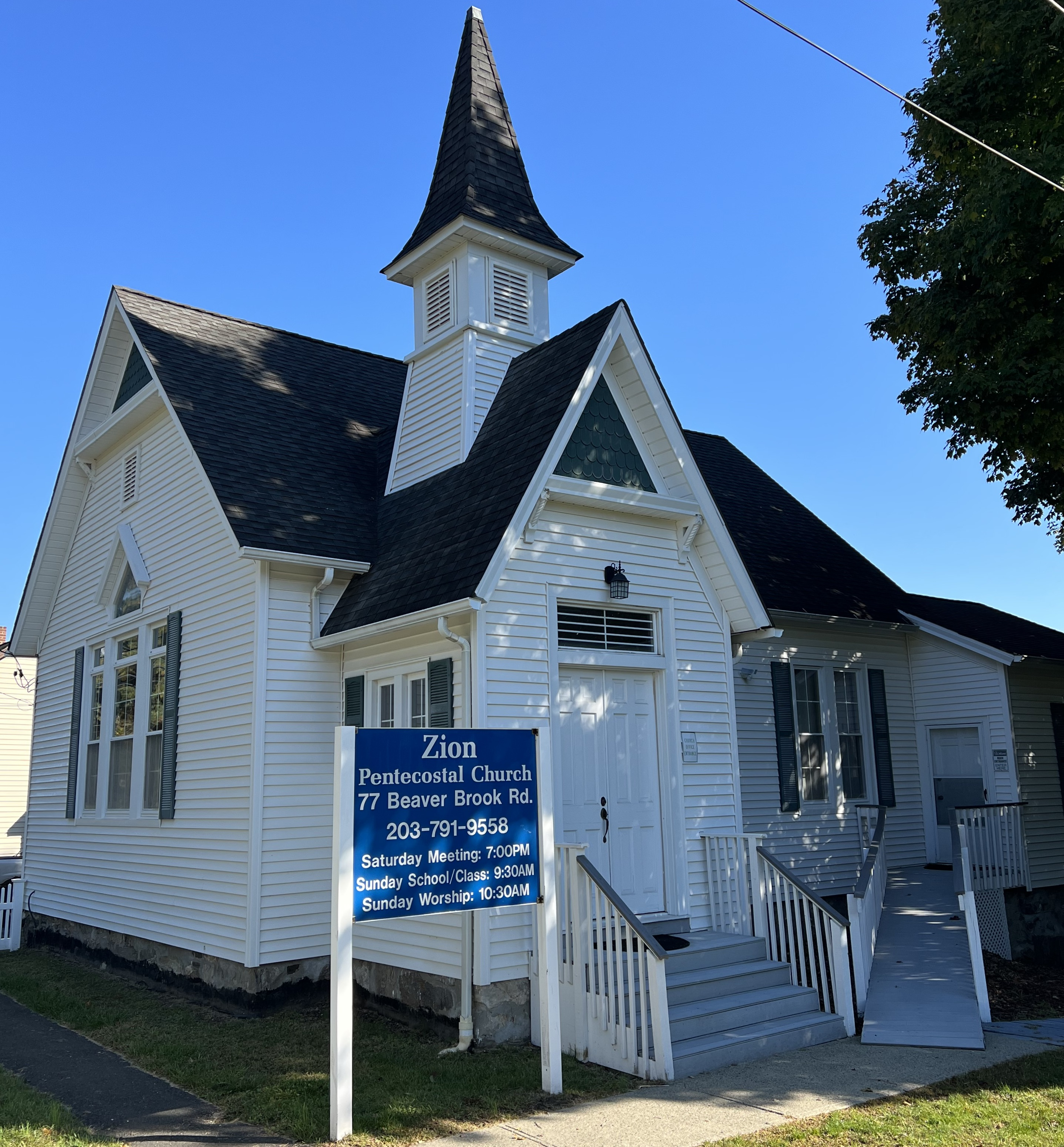
- Beaverbrook Chapel

- Location in Connecticut Location in the United States
- Coordinates: 41°24′40.34″N 73°25′11.44″W
- Country: United States
- U.S. state: Connecticut
- County: Fairfield
- Region: Western CT
- City: Danbury

Beaverbrook or Beaver Brook, is an unincorporated area in the City of Danbury, Fairfield County, Connecticut.

== History ==
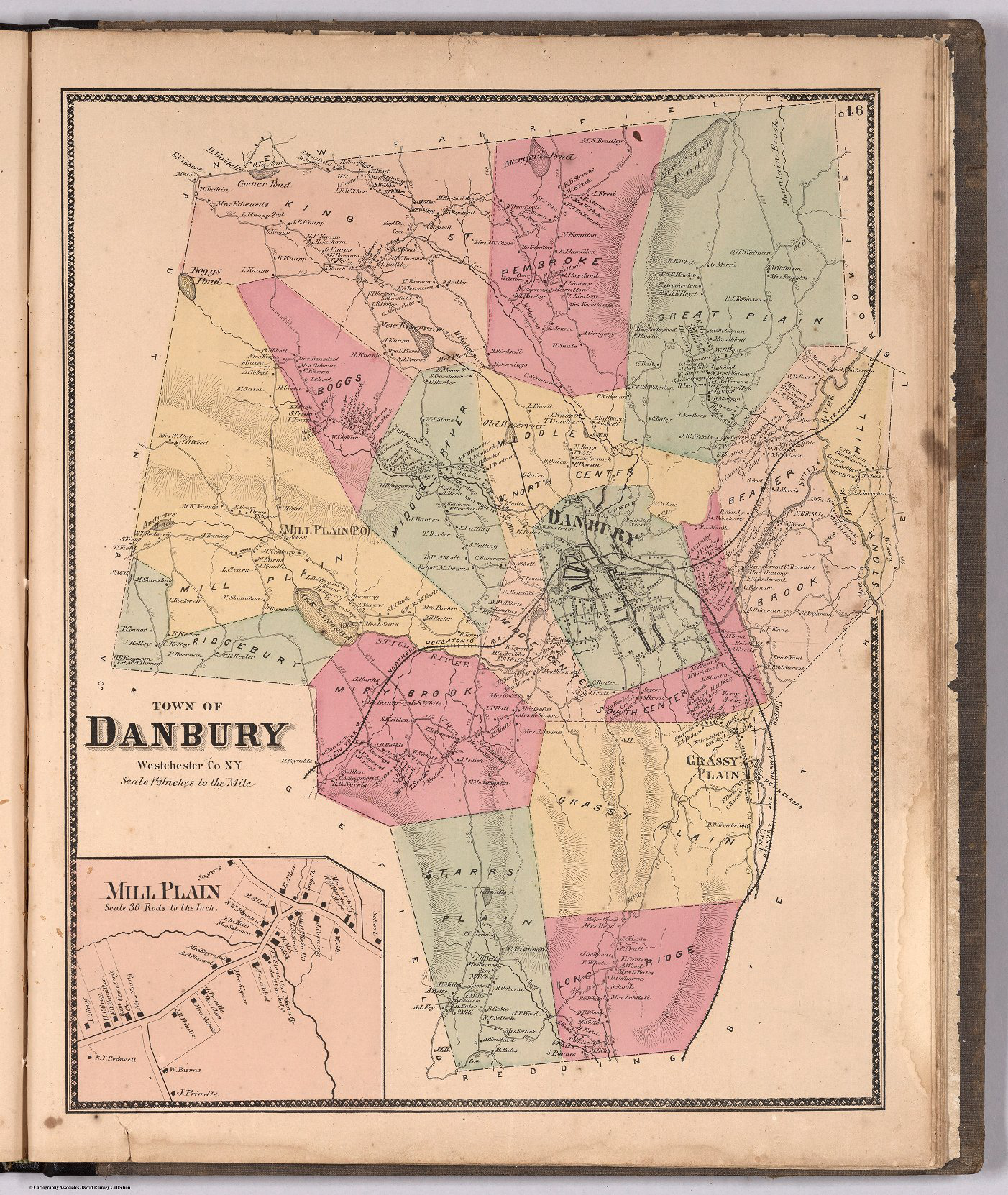
Map of Danbury (1867), Beaverbrook is mapped out on the right-hand side

The area is named after the stream, which flows north out of East Swamp in Bethel and connects with the Still River in East Danbury. References to Beaver Brook can be found from as far back as 1743, although many maps identify Beaver Brook as Limekiln Brook or East Swamp Brook.

Upstream, north of the confluence, is Beaver Brook Mountain, which extends from Danbury into Brookfield. The mountain was considered part of Danbury's Beaver Brook district until Brookfield was incorporated from Danbury in 1788. Despite the official incorporation, this particular area would still be recognized as Beaver Brook for years to come. Notably, the White Turkey Inn, which was established 28 years prior to Brookfield's incorporation, would continue to advertise as a Danbury locale.

=== Industry ===
1790 marks the start of Beaverbrook's industrial timeline, with the construction of the Beaver Brook paper manufacturing mill, which would later become the McArthur paper mill. Another noteworthy operation in Beaverbrook was the E. Sturdevant wool hat factory, which operated until it was destroyed by fire on August 31, 1873.

To this day the area is considered a heavily industrial area.

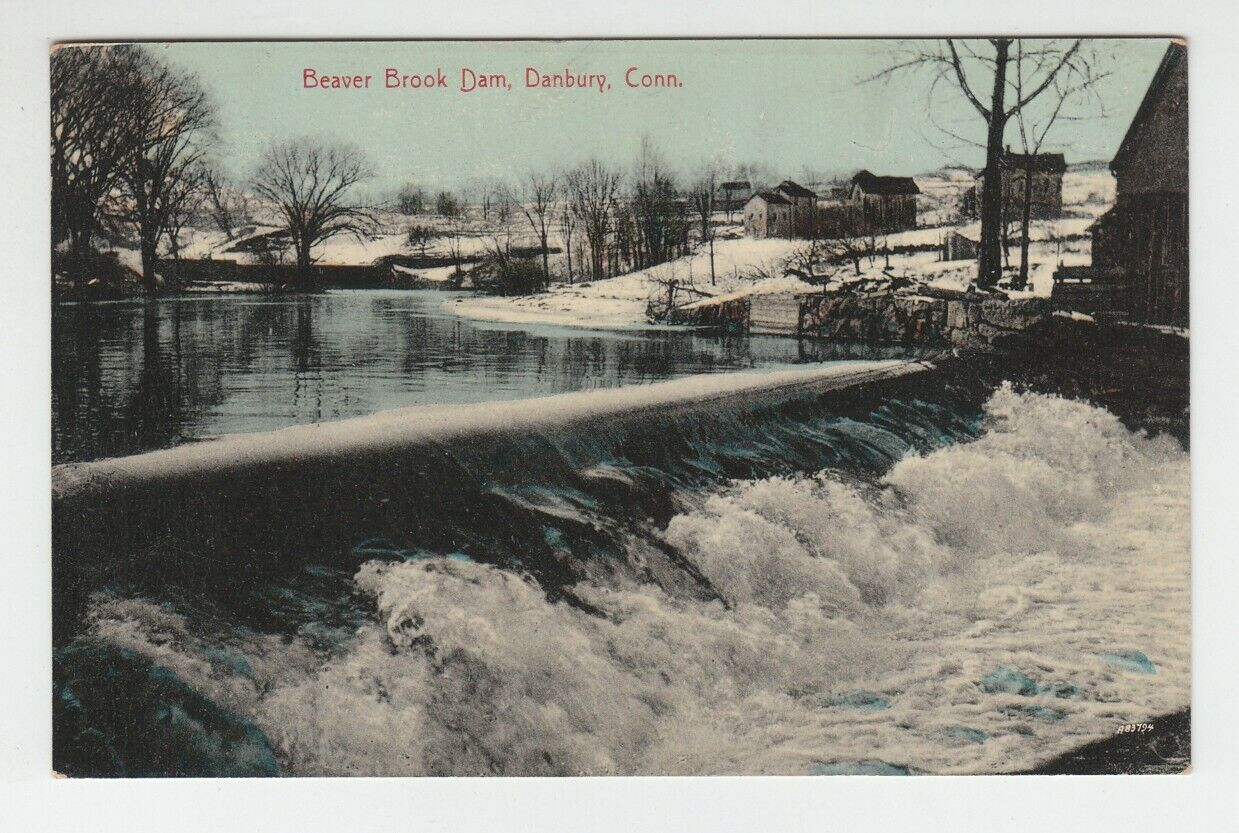
Beaver Brook paper mill dam

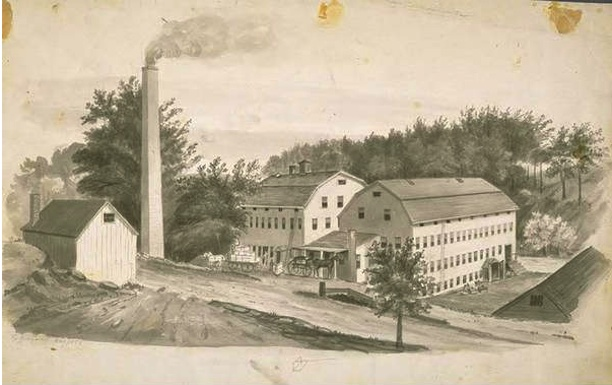
Studevant Hat Factory

== Geography ==
Beaverbrook borders the Stony Hill & Plumtrees sections of Bethel, the Beaver Brook Mountain section of Brookfield, as well as the Danbury neighborhoods of Great Plain, Germantown, and Shelter Rock.

=== Construction of I-84 ===
Construction of the "Yankee Expressway" in Danbury divided the neighborhood, isolating the northernmost section of Beaverbrook (now Old Brookfield Rd. and the Danbury portion of Federal Rd. North). The project resulted in hundreds of displaced families.

== Sites of interest ==
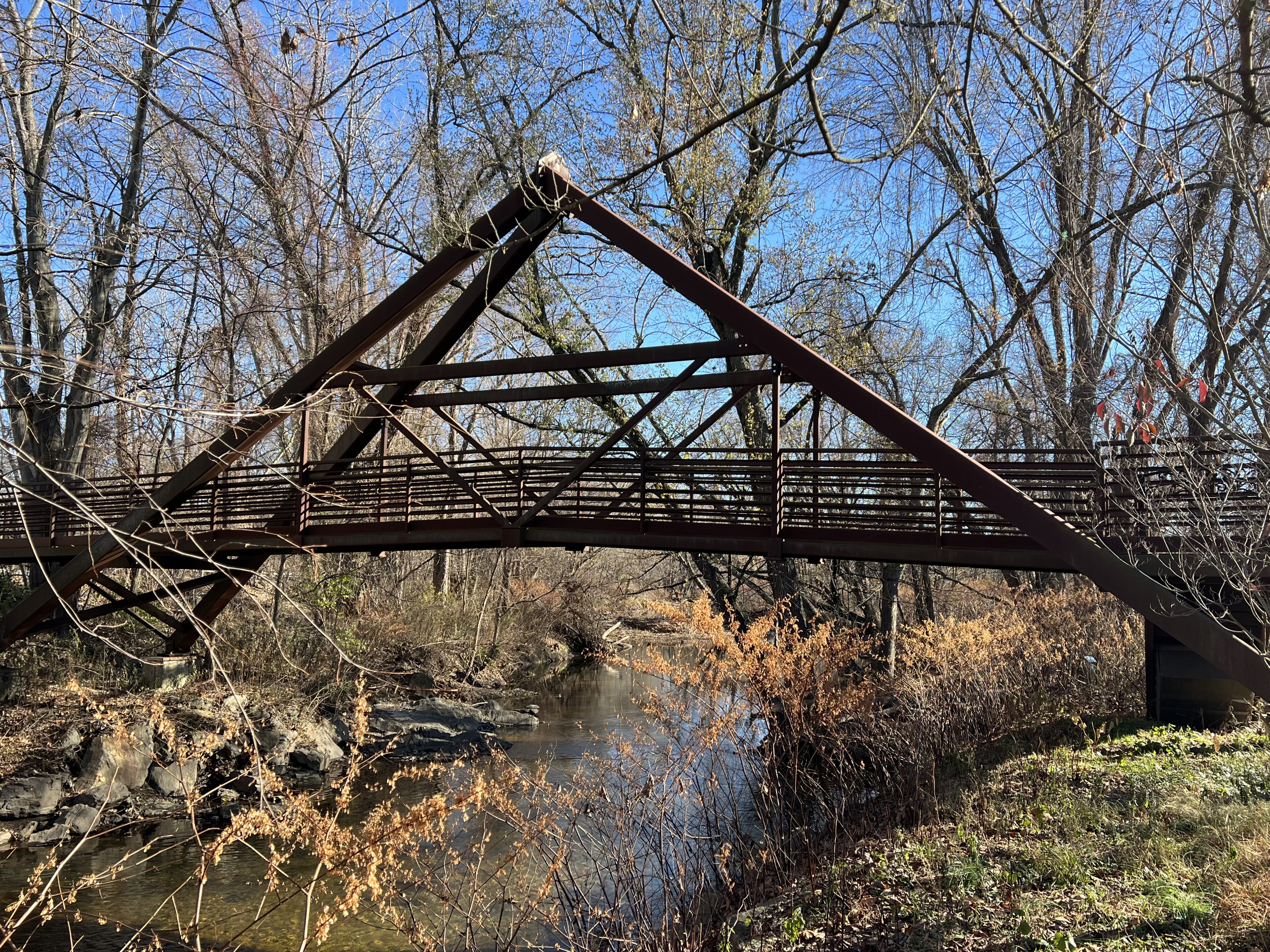
Bedoukian Bridge at the Still River Greenway

- John Oliver Memorial Sewer Plant
- Still River Greenway
