= Great Plain, Danbury, Connecticut =

Former farming community in Danbury, Connecticut, United States

Great Plain, Connecticut
- Unincorporated area
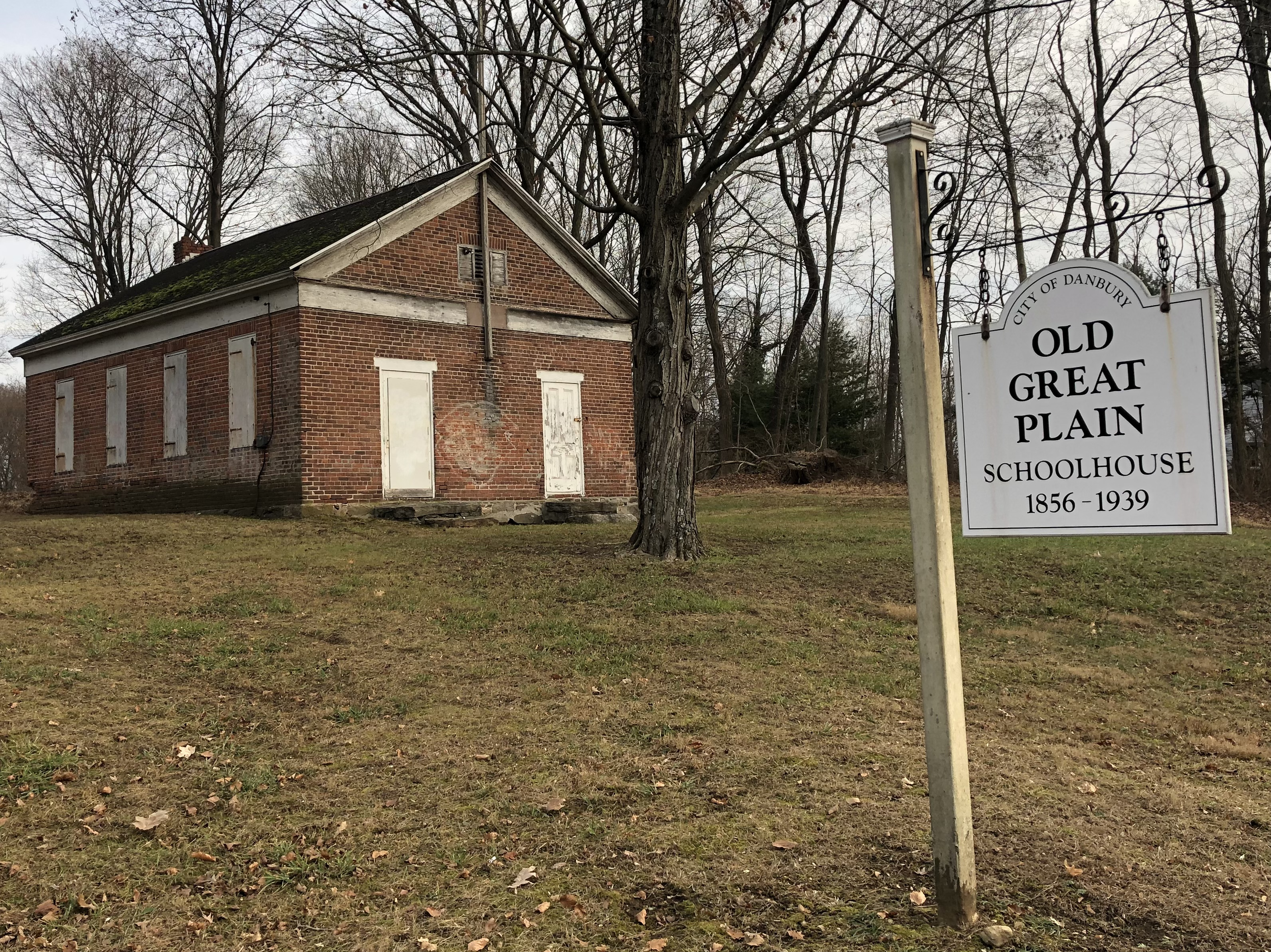
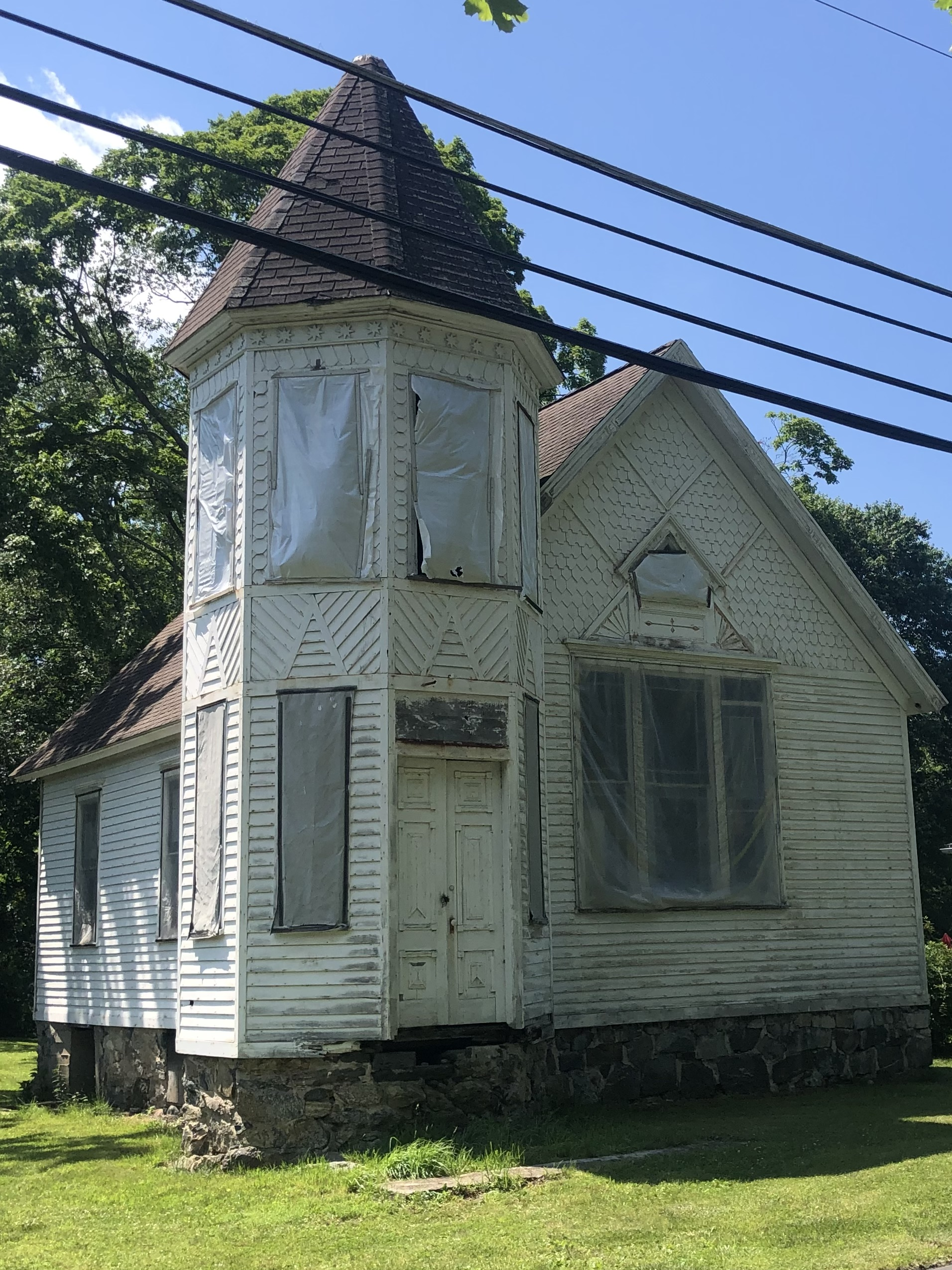
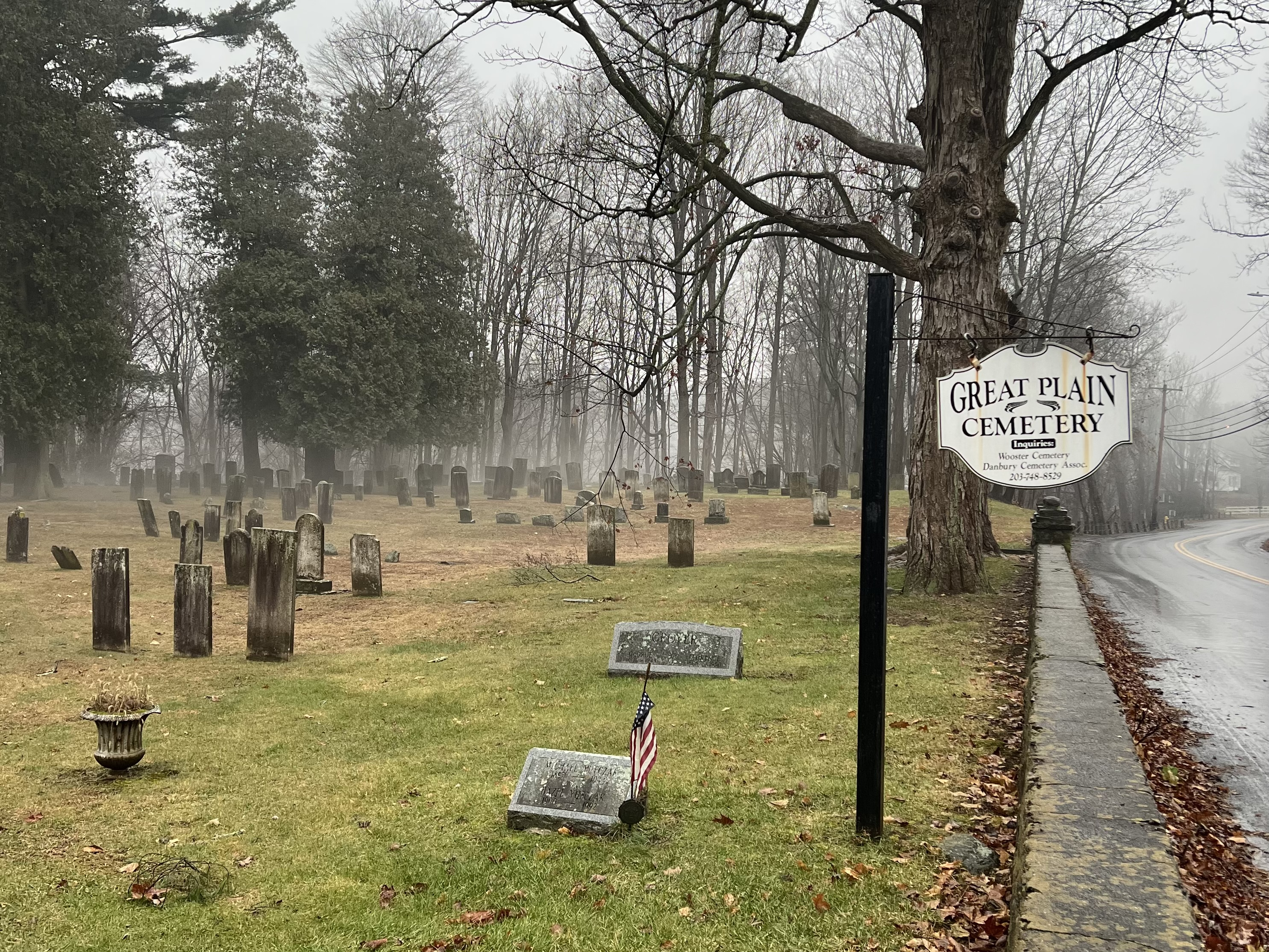
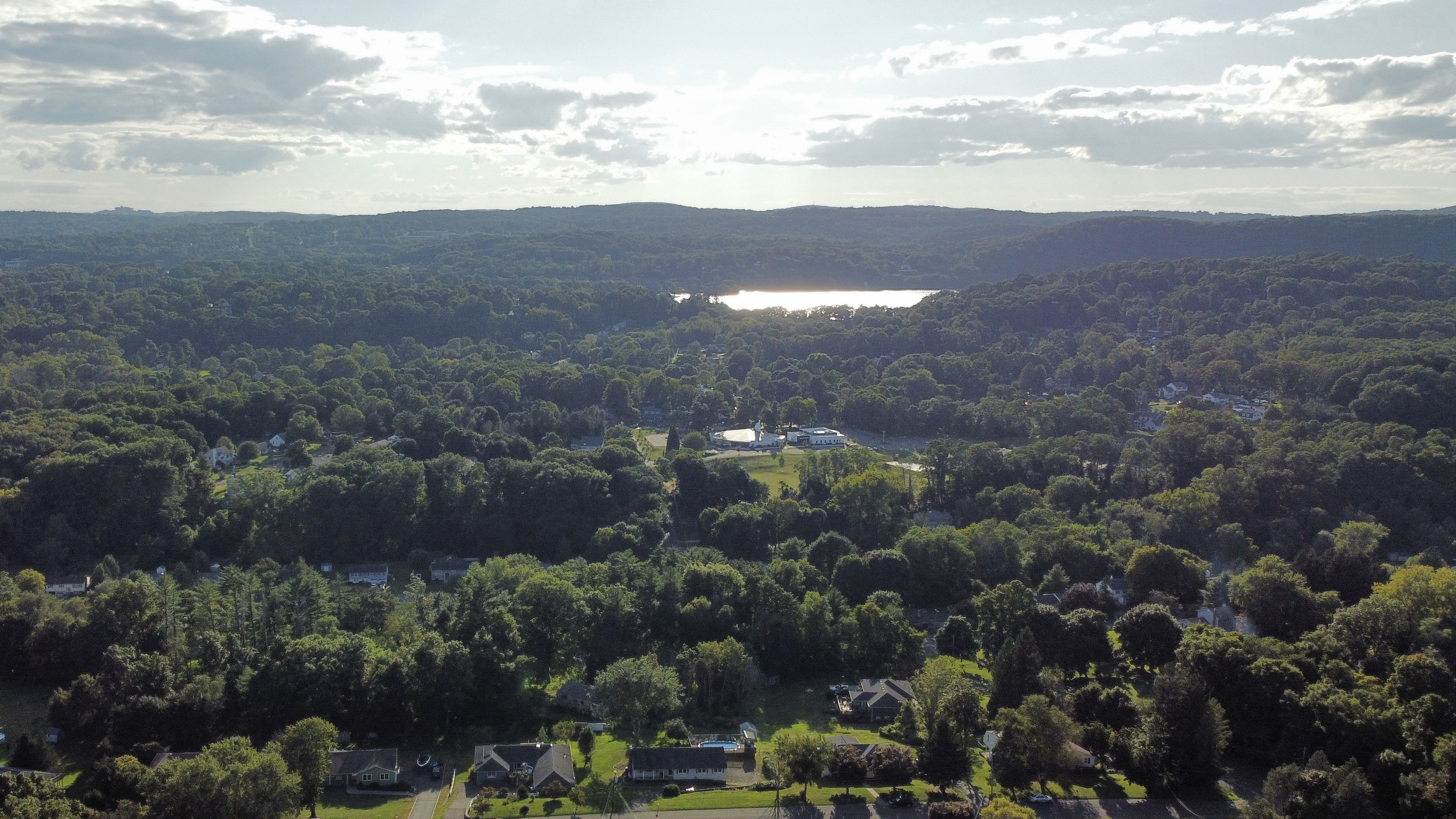
- Old Great Plain Schoolhouse, Great Plain Union Chapel, Great Plain Cemetery, and aerial view

- Location in Connecticut Location in the United States
- Coordinates: 41°25′17.69″N 73°26′20.18″W
- Country: United States
- U.S. state: Connecticut
- County: Fairfield
- Region: Western CT
- City: Danbury

Great Plain is an unincorporated area in the City of Danbury, Fairfield County, Connecticut. A former farming community, only remnants exist of the once thriving agricultural hub. It is located in the northeast section of the city, sharing a border with the Beaverbrook area of Danbury and Brookfield, CT.

== History ==
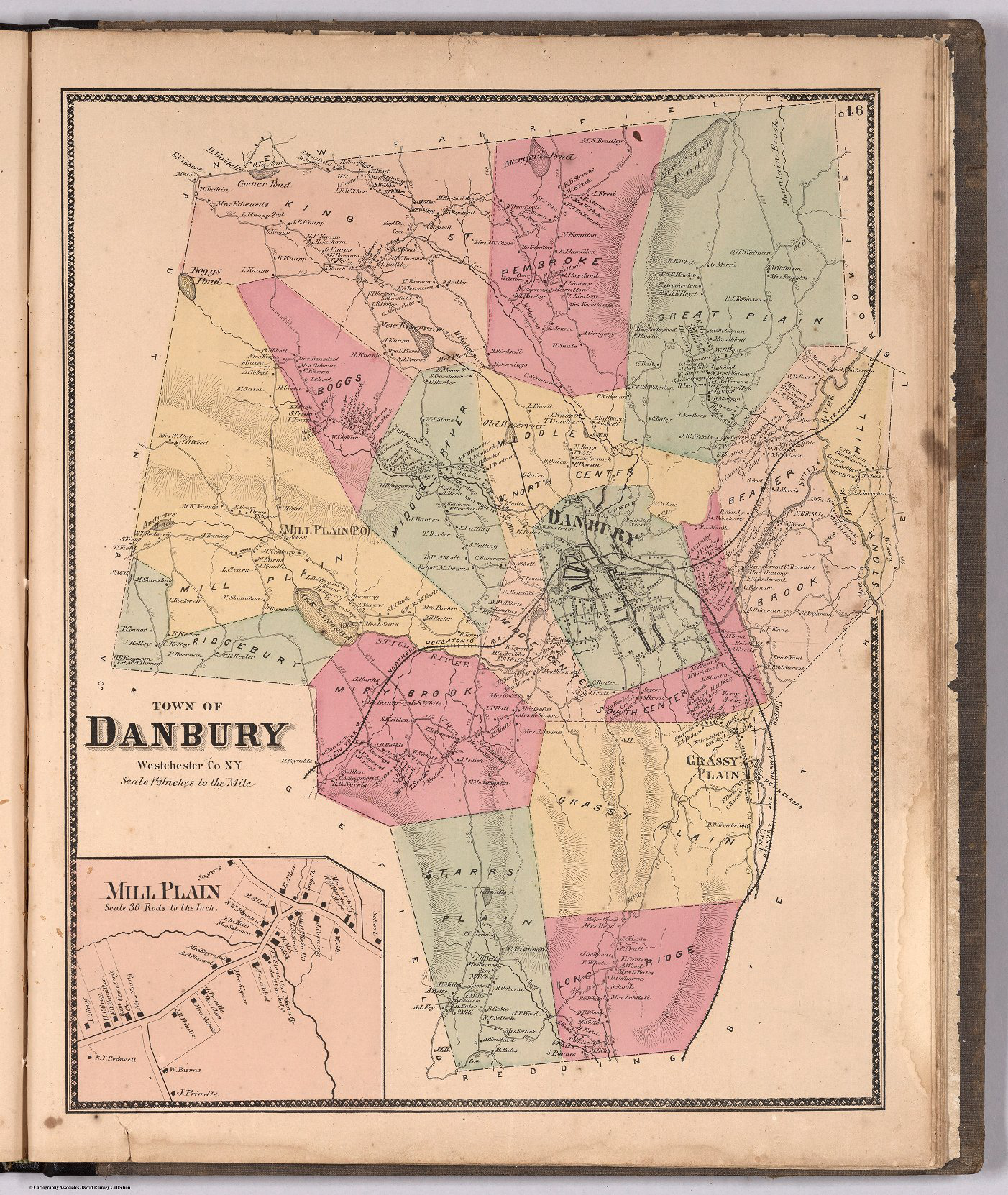
Great Plain is mapped out on the upper right-hand side

Named for its broad expanse, Great Plain gained a reputation for fruitful fields and prosperous farmers.

The original Mallory Hat Company, which would become one of Danbury's most prominent hat manufacturers, was established in Great Plain in 1823. At this time, Danbury was in the early stages of becoming the "Hat City of the World" The small shop operated at Great Plain until the 1850s, when Mallory decided to relocate downtown.

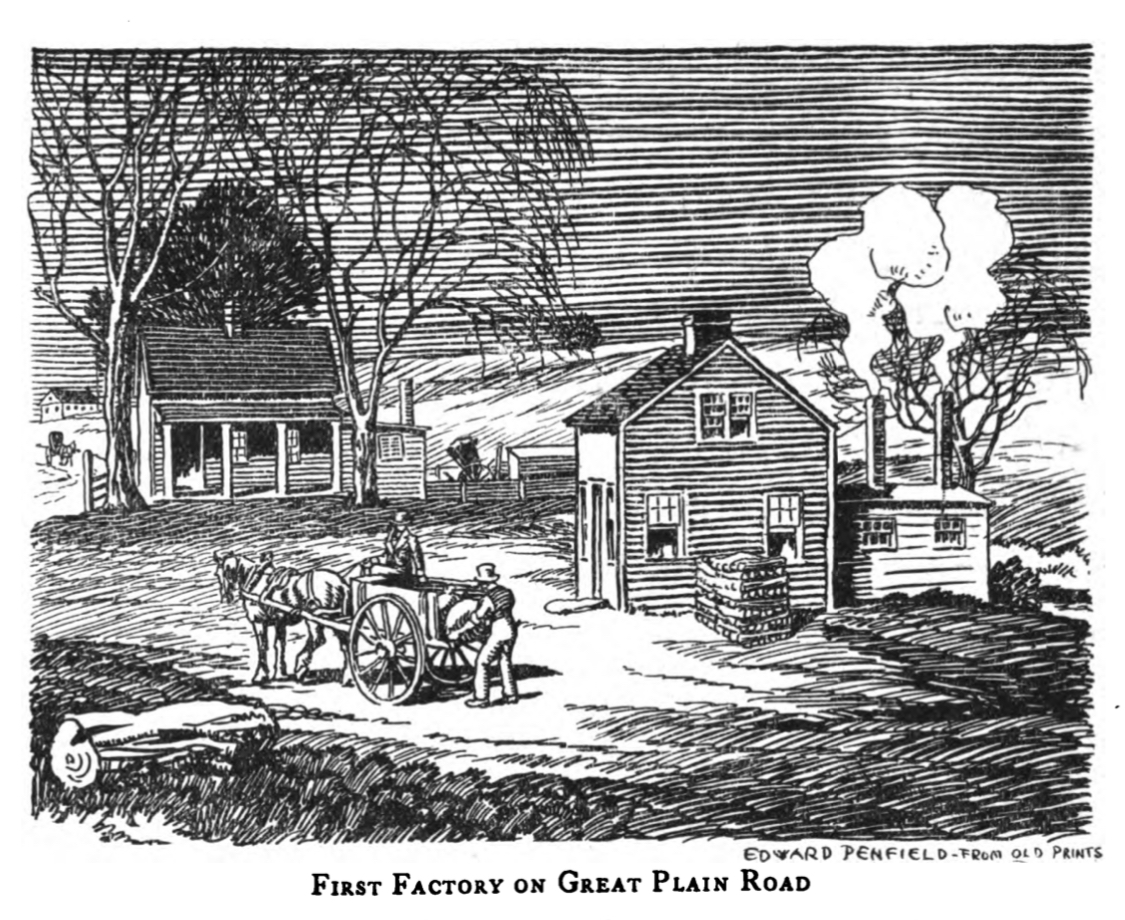

=== Chapel ===
Great Plain Union Chapel was constructed in 1890. The highly ornamented Victorian Vernacular style building cost $1,100 to build. For a time, it was the centerpiece of the neighborhood but eventually began deteriorating. It has been noted as in need of repair dating back to 1961, when there was an effort to restore the building. Despite past efforts, it remains dilapidated today.

=== Schoolhouse ===
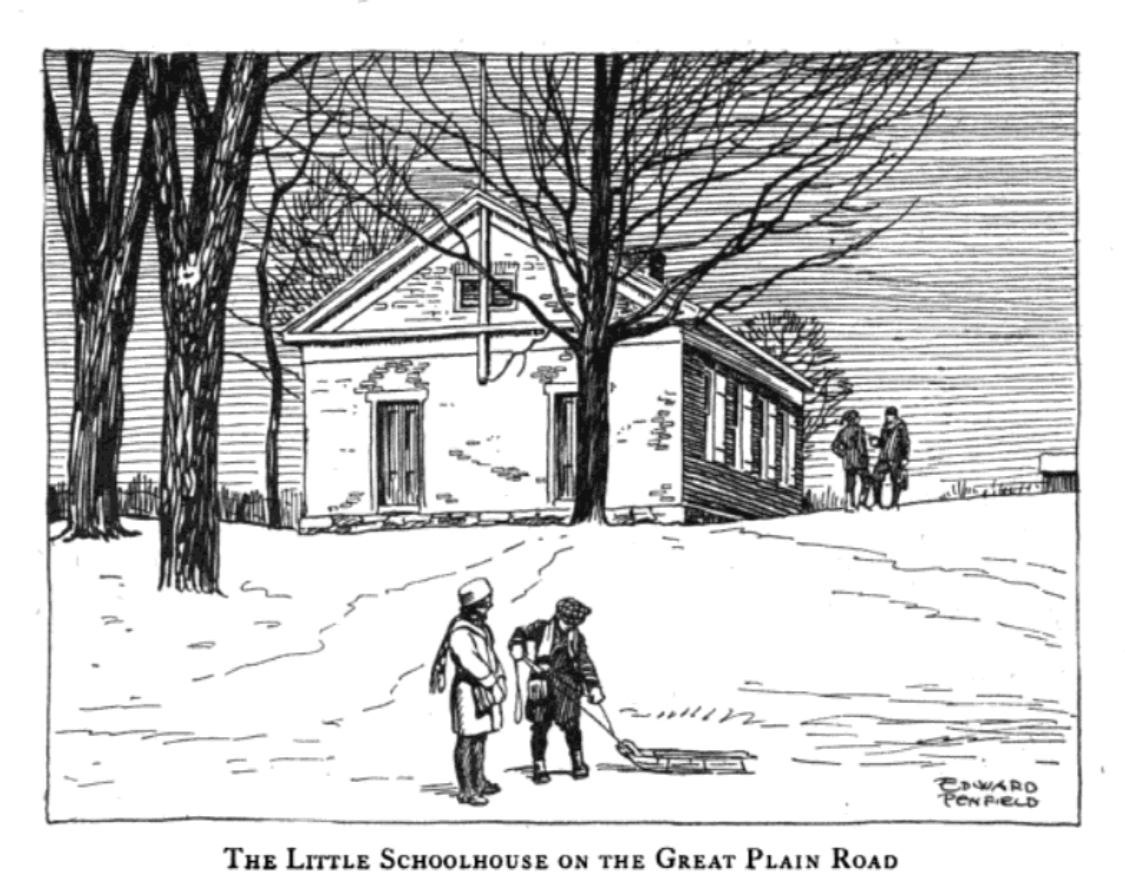

Built in 1856, the Greek Revival one-room schoolhouse served the students of the Great Plain community until the 1940s. In 1954 the City of Danbury transferred the building to the Great Plain District Association, a neighborhood organization with plans to convert it into a community center. In February 1955, 75 residents from the neighborhood joined in a housewarming for its opening. The Old Great Plain School is one of only three one-room schoolhouses still standing in Danbury.

== Candlewood Lake ==
=== Communities ===
- Aqua Vista
- Boulder Ridge
- Candlewood Vista
- Cedar Heights
- Driftwood Point
- Hawthorne Terrace
- Lattins Landing
- Pleasant Acres
- Snug Harbor
- Ta'agan Point

== Images ==
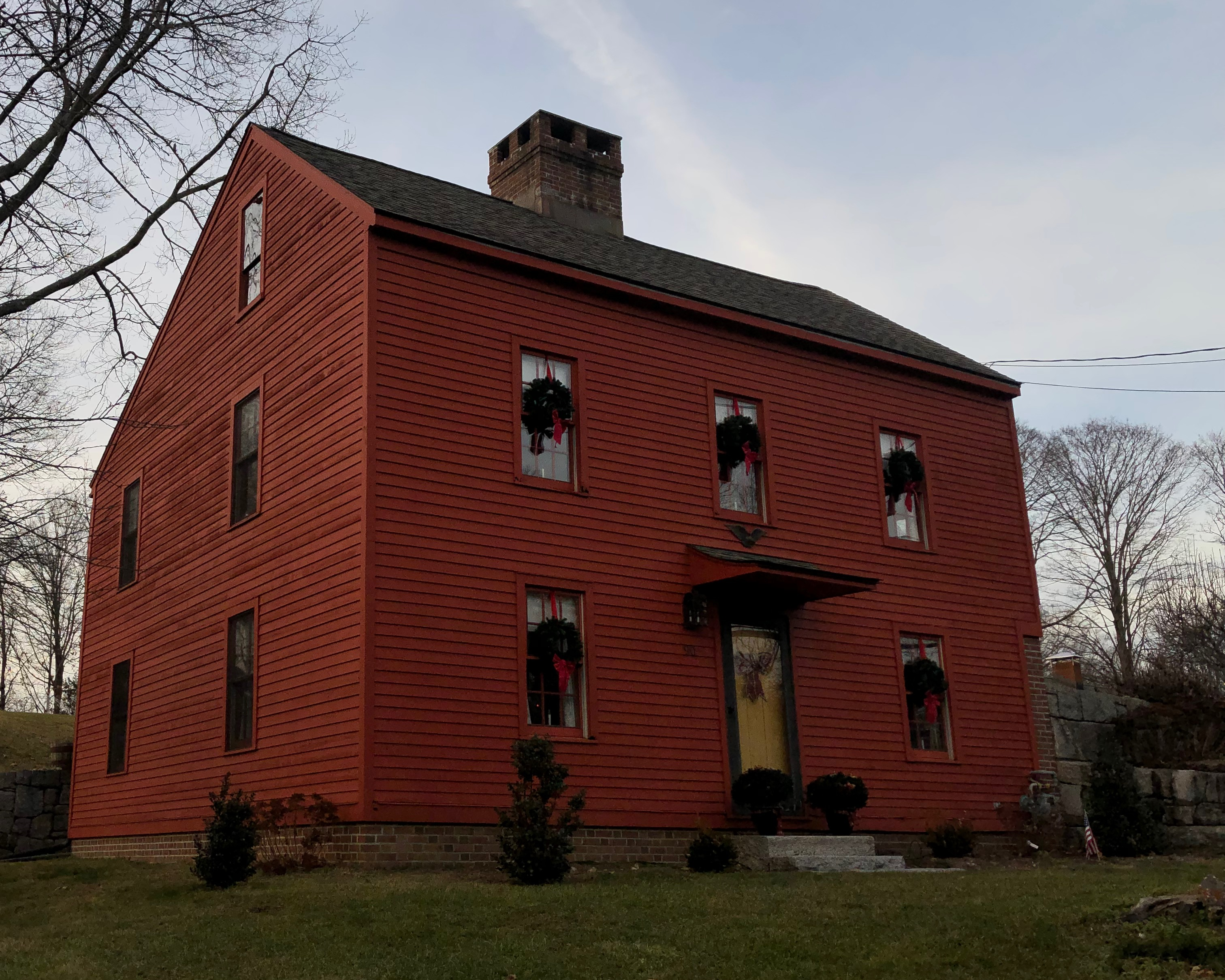
Thomas Judd House (c. 1770)

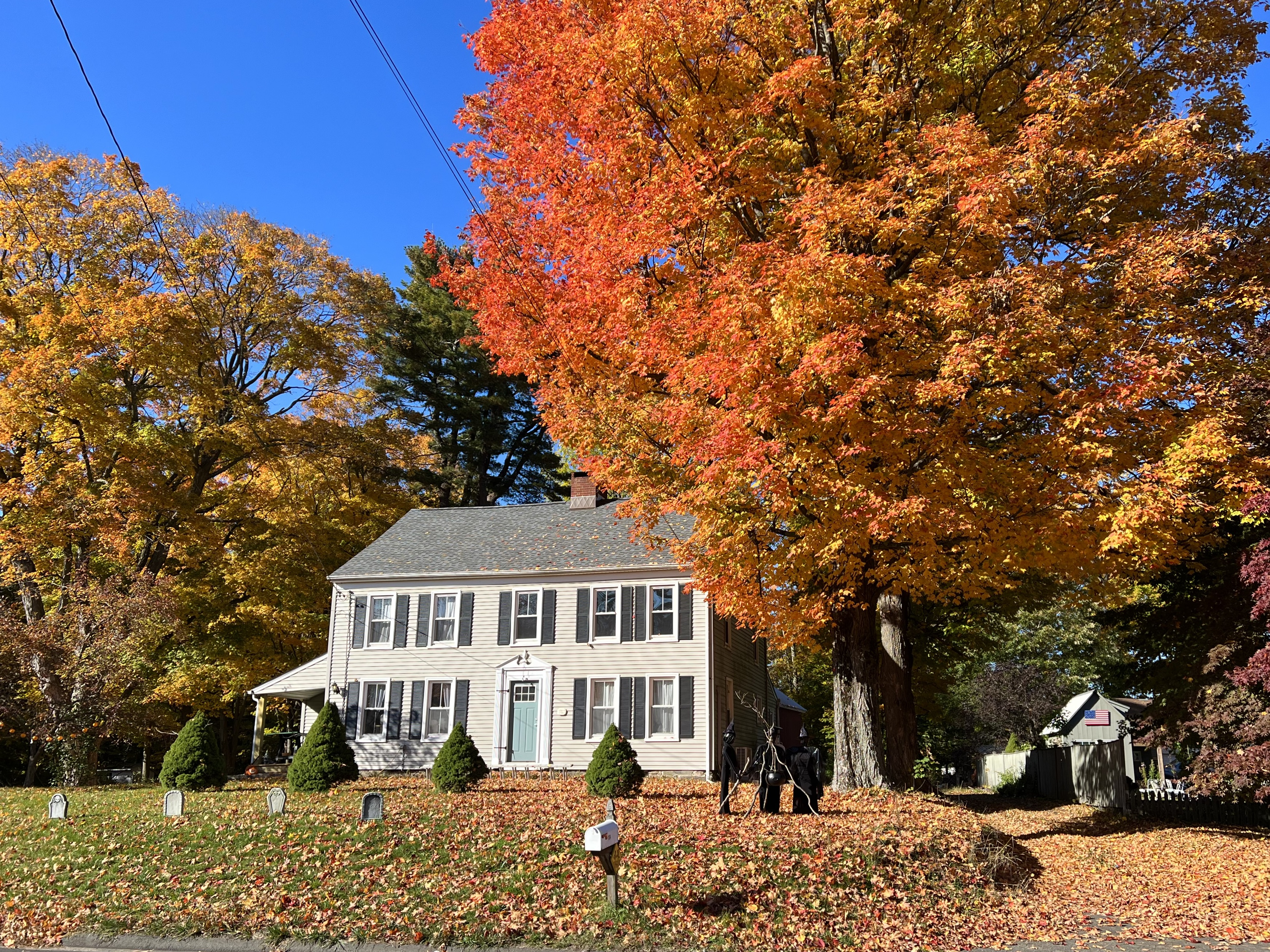
Ezra Mallory House (c. 1785)

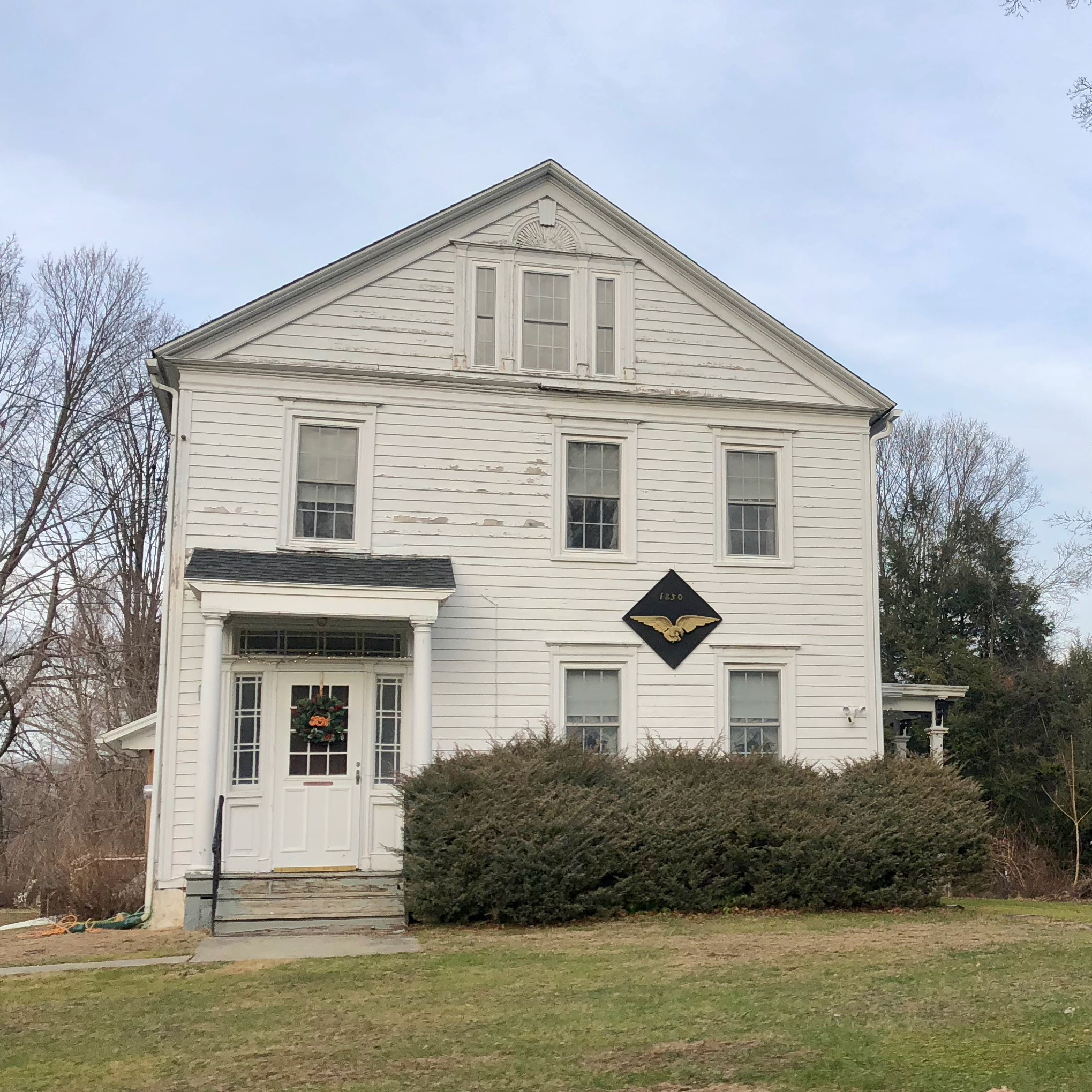
Daniel Comstock House (c. 1830)

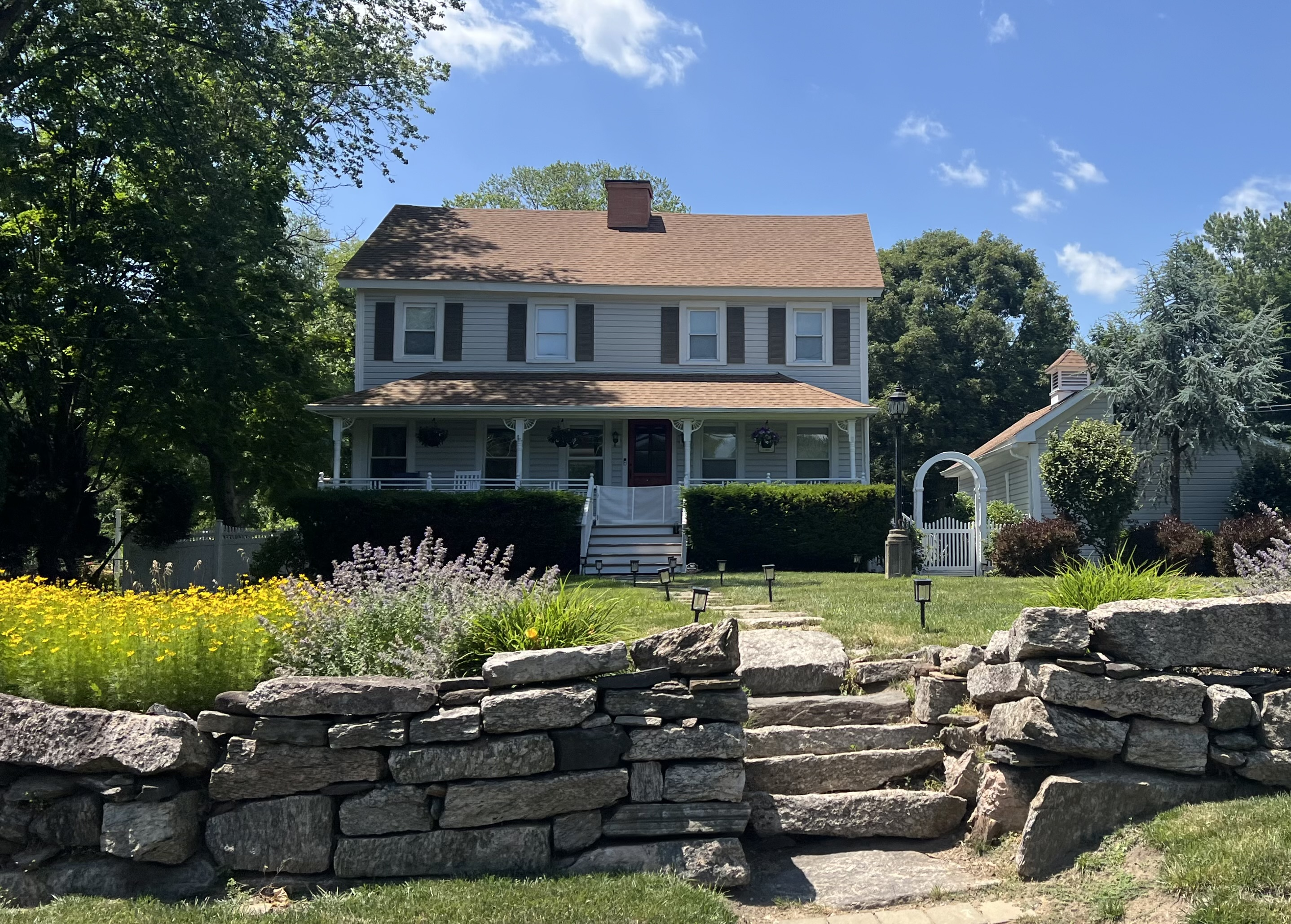
Epaphras Stevens House (c. 1833)
