= Connecticut =

U.S. state

- State
- Flag Seal
- Nicknames: The Constitution State (official); The Nutmeg State; The Provisions State; The Land of Steady Habits
- Mottoes: Qui transtulit sustinet (Latin); He who transplanted still sustains
- Anthem: "Yankee Doodle"
- Location of Connecticut within the United States
- Country: United States
- Before statehood: Connecticut Colony
- Admitted to the Union: January 9, 1788 (5th)
- Capital: Hartford
- Largest city: Bridgeport
- Largest county or equivalent: Capitol (Hartford County)
- Largest metro and urban areas: New York (combined); Greater Hartford (metro and urban)

Government
  - Governor: Ned Lamont (D)
  - Lieutenant Governor: Susan Bysiewicz (D)
- Legislature: General Assembly
  - Upper house: Senate
  - Lower house: House of Representatives
- Judiciary: Connecticut Supreme Court
- U.S. senators: Richard Blumenthal (D); Chris Murphy (D)
- U.S. House delegation: 5 Democrats (list)

Area
  - Total: 5,543 sq mi (14,356 km^{2})
  - Land: 4,849 sq mi (12,559 km^{2})
  - Water: 698 sq mi (1,809 km^{2}) 12.6%
  - Rank: 48th

Dimensions
  - Length: 70 mi (113 km)
  - Width: 110 mi (177 km)
- Elevation: 490 ft (150 m)
- Highest elevation (Massachusetts border on south slope of Mount Frissell (Note: Elevation adjusted to North American Vertical Datum of 1988)): 2,379 ft (725 m)
- Lowest elevation (Long Island Sound): 0 ft (0 m)

Population (2025)
  - Total: ▲3,688,496
  - Rank: 29th
  - Density: 750/sq mi (288/km^{2})
  - Rank: 4th
  - Median household income: $91,700 (2023)
  - Income rank: 10th
- Demonyms: Nutmegger; (colloquial): Connecticuter; Connecticutian

Language
  - Official language: None
- Time zone: UTC−05:00 (Eastern)
  - Summer (DST): UTC−04:00 (EDT)
- USPS abbreviation: CT
- ISO 3166 code: US-CT
- Traditional abbreviation: Conn.
- Latitude: 40°58′ N to 42°03′ N
- Longitude: 71°47′ W to 73°44′ W
- Website: ct.gov

Connecticut (/kəˈnɛtɪkət/ kə-NET-ih-kət) is a state in the New England region of the Northeastern United States. It borders Rhode Island to the east, Massachusetts to the north, New York to the west, and Long Island Sound to the south. Its capital is Hartford, and its most populous city is Bridgeport. Connecticut lies between the major hubs of New York City and Boston along the Northeast Corridor, where the New York metropolitan area, which includes four of Connecticut's seven largest cities, extends into the southwestern part of the state. Connecticut is the third-smallest state by area after Rhode Island and Delaware, and the 29th-most populous with more than 3.6 million residents as of 2024, ranking it fourth among the most densely populated U.S. states.

The state is named after the Connecticut River, the longest in New England, which roughly bisects the state and drains into the Long Island Sound between the towns of Old Saybrook and Old Lyme. The name of the river is in turn derived from anglicized spellings of Quinnetuket, a Mohegan-Pequot word for "long tidal river". Before the arrival of the first European settlers, the region was inhabited by various Algonquian tribes. In 1633, the Dutch West India Company established a small, short-lived settlement called House of Hope in Hartford. Half of Connecticut was initially claimed by the Dutch colony New Netherland, which included much of the land between the Connecticut and Delaware Rivers, although the first major settlements were established by the English around the same time. Thomas Hooker led a band of followers from the Massachusetts Bay Colony to form the Connecticut Colony, while other settlers from Massachusetts founded the Saybrook Colony and the New Haven Colony; both had merged into the first by 1664.

Connecticut's environmental history is shaped by Indigenous land stewardship, colonial displacement, industrial development, and modern environmental regulation. The Pequot and Mohegan peoples maintained sustainable relationships with the land prior to colonization, which were later disrupted by forced removal and legal restrictions on land and sovereignty. Industrial growth in the 19th and 20th centuries concentrated manufacturing along river systems, contributing to pollution and environmental inequality. In response, modern state and federal environmental policies have been developed to regulate pollution and protect natural resources.

Connecticut's official nickname, the "Constitution State", refers to the Fundamental Orders adopted by the Connecticut Colony in 1639, which is considered by some to be the first written constitution in Western history. As one of the Thirteen Colonies that rejected British rule during the American Revolution, Connecticut was influential in the development of the federal government of the United States. In 1787, Roger Sherman and Oliver Ellsworth, state delegates to the Constitutional Convention, proposed a compromise between the Virginia and New Jersey Plans; its bicameral structure for Congress, with a respectively proportional and equal representation of the states in the House of Representatives and Senate, was adopted and remains to this day. In January 1788, Connecticut became the fifth state to ratify the Constitution.

Connecticut is a developed and affluent state, performing well on the Human Development Index and on different metrics of income except for equality. It is home to a number of prestigious educational institutions, including Yale University in New Haven, as well as other liberal arts colleges and private boarding schools in and around the "Knowledge Corridor". Due to its geography, Connecticut has maintained a strong maritime tradition; the United States Coast Guard Academy is located in New London by the Thames River. The state is also associated with the aerospace industry through major companies Pratt & Whitney and Sikorsky Aircraft headquartered in East Hartford and Stratford, respectively. Historically a manufacturing center for arms, hardware, and timepieces, Connecticut transitioned into an economy based on the financial, insurance, and real estate sectors; many multinational firms providing such services can be found concentrated in the state capital of Hartford and along the Gold Coast in Fairfield County.

== History ==
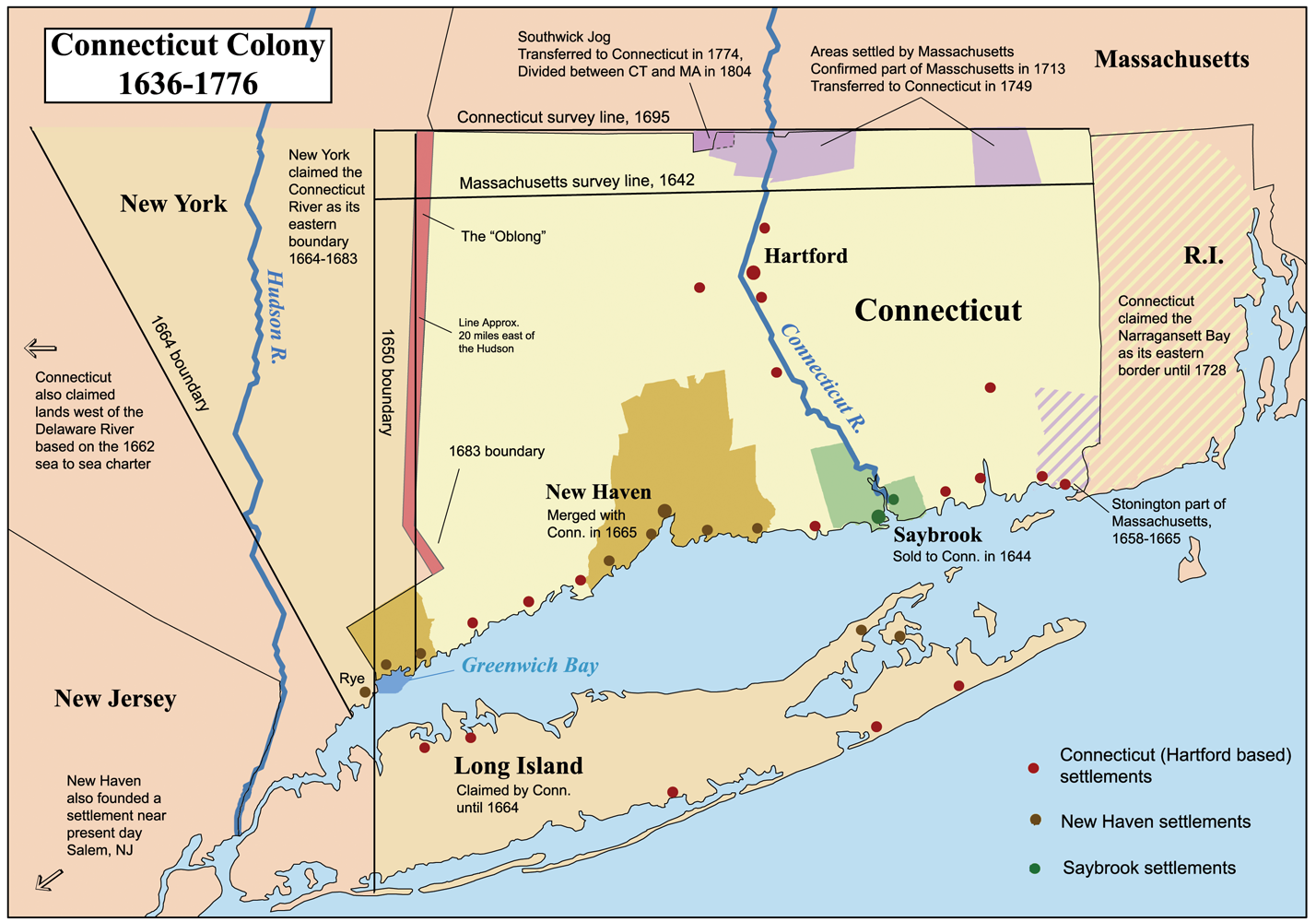
A map of the Connecticut, New Haven, and Saybrook colonies

=== First people ===
The name Connecticut is derived from the Mohegan-Pequot word that has been translated as "long tidal river" and "upon the long river", both referring to the Connecticut River. Evidence of human presence in the Connecticut region dates to as far back as 10,000 years ago. Stone tools were used for hunting, fishing, and woodworking. Semi-nomadic in lifestyle, these peoples moved seasonally to take advantage of various resources in the area. They shared languages based on Algonquian. The Connecticut region was inhabited by many Native American tribes that can be grouped into the Nipmuc, the Sequin or "River Indians" (which included the Tunxis, Schaghticoke, Podunk, Wangunk, Hammonasset, and Quinnipiac), the Mattabesec or "Wappinger Confederacy" and the Pequot-Mohegan. Some of these groups still reside in Connecticut, including the Mohegans, the Pequots, and the Paugusetts.

In the early 17th century, about 8,000 Pequots lived in southeastern Connecticut between the Thames and Pawcatuck rivers, a number roughly halved by the smallpox epidemic of 1633–34, and 1,500 to 2,500 Mohegans lived west of the Thames. The Mohegan and Pequot economies combined hunting, shellfishing, gathering, and maize agriculture in which corn, beans, and squash were interplanted. Controlled burns and seasonal movement were used to manage resources. Wampum made from quahog and whelk shells served as currency and as a record of agreements.

=== Colonial period ===
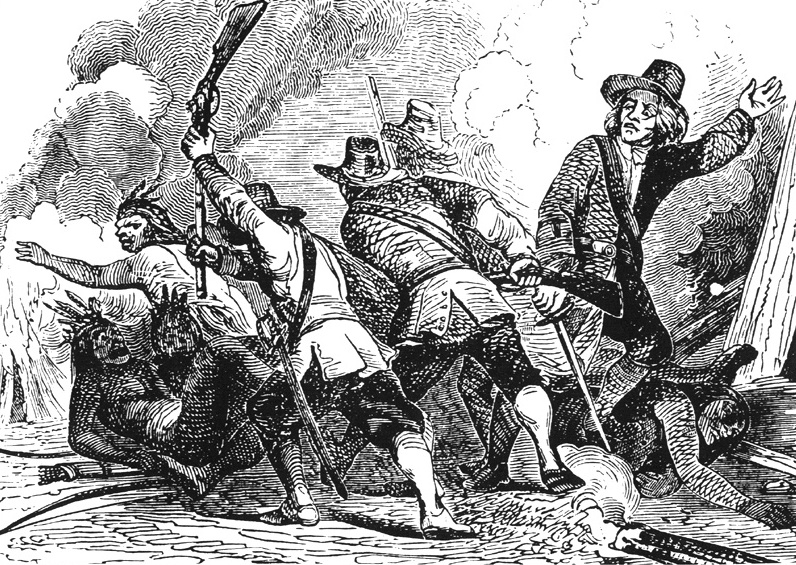
Pequot War

Dutchman Adriaen Block was the first European explorer in Connecticut. He explored the region in 1614. Dutch fur traders then sailed up the Connecticut River, calling it Versche Rivier ("Fresh River") and building a fort at Dutch Point in Hartford, which they named "House of Hope" (Dutch: Huis van Hoop).

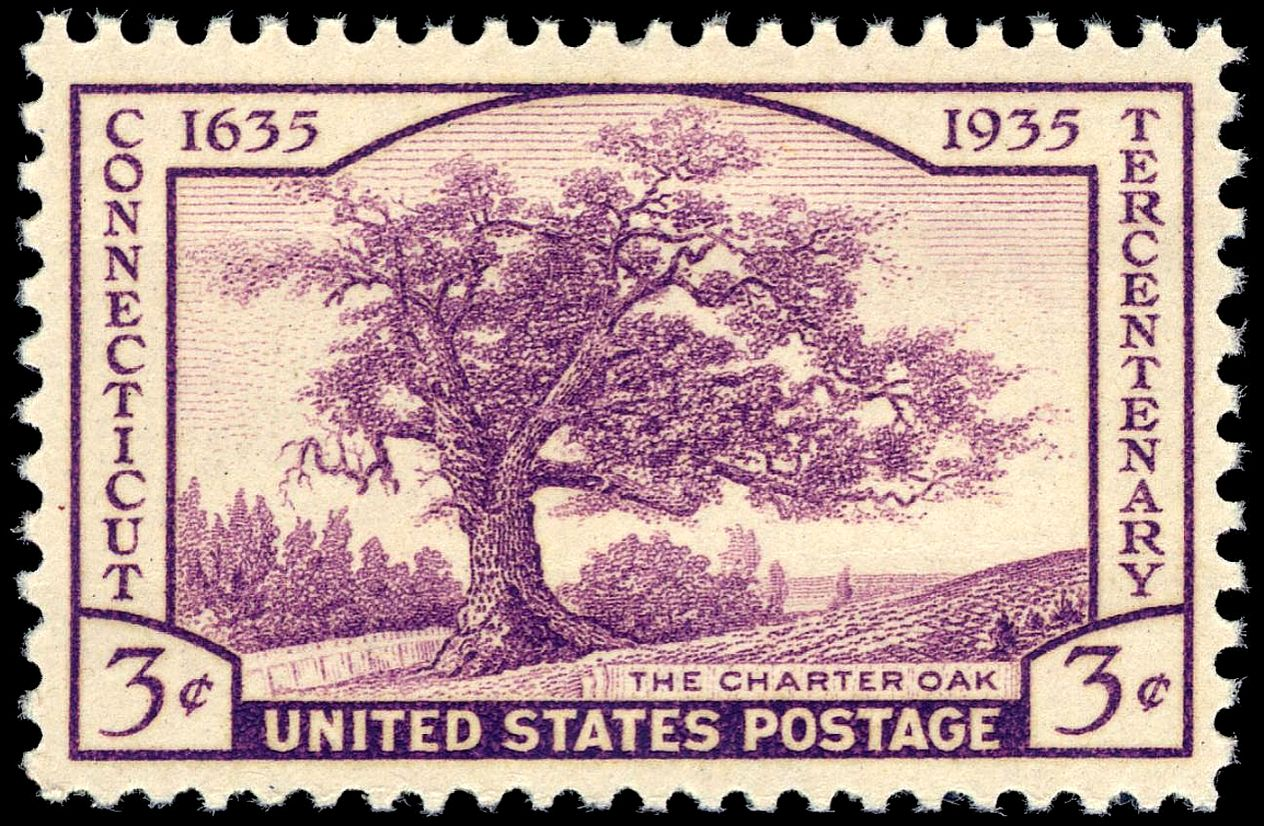
On April 26, 1935, the U.S. Post Office issued a postage stamp commemorating the 300th anniversary of the settlement of the Connecticut colony.

The Connecticut Colony originally consisted of several smaller settlements in Windsor, Wethersfield, Saybrook, Hartford, and New Haven. The first English settlers came in 1633 and settled at Windsor, then at Wethersfield the following year. John Winthrop the Younger of Massachusetts received a commission to create Saybrook Colony at the mouth of the Connecticut River in 1635.

A large group of Puritans arrived in 1636 from Massachusetts Bay Colony, led by Thomas Hooker, who established the Connecticut Colony at Hartford. The Fundamental Orders of Connecticut were adopted in January 1639, and have been described as the first constitutional document in America.

The Quinnipiack Colony was established by John Davenport, Theophilus Eaton, and others at New Haven in March 1638. The New Haven Colony had its own constitution called "The Fundamental Agreement of the New Haven Colony", signed on June 4, 1639.

Each settlement was an independent political entity, established without official sanction of the English Crown. In 1662, Winthrop traveled to England and obtained a charter from Charles II which united the settlements of Connecticut. Historically significant colonial settlements included Windsor (1633), Wethersfield (1634), Saybrook (1635), Hartford (1636), New Haven (1638), Fairfield (1639), Guilford (1639), Milford (1639), Stratford (1639), Farmington (1640), Stamford (1641), and New London (1646).

The Pequot War marked the first significant clash between colonists and Native Americans in New England. The Pequot had been aggressively extending their area of control at the expense of the Wampanoag to the north, Narragansett (east), Connecticut River Valley Algonquian tribes and the Mohegan (west), and Lenape Algonquian people (south). Meanwhile, the Pequot had been reacting with increasing aggression to colonial territorial expansion. In response to the 1636 murder of an English privateer and his crew, followed by the murder of a trader, colonists raided a Pequot village on Block Island. The Pequots laid siege to Saybrook Colony's garrison that autumn, then raided Wethersfield in the spring of 1637. Organizing a band of militia and allies from the Mohegan and Narragansett tribes, colonists declared war and attacked a Pequot village on the Mystic River. Death toll estimates range between 300 and 700 Pequots. After suffering another major loss at a battle in Fairfield, the Pequots sued for peace.

The Mashantucket Pequot Nation, descendants of the Pequot people of southern New England, experienced significant population loss due to violence and disease in the early seventeenth century. In the aftermath, Pequot leaders sued for peace, resulting in the Treaty of Hartford, which divided the surviving Pequots among the Narragansett and Mohegan tribes and forbade them from being called "Pequot" or returning to their homeland. Not until 1651 were surviving Pequots permitted to resettle on 500 acres of their former land.

A dispute over roughly 20,000 acres that the Mohegans said the colony had reserved for them became Mohegan Indians v. Connecticut, the first Indigenous land claim litigated before an English court. A royal commission ruled for the Mohegans in 1705; Connecticut appealed, and after further commissions in 1738 and 1743 the Privy Council dismissed the case in 1773.

Connecticut's original Charter in 1662 granted it all the land to the "South Sea"—that is, to the Pacific Ocean. The Hartford Treaty with the Dutch was signed on September 19, 1650, but never ratified by the British, stated the western boundary of Connecticut ran north from Greenwich Bay for a distance of 20 miles (32 km), "provided the said line come not within 10 miles [16 km] of Hudson River". This agreement was observed by both sides until war erupted between England and The Netherlands in 1652. Conflict continued concerning colonial limits until the Duke of York captured New Netherland in 1664.

Most Colonial royal grants were for long east–west strips. Connecticut took its grant seriously and established a ninth county between the Susquehanna River and Delaware River named Westmoreland County. This resulted in the brief Pennamite-Yankee Wars with Pennsylvania.

Yale College was established in 1701, providing Connecticut with an important institution to educate clergy and civil leaders. The Congregational church dominated religious life in the colony and, by extension, town affairs in many parts.

With more than 600 miles (970 km) of coastline including along its navigable rivers, Connecticut developed the antecedents of a maritime tradition during its colonial years that would later produce booms in shipbuilding, marine transport, naval support, seafood production, and leisure boating.

Historical records list the Tryall as the first vessel built in Connecticut Colony, in 1649 at a site on the Connecticut River in modern Wethersfield. In the two decades leading up to 1776 and the American Revolution, Connecticut boatyards launched about 100 sloops, schooners and brigs according to a database of U.S. customs records maintained online by the Mystic Seaport Museum, the largest being the 180-ton Patient Mary launched in New Haven in 1763. The New London Harbor Lighthouse was constructed in 1760 at the mouth of the Thames River as Connecticut's first lighthouse.

==== American Revolution ====
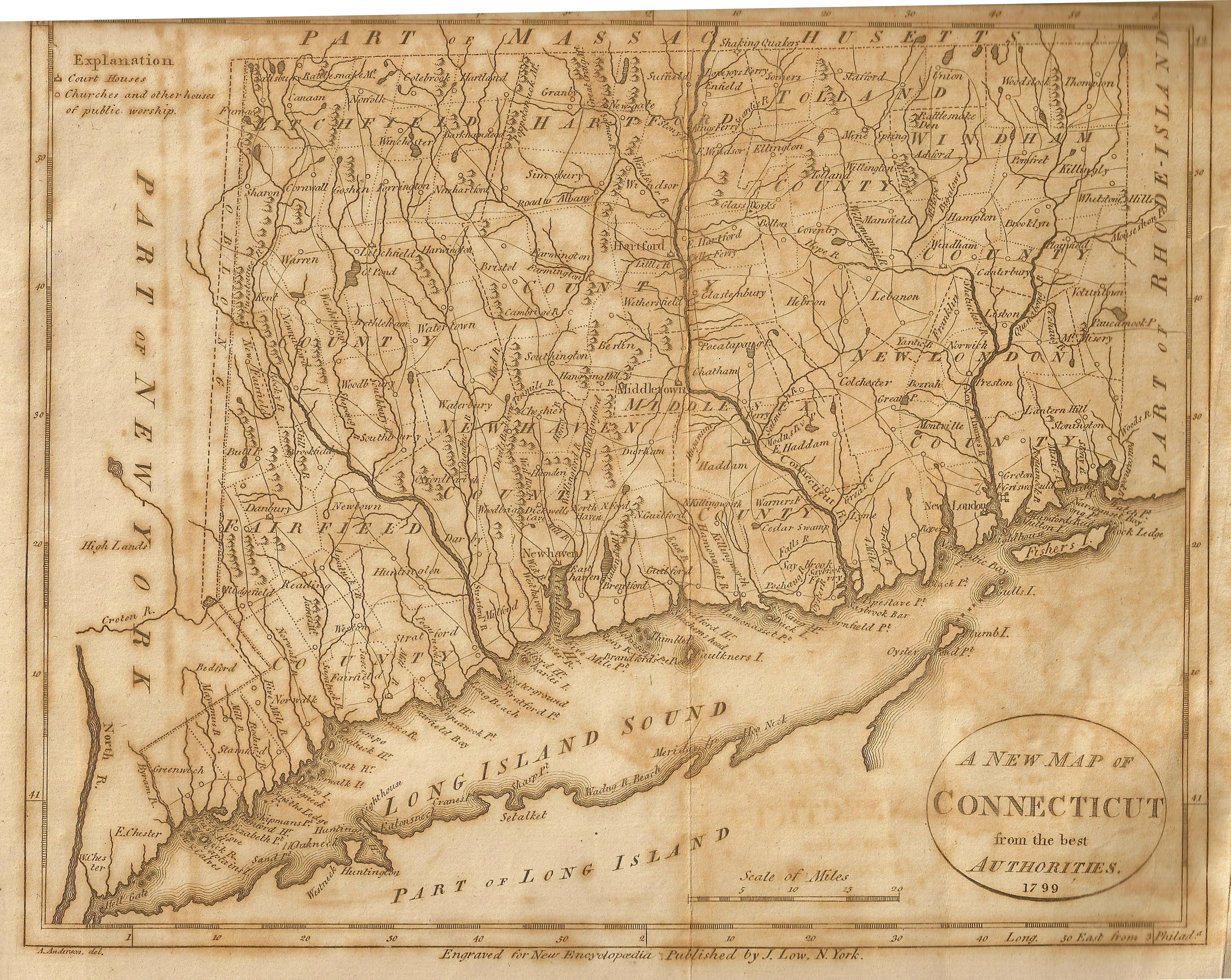
A 1799 map of Connecticut which shows The Oblong, from Low's Encyclopaedia

Connecticut designated four delegates to the Second Continental Congress who signed the Declaration of Independence: Samuel Huntington, Roger Sherman, William Williams, and Oliver Wolcott. Connecticut's legislature authorized the outfitting of six new regiments in 1775, in the wake of the clashes between British regulars and Massachusetts militia at Lexington and Concord. There were some 1,200 Connecticut troops on hand at the Battle of Bunker Hill in June 1775. In 1775, David Bushnell invented the Turtle which the following year launched the first submarine attack in history, unsuccessfully against a British warship at anchor in New York Harbor.

In 1777, the British got word of Continental Army supplies in Danbury, and they landed an expeditionary force of some 2,000 troops in Westport. This force marched to Danbury, then destroyed homes and much of the depot. Continental Army troops and militia led by General David Wooster and General Benedict Arnold engaged them on their return march at Ridgefield in 1777. For the winter of 1778–79, General George Washington decided to split the Continental Army into three divisions encircling New York City, where British General Sir Henry Clinton had taken up winter quarters. Major General Israel Putnam chose Redding as the winter encampment quarters for some 3,000 regulars and militia under his command. The Redding encampment allowed Putnam's soldiers to guard the replenished supply depot in Danbury and to support any operations along Long Island Sound and the Hudson River Valley. Some of the men were veterans of the winter encampment at Valley Forge, Pennsylvania, the previous winter. Soldiers at the Redding camp endured supply shortages, cold temperatures, and significant snow, with some historians dubbing the encampment "Connecticut's Valley Forge".

The state was also the launching site for a number of raids against Long Island orchestrated by Samuel Holden Parsons and Benjamin Tallmadge, and provided soldiers and material for the war effort, especially to Washington's army outside New York City. General William Tryon raided the Connecticut coast in July 1779, focusing on New Haven, Norwalk, and Fairfield. New London and Groton Heights were raided in September 1781 by Benedict Arnold, who had turned traitor to the British.

At the outset of the American Revolution, the Continental Congress assigned Nathaniel Shaw Jr. of New London as its naval agent in charge of recruiting privateers to seize British vessels as opportunities presented, with nearly 50 operating out of the Thames River which eventually drew the reprisal from the British force led by Arnold.

=== Early statehood ===
==== Early national period and industrial revolution ====
Connecticut ratified the U.S. Constitution on January 9, 1788, becoming the fifth state.

The state prospered during the era following the American Revolution, as mills and textile factories were built and seaports flourished from trade and fisheries. After Congress established in 1790 the predecessor to the U.S. Revenue Cutter Service that would evolve into the U.S. Coast Guard, President Washington assigned Jonathan Maltbie as one of seven masters to enforce customs regulations, with Maltbie monitoring the southern New England coast with a 48-foot cutter sloop named Argus.

In 1786, Connecticut ceded territory to the U.S. government that became part of the Northwest Territory. The state retained land extending across the northern part of modern Ohio called the Connecticut Western Reserve. The Western Reserve section was settled largely by people from Connecticut, and they brought Connecticut place names to Ohio.

Connecticut made agreements with Pennsylvania and New York which extinguished the land claims within those states' boundaries and created the Connecticut Panhandle. The state then ceded the Western Reserve in 1800 to the federal government, which brought it to its existing boundaries (other than minor adjustments with Massachusetts).

=== Nineteenth century ===
For the first time in 1800, Connecticut shipwrights launched more than 100 vessels in a single year. Over the following decade up to the doorstep of renewed hostilities with Britain that sparked the War of 1812, Connecticut boatyards constructed close to 1,000 vessels, the most productive stretch of any decade in the nineteenth century.

During the war, the British launched raids in Stonington and Essex and blockaded vessels in the Thames River. Derby native Isaac Hull became Connecticut's best-known naval figure to win renown during the conflict, as captain of the USS Constitution.

The British blockade during the War of 1812 hurt exports and bolstered the influence of Federalists who opposed the war. The cessation of imports from Britain stimulated the construction of factories to manufacture textiles and machinery. Connecticut came to be recognized as a major center for manufacturing, due in part to the inventions of Eli Whitney and other early innovators of the Industrial Revolution.

The war led to the development of fast clippers that helped extend the reach of New England merchants to the Pacific and Indian oceans. The first half of the nineteenth century saw as well a rapid rise in whaling, with New London emerging as one of the New England industry's three biggest home ports after Nantucket and New Bedford.

The state was known for its political conservatism, typified by its Federalist party and the Yale College of Timothy Dwight. The foremost intellectuals were Dwight and Noah Webster, who compiled his great dictionary in New Haven. Religious tensions polarized the state, as the Congregational Church struggled to maintain traditional viewpoints, in alliance with the Federalists. The failure of the Hartford Convention in 1814 hurt the Federalist cause, with the Democratic-Republican Party gaining control in 1817.

Connecticut had been governed under the "Fundamental Orders" since 1639, but the state adopted a new constitution in 1818.

==== Civil war era ====
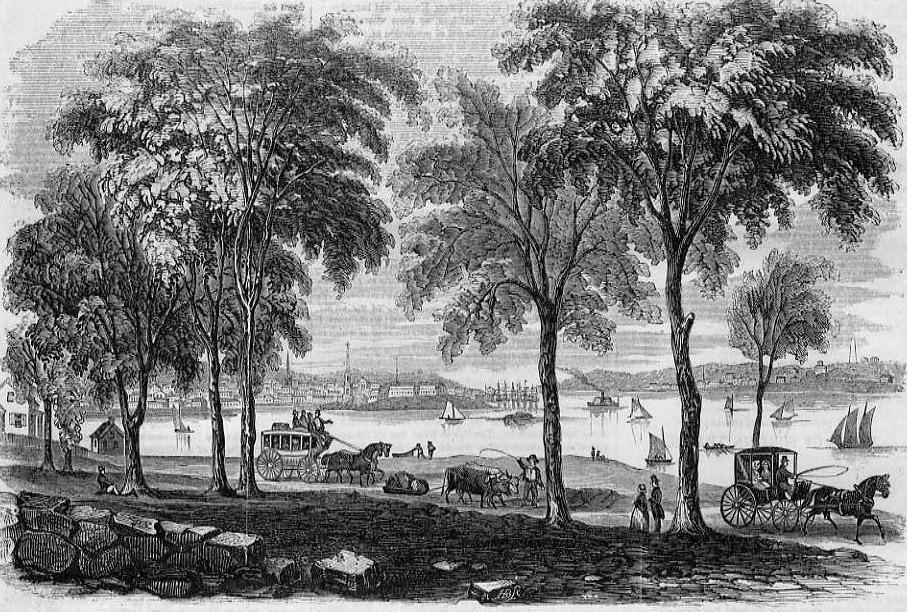
View of New London in 1854

Connecticut manufacturers played a major role in supplying the Union forces with weapons and supplies during the Civil War. The state furnished 55,000 men, formed into thirty full regiments of infantry, including two in the U.S. Colored Troops, with several Connecticut men becoming generals. The Navy attracted 250 officers and 2,100 men, and Glastonbury native Gideon Welles was Secretary of the Navy. James H. Ward of Hartford was the first U.S. Naval Officer killed in the Civil War. Connecticut casualties included 2,088 killed in combat, 2,801 dying from disease, and 689 dying in Confederate prison camps.

A surge of national unity in 1861 brought thousands flocking to the colors from every town and city. However, as the war became a crusade to end slavery, many Democrats (especially Irish Catholics) pulled back. The Democrats took a pro-slavery position and included many Copperheads willing to let the South secede. The intensely fought 1863 election for governor was narrowly won by the Republicans.

==== Second industrial revolution ====
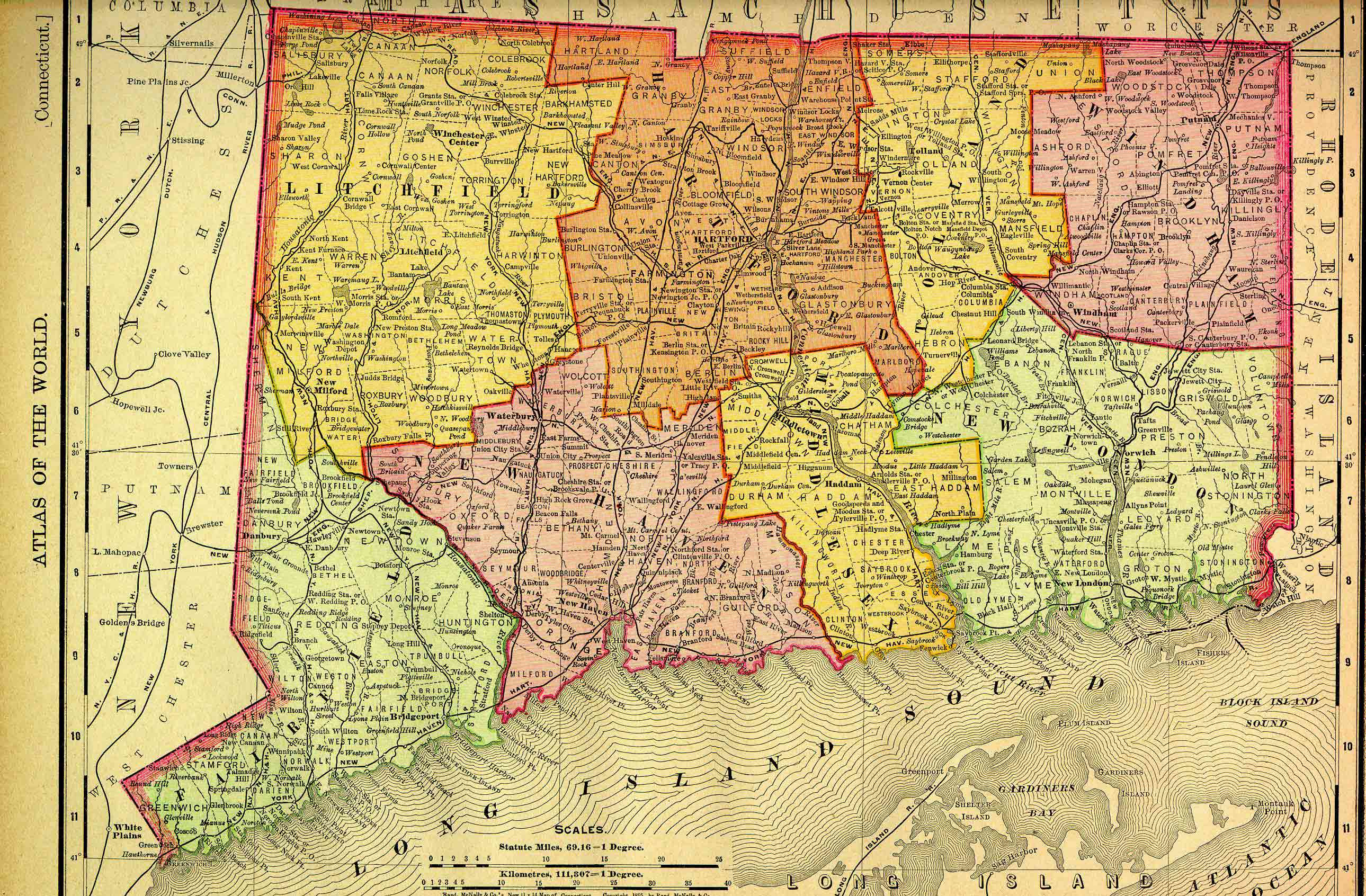
1895 map from Rand McNally

Jewett City, is one of the original examples of industrial development in Connecticut within the nineteenth century. Samuel Slater and his brother John bought the Jewett City cotton mill in 1823. These manufacturing systems relied heavily on the two main rivers within the region: the Pachaug and the Quinebaug. The running water from these rivers powered textile mills and factories all along that region of Connecticut.

These factories relied on running water to turn belt systems using turbines. The construction of these dams and turbines changed the river flow, which prevented fish from migrating up and down rivers, and also flooded the surrounding wetlands. As time went on, the rivers became increasingly more polluted. Millions of gallons of waste water were dumped into the waterways, which often combined with municipal sewage. During this time, the only source of freshwater was from nearby streams and rivers. This polluted the local drinking water and had a severe effect on the surrounding population.

Mills were often located next to low income, marginalized communities. This can be seen within the city of Danbury, as mills were located along the Still and Housatonic Rivers. Elemental mercury, copper, zinc, and lead was deposited as wastewater into these freshwater streams. Economic necessity drove citizens to these jobs despite the environmental and health risks. By 1887, there were 30 hat factories across the city. However, by 1923, only six were left within the city. The hat industry was the primary source of employment in places like Danbury, where the economy depended heavily on hat manufacturing; as factories closed due to changing fashions and economic downturns, this led to reduced employment opportunities and economic instability in the community. Similar issues also happened in Jewett City, as it was located next to the two largest Native American reservations within the state.

Connecticut's extensive industry, dense population, flat terrain, and wealth encouraged the construction of railroads starting in 1839. By 1840, 102 miles (164 km) of line were in operation, growing to 402 miles (647 km) in 1850 and 601 miles (967 km) in 1860.

The New York, New Haven and Hartford Railroad, called the New Haven or "The Consolidated", became the dominant Connecticut railroad company after 1872. J. P. Morgan began financing the major New England railroads in the 1890s, dividing territory so that they would not compete. The New Haven purchased 50 smaller companies, including steamship lines, and built a network of light rails (electrified trolleys) that provided inter-urban transportation for all of southern New England. By 1912, the New Haven operated over 2,000 miles (3,200 km) of track with 120,000 employees.

As steam-powered passenger ships proliferated after the Civil War, Noank produced the two largest built in Connecticut during the nineteenth century, with the 332-foot wooden steam paddle wheeler Rhode Island launched in 1882, and the 345-foot paddle wheeler Connecticut seven years later. Connecticut shipyards launched more than 165 steam-powered vessels in the nineteenth century.

In 1875, the first telephone exchange in the world was established in New Haven.

=== Twentieth century ===
==== World War I ====
When World War I broke out in 1914, Connecticut became a major supplier of weaponry to the U.S. military; by 1918, 80% of the state's industries were producing goods for the war effort. Remington Arms in Bridgeport produced half the small-arms cartridges used by the U.S. Army, with other major suppliers including Winchester in New Haven and Colt in Hartford.

Connecticut was also an important U.S. Navy supplier, with Electric Boat receiving orders for 85 submarines, Lake Torpedo Boat building more than 20 subs, and the Groton Iron Works building freighters. On June 21, 1916, the Navy made Groton the site for its East Coast submarine base and school.

The state enthusiastically supported the American war effort in 1917 and 1918 with large purchases of war bonds, a further expansion of industry, and an emphasis on increasing food production on the farms. Thousands of state, local, and volunteer groups mobilized for the war effort and were coordinated by the Connecticut State Council of Defense. Manufacturers wrestled with manpower shortages; Waterbury's American Brass and Manufacturing Company was running at half capacity, so the federal government agreed to furlough soldiers to work there.

==== Interwar period ====
In 1917, J. Henry Roraback consolidated several utilities into the Connecticut Light & Power Co. which became the state's dominant electric utility. In 1925, Frederick Rentschler spurred the creation of Pratt & Whitney in Hartford to develop engines for aircraft; the company became an important military supplier in World War II and one of the three major manufacturers of jet engines in the world.

On September 21, 1938, the most destructive storm in New England history struck eastern Connecticut, killing hundreds of people. The eye of the "Long Island Express" passed just west of New Haven and devastated the Connecticut shoreline between Old Saybrook and Stonington from the full force of wind and waves, even though they had partial protection by Long Island. The hurricane caused extensive damage to infrastructure, homes, and businesses. In New London, a 500-foot (150 m) sailing ship was driven into a warehouse complex, causing a major fire. Heavy rainfall caused the Connecticut River to flood downtown Hartford and East Hartford. An estimated 50,000 trees fell onto roadways.

==== World War II ====
The advent of lend-lease in support of Britain helped lift Connecticut from the Great Depression, with the state a major production center for weaponry and supplies used in World War II. Connecticut manufactured 4.1% of total U.S. military armaments produced during the war, ranking ninth among the 48 states, with major factories including Colt for firearms, Pratt & Whitney for aircraft engines, Chance Vought for fighter planes, Hamilton Standard for propellers, and Electric Boat for submarines and PT boats.

On May 13, 1940, Igor Sikorsky made an untethered flight of the first practical helicopter. The helicopter saw limited use in World War II, but future military production made Sikorsky Aircraft's Stratford plant Connecticut's largest single manufacturing site by the start of the twenty-first century.

Connecticut was known as the "Provisions State" or the "Arsenal of Democracy" during wartime for its production efforts during the Revolutionary, Civil, and World Wars. The state quickly transformed into a manufacturing powerhouse. With its strong history of aircraft and manufacturing, Connecticut was a large part of the World War II home front. Pratt & Whitney was a large Connecticut run manufacturing company, and by 1943, 96% of all U.S. Army and Navy transport planes used Pratt & Whitney engines. The state also produced ammunition, auto parts, and airplanes. While this allowed for the state to amass a large amount of revenue, it also caused severe environmental and economic issues once the war ended.

For example, the US Naval base in New London, CT allowed for many industrial level pollutants to enter Connecticut. Items like acid-filled ship batteries, oil, and petroleum were shipped to help fuel the war grade submarines. The EPA has ordered tests and studies that identified "polyaromatic hydrocarbons, or PAHs; polychlorinated biphenyls, or PCBs; lead, metals and pesticides" present within the bases surroundings. These pollutants are hard to break down, and cause cancer, development issues, damage to the nervous system, disruption of cognitive function. This disrupts not only the food chain and the biodiversity of the area, but the civilians local to the base are put in harm's way. This did not just happen due to the Naval presence in Connecticut, but was also due to the large scale manufacturing and agricultural upticks occurring within the state during World War II.

==== Post-World War II economic expansion ====
10,200 employees in Waterbury factories were let go within a week of V-J Day. Connecticut lost other wartime factories following the end of hostilities, but the state shared in a general post-war expansion that included the construction of highways and resulting in middle-class growth in suburban areas.

Prescott Bush represented Connecticut in the U.S. Senate from 1952 to 1963; his son George H. W. Bush and grandson George W. Bush both became presidents of the United States. In 1965, Connecticut ratified its current constitution, replacing the document that had served since 1818.

In 1968, commercial operation began for the Connecticut Yankee Nuclear Power Plant in Haddam; in 1970, the Millstone Nuclear Power Station began operations in Waterford. In 1974, Connecticut elected Democratic Governor Ella T. Grasso, who became the first woman in any state to be elected governor without being the wife or widow of a previous governor.

==== Late twentieth century ====
Connecticut's dependence on the defense industry posed an economic challenge at the end of the Cold War. The resulting budget crisis helped elect Lowell Weicker as governor on a third-party ticket in 1990. Weicker's remedy was a state income tax which proved effective in balancing the budget, but only for the short-term. He did not run for a second term, in part because of this politically unpopular move.

In 1992, initial construction was completed on Foxwoods Casino at the Mashantucket Pequots reservation in eastern Connecticut, which became the largest casino in the Western Hemisphere. Mohegan Sun followed four years later.

=== Early twenty-first century ===
In 2000, presidential candidate Al Gore chose Senator Joe Lieberman as his running mate, marking the first time that a major party presidential ticket included someone of the Jewish faith. George W. Bush and Dick Cheney won the Electoral College 271 to 266. In the terrorist attacks of September 11, 2001, 65 state residents were killed, mostly Fairfield County residents who were working in the World Trade Center. In 2004, Republican Governor John G. Rowland resigned during a corruption investigation, later pleading guilty to federal charges.

Connecticut was hit by three major storms in just over 14 months in 2011 and 2012, with all three causing extensive property damage and electric outages. Hurricane Irene struck Connecticut August 28, and damage totaled $235 million. Two months later, the "Halloween nor'easter" dropped extensive snow onto trees, resulting in snapped branches and trunks that damaged power lines; some areas were without electricity for 11 days. Hurricane Sandy hit New Jersey and passed over Connecticut with hurricane-force winds and tides up to 12 feet above normal. Many coastal buildings were damaged or destroyed. Sandy's winds drove storm surges into streets and cut power to 98% of homes and businesses, with more than $360 million in damage.

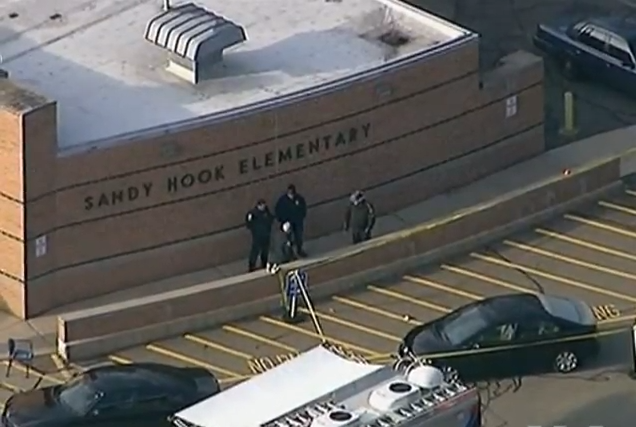
Police arrive at Sandy Hook Elementary, after the shooting

On December 14, 2012, a 20-year-old man named Adam Lanza shot and killed 26 people at Sandy Hook Elementary School in Newtown, and then killed himself. The massacre spurred renewed efforts by activists for tighter laws on gun ownership nationally.

In the summer and fall of 2016, Connecticut experienced a drought in many parts of the state, causing some water-use bans. As of November 15, 2016, 45% of the state was listed at Severe Drought by the U.S. Drought Monitor, including almost all of Hartford and Litchfield counties. All the rest of the state was in Moderate Drought or Severe Drought, including Middlesex, Fairfield, New London, New Haven, Windham, and Tolland counties. This affected the agricultural economy in the state.

== Geography ==
Connecticut is bordered on the south by Long Island Sound, on the west by New York, on the north by Massachusetts, and on the east by Rhode Island. The state's capital and fourth-largest city is Hartford, and other major cities and towns (by population) include Bridgeport, New Haven, Stamford, Waterbury, Norwalk, Danbury, New Britain, Greenwich, and Bristol. There are 169 incorporated towns in Connecticut, with cities and villages included within some towns.

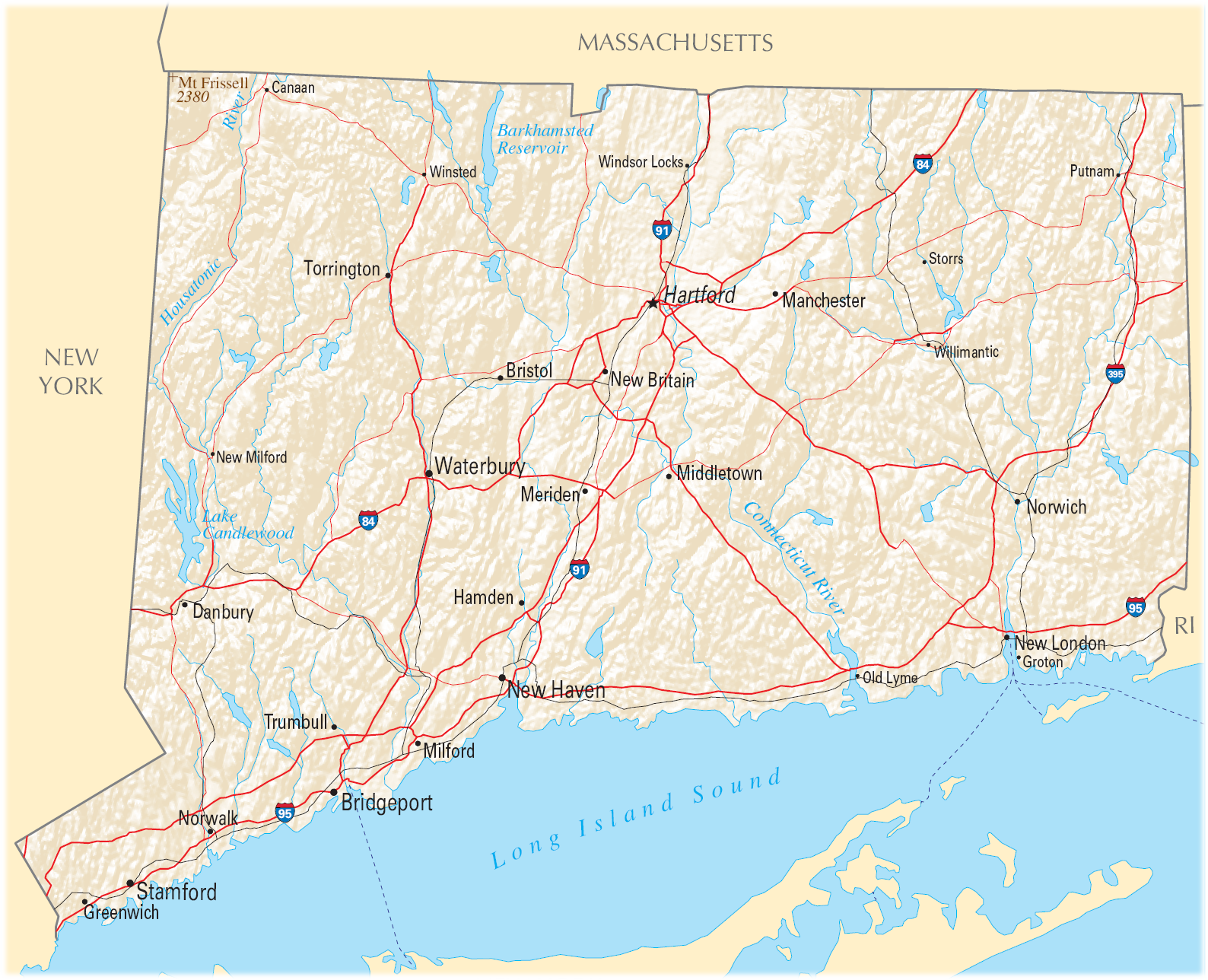
Reference Map showing major highways and settlements

The highest peak in Connecticut is Bear Mountain in Salisbury in the northwest corner of the state. The highest point is just east of where Connecticut, Massachusetts, and New York meet (42°3′ N, 73°29′ W), on the southern slope of Mount Frissell, whose peak lies nearby in Massachusetts. At the opposite extreme, many of the coastal towns have areas that are less than 20 feet (6.1 m) above sea level.

Connecticut has a long maritime history and a reputation based on that history—yet the state has no direct oceanfront (technically speaking). The coast of Connecticut sits on Long Island Sound, which is an estuary. The state's access to the open Atlantic Ocean is both to the west (toward New York City) and to the east (toward the "race" near Rhode Island). Due to this unique geography, Long Island Sound and the Connecticut shoreline are relatively protected from high waves from storms.

The Connecticut River cuts through the center of the state, flowing into Long Island Sound. The most populous metropolitan region centered within the state lies in the Connecticut River Valley. Despite Connecticut's relatively small size, it features wide regional variations in its landscape; for example, in the northwestern Litchfield Hills, it features rolling mountains and horse farms, whereas in areas to the east of New Haven along the coast, the landscape features coastal marshes, beaches, and large scale maritime activities.

Connecticut's rural areas and small towns in the northeast and northwest corners of the state contrast sharply with its industrial cities such as Stamford, Bridgeport, and New Haven, located along the coastal highways from the New York border to New London, then northward up the Connecticut River to Hartford. Many towns in northeastern and northwestern Connecticut center around a green. Near the green typically stand historical visual symbols of New England towns, such as a white church, a colonial meeting house, a colonial tavern or inn, several colonial houses, and so on, establishing a scenic historical appearance maintained for both historic preservation and tourism. Many of the areas in southern and coastal Connecticut have been built up and rebuilt over the years, and look less visually like traditional New England.

The northern boundary of the state with Massachusetts is marked by the Southwick Jog or Granby Notch, an approximately 2.5-mile (4.0 km) square detour into Connecticut. The origin of this anomaly is clearly established in a long line of disputes and temporary agreements which were finally concluded in 1804, when southern Southwick's residents sought to leave Massachusetts, and the town was split in half.

The southwestern border of Connecticut where it abuts New York State is marked by a panhandle in Fairfield County and the Western Connecticut Planning Region, containing the towns of Greenwich, Stamford, New Canaan, Darien, and parts of Norwalk and Wilton. This irregularity in the boundary is the result of territorial disputes in the late 17th century, culminating with New York giving up its claim to the area, whose residents considered themselves part of Connecticut, in exchange for an equivalent area extending northwards from Ridgefield to the Massachusetts border, as well as undisputed claim to Rye, New York.

Areas maintained by the National Park Service include Appalachian National Scenic Trail, Quinebaug and Shetucket Rivers Valley National Heritage Corridor, and Weir Farm National Historic Site.

=== Climate ===
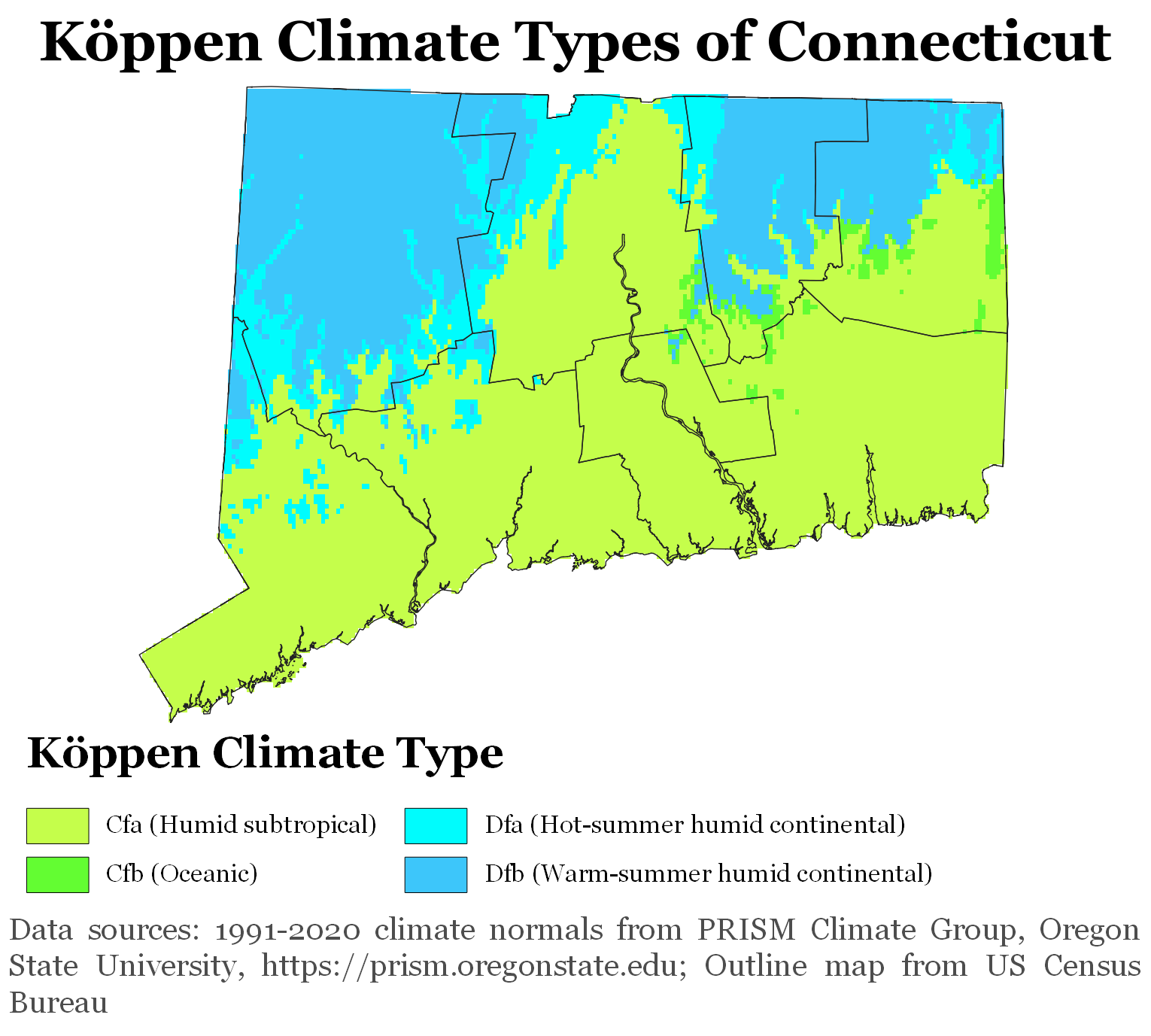
Köppen climate types of Connecticut, using 1991–2020 climate normals.

Connecticut lies at the rough transition zone between the southern end of the humid continental climate and the northern portion of the humid subtropical climate. Northern Connecticut generally experiences a climate with hot, humid summers and moderately cold winters with periodic snowfall. Far southern and coastal Connecticut has a climate with cool winters with a mix of rain and infrequent snow, and the long hot and humid summers typical of the middle and lower East Coast. Coastal Connecticut is the very broad transition zone between the humid continental climate and the humid subtropical climate.

==== Precipitation ====
Connecticut sees a fairly even precipitation pattern spread throughout the 12 months. Connecticut averages 56% of possible sunshine (higher than the U.S. national average), averaging 2,400 hours of sunshine annually. Occasionally, some months may see extremes in precipitation, either much higher or lower than normal, though long term droughts and floods are rare.

Early spring can range from slightly cool (40s to low 50s °F / 4.4 to 10 °C) to warm (18 to 21 °C or 65 to 70 °F), while mid and late spring (late April/May) is warm. By late May, the building Bermuda High creates a southerly flow of warm and humid tropical air, bringing hot weather conditions throughout the state. Average highs are 81 °F (27 °C) in New London and 85 °F (29 °C) in Windsor Locks at the peak of summer in late July. On occasion, heat waves with highs from 90 to 100 °F (32 to 38 °C) occur across Connecticut. Connecticut's record high temperature is 106 °F (41 °C) which occurred in Danbury on July 15, 1995. Although summers are sunny in Connecticut, quick moving summer thunderstorms can bring brief downpours with thunder and lightning. Occasionally these thunderstorms can be severe, and the state usually averages one tornado per year. During hurricane season, the remains of tropical cyclones occasionally affect the region, though a direct hit is rare. Some notable hurricanes to impact the state include the 1938 New England hurricane, Hurricane Carol in 1954, Hurricane Sandy in 2012, and Hurricane Isaias in 2020.

Weather commonly associated with the fall season typically begins in October and lasts to the first days of December. Daily high temperatures in October and November range from the 50s to 60s °F or 10 to 15.6 °C. Winters (December through mid-March) are moderately generally cold from south to north in Connecticut. The coldest month (January) has average high temperatures ranging from 38 °F (3 °C) in the coastal lowlands to 33 °F (1 °C) in the inland and northern portions on the state.

The lowest temperature recorded in Connecticut is −32 °F (−36 °C) which has been observed twice: in Falls Village on February 16, 1943, and in Coventry on January 22, 1961. The average yearly snowfall ranges from about 60 inches (1,500 mm) in the higher elevations of the northern portion of the state to only 20–25 inches (510–640 mm) along the southeast coast of Connecticut (Branford to Groton). Most of Connecticut has less than 60 days of snow cover, while coastal areas often only see 30 days or so of snowcover. Annually, 95% of seasonal snowfall in Connecticut falls from early December to late March. On occasion in winter, Connecticut can occasionally get heavy snowstorms, called nor'easters, which may produce as much as two feet of snow on rare occasions. Although rare, ice storms also occur on occasion, such as the Southern New England ice storm of 1973.

Monthly normal high and low temperatures for various Connecticut cities (°F)
City	Jan	Feb	Mar	Apr	May	Jun	Jul	Aug	Sep	Oct	Nov	Dec
Bridgeport	38/24	40/25	47/32	58/41	68/51	77/61	83/67	81/67	75/59	64/48	53/38	43/30
Hartford	35/18	38/20	47/28	60/38	71/48	79/57	85/63	83/61	75/53	63/42	51/33	40/24

=== Flora ===
Forests consist of a mix of Northeastern coastal forests of oak in southern areas of the state, to the upland New England-Acadian forests in the northwestern parts of the state. Mountain Laurel (Kalmia latifolia) is the state flower and is native to low ridges in several parts of Connecticut. Rosebay rhododendron (Rhododendron maximum) is also native to eastern uplands of Connecticut and Pachaug State Forest is home to the Rhododendron Sanctuary Trail. Atlantic white cedar (Chamaecyparis thyoides), is found in wetlands in the southern parts of the state. Connecticut has one native cactus (Opuntia humifusa), found in sandy coastal areas and low hillsides. Several types of beach grasses and wildflowers are also native to Connecticut. Connecticut spans USDA Plant Hardiness Zones 5b to 7a. Coastal Connecticut is the broad transition zone where more southern and subtropical plants are cultivated.

=== Largest cities and towns ===
Largest cities or towns in Connecticut
Rank	Name	Region	Pop.	Rank	Name	Region	Pop.
1	Bridgeport	Greater Bridgeport	148,654	11	Fairfield	Greater Bridgeport	61,512
2	Stamford	Western	135,470	12	Hamden	South Central	61,169
3	New Haven	South Central	134,023	13	Meriden	South Central	60,850
4	Hartford	Capitol	121,054	14	Bristol	Naugatuck Valley	60,833
5	Waterbury	Naugatuck Valley	114,403	15	Manchester	Capitol	59,713
6	Norwalk	Western	91,184	16	West Haven	South Central	55,584
7	Danbury	Western	86,518	17	Stratford	Greater Bridgeport	52,355
8	New Britain	Capitol	74,135	18	Milford	South Central	52,044
9	West Hartford	Capitol	64,083	19	East Hartford	Capitol	51,045
10	Greenwich	Western	63,518	20	Middletown	Lower Connecticut River Valley	47,717

== Demographics ==
Historical population
Census	Pop.	Note	%±
1790	237,946		—
1800	251,002		5.5%
1810	261,942		4.4%
1820	275,248		5.1%
1830	297,675		8.1%
1840	309,978		4.1%
1850	370,792		19.6%
1860	460,147		24.1%
1870	537,454		16.8%
1880	622,700		15.9%
1890	746,258		19.8%
1900	908,420		21.7%
1910	1,114,756		22.7%
1920	1,380,631		23.9%
1930	1,606,903		16.4%
1940	1,709,242		6.4%
1950	2,007,280		17.4%
1960	2,535,234		26.3%
1970	3,031,709		19.6%
1980	3,107,576		2.5%
1990	3,287,116		5.8%
2000	3,405,565		3.6%
2010	3,574,097		4.9%
2020	3,605,944		0.9%
2025 (est.)	3,688,496		2.3%

As of the 2020 United States census, Connecticut has a population of 3,605,944, an increase of 31,847 people (0.9%) from the 2010 United States census. Among the census records, 20.4% of the population was under 18.

In 1790, 97% of the population in Connecticut was classified as "rural". The first census in which less than half the population was classified as rural was 1890. In the 2000 census, only 12.3% was considered rural. Most of western and southern Connecticut (particularly the Gold Coast) is strongly associated with New York City; this area is the most affluent and populous region of the state and has high property costs and high incomes. The center of population of Connecticut is located in the town of Cheshire.

According to HUD's 2022 Annual Homeless Assessment Report, there were an estimated 2,930 homeless people in Connecticut.

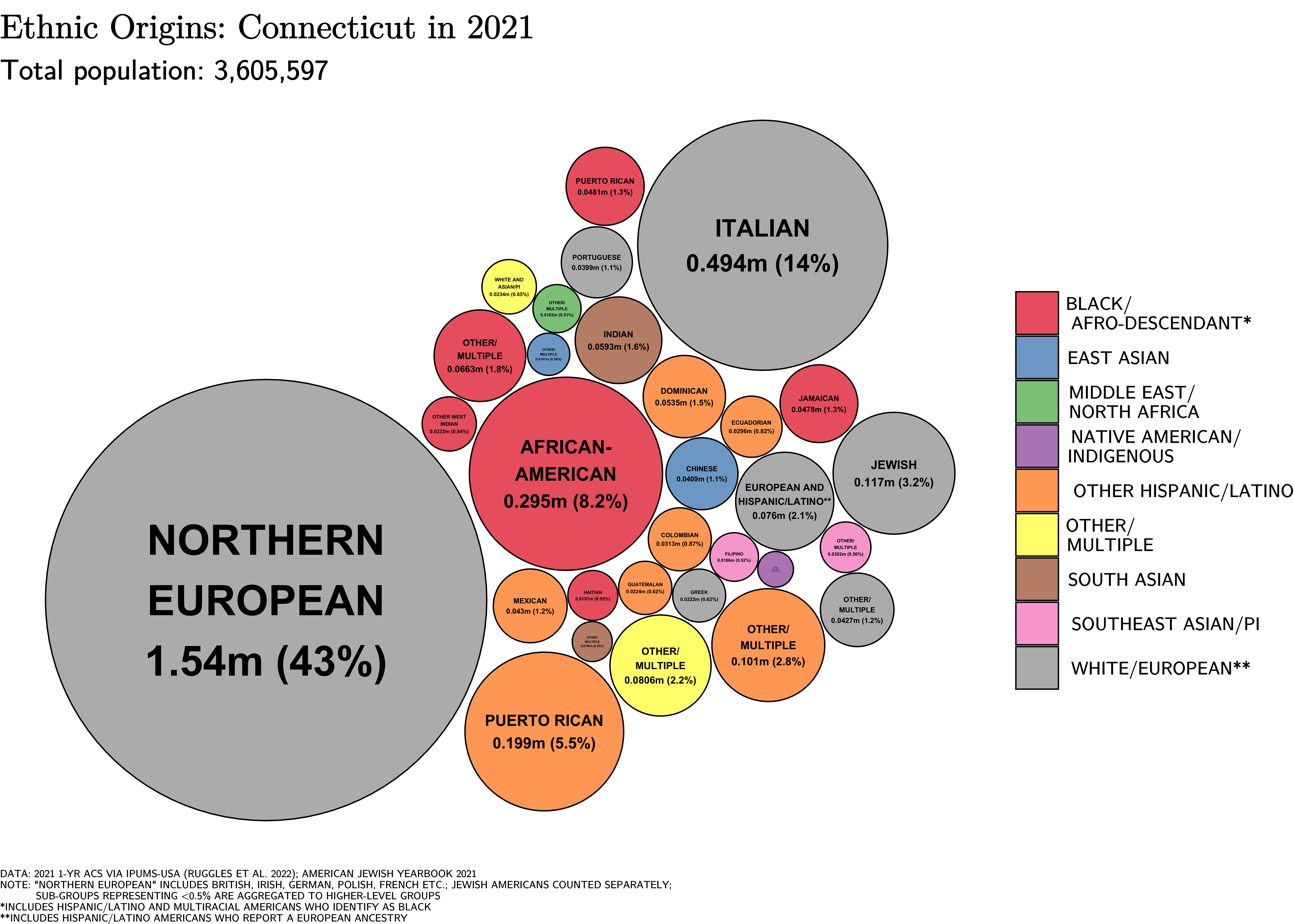
Ethnic origins in Connecticut

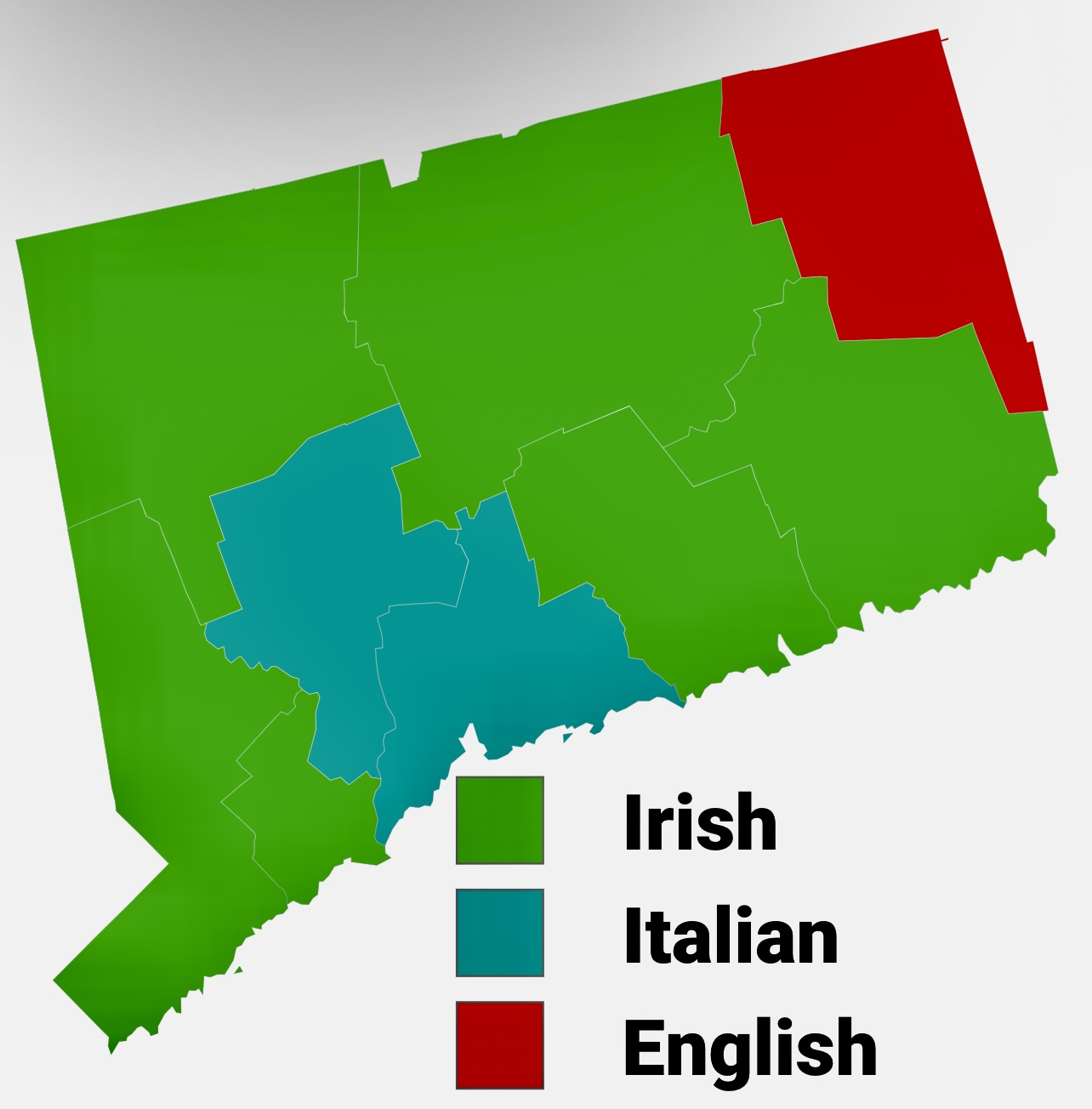
Largest alone or in any combination ethnic origin by county in Connecticut, per the 2020 census

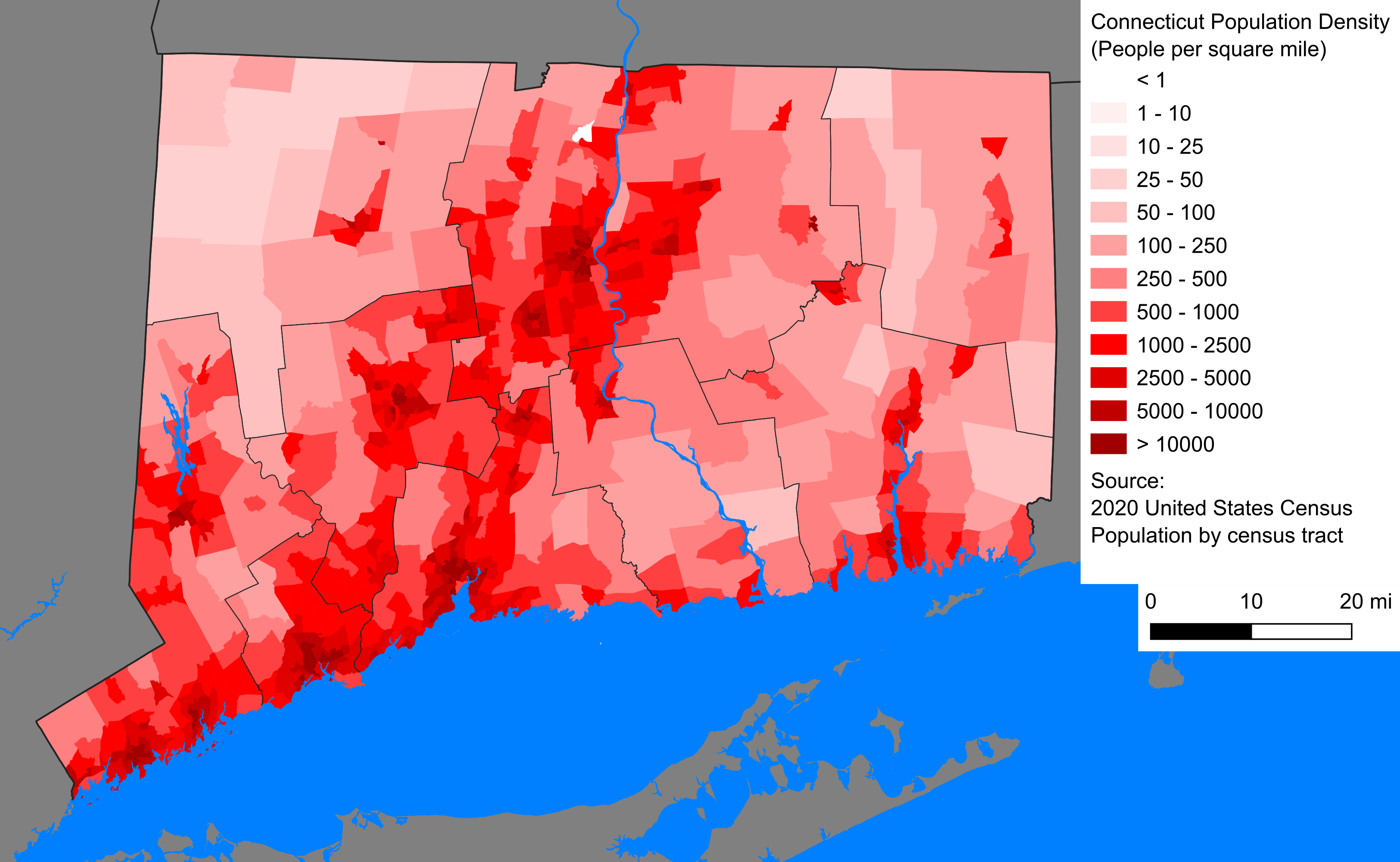
Population density map of Connecticut as of 2020

=== Racial and ethnic composition ===
Racial and ethnic composition as of the 2020 census
Race and ethnicity	Alone	Total
White (non-Hispanic)	63.2%	66.6%
Hispanic or Latino (Note: Persons of Hispanic or Latino origin are not distinguished between total and partial ancestry.)	—	17.3%
African American (non-Hispanic)	10.0%	11.4%
Asian	4.7%	5.5%
Native American	0.2%	1.1%
Pacific Islander	0.03%	0.1%
Other	0.8%	2.1%

Connecticut – Racial and ethnic composition Note: the US Census treats Hispanic/Latino as an ethnic category. This table excludes Latinos from the racial categories and assigns them to a separate category. Hispanics/Latinos may be of any race.
Race / Ethnicity (NH = Non-Hispanic)	Pop 1980	Pop 1990	Pop 2000	Pop 2010	Pop 2020	% 1980	% 1990	% 2000	% 2010	% 2020
White alone (NH)	2,735,418	2,754,184	2,638,845	2,546,262	2,279,232	88.02%	83.79%	77.49%	71.24%	63.21%
Black or African American alone (NH)	212,984	260,840	295,571	335,119	360,937	6.85%	7.94%	8.68%	9.38%	10.01%
Native American or Alaska Native alone (NH)	4,533	5,950	7,267	6,885	6,404	0.15%	0.18%	0.21%	0.19%	0.18%
Asian alone (NH)	18,970	49,114	81,564	134,091	170,459	0.61%	1.49%	2.40%	3.75%	4.73%
Native Hawaiian or Pacific Islander alone (NH)	x	x	958	958	974	x	x	0.03%	0.03%	0.03%
Other race alone (NH)	11,172	3,912	8,141	12,190	27,076	0.36%	0.12%	0.24%	0.34%	0.75%
Mixed race or Multiracial (NH)	x	x	52,896	59,505	137,569	x	x	1.55%	1.66%	3.82%
Hispanic or Latino (any race)	124,499	213,116	320,323	479,087	623,293	4.01%	6.48%	9.41%	13.40%	17.29%
Total	3,107,576	3,287,116	3,405,565	3,574,097	3,605,944	100.00%	100.00%	100.00%	100.00%	100.00%

In common with the majority of the United States, non-Hispanic whites have remained the dominant racial and ethnic group in Connecticut. From being 98% of the population in 1940, however, they have declined to 63% of the population as of the 2020 census. These statistics have represented fewer Americans identifying as non-Hispanic white, which has given rise to the Hispanic and Latino American population and Asian American population overall. As of 2011, 46.1% of Connecticut's population younger than age 1 were minorities. As of 2004, 11.4% of the population (400,000) was foreign-born. In 1870, native-born Americans had accounted for 75% of the state's population, but that had dropped to 35% by 1918. Also as of 2000, 81.69% of Connecticut residents age 5 and older spoke English at home and 8.42% spoke Spanish, followed by Italian at 1.59%, French at 1.31%, and Polish at 1.20%.

The largest ancestry groups in 2010 were: 19.3% Italian, 17.9% Irish, 10.7% English, 10.4% German, 8.6% Polish, 6.6% French, 3.0% French Canadian, 2.7% American, 2.0% Scottish, and 1.4% Scotch Irish.

Hispanics in Connecticut make up 19.2% of the population, predominantly of Puerto Rican (8.2%) origin, followed by Mexican (1.7%) and Dominican (1.5%). The state has the highest share of Puerto Ricans in the country and the sixth largest Puerto Rican population (301,931) in the country.

Connecticut is one of the most racially segregated states in the nation, with the nonwhite population largely concentrated in major urban areas such as Bridgeport, Hartford, New Haven and Waterbury. In many cases, towns neighboring urban areas are sharply segregated from them.

The top countries of origin for Connecticut's immigrants in 2018 were India, Jamaica, the Dominican Republic, Poland and Ecuador.

=== Birth data ===
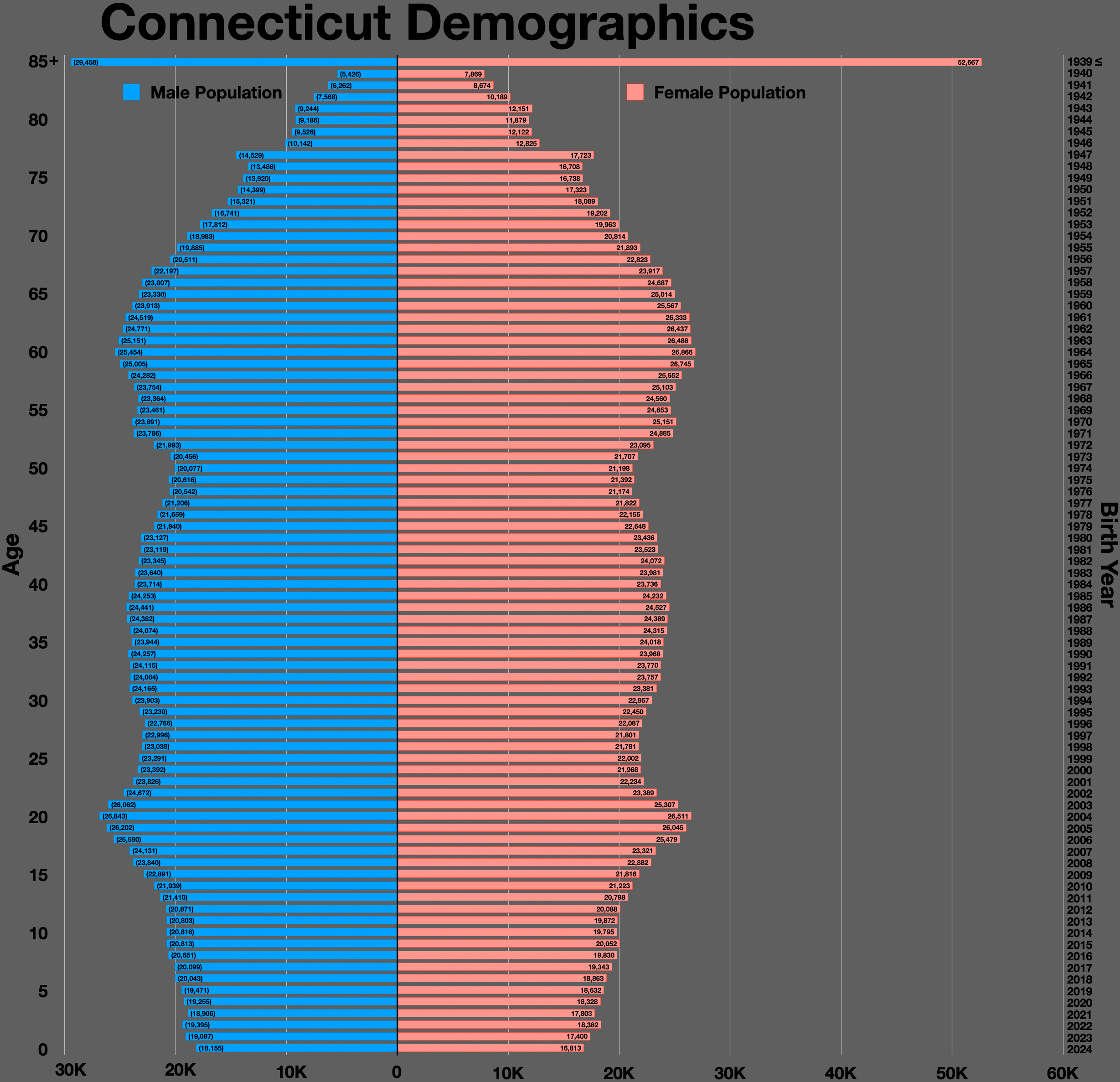
Connecticut population pyramid

Note: Births in table do not add up because Hispanics are counted both by their ethnicity and by their race, giving a higher overall number.

Live Births by Single Race/Ethnicity of Mother
Race	2014	2015	2016	2017	2018	2019	2020	2021	2022	2023	2024
White	20,933 (57.7%)	20,395 (57.0%)	19,551 (54.3%)	18,842 (53.5%)	18,488 (53.2%)	18,366 (53.6%)	17,785 (53.2%)	19,136 (53.6%)	18,681 (52.9%)	17,969 (52.0%)	17,857 (51.6%)
Black	5,154 (14.2%)	4,988 (14.0%)	4,453 (12.4%)	4,301 (12.2%)	4,423 (12.7%)	4,221 (12.3%)	4,056 (12.1%)	4,357 (12.2%)	4,298 (12.2%)	4,053 (11.7%)	3,944 (11.4%)
Asian	2,280 (6.3%)	2,497 (7.0%)	2,583 (7.2%)	2,475 (7.0%)	2,232 (6.4%)	2,199 (6.4%)	1,992 (6.0%)	1,921 (5.4%)	1,878 (5.3%)	1,850 (5.3%)	1,909 (5.5%)
Hispanic (any race)	8,129 (22.4%)	8,275 (23.1%)	8,622 (23.9%)	8,833 (25.1%)	8,762 (25.2%)	8,728 (25.5%)	8,861 (26.5%)	9,482 (26.6%)	9,597 (27.2%)	9,803 (28.3%)	10,062 (29.1%)
Total	36,285 (100%)	35,746 (100%)	36,015 (100%)	35,221 (100%)	34,725 (100%)	34,258 (100%)	33,460 (100%)	35,670 (100%)	35,332 (100%)	34,559 (100%)	34,599 (100%)

Religion in Connecticut (2014)
Religion	Percent
Protestant	35%
Catholic	33%
None	28%
Jewish	3%
Mormon	1%
Eastern Orthodox	1%
Other Christian	1%
Buddhist	1%
Hindu	1%
Islam	1%
Other	2%
Do not know	1%

- Since 2016, data for births of White Hispanic origin are not collected, but included in one Hispanic group; persons of Hispanic origin may be of any race.

=== Religion ===
A 2014 Pew survey of Connecticut residents' religious self-identification showed the following distribution of affiliations Protestant 35%, Roman Catholic 33%, non-religious 28%, Jewish 3%, Mormonism 1%, Orthodox 1%, Jehovah's Witness 1%, Hinduism 1%, Buddhism 1% and Islam 1%. Jewish congregations had 108,280 (3.2%) members in 2000.

The Jewish population is concentrated in the towns near Long Island Sound between Greenwich and New Haven, in Greater New Haven and in Greater Hartford, especially the suburb of West Hartford. According to the Association of Religion Data Archives, the largest Christian denominations, by number of adherents, in 2010 were: the Catholic Church, with 1,252,936; the United Church of Christ, with 96,506; and non-denominational Evangelical Protestants, with 72,863.

Recent immigration has brought other non-Christian religions to the state, but the numbers of adherents of other religions are still low. Connecticut is also home to New England's largest Protestant church: The First Cathedral in Bloomfield, Connecticut. Hartford is seat to the Roman Catholic Archdiocese of Hartford, which is sovereign over the Diocese of Bridgeport and the Diocese of Norwich.

By a 2020 Public Religion Research Institute survey, 71% of the population identified as some form of Christian. It found the state to be 21% non-religious and specifically 19% white mainline Protestant, 19% white Catholic, 9% white evangelical Protestant, 7% black Protestant, and 7% Hispanic Catholic. In contrast to the 2014 Pew survey, (Note: Which found Protestants to be only 2% more numerous than Catholics in Connecticut) the 2020 PRRI survey found Connecticut to be 40% Protestant and 28% Catholic (with the remainder of Christians being Mormon at 2%, and Orthodox at 1%). The PRRI survey found Jewish citizens to be 2% of the population and, like the Pew survey: Hindus, Buddhists, and Muslims to be 1% each.

=== Vital statistics ===
Year	Population	Live births	Deaths	Natural change	Crude birth rate (per 1,000)	Crude death rate (per 1,000)	Natural change (per 1,000)	Crude migration change (per 1,000)
2000	3,411,777	43,026	30,129	12,897	12.6	8.8	3.8	
2001	3,432,835	42,648	29,827	12,821	12.4	8.7	3.7	2.4
2002	3,458,749	42,001	30,122	11,879	12.1	8.7	3.4	4.1
2003	3,484,336	42,873	29,627	13,246	12.3	8.5	3.8	3.5
2004	3,496,094	42,095	29,314	12,781	12.0	8.4	3.6	-0.3
2005	3,506,956	41,718	29,467	12,251	11.9	8.4	3.5	-0.4
2006	3,517,460	41,820	29,260	12,560	11.9	8.3	3.6	-0.6
2007	3,527,270	41,660	28,651	13,009	11.8	8.1	3.7	-0.9
2008	3,545,579	40,399	28,794	11,605	11.4	8.1	3.3	1.9
2009	3,561,807	38,896	28,585	10,311	10.9	8.0	2.9	1.7
2010	3,580,281	37,708	28,692	9,016	10.5	8.0	2.5	2.6
2011	3,594,181	37,281	29,526	7,755	10.4	8.2	2.2	1.7
2012	3,605,215	36,539	29,316	7,223	10.1	8.1	2.0	1.1
2013	3,610,238	36,085	29,632	6,453	10.0	8.2	1.8	-0.4
2014	3,614,584	36,285	29,860	6,425	10.0	8.3	1.7	-0.6
2015	3,611,891	35,746	30,535	5,211	9.9	8.5	1.4	-2.2
2016	3,607,614	36,015	30,543	5,472	10.0	8.5	1.5	-2.7
2017	3,607,550	35,221	31,312	3,909	9.8	8.7	1.1	-1.1
2018	3,611,229	34,725	31,230	3,495	9.6	8.6	1.0	0.1
2019	3,607,133	34,258	31,745	2,513	9.5	8.8	0.7	-1.8
2020	3,579,643	33,460	37,853	-4,393	9.3	10.6	-1.3	-6.5
2021	3,607,765	35,670	34,333	1,337	9.9	9.5	0.4	7.4
2022	3,618,707	35,332	34,583	749	9.8	9.6	0.2	2.8
2023	3,641,369	34,559	32,522	2,037	9.5	8.9	0.6	5.7
2024	3,674,449	34,599	32,481	2,118	9.4	8.8	0.6	8.4
2025	3,688,496	34,676	32,535	2,141	9.4	8.8	0.6	3.2

== Economy ==
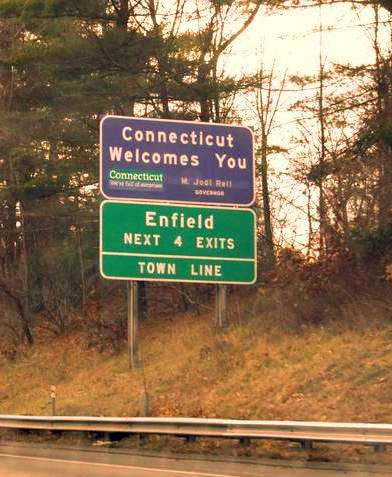
A welcome sign on I-91 in Enfield.

In 2025, the gross state product for Connecticut was $376.4 billion.

Connecticut's per capita personal income in 2025 was $98,879. There is a large disparity in incomes throughout the state; Connecticut was tied with California and Massachusetts for the second highest (after New York's 0.52) Gini coefficient, at 0.50, as of 2020. As of 2025, it remained tied for second with Louisiana, with only New York having higher levels of inequality. Despite its overall inequality, Connecticut has a relatively low poverty rate. According to a 2018 study by Phoenix Marketing International, Connecticut had the third-largest number of millionaires per capita in the United States, with a ratio of 7.75%. New Canaan is the wealthiest town in Connecticut, with a per capita income of $105,846. Hartford is the poorest municipality in Connecticut, with a per capita income of $16,798 in 2020. At the county level, per capita income ranged from $48,295 in Fairfield County to $26,585 in Windham County, which is close to the United States average.

As of May 2025, Connecticut's unemployment rate was 3.8%, with U.S. unemployment at 4.2% that month. Dating back to 1982, Connecticut recorded its lowest unemployment in 2000 between August and October, at 2.2%. The highest unemployment rate during that period occurred in November and December 2010 at 9.3%, but economists expected record new levels of layoffs as a result of business closures in the spring of 2020 due to the coronavirus pandemic.

=== Taxation ===
Tax is collected by the Connecticut Department of Revenue Services and by local municipalities.

As of 2012, Connecticut residents had the second highest rate in the nation of combined state and local taxes after New York, at 12.6% of income compared to the national average of 9.9% as reported by the Tax Foundation.

Before 1991, Connecticut had an investment-only income tax system. Income from employment was untaxed, but income from investments was taxed at 13%, the highest rate in the U.S., with no deductions allowed for costs of producing the investment income, such as interest on borrowing.

In 1991, under Governor Lowell P. Weicker Jr., an independent, the system was changed to one in which the taxes on employment income and investment income were equalized at a maximum rate of 4%. The new tax policy drew investment firms to Connecticut; as of 2019, Fairfield County was home to the headquarters for 16 of the 200 largest hedge funds in the world.

As of 2019, the income tax rates on Connecticut individuals were divided into seven tax brackets of 3% (on income up to $10,000); 5% ($10,000–$50,000); 5.5% ($50,000–$100,000); 6% ($100,000–$200,000); 6.5% ($200,000–$250,000); 6.9% ($250,000–$500,000); and 6.99% above $500,000, with additional amounts owed depending on the bracket.

All wages of Connecticut residents are subject to the state's income tax, even if earned outside the state. However, in those cases, Connecticut income tax must be withheld only to the extent the Connecticut tax exceeds the amount withheld by the other jurisdiction. Since New York has higher income tax rates than Connecticut, this effectively means that Connecticut residents who work in New York have no Connecticut income tax withheld. Connecticut permits a credit for taxes paid to other jurisdictions, but since residents who work in other states are still subject to Connecticut income taxation, they may owe taxes if the jurisdictional credit does not fully offset the Connecticut tax amount.

Connecticut levies a 6.35% state sales tax on the retail sale, lease, or rental of most goods. Some items and services in general are not subject to sales and use taxes unless specifically enumerated as taxable by statute. A provision excluding clothing under $50 from sales tax was repealed as of July 1, 2011. There are no additional sales taxes imposed by local jurisdictions. In 2001, Connecticut instituted what became an annual sales tax "holiday" each August lasting one week, when retailers do not have to remit sales tax on certain items and quantities of clothing that has varied from year to year.

State law authorizes municipalities to tax property, including real estate, vehicles and other personal property, with state statute providing varying exemptions, credits and abatements. All assessments are at 70% of fair market value. The maximum property tax credit is $200 per return and any excess may not be refunded or carried forward. According to the Tax Foundation, on a per capita basis in the 2017 fiscal year Connecticut residents paid the 3rd highest average property taxes in the nation after New Hampshire and New Jersey.

As of January 1, 2020, gasoline taxes and fees in Connecticut were 40.13 cents per gallon, 11th highest in the United States which had a nationwide average of 36.13 cents a gallon excluding federal taxes. Diesel taxes and fees as of January 2020 in Connecticut were 46.50 cents per gallon, ninth highest nationally with the U.S. average at 37.91 cents.

=== Real estate ===
In 2019, sales of single-family homes in Connecticut totaled 33,146 units, a 2.1 percent decline from the 2018 transaction total. The median home sold in 2019 recorded a transaction amount of $260,000, up 0.4 percent from 2018.

Connecticut had the seventh highest rate of home foreclosure activity in the country in 2019 at 0.53 percent of the total housing stock.

=== Industries ===
Finance, insurance and real estate was Connecticut's largest industry in 2018 as ranked by gross domestic product, generating $75.7 billion in GDP that year.

Major employers include: The Hartford, Travelers, Harman International, Cigna, the Aetna subsidiary of CVS Health, Mass Mutual, People's United Bank, Bank of America, Bridgewater Associates, GE Capital, William Raveis Real Estate, and Berkshire Hathaway through reinsurance and residential real estate subsidiaries.

The combined educational, health and social services sector was the largest single industry as ranked by employment, with a combined workforce of 342,600 people at the end of 2019, ranking fourth the year before in GDP at $28.3 billion.

The broad business and professional services sector had the second highest GDP total in Connecticut in 2018 at an estimated $33.7 billion.

Manufacturing was the third biggest industry in 2018 with GDP of $30.8 billion, dominated by Raytheon Technologies formed in the March 2020 merger of Hartford-based United Technologies and Waltham, Mass.-based Raytheon Co. As of the merger, Raytheon Technologies employed about 19,000 people in Connecticut through subsidiaries Pratt & Whitney and Collins Aerospace. Lockheed Martin subsidiary Sikorsky Aircraft operates Connecticut's single largest manufacturing plant in Stratford, where it makes helicopters.

Major audio equipment manufacturing company Harman International, a subsidiary of Samsung Electronics and owner of JBL, AKG and Harman Kardon, is headquartered in Stamford, Connecticut.

Other major manufacturers include the Electric Boat division of General Dynamics, which makes submarines in Groton.

Connecticut historically was a center of gun manufacturing, and four gun-manufacturing firms continued to operate in the state as of December 2012, employing 2,000 people: Colt, Stag, Ruger, and Mossberg. Marlin, owned by Remington, closed in April 2011.

Other large components of the Connecticut economy in 2018 included wholesale trade ($18.1 billion in GDP); information services ($13.8 billion); retail ($13.7 billion); arts, entertainment and food services ($9.1 billion); and construction ($8.3 billion).

Tourists spent $9.3 billion in Connecticut in 2017 according to estimates as part of a series of studies commissioned by the state of Connecticut. Foxwoods Resort Casino and Mohegan Sun are the two biggest tourist draws and number among the state's largest employers; both are located on Native American reservations in the southeastern Connecticut.

Connecticut's agricultural production totaled $580 million in 2017, with just over half of that revenue the result of nursery stock production. Milk production totaled $81 million that year, with other major product categories including eggs, vegetables and fruit, tobacco and shellfish.

=== Energy ===
Connecticut's economy uses less energy to produce each dollar of GDP than all other states except California, Massachusetts, and New York. It uses less energy on a per-capita basis than all but six other states. It has no fossil-fuel resources, but does have renewable resources. Average retail electricity prices are the highest among the 48 contiguous states. While most of the state's energy consumption is generated using fossil fuels, nuclear power delivered over 40% of state's electricity generation in 2019. Refuse-derived fuels and other biomass provided the largest share of renewable electricity at about a 3% share. Solar and wind generation have grown in recent years. More than three-quarters of solar generation came from distributed small-scale installations such as rooftop solar in 2019, and there is planning underway to significantly increase renewable generation with the state's offshore wind resource.

== Transport ==
=== Roads ===
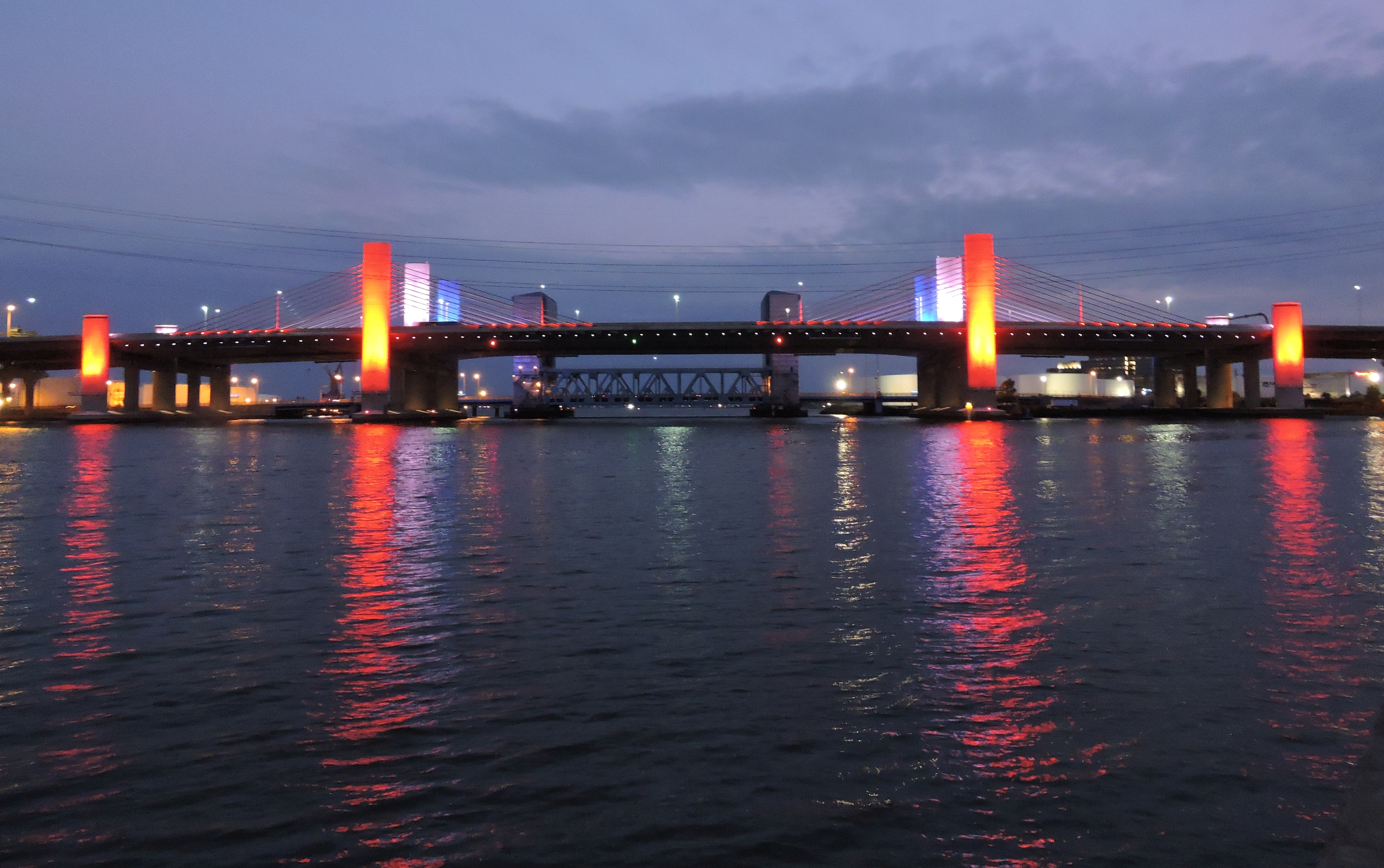
The Pearl Harbor Memorial Bridge, locally known as the Q Bridge, carries ten lanes over the Quinnipiac River in New Haven, along the Connecticut Turnpike.

The Interstate highways in the state are Interstate 95 (I-95) traveling southwest to northeast along the coast, I-84 traveling southwest to northeast in the center of the state, I-91 traveling north to south in the center of the state, and I-395 traveling north to south near the eastern border of the state. The other major highways in Connecticut are the Merritt Parkway and Wilbur Cross Parkway, which together form Connecticut Route 15 (Route 15), traveling from the Hutchinson River Parkway in New York parallel to I-95 before turning north of New Haven and traveling parallel to I-91, finally becoming a surface road in Berlin. I-95 and Route 15 were originally toll roads; they relied on a system of toll plazas at which all traffic stopped and paid fixed tolls. A series of major crashes at these plazas eventually contributed to the decision to remove the tolls in 1988. Other major arteries in the state include U.S. Route 7 (US 7) in the west traveling parallel to the New York state line, Route 8 farther east near the industrial city of Waterbury and traveling north–south along the Naugatuck River Valley nearly parallel with US 7, and Route 9 in the east.

Between New Haven and New York City, I-95 is one of the most congested highways in the United States. Although I-95 has been widened in several spots, some areas are only three lanes and this strains traffic capacity, resulting in frequent and lengthy rush hour delays. Frequently, the congestion spills over to clog the parallel Merritt Parkway and even US 1. The state has encouraged traffic reduction schemes, including rail use and ride-sharing.

Connecticut also has a very active bicycling community, with one of the highest rates of bicycle ownership and use in the United States, particularly in New Haven. According to the U.S. Census 2006 American Community Survey, New Haven has the highest percentage of commuters who bicycle to work of any major metropolitan center on the East Coast.

=== Rail ===
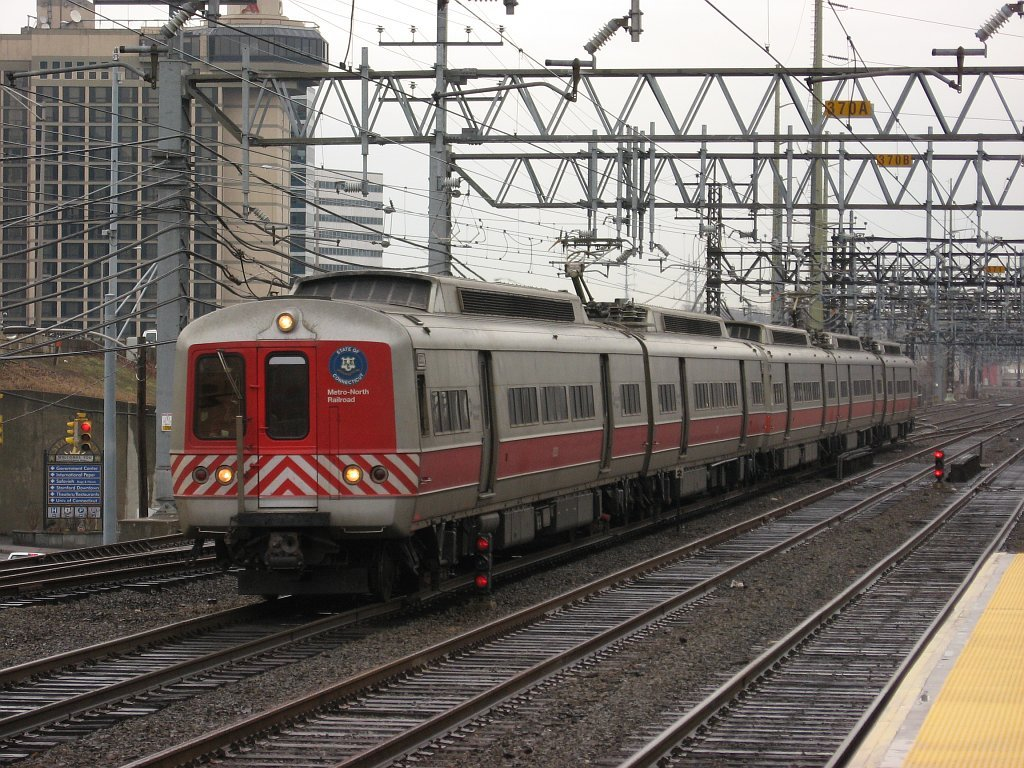
A Metro-North Railroad New Haven Line train leaving Stamford Station

Rail is a popular travel mode between New Haven and New York City's Grand Central Terminal. Southwestern Connecticut is served by the Metro-North Railroad's New Haven Line, operated by the Metropolitan Transportation Authority. Metro-North provides commuter service between New York City and New Haven, with branches to New Canaan, Danbury, and Waterbury. Connecticut lies along Amtrak's Northeast Corridor, which features frequent Northeast Regional and Acela Express service from New Haven south to New York City, Philadelphia, Baltimore, Washington, D.C., and Norfolk, VA, as well as north to New London, Providence and Boston. Since 1990, coastal cities and towns between New Haven and New London are also served by the Shore Line East commuter line.

In June 2018, a commuter rail service called the Hartford Line began operating between New Haven and Springfield on Amtrak's New Haven-Springfield Line. Hartford Line service is provided by both Amtrak and the Connecticut Department of Transportation's CT Rail, and in addition to its termini serves New Haven State Street, Wallingford, Meriden, Berlin, Hartford, Windsor, and Windsor Locks. Several infill stations are planned to be added in the near future as of 2021. Amtrak's Vermonter runs from Washington to St. Albans, Vermont via the same line. In July 2019, Amtrak launched the Valley Flyer, which runs between New Haven and Greenfield, Massachusetts.

A proposed commuter rail service, the Central Corridor Rail Line, would connect New London with Norwich, Willimantic, Storrs via the main campus of the University of Connecticut, and Stafford Springs, with service continuing into Massachusetts and Brattleboro, Vermont. The proposal also adds stops to service popular tourist destinations Foxwoods Resort Casino and Mohegan Sun.

=== Bus ===
Statewide bus service is supplied by Connecticut Transit, owned by the Connecticut Department of Transportation, with smaller municipal authorities providing local service. Bus networks are an important part of the transportation system in Connecticut, especially in urban areas like Hartford, Stamford, Norwalk, Bridgeport and New Haven. Connecticut Transit also operates CTfastrak, a bus rapid transit service between New Britain and Hartford, which opened to the public on March 28, 2015.

=== Air ===
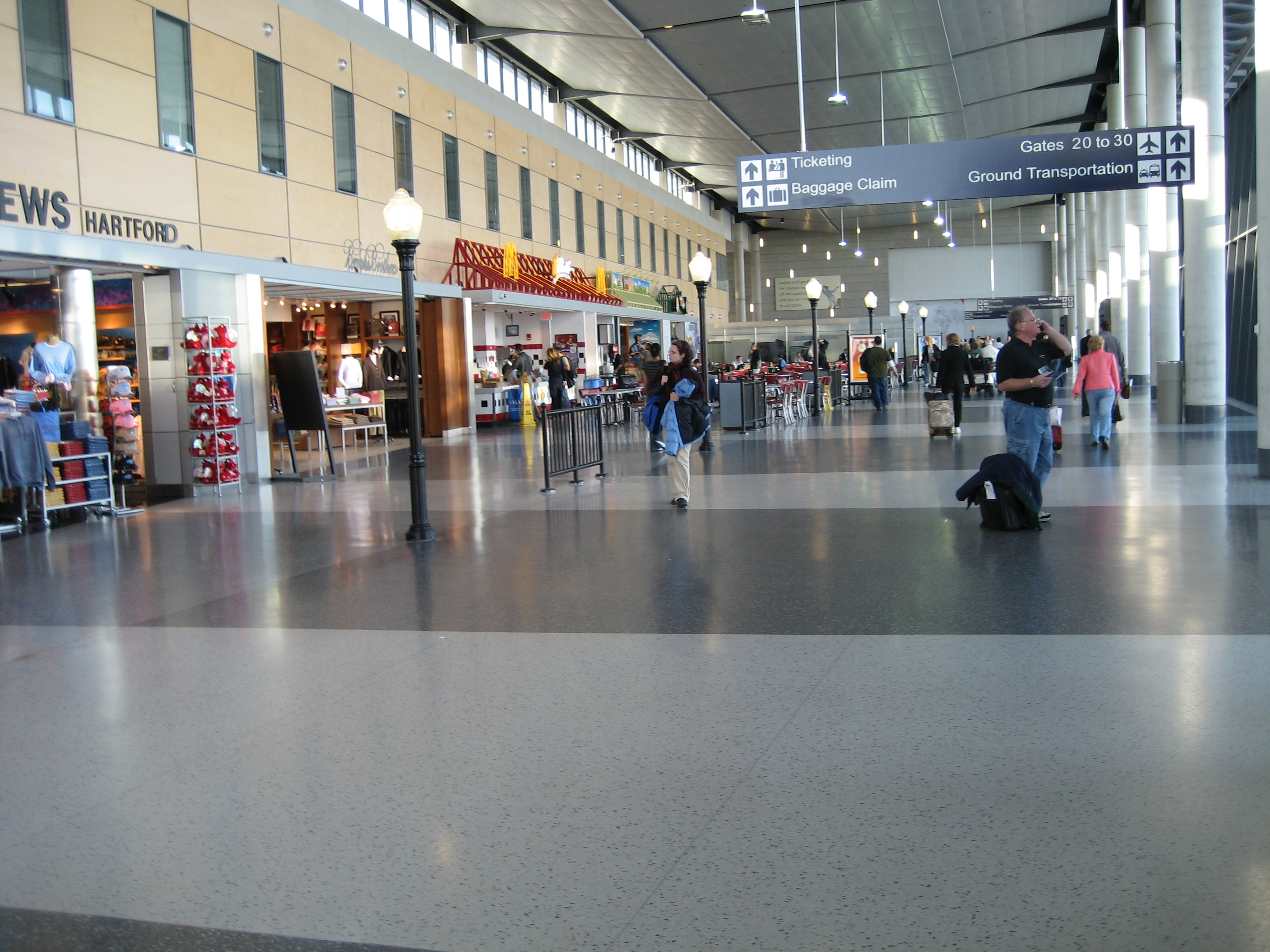
Bradley International Airport, the state's largest

Connecticut's largest airport is Bradley International Airport in Windsor Locks, 15 miles (24 km) north of Hartford. Many residents of central and southern Connecticut also make heavy use of JFK International Airport and Newark International Airports, especially for international travel. Smaller regional air service is provided at Tweed New Haven Regional Airport. Larger civil airports include Danbury Municipal Airport and Waterbury-Oxford Airport in western Connecticut, Hartford–Brainard Airport in central Connecticut, and Groton-New London Airport in eastern Connecticut. Sikorsky Memorial Airport is located in Stratford and mostly services cargo, helicopter and private aviation.

=== Ferry ===
Several ferry services cross Long Island Sound and connect the state to Long Island. The Bridgeport & Port Jefferson Ferry travels between Bridgeport, Connecticut, and Port Jefferson, New York. Ferry service also operates out of New London to Orient, New York; Fishers Island, New York; and Block Island, Rhode Island, which are popular tourist destinations. Two ferries cross the Connecticut River: the Rocky Hill–Glastonbury ferry and the Chester–Hadlyme ferry, the former of which is the oldest continuously operating ferry in the United States, operating since 1655.

== Law and government ==
Logo for the State of Connecticut.

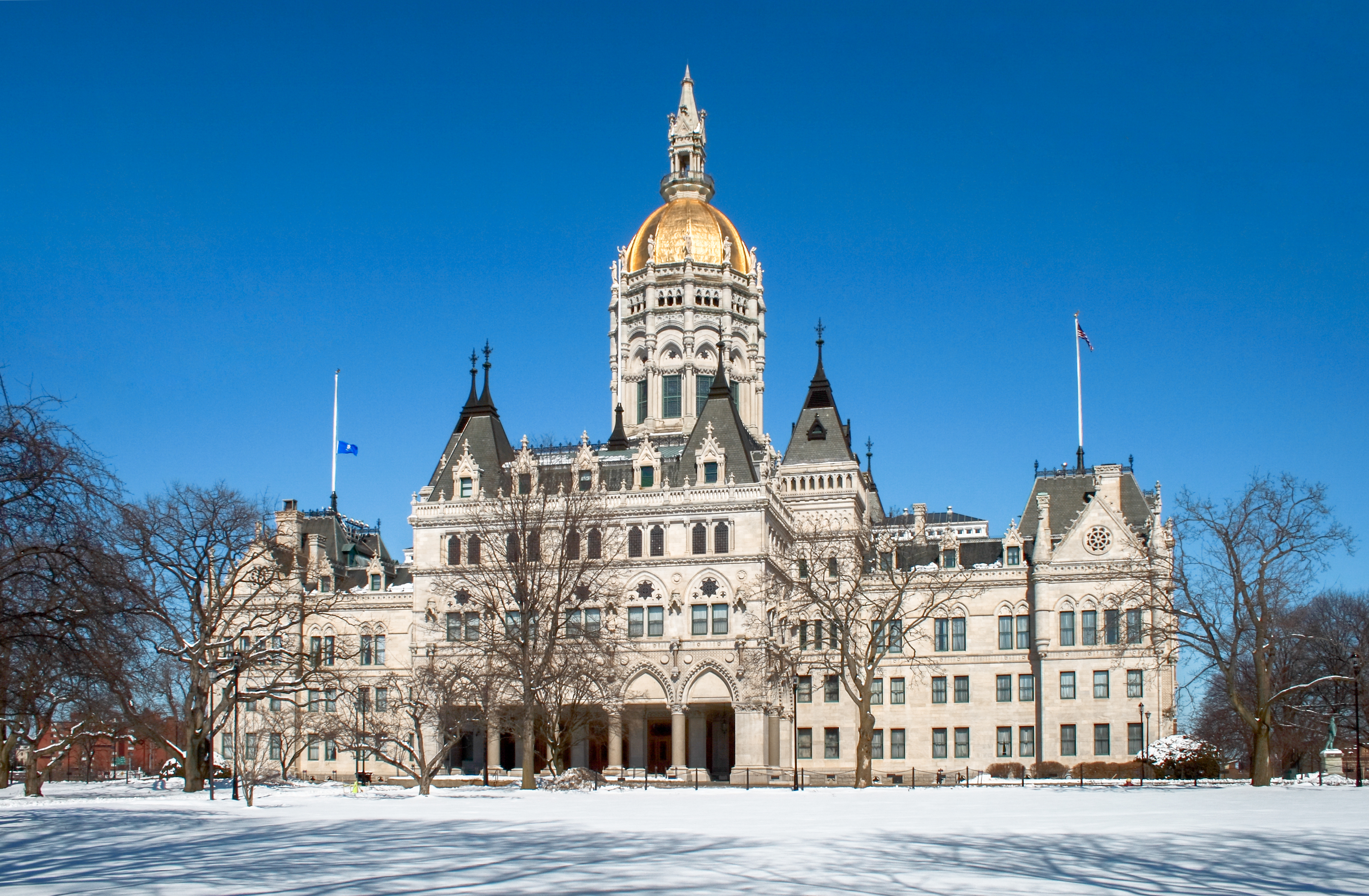
The Connecticut State Capitol in downtown Hartford

Hartford has been the sole capital of Connecticut since 1875. Before then, New Haven and Hartford alternated as dual capitals.

=== Constitutional history ===
Connecticut is known as the "Constitution State". The origin of this nickname is uncertain, but it likely comes from Connecticut's pivotal role in the federal constitutional convention of 1787, during which Roger Sherman and Oliver Ellsworth helped to orchestrate what became known as the Connecticut Compromise, or the Great Compromise. This plan combined the Virginia Plan and the New Jersey Plan to form a bicameral legislature, a form copied by almost every state constitution since the adoption of the federal constitution. Variations of the bicameral legislature had been proposed by Virginia and New Jersey, but Connecticut's plan was the one that was in effect until the early 20th century, when Senators ceased to be selected by their state legislatures and were instead directly elected. Otherwise, it is still the design of Congress.

The nickname also might refer to the Fundamental Orders of 1638–39. These Fundamental Orders represent the framework for the first formal Connecticut state government written by a representative body in Connecticut. The State of Connecticut government has operated under the direction of four separate documents in the course of the state's constitutional history. After the Fundamental Orders, Connecticut was granted governmental authority by King Charles II of England through the Connecticut Charter of 1662.

Separate branches of government did not exist during this period, and the General Assembly acted as the supreme authority. A constitution similar to the modern U.S. Constitution was not adopted in Connecticut until 1818. Finally, the current state constitution was implemented in 1965. The 1965 constitution absorbed a majority of its 1818 predecessor, but incorporated a handful of important modifications.

=== Executive ===
The governor heads the executive branch. As of 2020, Ned Lamont is the governor and Susan Bysiewicz is the Lieutenant Governor; both are Democrats. From 1639 until the adoption of the 1818 constitution, the governor presided over the General Assembly. In 1974, Ella Grasso was elected as the governor of Connecticut. This was the first time in United States history when a woman was a governor without her husband being governor first.

There are several executive departments: Administrative Services, Agriculture, Banking, Children and Families, Consumer Protection, Correction, Economic and Community Development, Developmental Services, Construction Services, Education, Emergency Management and Public Protection, Energy & Environmental Protection, Higher Education, Insurance, Labor, Mental Health and Addiction Services, Military, Motor Vehicles, Public Health, Public Utility Regulatory Authority, Revenue Services, Social Services, Transportation, and Veterans Affairs. In addition to these departments, there are other independent bureaus, offices and commissions.

In addition to the governor and lieutenant governor, there are four other executive officers named in the state constitution that are elected directly by voters: secretary of the state, treasurer, comptroller, and attorney general. All executive officers are elected to four-year terms.

=== Legislative ===
Connecticut's legislative branch is known as the General Assembly. It is a bicameral legislature consisting of an upper body, the State Senate (36 senators); and a lower body, the House of Representatives (151 representatives). Bills must pass each house in order to become law. The governor can veto bills, but this veto can be overridden by a two-thirds majority in both houses. Per Article XV of the state constitution, Senators and Representatives must be at least 18 years of age and are elected to two-year terms in November on even-numbered years. There also must always be between 30 and 50 senators and 125 to 225 representatives. The Lieutenant Governor presides over the Senate, except when absent from the chamber, when the President pro tempore presides. The Speaker of the House presides over the House. As of 2021, Matthew Ritter is the Speaker of the House of Connecticut.

As of 2026, Connecticut's United States Senators are Richard Blumenthal (Democrat) and Chris Murphy (Democrat). Connecticut has five representatives in the U.S. House, all of whom are Democrats.

Locally elected representatives also develop local ordinances to govern cities and towns. The town ordinances often include noise control and zoning guidelines. However, the State of Connecticut also provides statewide ordinances for noise control as well.

The Connecticut Legislature has House and Senate Committees tasked with handling environmental concerns. These committees created the Connecticut Environmental Protection Act, passed in 1973, which gives Connecticut residents the ability to challenge and intervene when corporations propose initiatives that would cause environmental change. This ensures that the state will not authorize construction that would cause permanent pollution, damage, or destruction to Connecticut land.

While Connecticut has not created many bills of its own that relate to the environment, the State follows the Clean Air Act, which is a federal law that provides air quality standards that each state needs to meet. The Act also requires the state to enact methods to improve their air quality and reduce pollutants. Connecticut has met both Mercury and air toxicity standards, even with large power plants that release emissions.

=== Judicial ===
The highest court of Connecticut's judicial branch is the Connecticut Supreme Court, headed by the Chief Justice of Connecticut. The Supreme Court is responsible for deciding on the constitutionality of laws, or cases as they relate to the law. Its proceedings are similar to those of the United States Supreme Court: no testimony is given by witnesses, and the lawyers of the two sides each present oral arguments no longer than thirty minutes. Following a court proceeding, the court may take several months to arrive at a judgment. As of 2025, the chief justice is Raheem L. Mullins, who succeeded Richard A. Robinson in September 2024.

In 1818, the court became a separate entity, independent of the legislative and executive branches. The Connecticut Appellate Court is a lesser statewide court, and the Superior Courts are lower courts that resemble county courts of other states.

=== Local government ===
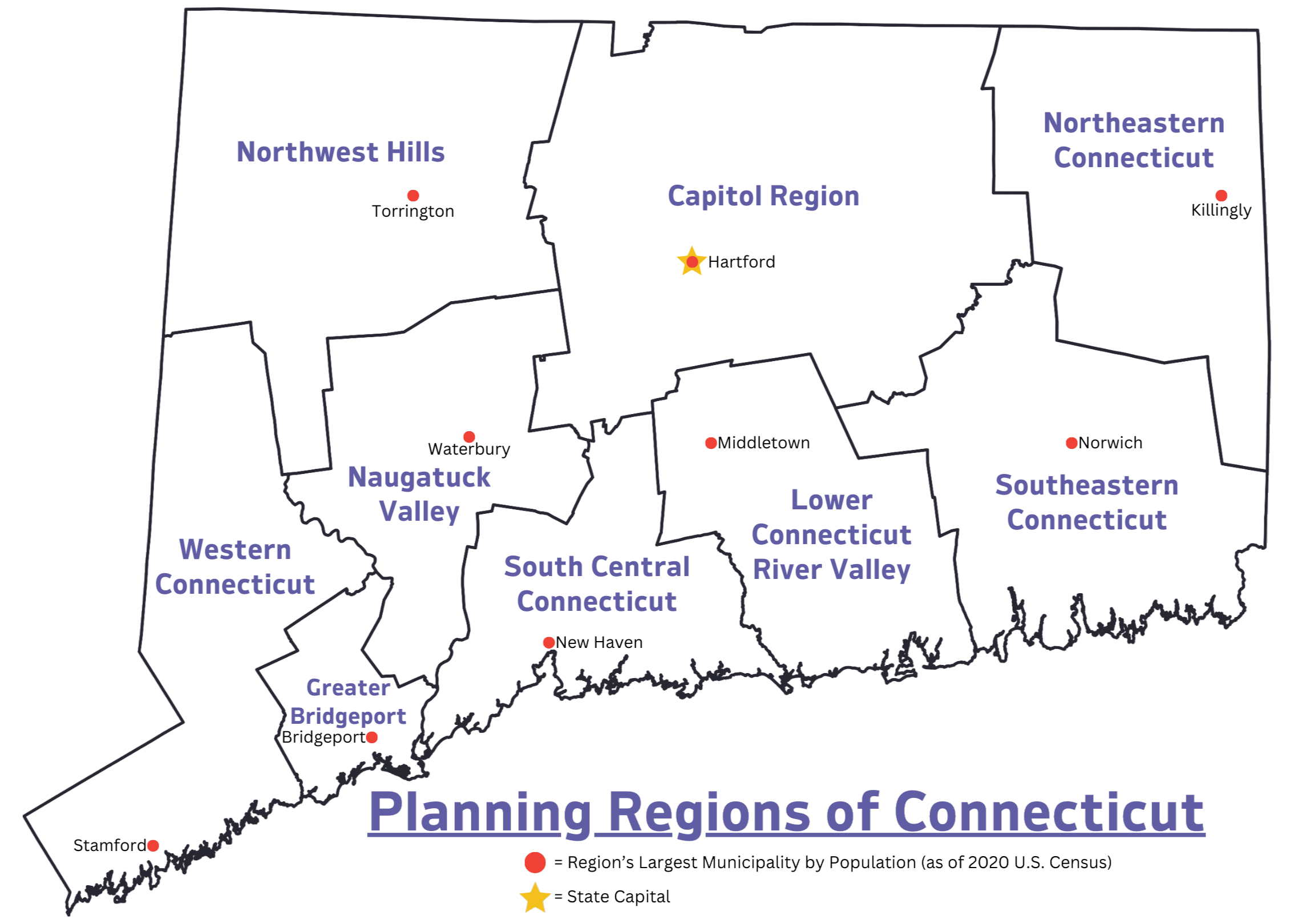
Planning Regions of Connecticut

Connecticut does not have county government, unlike all other states except Rhode Island. Connecticut county governments were mostly eliminated in 1960, with the exception of sheriffs elected in each county. In 2000, the county sheriff was abolished and replaced with the state marshal system, which has districts that follow the old county territories. The judicial system is divided into judicial districts at the trial-court level which largely follow the old county lines. The eight counties are still widely used for purely geographical and statistical purposes, such as weather reports and census reporting, although the latter ceased to use the counties in 2024.

The state is divided into nine regional councils of government defined by the state Office of Planning and Management, which facilitate regional planning and coordination of services between member towns. The Intragovernmental Policy Division of this Office coordinates regional planning with the administrative bodies of these regions. Each region has an administrative body made up chief executive officers of the member towns. The regions are established for the purpose of planning "coordination of regional and state planning activities; redesignation of logical planning regions and promotion of the continuation of regional planning organizations within the state; and provision for technical aid and the administration of financial assistance to regional planning organizations". By 2015, the State of Connecticut recognized COGs as county equivalents, allowing them to apply for funding and grants made available to county governments in other states. In 2019 the state recommended to the United States Census Bureau that the nine Councils of Governments replace its counties for statistical purposes. This proposal was approved by the Census Bureau in 2022 and was fully implemented by 2024.

Connecticut shares with the rest of New England a governmental institution called the New England town. The state is divided into 169 towns which serve as the fundamental political jurisdictions. There are also 21 cities, most of which simply follow the boundaries of their namesake towns and have a merged city-town government. There are two exceptions: the City of Groton, which is a subsection of the Town of Groton, and the City of Winsted in the Town of Winchester. There are also nine incorporated boroughs which may provide additional services to a section of town. Naugatuck is a consolidated town and borough.

== Politics ==
For many decades, Connecticut has consistently been a blue state. As of 2024, both of its U.S. Senators, all five of its U.S. House representatives, as well as its Governor, Lt. Governor, Attorney General, and Secretary of State, are members of the Democratic Party. The last Republican presidential candidate to win Connecticut's votes in the Electoral College was George H. W. Bush in 1988.

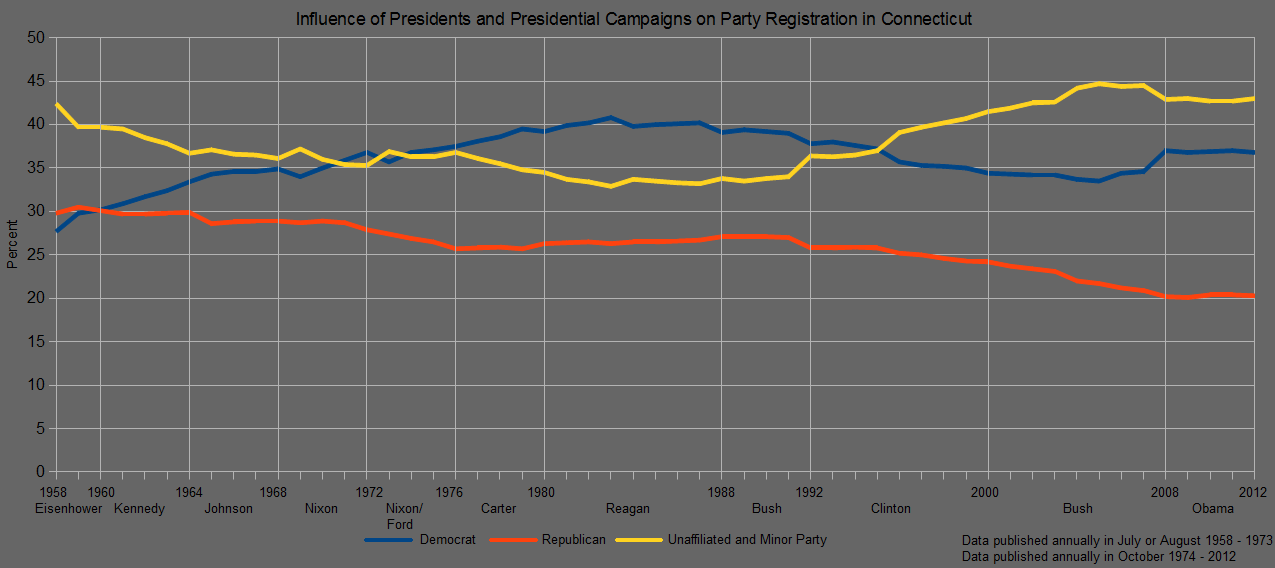
Connecticut political party registration 1958–2012, marked with presidential influence

=== Registered voters ===
Connecticut residents who register to vote may declare an affiliation to a political party, may become unaffiliated at will, and may change affiliations subject to certain waiting periods. As of 2022, around 58% of registered voters are enrolled in a political party. The Democratic Party of Connecticut is the largest party in the state by voter registration, with 36% of voters, followed by the Connecticut Republican Party with approximately 21%. An additional 1.6% are registered to third parties. As of 2022, 4 third parties have statewide enrollment privileges (meaning any state resident may register as a member), including the Libertarian Party of Connecticut, the Independent Party of Connecticut, the Connecticut Green Party, and the Connecticut Working Families Party. Connecticut allows electoral fusion, where the same candidate can run on the ballot of more than one political party; this is often used by the Connecticut Working Families Party to cross-endorse Democratic candidates.

Party registration as of October 31, 2024
Party	Total voters	Percentage
Unaffiliated	1,066,435	42.1%
Democratic	900,721	35.6%
Republican	524,977	20.7%
Minor parties	39,466	1.6%
Total	2,531,599	100%

=== Voting ===
In July 2009, the Connecticut legislature overrode a veto by Governor M. Jodi Rell to pass SustiNet, the first significant public-option health care reform legislation in the nation.

In April 2012, both houses of the Connecticut state legislature passed a bill (20 to 16 and 86 to 62) that abolished capital punishment for all future crimes, while 11 inmates who were waiting on the death row at the time could still be executed.

== Education ==
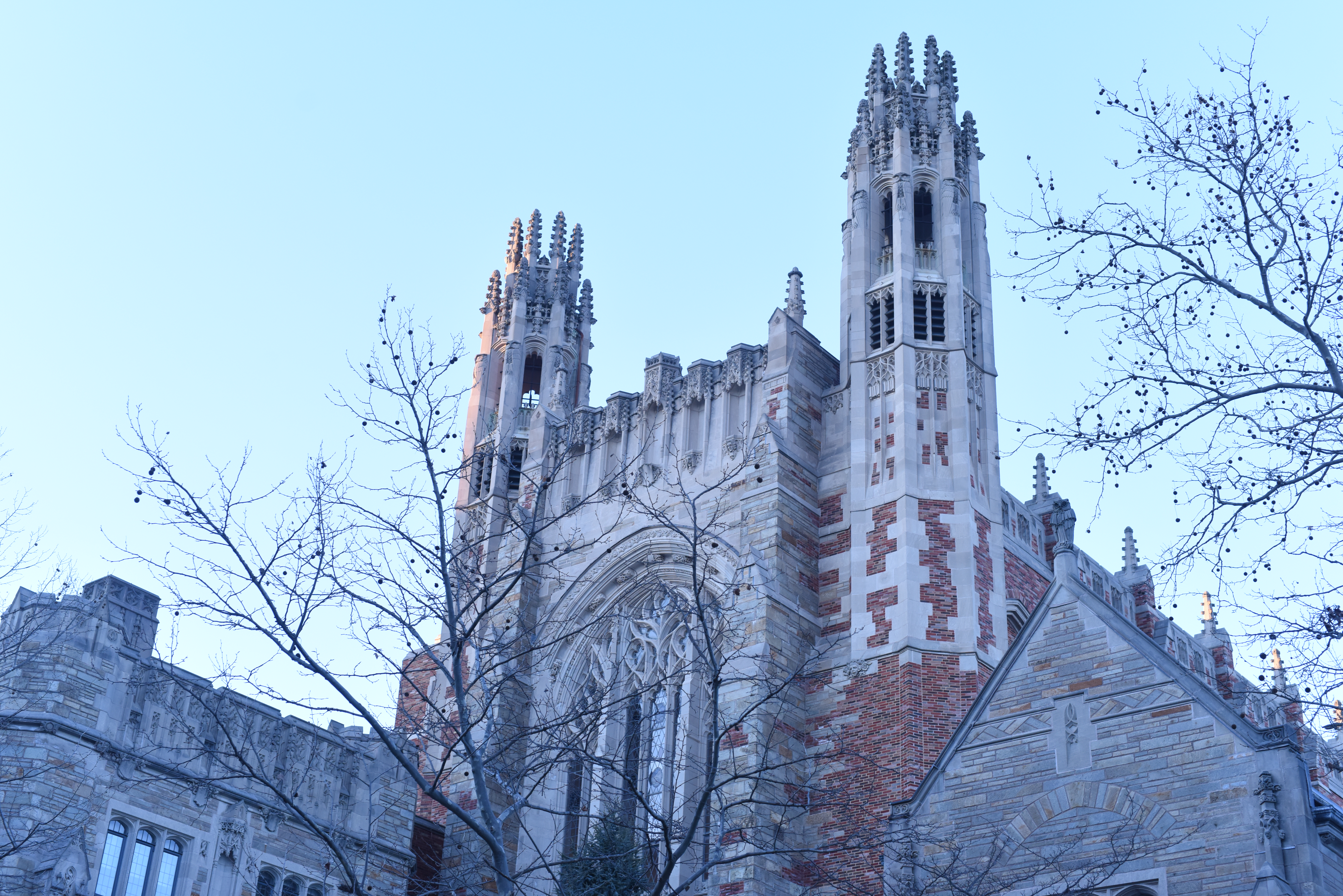
Yale's motto means "light and truth".

Connecticut ranked third in the nation for educational performance, according to Education Week's Quality Counts 2018 report. It earned an overall score of 83.5 out of 100 points. On average, the country received a score of 75.2. Connecticut posted a B-plus in the Chance-for-Success category, ranking fourth on factors that contribute to a person's success both within and outside the K-12 education system. Connecticut received a mark of B-plus and finished fourth for School Finance. It ranked 12th with a grade of C on the K-12 Achievement Index.

=== K–12 ===
==== Public schools ====
Hartford Public High School (1638) is the third-oldest secondary school in the nation after the Collegiate School (1628) in Manhattan and the Boston Latin School (1635). Today, the Connecticut State Board of Education manages the public school system for children in grades K–12. Board of Education members are appointed by the governor of Connecticut.

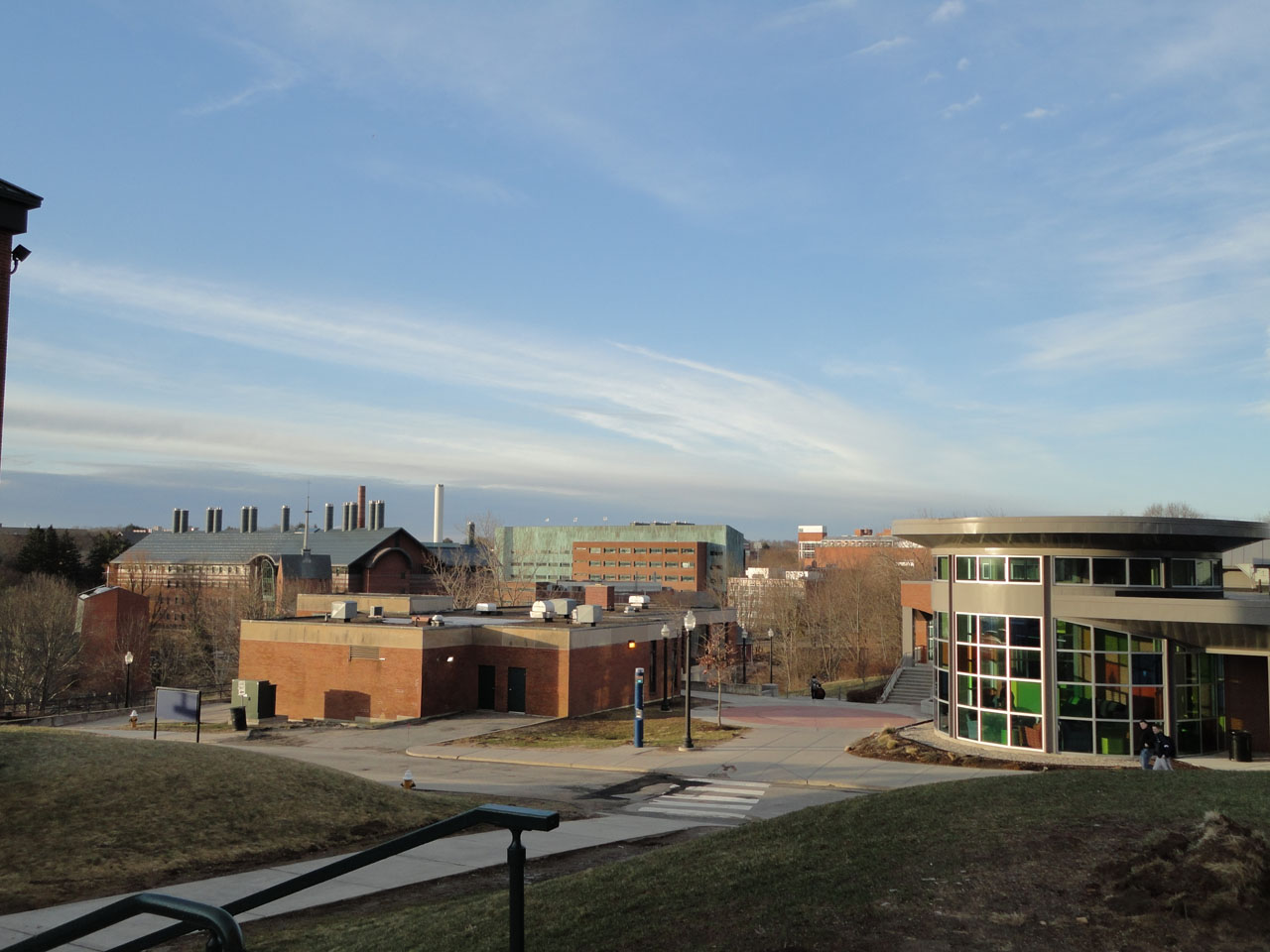
University of Connecticut, the state's main public university

==== Independent schools ====
Connecticut has a number of independent schools. Independent schools may file for approval by the state Department of Education, but are not required to. Per state law, independent schools must file yearly attendance reports with the state.

Notable independent schools include Choate Rosemary Hall, The Hotchkiss School, Loomis Chaffee School, and Taft School. The oldest independent school in the state, ranking third oldest in the United States, is Hopkins School, founded in 1660 by former Connecticut Colony governor Edward Hopkins.

=== Colleges and universities ===
Connecticut was home to the nation's first law school, Litchfield Law School, which operated from 1773 to 1833 in Litchfield. Well known universities in the state include Yale University, Wesleyan University, Trinity College, Sacred Heart University, Fairfield University, Quinnipiac University, and the University of Connecticut. The Connecticut State University System includes 4 state universities, and the state also has 12 community colleges. The United States Coast Guard Academy is located in New London.

== Sports ==
As of October 2026, Connecticut has no major league sports teams. The state has two minor league teams of American major leagues, both in Hartford. In hockey, The Hartford Wolf Pack is an affiliate of the New York Rangers; play in the PeoplesBank Arena; and the Hartford Yard Goats of the Eastern League are a AA affiliate of the Colorado Rockies, and play at Dunkin' Park. The Norwich Sea Unicorns and New Britain Bees play in the Futures Collegiate Baseball League.

Connecticut also has multiple soccer clubs: Hartford Athletic of the USL Championship plays at Trinity Health Stadium in Hartford, and CT United FC of MLS Next Pro currently plays throughout the state. The USL League Two team AC Connecticut plays in Danbury. Pratt & Whitney Stadium has hosted both the US Men's and Women's national teams on several occasions, most recently in 2025, as well as other international friendlies.

The state hosts several major sporting events. Since 1952, a PGA Tour golf tournament has been played in the Hartford area. It was originally called the "Insurance City Open" and later the "Greater Hartford Open" and is now known as the Travelers Championship.

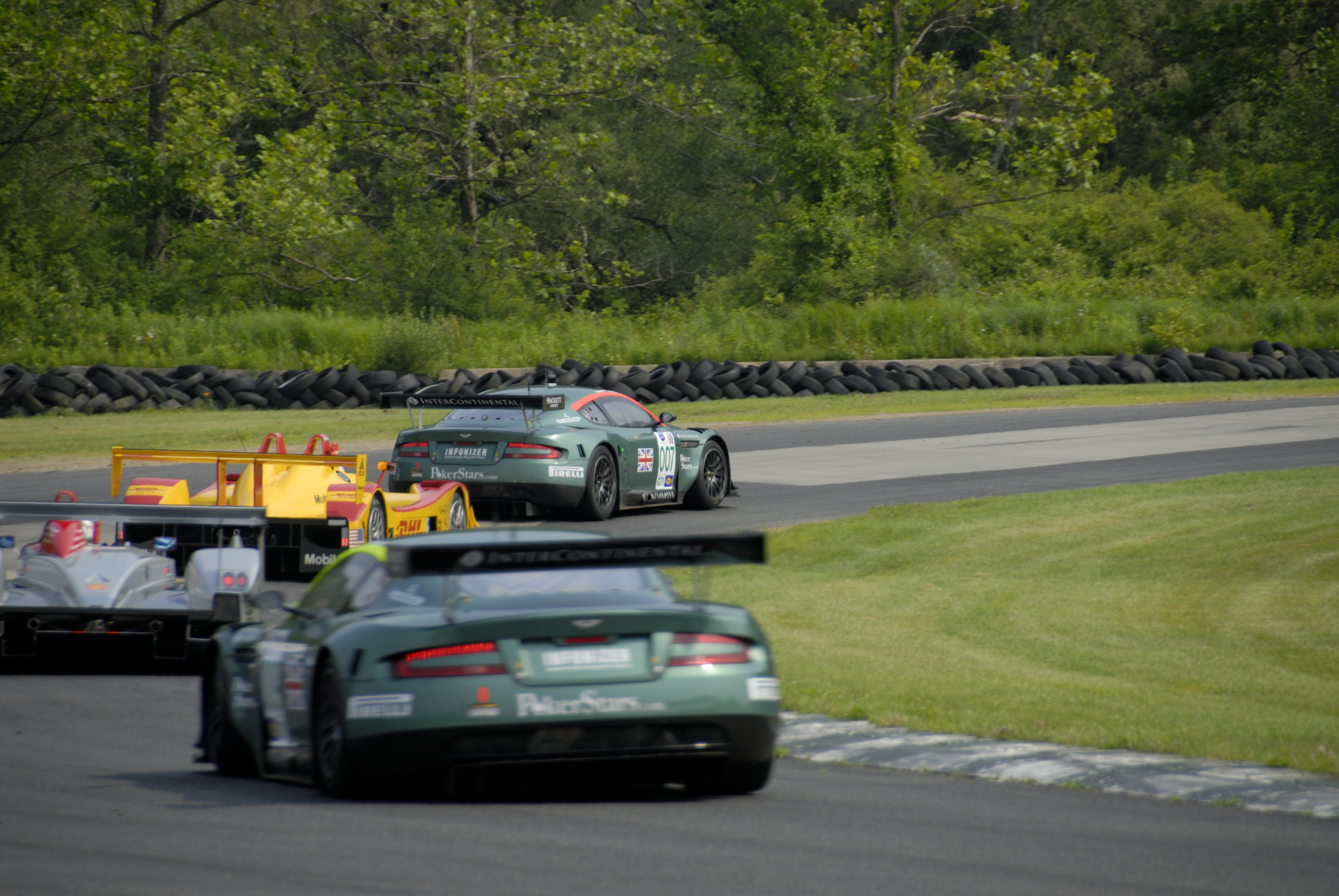
Lime Rock, a home of the American Le Mans Series

In motorsport, Lime Rock Park in Salisbury is a 1.5-mile (2.4 km) road racing course, home to the International Motor Sports Association, SCCA, United States Auto Club, and K&N Pro Series East races. Thompson International Speedway, Stafford Motor Speedway, and Waterford Speedbowl are oval tracks holding weekly races for NASCAR Modifieds and other classes, including the NASCAR Whelen Modified Tour. The state also hosts several major mixed martial arts events for Bellator MMA and the Ultimate Fighting Championship.

=== Former professional teams ===
The Connecticut Sun, formerly of the WNBA, played at the Mohegan Sun Arena in Uncasville from 2003 to 2026. They were relocated to Houston to become the Comets in 2027.

The Hartford Whalers of the National Hockey League played in Hartford from 1975 to 1997 at the Hartford Civic Center. They departed to Raleigh, North Carolina, after disputes with the state over the construction of a new arena, and they are now known as the Carolina Hurricanes.

A baseball team known as the Hartfords (or Hartford Dark Blues) played in the National Association from 1874 to 1875, before becoming charter members of the National League in 1876. The team moved to Brooklyn, New York, and then disbanded one season later. In 1926, Hartford also had a franchise in the National Football League known as the Hartford Blues.

From 2000 until 2006 the city was home to the Hartford FoxForce of World TeamTennis.

Team	Sport	League
Hartford Wolf Pack	Ice hockey	American Hockey League
Hartford Yard Goats	Baseball	Eastern League
Norwich Sea Unicorns	Baseball	Futures Collegiate Baseball League
New Britain Bees	Baseball	Futures Collegiate Baseball League
Hartford Athletic	Soccer	USL Championship
AC Connecticut	Soccer	USL League Two

=== College sports ===
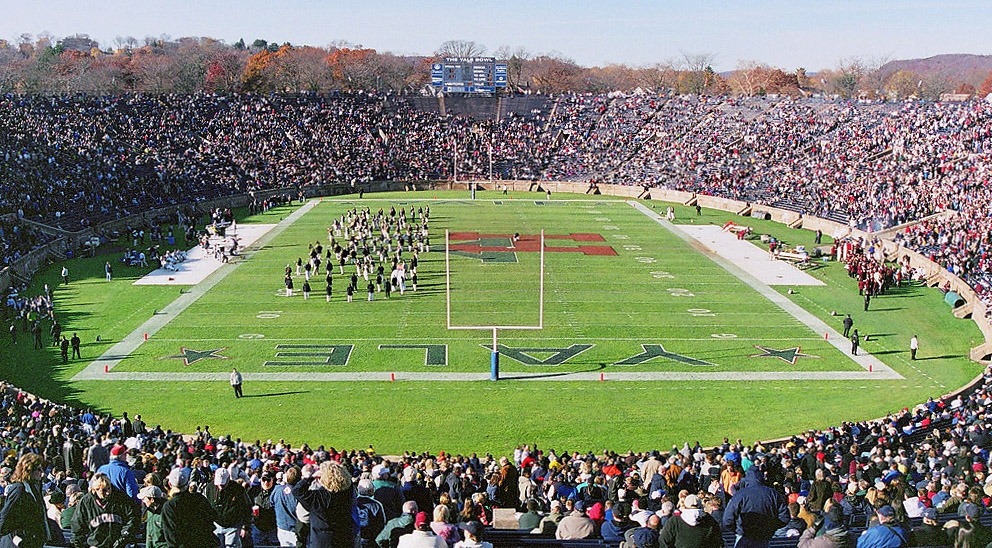
Yale Bowl during "The Game" between Yale and Harvard. The Bowl was also the home of the NFL's New York Giants in 1973–74.

The Connecticut Huskies are the team of the University of Connecticut (UConn); they play NCAA Division I sports. Both the men's basketball and women's basketball teams have won multiple national championships. In 2004, UConn became the first school in NCAA Division I history to have its men's and women's basketball programs win the national title in the same year; they repeated the feat in 2014 and are still the only Division I school to win both titles in the same year. The UConn women's basketball team holds the record for the longest consecutive winning streak in NCAA college basketball at 111 games, a streak that ended in 2017. Both teams play in the historic Harry A. Gampel Pavilion and PeoplesBank Arena in Hartford. The UConn Huskies football team has played its home games at Rentschler Field in East Hartford since 2003.

New Haven biennially hosts "The Game" between the Yale Bulldogs and the Harvard Crimson, the country's second-oldest college football rivalry. Yale alumnus Walter Camp is deemed the "Father of American Football", and he helped develop modern football while living in New Haven. Other Connecticut universities which feature Division I sports teams are Quinnipiac University, Fairfield University, Central Connecticut State University and Sacred Heart University.

== Etymology and symbols ==
State symbols of Connecticut
List of state symbols
- Flag of Connecticut

- Seal of Connecticut

- Coat of arms of Connecticut
- Motto: Qui transtulit sustinet Latin; "He Who Transplanted Still Sustains"
- Slogan: Full of Surprises
- Song: "Yankee Doodle"; "The Nutmeg"

Living insignia
- Bird: American robin
- Fish: American shad
- Flower: Mountain laurel
- Insect: European mantis
- Mammal: Sperm whale
- Tree: Charter Oak, a white oak

Inanimate insignia
- Dance: Square dance
- Fossil: Dinosaur tracks
- Mineral: Garnet
- Shell: Eastern oyster
- Ship: USS Nautilus (SSN-571), Freedom Schooner Amistad
- Tartan: Connecticut State Tartan

State route marker

State quarter
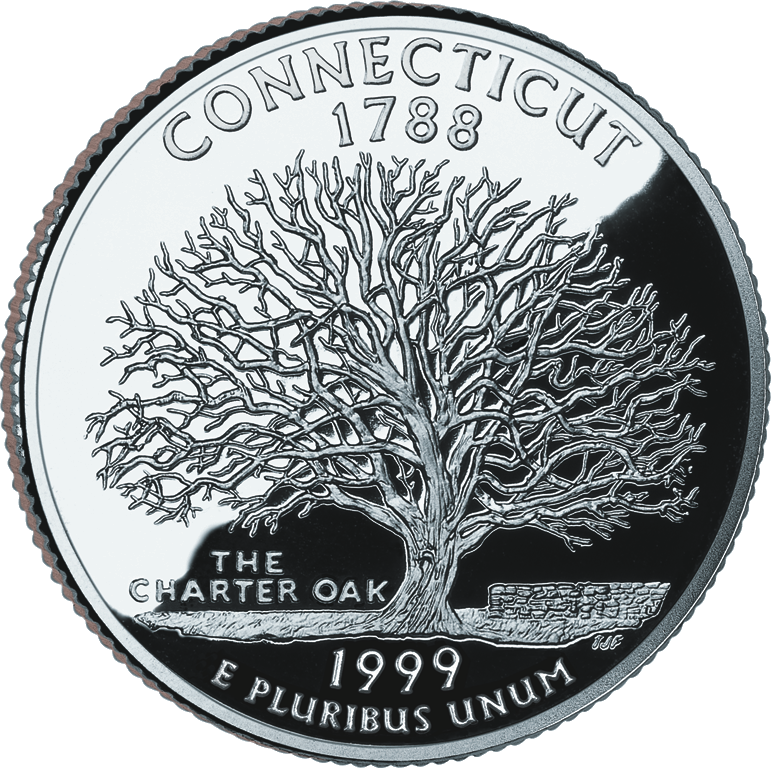
- Released in 1999

The name "Connecticut" originated with the Mohegan word quonehtacut, meaning "place of long tidal river". Connecticut's official nickname is "The Constitution State", adopted in 1959 and based on its colonial constitution of 1638–1639 which was the first in America and, arguably, the world. Connecticut is also unofficially known as "The Nutmeg State", whose origin is unknown. It may have come from its sailors returning from voyages with nutmeg, which was a very valuable spice in the 18th and 19th centuries. It may have originated in the early machined sheet tin nutmeg grinders sold by early Connecticut peddlers. It is also facetiously said to come from Yankee peddlers from Connecticut who would sell small carved knobs of wood shaped to look like nutmeg to unsuspecting customers. George Washington gave Connecticut the title of "The Provisions State" because of the material aid that the state rendered to the American Revolutionary War effort. Connecticut is also known as "The Land of Steady Habits".

According to Webster's New International Dictionary (1993), a person who is a native or resident of Connecticut is a "Connecticuter". There are numerous other terms coined in print but not in use, such as "Connecticotian" (Cotton Mather in 1702) and "Connecticutensian" (Samuel Peters in 1781). Linguist Allen Walker Read suggests the more playful term "Connecticutie". "Nutmegger" is sometimes used, as is "Yankee".

The official state song is "Yankee Doodle". The traditional abbreviation of the state's name is "Conn."; the official postal abbreviation is CT.

Commemorative stamps issued by the United States Postal Service with Connecticut themes include Nathan Hale, Eugene O'Neill, Josiah Willard Gibbs, Noah Webster, Eli Whitney, the whaling ship the Charles W. Morgan, which is docked at Mystic Seaport, and a decoy of a broadbill duck.

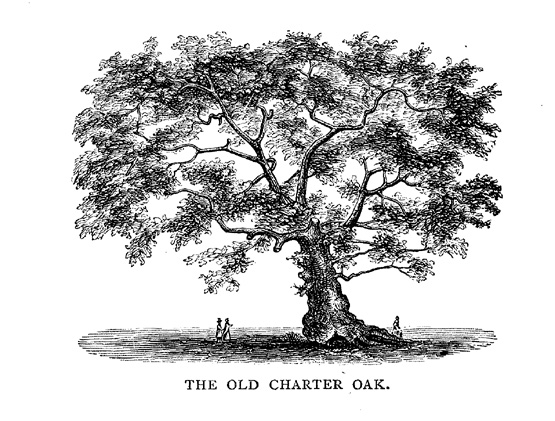
The Charter Oak

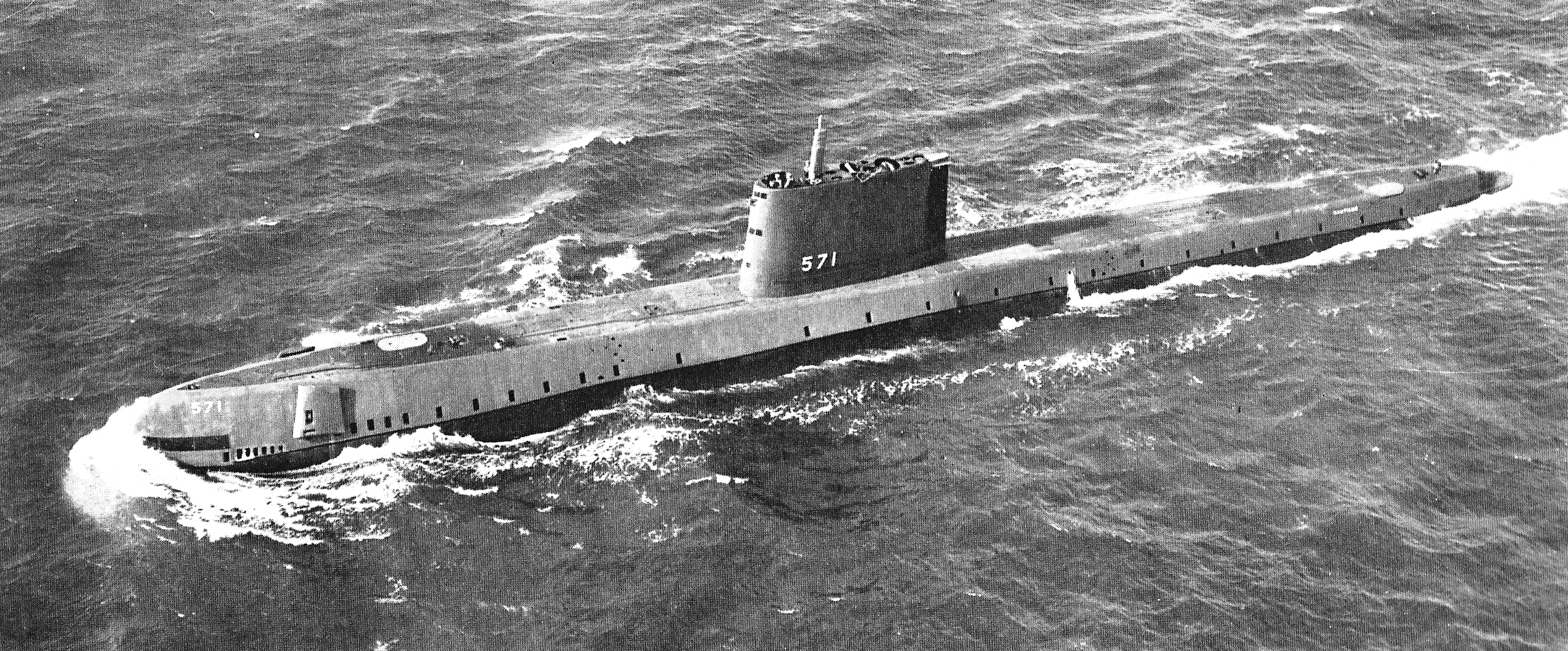
The USS Nautilus (SSN-571)

Connecticut state insignia and historical figures^{Source Sites, Seals & Symbols except where noted.}
State aircraft	Vought F4U Corsair
State hero	Nathan Hale
State heroine	Prudence Crandall
State composer	Charles Edward Ives
State statues in Statuary Hall	Roger Sherman and Jonathan Trumbull
State poet laureate	Margaret Gibson
Connecticut State Troubadour	Kala Farnham
State composer laureate	Jacob Druckman

== See also ==
- Index of Connecticut-related articles
- Outline of Connecticut
- List of states and territories of the United States
- USS Connecticut, 7 ships

== Notes ==
Preceded by Georgia	List of U.S. states by date of admission to the Union; Ratified Constitution on January 9, 1788 (5th)	Succeeded by Massachusetts
