= Index of Connecticut-related articles =

The location of the state of Connecticut in the United States of America

The following is an alphabetical list of articles related to the U.S. state of Connecticut.

== 0–9 ==
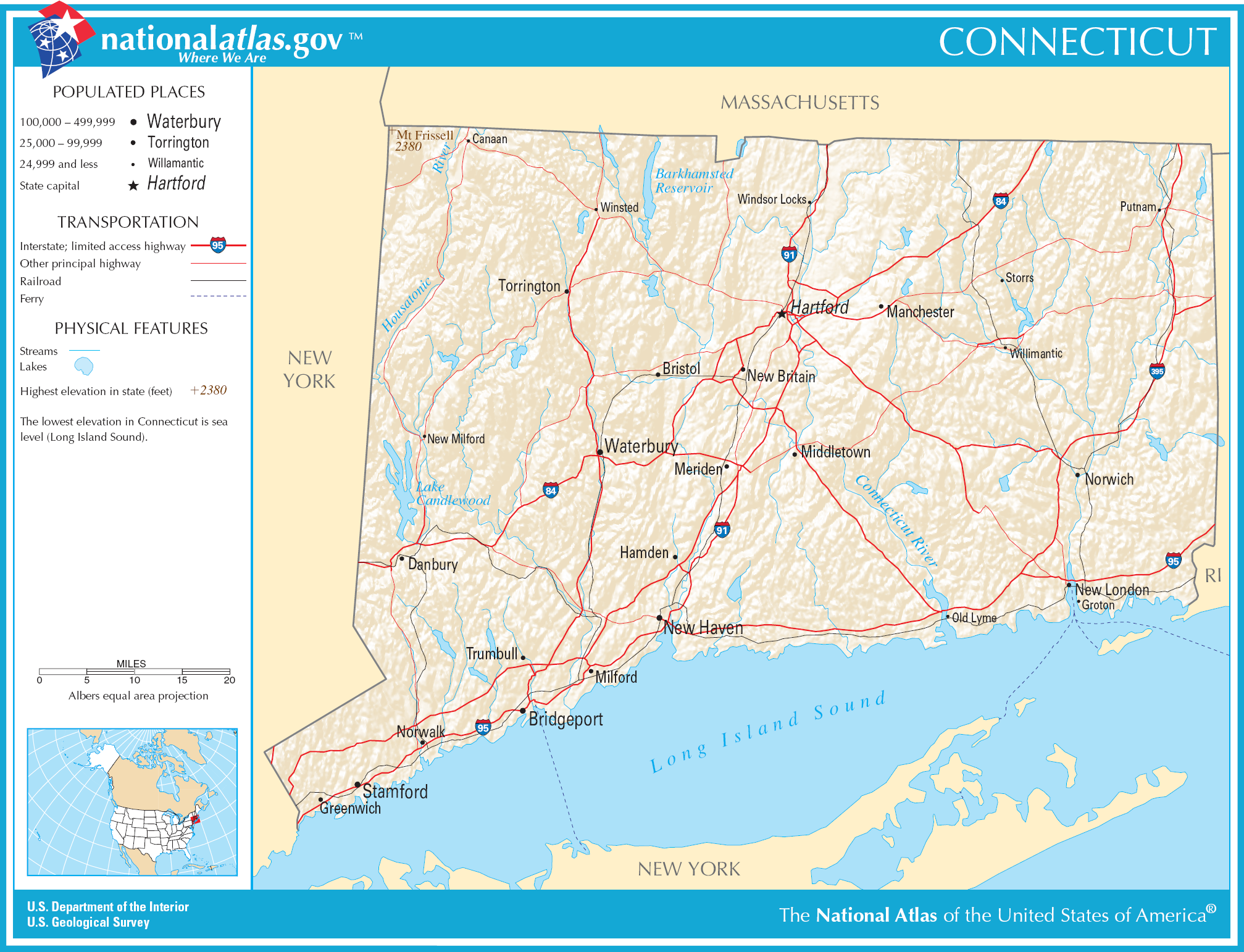
An enlargeable map of the state of Connecticut

- .ct.us – Internet second-level domain for the state of Connecticut
- 5th state to ratify the Constitution of the United States of America

== A ==
- Adjacent states:
  - Commonwealth of Massachusetts
  - State of New York
  - State of Rhode Island
- Agriculture in Connecticut
- Airports in Connecticut
- Amusement parks in Connecticut
- Aquaria in Connecticut
  - commons:Category:Aquaria in Connecticut
- Arboreta in Connecticut
  - commons:Category:Arboreta in Connecticut
- Archaeology in Connecticut
- Architecture in Connecticut
- Area codes in Connecticut
- Art museums and galleries in Connecticut
  - commons:Category:Art museums and galleries in Connecticut
- Astronomical observatories in Connecticut
  - commons:Category:Astronomical observatories in Connecticut

== B ==
- Beaches of Connecticut
  - commons:Category:Beaches of Connecticut
- Botanical gardens in Connecticut
  - commons:Category:Botanical gardens in Connecticut
- Bridgeport, Connecticut
- Buildings and structures in Connecticut
  - commons:Category:Buildings and structures in Connecticut

== C ==
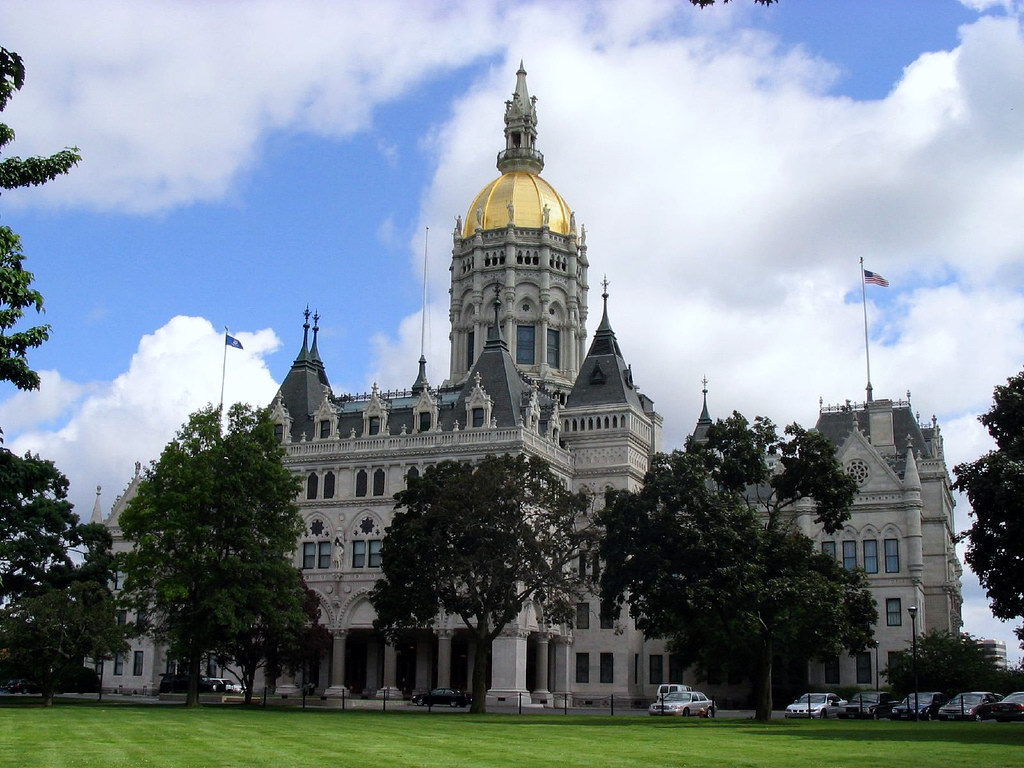
The Connecticut State Capitol in Hartford

- Capital of the State of Connecticut
- Capitol of the State of Connecticut
  - commons:Category:Connecticut State Capitol
- Casinos in Connecticut
- Census statistical areas of Connecticut
- Cities in Connecticut
  - commons:Category:Cities in Connecticut
- Climate of Connecticut
- Climate change in Connecticut
- Colony of Connecticut, 1636–1686 and 1689–1776
- Colony of New-Haven, 1637–1662
- Colleges and universities in Connecticut
  - commons:Category:Universities and colleges in Connecticut
- Communications in Connecticut
  - commons:Category:Communications in Connecticut
- Companies in Connecticut
  - Category:Companies based in Connecticut
- Congressional districts of Connecticut
- Connecticut website
  - Category:Connecticut
    - commons:Category:Connecticut
      - commons:Category:Maps of Connecticut
- Connecticut Business Hall of Fame
- Connecticut College Black Womanhood Conference
- Connecticut Constitutional History
- Connecticut Environmental Policy Act
- The Connecticut March
- Connecticut Port Authority
- Connecticut State Capitol
- Connecticut State News Bureau
- Connecticut State Police

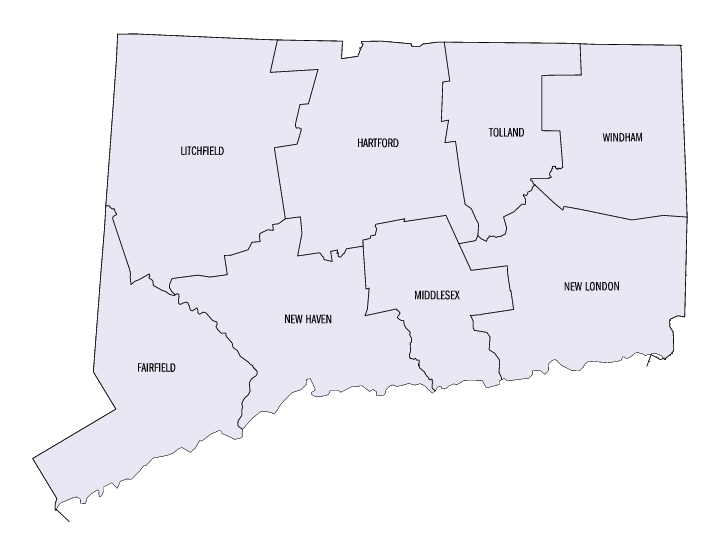
An enlargeable map of the 8 counties of the state of Connecticut

- Connecticut State Troubadour
- Constitution of the State of Connecticut
- Convention centers in Connecticut
  - commons:Category:Convention centers in Connecticut
- Counties of the state of Connecticut
  - commons:Category:Counties in Connecticut
- CT – United States Postal Service postal code for the state of Connecticut
- Culture of Connecticut
  - commons:Category:Connecticut culture

== D ==
- Demographics of Connecticut
- Dominion of New-England in America, 1686–1689

== E ==
- Economy of Connecticut
  - Category:Economy of Connecticut
    - commons:Category:Economy of Connecticut
- Education in Connecticut
  - Category:Education in Connecticut
    - commons:Category:Education in Connecticut
- Elections in Connecticut
  - Category:Elections in Connecticut
    - commons:Category:Elections in Connecticut
- Environment of Connecticut
  - commons:Category:Environment of Connecticut

== F ==
The flag of the state of Connecticut

- Festivals in Connecticut
  - commons:Category:Festivals in Connecticut
- Flag of the state of Connecticut
- Forts in Connecticut
  - Category:Forts in Connecticut
    - commons:Category:Forts in Connecticut
- Fundamental Orders of Connecticut, 1638

== G ==
- Gardens in Connecticut
  - commons:Category:Gardens in Connecticut
- Geography of Connecticut
  - Category:Geography of Connecticut
    - commons:Category:Geography of Connecticut
- Geology of Connecticut
  - Category:Geology of Connecticut
    - commons:Category:Geology of Connecticut
- Ghost towns in Connecticut
  - Category:Ghost towns in Connecticut
    - commons:Category:Ghost towns in Connecticut
- Golf clubs and courses in Connecticut
- Government of the state of Connecticut website
  - Category:Government of Connecticut
    - commons:Category:Government of Connecticut
- Governor of the State of Connecticut
  - List of governors of Connecticut
- Great Seal of the State of Connecticut

== H ==
- Hartford, Connecticut, colonial capital 1639-1686 and 1689–1701, co-capital 1701–1875, sole state capital since 1875
- Heritage railroads in Connecticut
  - commons:Category:Heritage railroads in Connecticut
- High schools of Connecticut
- Higher education in Connecticut
- Highway routes in Connecticut
- Hiking trails in Connecticut
  - commons:Category:Hiking trails in Connecticut
- History of Connecticut
  - Historical outline of Connecticut
    - Category:History of Connecticut
      - commons:Category:History of Connecticut
- Hospitals in Connecticut
- House of Representatives of the State of Connecticut

== I ==
- Images of Connecticut
  - commons:Category:Connecticut
- Islands of Connecticut

== L ==
- Lake Compounce in Bristol, Connecticut (an amusement park)
- Lakes of Connecticut
  - commons:Category:Lakes of Connecticut
- Landmarks in Connecticut
  - commons:Category:Landmarks in Connecticut
- Lieutenant Governor of the State of Connecticut
- Lists related to the state of Connecticut:
  - List of airports in Connecticut
  - List of census statistical areas in Connecticut
  - List of cities in Connecticut
  - List of colleges and universities in Connecticut
  - List of companies in Connecticut
  - List of United States congressional districts in Connecticut
  - List of counties in Connecticut
  - List of forts in Connecticut
  - List of ghost towns in Connecticut
  - List of governors of Connecticut
  - List of high schools in Connecticut
  - List of highway routes in Connecticut
  - List of hospitals in Connecticut
  - List of individuals executed in Connecticut
  - List of law enforcement agencies in Connecticut
  - List of lieutenant governors of Connecticut
  - List of museums in Connecticut
  - List of National Historic Landmarks in Connecticut
  - List of people from Connecticut
  - List of radio stations in Connecticut
  - List of railroads in Connecticut
  - List of Registered Historic Places in Connecticut
  - List of rivers of Connecticut
  - List of school districts in Connecticut
  - List of state forests in Connecticut
  - List of state parks in Connecticut
  - List of state prisons in Connecticut
  - List of state symbols of Connecticut
  - List of telephone area codes in Connecticut
  - List of television shows set in Connecticut
  - List of television stations in Connecticut
  - List of towns in Connecticut
  - List of Connecticut's congressional delegations
  - List of United States congressional districts in Connecticut
  - List of United States representatives from Connecticut
  - List of United States senators from Connecticut

== M ==
- Maps of Connecticut
  - commons:Category:Maps of Connecticut
- Mass media in Connecticut
- Monuments and memorials in Connecticut
  - commons:Category:Monuments and memorials in Connecticut
- Mountains of Connecticut
  - commons:Category:Mountains of Connecticut
- Museums in Connecticut
  - Category:Museums in Connecticut
  - commons:Category:Museums in Connecticut
- Music of Connecticut
  - Category:Music of Connecticut
    - commons:Category:Music of Connecticut
  - Category:Musical groups from Connecticut
  - Category:Musicians from Connecticut

== N ==
- Natural history of Connecticut
  - commons:Category:Natural history of Connecticut
- Nature centers in Connecticut
  - commons:Category:Nature centers in Connecticut
- New England
- New-Haven, capital of Colony of New-Haven 1640–1662, colonial and state co-capital 1701–1875
- New York-Newark-Bridgeport, NY-NJ-CT-PA Combined Statistical Area
- Newspapers of Connecticut

== P ==
- People from Connecticut
  - Category:People from Connecticut
    - commons:Category:People from Connecticut
    - Category:People from Connecticut by populated place
    - Category:People from Connecticut by county
    - Category:People from Connecticut by occupation
- Pequot War, 1636–1637
- Politics of Connecticut
- Portal:Connecticut
- Protected areas of Connecticut
  - commons:Category:Protected areas of Connecticut

== R ==
- Radio stations in Connecticut
- Railroad museums in Connecticut
  - commons:Category:Railroad museums in Connecticut
- Railroads in Connecticut
- Registered historic places in Connecticut
  - commons:Category:Registered Historic Places in Connecticut
- Religion in Connecticut
  - Category:Religion in Connecticut
    - commons:Category:Religion in Connecticut
- Rivers of Connecticut
  - commons:Category:Rivers of Connecticut

== S ==
- School districts of Connecticut
- Scouting in Connecticut
- Senate of the State of Connecticut
- Settlements in Connecticut
  - Cities in Connecticut
  - Towns in Connecticut
  - Villages in Connecticut
  - Census Designated Places in Connecticut
  - Other unincorporated communities in Connecticut
  - List of ghost towns in Connecticut
- Ski areas and resorts in Connecticut
  - commons:Category:Ski areas and resorts in Connecticut
- Sports in Connecticut
  - Category:Sports in Connecticut
    - commons:Category:Sports in Connecticut
  - Category:Sports venues in Connecticut
    - commons:Category:Sports venues in Connecticut
- State Capitol of Connecticut
- State of Connecticut website
  - Constitution of the State of Connecticut
  - Government of the State of Connecticut
    - Category:Government of Connecticut
      - commons:Category:Government of Connecticut
  - Executive branch of the government of the State of Connecticut
    - Governor of the State of Connecticut
  - Legislative branch of the government of the State of Connecticut
    - General Assembly of the State of Connecticut
      - Senate of the State of Connecticut
      - House of Representatives of the State of Connecticut
  - Judicial branch of the government of the State of Connecticut
    - Supreme Court of the State of Connecticut
- State parks of Connecticut
  - commons:Category:State parks of Connecticut
- State Police of Connecticut
- State prisons of Connecticut
- Structures in Connecticut
  - commons:Category:Buildings and structures in Connecticut
- Superfund sites in Connecticut
- Supreme Court of the State of Connecticut
- Symbols of the State of Connecticut
  - Category:Symbols of Connecticut
    - commons:Category:Symbols of Connecticut

== T ==
- Telecommunications in Connecticut
  - commons:Category:Communications in Connecticut
- Telephone area codes in Connecticut
- Television shows set in Connecticut
- Television stations in Connecticut
- Theatres in Connecticut
  - commons:Category:Theatres in Connecticut
- Tourism in Connecticut website
  - commons:Category:Tourism in Connecticut
- Towns in Connecticut
  - commons:Category:Cities in Connecticut
- Transportation in Connecticut
  - Category:Transportation in Connecticut
    - commons:Category:Transport in Connecticut

== U ==
- United States of America
  - States of the United States of America
  - United States census statistical areas of Connecticut
  - Connecticut's congressional delegations
  - United States congressional districts in Connecticut
  - United States Court of Appeals for the Second Circuit
  - United States District Court for the District of Connecticut
  - United States representatives from Connecticut
  - United States senators from Connecticut
- Universities and colleges in Connecticut
  - commons:Category:Universities and colleges in Connecticut
- US-CT – ISO 3166-2:US region code for the State of Connecticut

== W ==
- Waterfalls of Connecticut
  - commons:Category:Waterfalls of Connecticut
  Wikimedia
  - Wikimedia Commons:Category:Connecticut
    - commons:Category:Maps of Connecticut
  - Wikinews:Category:Connecticut
    - Wikinews:Portal:Connecticut
  - Wikipedia Category:Connecticut
    - Wikipedia Portal:Connecticut
    - Wikipedia:WikiProject Connecticut
      - Category:WikiProject Connecticut articles
      - Wikipedia:WikiProject Connecticut#Members
- Willimantic, Connecticut

== Z ==
- Zoos in Connecticut
  - commons:Category:Zoos in Connecticut

== See also ==
- Topic overview:
  - Connecticut
  - Outline of Connecticut
