= Outline of Connecticut =

U.S. State

The flag of Connecticut

The seal of Connecticut

The location of the state of Connecticut in the United States of America

The following outline is provided as an overview of and topical guide to the U.S. state of Connecticut:

Connecticut – state located in the New England region of the northeastern United States. Called the "Constitution State" or the "Nutmeg state", Connecticut has a long history dating from early colonial times and was influential in the development of the federal government. Connecticut enjoys a temperate climate due to its long coastline on Long Island Sound.

== General reference ==
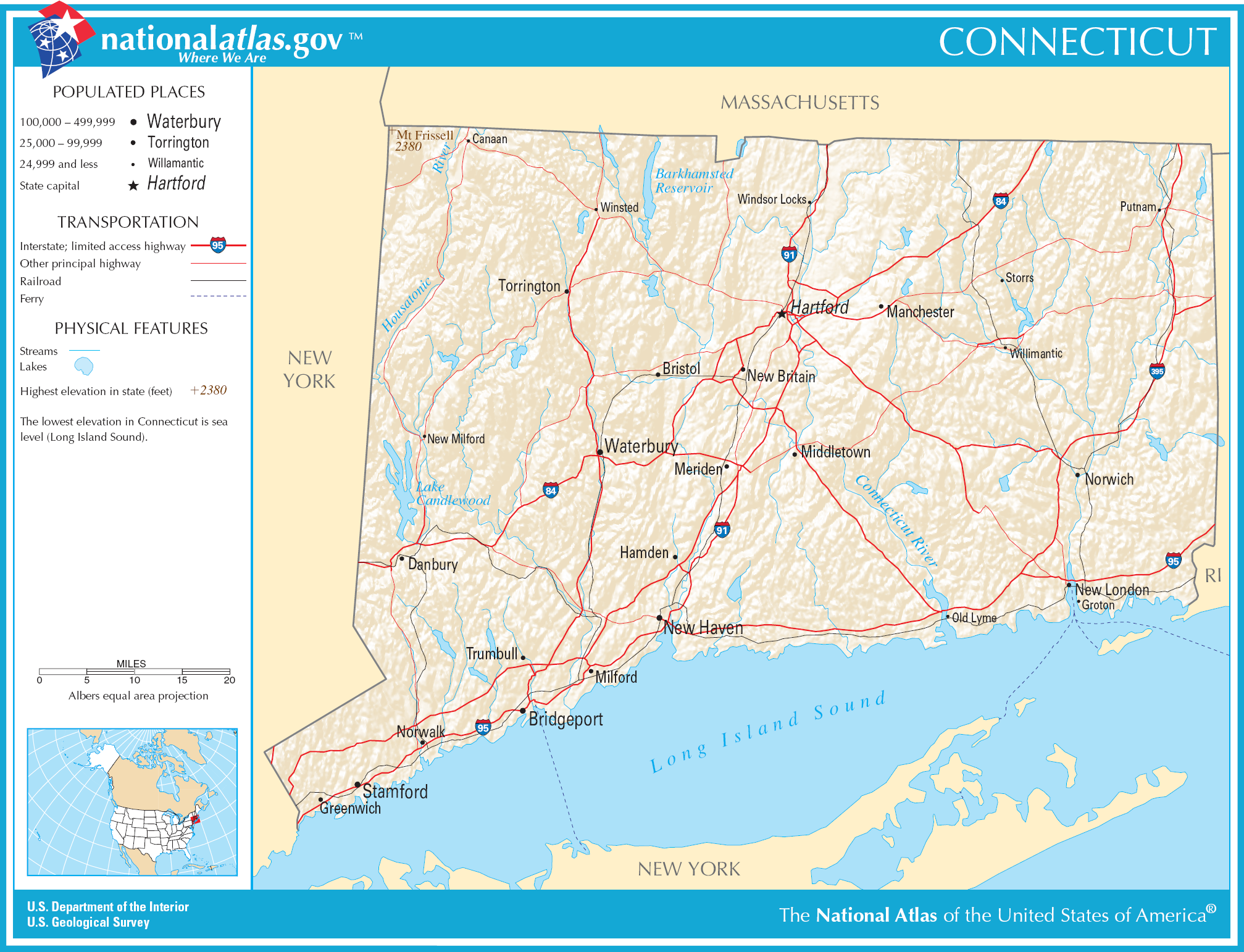
An enlargeable map of the state of Connecticut

- Names
  - Common name: Connecticut
    - Pronunciation: /kəˈnɛtɪkət/
  - Official name: State of Connecticut
  - Abbreviations and name codes
    - Postal symbol: CT
    - ISO 3166-2 code: US-CT
    - Internet second-level domain: .ct.us
  - Nicknames
    - Blue Law State
    - Brownstone State
    - Constitution State (currently used on license plates)
    - Freestone State
    - Land of Steady Habits
    - Nutmeg State
    - Provisions State
- Adjectival: Connecticut
- Demonyms:
  - Connecticuter
  - Nutmegger

== Geography of Connecticut ==
Geography of Connecticut

- Connecticut is: a U.S. state, a federal state of the United States of America
- Location
  - Northern Hemisphere
  - Western Hemisphere
    - Americas
      - North America
        - Anglo America
        - Northern America
          - United States of America
            - Contiguous United States
              - Eastern United States
                - East Coast of the United States
                  - Northeastern United States
                    - New England
                  - Northeast megalopolis
- Population of Connecticut: 3,574,097 (2010 U.S. Census)
- Area of Connecticut: 5,543 sq mi (14,356 km^{2})
- Atlas of Connecticut

=== Places in Connecticut ===
Places in Connecticut

- Historic places in Connecticut
  - National Historic Landmarks in Connecticut
  - National Register of Historic Places listings in Connecticut
    - Bridges on the National Register of Historic Places in Connecticut
- Protected areas of Connecticut
  - National Natural Landmarks in Connecticut
  - State parks in Connecticut
    - State forests in Connecticut
    - State park trails in Connecticut
  - Nature centers in Connecticut

=== Environment of Connecticut ===
- Climate of Connecticut
- Climate change
- Connecticut Department of Energy and Environmental Protection
- Geology of Connecticut
- Superfund sites in Connecticut
- Wildlife of Connecticut
  - Flora of Connecticut
  - Fauna of Connecticut
    - Birds of Connecticut
    - Mammals of Connecticut

==== Natural geographic features of Connecticut ====
- Islands of Connecticut
- Rivers of Connecticut

=== Regions of Connecticut ===
Regions of Connecticut

- Northern Connecticut
  - Northeastern Connecticut
  - Northwestern Connecticut
- Southern Connecticut
  - Southeastern Connecticut
  - Southwestern Connecticut

==== Administrative divisions of Connecticut ====
Local government in Connecticut

- Towns in Connecticut (New England town)
  - State capital of Connecticut: Hartford
  - City nicknames in Connecticut
  - Cities in Connecticut
  - Unincorporated communities in Connecticut
- Census-designated places in Connecticut

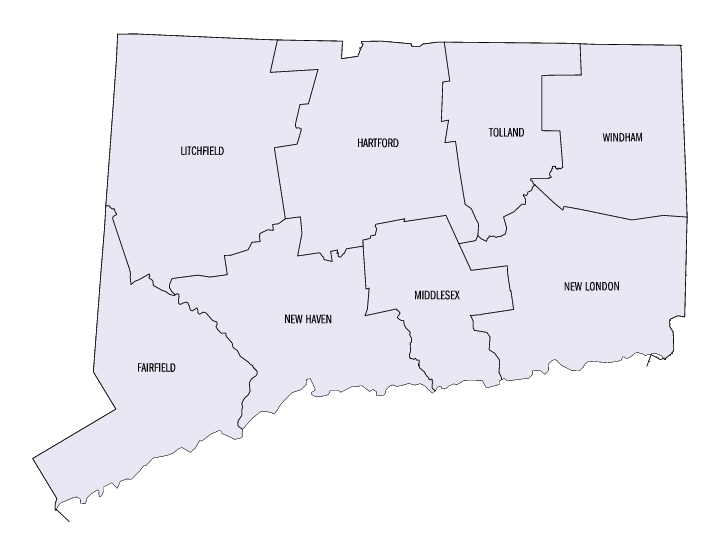
An enlargeable map of the 8 counties of the State of Connecticut

Historic counties of the state of Connecticut

1. Fairfield County
2. Hartford County
3. Litchfield County
4. Middlesex County
5. New Haven County
6. New London County
7. Tolland County
8. Windham County

=== Demography of Connecticut ===
Demographics of Connecticut

== Government and politics of Connecticut ==
Politics of Connecticut

- Form of government: U.S. state government
- Connecticut's congressional delegations
- Connecticut State Capitol
- Elections in Connecticut
- Political party strength in Connecticut

=== Branches of the government of Connecticut ===
Government of Connecticut

==== Executive branch of the government of Connecticut ====
- Governor of Connecticut
  - Lieutenant Governor of Connecticut
  - Secretary of State of Connecticut
- State departments
  - Connecticut Department of Transportation

==== Legislative branch of the government of Connecticut ====
- Connecticut General Assembly (bicameral)
  - Upper house: Connecticut Senate
  - Lower house: Connecticut House of Representatives

==== Judicial branch of the government of Connecticut ====
Courts of Connecticut

- Supreme Court of Connecticut

=== Law and order in Connecticut ===
Law of Connecticut

- Adoption in Connecticut
- Cannabis in Connecticut
- Capital punishment in Connecticut
  - Individuals executed in Connecticut
- Constitution of Connecticut
- Gun laws in Connecticut
- Law enforcement in Connecticut
  - Law enforcement agencies in Connecticut
    - Connecticut State Police
- Same-sex marriage in Connecticut

=== Military in Connecticut ===
Connecticut Military Department

- Connecticut Adjutant General
- Connecticut State Militia
  - Connecticut National Guard
    - Connecticut Air National Guard
      - 103d Airlift Wing
        - 118th Airlift Squadron
    - Connecticut Army National Guard
      - 102nd Infantry Regiment
      - 192nd Military Police Battalion
    - Connecticut Naval Militia
  - Governor's Guards
- Connecticut Department of Emergency Management and Homeland Security

Connecticut Wing Civil Air Patrol

National Reserves

- 304th Infantry Regiment (United States)

=== Local government in Connecticut ===
Local government in Connecticut

== History of Connecticut ==
History of Connecticut

=== History of Connecticut, by period ===
The location of the state of Connecticut

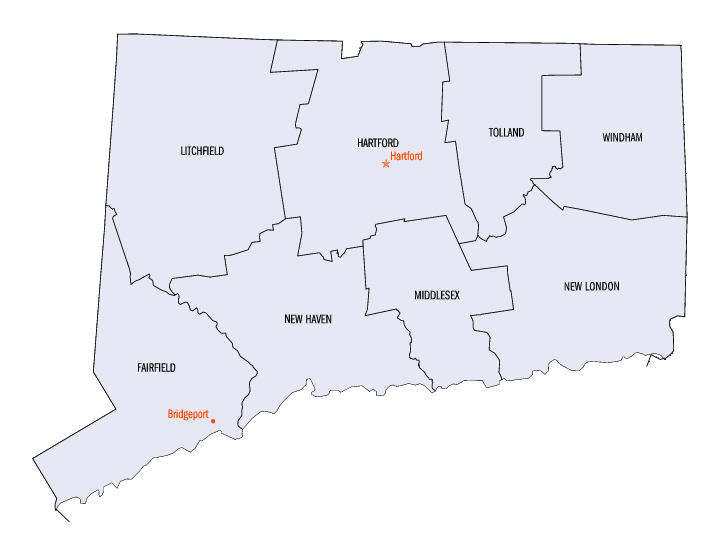
An enlargeable map of the eight counties of the state of Connecticut

- Indigenous peoples
- English Colony of Connecticut, 1636–1686
  - Pequot War, 1636–1637
  - Fundamental Orders of Connecticut, 1638
- English Colony of New-Haven, 1637–1662
- English Dominion of New-England in America, 1686–1689
- English Colony of Connecticut, 1689–1707
  - History of Connecticut industry
- British Colony of Connecticut, 1707–1776
  - King George's War, 1740–1748
    - Treaty of Aix-la-Chapelle of 1748
  - French and Indian War, 1754–1763
    - Treaty of Paris of 1763
  - Royal Proclamation of 1763
- American Revolutionary War, April 19, 1775 – September 3, 1783
  - United States Declaration of Independence, July 4, 1776
  - Treaty of Paris, September 3, 1783
  - State of Connecticut since 1776
    - Sixth state to ratify the Articles of Confederation and Perpetual Union, signed July 9, 1778
  - Far western territorial claims ceded 1786
  - Fifth state to ratify the Constitution of the United States of America on January 9, 1788
  - Connecticut Western Reserve ceded 1800
  - Mexican–American War, April 25, 1846 – February 2, 1848
  - American Civil War, April 12, 1861 – May 13, 1865
    - Connecticut in the American Civil War
  - George W. Bush becomes 43rd President of the United States on January 20, 2001

=== History of Connecticut, by region ===
- History of Bridgeport, Connecticut
- History of Brookfield, Connecticut
- History of Darien, Connecticut
- History of Greenwich, Connecticut
- History of Newtown, Connecticut
- History of Norwalk, Connecticut
- History of Stamford, Connecticut
- History of Trumbull, Connecticut
- History of West Haven, Connecticut
- History of Wilton, Connecticut

=== History of Connecticut, by subject ===
- History of the Connecticut Constitution
- History of Connecticut industry

== Culture of Connecticut ==
Culture of Connecticut

- Cuisine of Connecticut
- Museums in Connecticut
- Religion in Connecticut
  - Roman Catholic Archdiocese of Hartford
  - Roman Catholic Diocese of Norwich
  - The Church of Jesus Christ of Latter-day Saints in Connecticut
  - The First Cathedral
  - Episcopal Diocese of Connecticut
- Scouting in Connecticut
- State symbols of Connecticut
  - Flag of Connecticut
  - Great Seal of the State of Connecticut

=== The Arts in Connecticut ===
Music of Connecticut

=== Sports in Connecticut ===
Sports in Connecticut

== Economy and infrastructure of Connecticut ==
Economy of Connecticut

- Communications in Connecticut
  - Newspapers in Connecticut
  - Radio stations in Connecticut
  - Television stations in Connecticut
- Health care in Connecticut
  - Hospitals in Connecticut
  - Connecticut Medical Examining Board
  - Connecticut State Dental Commission
- Transportation in Connecticut
  - Airports in Connecticut
  - Roads in Connecticut
    - U.S. Highways in Connecticut
    - Interstate Highways in Connecticut

== Education in Connecticut ==
Education in Connecticut

- Schools in Connecticut
  - School districts in Connecticut
    - High schools in Connecticut
  - Colleges and universities in Connecticut
    - University of Connecticut
    - Yale University

== See also ==
- Topic overview:
  - Connecticut
  - Index of Connecticut-related articles
