= South Central Connecticut Planning Region, Connecticut =

South Central Regional Council of Governments (SCRCOG)
- Planning region
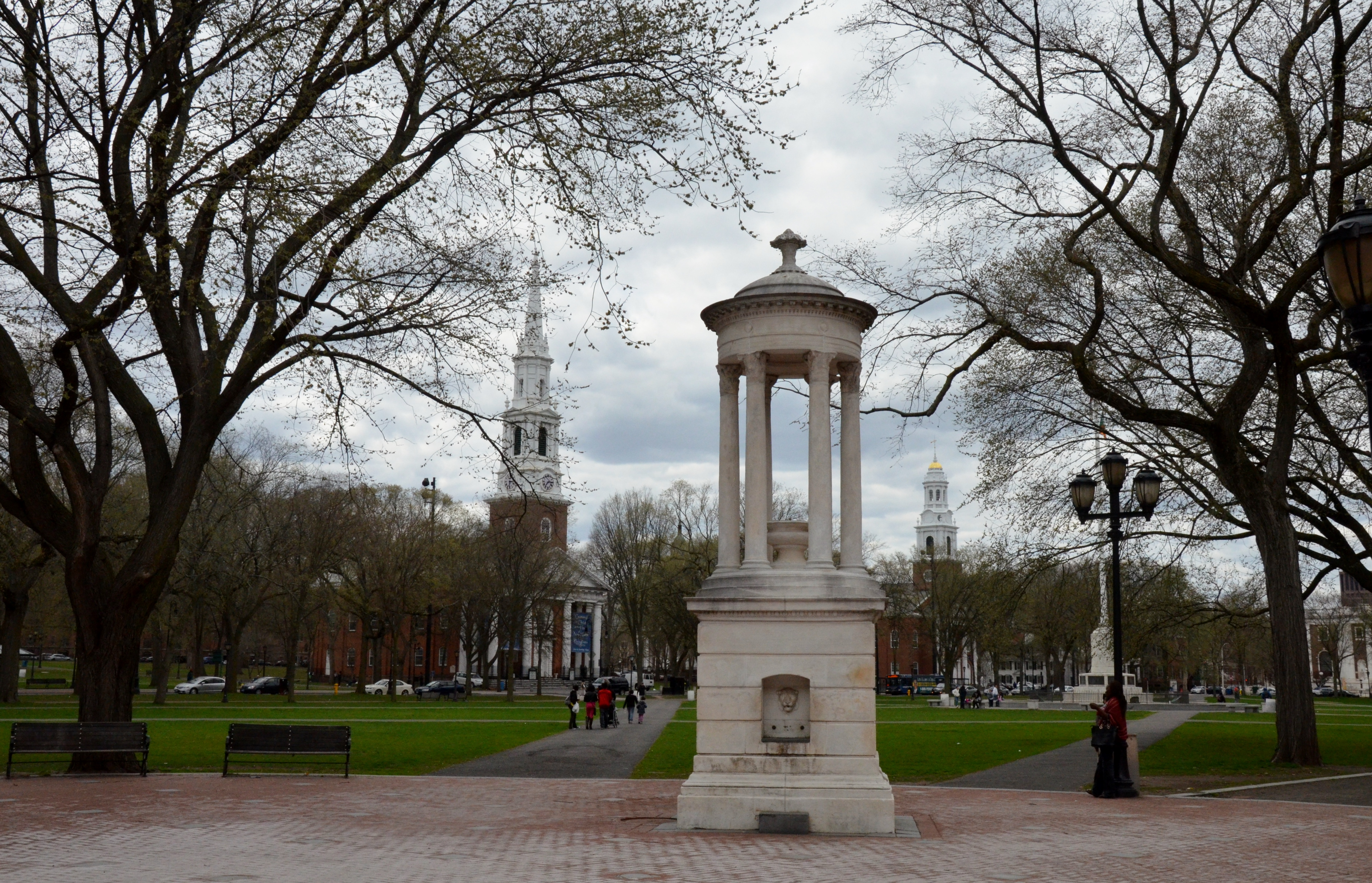
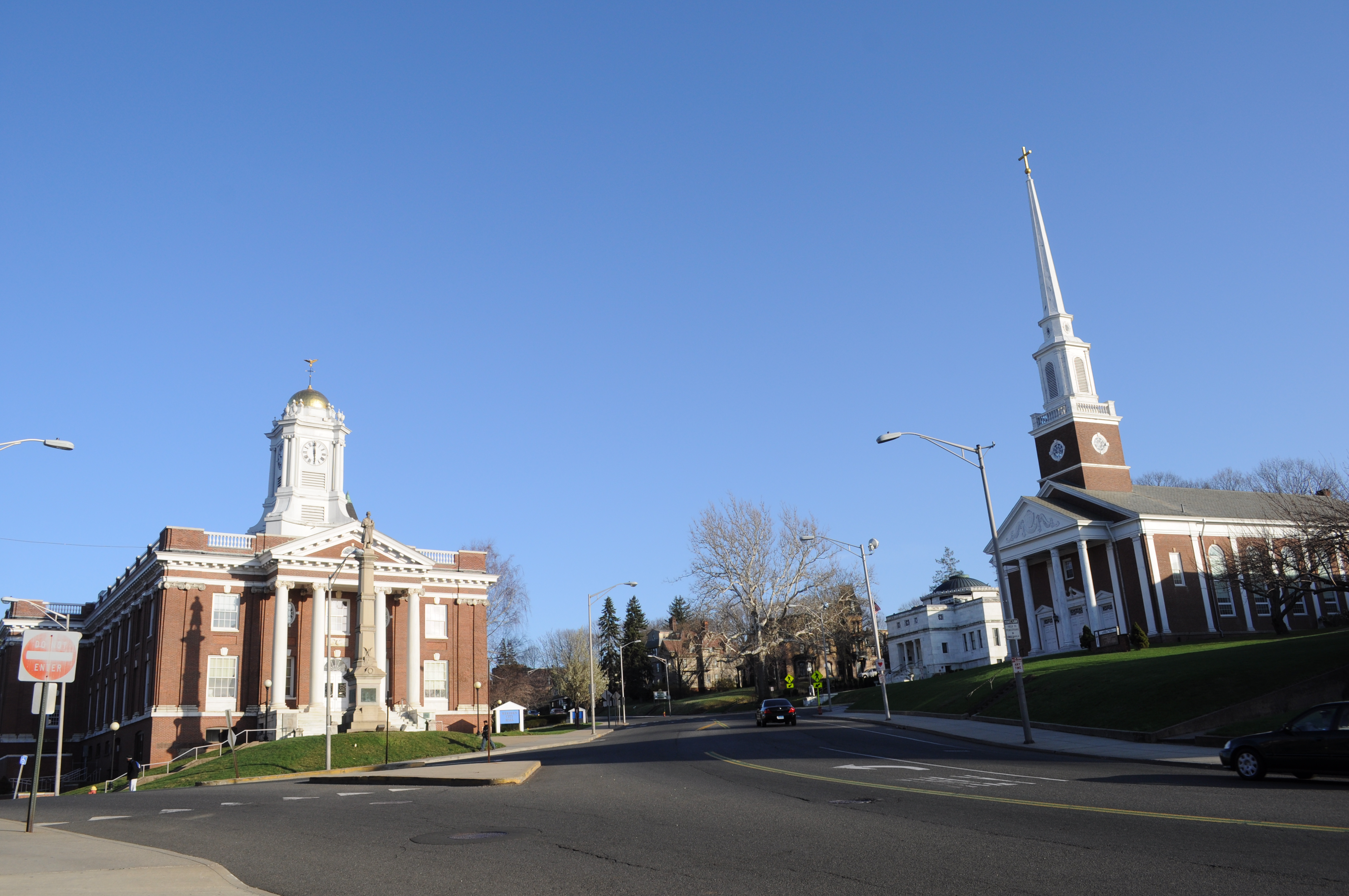
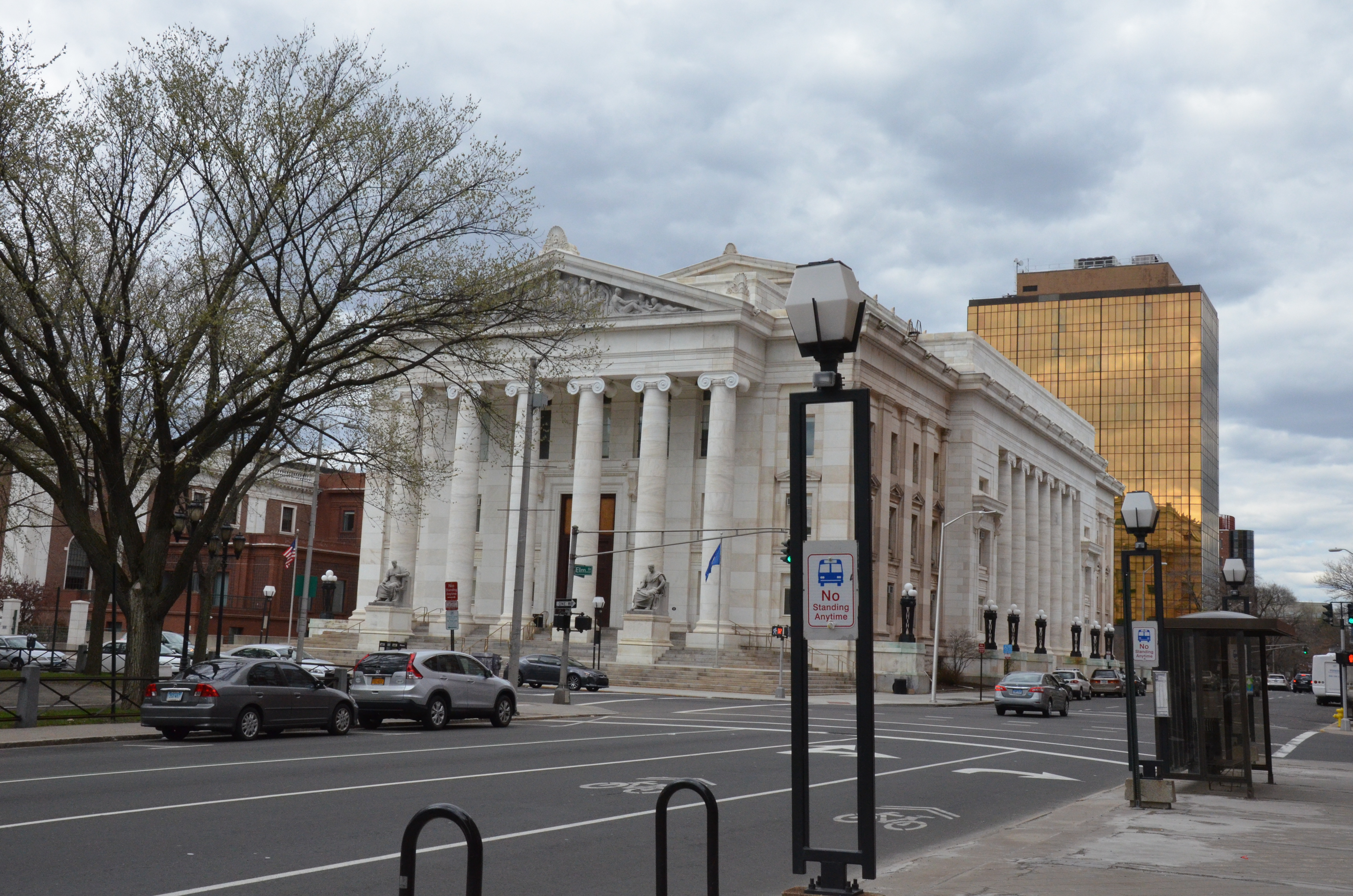
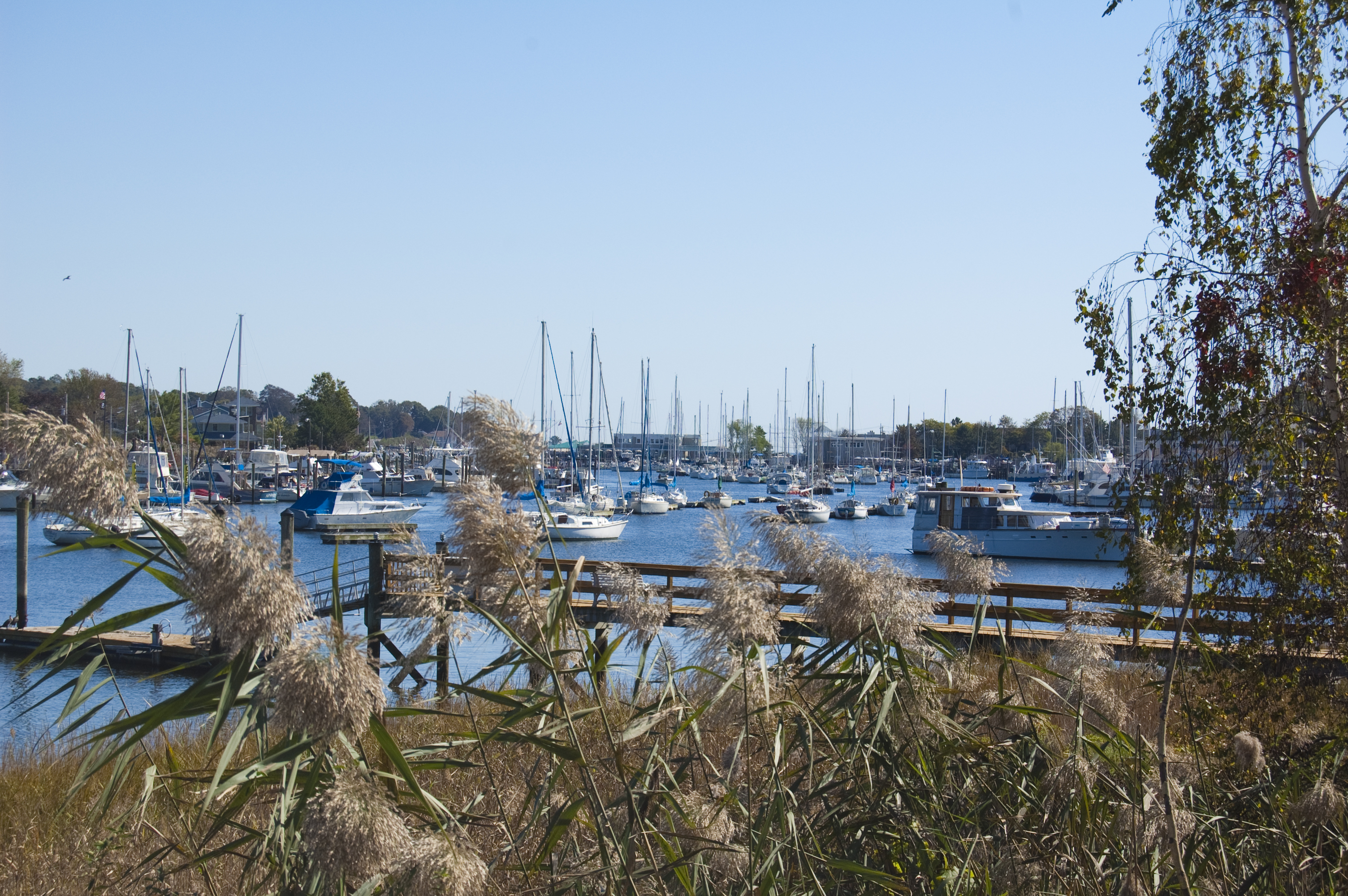
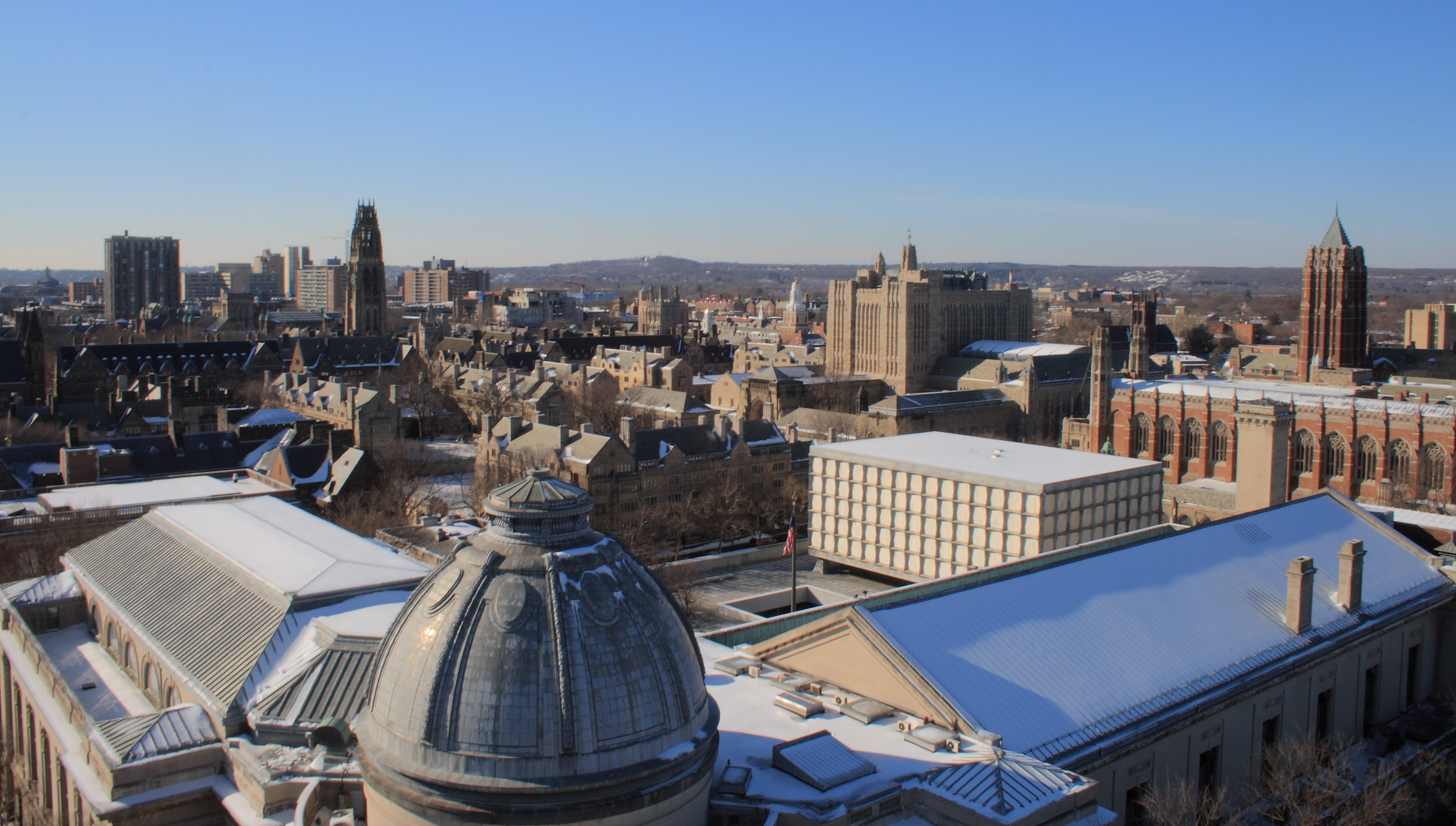
- From top left: New Haven Green, Main Street in Meriden, Downtown New Haven, Milford Harbor, Yale University campus

- Logo

- Location within the U.S. state of Connecticut
- Coordinates: 41°22′N 72°49′W
- Country: United States
- State: Connecticut
- Founded: 2013
- Largest city: New Haven
- Other cities: Meriden, West Haven, Milford

Government
  - Executive Director: Laura Francis

Area
  - Total: 367.2 sq mi (951 km^{2})

Population (2020)
  - Total: 570,487
  - Estimate (2025): 578,741 ▲
  - Density: 1,554/sq mi (599.9/km^{2})
- Time zone: UTC−5 (Eastern)
  - Summer (DST): UTC−4 (EDT)
- Congressional districts: 2nd, 3rd, 5th
- Website: scrcog.org

Interactive map of the South Central Connecticut Planning Region

The South Central Connecticut Planning Region is a planning region in the Councils of governments in Connecticut and a county-equivalent in the U.S. state of Connecticut. It is entirely within New Haven County. It is served by the coterminous South Central Regional Council of Governments (SCRCOG). In 2022, planning regions were approved to replace Connecticut's counties as county-equivalents for statistical purposes, with full implementation occurring by 2024. It is also coterminous with the New Haven metropolitan statistical area (MSA). According to the U.S. Census Bureau, the New Haven MSA had an estimated population of 576,718 as of 2024. The New Haven MSA is also included in the wider region known as the New York Tri-State Area.

Greater New Haven is the metropolitan area whose extent includes those towns in the U.S. state of Connecticut that share an economic, social, political, and historical focus on the city of New Haven. It occupies the south-central portion of the state, in a radius around New Haven. The region is known for its educational and economic connections to Yale University, oceanside recreation and the beach-community feel of the shoreline towns east of New Haven, and the trap rock landscapes stretching north from New Haven.

== Demographics ==
Historical population
Census	Pop.	Note	%±
1790	8,007		—
1800	7,948		−0.7%
1810	8,162		2.7%
1820	24,999		206.3%
1830	30,281		21.1%
1840	34,839		15.1%
1850	47,953		37.6%
1860	70,675		47.4%
1870	86,838		22.9%
1880	108,113		24.5%
1890	140,298		29.8%
1900	172,251		22.8%
1910	215,597		25.2%
1920	267,841		24.2%
1930	301,483		12.6%
1940	319,404		5.9%
1950	364,061		14.0%
1960	448,835		23.3%
1970	507,837		13.1%
1980	514,333		1.3%
1990	536,853		4.4%
2000	546,706		1.8%
2010	570,001		4.3%
2020	570,487		0.1%
2025 (est.)	578,741	▲	1.4%
U.S. Decennial Census

As of the 2020 United States census, there were 570,487 people living in the South Central Connecticut Planning Region.

== Municipalities ==
There are several official definitions of Greater New Haven. There are 13 municipalities that are included in all definitions. These are:

- Bethany
- Branford
- East Haven
- Guilford
- Hamden
- Madison
- New Haven (central city)
- North Branford
- North Haven
- Orange
- Wallingford
- West Haven
- Woodbridge

The following municipalities are members of the South Central Connecticut Region:

=== Cities ===
- Meriden
- Milford
- New Haven
- West Haven

=== Towns ===
- Bethany
- Branford
- East Haven
- Guilford
- Hamden
- Madison
- North Branford
- North Haven
- Orange
- Wallingford
- Woodbridge

=== New Haven Service Delivery Area ===
A service delivery area is a geographical area within which employment and training services are provided under the Job Training Partnership Act. This definition contains 14 towns and cities, with the town of Clinton added to the thirteen listed above.

=== South Central Planning Region ===
The South Central Connecticut Planning Region is an officially designated region of Connecticut administered by a regional council of governments. The regional council carries out land use, infrastructure, and long-term economic planning for the member towns. This definition contains 15 towns and includes the towns/cities of Meriden and Milford, in addition to those listed above.

=== New Haven Labor Market Area ===
A labor market area, as defined by the U.S. Bureau of Labor Statistics, is an economically integrated area within which individuals can reside and find employment within a reasonable distance or can readily change employment without changing their place of residence. This definition contains 17 towns including the towns of Cheshire, Clinton, Killingworth, and Meriden.

=== New England City and Town Area ===
The New Haven NECTA is the set of towns containing the contiguous urbanized area centered on the city of New Haven, plus additional outlying towns that have a sufficient number of people commuting into the central towns. This definition includes 23 towns, adding the following ten towns: Chester, Cheshire, Clinton, Deep River, Durham, Essex, Killingworth, Meriden, Middlefield, Old Saybrook, and Westbrook. As of the 2000 Census, the NECTA had a population of 571,310. NECTAs were discontinued in 2021.

=== Metropolitan Statistical Area ===
The New Haven, CT MSA is the contiguous urbanized area centered on the city of New Haven. The MSA is coterminous with the South Central Connecticut Planning Region. According to the U.S. Census Bureau, the New Haven, CT MSA had an estimated population of 576,718 as of 2024. The New Haven, CT MSA was included in the New York–Newark–Bridgeport Combined Statistical Area until 2023 when it was added to and became a major part of the New Haven–Hartford–Waterbury, CT CSA instead.

== Transportation ==
=== Rail ===
New Haven Union Station serves as the central point of rail service in Greater New Haven.

Metro North's New Haven Line serves New Haven State Street and New Haven Union Station in downtown New Haven, West Haven as well as Milford.

Shore Line East serves both New Haven stations plus Branford, Guilford, Madison, Clinton and Westbrook in the region, with service to Old Saybrook and New London as well as limited service to west of New Haven.

Both of Amtrak's Northeast Corridor services go through New Haven Union Station; most Acela Express and all Northeast Regional trains stop. Additionally, the Amtrak Hartford Line offers local service to Springfield, which is supplemented by the Hartford Line commuter service.

=== Bus ===
CTTransit serves the Greater New Haven area.

== See also ==
- Connecticut statistical areas
