= Gail Collins =

American journalist, columnist and author

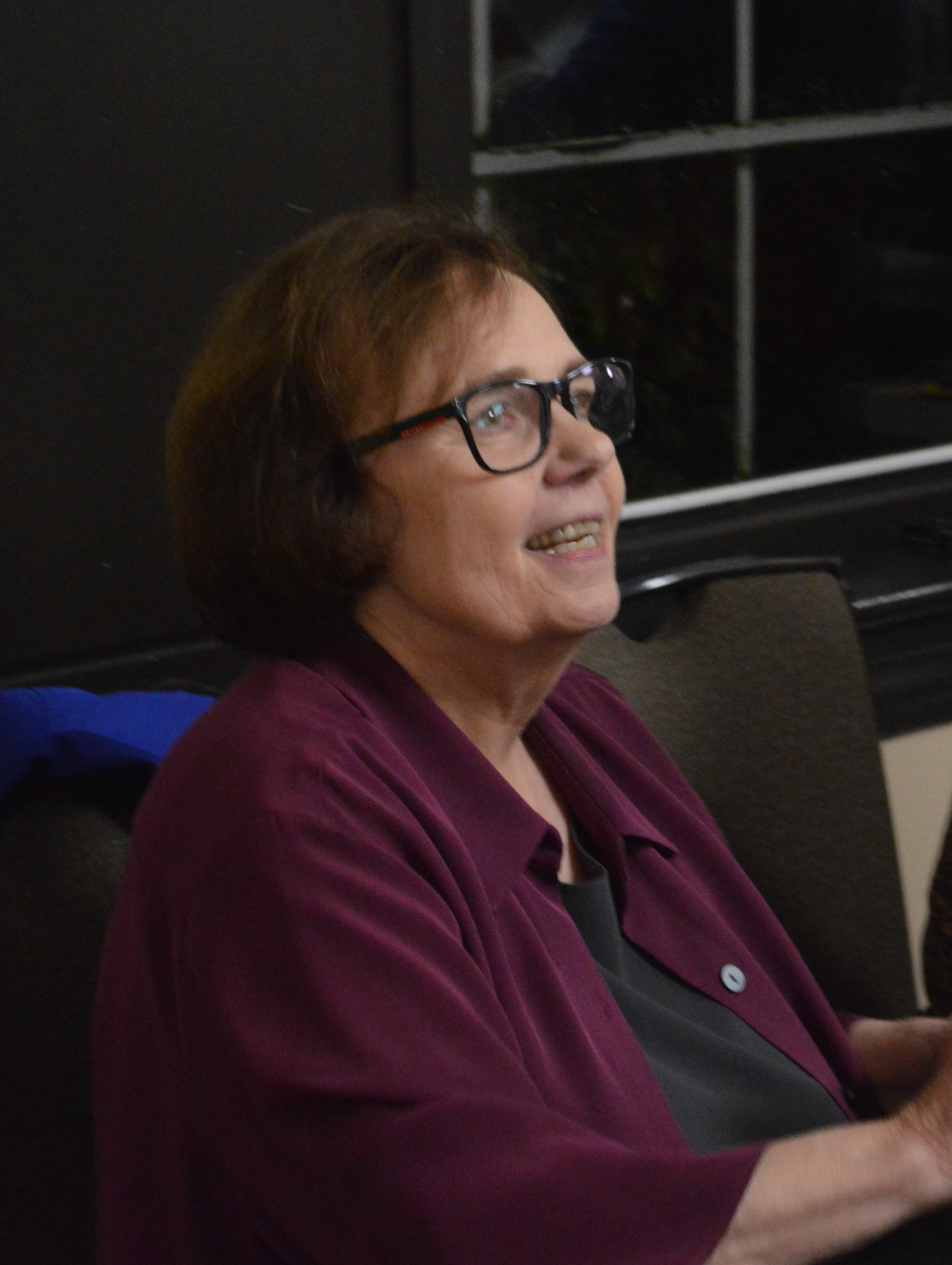
- Gail Collins at Rutgers University in 2019
- Born: Gail Gleason; November 25, 1945 (age 80); Cincinnati, Ohio, U.S.
- Education: Marquette University (B.A.); University of Massachusetts Amherst (M.A.)
- Occupations: Journalist, op-ed columnist
- Spouse: Dan Collins (m. 1970; died 2024)
- Writing career
- Notable works: As Texas Goes...: How the Lone Star State Hijacked the American Agenda; When Everything Changed: The Amazing Journey of American Women from 1960 to the Present
- Website: about.me/gailcollins

Gail Collins (born November 25, 1945) is an American journalist, op-ed columnist and author, most recognized for her work with The New York Times. Joining the Times in 1995 as a member of the editorial board, she served as the paper's Editorial Page Editor from 2001 to 2007 and was the first woman to attain that position.

During her tenure at the Times, Collins authored a weekly op-ed column from her liberal perspective. Starting in 2014, she also co-wrote a blog with the conservative columnist Bret Stephens called "The Conversation," featuring bi-partisan political commentary. In 2025, Collins stepped away from her role as a weekly columnist, though she continues to publish in the Times as a contributing writer.

== Biography ==
Born in Cincinnati in 1945 as Gail Gleason, Collins attended Seton High School before earning a B.A. in journalism at Marquette University in 1967 and an M.A. in government at the University of Massachusetts Amherst in 1971.

Following graduation from the University of Massachusetts at Amherst, she wrote for Connecticut publications, including the Hartford Advocate, and, in 1972, founded the Connecticut State News Bureau, a news service providing coverage of the state capital and Connecticut politics. When she sold the bureau in 1977, it had grown into the largest service of its kind in the United States. As a freelance writer in the late 1970s, she wrote weekly columns for the Connecticut Business Journal and was a public affairs host for Connecticut Public Television.

From 1982 to 1985 Collins covered finance as a reporter for United Press International. She wrote as a columnist for the New York Daily News from 1985 to 1991.

From 1991 to 1995, Collins worked for Newsday. She then joined The New York Times in 1995 as a member of the editorial board, and later as an op-ed columnist. In 2001, she was named the paper's first female Editorial Page Editor, a position she held for six years. She resigned from this post at the beginning of 2007 to take a six-month leave to focus on writing her book When Everything Changed: The Amazing Journey of American Women from 1960 to the Present, returning to the Times as a regular columnist in July 2007.

Beyond her work as a journalist, Collins has published several books: The Millennium Book, which she co-authored with her husband, CBS News producer Dan Collins; Scorpion Tongues: Gossip, Celebrity and American Politics; America's Women: Four Hundred Years of Dolls, Drudges, Helpmates, and Heroines; the aforementioned When Everything Changed; and As Texas Goes: How the Lone Star State Hijacked the American Agenda. She also wrote the introduction for the 2013 50th-anniversary edition of The Feminine Mystique by Betty Friedan. In 2019, her book No Stopping Us Now: The Adventures of Older Women in American History was published.

== Bibliography ==
External videos
- Booknotes interview with Collins on America's Women, December 14, 2003, C-SPAN
- Washington Journal interview with Collins on When Everything Changed, October 20, 2009, C-SPAN
- After Words interview with Collins on When Everything Changed, January 2, 2010, C-SPAN
- Discussion with Collins on As Texas Goes...', June 10, 2012, C-SPAN
- Interview with Collins on When Everything Changed, January 15, 2017, C-SPAN
- Interview with Collins on Now Stopping Us Now, September 26, 2020, C-SPAN

- With Dan Collins: The Millennium Book. Main Street Books. 1990. ISBN 0-385-41165-0.
- America's Women: 400 Years of Dolls, Drudges, Helpmates and Heroines. William Morrow and Company. 2003. ISBN 0-06-018510-4.
- Scorpion Tongues: Gossip, Celebrity and American Politics. William Morrow and Company. 1998. ISBN 0-688-14914-6.
- When Everything Changed: The Amazing Journey of American Women from 1960 to the Present. Little, Brown and Company. 2009. ISBN 978-0-316-05954-1.
- As Texas Goes...: How the Lone Star State Hijacked the American Agenda. New York: Liveright Publishing Corp., 2012. ISBN 978-0-87140-407-7
- William Henry Harrison: The American Presidents Series: The 9th President, 1841. New York: Times Books, 2012. ISBN 9780805091182
- "Introduction" (2013), in: Betty Friedan, The Feminine Mystique. 50th anniversary edition. New York: W.W. Norton. ISBN 978-0-393-063790.
- No Stopping Us Now: A History of Older Women in America. Little, Brown and Company, 2019 ISBN 9780316286541
