= Dan Collins (journalist) =

American journalist (1943–2024)

Daniel Joseph Collins (November 11, 1943 – July 9, 2024) was an American journalist and author. He was senior producer for CBS News.com. Collins was also a New York correspondent for U.S. News & World Report and a reporter for the New York Daily News.

== Background ==
Collins was born in Boston on November 11, 1943, and attended Northeastern University. He served in the U.S. Army.

== Career ==
Collins began his career with The New Haven Register in Connecticut, before moving to New York where he and his wife, the former Gail Gleason, both began working for United Press International. He then worked for U.S. News & World Report and CBS News.com.

He worked as the New York Editor for the Huffington Post. His work has appeared in The New York Times, the Los Angeles Times, the Village Voice, and many others. At CBS News, Collins was responsible for running the hard news operation at the website.

Collins was the author of several books, which included co-writing two critical biographies of New York City mayors: I, Koch: A Decidedly Unauthorized Biography of the Mayor of New York City, Edward I. Koch (1985), and Grand illusion: The Untold Story of Rudy Giuliani and 9/11 (2006).

== Personal life and death ==
Dan Collins was married to Gail Collins, a columnist at The New York Times, from 1970 until his death. He died of pneumonia and COVID-19 at a hospital in Manhattan, New York City, on July 9, 2024, at the age of 80.

== Selected bibliography ==
Collins was the author of several books including one with his wife and one with Wayne Barrett of the Village Voice. He co-authored the following books:

- Grand Illusion: The Untold Story of Rudy Giuliani and 9/11 (HarperCollins, 2006, ISBN 0-06-053660-8) [with Wayne Barrett]
- The Millennium Book - Your Essential All-Purpose Guide for the Year 2000 [with Gail Collins]
- I, Koch: A Decidedly Unauthorized Biography of the Mayor of New York City, Edward I. Koch
- "In the Name of the Law"

== Sources ==
- Harpercollins.com
