= Connecticut statistical areas =

Coordinates: 41.6219°N 72.7273°W

The U.S. State of Connecticut currently has nine statistical areas that have been delineated by the Office of Management and Budget (OMB). On July 21, 2023, the OMB delineated two combined statistical areas, five metropolitan statistical areas, and two micropolitan statistical areas in Connecticut. As of 2023, the largest of these in the state is the New Haven-Hartford-Waterbury, CT CSA, encompassing the entire state outside of the Bridgeport-Stamford-Danbury, CT MSA in the southwest.

== Statistical areas ==
The Office of Management and Budget (OMB) has designated more than 1,000 statistical areas for the United States and Puerto Rico. These statistical areas are important geographic delineations of population clusters used by the OMB, the United States Census Bureau, planning organizations, and federal, state, and local government entities.

The OMB defines a core-based statistical area (commonly referred to as a CBSA) as the county or counties (or county-equivalents) surrounding at least one densely-settled core of at least 10,000 population, "plus adjacent counties having a high degree of social and economic integration with the core as measured through commuting ties with the counties containing the core". The OMB further divides core-based statistical areas based on population into metropolitan statistical areas (MSAs) for those with at least 50,000 and micropolitan statistical areas (μSAs) for those with 10,000 to 49,999 people.

The OMB defines a combined statistical area (CSA) as two or more adjacent core-based statistical areas where the employment interchange rate (% commuting from A to B plus % commuting from B to A) is at least 15%. The primary statistical areas (PSAs) include all combined statistical areas and any core-based statistical area that is not a constituent of a combined statistical area.

The nine United States statistical areas and nine planning regions of the State of Connecticut (Note: An out-of-state area and its population are displayed in green. An area that extends into more than one state is displayed in purple. A purple population number over a black population number show the total population versus the in-state population. The state's abbreviation is also shown next to the in-state total.)
Combined statistical area	2025 population (est.)	Core-based statistical area	2025 population (est.)	County-equivalent	2025 population (est.)	Metropolitan division	2025 population (est.)
New Haven-Hartford-Waterbury, CT CSA	2,710,317	Hartford-West Hartford-East Hartford, CT MSA	1,171,426	Capitol Planning Region, Connecticut	994,115	none	
New Haven-Hartford-Waterbury, CT CSA	2,710,317	Hartford-West Hartford-East Hartford, CT MSA	1,171,426	Lower Connecticut River Valley Planning Region, Connecticut	177,311	none	
New Haven-Hartford-Waterbury, CT CSA	2,710,317	New Haven, CT MSA	578,741	South Central Connecticut Planning Region, Connecticut	578,741	none	
New Haven-Hartford-Waterbury, CT CSA	2,710,317	Waterbury-Shelton, CT MSA	463,349	Naugatuck Valley Planning Region, Connecticut	463,349	none	
New Haven-Hartford-Waterbury, CT CSA	2,710,317	Norwich-New London-Willimantic, CT MSA	284,015	Southeastern Connecticut Planning Region, Connecticut	284,015	none	
New Haven-Hartford-Waterbury, CT CSA	2,710,317	Torrington, CT μSA	114,690	Northwest Hills Planning Region, Connecticut	114,690	none	
New Haven-Hartford-Waterbury, CT CSA	2,710,317	Putnam, CT μSA	98,096	Northeastern Connecticut Planning Region, Connecticut	98,096	none	
New York-Newark, NY-NJ-CT-PA CSA	21,859,598; 978,179 (CT)	New York-Newark-Jersey City, NY-NJ MSA	19,498,249	Kings County, New York	2,653,963	New York-Jersey City-White Plains, NY-NJ MD	12,300,480
New York-Newark, NY-NJ-CT-PA CSA	21,859,598; 978,179 (CT)	New York-Newark-Jersey City, NY-NJ MSA	19,498,249	Queens County, New York	2,358,182	New York-Jersey City-White Plains, NY-NJ MD	12,300,480
New York-Newark, NY-NJ-CT-PA CSA	21,859,598; 978,179 (CT)	New York-Newark-Jersey City, NY-NJ MSA	19,498,249	New York County, New York	1,664,862	New York-Jersey City-White Plains, NY-NJ MD	12,300,480
New York-Newark, NY-NJ-CT-PA CSA	21,859,598; 978,179 (CT)	New York-Newark-Jersey City, NY-NJ MSA	19,498,249	Bronx County, New York	1,406,332	New York-Jersey City-White Plains, NY-NJ MD	12,300,480
New York-Newark, NY-NJ-CT-PA CSA	21,859,598; 978,179 (CT)	New York-Newark-Jersey City, NY-NJ MSA	19,498,249	Westchester County, New York	1,015,743	New York-Jersey City-White Plains, NY-NJ MD	12,300,480
New York-Newark, NY-NJ-CT-PA CSA	21,859,598; 978,179 (CT)	New York-Newark-Jersey City, NY-NJ MSA	19,498,249	Bergen County, New Jersey	977,026	New York-Jersey City-White Plains, NY-NJ MD	12,300,480
New York-Newark, NY-NJ-CT-PA CSA	21,859,598; 978,179 (CT)	New York-Newark-Jersey City, NY-NJ MSA	19,498,249	Hudson County, New Jersey	735,033	New York-Jersey City-White Plains, NY-NJ MD	12,300,480
New York-Newark, NY-NJ-CT-PA CSA	21,859,598; 978,179 (CT)	New York-Newark-Jersey City, NY-NJ MSA	19,498,249	Passaic County, New Jersey	531,624	New York-Jersey City-White Plains, NY-NJ MD	12,300,480
New York-Newark, NY-NJ-CT-PA CSA	21,859,598; 978,179 (CT)	New York-Newark-Jersey City, NY-NJ MSA	19,498,249	Richmond County, New York	501,290	New York-Jersey City-White Plains, NY-NJ MD	12,300,480
New York-Newark, NY-NJ-CT-PA CSA	21,859,598; 978,179 (CT)	New York-Newark-Jersey City, NY-NJ MSA	19,498,249	Rockland County, New York	357,397	New York-Jersey City-White Plains, NY-NJ MD	12,300,480
New York-Newark, NY-NJ-CT-PA CSA	21,859,598; 978,179 (CT)	New York-Newark-Jersey City, NY-NJ MSA	19,498,249	Putnam County, New York	99,028	New York-Jersey City-White Plains, NY-NJ MD	12,300,480
New York-Newark, NY-NJ-CT-PA CSA	21,859,598; 978,179 (CT)	New York-Newark-Jersey City, NY-NJ MSA	19,498,249	Suffolk County, New York	1,546,090	Nassau County-Suffolk County, NY MD	2,945,029
New York-Newark, NY-NJ-CT-PA CSA	21,859,598; 978,179 (CT)	New York-Newark-Jersey City, NY-NJ MSA	19,498,249	Nassau County, New York	1,398,939	Nassau County-Suffolk County, NY MD	2,945,029
New York-Newark, NY-NJ-CT-PA CSA	21,859,598; 978,179 (CT)	New York-Newark-Jersey City, NY-NJ MSA	19,498,249	Middlesex County, New Jersey	883,335	Lakewood-New Brunswick, NJ MD	2,564,602
New York-Newark, NY-NJ-CT-PA CSA	21,859,598; 978,179 (CT)	New York-Newark-Jersey City, NY-NJ MSA	19,498,249	Ocean County, New Jersey	673,746	Lakewood-New Brunswick, NJ MD	2,564,602
New York-Newark, NY-NJ-CT-PA CSA	21,859,598; 978,179 (CT)	New York-Newark-Jersey City, NY-NJ MSA	19,498,249	Monmouth County, New Jersey	651,035	Lakewood-New Brunswick, NJ MD	2,564,602
New York-Newark, NY-NJ-CT-PA CSA	21,859,598; 978,179 (CT)	New York-Newark-Jersey City, NY-NJ MSA	19,498,249	Somerset County, New Jersey	356,486	Lakewood-New Brunswick, NJ MD	2,564,602
New York-Newark, NY-NJ-CT-PA CSA	21,859,598; 978,179 (CT)	New York-Newark-Jersey City, NY-NJ MSA	19,498,249	Essex County, New Jersey	896,379	Newark, NJ MD	2,302,337
New York-Newark, NY-NJ-CT-PA CSA	21,859,598; 978,179 (CT)	New York-Newark-Jersey City, NY-NJ MSA	19,498,249	Union County, New Jersey	601,863	Newark, NJ MD	2,302,337
New York-Newark, NY-NJ-CT-PA CSA	21,859,598; 978,179 (CT)	New York-Newark-Jersey City, NY-NJ MSA	19,498,249	Morris County, New Jersey	524,251	Newark, NJ MD	2,302,337
New York-Newark, NY-NJ-CT-PA CSA	21,859,598; 978,179 (CT)	New York-Newark-Jersey City, NY-NJ MSA	19,498,249	Sussex County, New Jersey	148,063	Newark, NJ MD	2,302,337
New York-Newark, NY-NJ-CT-PA CSA	21,859,598; 978,179 (CT)	New York-Newark-Jersey City, NY-NJ MSA	19,498,249	Hunterdon County, New Jersey	131,781	Newark, NJ MD	2,302,337
New York-Newark, NY-NJ-CT-PA CSA	21,859,598; 978,179 (CT)	Bridgeport-Stamford-Danbury, CT MSA	978,179	Western Connecticut Planning Region, Connecticut	640,482	none	
New York-Newark, NY-NJ-CT-PA CSA	21,859,598; 978,179 (CT)	Bridgeport-Stamford-Danbury, CT MSA	978,179	Greater Bridgeport Planning Region, Connecticut	337,697	none	
New York-Newark, NY-NJ-CT-PA CSA	21,859,598; 978,179 (CT)	Kiryas Joel-Poughkeepsie-Newburgh, NY MSA	704,620	Orange County, New York	417,669	none	
New York-Newark, NY-NJ-CT-PA CSA	21,859,598; 978,179 (CT)	Kiryas Joel-Poughkeepsie-Newburgh, NY MSA	704,620	Dutchess County, New York	300,708	none	
New York-Newark, NY-NJ-CT-PA CSA	21,859,598; 978,179 (CT)	Trenton-Princeton, NJ MSA	399,289	Mercer County, New Jersey	399,289	none	
New York-Newark, NY-NJ-CT-PA CSA	21,859,598; 978,179 (CT)	Kingston, NY MSA	183,330	Ulster County, New York	183,330	none	
New York-Newark, NY-NJ-CT-PA CSA	21,859,598; 978,179 (CT)	Monticello, NY μSA	80,586	Sullivan County, New York	80,586	none	
New York-Newark, NY-NJ-CT-PA CSA	21,859,598; 978,179 (CT)	Hemlock Farms, PA μSA	62,808	Pike County, Pennsylvania	62,808	none	
State of Connecticut					3,688,496	none	

The 7 core-based statistical areas of the State of Connecticut
2025 rank	Core-based statistical area	Population				
2025 rank	Core-based statistical area	2025 estimate	Change	2020 Census	Change	2010 Census
1	Hartford-West Hartford-East Hartford, CT MSA	1,171,426	+3.00%	1,137,300	−1.07%	1,149,657
2	Bridgeport-Stamford-Danbury, CT MSA	978,179	+3.72%	943,100	+3.96%	907,159
3	New Haven, CT MSA	578,741	+2.53%	564,449	−0.97%	570,001
4	Waterbury-Shelton, CT MSA	463,349	+3.20%	448,993	+0.06%	448,738
5	Norwich-New London-Willimantic, CT MSA	284,015	+2.02%	278,383	−4.07%	290,198
6	Torrington, CT μSA	114,690	+2.21%	112,206	−8.75%	122,959
7	Putnam, CT μSA	98,096	+3.03%	95,212	−1.45%	96,617

The two combined statistical areas of the State of Connecticut (Note: For CSAs comprising populations from multiple states, they are listed twice to show both their intrastate population within that CSA as well as the CSA's total population. Only the intrastate population is ranked.)
2025 rank	Combined statistical area	Population				
2025 rank	Combined statistical area	2025 estimate	Change	2020 Census	Change	2010 Census
1	New Haven-Hartford-Waterbury, CT CSA	2,710,317	+2.80%	2,636,543	−1.55%	2,678,170
2	New York-Newark, NY-NJ-CT-PA CSA (CT)	978,179	+3.72%	943,100	+3.96%	907,159

== See also ==
- Geography of Connecticut
  - Demographics of Connecticut
