= Geography of Connecticut =

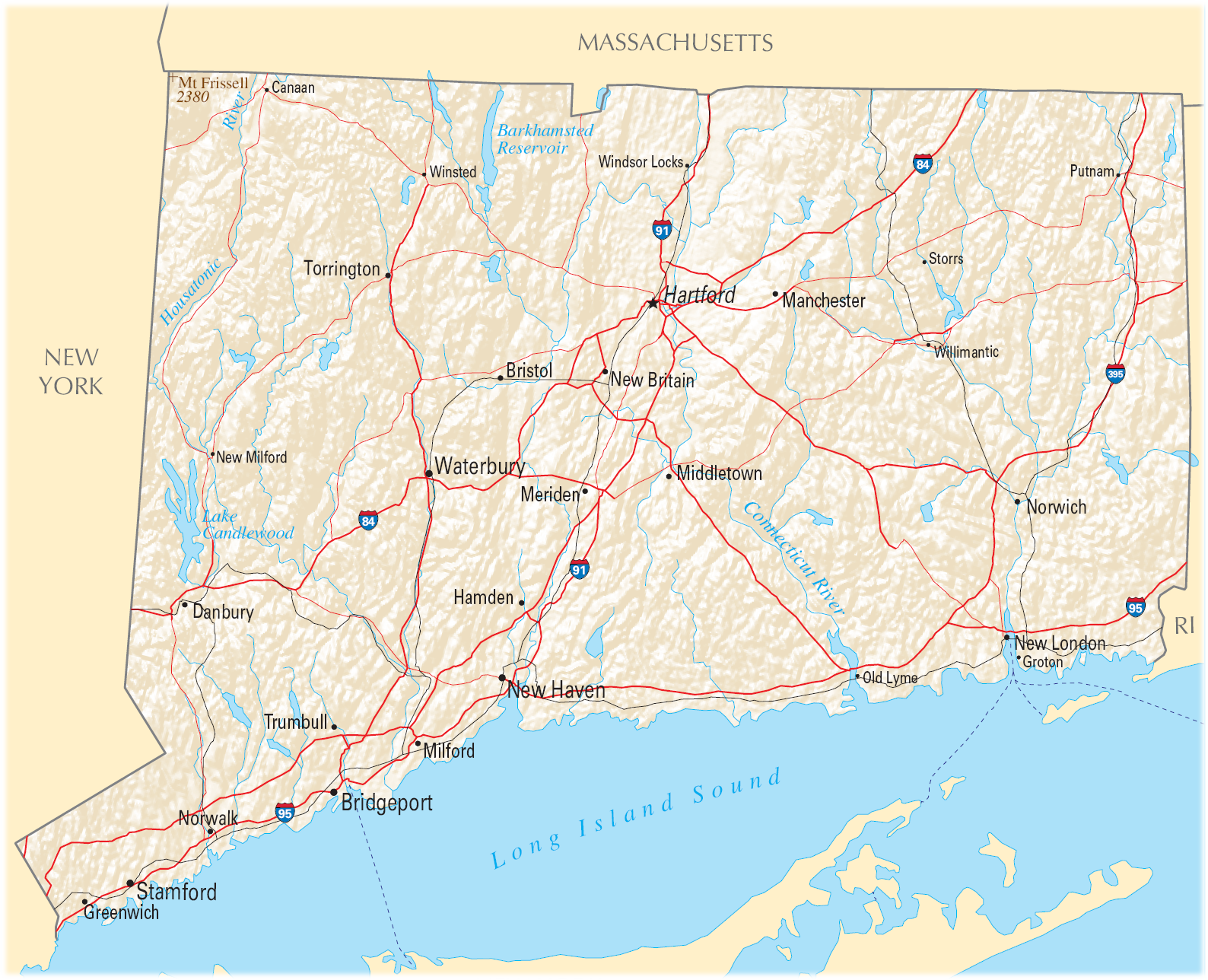
A map of Connecticut

The U.S. state of Connecticut is bordered on the south by Long Island Sound, on the west by New York, on the north by Massachusetts, and on the east by Rhode Island. The state capital and fourth largest city is Hartford, and other major cities and towns (by population) include Bridgeport, New Haven, Stamford, Waterbury, Norwalk, Danbury, New Britain, Greenwich, and Bristol. There are 169 incorporated towns in Connecticut, with cities and villages included within some towns.

== Overview ==
The highest peak in Connecticut is Bear Mountain in Salisbury in the northwest corner of the state. The highest point is just east of where Connecticut, Massachusetts, and New York meet (42°3′ N, 73°29′ W), on the southern slope of Mount Frissell, whose peak lies nearby in Massachusetts. At the opposite extreme, many of the coastal towns have areas that are less than 20 feet (6 m) above sea level.

Connecticut has a long maritime history and a reputation based on that history—yet the state has no direct oceanfront (technically speaking). The coast of Connecticut sits on Long Island Sound, which is an estuary. The state's access to the open Atlantic Ocean is both to the west (toward New York City) and to the east (toward the "race" near Rhode Island). Due to this unique geography, Long Island Sound and the Connecticut shoreline are relatively protected from high waves from storms.

The Connecticut River cuts through the center of the state, flowing into Long Island Sound. The most populous metropolitan region centered within the state lies in the Connecticut River Valley. Despite Connecticut's relatively small size, it features wide regional variations in its landscape; for example, in the northwestern Litchfield Hills, it features rolling mountains and horse farms, whereas in areas to the east of New Haven along the coast, the landscape features coastal marshes, beaches, and large scale maritime activities.

Connecticut's rural areas and small towns in the northeast and northwest corners of the state contrast sharply with its industrial cities such as Stamford, Bridgeport, and New Haven, located along the coastal highways from the New York border to New London, then northward up the Connecticut River to Hartford. Many towns in northeastern and northwestern Connecticut center around a green. Near the green typically stand historical visual symbols of New England towns, such as a white church, a colonial meeting house, a colonial tavern or inn, several colonial houses, and so on, establishing a scenic historical appearance maintained for both historic preservation and tourism. Many of the areas in southern and coastal Connecticut have been built up and rebuilt over the years, and look less visually like traditional New England.

The northern boundary of the state with Massachusetts is marked by the Southwick Jog or Granby Notch, an approximately 2.5 miles (4.0 km) square detour into Connecticut. The origin of this anomaly is clearly established in a long line of disputes and temporary agreements which were finally concluded in 1804, when southern Southwick's residents sought to leave Massachusetts, and the town was split in half.

The southwestern border of Connecticut where it abuts New York State is marked by a panhandle in Fairfield County, containing the towns of Greenwich, Stamford, New Canaan, Darien, and parts of Norwalk and Wilton. This irregularity in the boundary is the result of territorial disputes in the late 17th century, culminating with New York giving up its claim to the area, whose residents considered themselves part of Connecticut, in exchange for an equivalent area extending northwards from Ridgefield to the Massachusetts border, as well as undisputed claim to Rye, New York.

Areas maintained by the National Park Service include Appalachian National Scenic Trail, Quinebaug and Shetucket Rivers Valley National Heritage Corridor, and Weir Farm National Historic Site.

== Climate ==
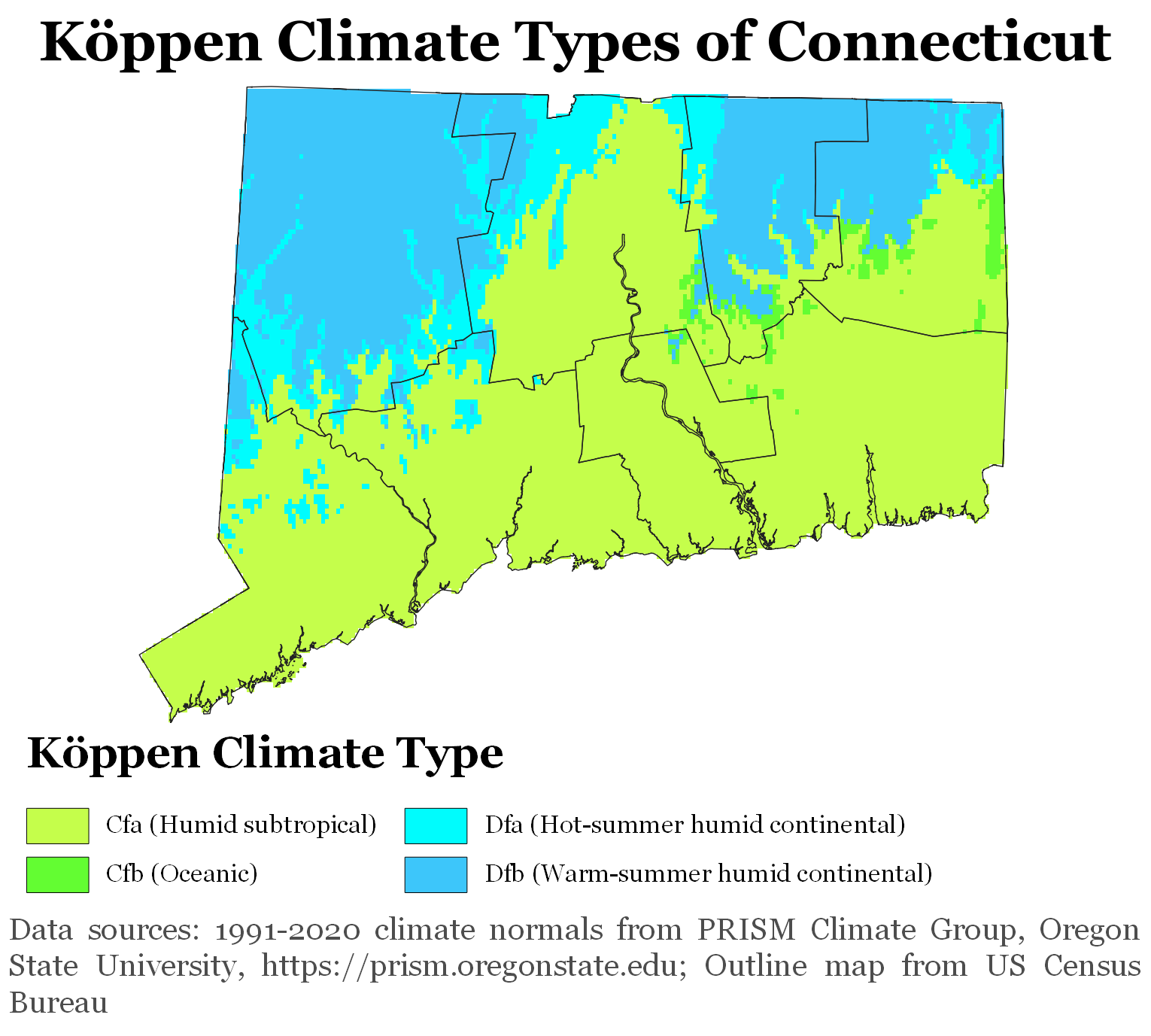
Köppen climate types of Connecticut, using 1991–2020 climate normals.

Connecticut lies at the rough transition zone between the southern end of the humid continental climate, and the northern portion of the humid subtropical climate. Northern Connecticut generally experiences a climate with cold winters with moderate snowfall and hot, humid summers. Far southern and coastal Connecticut has a climate with cool winters with a mix of rain and infrequent snow, and the long hot and humid summers typical of the middle and lower East Coast.

=== Precipitation ===
Connecticut sees a fairly even precipitation pattern with rainfall/snowfall spread throughout the 12 months. Connecticut averages 56% of possible sunshine (higher than the U.S. national average), averaging 2,400 hours of sunshine annually. On average, about one third of days in the state see some amount of precipitation each year. Occasionally, some months may see extremes in precipitation, either much higher or lower than normal. There have been several floods throughout Connecticut's history.

Early spring can range from slightly cool (40s to low 50s °F / 4.4 to 10 °C) to warm (18 to 21 °C, 65 to 70 °F), while mid and late spring (late April/May) is warm. By late May, the building Bermuda High creates a southerly flow of warm and humid tropical air, bringing hot weather conditions throughout the state. Average highs are 81 °F (27 °C) in New London and 85 °F (29 °C) in Windsor Locks at the peak of summer in late July. On occasion, heat waves with highs from 90 to 100 °F (32 to 38 °C) occur across Connecticut. Connecticut's record high temperature is 106 °F (41 °C) which occurred in Danbury on July 15, 1995. Although summers are sunny in Connecticut, quick moving summer thunderstorms can bring brief downpours with thunder and lightning. Occasionally these thunderstorms can be severe, and the state usually averages one tornado per year. During hurricane season, the remains of tropical cyclones occasionally affect the region, though a direct hit is rare. Some notable hurricanes to impact the state include the 1938 New England hurricane, Hurricane Carol in 1954, Hurricane Sandy in 2012, and Hurricane Isaias in 2020.

Weather commonly associated with the fall season typically begins in October and lasts to the first days of December. Daily high temperatures in October and November range from the 50s to 60s (Fahrenheit) with nights in the 40s and upper 30s. Colorful foliage begins across northern parts of the state in early October and moves south and east reaching southeast Connecticut by early November. Far southern and coastal areas, however, have more oak and hickory trees (and fewer maples) and are often less colorful than areas to the north. By December daytime highs are in the 40s °F for much of the state, and average overnight lows are below freezing.

Winters (December through mid-March) are generally cold from south to north in Connecticut. The coldest month (January) has average high temperatures ranging from 38 °F (3 °C) in the coastal lowlands to 33 °F (1 °C) in the inland and northern portions on the state. The lowest temperature recorded in Connecticut is −32 °F (−36 °C) which has been observed twice: in Falls Village on February 16, 1943, and in Coventry on January 22, 1961. The average yearly snowfall ranges from about 60 inches (1,500 mm) in the higher elevations of the northern portion of the state to only 20–25 inches (510–640 mm) along the southeast coast of Connecticut (Branford to Groton). Generally, any locale north or west of Interstate 84 receives the most snow, during a storm, and throughout the season. Most of Connecticut has less than 60 days of snow cover. Snow usually falls from late November to late March in the northern part of the state, and from early December to mid-March in the southern and coastal parts of the state. During winter, on occasion Connecticut is subject to snowstorms which can bring one to two feet of snow on rare occasion, or heavy rain and tidal flooding. At times there has been some damage along the coast. Ice storms also occur on occasion, such as the Southern New England ice storm of 1973 and the December 2008 Northeastern United States ice storm. These storms can cause widespread power outages and damage.

=== Climate data ===
Monthly normal high and low temperatures for various Connecticut cities (°F)
City	Jan	Feb	Mar	Apr	May	Jun	Jul	Aug	Sep	Oct	Nov	Dec
Bridgeport	38/24	40/25	47/32	58/41	68/51	77/61	83/67	81/67	75/59	64/48	53/38	43/30
Hartford	35/18	38/20	47/28	60/38	71/48	79/57	85/63	83/61	75/53	63/42	51/33	40/24

Climate data for Bradley International Airport, Connecticut (1991–2020 normals, (Note: Mean monthly maxima and minima (i.e. the expected highest and lowest temperature readings at any point during the year or given month) calculated based on data at said location from 1991 to 2020.) extremes 1905–present) (Note: Official records for Hartford kept at downtown from January 1905 to December 1948, Brainard Airport from January 1949 to December 1954, and at Bradley Int'l in Windsor Locks since January 1955.)
Month	Jan	Feb	Mar	Apr	May	Jun	Jul	Aug	Sep	Oct	Nov	Dec	Year
Record high °F (°C)	72 (22)	77 (25)	89 (32)	96 (36)	99 (37)	100 (38)	103 (39)	102 (39)	101 (38)	91 (33)	84 (29)	76 (24)	103 (39)
Mean maximum °F (°C)	57.0 (13.9)	57.7 (14.3)	68.2 (20.1)	82.3 (27.9)	90.4 (32.4)	93.2 (34.0)	95.9 (35.5)	94.2 (34.6)	89.6 (32.0)	80.2 (26.8)	70.6 (21.4)	60.1 (15.6)	97.7 (36.5)
Mean daily maximum °F (°C)	35.8 (2.1)	38.5 (3.6)	47.3 (8.5)	60.5 (15.8)	71.7 (22.1)	79.9 (26.6)	85.2 (29.6)	83.3 (28.5)	75.7 (24.3)	63.5 (17.5)	51.5 (10.8)	40.6 (4.8)	61.1 (16.2)
Daily mean °F (°C)	27.1 (−2.7)	29.6 (−1.3)	37.8 (3.2)	49.5 (9.7)	60.0 (15.6)	68.9 (20.5)	74.3 (23.5)	72.5 (22.5)	64.8 (18.2)	53.0 (11.7)	42.3 (5.7)	32.6 (0.3)	51.0 (10.6)
Mean daily minimum °F (°C)	18.8 (−7.3)	20.7 (−6.3)	28.2 (−2.1)	38.4 (3.6)	48.4 (9.1)	57.8 (14.3)	63.4 (17.4)	61.7 (16.5)	53.8 (12.1)	42.4 (5.8)	33.0 (0.6)	24.6 (−4.1)	40.9 (4.9)
Mean minimum °F (°C)	−0.9 (−18.3)	1.9 (−16.7)	11.4 (−11.4)	26.3 (−3.2)	34.7 (1.5)	44.9 (7.2)	53.0 (11.7)	50.1 (10.1)	38.5 (3.6)	27.7 (−2.4)	17.7 (−7.9)	7.7 (−13.5)	−3.4 (−19.7)
Record low °F (°C)	−26 (−32)	−24 (−31)	−6 (−21)	9 (−13)	28 (−2)	37 (3)	44 (7)	36 (2)	30 (−1)	17 (−8)	1 (−17)	−18 (−28)	−26 (−32)
Average precipitation inches (mm)	3.28 (83)	3.13 (80)	3.81 (97)	3.88 (99)	3.79 (96)	4.28 (109)	4.17 (106)	4.21 (107)	4.39 (112)	4.52 (115)	3.51 (89)	4.08 (104)	47.05 (1,195)
Average snowfall inches (cm)	14.2 (36)	14.8 (38)	9.4 (24)	1.1 (2.8)	0.0 (0.0)	0.0 (0.0)	0.0 (0.0)	0.0 (0.0)	0.0 (0.0)	0.7 (1.8)	1.4 (3.6)	10.1 (26)	51.7 (131)
Average precipitation days (≥ 0.01 in)	10.9	10.5	11.2	11.5	12.3	11.8	10.7	10.4	9.2	10.5	9.9	11.5	130.4
Average snowy days (≥ 0.1 in)	6.1	6.2	3.8	0.7	0.0	0.0	0.0	0.0	0.0	0.1	0.9	4.5	22.3
Average relative humidity (%)	63.9	63.0	60.4	58.0	63.0	67.3	68.0	70.6	72.9	69.2	68.3	68.0	66.1
Average dew point °F (°C)	13.6 (−10.2)	15.8 (−9.0)	23.4 (−4.8)	32.4 (0.2)	45.0 (7.2)	55.6 (13.1)	61.0 (16.1)	60.1 (15.6)	53.1 (11.7)	40.8 (4.9)	31.3 (−0.4)	19.8 (−6.8)	37.7 (3.1)
Mean monthly sunshine hours	169.8	176.1	213.9	228.2	258.6	273.4	293.1	269.6	223.6	199.4	139.4	139.5	2,584.6
Percentage possible sunshine	58	59	58	57	57	60	64	63	60	58	47	49	58
Average ultraviolet index	1	2	4	6	7	8	8	8	6	4	2	1	5
Source 1: NOAA (relative humidity, dew point, and sun 1961–1990)
Source 2: Weather Atlas (UV)

Climate data for Bridgeport, Connecticut (Sikorsky Airport), 1991–2020 normals, extremes 1948–present
Month	Jan	Feb	Mar	Apr	May	Jun	Jul	Aug	Sep	Oct	Nov	Dec	Year
Record high °F (°C)	69 (21)	67 (19)	84 (29)	91 (33)	97 (36)	97 (36)	103 (39)	100 (38)	99 (37)	89 (32)	78 (26)	76 (24)	103 (39)
Mean maximum °F (°C)	57 (14)	55 (13)	65 (18)	76 (24)	85 (29)	91 (33)	94 (34)	92 (33)	86 (30)	78 (26)	68 (20)	60 (16)	95 (35)
Mean daily maximum °F (°C)	38.4 (3.6)	40.5 (4.7)	47.4 (8.6)	58.3 (14.6)	68.4 (20.2)	77.7 (25.4)	83.4 (28.6)	81.9 (27.7)	75.4 (24.1)	64.4 (18.0)	53.6 (12.0)	43.8 (6.6)	61.1 (16.2)
Daily mean °F (°C)	31.4 (−0.3)	33.1 (0.6)	39.3 (4.1)	50.0 (10.0)	60.0 (15.6)	69.6 (20.9)	75.7 (24.3)	74.5 (23.6)	67.6 (19.8)	56.4 (13.6)	46.0 (7.8)	37.0 (2.8)	53.4 (11.9)
Mean daily minimum °F (°C)	24.4 (−4.2)	25.7 (−3.5)	32.3 (0.2)	41.7 (5.4)	51.7 (10.9)	61.5 (16.4)	67.9 (19.9)	67.0 (19.4)	59.8 (15.4)	48.3 (9.1)	38.4 (3.6)	30.2 (−1.0)	45.7 (7.6)
Mean minimum °F (°C)	7 (−14)	10 (−12)	18 (−8)	30 (−1)	41 (5)	50 (10)	59 (15)	57 (14)	46 (8)	34 (1)	24 (−4)	16 (−9)	5 (−15)
Record low °F (°C)	−7 (−22)	−6 (−21)	4 (−16)	18 (−8)	31 (−1)	41 (5)	49 (9)	44 (7)	36 (2)	26 (−3)	13 (−11)	−4 (−20)	−7 (−22)
Average precipitation inches (mm)	3.18 (81)	3.12 (79)	4.09 (104)	4.16 (106)	3.58 (91)	3.77 (96)	3.32 (84)	3.98 (101)	3.96 (101)	3.84 (98)	3.11 (79)	3.98 (101)	44.09 (1,121)
Average snowfall inches (cm)	8.5 (22)	10.7 (27)	7.0 (18)	0.9 (2.3)	0.0 (0.0)	0.0 (0.0)	0.0 (0.0)	0.0 (0.0)	0.0 (0.0)	0.1 (0.25)	0.9 (2.3)	5.5 (14)	33.6 (85)
Average precipitation days (≥ 0.01 in)	11.2	10.4	11.2	11.4	12.1	11.2	8.9	9.2	8.2	9.9	9.4	11.5	124.7
Average snowy days (≥ 0.1 in)	4.5	4.2	2.6	0.3	0.0	0.0	0.0	0.0	0.0	0.1	0.4	2.9	14.8
Source: NOAA

Climate data for New Haven (HVN), elevation: 4 m or 13 ft, 1991–2020 normals, extremes 1948–present
Month	Jan	Feb	Mar	Apr	May	Jun	Jul	Aug	Sep	Oct	Nov	Dec	Year
Record high °F (°C)	69 (21)	67 (19)	77 (25)	87 (31)	92 (33)	96 (36)	101 (38)	100 (38)	92 (33)	89 (32)	76 (24)	65 (18)	101 (38)
Mean maximum °F (°C)	56 (13)	55 (13)	64 (18)	77 (25)	83 (28)	88 (31)	91 (33)	90 (32)	86 (30)	78 (26)	68 (20)	59 (15)	92 (33)
Mean daily maximum °F (°C)	38.1 (3.4)	40.2 (4.6)	47.0 (8.3)	57.8 (14.3)	67.7 (19.8)	76.4 (24.7)	82.1 (27.8)	81.0 (27.2)	74.7 (23.7)	63.8 (17.7)	53.4 (11.9)	43.7 (6.5)	60.5 (15.8)
Daily mean °F (°C)	30.5 (−0.8)	32.0 (0.0)	38.5 (3.6)	48.5 (9.2)	58.5 (14.7)	67.9 (19.9)	73.9 (23.3)	72.9 (22.7)	66.0 (18.9)	54.7 (12.6)	44.7 (7.1)	36.3 (2.4)	52.0 (11.1)
Mean daily minimum °F (°C)	23.0 (−5.0)	23.9 (−4.5)	30.1 (−1.1)	39.3 (4.1)	49.4 (9.7)	59.3 (15.2)	65.7 (18.7)	64.7 (18.2)	57.3 (14.1)	45.5 (7.5)	35.9 (2.2)	28.9 (−1.7)	43.9 (6.6)
Mean minimum °F (°C)	5 (−15)	9 (−13)	16 (−9)	27 (−3)	38 (3)	48 (9)	57 (14)	54 (12)	45 (7)	31 (−1)	22 (−6)	15 (−9)	3 (−16)
Record low °F (°C)	−8 (−22)	−6 (−21)	1 (−17)	17 (−8)	30 (−1)	40 (4)	50 (10)	43 (6)	34 (1)	23 (−5)	13 (−11)	−3 (−19)	−8 (−22)
Average precipitation inches (mm)	2.72 (69)	2.84 (72)	3.66 (93)	4.19 (106)	3.54 (90)	3.47 (88)	3.36 (85)	3.55 (90)	4.03 (102)	3.78 (96)	3.12 (79)	3.53 (90)	41.79 (1,061)
Average precipitation days (≥ 0.01 in)	9.5	8.5	9.6	10.9	12.9	11.8	10.4	9.9	9.3	11.1	9.4	11.0	124.3
Average relative humidity (%)	62.8	60.3	64.4	65.1	69.7	73.8	74.2	73.8	74.1	70.4	68.2	63.6	68.4
Average ultraviolet index	2	2	4	6	7	8	8	8	6	4	2	1	5
Source 1: NOAA
Source 2: Weatherbase (humidity), Weather Atlas (UV index)

Climate data for Stamford (1991–2020 normals, extremes 1955–present)
Month	Jan	Feb	Mar	Apr	May	Jun	Jul	Aug	Sep	Oct	Nov	Dec	Year
Record high °F (°C)	69 (21)	74 (23)	85 (29)	96 (36)	97 (36)	97 (36)	102 (39)	104 (40)	97 (36)	91 (33)	82 (28)	76 (24)	104 (40)
Mean daily maximum °F (°C)	38.0 (3.3)	41.4 (5.2)	49.1 (9.5)	62.0 (16.7)	72.3 (22.4)	79.8 (26.6)	84.8 (29.3)	82.9 (28.3)	75.7 (24.3)	64.4 (18.0)	53.1 (11.7)	42.7 (5.9)	62.2 (16.8)
Daily mean °F (°C)	30.1 (−1.1)	32.2 (0.1)	39.8 (4.3)	51.1 (10.6)	61.1 (16.2)	69.2 (20.7)	74.6 (23.7)	73.0 (22.8)	66.0 (18.9)	54.5 (12.5)	44.1 (6.7)	35.0 (1.7)	52.6 (11.4)
Mean daily minimum °F (°C)	22.2 (−5.4)	23.1 (−4.9)	30.4 (−0.9)	40.3 (4.6)	50.0 (10.0)	58.5 (14.7)	64.4 (18.0)	63.1 (17.3)	56.2 (13.4)	44.6 (7.0)	35.1 (1.7)	27.3 (−2.6)	42.9 (6.1)
Record low °F (°C)	−18 (−28)	−15 (−26)	−6 (−21)	16 (−9)	28 (−2)	35 (2)	43 (6)	37 (3)	28 (−2)	16 (−9)	7 (−14)	−13 (−25)	−18 (−28)
Average precipitation inches (mm)	4.26 (108)	3.14 (80)	4.73 (120)	4.44 (113)	4.12 (105)	4.91 (125)	3.77 (96)	3.81 (97)	5.21 (132)	4.59 (117)	4.19 (106)	4.44 (113)	51.61 (1,311)
Average snowfall inches (cm)	9.1 (23)	11.9 (30)	5.9 (15)	0.5 (1.3)	0.0 (0.0)	0.0 (0.0)	0.0 (0.0)	0.0 (0.0)	0.0 (0.0)	0.0 (0.0)	0.8 (2.0)	5.8 (15)	34.0 (86)
Average precipitation days (≥ 0.01 in)	11.0	8.3	10.1	12.0	12.4	11.6	9.2	8.7	9.1	9.9	10.2	11.4	123.9
Average snowy days (≥ 0.1 in)	4.8	4.0	3.0	0.3	0.0	0.0	0.0	0.0	0.0	0.0	0.4	2.6	15.1
Source 1: NOAA
Source 2: Weather Channel

== Wildlife ==
=== Flora ===
Forests consist of a mix of Northeastern coastal forests of Oak in southern areas of the state, to the upland New England-Acadian forests in the northwestern parts of the state. Mountain Laurel (Kalmia latifolia) is the state flower and is native to low ridges in several parts of Connecticut. Rosebay Rhododendron (Rhododendron maximum) is also native to eastern uplands of Connecticut and Pachaug State Forest is home to the Rhododendron Sanctuary Trail. Atlantic white cedar (Chamaecyparis thyoides), is found in wetlands in the southern parts of the state. Connecticut has one native cactus (Opuntia humifusa), found in sandy coastal areas and low hillsides. Several types of beach grasses and wildflowers are also native to Connecticut. Connecticut spans USDA Plant Hardiness Zones 5b to 7a. Coastal Connecticut is the broad transition zone where more southern and subtropical plants are cultivated. In some coastal communities, Magnolia grandiflora (southern magnolia), Crape Myrtles, scrub palms (Sabal minor), needle palms (Rhapidophyllum hystrix), and other broadleaved evergreens are cultivated in small numbers.

== Largest cities and towns ==
Largest cities or towns in Connecticut
Rank	Name	County	Pop.
1	Bridgeport	Fairfield	148,654
2	Stamford	Fairfield	135,470
3	New Haven	New Haven	134,023
4	Hartford	Hartford	121,054
5	Waterbury	New Haven	114,403
6	Norwalk	Fairfield	91,184
7	Danbury	Fairfield	86,518
8	New Britain	Hartford	74,135
9	West Hartford	Hartford	64,083
10	Greenwich	Fairfield	63,518

== See also ==
- Geology of New England
- Geography of New York City
- Geography of New York (state)
- List of Connecticut tree species
