= History of Brookfield, Connecticut =

The History of Brookfield, Connecticut extends back roughly three centuries.

Historical population
Census	Pop.	Note	%±
1790	1,018		—
1800	1,010		−0.8%
1810	1,037		2.7%
1820	1,159		11.8%
1830	1,255		8.3%
1840	1,255		0.0%
1850	1,359		8.3%
1860	1,224		−9.9%
1870	1,923		57.1%
1880	1,152		−40.1%
1890	989		−14.1%
1900	1,046		5.8%
1910	1,101		5.3%
1920	896		−18.6%
1930	926		3.3%
1940	1,345		45.2%
1950	1,688		25.5%
1960	3,405		101.7%
1970	9,688		184.5%
1980	12,872		32.9%
1990	14,113		9.6%
2000	15,664		11.0%
2010	16,452		5.0%
2020	17,528		6.5%
Sources: 1790-1820; 1830-1890; 1900-1960; 1970-2010

== To 1800 ==
Before the English settled the area that became Brookfield, Connecticut, it was inhabited by the Wyantenuck and Paugusset Native Americans, both Algonquian peoples. According to early deeds for property on both sides of the Still River, Sachem Pokono (also Pocono), the son of Sachem Waramaug who met the first settlers to Brookfield in 1710, led the local Indians for many years. Indigenous artifacts are still found in Brookfield.

At one time, the "Indian Tree", a wild cherry tree on Route 133 was said to be the spot where local Native peoples met. Area names that come from the local Indigenous peoples include Lake Waramaug (for a chief or sachem in Algonquin ). Lillinonah was the name of his daughter. Pocono Road was named for Chief Pocono.

In the 18th century the community was called "Newbury," a name that came from the three towns from which its land was taken – New Milford, Newtown, and Danbury.

Because it was difficult for community residents to get to one of the distant churches in those towns in winter, in 1752 the General Assembly gave the community the right to have worship in area homes from September through March. In 1754, the General Assembly granted permission for the Parish of Newbury to build its own meeting house and get its own minister. On September 28, 1757, the first Congregational Church building was dedicated. The Reverend Thomas Brooks was ordained as the first settled minister. In 1787, when the town was incorporated, it changed its name to Brookfield in honor of Brooks, who was still the minister.

Along the Still River mills were in operation as early as 1732 in an area that became known as the Iron Works District. Brookfield was a thriving town with iron furnaces, grist mills, sawmills, comb shops, carding and cotton mills, a paper mill, a knife factory, hat factories, stage-coach shops, lime kilns, harness shops and other plants operated there. The grist mill (now the Brookfield Craft Center) still stands. The Iron Works Aqueduct Company, formed in 1837 to supply water from mountain springs to the Iron Works District, still supplies water as the Brookfield Water Company.

Masonic Federal Lodge #41 was established in Brookfield on November 7, 1797.

== Nineteenth and twentieth centuries ==
Town resident Susan Sherman wrote a diary in 1850–1851 now available online at a Web site of the University of Pennsylvania. The diary mentions frequent trips to Hartford, Danbury, and New Haven; embroidering and quilting; her own engagement and a description of her wedding. One section has recipes (mostly desserts).

Before 1912 the town had two train stations: one in the Iron Works District, near the present Brookfield Market and, second, Brookfield Junction station, near the corner of Junction Road and Stony Hill Road. Young people used the train to attend high school in Danbury.

The first Town Hall (first called the "Town House" was built in 1794 across from the meetinghouse (Congregational Church). Town business was conducted there until a new Town Hall was built in 1876 at a cost of $4,000. In 1975 the Town Hall was again moved to new quarters and the Brookfield Museum and Historical Society leased the structure.

Danbury & Bethel Gas and Electric Company brought electricity to Brookfield in 1915.

After Candlewood Lake was created, parts of the town of New Fairfield were left on the Brookfield side of the lake. So in 1961 Candlewood Shores, Hickory Hills, Candlewood Orchards, Arrowhead Point and the land that became Brookfield Town Park all became a part of Brookfield.

In 1955, the 14-mile-long (23 km) Lake Lillinonah was created when the Shepaug Dam was built.

The .475 Wildey Magnum gun, later made famous in the 1985 Charles Bronson movie Death Wish 3, was developed by Wildey J. Moore in Brookfield in the early 1970s (the factory has since moved to Warren, Connecticut).

In the early 1970s, the town was home to LEGO USA headquarters.

By the late 20th century, New Yorkers began relocating from the city to the suburbs. This created rapid real estate development in Brookfield, and turned Brookfield into a popular commuter town for those who work in New York City. The construction of Interstate 684, which created a direct highway link to New York City from Brookfield, also contributed significantly to the town's population growth.

In 1991 most buildings in Brookfield Center's Historic District were named to the National Register of Historic Places.

== Brookfield schools ==
The original Center School building was erected in 1762 and later served as the Town Hall. (Now it is rented by the Housatonic Valley Council of Elected Officials.) In 1788 the town of Brookfield was incorporated and by 1807 had eight school districts; Brookfield Center, Iron Works, Longmeadow, Whisconier, Obtuse, Bound Swamp, North Mountain, and South Mountain (Huckleberry Hill). In the 19th century, the town also had a private school for boys, as well as an internationally acclaimed music school.

When Mary Northrop died on June 29, 1794, she left her entire estate to the town on condition it be used for public education with interest on the estate to be paid out each year to support education. Her will, dated April 13, 1793, stated: "I give and bequeath unto the Town of Brookfield all my monies, Notes, or Bonds or Book Debts or Lands or Chattels or any interest that shall be found belonging to me after my decease, for use of a school, to be kept in the center of town [...] the interest of the money to be paid yearly for the support of the school after a reasonable time to settle the estate in." She apparently could not read herself and signed the will with an "X", her mark.

The town received 138 pounds, 11 shillings and nine pence from the estate in 1794. Northrop was called "Molly", and the fund became known by 1804 as the "Molly Fund", a name that has stuck to this day. Since Northrop's will stated the money should be used in the center of town, the fund was used to pay the singing master in the town's Sing School, which was located there.

The Long Meadow Hill School was built in 1959 and later became Brookfield High School, which graduated its first class in 1967.

== Books about the history of Brookfield ==
- Whittlesey, Marilyn, Images of America, Brookfield a collection of images of Brookfield, 128 pages, Arcadia Publishing (1999), ISBN 0-7385-0116-6 ISBN 978-0738501161
- Whittlesey, Marilyn, A look back: Brookfield, Connecticut Published by the Heritage Committee of the Brookfield, Connecticut Bicentennial Taskforce (1988) ASIN B00072DZLW
- Hawley, Emily Carrie, Annals of Brookfield, Fairfield County, Connecticut, 656 pages, Published by E.C. Hawley (1929) ASIN B0008CB93M;
  - republished by Higginson Book Company (1993) ASIN B0006RSF1I
  - republished in a CD-ROM version: by Heritage Books in 2005, 713 pages, ISBN 0-7884-2973-6
