= List of Connecticut area codes =

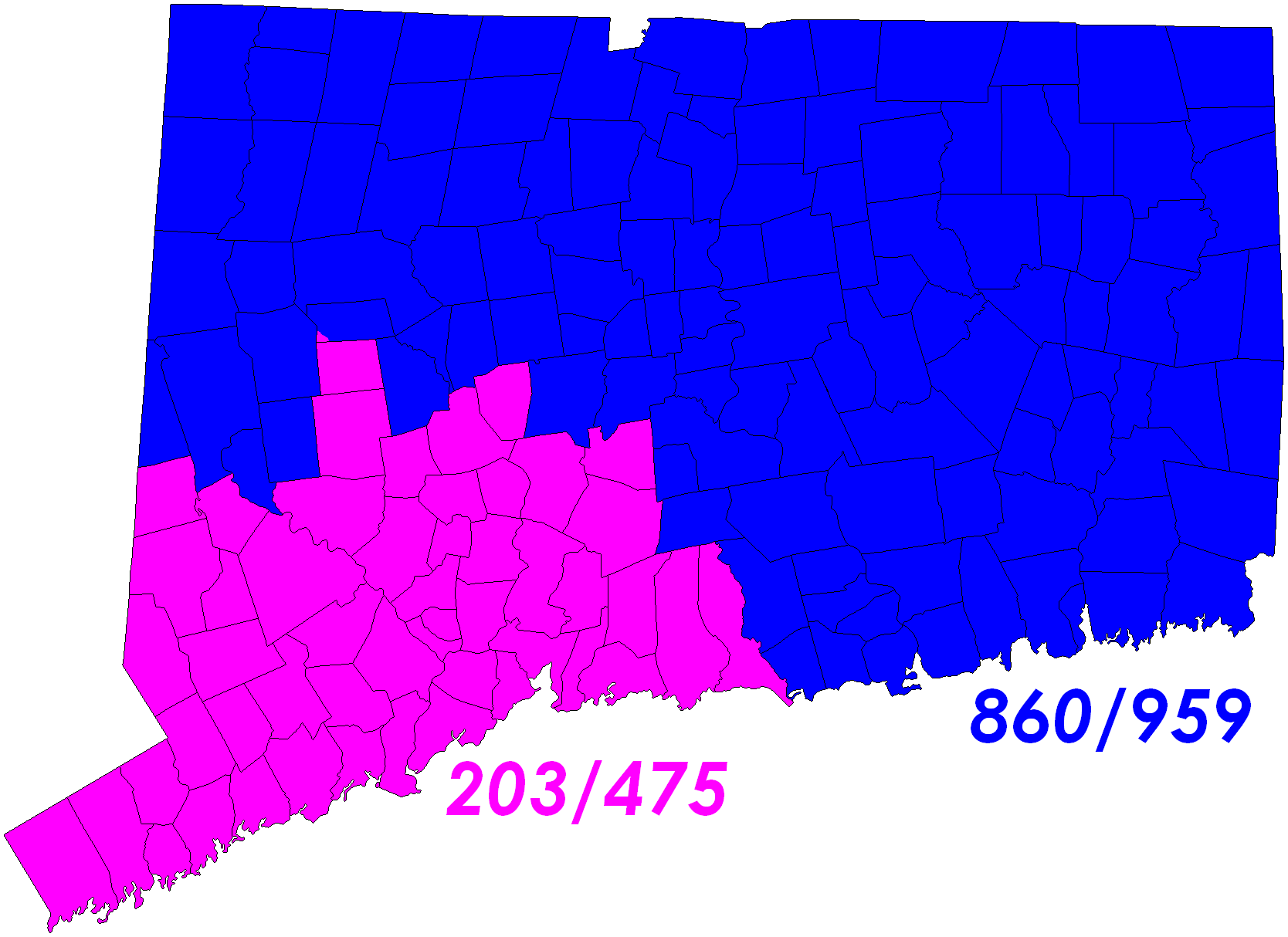
Numbering plan areas and area codes of Connecticut

The U.S. state of Connecticut is divided into two numbering plan areas, each configured as an overlay complex of two area codes each.

Area code	Year created	Parent NPA	Overlay	Numbering plan area
203	1947	–	203/475	Southwestern Connecticut (Fairfield County (except for Sherman); New Haven County, and the towns of Bethlehem, Woodbury, as well as a small part of Roxbury in Litchfield County)
475	2009	203	203/475	Southwestern Connecticut (Fairfield County (except for Sherman); New Haven County, and the towns of Bethlehem, Woodbury, as well as a small part of Roxbury in Litchfield County)
860	1995	203	860/959	Northern and eastern Connecticut
959	2014	860	860/959	Northern and eastern Connecticut
