= The Connecticut March =

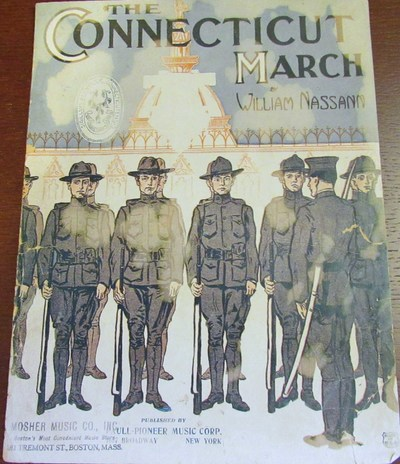
- Sheet music cover

Song
- Published: 1911, 1913, 1938
- Songwriter(s): William Nassann

The Connecticut March is a song originally from 1911, written by William Nassann. It was republished in 1913 and published again by Paull-Pioneer Music in 1938.
