= Southern New England ice storm of 1973 =

Weather event in the United States

Meteorological history
- Formed: December 16, 1973
- Dissipated: December 17, 1973

Ice Storm
- Lowest pressure: 992 mbar (992 hPa)
- Maximum snowfall or ice accretion: 1 inch of ice, 3-5 inches of rain, 18 inches of snow

Overall effects
- Areas affected: Connecticut, Massachusetts, New York, Rhode Island.
- Power outages: 180,000 at peak of storm

The Southern New England ice storm of 1973 was a winter storm that caused considerable damage to trees and power lines in parts of Connecticut, Massachusetts, and Rhode Island. It also affected New York State.

== Initial storm ==
A low pressure area formed over the southeastern United States and moved towards the northeast. It moved out into the western Atlantic Ocean and followed the east coast of the United States to just east of New Jersey and south of New England. Southern Plymouth County, Massachusetts, Bristol County, Massachusetts and Cape Cod, Massachusetts received three to five inches of rain in 24 hours that flooded basements, roadways and low-lying areas. Over the interior of southern New England, cold dense air was entrenched at the surface, and a northerly wind continued to reinforce the cold air. The storm then proceeded north through New England into Canada.

== Aftermath ==
Massachusetts was the hardest hit. At the peak of the storm, 100,000 homes and businesses were without power, and 4,000 homes were without heat, some for as long as 24 hours. Emergency shelters opened in Foster, Rhode Island, and Scituate, Rhode Island. There was some street and cellar flooding. Total damage in Rhode Island was estimated at more than $500,000 USD in 1973 dollars.

Massachusetts also reported much damage. At the peak of the storm, 80,000 homes and businesses were without power, including 80% of Sudbury, Massachusetts. The mayor of Marlboro, Massachusetts declared a state of emergency. Twenty streets in Wrentham, Massachusetts, were impassable due to downed trees and utilities. A 206-foot radio tower in Framingham, Massachusetts, collapsed from the weight of ice. In Arlington, Massachusetts, 35 trees were destroyed, and many old shade trees were destroyed in Concord. Total damage in Massachusetts was estimated at between $500,000 USD and $5,000,000 USD in 1973 dollars. It was the worst icing in Massachusetts since December 1968.

New York was spared the worst of the storm. The state's southeast area received five to ten inches of snow; its north, six to twelve inches; and central New York received ten to eighteen inches. On Long Island, 250,000 residents lost power, some for up to several days. Ice on the third rail of the Long Island Railroad left passengers marooned on trains for seven to ten hours.

The 1994 novel The Ice Storm takes place over Thanksgiving weekend 1973, during a dangerous ice storm.
