= Connecticut Environmental Policy Act =

The Connecticut Environmental Policy Act (CEPA) establishes environmental policy for the U.S. state of Connecticut. It requires an Environmental Impact Evaluation (EIE) for any state action which could potentially impact the natural environment. The lead agency is responsible for preparing the EIE, which is reviewed and approved by the Office of Policy and Management once it is completed.

== State law ==
Section 22a, Chapter 439 of the Connecticut General Statutes details the state's environmental policy and the EIE requirements of state agencies under CEPA. The objectives of CEPA are described in Section 1(b) of the act:

[I]t is the continuing responsibility of the state government to use all practicable means, consistent with other essential considerations of state policy, to improve and coordinate state plans, functions, programs, and resources to the end that the state may: (1) Fulfill the responsibility of each generation as trustee of the environment for succeeding generations; (2) assure for all residents of the state safe, healthful, productive, and esthetically and culturally pleasing surroundings; (3) attain the widest range of beneficial uses of the environment without degradation, risk to health or safety, or other undesirable and unintended consequences; (4) preserve important historic, cultural, and natural aspects of our Connecticut heritage, and maintain, wherever possible, an environment which supports diversity and variety of individual choice; (5) achieve an ecological balance between population and resource use which will permit high standards of living and a wide sharing of life's amenities; (6) enhance the quality of renewable resources and approach the maximum attainable recycling of depletable resources; and (7) practice conservation in the use of energy, maximize the use of energy efficient systems and minimize the environmental impact of energy production and use.

== Connecticut Environmental Impact Evaluation ==
CEPA states that, with a few exceptions, the sponsoring state agency must prepare an EIE before undertaking any action that may have significant impacts on the environment. Like the federal environmental impact statement, the EIE must include a range of alternatives along with the 'No Action' option. The EIE must consider the following impacts for each alternative:

- Land
- Watercourses and wetlands, including public water supply
- Air quality
- Natural habitats
- Threatened and endangered species
- Historical, archeological, and cultural sites
- Public health
- Existing housing and property values
- Aesthetics, traffic, and noise
- Energy consumption and conservation

Once the lead agency has completed an EIE, it is made available for public review and comment for 45 days (this period may be extended to 60 days for large or complex actions). Upon the expiration of the review and comment period the lead agency issues a Record of Decision and the EIE is submitted to the State Office of Policy and Management (OPM) for final review of the evaluation's adequacy. If the EIE is found to be inadequate, the OPM will require an EIE supplement from the lead agency, or reject it entirely if the EIE is seriously flawed.

Under CEPA, individuals, citizens' groups, municipal governments, or businesses can petition the Department of Energy and Environmental Protection (DEEP) to hold public hearings on an EIE after it has been released for review and comment. If the DEEP receives a petition containing 25 signatures or from an organization containing 25 members or more, the agency is required by law to hold a public hearing and consider comments submitted during the hearing. While the Office of Policy and Management approves an EIE, the Connecticut State Constitution delegates much of the state's authority to its 169 town governments. This arrangement gives the towns significant veto power over a state project since each affected town must issue its own permits for the portion of a state project within its jurisdiction, even after the state DEEP and OPM have both approved the project.

The majority of Connecticut's towns have ordinances that extend CEPA regulations to activities headed by an agency within the municipal government. Many towns require individuals and businesses to obtain a number of permits before starting a major project. The process of obtaining these permits requires at least some kind of environmental impact analysis and public hearings in most places. For most Connecticut towns the approval authority for issuing local permits rests with the Planning and Zoning Board, although additional approval by the local wetlands or conservation commission is necessary in some towns for a project to proceed.

== Exceptions ==
A federally mandated environmental impact statement (EIS) may be submitted in lieu of an EIE for a federal/state action, as long as the EIS contents meets all of the requirements for an equivalent EIE.
