= List of Connecticut tree species =

This is a list of trees that grow in Connecticut.

== Oaks ==
- Quercus alba - eastern white oak
- Quercus bicolor - swamp white oak
- Quercus coccinea - scarlet oak
- Quercus ilicifolia - scrub oak
- Quercus macrocarpa - bur oak
- Quercus montana - chestnut oak
- Quercus muehlenbergii - chinquapin oak
- Quercus palustris - pin oak
- Quercus prinoides - dwarf chinquapin oak
- Quercus rubra - northern red oak
- Quercus stellata - iron oak
- Quercus velutina - eastern black oak

== Maples ==
- Acer negundo - boxelder maple
- Acer nigrum - black maple
- Acer pensylvanicum - striped maple
- Acer rubrum - red maple
- Acer saccharinum - silver maple
- Acer saccharum - sugar maple
- Acer spicatum - mountain maple

== Birches ==
- Betula alleghaniensis - yellow birch
- Betula lenta - black birch
- Betula nigra - river birch
- Betula papyrifera - paper birch
- Betula populifolia - gray birch

== Beeches ==
- Fagus grandifolia - American beech

== Alders ==
- Alnus incana - speckled alder
- Alnus serrulata - smooth alder

== Hornbeams ==
- Carpinus caroliniana - American hornbeam

== Hophornbeams ==
- Ostrya virginiana - American hophornbeam

== Hickories ==
- Carya cordiformis - bitternut hickory
- Carya glabra - pignut hickory
- Carya ovata - snagbark hickory
- Carya tomentosa - mockernut hickory

== Walnuts ==
- Juglans cinerea - butternut
- Juglans nigra - eastern American black walnut

== Chestnuts ==
- Castanea dentata - American chestnut

== Poplars ==
- Populus balsamifera - balsam poplar
- Populus deltoides - eastern cottonwood
- Populus grandidentata - big-tooth aspen
- Populus heterophylla - swamp cottonwood
- Populus tremuloides - quaking aspen

== Ashes ==
- Fraxinus americana - white ash
- Fraxinus nigra - black ash
- Fraxinus pennsylvanica - green ash

== Hollies ==
- Ilex opaca - American holly

== Dogwoods ==
- Cornus alternifolia - alternate-leaved dogwood
- Cornus florida - flowering dogwood
- Cornus racemosa - northern swamp dogwood
- Cornus rugosa - roundleaf dogwood

== Sassafras ==
- Sassafras albidum - white sassafras

== Tupelos ==
- Nyssa sylvatica - black gum

== Plums ==
- Prunus alleghaniensis - Allegheny plum
- Prunus americana - American plum
- Prunus nigra - black plum
- Prunus pensylvanica - pin cherry
- Prunus serotina - black cherry
- Prunus virginiana - chokecherry

== Mountain ashes ==
- Sorbus americana - American mountain-ash
- Sorbus decora - northern mountain ash

== Serviceberries ==
- Amelanchier arborea - downy serviceberry

== Buttonbushes ==
- Cephalanthus occidentalis - common buttonbush

== Hackberries ==
- Celtis occidentalis - common hackberry

== Mulberries ==
- Morus rubra - red mulberry

== Elms ==
- Ulmus americana - American elm
- Ulmus rubra - slippery elm

== Sumacs ==
- Rhus copallina - shining sumac
- Rhus glabra - smooth sumac
- Rhus typhina - staghorn sumac

== Poison sumacs ==
- Toxicodendron vernix - poison sumac

== Sweetgums ==
- Liquidambar styraciflua - American sweetgum

== Lindens ==
- Tilia americana - American basswood

== Tulip trees ==
- Liriodendron tulipifera - tulip tree

== Viburnums ==
- Viburnum lentago - sweet viburnum
- Viburnum prunifolium - blackhaw

== Prickly-ashes ==
- Zanthoxylum americanum - northern prickly-ash

== Willows ==
- Salix bebbiana - gray willow
- Salix discolor - American pussy willow
- Salix lucida - shining willow
- Salix nigra - black willow
- Salix petiolaris - slender willow

== Planes ==
- Platanus occidentalis - American sycamore

== Pines ==
- Pinus resinosa - red pine
- Pinus rigida - pitch pine
- Pinus strobus - eastern white pine

== Spruces ==
- Picea mariana - black spruce
- Picea rubens - red spruce

== Hemlocks ==
- Tsuga canadensis - eastern hemlock

== Firs ==
- Abies balsamea - balsam fir

== Larches ==
- Larix laricina - eastern larch

== Junipers ==
- Juniperus communis - common juniper
- Juniperus virginiana - eastern juniper

== Arborvitaes ==
- Thuja occidentalis - northern white-cedar

== False cypresses ==
- Chamaecyparis thyoides - Atlantic white cedar
