= Connecticut State News Bureau =

News service in Connecticut, US

The Connecticut State News Bureau is a news service providing coverage of the Connecticut state capital and Connecticut politics. It was founded by Gail Collins. When she sold it in 1977, it had grown into the largest service of its kind in the United States.
