= Geology of Connecticut =

As part of New England, Connecticut has undergone much geologic change shaped by plate tectonics, volcanism, and glacial activity.

== Appalachian Mountains ==
During the early Triassic period, the super-continent Pangea was formed as the Iapetus Ocean closed up and the proto-North American continent collided with Avalonia, part of modern-day Africa. This caused great uplift and the formation of the Appalachian Mountains, which, at the time, were bigger than modern-day Himalayas. Erosion of the Appalachian Mountains now exposes metamorphic rocks once very deep in the Earth's mantle and uplifted during this time period.

== Eastern Border Fault ==
About 200 million years after this collision and the formation of Pangea, during the middle of the Mesozoic Era, the Atlantic Ocean floor started spreading and great extensional forces were experienced, resulting in faulting. Connecticut's Eastern border fault was formed, a fault which begins in New Haven and stretches 210 kilometers or 130 miles up to Keene, New Hampshire. As a result, the land west of this fault was downset, resulting in a rift valley and causing the land to tilt an average of 15 to 25 degrees. The fault is currently inactive. The formation of this basin eventually refilled with soft fluvial and alluvial sediments.

== Ice Age ==
During Ice Ages, glacial activity shaped much of New England’s landscape, eroding mountains, leaving glacial till scattered everywhere, and forming glacial lakes. At its greatest extent, one of these glaciers left behind a moraine which became today's Long Island. One of the biggest glacial lakes of the time was Glacial Lake Hitchcock. It formed when the Laurentide Ice Sheet retreated and glacial meltwater began to accumulate at the glacier's terminal moraine in Rocky Hill, Connecticut and back up into the Connecticut River. The glacial lake left behind a soft, varved landscape, gathering silt and sand in the summertime due to the influx of glacial meltwater and clay in the wintertime as the lake froze until it was later drained.

== River Valley ==
This soft surface has since been downcut, resedimented and oft flooded by the Connecticut River, making it a very soft, nutrient-replenished area and host to the majority of Connecticut's farmland soils. The land on either side of the Connecticut River Valley is less suitable for farmlands. The eastern section holds the shallow Proto-North American Terrane while the western section contains the Iapetos and Avalonian Terranes, which still holds remnants of glacial till and lack the soft fluvial sediments so prominent in the Connecticut River Valley region.

== See also ==
- East Haven, Connecticut#Geology
