= List of television stations in Connecticut =

This is a list of broadcast television stations that are licensed in the U.S. state of Connecticut.

== Full-power ==
- Stations are arranged by media market served and channel position.

Full-power television stations in Connecticut
Media market	Station	Channel	Primary affiliation(s)	Notes	Refs
Hartford–New Haven	WFSB	3	CBS		
Hartford–New Haven	WTNH	8	ABC		
Hartford–New Haven	WUVN	18	Univision		
Hartford–New Haven	WCCT-TV	20	The CW	(Note: Licensed to Waterbury, Connecticut.)	
Hartford–New Haven	WEDH	24	PBS		
Hartford–New Haven	WHPX-TV	26	Ion Television	(Note: Licensed to New London, Connecticut.)	
Hartford–New Haven	WVIT	30	NBC	(Note: Licensed to New Britain, Connecticut.)	
Hartford–New Haven	WCTX	59	MyNetworkTV		
Hartford–New Haven	WTIC-TV	61	Fox		
Hartford–New Haven	WEDY	65	CPTV Spirit, PBS on 65.3		
Hartford–New Haven	WEDN	53	PBS	(Note: Licensed to Norwich, Connecticut.) (Note: Satellite of WEDH.)	
~New York City, NY	WZME	43	Story Television	(Note: Licensed to Bridgeport, Connecticut.)	
~New York City, NY	WEDW	49	PBS		

== Low-power ==
Low-power television stations in Connecticut
Media market	Station	Channel	Primary affiliation(s)	Notes	Refs
Hartford–New Haven	WETN-LD	16	Retro TV	(Note: Licensed to Allingtown, Connecticut.)	
Hartford–New Haven	WRDM-CD	19	Telemundo, TeleXitos on 19.2		
Hartford–New Haven	WWAX-LD	27	Independent		
Hartford–New Haven	WRNT-LD	32	Various		
Hartford–New Haven	WTXX-LD	34	Various	(Note: Licensed to Springfield, Massachusetts.)	
Hartford–New Haven	WHCT-LD	35	MeTV		
Hartford–New Haven	WUTH-CD	47	UniMás		

== Defunct ==
- WICC-TV Bridgeport (1953–1960)
