= List of Superfund sites in Connecticut =

This is a list of Superfund sites in Connecticut designated under the Comprehensive Environmental Response, Compensation, and Liability Act (CERCLA) environmental law. The CERCLA federal law of 1980 authorized the United States Environmental Protection Agency (EPA) to create a list of polluted locations requiring a long-term response to clean up hazardous material contaminations. These locations are known as Superfund sites, and are placed on the National Priorities List (NPL).

The NPL guides the EPA in "determining which sites warrant further investigation" for environmental remediation. As of December 16, 2010, there were 14 Superfund sites on the National Priorities List in Connecticut. One additional site has been proposed for entry on the list. Three sites has been cleaned up and removed from the list.

== Superfund sites ==
Proposed for addition to National Priorities List
Deleted from National Priorities List

CERCLIS ID	Name	County	Reason	Proposed	Listed	Construction completed	Partially deleted	Deleted
CTD980670814	Kellogg-Deering Well Field	Fairfield	Groundwater and soil are contaminated with VOCs, primarily TCE and PCE.	09/08/1983	09/21/1984	09/23/1996	N/A	N/A
CTD001186618	Raymark Industries, Inc.	Fairfield		01/18/1994	04/25/1995	N/A	N/A	N/A
CT0002055887	Broad Brook Mill	Hartford		12/01/2000	N/A	N/A	N/A	N/A
CTD980670806	Old Southington Landfill	Hartford		09/08/1983	09/21/1984	09/12/2018	N/A	09/12/2018
CTD009717604	Solvents Recovery Service New England	Hartford		12/30/1982	09/08/1983	N/A	N/A	N/A
CTD980732333	Barkhamsted-New Hartford Landfill	Litchfield	Groundwater underlying the site is contaminated with VOCs including xylene, toluene, and vinyl chloride.	06/24/1988	10/04/1989	09/28/2001	N/A	N/A
CTD001452093	Durham Meadows	Middlesex		06/24/1988	10/04/1989	N/A	N/A	N/A
CTD072122062	Beacon Heights Landfill	New Haven		12/30/1982	09/08/1983	09/09/1998	N/A	N/A
CTD981067317	Cheshire Ground Water Contamination	New Haven		06/24/1988	08/30/1990	12/31/1996	N/A	07/02/1997
CTD980521165	Laurel Park Incorporated	New Haven		12/30/1982	09/08/1983	09/11/1998	N/A	N/A
CTD980669261	Nutmeg Valley Road	New Haven		01/22/1987	03/31/1989	09/28/2004	N/A	09/23/2005
CT0002265551	Scovill Industrial Landfill	New Haven		05/11/2000	07/27/2000	N/A	N/A	N/A
CTD980906515	New London Submarine Base	New London		10/26/1989	08/30/1990	N/A	N/A	N/A
CTD051316313	Precision Plating Corp.	Tolland		06/24/1988	10/04/1989	N/A	N/A	N/A
CTD108960972	Gallup's Quarry	Windham		06/24/1988	10/04/1989	09/30/1997	N/A	N/A
CTD001153923	Linemaster Switch Corporation	Windham		06/24/1988	02/21/1990	03/29/2005	N/A	N/A
CTD004532610	Revere Textile Prints Corporation	Windham		06/10/1986	07/22/1987	09/30/1992	N/A	09/02/1994
CTD009774969	Yaworski Waste Lagoon	Windham		12/30/1982	09/08/1983	09/20/2000	N/A	N/A

== See also ==
- List of Superfund sites in the United States
- List of environmental issues
- List of waste types
- TOXMAP
