= List of counties in Connecticut =

Counties of Connecticut
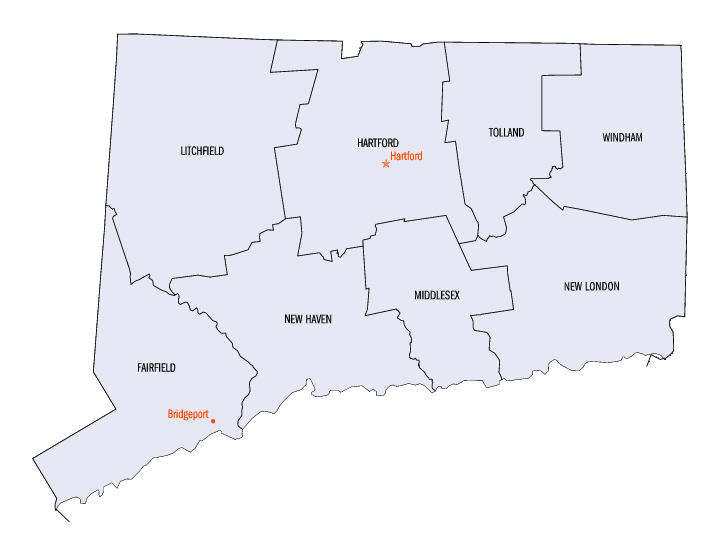
- Location: State of Connecticut
- Number: 8
- Populations: 116,418 (Windham) – 957,419 (Fairfield)
- Areas: 369 square miles (960 km^{2}) (Middlesex) – 920 square miles (2,400 km^{2}) (Litchfield)
- Government: County government (abolished in 1960, except for county sheriffs, which were abolished by an act of the state legislature effective in 2000)
- Subdivisions: Cities, towns, unincorporated communities, census-designated places (Note: All land in Connecticut is covered by an incorporated city or town. County borders match constituent city and town borders. See local government in Connecticut.)

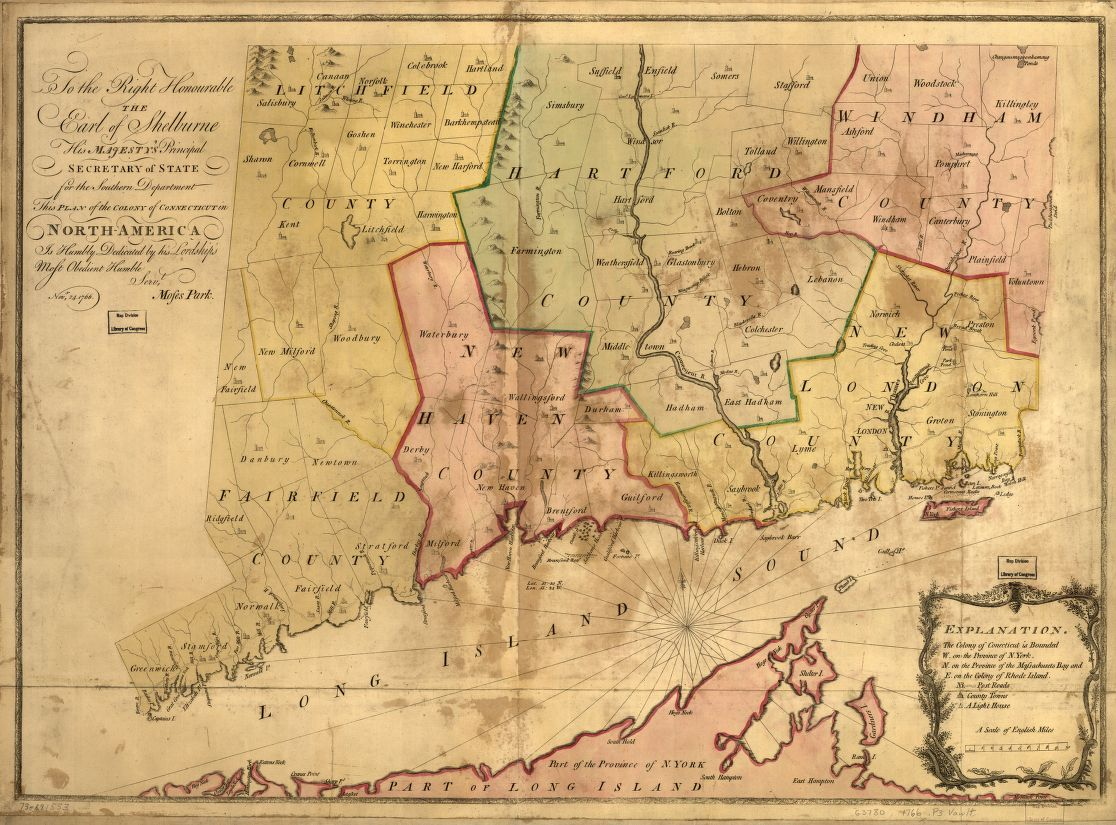
Map of the counties of colonial Connecticut, 1766.

There are eight counties in the U.S. state of Connecticut.

Four of the counties – Fairfield, Hartford, New Haven and New London – were created in 1666, shortly after the Connecticut Colony and the New Haven Colony combined. Windham and Litchfield counties were created later in the colonial era, while Middlesex and Tolland counties were created after American independence (both in 1785). Six of the counties are named for locations in England, where many early Connecticut settlers originated; Fairfield County was named after the salt marshes that bordered the coast, while New Haven County was named for the New Haven Colony.

Although Connecticut is divided into counties, there are no county-level governments, and local government in Connecticut exists solely at the municipal level. Almost all functions of county government were abolished in Connecticut in 1960, except for elected county sheriffs and their departments under them. Those offices and their departments were abolished by an act of the state legislature effective in December 2000. The functions the county sheriffs' departments played were assumed by the newly organized State Marshal Commission and the Connecticut Department of Corrections.

These counties are used in legacy geography, such as identifying land, national statistics, and personnel rostering and court jurisdictions in the state's judicial and state marshal system. However, the three most populous—Fairfield, Hartford and New Haven—are subdivided in the state's judicial system.

In 2019, the state recommended to the United States Census Bureau that the nine councils of governments replace its counties for statistical purposes. According to the Census Bureau, "Connecticut's COGs/Planning Regions have the authority to carry out administrative functions that are typically found among counties in other states." This proposal was approved by the Census Bureau in 2022, and was fully implemented in 2024.

== U.S. Census Bureau ==
Comparison of county boundaries to planning regions

The United States Census Bureau formally recognized the planning regions/councils of government as county equivalents in the Federal Register on June 6, 2022. A draft notice of potential recognition would have adapted the existing FIPS codes for the eight "legacy counties", however in response to submitted comments, the bureau retired the codes and assigned new ones to more clearly illustrate the break in geographic continuity. The Census noted that there is substantial correlation between the historic county borders and planning regions, however planning regions may incorporate towns from several counties. The bureau notes that the recognition of planning regions as county equivalents was unique to the specific conditions in Connecticut, and would not constitute a binding precedent on similar conditions in other states. However, Connecticut's historic county borders and planning regions are not directly interchangeable. Data comparisons across the transition therefore require attention to the geographic vintage and identifiers used by each dataset, particularly for products that continued to use older county boundaries during the phase-in of the new system.

== Alphabetical listing ==
County	FIPS code	Seat (Note: Officially, Connecticut has no county seats. The listed communities are instead historical county seats.)	Est.	Origin	Etymology	Population	Area	Map
Fairfield County	001	Bridgeport	May 10, 1666	original county	From the hundreds of acres of salt marsh that bordered the coast.	959,768	626 sq mi (1,621 km^{2})	State map highlighting Fairfield County
Hartford County	003	Hartford	May 10, 1666	original county	After Hertford, England (still said Hartford)	896,854	736 sq mi (1,906 km^{2})	State map highlighting Hartford County
Litchfield County	005	Litchfield	October 9, 1751	From parts of Fairfield, Hartford and New Haven Counties	City of Lichfield, Staffordshire, England	185,000	920 sq mi (2,383 km^{2})	State map highlighting Litchfield County
Middlesex County	007	Middletown	May 12, 1785	From parts of Hartford and New London Counties	Former county of Middlesex, England	164,759	369 sq mi (956 km^{2})	State map highlighting Middlesex County
New Haven County	009	New Haven	May 10, 1666	original county	After New Haven Colony, founded as a haven in which Puritans could be free from persecution.	863,700	606 sq mi (1,570 km^{2})	State map highlighting New Haven County
New London County	011	New London	May 10, 1666	original county	After London, England	268,805	666 sq mi (1,725 km^{2})	State map highlighting New London County
Tolland County	013	Rockville	October 13, 1785	From parts of Hartford and Windham Counties	Hamlet of Tolland, Somerset, England	150,293	410 sq mi (1,062 km^{2})	State map highlighting Tolland County
Windham County	015	Willimantic	May 12, 1726	From parts of Hartford and New London Counties	Either after Windham (now Wineham) in Sussex or Windham (now Wymondham, still said Windham) in Norfolk, England	116,418	513 sq mi (1,329 km^{2})	State map highlighting Windham County

== Racial / Ethnic Profile of counties in Connecticut (2020 Census) ==
Racial and ethnic composition of counties in Connecticut (2020 Census) (NH = Non-Hispanic) Note: the US Census treats Hispanic/Latino as an ethnic category. This table excludes Latinos from the racial categories and assigns them to a separate category. Hispanics/Latinos may be of any race.
County	Location of County	Total Population	White alone (NH)	%	Black or African American alone (NH)	%	Native American or Alaska Native alone (NH)	%	Asian alone (NH)	%	Pacific Islander alone (NH)	%	Other race alone (NH)	%	Mixed race or Multiracial (NH)	%	Hispanic or Latino (any race)	%
Fairfield		957,419	552,125	57.67%	99,992	10.44%	858	0.09%	50,751	5.30%	173	0.02%	11,232	1.17%	36,937	3.86%	205,351	21.45%
Hartford		899,498	523,105	58.16%	118,154	13.14%	1,166	0.13%	53,325	5.93%	172	0.02%	5,659	0.63%	31,642	3.52%	166,275	18.49%
Litchfield		185,186	155,601	84.02%	2,957	1.60%	268	0.14%	3,434	1.85%	63	0.03%	931	0.50%	7,352	3.97%	14,580	7.87%
Middlesex		164,245	131,954	80.34%	8,001	4.87%	214	0.13%	4,923	3.00%	43	0.03%	744	0.45%	6,438	3.92%	11,928	7.26%
New Haven		864,835	509,688	58.93%	110,273	12.75%	1,413	0.16%	36,995	4.28%	247	0.03%	5,953	0.69%	30,185	3.49%	170,081	19.67%
New London		268,555	194,894	72.57%	14,422	5.37%	1,977	0.74%	10,633	3.96%	215	0.08%	1,415	0.53%	14,079	5.24%	30,920	11.51%
Tolland		149,788	120,021	80.13%	5,074	3.39%	182	0.12%	8,438	5.63%	44	0.03%	636	0.42%	5,694	3.80%	9,699	6.48%
Windham		116,418	91,844	78.89%	2,064	1.77%	326	0.28%	1,960	1.68%	17	0.01%	506	0.43%	5,242	4.50%	14,459	12.42%

== Former counties ==
Both were extraterritorial:

- Trumbull County, the Connecticut Western Reserve, ceded to Ohio in 1800
- Westmoreland County, Connecticut around Wilkes-Barre, ceded to Pennsylvania in 1784
