= List of municipalities in Connecticut =

Municipalities of Connecticut
- Towns (light grey) and cities (dark grey) of Connecticut
- Location: State of Connecticut
- Number: 169
- Populations: 785 (Union) – 148,654 (Bridgeport)
- Areas: 4.98 square miles (12.9 km^{2}) (Derby) – 61.59 square miles (159.5 km^{2}) (New Milford)
- Government: Council-manager, Mayor-council, Representative town meeting, Town meeting

The U.S. state of Connecticut is divided into 169 municipalities, including 19 cities, 149 towns and one borough, which are grouped into eight historical counties, as well as nine planning regions which serve as county equivalents.

Towns traditionally have a town meeting form of government; under the Home Rule Act, however, towns are free to choose their own government structure. Nineteen of the towns in Connecticut are consolidated city-towns, and one (Naugatuck) is a consolidated borough-town.

City incorporation requires a Special Act by the Connecticut General Assembly. All cities in Connecticut are dependent municipalities, meaning they are located within and subordinate to a town. However, except for one, all currently existing cities in Connecticut are consolidated with their parent town. Former inner-cities are listed in a separate table below.

Towns in Connecticut are allowed to adopt a city form of government without the need to re-incorporate as an inner-city. Connecticut state law also makes no distinction between a consolidated town/city and a regular town. Bolded city names indicate the state's largest cities, with the most populated being Bridgeport. Currently, Tolland County and Windham County are the only counties in Connecticut without a single city in them.

Municipalities
Name	Designation	Town incorporation or recognition (Note: Dates refer to the underlying town, including towns subsequently consolidated with cities or a borough. Early colonial town organization often occurred through naming or recognition rather than a separate formal incorporation act. The notes distinguish these events and later city incorporation dates.)	Land area (square miles)	Population (2020)	Density (2020) (/sq mi)	Population (2010)	Change	Percentage change	Form of government	County	Planning region
Andover	Town	1848	15.46	3,151	203.8	3,303	−152	−4.6%	Town meeting	Tolland County	Capitol
Ansonia	City	1889	6.03	18,918	3,137.3	19,249	−331	−1.7%	Mayor-council	New Haven County	Naugatuck Valley
Ashford	Town	1714	38.79	4,191	108.0	4,317	−126	−2.9%	Town meeting	Windham County	Northeastern Connecticut
Avon	Town	1830	23.12	18,932	818.9	18,098	+834	+4.6%	Council-manager	Hartford County	Capitol
Barkhamsted	Town	1779	36.22	3,647	100.7	3,799	−152	−4.0%	Town meeting	Litchfield County	Northwest Hills
Beacon Falls	Town	1871	9.78	6,000	613.5	6,049	−49	−0.8%	Town meeting	New Haven County	Naugatuck Valley
Berlin	Town	1785	26.45	20,175	762.8	19,866	+309	+1.6%	Council-manager	Hartford County	Capitol
Bethany	Town	1832	20.97	5,297	252.6	5,563	−266	−4.8%	Town meeting	New Haven County	South Central
Bethel	Town	1855	16.79	20,358	1,212.5	18,584	+1,774	+9.5%	Town meeting	Fairfield County	Western Connecticut
Bethlehem	Town	1787	19.36	3,385	174.8	3,607	−222	−6.2%	Town meeting	Litchfield County	Naugatuck Valley
Bloomfield	Town	1835	26.01	21,535	828.0	20,486	+1,049	+5.1%	Council-manager	Hartford County	Capitol
Bolton	Town	1720	14.41	4,858	337.1	4,980	−122	−2.4%	Town meeting	Tolland County	Capitol
Bozrah	Town	1786	19.97	2,429	121.6	2,627	−198	−7.5%	Town meeting	New London County	Southeastern Connecticut
Branford	Town	1685 (Note: Town privileges were restored in 1685, when a patent was granted; settlement began in 1644.)	21.98	28,273	1,286.3	28,026	+247	+0.9%	Representative town meeting	New Haven County	South Central
Bridgeport	City	1821	16	148,654	9,290.9	144,229	+4,425	+3.1%	Mayor-council	Fairfield County	Greater Bridgeport
Bridgewater	Town	1856	16.23	1,662	102.4	1,727	−65	−3.8%	Town meeting	Litchfield County	Western Connecticut
Bristol	City	1785	26.51	60,833	2,294.7	60,477	+356	+0.6%	Mayor-council	Hartford County	Naugatuck Valley
Brookfield	Town	1788	19.8	17,528	885.3	16,452	+1,076	+6.5%	Town meeting	Fairfield County	Western Connecticut
Brooklyn	Town	1786	28.97	8,450	291.7	8,210	+240	+2.9%	Town meeting	Windham County	Northeastern Connecticut
Burlington	Town	1806	29.8	9,519	319.4	9,301	+218	+2.3%	Town meeting	Hartford County	Northwest Hills
Canaan	Town	1739	32.95	1,080	32.8	1,234	−154	−12.5%	Town meeting	Litchfield County	Northwest Hills
Canterbury	Town	1703	39.9	5,045	126.4	5,132	−87	−1.7%	Town meeting	Windham County	Northeastern Connecticut
Canton	Town	1806	24.57	10,124	412.0	10,292	−168	−1.6%	Town meeting	Hartford County	Capitol
Chaplin	Town	1822	19.43	2,151	110.7	2,305	−154	−6.7%	Town meeting	Windham County	Northeastern Connecticut
Cheshire	Town	1780	32.91	28,733	873.1	29,261	−528	−1.8%	Council-manager	New Haven County	Naugatuck Valley
Chester	Town	1836	16.03	3,749	233.9	3,994	−245	−6.1%	Town meeting	Middlesex County	Lower Connecticut River Valley
Clinton	Town	1838	16.28	13,185	809.9	13,260	−75	−0.6%	Council-manager	Middlesex County	Lower Connecticut River Valley
Colchester	Town	1698	49.06	15,555	317.1	16,068	−513	−3.2%	Town meeting	New London County	Southeastern Connecticut
Colebrook	Town	1779	31.47	1,361	43.2	1,485	−124	−8.4%	Town meeting	Litchfield County	Northwest Hills
Columbia	Town	1804	21.36	5,272	246.8	5,485	−213	−3.9%	Town meeting	Tolland County	Capitol
Cornwall	Town	1740	46.01	1,567	34.1	1,420	+147	+10.4%	Town meeting	Litchfield County	Northwest Hills
Coventry	Town	1712	37.72	12,235	324.4	12,435	−200	−1.6%	Council-manager	Tolland County	Capitol
Cromwell	Town	1851	12.39	14,225	1,148.1	14,005	+220	+1.6%	Town meeting	Middlesex County	Lower Connecticut River Valley
Danbury	City	1702	42.11	86,518	2,054.6	80,893	+5,625	+7.0%	Mayor-council	Fairfield County	Western Connecticut
Darien	Town	1820	12.86	21,499	1,671.8	20,732	+767	+3.7%	Representative town meeting	Fairfield County	Western Connecticut
Deep River	Town	1859 (Note: Incorporated as Saybrook in 1859, according to the town’s 2023 municipal assessment; renamed Deep River in 1947. The earlier date of 1635 refers to settlement of Saybrook Colony.)	13.55	4,415	325.8	4,629	−214	−4.6%	Town meeting	Middlesex County	Lower Connecticut River Valley
Derby	City	1675 (Note: The Derby Historical Society dates town incorporation to May 13, 1675. The Connecticut State Library instead lists 1675 as naming and 1775 as incorporation.)	4.98	12,325	2,474.9	12,902	−577	−4.5%	Mayor-council	New Haven County	Naugatuck Valley
Durham	Town	1708	23.6	7,152	303.1	7,388	−236	−3.2%	Town meeting	Middlesex County	Lower Connecticut River Valley
East Granby	Town	1858	17.48	5,214	298.3	5,148	+66	+1.3%	Town meeting	Hartford County	Capitol
East Haddam	Town	1734	54.33	8,875	163.4	9,126	−251	−2.8%	Town meeting	Middlesex County	Lower Connecticut River Valley
East Hampton	Town	1767	35.59	12,717	357.3	12,959	−242	−1.9%	Council-manager	Middlesex County	Lower Connecticut River Valley
East Hartford	Town	1783	18.02	51,045	2,832.7	51,252	−207	−0.4%	Mayor-council	Hartford County	Capitol
East Haven	Town	1785	12.26	27,923	2,277.6	29,257	−1,334	−4.6%	Mayor-council	New Haven County	South Central
East Lyme	Town	1839	34.03	18,693	549.3	19,159	−466	−2.4%	Town meeting	New London County	Southeastern Connecticut
East Windsor	Town	1768	26.29	11,190	425.6	11,162	+28	+0.3%	Town meeting	Hartford County	Capitol
Eastford	Town	1847	28.89	1,649	57.1	1,749	−100	−5.7%	Town meeting	Windham County	Northeastern Connecticut
Easton	Town	1845	27.42	7,605	277.4	7,490	+115	+1.5%	Town meeting	Fairfield County	Greater Bridgeport
Ellington	Town	1786	34.05	16,426	482.4	15,602	+824	+5.3%	Town meeting	Tolland County	Capitol
Enfield	Town	1683	33.38	42,141	1,262.5	44,654	−2,513	−5.6%	Council-manager	Hartford County	Capitol
Essex	Town	1852	10.36	6,733	649.9	6,683	+50	+0.7%	Town meeting	Middlesex County	Lower Connecticut River Valley
Fairfield	Town	1639	30.03	61,512	2,048.4	59,404	+2,108	+3.5%	Representative town meeting	Fairfield County	Greater Bridgeport
Farmington	Town	1645	28.06	26,712	952.0	25,340	+1,372	+5.4%	Council-manager	Hartford County	Capitol
Franklin	Town	1786	19.51	1,863	95.5	1,922	−59	−3.1%	Town meeting	New London County	Southeastern Connecticut
Glastonbury	Town	1693	51.37	35,159	684.4	34,427	+732	+2.1%	Council-manager	Hartford County	Capitol
Goshen	Town	1739	43.66	3,150	72.1	2,976	+174	+5.8%	Town meeting	Litchfield County	Northwest Hills
Granby	Town	1786	40.69	10,903	268.0	11,282	−379	−3.4%	Council-manager	Hartford County	Capitol
Greenwich	Town	1665 (Note: Declared a separate township in 1665; previously considered part of Stamford from 1656.)	47.83	63,518	1,328.0	61,171	+2,347	+3.8%	Representative town meeting	Fairfield County	Western Connecticut
Griswold	Town	1815	34.95	11,402	326.2	11,951	−549	−4.6%	Town meeting	New London County	Southeastern Connecticut
Groton	Town	1705	31.3	38,411	1,227.2	40,115	−1,704	−4.2%	Representative town meeting	New London County	Southeastern Connecticut
Guilford	Town	1639	47.05	22,073	469.1	22,375	−302	−1.3%	Town meeting	New Haven County	South Central
Haddam	Town	1668	44.03	8,452	192.0	8,346	+106	+1.3%	Town meeting	Middlesex County	Lower Connecticut River Valley
Hamden	Town	1786	32.78	61,169	1,866.0	60,960	+209	+0.3%	Mayor-council	New Haven County	South Central
Hampton	Town	1786	25	1,728	69.1	1,863	−135	−7.2%	Town meeting	Windham County	Northeastern Connecticut
Hartford	City	1637 (Note: The year refers to colonial naming and recognition. Settlement began in 1635; incorporation as a city occurred in 1784.)	17.31	121,054	6,993.3	124,775	−3,721	−3.0%	Mayor-council	Hartford County	Capitol
Hartland	Town	1761	33.03	1,901	57.6	2,114	−213	−10.1%	Town meeting	Hartford County	Northwest Hills
Harwinton	Town	1737	30.75	5,484	178.3	5,642	−158	−2.8%	Town meeting	Litchfield County	Northwest Hills
Hebron	Town	1708	36.9	9,098	246.6	9,686	−588	−6.1%	Town meeting	Tolland County	Capitol
Kent	Town	1739	48.47	3,019	62.3	2,979	+40	+1.3%	Town meeting	Litchfield County	Northwest Hills
Killingly	Town	1708	48.52	17,752	365.9	17,370	+382	+2.2%	Council-manager	Windham County	Northeastern Connecticut
Killingworth	Town	1667 (Note: The CERC profile describes 1667 as incorporation; the state historical account describes it as naming.)	35.33	6,174	174.8	6,525	−351	−5.4%	Town meeting	Middlesex County	Lower Connecticut River Valley
Lebanon	Town	1700	54.11	7,142	132.0	7,308	−166	−2.3%	Town meeting	New London County	Southeastern Connecticut
Ledyard	Town	1836	38.14	15,413	404.1	15,051	+362	+2.4%	Mayor-council	New London County	Southeastern Connecticut
Lisbon	Town	1786	16.26	4,195	258.0	4,338	−143	−3.3%	Town meeting	New London County	Southeastern Connecticut
Litchfield	Town	1719	56.06	8,192	146.1	8,466	−274	−3.2%	Town meeting	Litchfield County	Northwest Hills
Lyme	Town	1667 (Note: Separated from Saybrook in 1665; identified as incorporated in 1667 in the National Register nomination for the Captain Enoch Lord House.)	31.85	2,352	73.8	2,406	−54	−2.2%	Town meeting	New London County	Lower Connecticut River Valley
Madison	Town	1826	36.2	17,691	488.7	18,269	−578	−3.2%	Town meeting	New Haven County	South Central
Manchester	Town	1823	27.26	59,713	2,190.5	58,241	+1,472	+2.5%	Council-manager	Hartford County	Capitol
Mansfield	Town	1702	44.46	25,892	582.4	26,543	−651	−2.5%	Council-manager	Tolland County	Capitol
Marlborough	Town	1803	23.28	6,133	263.4	6,404	−271	−4.2%	Town meeting	Hartford County	Capitol
Meriden	City	1806	23.75	60,850	2,562.1	60,868	−18	−0.0%	Council-manager	New Haven County	South Central
Middlebury	Town	1807	17.75	7,574	426.7	7,575	−1	−0.0%	Town meeting	New Haven County	Naugatuck Valley
Middlefield	Town	1866	12.7	4,217	332.0	4,425	−208	−4.7%	Town meeting	Middlesex County	Lower Connecticut River Valley
Middletown	City	1651	40.9	47,717	1,166.7	47,648	+69	+0.1%	Mayor-council	Middlesex County	Lower Connecticut River Valley
Milford	City	1639	22.56	52,044	2,306.9	52,759	−715	−1.4%	Mayor-council	New Haven County	South Central
Monroe	Town	1823	26.13	18,825	720.4	19,479	−654	−3.4%	Mayor-council	Fairfield County	Greater Bridgeport
Montville	Town	1786	42.02	18,387	437.6	19,571	−1,184	−6.0%	Mayor-council	New London County	Southeastern Connecticut
Morris	Town	1859	17.19	2,256	131.2	2,388	−132	−5.5%	Town meeting	Litchfield County	Northwest Hills
Naugatuck	Borough	1844	16.39	31,519	1,923.1	31,862	−343	−1.1%	Mayor-council	New Haven County	Naugatuck Valley
New Britain	City	1850	13.34	74,135	5,557.3	73,206	+929	+1.3%	Mayor-council	Hartford County	Capitol
New Canaan	Town	1801	22.13	20,622	931.9	19,738	+884	+4.5%	Mayor-council	Fairfield County	Western Connecticut
New Fairfield	Town	1740	20.46	13,579	663.7	13,881	−302	−2.2%	Town meeting	Fairfield County	Western Connecticut
New Hartford	Town	1738	37.03	6,658	179.8	6,970	−312	−4.5%	Town meeting	Litchfield County	Northwest Hills
New Haven	City	1638 (Note: The CERC profile identifies 1638 as incorporation; the state historical account describes it as settlement. The town was named in 1640 and the city incorporated in 1784.)	18.85	134,023	7,110.0	129,779	+4,244	+3.3%	Mayor-council	New Haven County	South Central
New London	City	1646 (Note: The CERC profile identifies 1646 as incorporation; the state historical account describes it as settlement. Named New London in 1658; incorporated as a city in 1784.)	5.54	27,367	4,939.9	27,620	−253	−0.9%	Mayor-council	New London County	Southeastern Connecticut
New Milford	Town	1712	61.59	28,115	456.5	28,142	−27	−0.1%	Mayor-council	Litchfield County	Western Connecticut
Newington	Town	1871	13.18	30,536	2,316.8	30,562	−26	−0.1%	Council-manager	Hartford County	Capitol
Newtown	Town	1711	57.76	27,173	470.4	27,560	−387	−1.4%	Town meeting	Fairfield County	Western Connecticut
Norfolk	Town	1758	45.31	1,588	35.0	1,709	−121	−7.1%	Town meeting	Litchfield County	Northwest Hills
North Branford	Town	1831	24.92	13,544	543.5	14,407	−863	−6.0%	Council-manager	New Haven County	South Central
North Canaan	Town	1858	19.45	3,211	165.1	3,315	−104	−3.1%	Town meeting	Litchfield County	Northwest Hills
North Haven	Town	1786	20.77	24,253	1,167.7	24,093	+160	+0.7%	Town meeting	New Haven County	South Central
North Stonington	Town	1807	54.31	5,149	94.8	5,297	−148	−2.8%	Town meeting	New London County	Southeastern Connecticut
Norwalk	City	1651	22.81	91,184	3,997.5	85,603	+5,581	+6.5%	Mayor-council	Fairfield County	Western Connecticut
Norwich	City	1662	28.33	40,125	1,416.3	40,493	−368	−0.9%	Council-manager	New London County	Southeastern Connecticut
Old Lyme	Town	1855	23.1	7,628	330.2	7,603	+25	+0.3%	Town meeting	New London County	Lower Connecticut River Valley
Old Saybrook	Town	1854	15.04	10,481	696.9	10,242	+239	+2.3%	Town meeting	Middlesex County	Lower Connecticut River Valley
Orange	Town	1822	17.19	14,280	830.7	13,956	+324	+2.3%	Town meeting	New Haven County	South Central
Oxford	Town	1798	32.89	12,706	386.3	12,683	+23	+0.2%	Town meeting	New Haven County	Naugatuck Valley
Plainfield	Town	1699	42.27	14,973	354.2	15,405	−432	−2.8%	Town meeting	Windham County	Northeastern Connecticut
Plainville	Town	1869	9.76	17,525	1,795.6	17,716	−191	−1.1%	Council-manager	Hartford County	Capitol
Plymouth	Town	1795	21.72	11,671	537.3	12,243	−572	−4.7%	Mayor-council	Litchfield County	Naugatuck Valley
Pomfret	Town	1713	40.3	4,266	105.9	4,247	+19	+0.4%	Town meeting	Windham County	Northeastern Connecticut
Portland	Town	1841	23.4	9,384	401.0	9,508	−124	−1.3%	Town meeting	Middlesex County	Lower Connecticut River Valley
Preston	Town	1687	30.9	4,788	155.0	4,726	+62	+1.3%	Town meeting	New London County	Southeastern Connecticut
Prospect	Town	1827	14.32	9,401	656.5	9,405	−4	−0.0%	Mayor-council	New Haven County	Naugatuck Valley
Putnam	Town	1855	20.29	9,224	454.6	9,584	−360	−3.8%	Town meeting	Windham County	Northeastern Connecticut
Redding	Town	1767	31.5	8,765	278.3	9,158	−393	−4.3%	Town meeting	Fairfield County	Western Connecticut
Ridgefield	Town	1709	34.43	25,033	727.1	24,638	+395	+1.6%	Town meeting	Fairfield County	Western Connecticut
Rocky Hill	Town	1843	13.45	20,845	1,549.8	19,709	+1,136	+5.8%	Mayor-council	Hartford County	Capitol
Roxbury	Town	1796	26.23	2,260	86.2	2,262	−2	−0.1%	Town meeting	Litchfield County	Northwest Hills
Salem	Town	1819	28.95	4,213	145.5	4,151	+62	+1.5%	Town meeting	New London County	Southeastern Connecticut
Salisbury	Town	1741	57.32	4,194	73.2	3,741	+453	+12.1%	Town meeting	Litchfield County	Northwest Hills
Scotland	Town	1857	18.61	1,576	84.7	1,726	−150	−8.7%	Town meeting	Windham County	Northeastern Connecticut
Seymour	Town	1850	14.57	16,748	1,149.5	16,540	+208	+1.3%	Town meeting	New Haven County	Naugatuck Valley
Sharon	Town	1739	58.7	2,680	45.7	2,782	−102	−3.7%	Town meeting	Litchfield County	Northwest Hills
Shelton	City	1789	30.57	40,869	1,336.9	39,559	+1,310	+3.3%	Mayor-council	Fairfield County	Naugatuck Valley
Sherman	Town	1802	21.8	3,527	161.8	3,581	−54	−1.5%	Town meeting	Fairfield County	Western Connecticut
Simsbury	Town	1670	33.88	24,517	723.6	23,511	+1,006	+4.3%	Town meeting	Hartford County	Capitol
Somers	Town	1734	28.34	10,255	361.9	11,444	−1,189	−10.4%	Town meeting	Tolland County	Capitol
South Windsor	Town	1845	27.96	26,918	962.7	25,709	+1,209	+4.7%	Council-manager	Hartford County	Capitol
Southbury	Town	1787	39.06	19,879	508.9	19,904	−25	−0.1%	Town meeting	New Haven County	Naugatuck Valley
Southington	Town	1779	35.99	43,501	1,208.7	43,069	+432	+1.0%	Council-manager	Hartford County	Capitol
Sprague	Town	1861	13.21	2,967	224.6	2,984	−17	−0.6%	Town meeting	New London County	Southeastern Connecticut
Stafford	Town	1719	57.96	11,472	197.9	12,087	−615	−5.1%	Town meeting	Tolland County	Capitol
Stamford	City	1641 (Note: The CERC profile identifies 1641 as incorporation; the state historical account describes it as settlement. Named Stamford in 1642; incorporated as a city in 1893.)	37.75	135,470	3,588.6	122,643	+12,827	+10.5%	Mayor-council	Fairfield County	Western Connecticut
Sterling	Town	1794	27.23	3,578	131.4	3,830	−252	−6.6%	Town meeting	Windham County	Northeastern Connecticut
Stonington	Town	1658 (Note: Organized under Massachusetts jurisdiction as Southertown in 1658; became part of Connecticut in 1662 and received the name Stonington in 1666. The town’s welcome page instead identifies 1649 as incorporation.)	38.69	18,335	473.9	18,545	−210	−1.1%	Town meeting	New London County	Southeastern Connecticut
Stratford	Town	1639 (Note: The CERC profile identifies 1639 as incorporation; the state historical account describes it as settlement, followed by naming in 1643.)	17.59	52,355	2,976.4	51,384	+971	+1.9%	Mayor-council	Fairfield County	Greater Bridgeport
Suffield	Town	1674	42.21	15,752	373.2	15,735	+17	+0.1%	Town meeting	Hartford County	Capitol
Thomaston	Town	1875	12.01	7,442	619.7	7,887	−445	−5.6%	Town meeting	Litchfield County	Naugatuck Valley
Thompson	Town	1785	46.94	9,189	195.8	9,458	−269	−2.8%	Town meeting	Windham County	Northeastern Connecticut
Tolland	Town	1722	39.71	14,563	366.7	15,052	−489	−3.2%	Council-manager	Tolland County	Capitol
Torrington	City	1740	39.79	35,515	892.6	36,383	−868	−2.4%	Mayor-council	Litchfield County	Northwest Hills
Trumbull	Town	1797	23.29	36,827	1,581.2	36,018	+809	+2.2%	Mayor-council	Fairfield County	Greater Bridgeport
Union	Town	1734	28.71	785	27.3	854	−69	−8.1%	Town meeting	Tolland County	Northeastern Connecticut
Vernon	Town	1808	17.73	30,215	1,704.2	29,179	+1,036	+3.6%	Mayor-council	Tolland County	Capitol
Voluntown	Town	1721	38.92	2,570	66.0	2,603	−33	−1.3%	Town meeting	New London County	Northeastern Connecticut
Wallingford	Town	1670	39.02	44,396	1,137.8	45,135	−739	−1.6%	Mayor-council	New Haven County	South Central
Warren	Town	1786	26.31	1,351	51.3	1,461	−110	−7.5%	Town meeting	Litchfield County	Northwest Hills
Washington	Town	1779	38.19	3,646	95.5	3,578	+68	+1.9%	Town meeting	Litchfield County	Northwest Hills
Waterbury	City	1686	28.57	114,403	4,004.3	110,366	+4,037	+3.7%	Mayor-council	New Haven County	Naugatuck Valley
Waterford	Town	1801	32.75	19,571	597.6	19,517	+54	+0.3%	Representative town meeting	New London County	Southeastern Connecticut
Watertown	Town	1780	29.15	22,105	758.3	22,514	−409	−1.8%	Council-manager	Litchfield County	Naugatuck Valley
West Hartford	Town	1854	21.98	64,083	2,915.5	63,268	+815	+1.3%	Council-manager	Hartford County	Capitol
West Haven	City	1921	10.84	55,584	5,127.7	55,564	+20	+0.0%	Mayor-council	New Haven County	South Central
Westbrook	Town	1840	15.72	6,769	430.6	6,938	−169	−2.4%	Town meeting	Middlesex County	Lower Connecticut River Valley
Weston	Town	1787	19.8	10,354	522.9	10,179	+175	+1.7%	Town meeting	Fairfield County	Western Connecticut
Westport	Town	1835	20.01	27,141	1,356.4	26,391	+750	+2.8%	Representative town meeting	Fairfield County	Western Connecticut
Wethersfield	Town	1822 (Note: Formal incorporation in 1822 is reported by the town and state. Settlement began in 1634; the town was named Wethersfield in 1637.)	12.39	27,298	2,203.2	26,668	+630	+2.4%	Council-manager	Hartford County	Capitol
Willington	Town	1727	33.27	5,566	167.3	6,041	−475	−7.9%	Town meeting	Tolland County	Capitol
Wilton	Town	1802	26.95	18,503	686.6	18,062	+441	+2.4%	Town meeting	Fairfield County	Western Connecticut
Winchester	Town	1771	32.28	10,224	316.7	11,242	−1,018	−9.1%	Council-manager	Litchfield County	Northwest Hills
Windham	Town	1692	27.07	24,425	902.3	25,268	−843	−3.3%	Town meeting	Windham County	Southeastern Connecticut
Windsor	Town	1633 (Note: The CERC profile identifies 1633 as incorporation; the state historical account describes it as settlement. Named Windsor in 1637.)	29.63	29,492	995.3	29,044	+448	+1.5%	Council-manager	Hartford County	Capitol
Windsor Locks	Town	1854	9.03	12,613	1,396.8	12,498	+115	+0.9%	Town meeting	Hartford County	Capitol
Wolcott	Town	1796	20.43	16,142	790.1	16,680	−538	−3.2%	Mayor-council	New Haven County	Naugatuck Valley
Woodbridge	Town	1784	18.83	9,087	482.6	8,990	+97	+1.1%	Town meeting	New Haven County	South Central
Woodbury	Town	1673 (Note: The CERC profile identifies 1673 as incorporation; the state historical account describes it as naming.)	36.47	9,723	266.6	9,975	−252	−2.5%	Town meeting	Litchfield County	Naugatuck Valley
Woodstock	Town	1686 (Note: The town-hosted CERC profile identifies incorporation in 1686, as New Roxbury in Massachusetts. Renamed Woodstock in 1690; transferred to Connecticut in 1749.)	60.54	8,221	135.8	7,964	+257	+3.2%	Town meeting	Windham County	Northeastern Connecticut
Connecticut	Full State	Total:	4,844.80	3,605,944	744.3	3,573,711	32,223	+0.9%			

== Cities ==
There are currently 21 cities in Connecticut and those with a population greater than 100,000 are listed in bold.

City	County	Planning region	Population (2020)	Date chartered as city	Date consolidated with town
Ansonia	New Haven	Naugatuck Valley	18,918	1893	1893
**Bridgeport**	Fairfield	Greater Bridgeport	148,654	1836	1889
Bristol	Hartford	Naugatuck Valley	60,833	1911	1911
Danbury	Fairfield	Western Connecticut	86,518	1889	1965
Derby	New Haven	Naugatuck Valley	12,325	1893	1893
Groton	New London	Southeastern Connecticut	9,349	1964	Not consolidated
**Hartford**	Hartford	Capitol	121,054	1784	1896
Meriden	New Haven	South Central	60,850	1867	1922
Middletown	Middlesex	Lower Connecticut River Valley	47,717	1784	1924
Milford	New Haven	South Central	50,558	1959	1959
New Britain	Hartford	Capitol	74,135	1870	1906
**New Haven**	New Haven	South Central	134,023	1784	1897
New London	New London	Southeastern Connecticut	27,367	1784	1874
Norwalk	Fairfield	Western Connecticut	91,184	1893	1913
Norwich	New London	Southeastern Connecticut	40,125	1784	1952
Shelton	Fairfield	Naugatuck Valley	40,869	1915	1915
**Stamford**	Fairfield	Western Connecticut	135,470	1893	1949
Torrington	Litchfield	Northwest Hills	35,515	1923	1923
**Waterbury**	New Haven	Naugatuck Valley	114,403	1853	1902
West Haven	New Haven	South Central	55,584	1961	1961
Winsted	Litchfield	Northwest Hills	7,712 (2010 population)	1917	1915

=== Former cities ===
Former city	County	Planning region	Date chartered as city	Date of disestablishment	Disposition
South Norwalk	Fairfield	Western Connecticut	1871	1913	Consolidated with Town and City of Norwalk in 1913. Now a neighborhood and a taxing district
Rockville	Tolland	Capitol	1889	1965	Consolidated with the Town of Vernon. Now a CDP.
Willimantic	Windham	Southeastern Connecticut	1893	1983	Now a CDP in the town of Windham
Putnam	Windham	Northeastern Connecticut	1895	1984	Now a CDP in the town of Putnam

=== Gallery ===
Connecticut cities

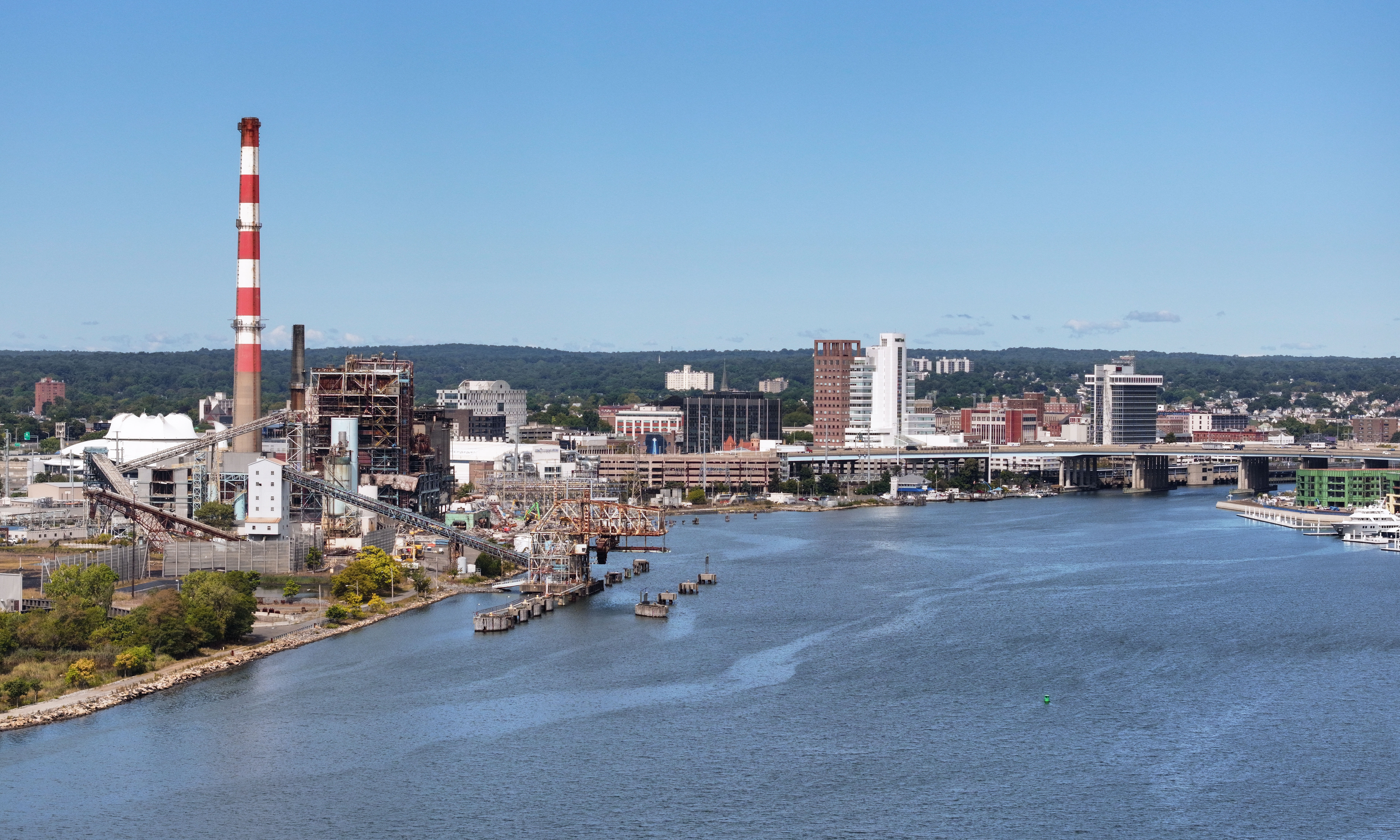
Bridgeport

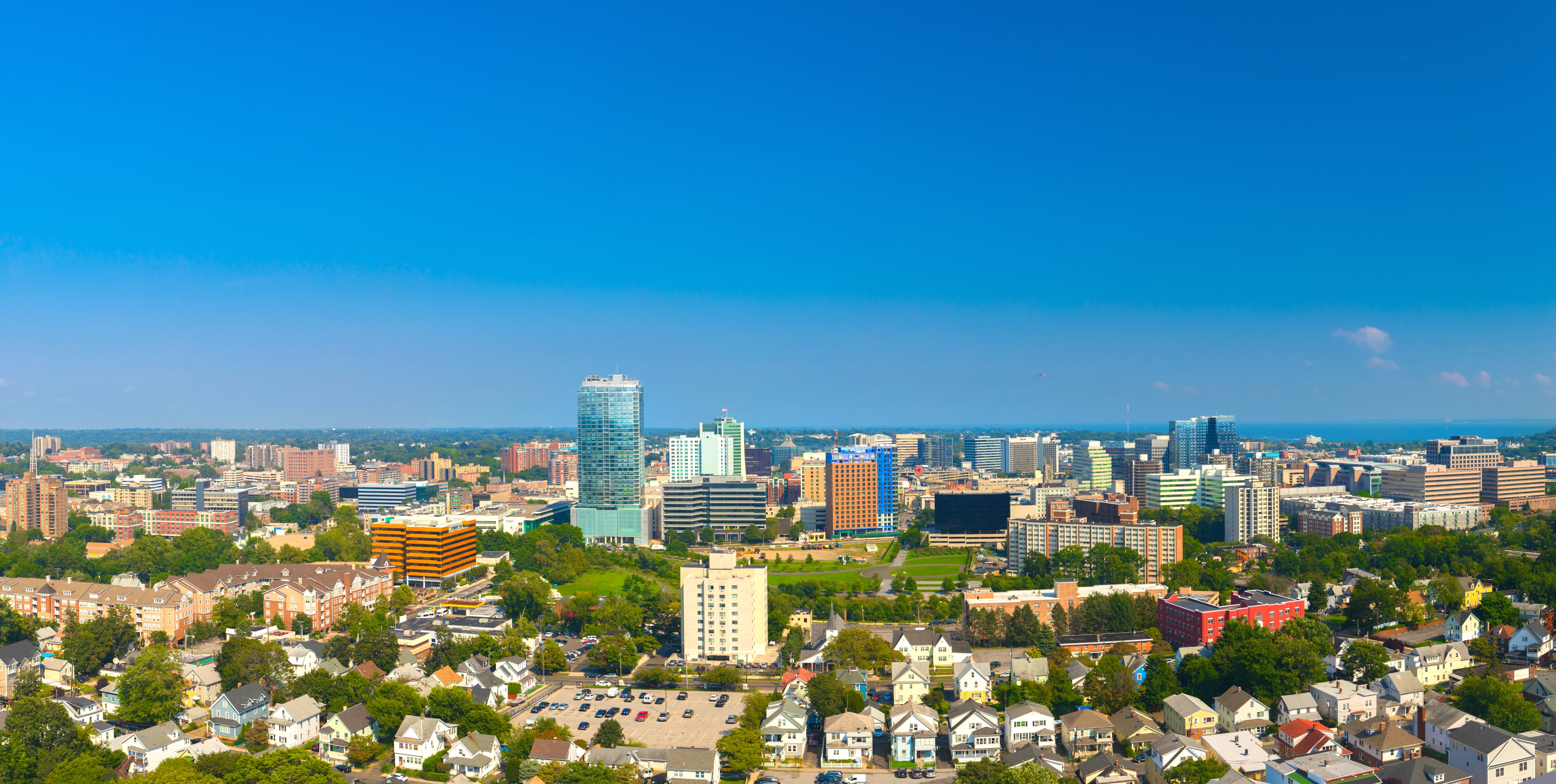
Stamford

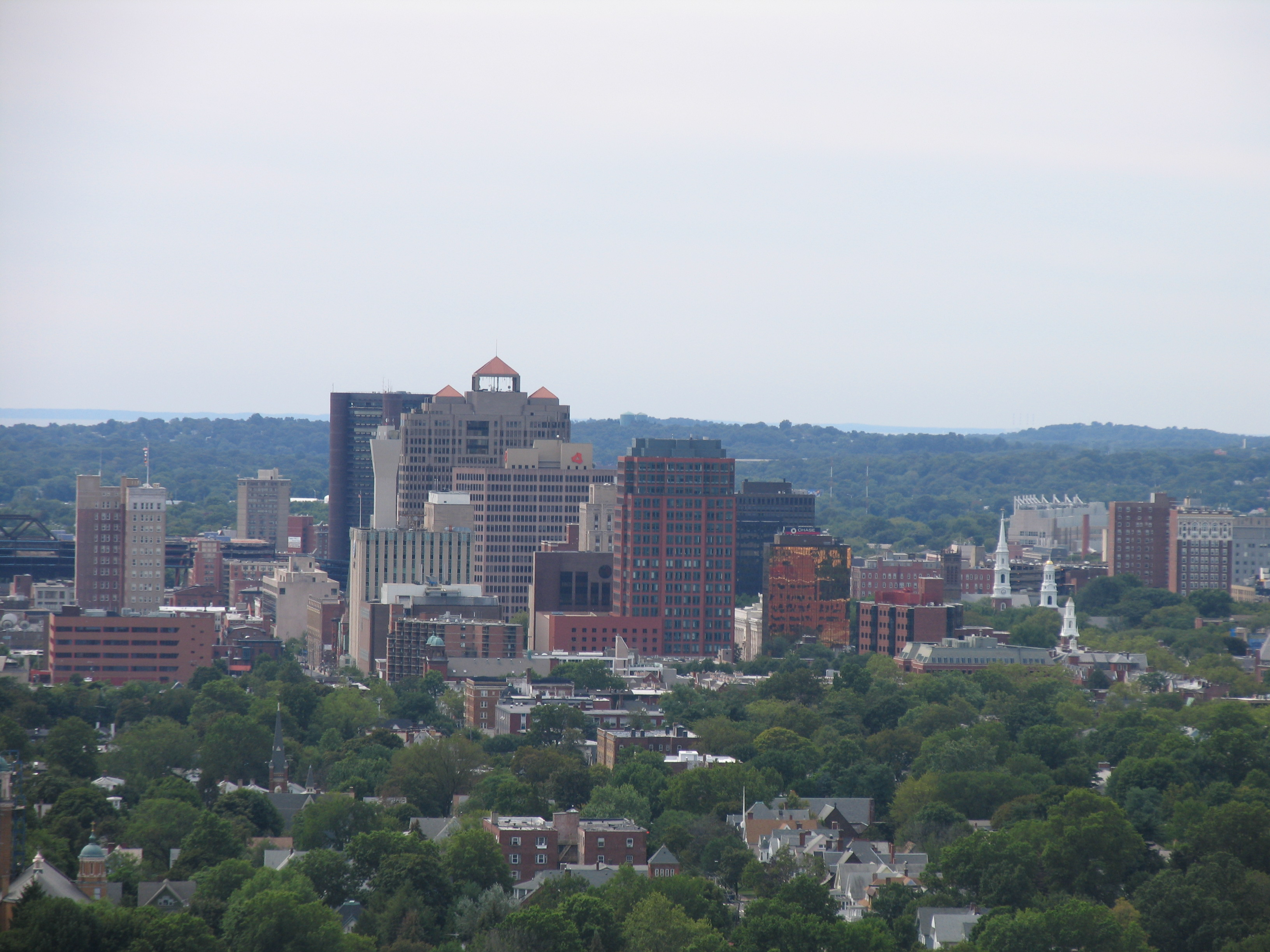
New Haven

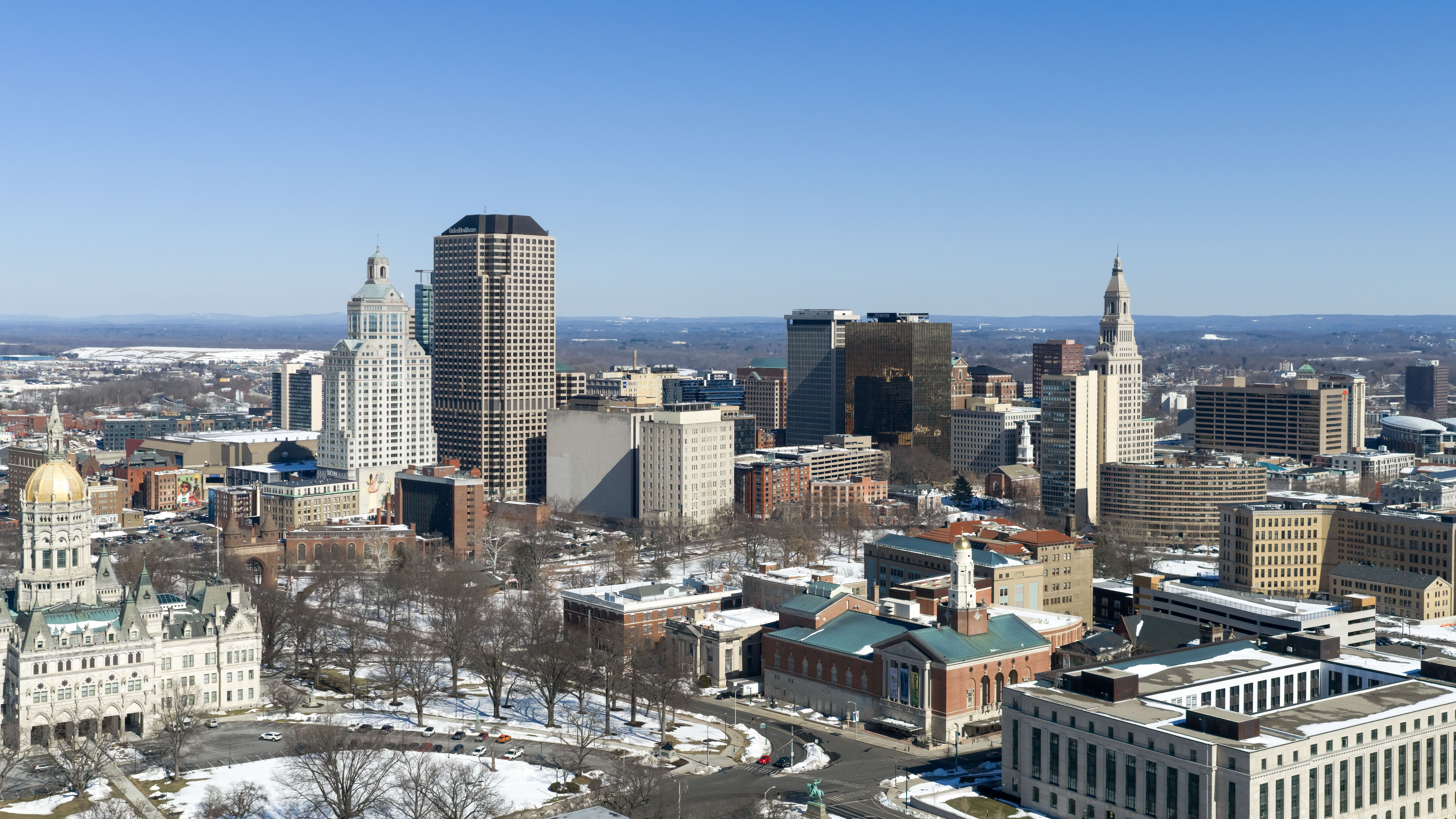
Hartford

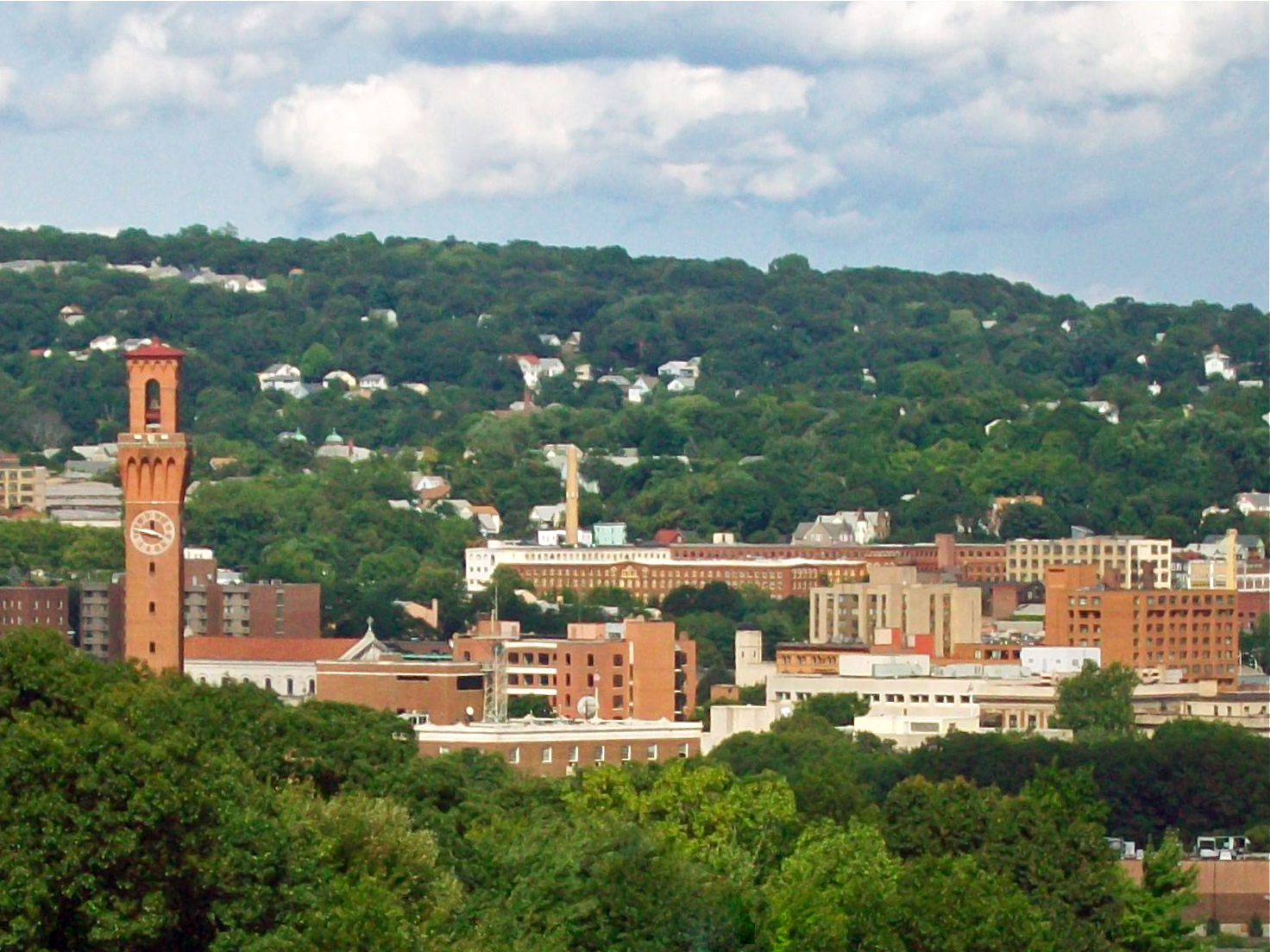
Waterbury

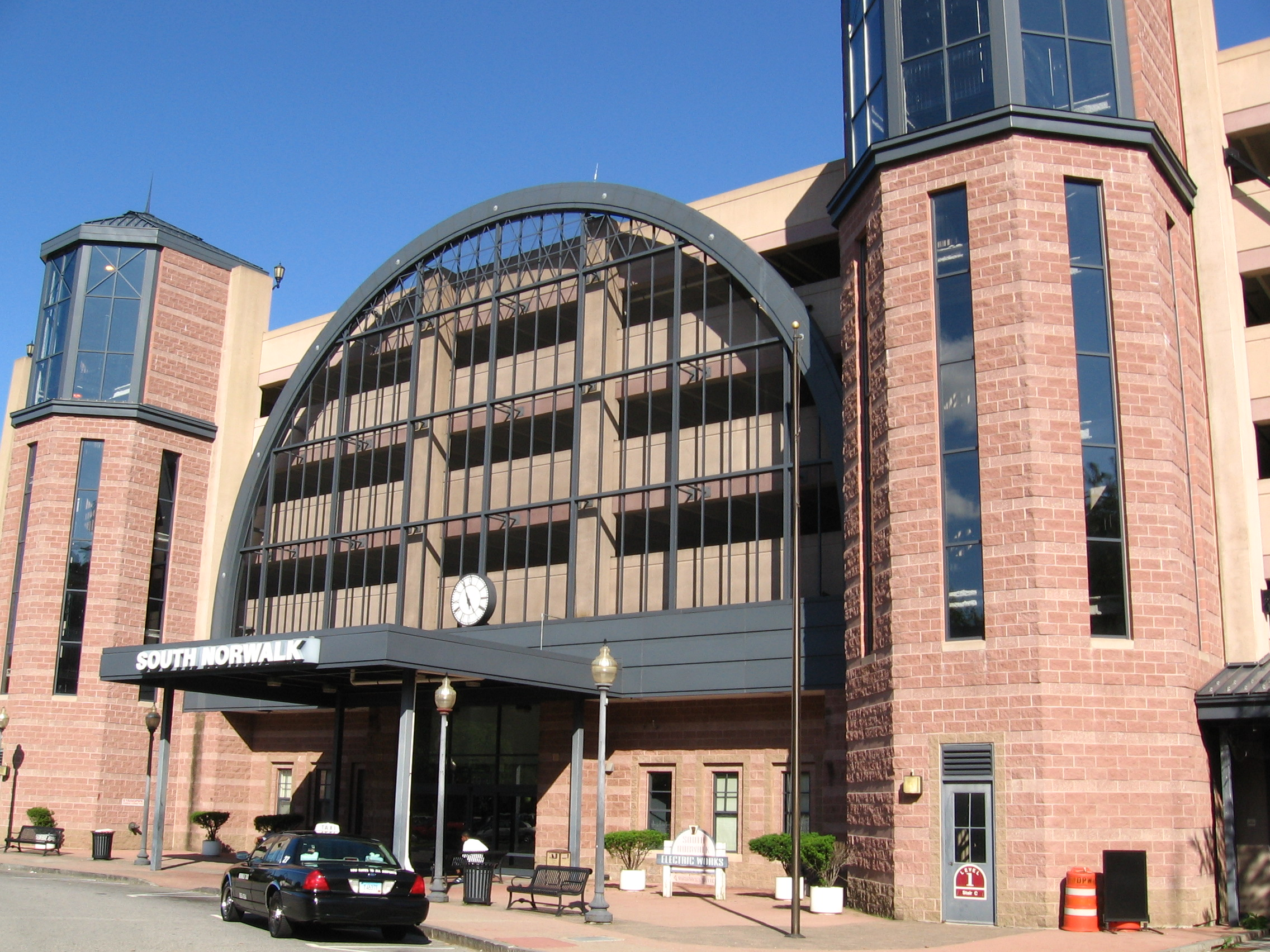
Norwalk

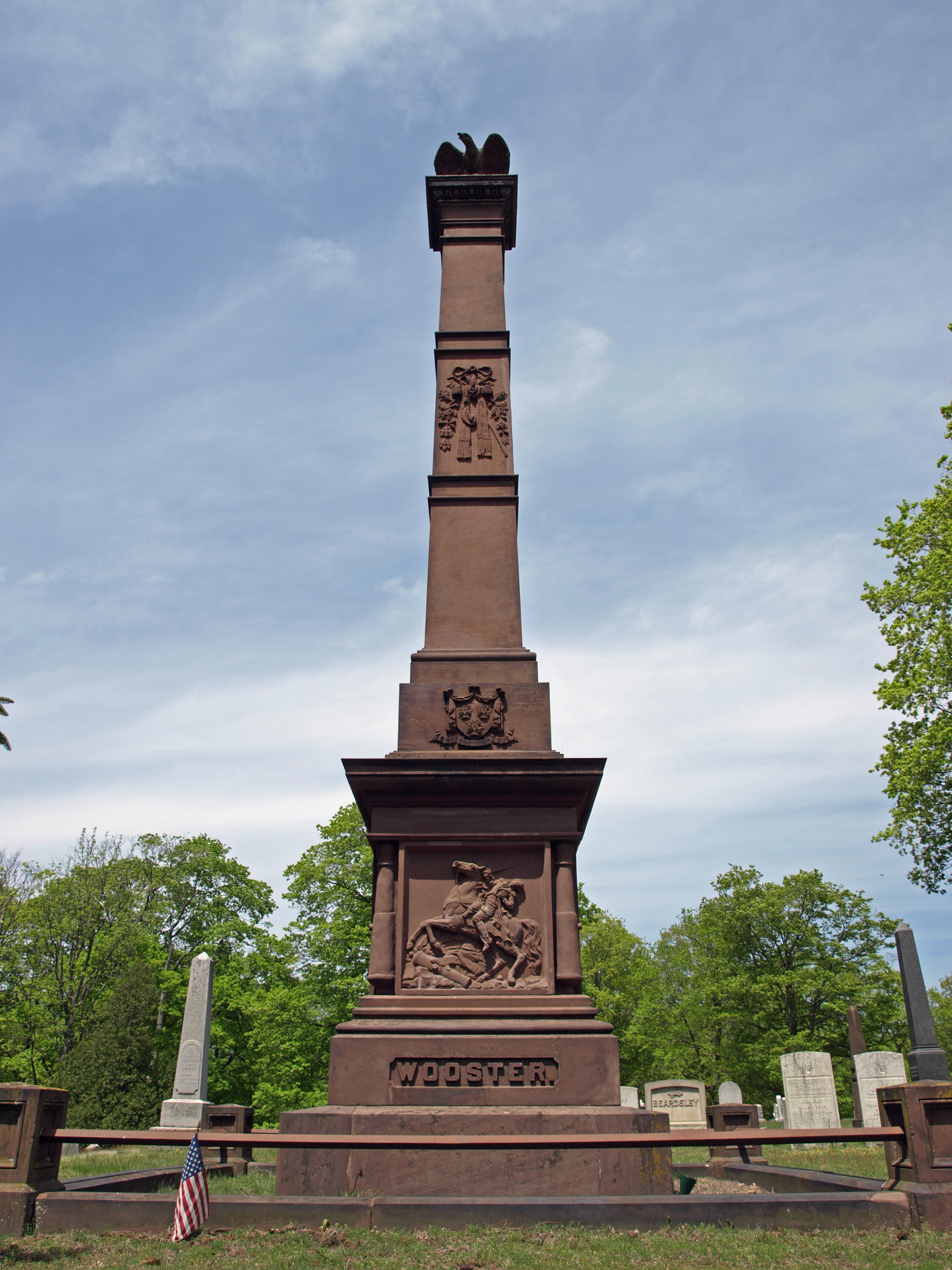
Danbury

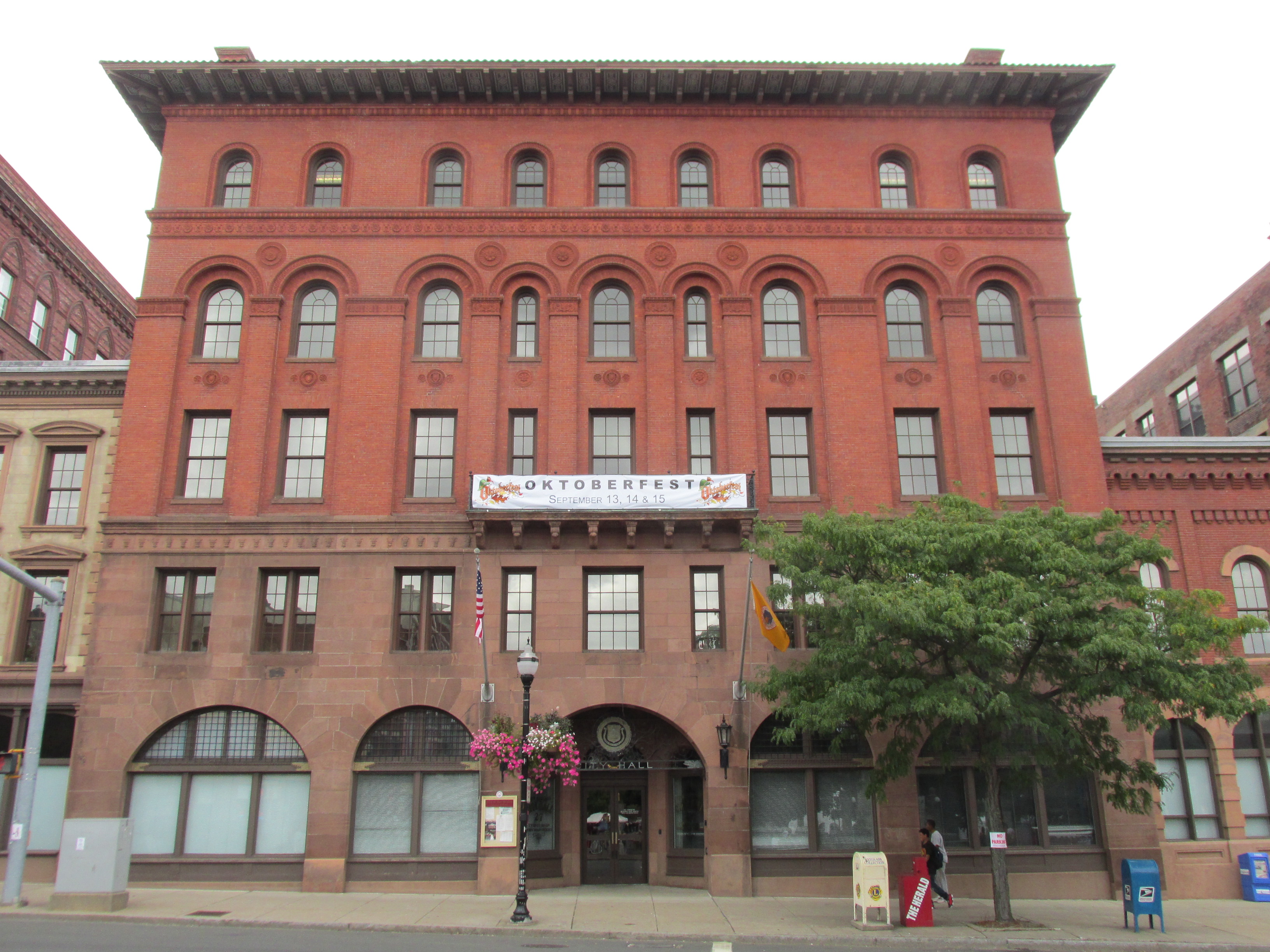
New Britain

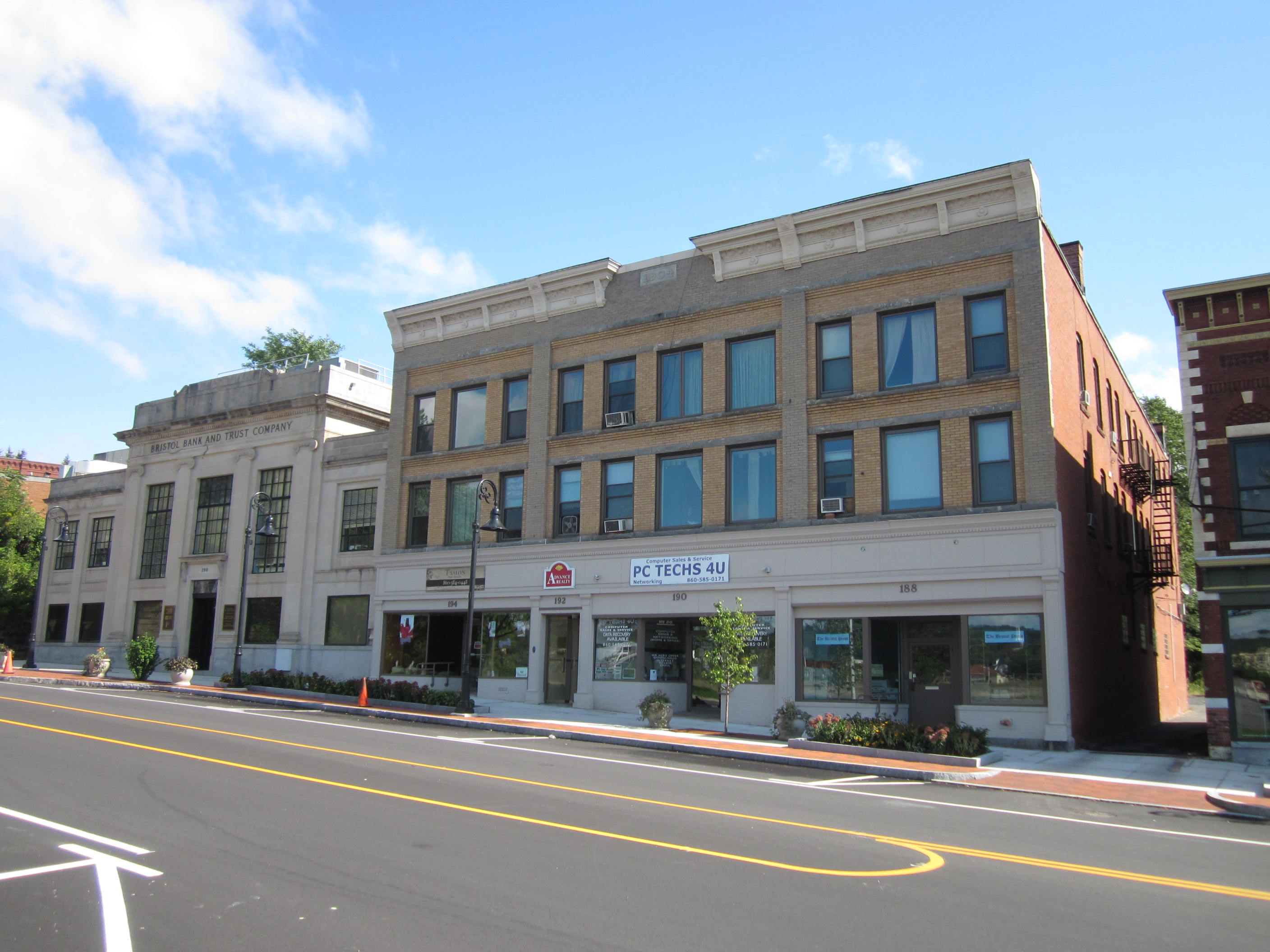
Bristol

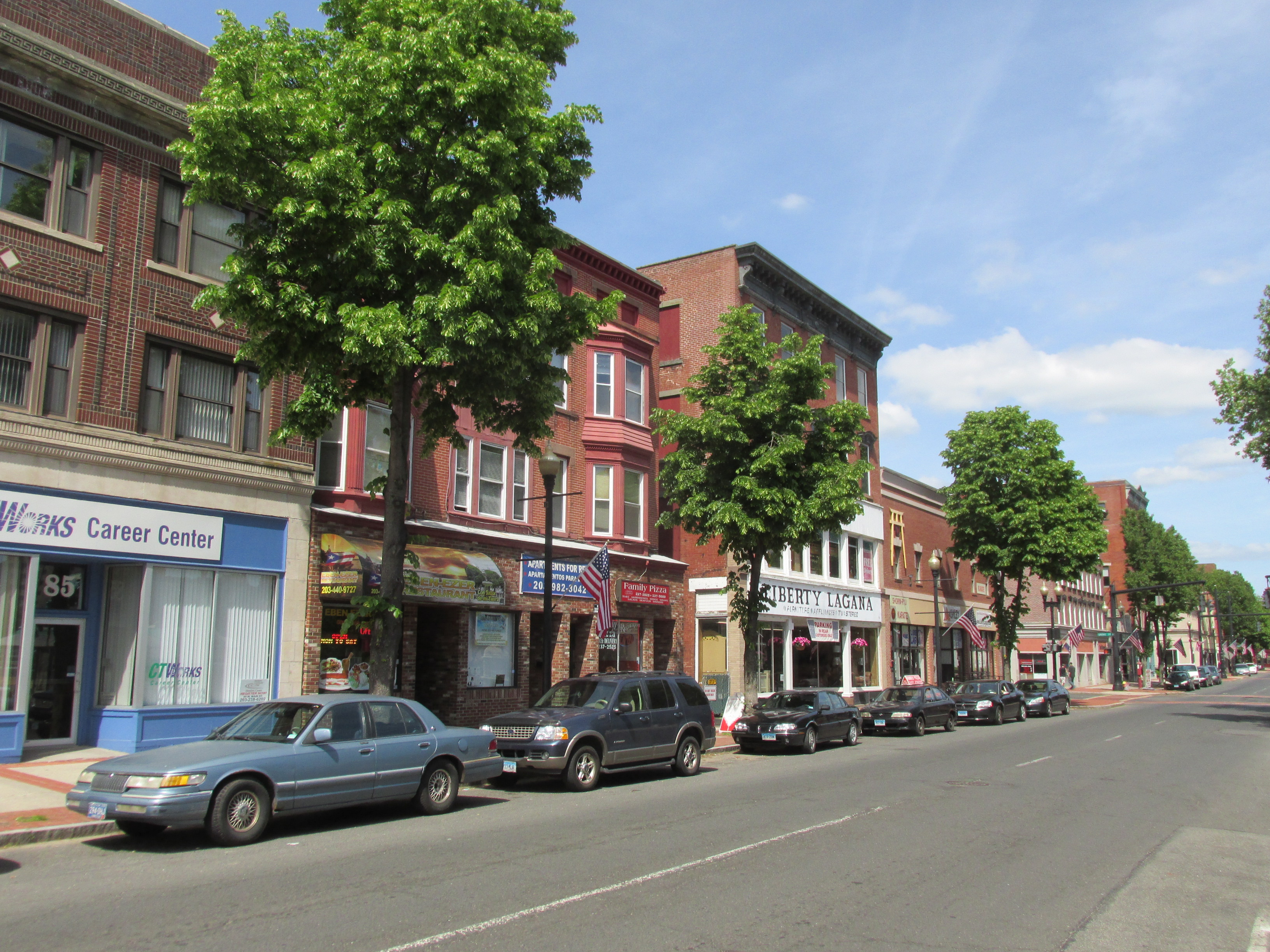
Meriden

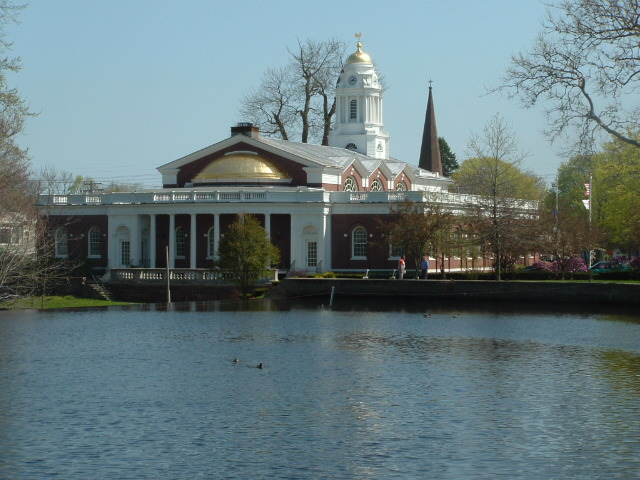
Milford

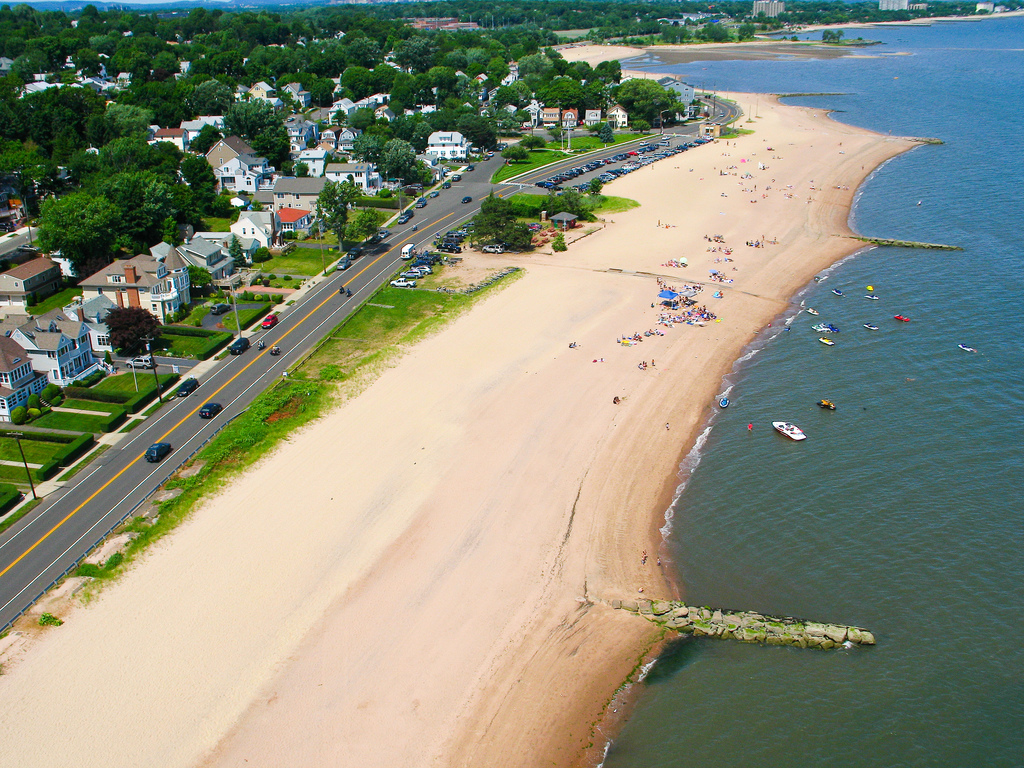
West Haven

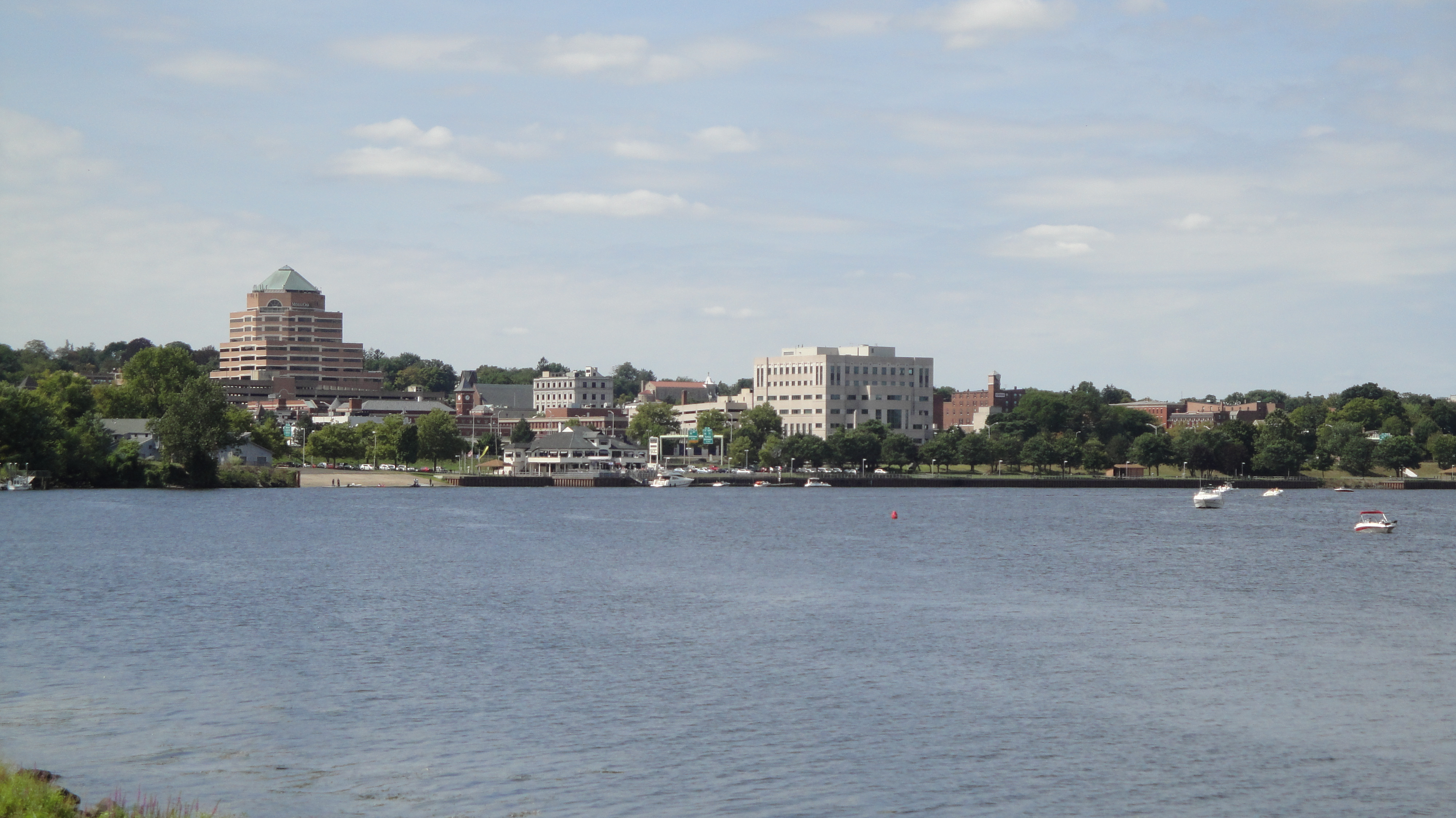
Middletown

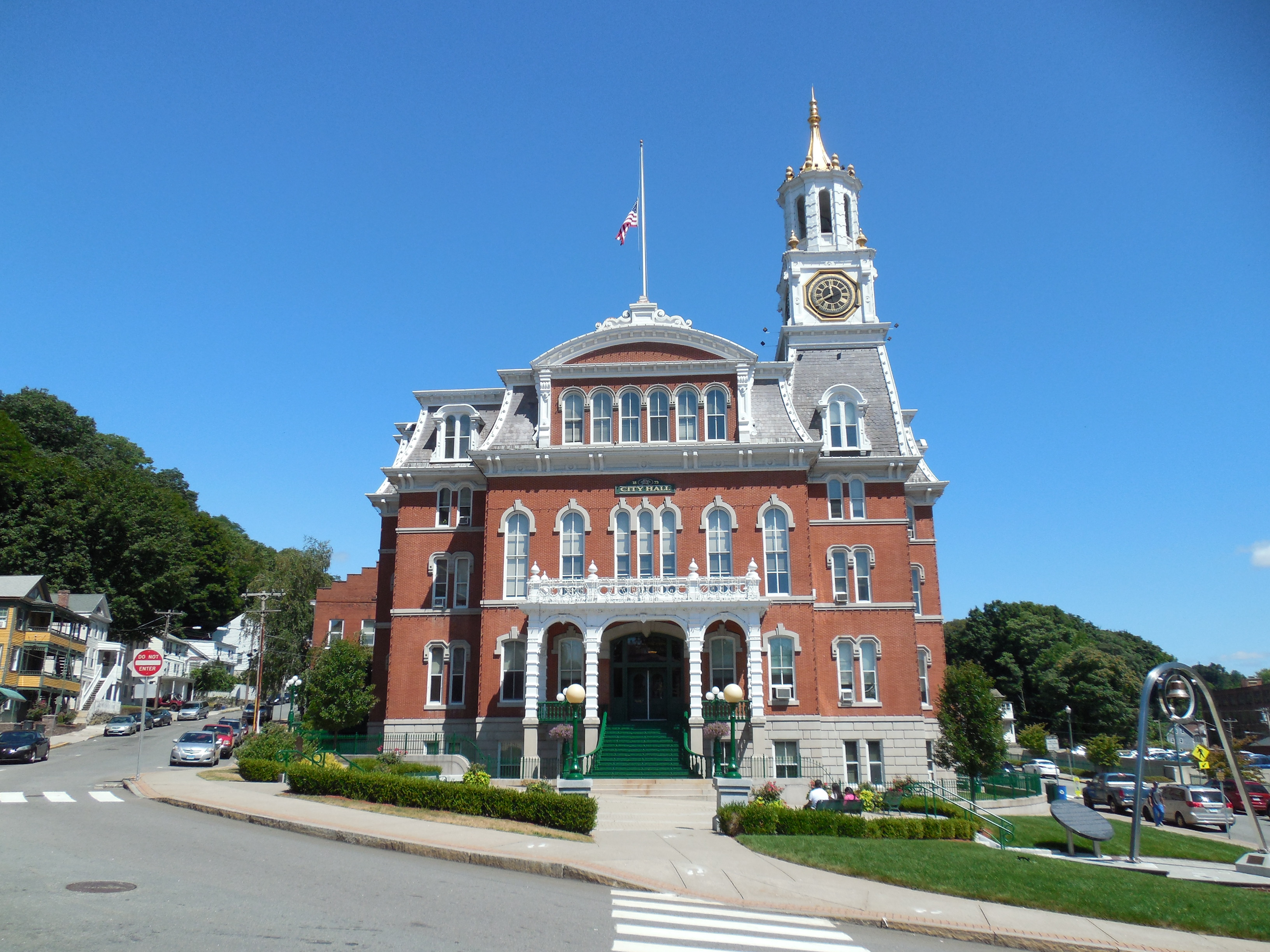
Norwich

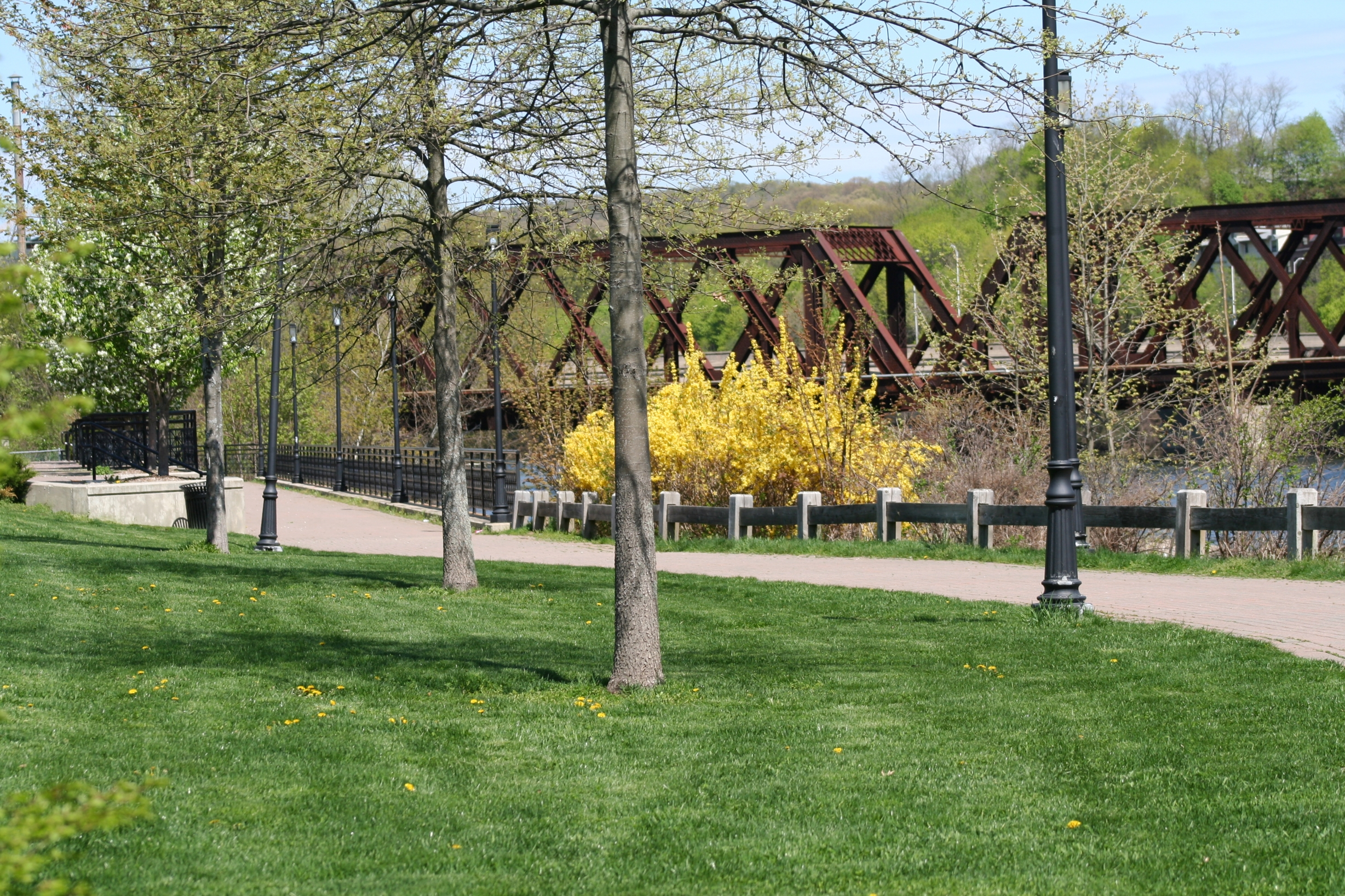
Shelton

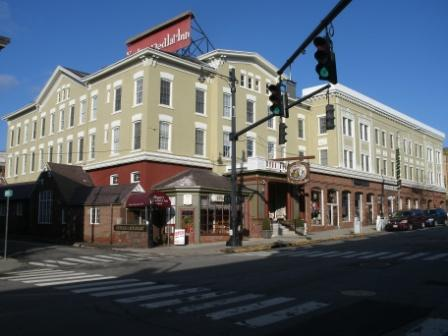
Torrington

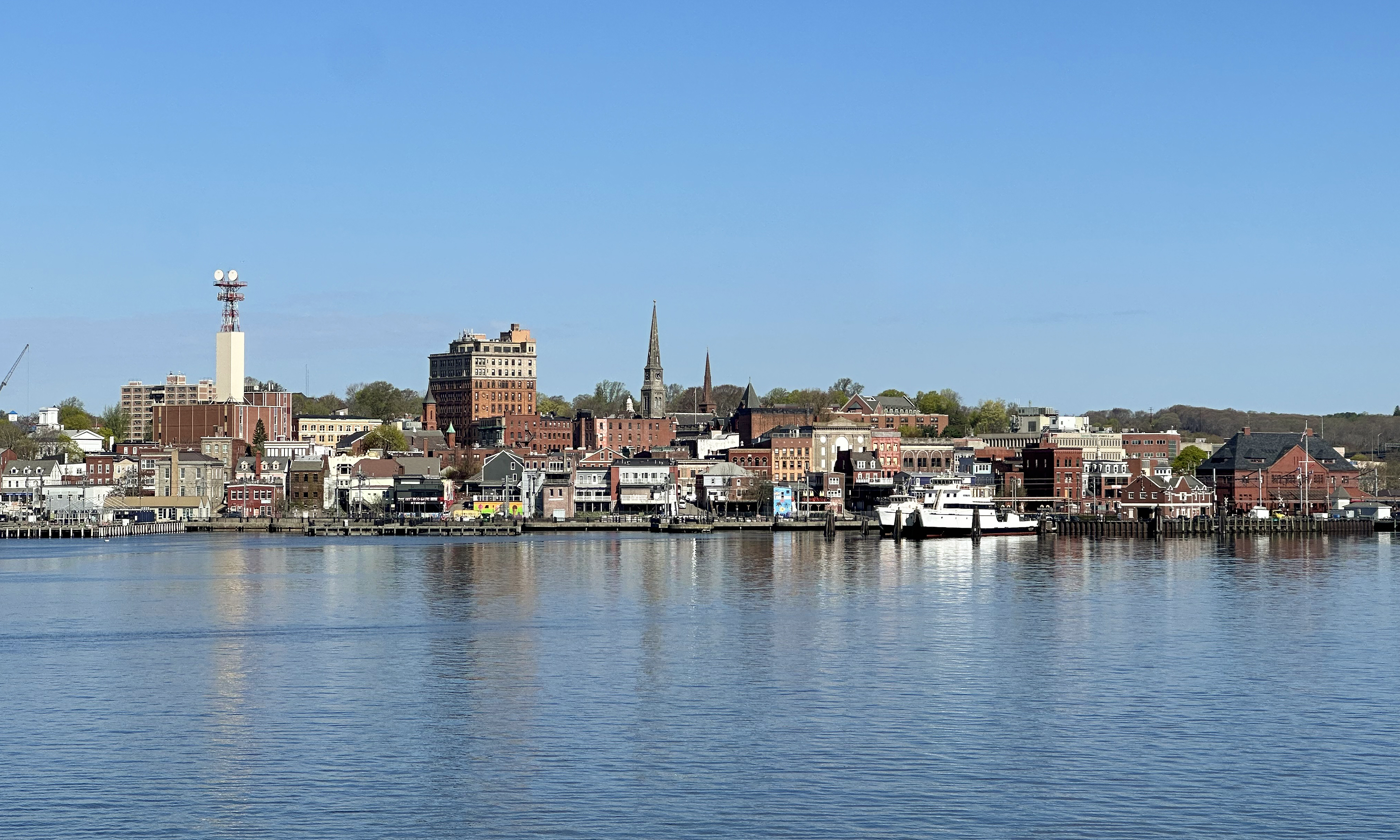
New London

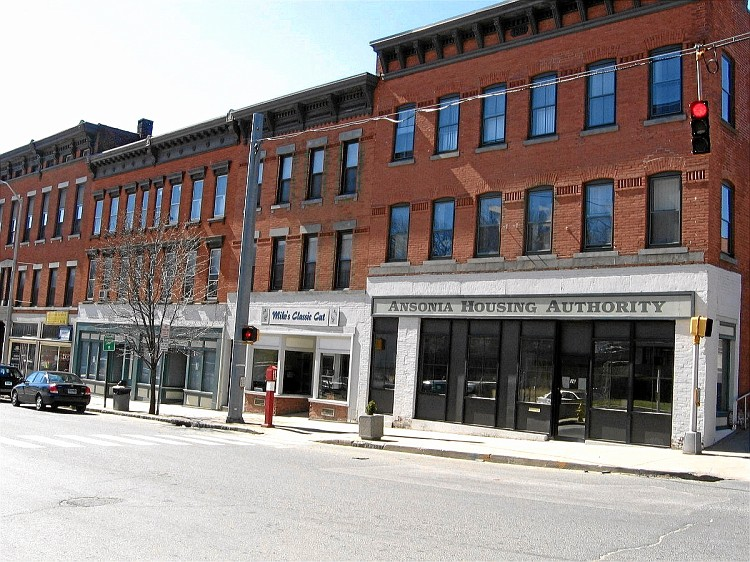
Ansonia

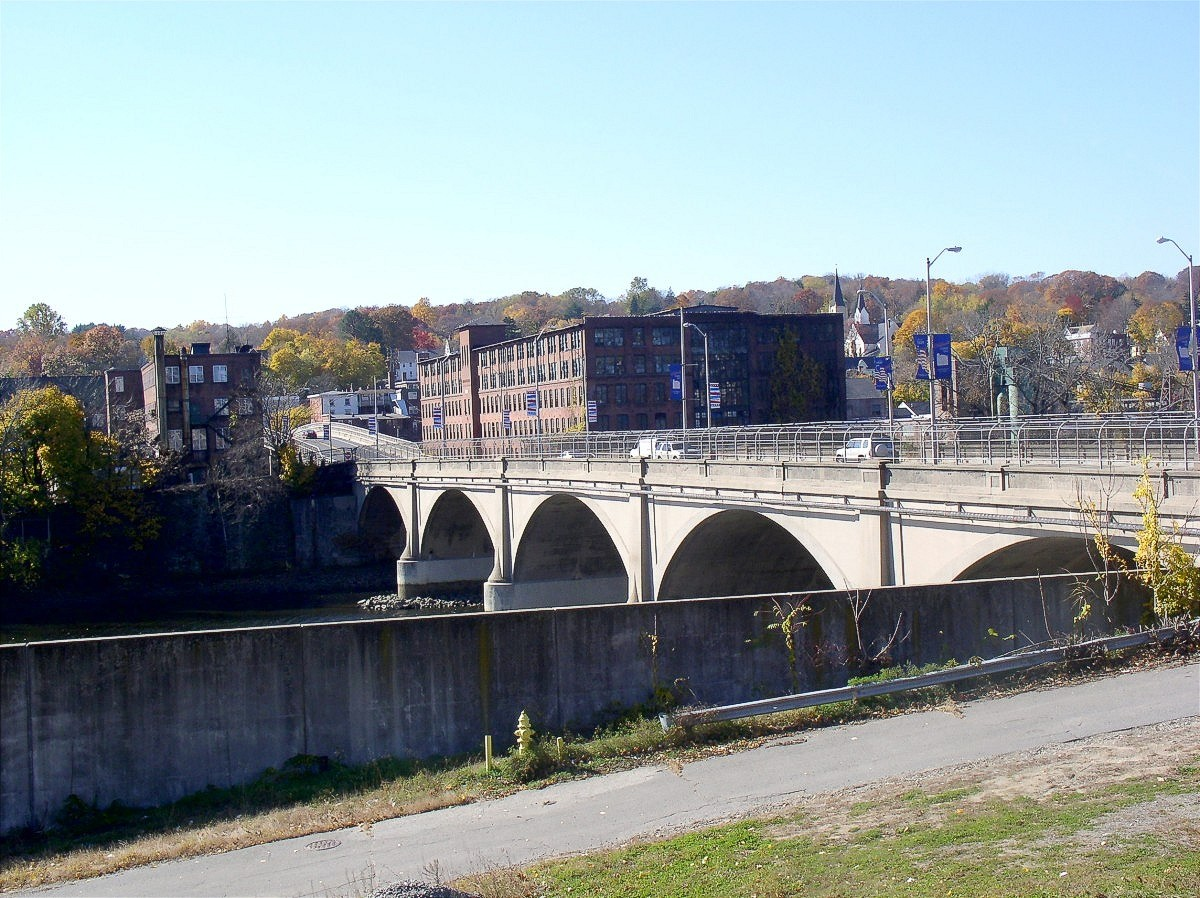
Derby

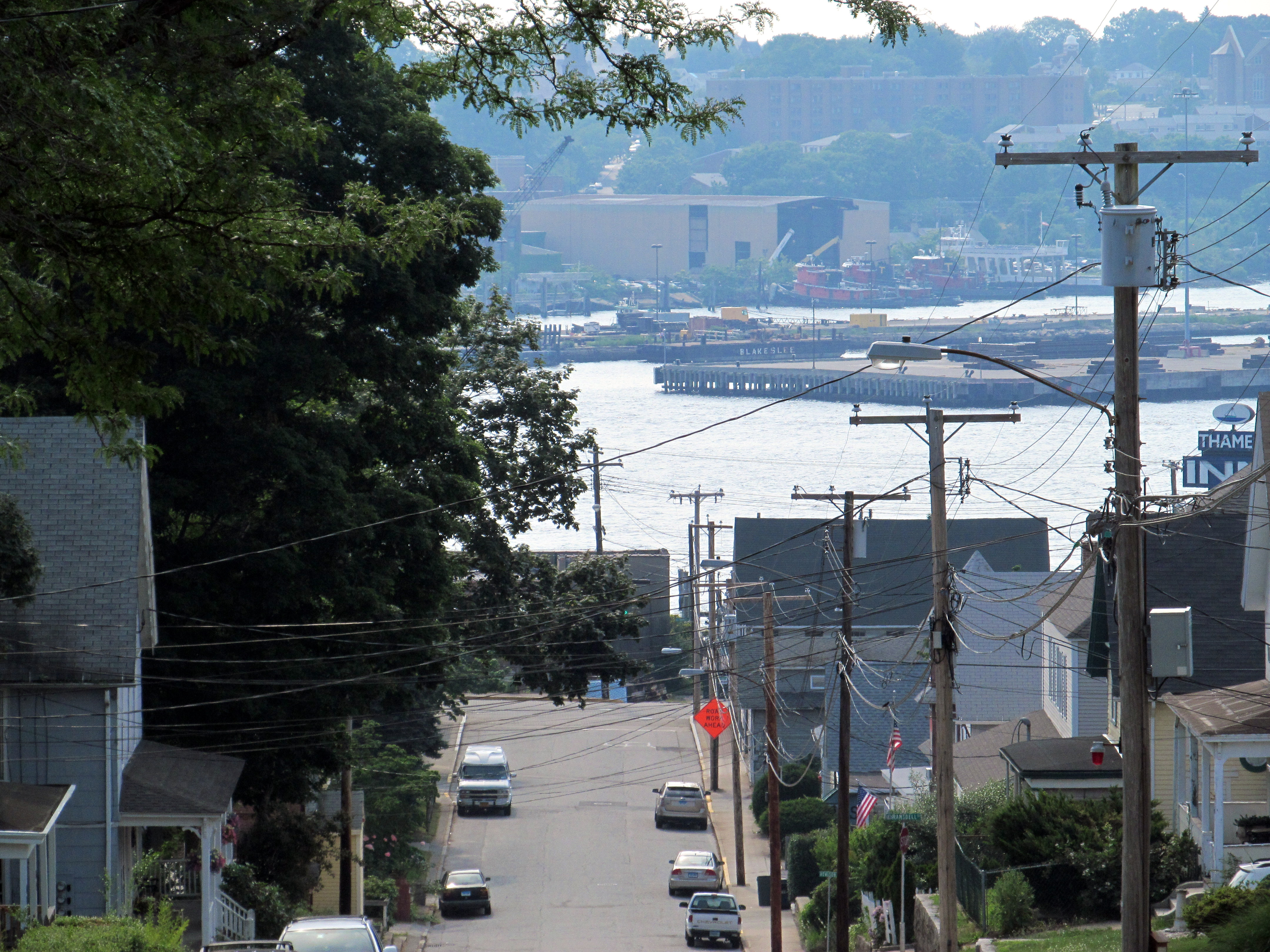
Groton

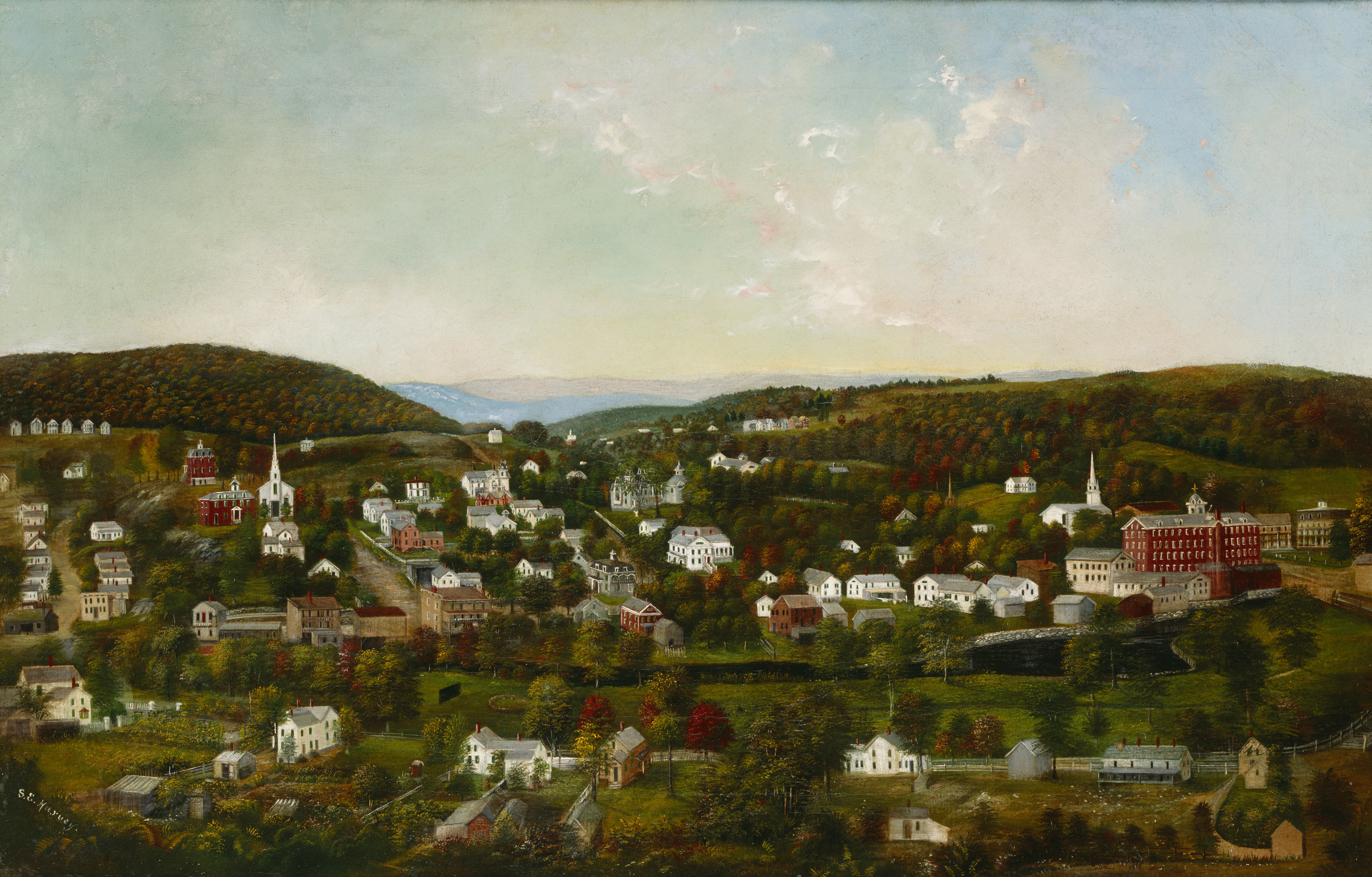
Winsted

== Boroughs ==
Name	Parent town	Population (2020)	Area (2020)		Coordinates
Name	Parent town	Population (2020)	sq mi	km^{2}	Coordinates
Bantam	Litchfield	720	1.01	2.6	41°43′24″N 73°14′26″W
Danielson	Killingly	4,155	1.16	3.0	41°48′29″N 71°53′03″W
Fenwick	Old Saybrook	53	0.39	1.0	41°16′12″N 72°21′26″W
Groton Long Point	Groton	530	0.4	1.0	41°18′52″N 72°00′28″W
Jewett City	Griswold	3,328	0.74	1.9	41°36′26″N 71°58′47″W
Litchfield	Litchfield	1,179	1.37	3.5	41°44′51″N 73°11′17″W
Naugatuck (Note: Naugatuck is a consolidated borough and town.)		31,519	16.39	42.4	41°29′23″N 73°03′05″W
Newtown	Newtown	1,914	2.3	6.0	41°24′42.82″N 73°18′43.01″W
Stonington	Stonington	976	0.7	1.8	41°20′5.15″N 71°53′58.05″W
Woodmont	Milford	1,486	0.99	2.6	41°13′41″N 72°59′32″W

== See also ==
- Borough (Connecticut)
- Administrative divisions of Connecticut
- Connecticut
- List of counties in Connecticut
- Local government in Connecticut
