= Representative town meeting =

Form of municipal legislature in some American states

A representative town meeting, also called "limited town meeting", is a form of municipal legislature particularly common in Connecticut and Massachusetts, and permitted in Maine, Vermont and New Hampshire.

Representative town meetings function largely the same as open town meetings, except that not all registered voters can participate or vote. The townspeople instead elect town meeting members by precinct to represent them and to vote on the issues for them.

== Connecticut ==
Representative town meetings (RTMs) vary from town to town, and can vary widely in terms of rules and bylaws. The town of Westport, Connecticut, has non-partisan RTMs, where while a member may belong to a party, it may not be advertised as such, and the First Selectman may veto any legislation passed except for appropriations. Wethersfield, Connecticut, however, requires "minority representation" so that no one party can control the RTM. Groton, Connecticut, specifically allows for a valid meeting to take place with no less than half the body present, that the meeting must be open to the public, and that senior town officials such as the town clerk or Superintendent of Schools have all the same rights as members except for voting or raising motions. Greenwich, Connecticut, with a representative town meeting and a Select Board, is the largest town in Connecticut (61,171 population as of 2010 census) with a town meeting / Select Board style of government.

== Maine ==
As of January 1, 2013, when Sanford re-incorporated as a city and eliminated its representative town meetings, no Maine cities or towns operate under a representative town meeting form of government. Open town meeting remains the most common form of local government, dominating in the 431 towns and 34 plantations, while the council–manager form dominates in the 23 cities.

== Massachusetts ==
Alfred Chandler of Brookline introduced the idea of limited or representative town government as early as 1897, but it was not adopted until 1915, when Brookline accepted an act of the Massachusetts legislature providing for "precinct voting, limited town meeting, town meeting members, a referendum, and an annual moderator in the Town of Brookline." Newport, Rhode Island, influenced by Chandler, had adopted a form of representative town meeting in 1906. Representative or "Limited" Town Meeting consists of Town Meeting members elected from election districts or precincts and Members-at-Large. Representative Town Meetings may be chosen by a town through a special act of the state legislature, by petitioning the General Court to enact special legislation which applies solely to that town, or by using the Home Rule Charter process.

== New Hampshire ==
NH RSA 49-D-3 III. provides for representative town meeting, though no town has adopted this form of government. The representative town meeting is similar to that of the town council form of government, which acts under a charter and is the legislative and governing board of the town, but has different requirements for their respective charters.

The representative town meeting follows the procedures of a regular town meeting, and has the authority to address all matters that can be legally addressed at the annual or a special town meeting. Matters that the law or charter states must be placed on the official ballot of the town, cannot be decided by the representative meeting. To have a representative town meeting, the town must approve a charter that includes the following:

- the manner of district representation
- the manner of filling vacancies
- powers of nomination, appointment, and confirmation
- requirements for attendance and quorum
- any domicile or eligibility requirements of up to one year in the town or district and continued domicile during term
- specific procedures for the preparation, presentation, public hearing, and adoption of annual budgets and designation of a fiscal year
- an annual municipal election date pursuant to RSA 669:1
- bonding of certain town officials and employees where not required by general law
- requirements for periodic independent audits of all town financial matters by a certified public accountant.

Elected town officials, such as the board of selectmen, town clerk, and chairman of the town budget committee, are members-at-large.

== See also ==
- Town or city council: Representative legislature for a town or city
- Board of selectmen: Executive council of a town
