= Greater Bridgeport Planning Region, Connecticut =

Connecticut Metropolitan Council of Governments (MetroCOG)
- Planning region
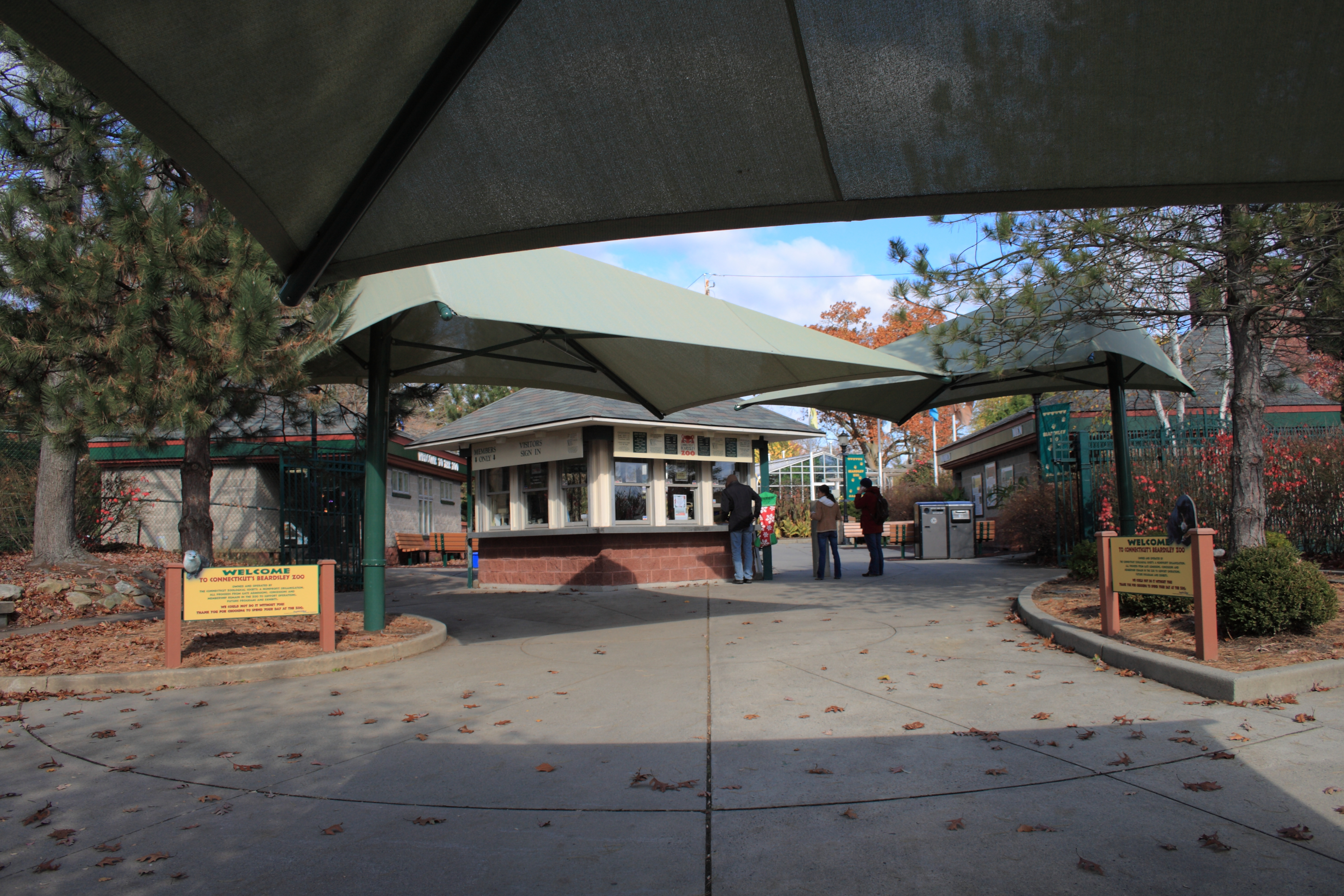
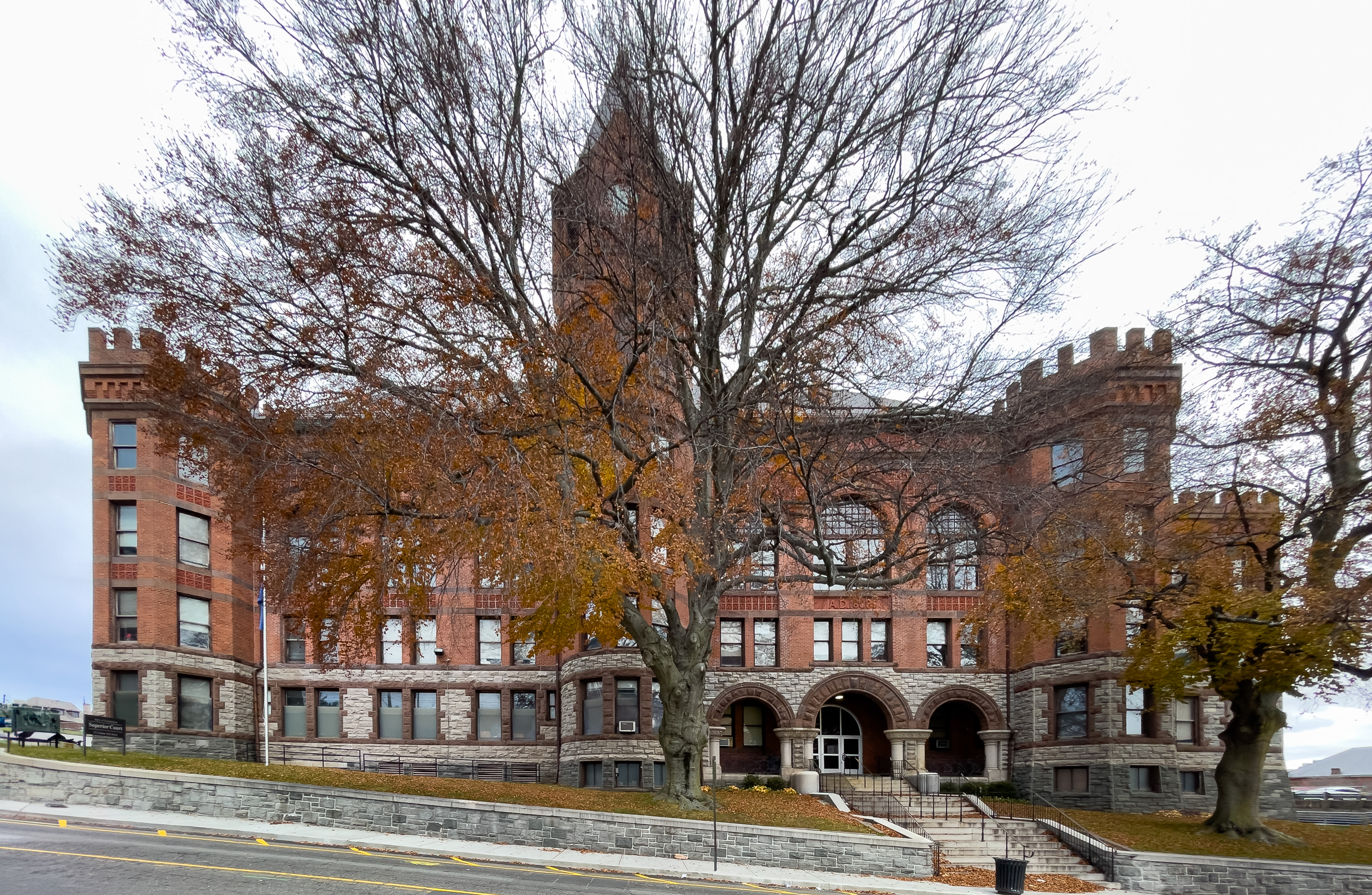
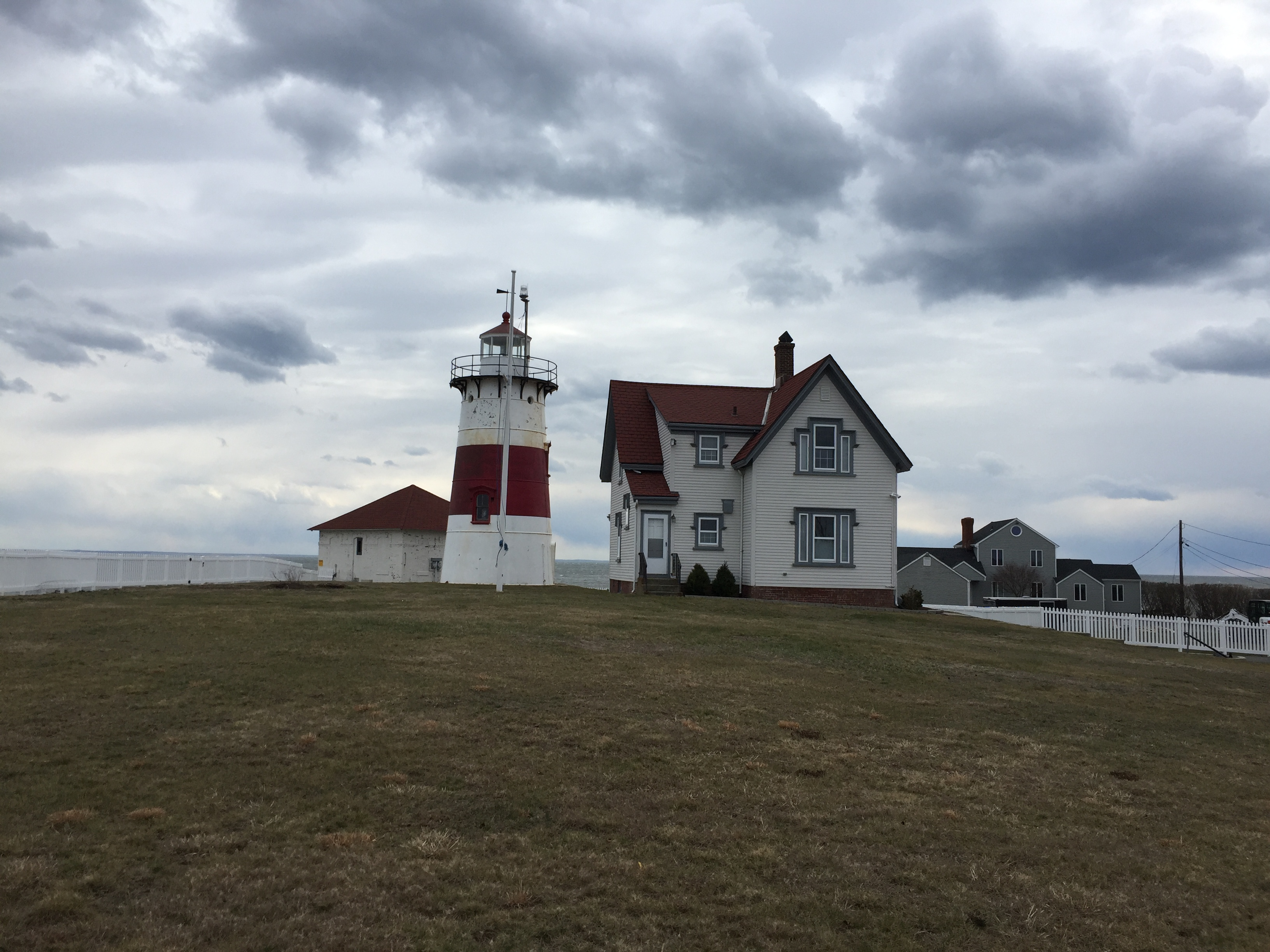
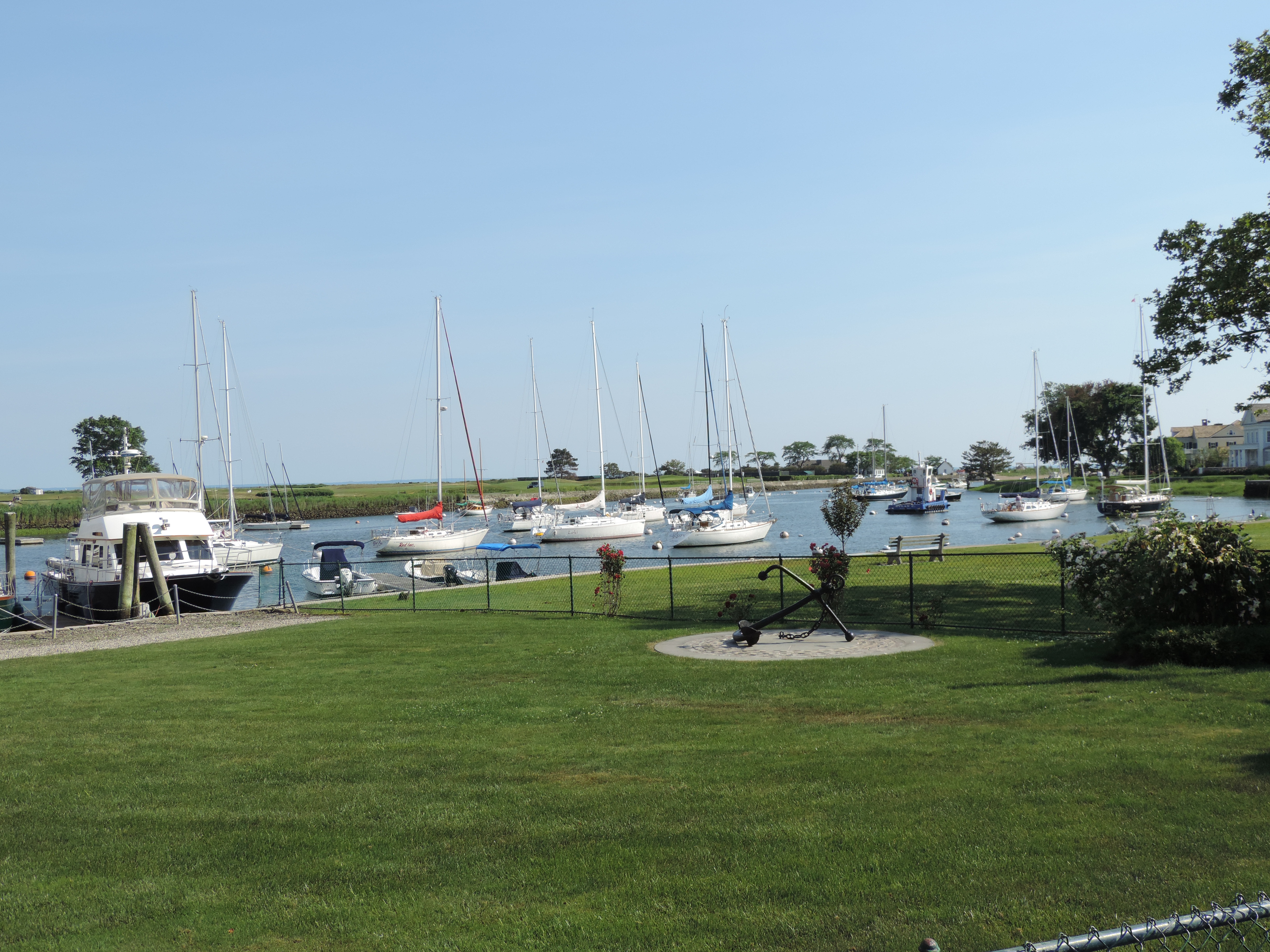
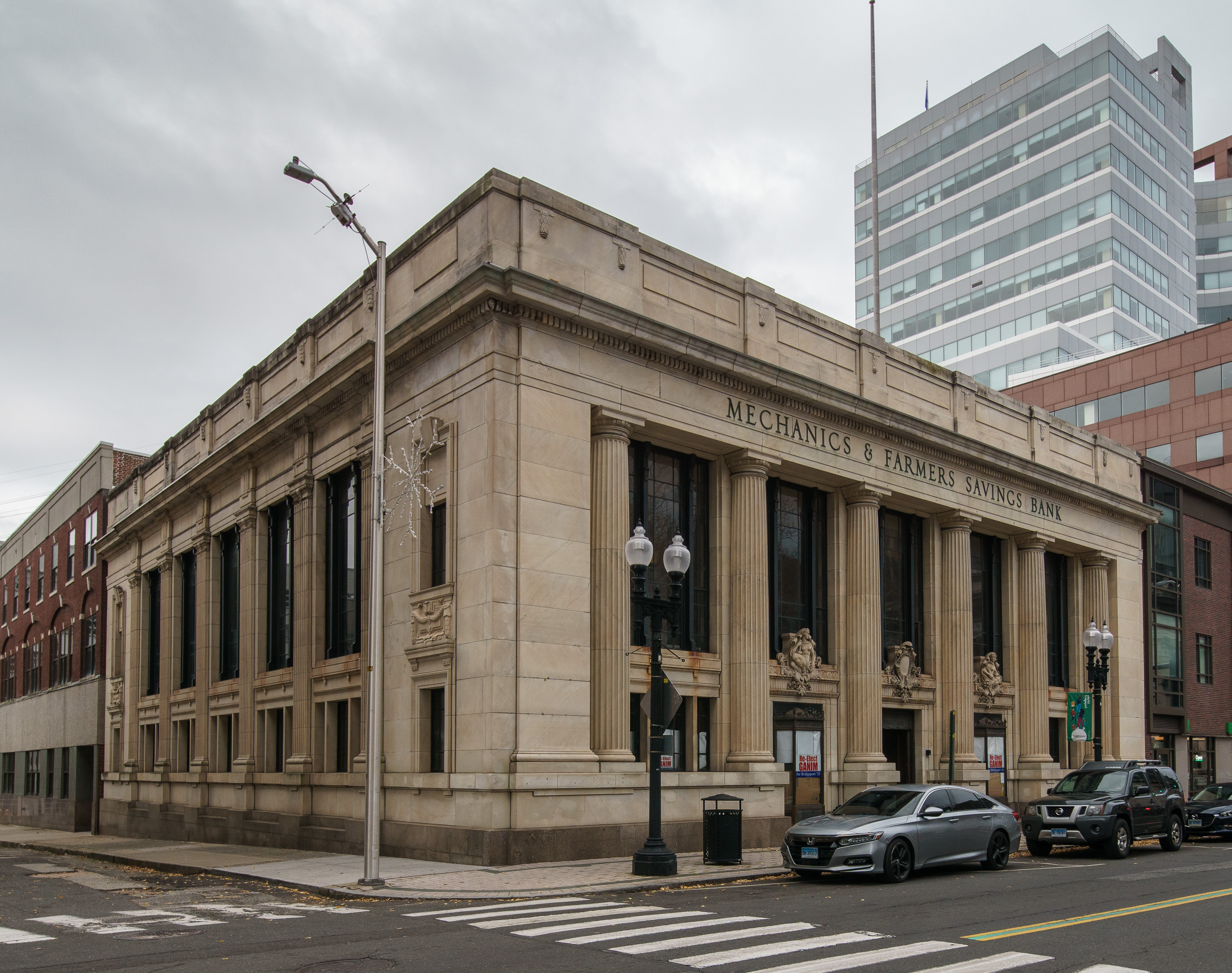
- From top left: Beardsley Zoo, Fairfield County Courthouse in Bridgeport, Stratford Point Light, Southport Harbor, Bridgeport Downtown South Historic District

- Logo

- Location within the U.S. state of Connecticut
- Coordinates: 41°11′N 73°11′W
- Country: United States
- State: Connecticut
- Founded: 2013
- Largest city: Bridgeport

Government
  - Executive Director: Matthew Fulda

Area
  - Total: 140.2 sq mi (363 km^{2})

Population (2020)
  - Total: 325,778
  - Estimate (2025): 337,697 ▲
  - Density: 2,324/sq mi (897.2/km^{2})
- Time zone: UTC−5 (Eastern)
  - Summer (DST): UTC−4 (EDT)
- Congressional districts: 3rd, 4th
- Website: ctmetro.org

Interactive map of the Greater Bridgeport Planning Region

The Greater Bridgeport Planning Region is a planning region and county-equivalent in the U.S. state of Connecticut. It is served by the coterminous Connecticut Metropolitan Council of Governments (MetroCOG). In 2022, planning regions were approved to replace Connecticut's counties as county-equivalents for statistical purposes, with full implementation occurring by 2024.

== MetroCOG policies and activities ==
MetroCOG is a council of governments and a regional planning organization serving Bridgeport, Fairfield, Easton, Monroe, Stratford, and Trumbull. It regulates economic development, transportation, and environmental quality in the region. MetroCOG also serves as a "host agency" for the Greater Bridgeport and Valley Metropolitan Planning Organization. Mike Tetreau, a Fairfield First Selectman, has served as Executive Director since 2018. The headquarters of MetroCOG is located at 1000 Lafayette Blvd. in Bridgeport.

As of 2018, MetroCOG is looking into initiating a bike-sharing system that would service Bridgeport, Fairfield and Stratford and perhaps Trumbull, Monroe and Easton.

Another priority of the council was to gain a "county government equivalence designation" from the United States Census in order to be able to apply for many federal programs as since 1960, Connecticut has no county governments. This change was made official by the U.S. Census Bureau in 2022.

In 2017 the council worked to secure a $2,050,000 state grant to improve the Pequonnock River trail.

== Demographics ==
Historical population
Census	Pop.	Note	%±
1800	1,291		—
1810	2,330		80.5%
1820	10,321		343.0%
1830	12,762		23.7%
1840	12,009		−5.9%
1850	17,397		44.9%
1860	24,178		39.0%
1870	31,495		30.3%
1880	39,267		24.7%
1890	58,790		49.7%
1900	82,732		40.7%
1910	117,596		42.1%
1920	172,152		46.4%
1930	189,004		9.8%
1940	199,120		5.4%
1950	236,324		18.7%
1960	278,131		17.7%
1970	311,130		11.9%
1980	300,897		−3.3%
1990	299,708		−0.4%
2000	307,607		2.6%
2010	318,004		3.4%
2020	325,778		2.4%
2025 (est.)	337,697	▲	3.7%
U.S. Decennial Census

As of the 2020 United States census, there were 325,778 people living in the Greater Bridgeport Planning Region.

== Municipalities ==
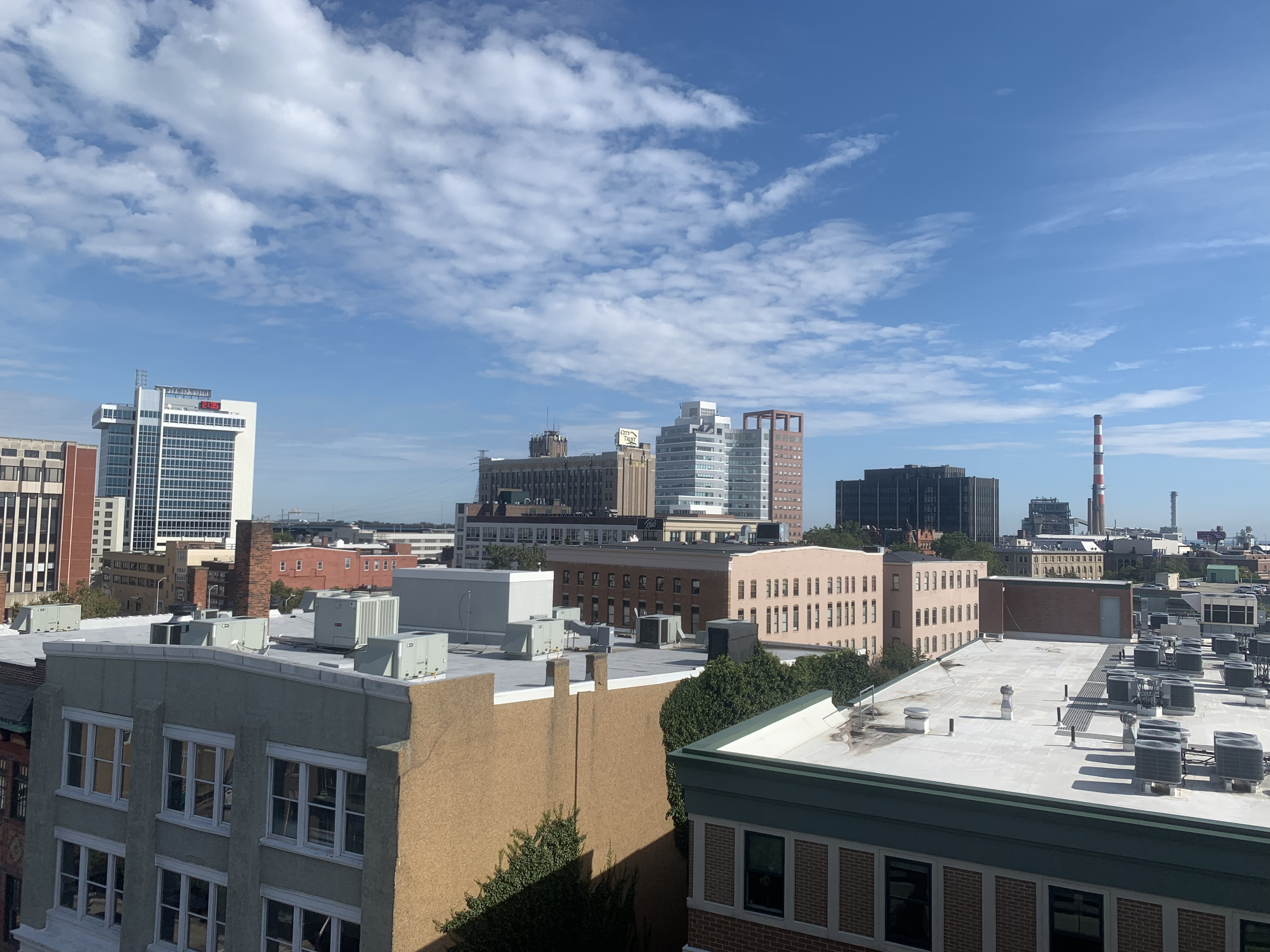
Bridgeport is the largest city within MetroCOG's boundaries

The following municipalities are members of the Greater Bridgeport Region:

- Bridgeport
- Easton
- Fairfield
- Monroe
- Stratford
- Trumbull
