= Northwest Hills Planning Region, Connecticut =

Northwest Hills Council of Governments (NHCOG)
- Planning region
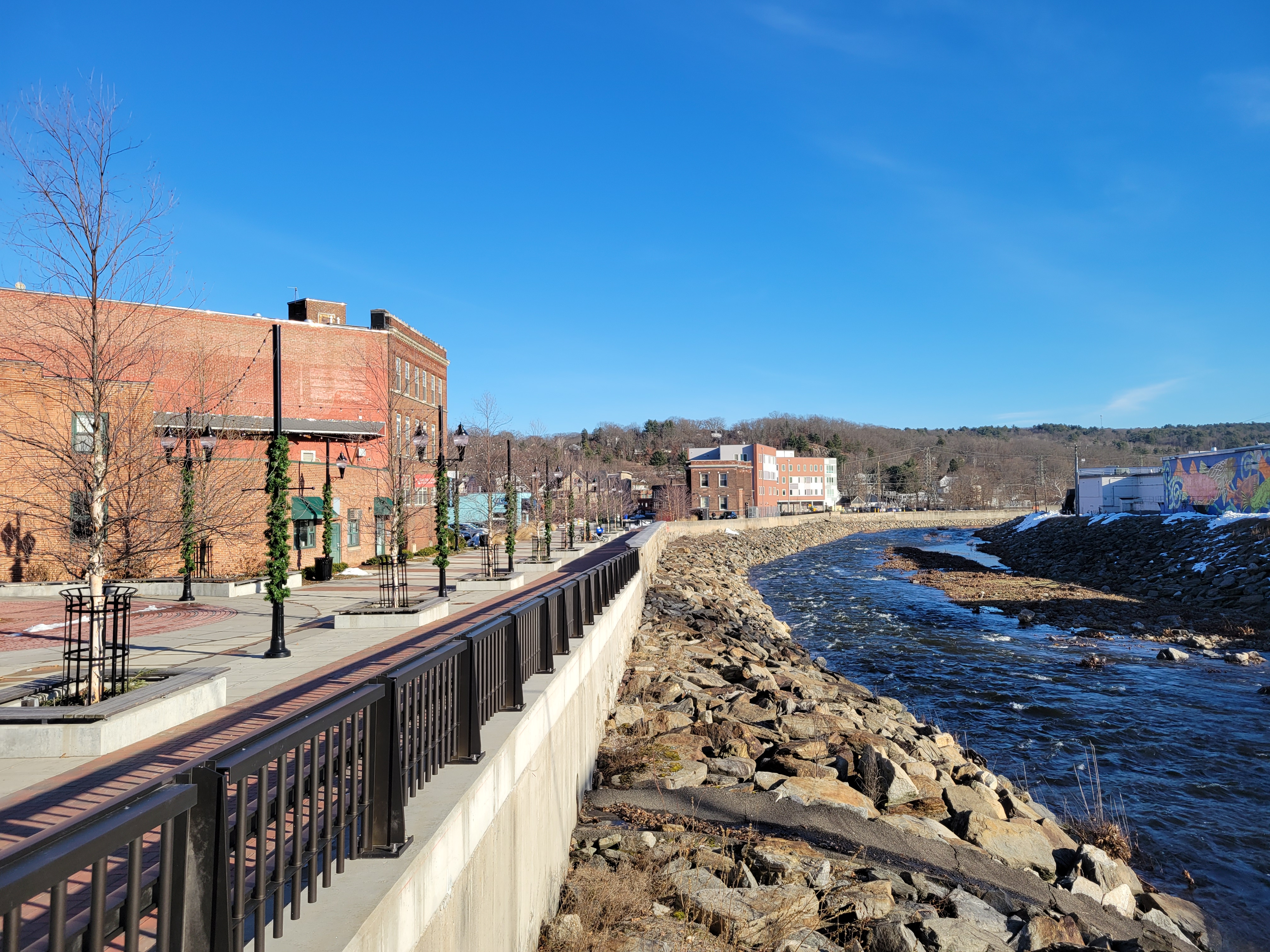
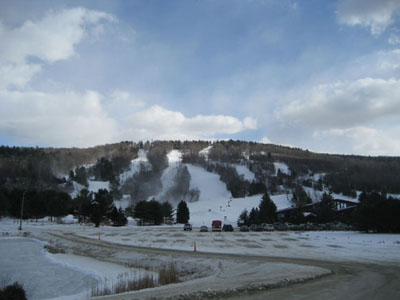
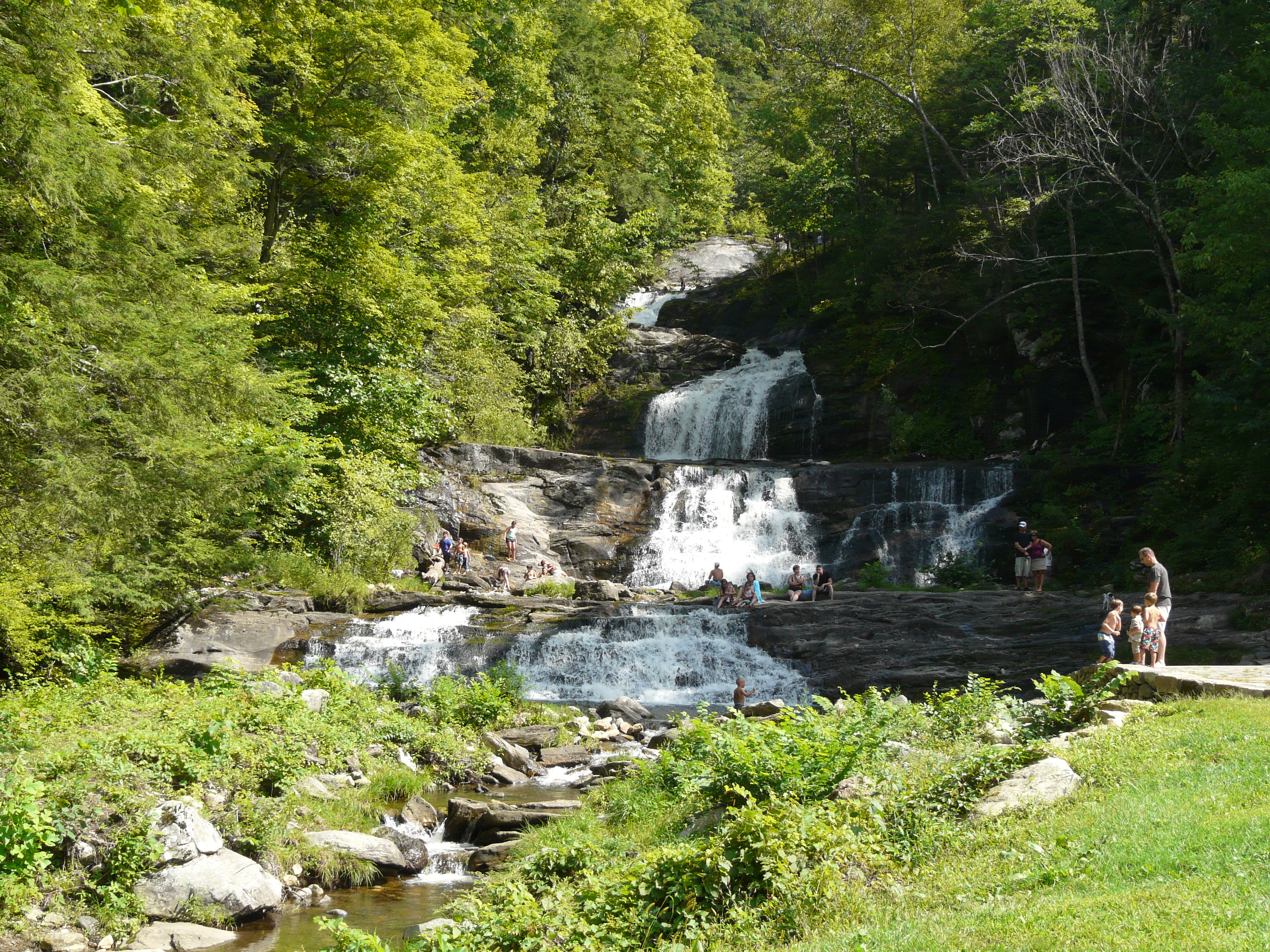
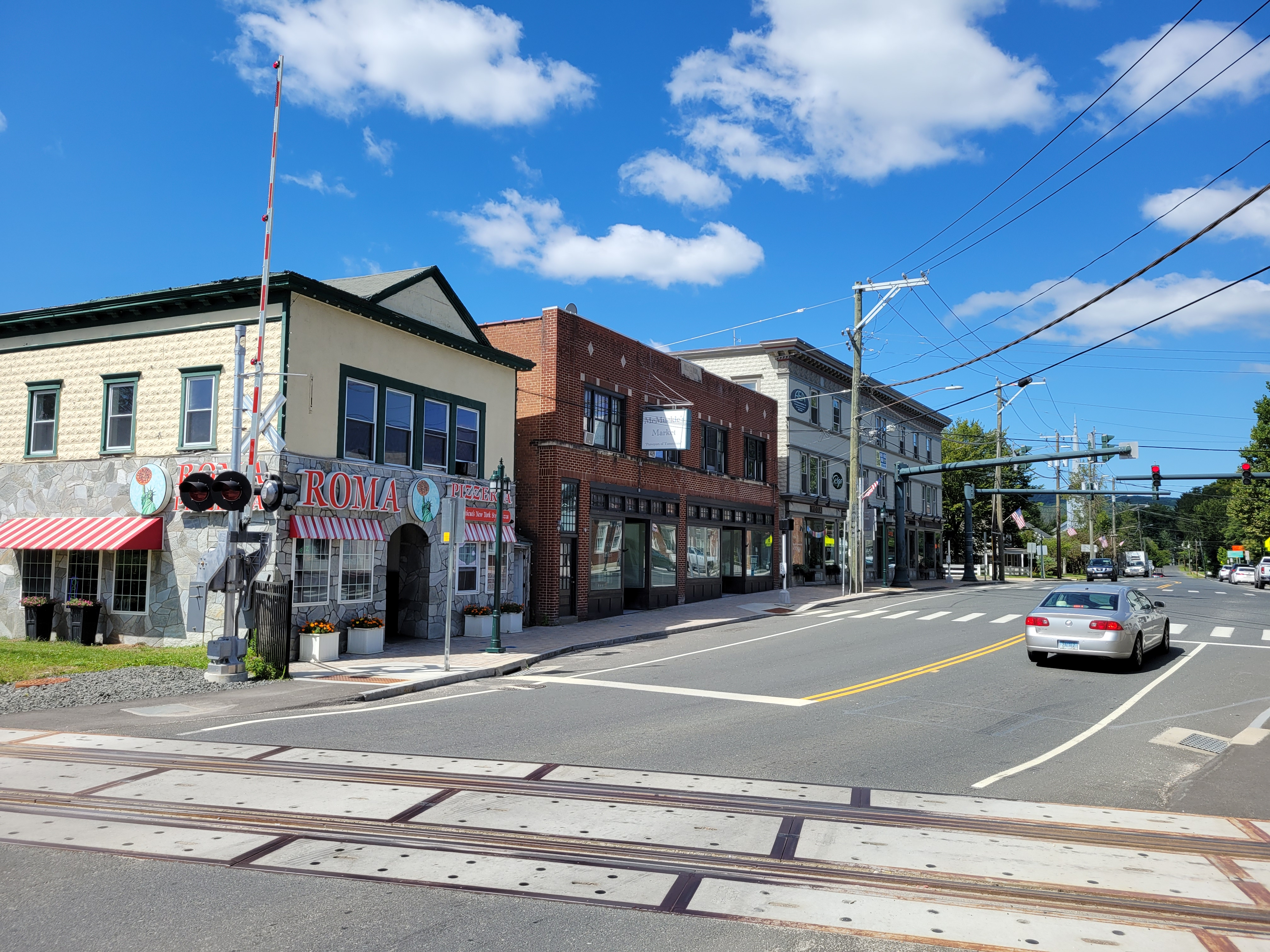
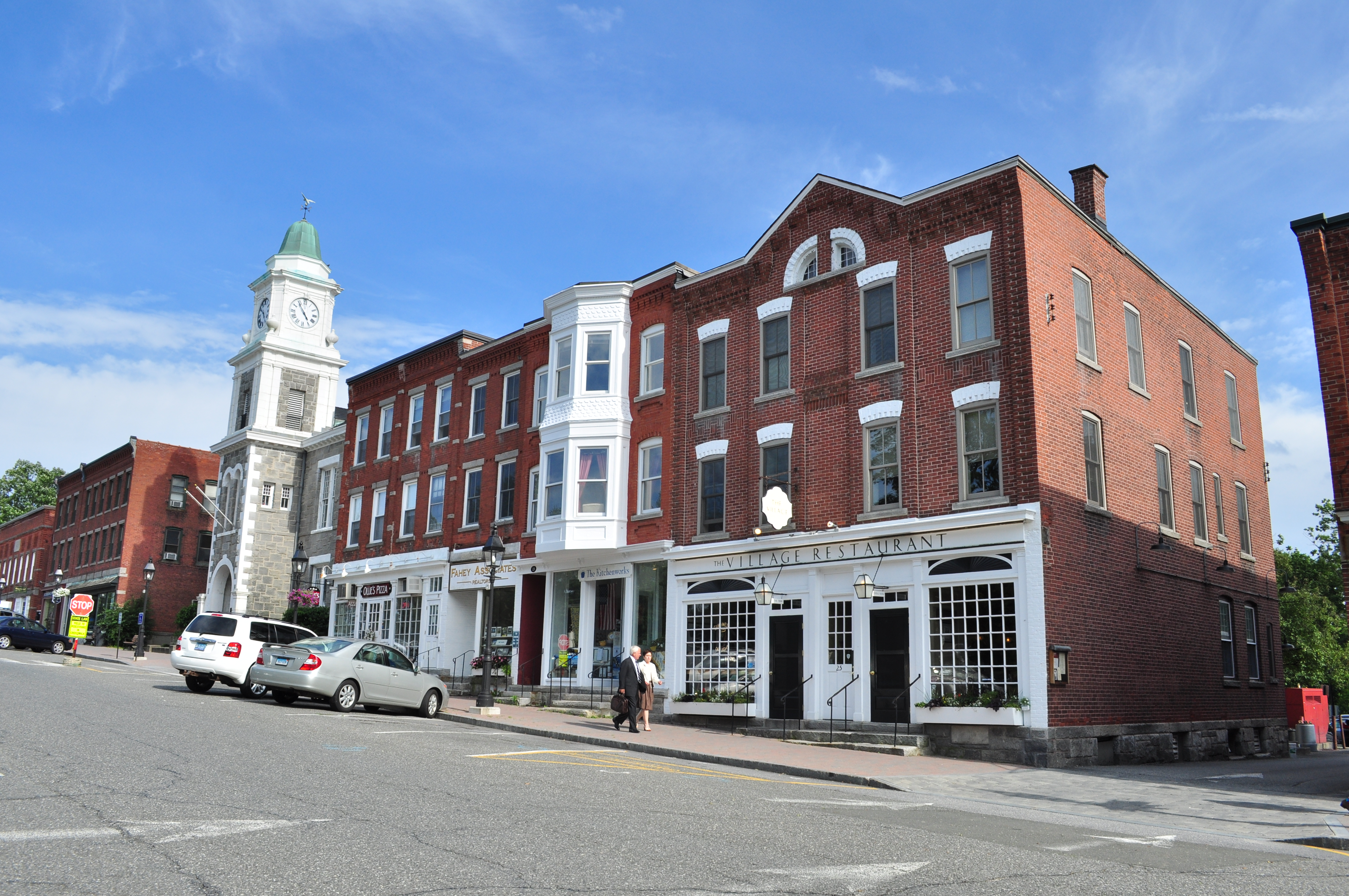
- From top left: Naugatuck River in Torrington, Mohawk Mountain Ski Area, Kent Falls State Park, Main Street in North Canaan, West Street in Litchfield

- Logo

- Location within the U.S. state of Connecticut
- Coordinates: 41°50′N 73°13′W
- Country: United States
- State: Connecticut
- Founded: 2013
- Largest city: Torrington
- Other cities: Winsted

Government
  - Executive Director: Robert A. Phillips

Area
  - Total: 786.6 sq mi (2,037 km^{2})

Population (2020)
  - Total: 112,503
  - Estimate (2025): 114,690 ▲
  - Density: 143.0/sq mi (55.22/km^{2})
- Time zone: UTC−5 (Eastern)
  - Summer (DST): UTC−4 (EDT)
- Congressional districts: 1st, 5th
- Website: northwesthillscog.org

Interactive map of the Northwest Hills Planning Region

The Northwest Hills Planning Region is a planning region and county-equivalent in the U.S. state of Connecticut. It is served by the coterminous Northwest Hills Council of Governments (NHCOG). In 2022, planning regions were approved to replace Connecticut's counties as county-equivalents for statistical purposes, with full implementation occurring by 2024.

== Demographics ==
Historical population
| Census | Pop. | Note | %± |
|---|---|---|---|
| 1790 | 21,742 | | — |
| 1800 | 7,020 | | −67.7% |
| 1810 | 7,509 | | 7.0% |
| 1820 | 32,911 | | 338.3% |
| 1830 | 34,811 | | 5.8% |
| 1840 | 34,989 | | 0.5% |
| 1850 | 35,718 | | 2.1% |
| 1860 | 36,929 | | 3.4% |
| 1870 | 37,844 | | 2.5% |
| 1880 | 39,020 | | 3.1% |
| 1890 | 39,004 | | 0.0% |
| 1900 | 44,144 | | 13.2% |
| 1910 | 50,342 | | 14.0% |
| 1920 | 52,906 | | 5.1% |
| 1930 | 58,064 | | 9.7% |
| 1940 | 60,710 | | 4.6% |
| 1950 | 68,884 | | 13.5% |
| 1960 | 79,406 | | 15.3% |
| 1970 | 90,630 | | 14.1% |
| 1980 | 96,850 | | 6.9% |
| 1990 | 107,274 | | 10.8% |
| 2000 | 117,353 | | 9.4% |
| 2010 | 122,959 | | 4.8% |
| 2020 | 112,503 | | −8.5% |
| 2025 (est.) | 114,690 | ▲ | 1.9% |
U.S. Decennial Census

As of the 2020 United States census, there were 112,503 people living in the Northwest Hills Planning Region.

== Municipalities ==
The following municipalities are members of the Northwest Hills Region:

=== Cities ===
- Torrington
- Winsted (city and consolidated CDP of Winchester)

=== Towns ===
- Barkhamsted
- Burlington
- Canaan
- Colebrook
- Cornwall
- Goshen
- Hartland
- Harwinton
- Kent
- Litchfield
- Morris
- New Hartford
- Norfolk
- North Canaan
- Roxbury
- Salisbury
- Sharon
- Warren
- Washington
- Winchester
