= Climate change in Connecticut =

Climate change in the US state of Connecticut

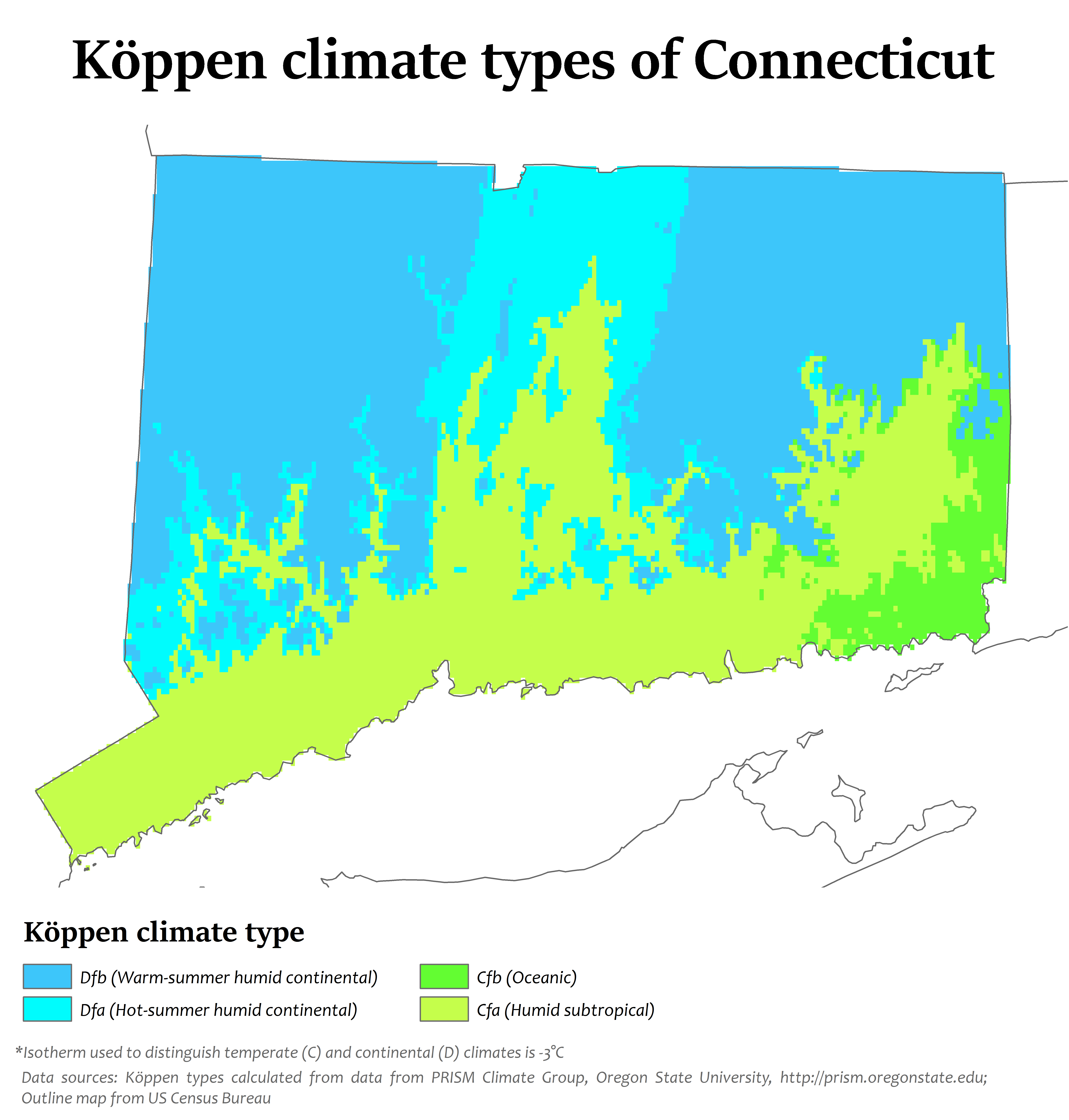
Former map of Köppen climate types in Connecticut.

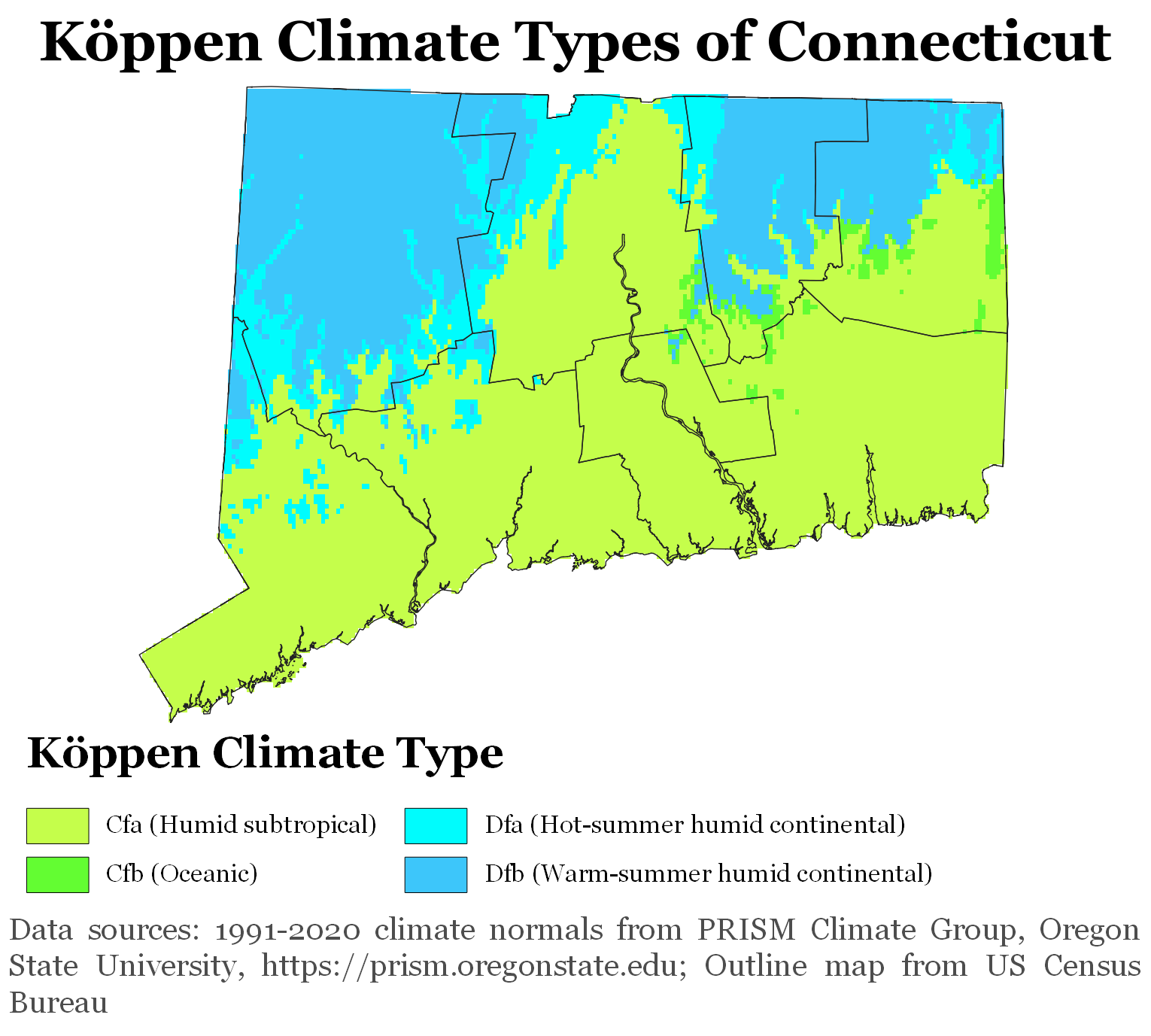
Köppen climate types using 1991–2020 climate normals.

Climate change in Connecticut encompasses the effects of climate change, attributed to man-made increases in atmospheric carbon dioxide, in the U.S. state of Connecticut.

The United States Environmental Protection Agency (EPA) reports that "Connecticut's climate is changing. The state has warmed two to three degrees (F) in the last century. Throughout the northeastern United States, spring is arriving earlier and bringing more precipitation, heavy rainstorms are more frequent, and summers are hotter and drier. Sea level is rising, and severe storms increasingly cause floods that damage property and infrastructure. In the coming decades, changing the climate is likely to increase flooding, harm ecosystems, disrupt farming, and increase some risks to human health".

== Environmental impacts ==
=== Increasing temperature and changing precipitation patterns ===
According to the Hartford Courant, "[i]ntense rainfall is becoming common across the state. Violent storms are expected to hit more often". The EPA further reports "Rising temperatures and shifting rainfall patterns are likely to increase the intensity of both floods and droughts. Average annual precipitation in the Northeast increased 10 percent from 1895 to 2011, and precipitation from extremely heavy storms has increased 70 percent since 1958. During the next century, average annual precipitation and the frequency of heavy downpours are likely to keep rising. Average precipitation is likely to increase during winter and spring, but not change significantly during summer and fall. Rising temperatures will melt snow earlier in spring and increase evaporation, and thereby dry the soil during summer and fall. So flooding is likely to be worse during winter and spring, and droughts worse during summer and fall".

=== Sea level rise, wetland loss, and coastal flooding ===
According to the Hartford Courant, the levels of the Long Island Sound "have been rising for decades, and its waters are warming. So is Connecticut's air. Shoreline flooding is more frequent". The EPA further reports "Rising sea level erodes wetlands and beaches and increases damage from coastal storms. Tidal wetlands are inherently vulnerable because of their low elevations, and shoreline development prevents them from migrating inland onto higher ground. Human activities such as filling wetlands have destroyed about one third of New England’s coastal wetlands since the early 1800s. Wetlands provide habitat for many bird species, such as osprey and heron, as well as several fish species. Losing coastal wetlands would harm coastal ecosystems and remove an important line of defense against coastal flooding. Coastal cities and towns will become more vulnerable to storms in the coming century as sea level rises, shorelines erode, and storm surges become higher. Storms can destroy coastal homes, wash out highways and rail lines, and damage essential communication, energy, and wastewater management infrastructure".

Exacerbating the flood risks generated by ecosystem degradation, the state allows significant development to occur in floodplains and high-flood-risk areas. Indeed, new housing has been built between 2010 and 2019 in areas with high projected flood rates at three times the rate of non-risky areas. Though Connecticut state has tried to arrange buyback programs for housing and land on floodplains, cities and municipalities have fought back in many cases to protect their tax base.

== Economic and social impacts ==
=== Ecosystems and agriculture ===
According to the EPA "Warmer temperatures cause cows to eat less and produce less milk. That could reduce the output of Connecticut’s $70-million dairy industry, which provides 13 percent of the state’s farm revenue. Some farms may be harmed if more hot days and droughts reduce crop yields, or if more flooding and wetter springs delay their planting dates. Other farms may benefit from a longer growing season and the fertilizing effect of carbon dioxide".

=== Human health ===
According to the EPA "The risk of some diseases carried by insects may increase. The ticks that transmit Lyme disease are active when temperatures are above 45°F, so warmer winters could lengthen the season during which ticks can become infected or people can be exposed to the ticks. Higher temperatures would also make more of New England warm enough for the Asian tiger mosquito, a common carrier of West Nile virus. The number of cases may or may not increase, depending on what people do to control insect populations and avoid insect bites".

== Responses ==
=== State policy ===
In December 2019, Connecticut joined consideration for a multi-state gasoline cap-and-trade program. The plan aims to reduce transportation-related tailpipe emissions, and would levy a tax on fuel companies based on carbon dioxide emissions. The most ambitious version of the plan is projected to reduce the area's tailpipe emissions by 25% between 2022 and 2032. The program is in the public comment phase, with individual states determining whether to participate. The program could begin as early as 2022. In May 2024, Connecticut ended its annual legislative session, again failing to pass in the Senate the House-approved "wide-ranging" climate bill that would have declared a climate crisis" in the Constitution State, established emissions standards for state-level agencies, allocated incentive money to entice businesses to adopt sustainable practices, and promoted installation of hundreds of thousands of home heat pumps Connecticut also failed to pass a significant climate bill in 2023.

=== Connecticut v ExxonMobil Corp ===
Connecticut v. ExxonMobil Corp is a climate change litigation case brought on ExxonMobil for seeking profit despite knowing the damages it would produce on the environment.

On Monday, September 15, 2020, Connecticut Attorney General William Tong filed a lawsuit against ExxonMobil for their products contributed to the emissions that cause global warming and climate change. The state is "seeking compensation for past, present and future harm from climate change, including for investments already made, and is going after some of the company's profits."

Connecticut accuses ExxonMobil about misleading investors to how their products contribute to climate change. Tong says the state is facing millions of dollars in "damage due to rising sea levels, more storms, increased erosion and other impacts from climate change. Tong claims ExxonMobil knows that burning fossil fuels impact the environment, but instead of admitting it, they try to deceive the public. The case was filed to the Hartford Superior Court.

Currently, the existing case between the state of Connecticut and the ExxonMobil Corp. remains unsettled, there has yet to be any compensation to the state. After the filing of the case in 2020, it was stated by Judge Richard Sullivan in 2022, that given the difficulty of these types of cases, the state court might argue that Connecticut is not entitled to the entirety of the damages caused by global warming from over the last half century/centuries.

== See also ==
- Plug-in electric vehicles in Connecticut
- List of U.S. states and territories by carbon dioxide emissions
