= District of Columbia v. Exxon Mobil Corp. =

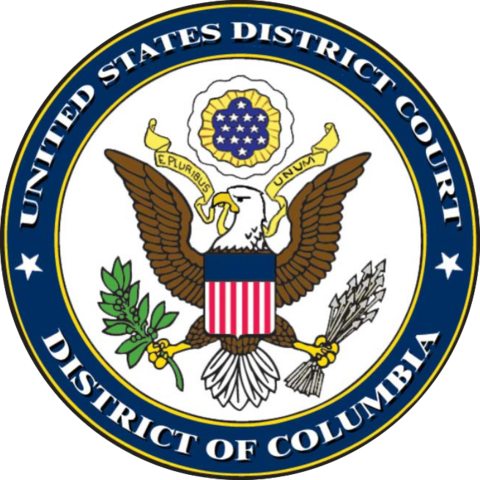
- Seal of the United States District Court for the District of Columbia
- Court: United States District Court for the District of Columbia
- Started: June 25th, 2020

Case history
- Appealed from: Superior Court of the District of Columbia
- Appealed to: United States District Court for the District of Columbia

District of Columbia v. Exxon Mobil Corp. is an ongoing lawsuit filed against Exxon Mobil Corporation and ExxonMobil Oil Corporation by the District of Columbia (D.C.). This case is one of a long list of lawsuits filed against ExxonMobil including environmental and ethical wrongdoings.

== Background ==
=== ExxonMobil ===
ExxonMobil is a multinational oil and gas corporation headquartered in Irving, Texas. It is the largest publicly traded oil and gas company in the world, making it one of the most profitable companies. In addition to this, ExxonMobil is a major player in the global energy market. Exxon Mobil has operations in over 30 countries, and its operations are divided into four business segments: Upstream, Downstream, Chemical, and Corporate & Financing.

=== The D.C. Consumer Procedures Act 1976 ===
The D.C. Consumer Protection Procedures Act ("CPPA") is a remedial statute that is to be broadly construed. It establishes an enforceable right to truthful information from merchants about consumer goods and services that are or would be purchased, leased, or received in the District of Columbia.

=== Historical context ===
On June 25, 2020, D.C. filed to sue Exxon Mobil Corp for potentially violating the D.C. Consumer Protection Procedures Act ("CPPA") in the Superior Court of the District of Columbia. The case has been appealed and is currently pending in the United States District Court for the District of Columbia. The District of Columbia argued that Exxon Mobil had made false and misleading statements about its knowledge of climate change and its assessment of the risks posed by climate change to its business. The District of Columbia also argued that Exxon Mobil had made false and misleading statements about its efforts to reduce the risks posed by climate change. Among these are several other CPPA violations written in the official complaint.

Exxon Mobil has not yet responded to the motion for summary judgment. The court has not yet ruled on the motion. The court date is not currently scheduled. Among Exxon Mobil Corp are BP Royal Dutch Shell PLC and Shell Oil Company, P.L.C. and BP America Inc., and Chevron Corporation and Chevron USA, Inc., which are also being sued by D.C. on other counts for violating the same act.

== Environmental impact ==
Forces affecting global warming

The allegations against ExxonMobil relate to the company's alleged misrepresentation and deception of the risks of climate change and its impact on the environment. The case accuses ExxonMobil of knowingly misleading investors and the public about the risks of climate change and its impact on the company's financial performance. By doing so, ExxonMobil may have made climate change worse by its actions, which could lead to problems like rising sea levels and more extreme weather. This case doesn't focus on any specific harm caused by ExxonMobil, but rather on the company's overall impact on the environment. ExxonMobil has vigorously denied these allegations and argued that the case is politically motivated. However, ExxonMobil is a major player in the oil and gas industry, which means they contribute significantly to the release of carbon dioxide and other greenhouse gasses into the atmosphere through the burning of fossil fuels. This emission has a global impact and contributes to climate change.

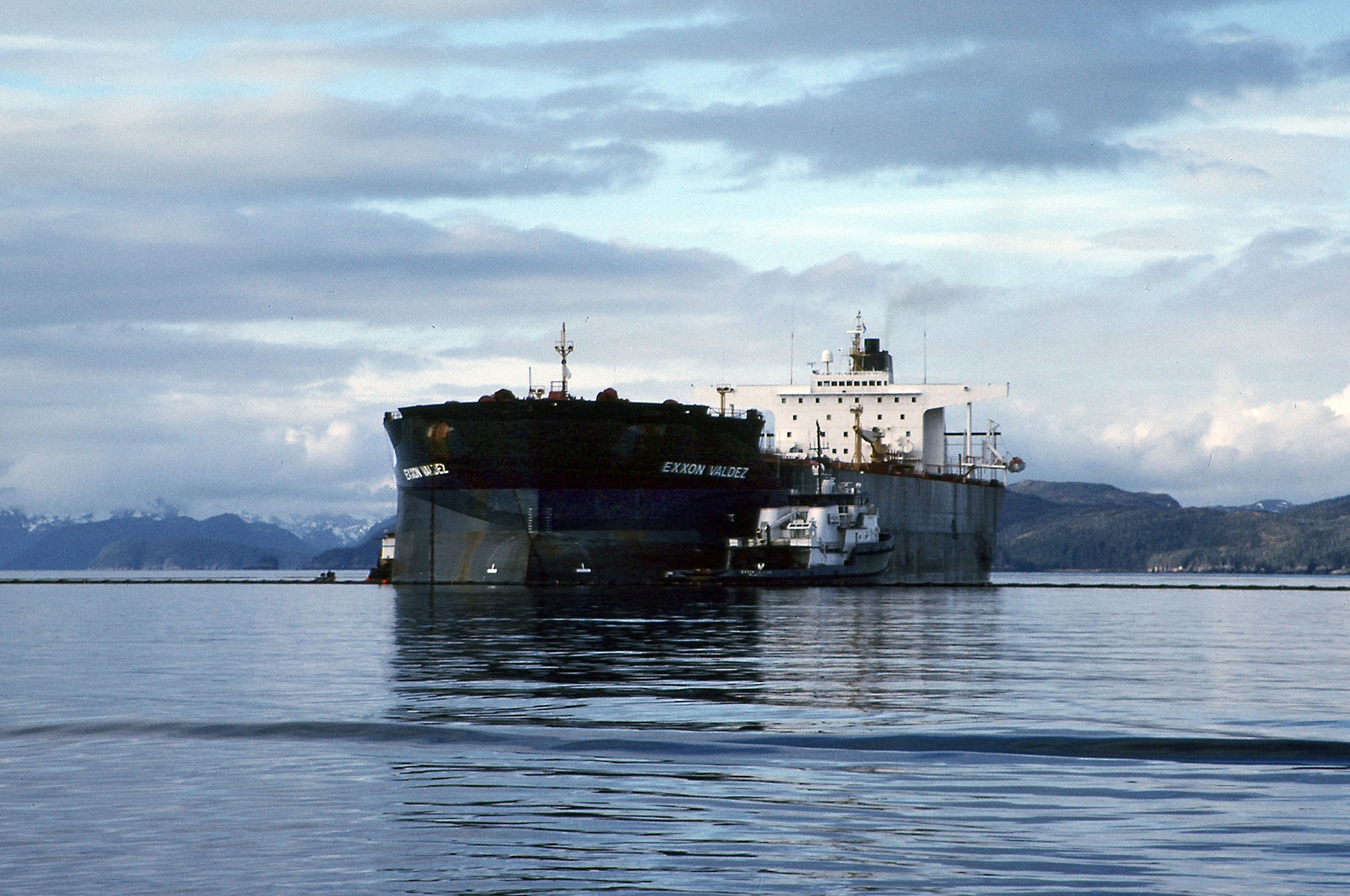
Exxon Valdez oil spill

In the past, ExxonMobil has been involved in many other high-profile oil spills, and accidents ExxonMobil has faced criticism for its handling of oil spills, including the 1989 Exxon Valdez spill in Alaska, which was one of the worst environmental disasters in U.S. history. Accusations have also been made that the company doesn't do enough to prevent oil spills and address them effectively. These spills aren't the only thing in question. ExxonMobil refineries and factories emit so much toxic air pollutants for the environment that the company's values have been questioned. Additionally, ExxonMobil has been charged with adding to deforestation in areas where it conducts business, especially in Indonesia, where it has been working to establish palm oil plantations. Significant effects of deforestation on soil erosion, carbon sequestration, and wildlife are possible.

== Economic impact ==
The District of Columbia V. Exxon Mobil Corp. is and can continue to be a landmark case that had a significant impact on the economy of the United States. The case involves allegations that ExxonMobil has not only misled the public about the effects of climate change occurring but also misleads investors into believing that ExxonMobil was more climate-friendly. ExxonMobil continues to publicize how environmentally friendly they are on their website, claiming to strive to be a leader in the industry. Only 0.2 percent of capital investments by ExxonMobil are in green technology. This information misleads consumers and investors and portrays ExxonMobil as a company that shows the good impacts of their company on the environment but hides the bad ones.

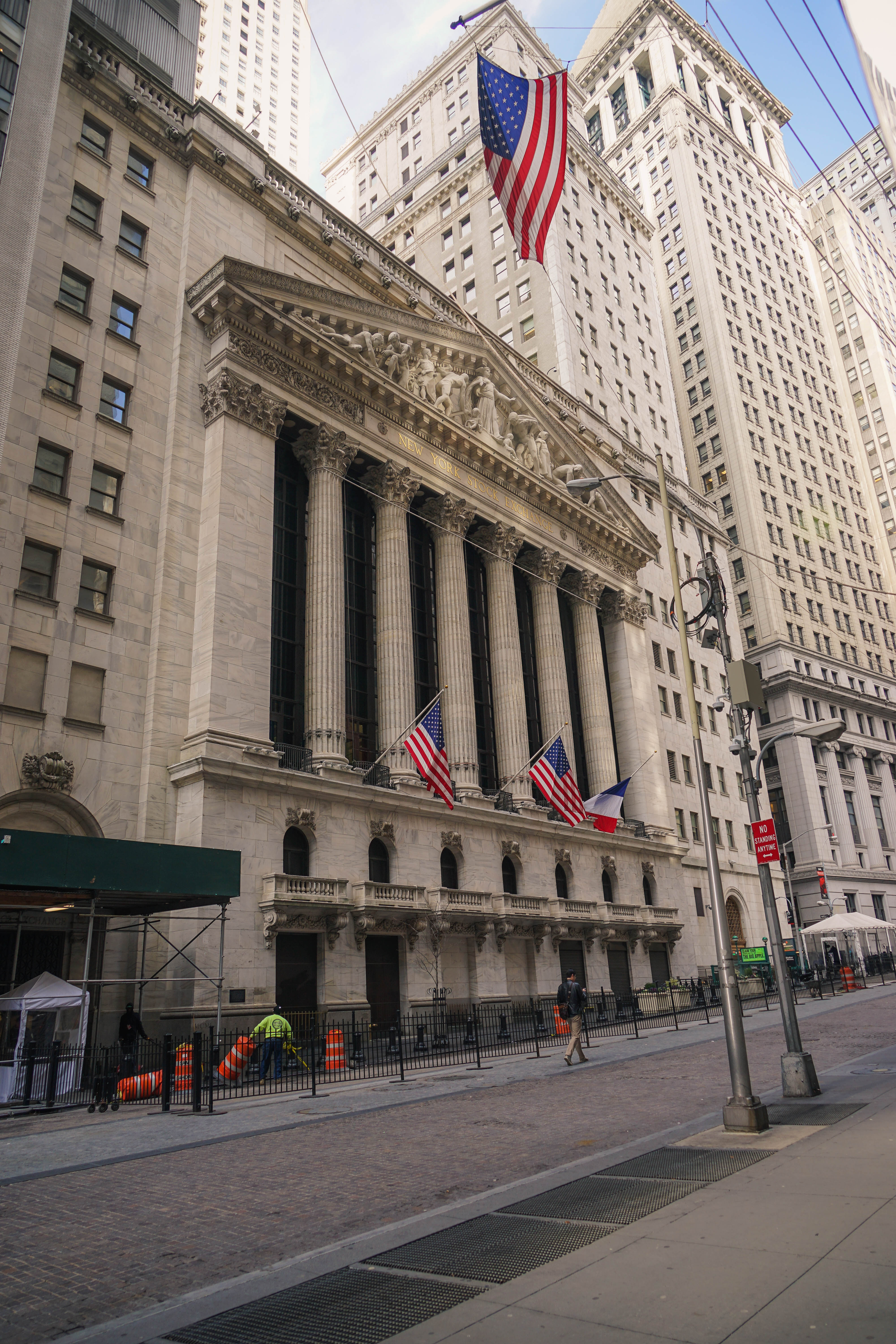
New York Stock Exchange

One of the most significant economic impacts of this case is on the fossil fuel industry. ExxonMobil, as one of the largest fossil fuel companies in the world, is seeing and will continue to see the consequences of its own actions as this court case continues, even if the case sides with ExxonMobil. This case, among other cases from ExxonMobil like People of the State of New York v. Exxon Mobil Corp., serves as a wake-up call for the industry, highlighting the need for companies to be transparent about their climate risks and the potential economic impact. The New York case ruled that ExxonMobile did not mislead investors directly through their actions. It has made investors aware of how it is possible to weave around laws to hide their actions, affecting investors instead of consumers with District of Columbia v. Exxon Mobile Corp. These cases will put pressure on other companies to not hide their information, creating environmental and economic transparency which will benefit investors and consumers.

ExxonMobil themselves would face a great loss if the case were decided in favor of the District of Columbia. They would have to pay damages from the case along with facing additional backlash from the public. Much of this along with the other economic impacts is still uncertain as the case has not been settled and depends greatly on which side wins.

== Political impact ==
The lawsuit also raises questions about the role of government regulation in addressing climate change. The case exposes the need for stronger regulations to hold companies accountable for their impact on the environment and the economy. There also is a cause for concern about the government not intervening sooner. ExxonMobil was caught withholding information just years earlier with the People of the State of New York v. Exxon Mobil Corp. Both cases concern withholding information from the public. ExxonMobil has repeated its past behavior by misleading investors and consumers. Additional laws within the government are solutions to prevent ExxonMobil and other companies from misleading the public. This case falls particularly hard on the government as ExxonMobil has received subsidies from them. For decades, ExxonMobil has been receiving state and local subsidiaries including loans and bailouts.

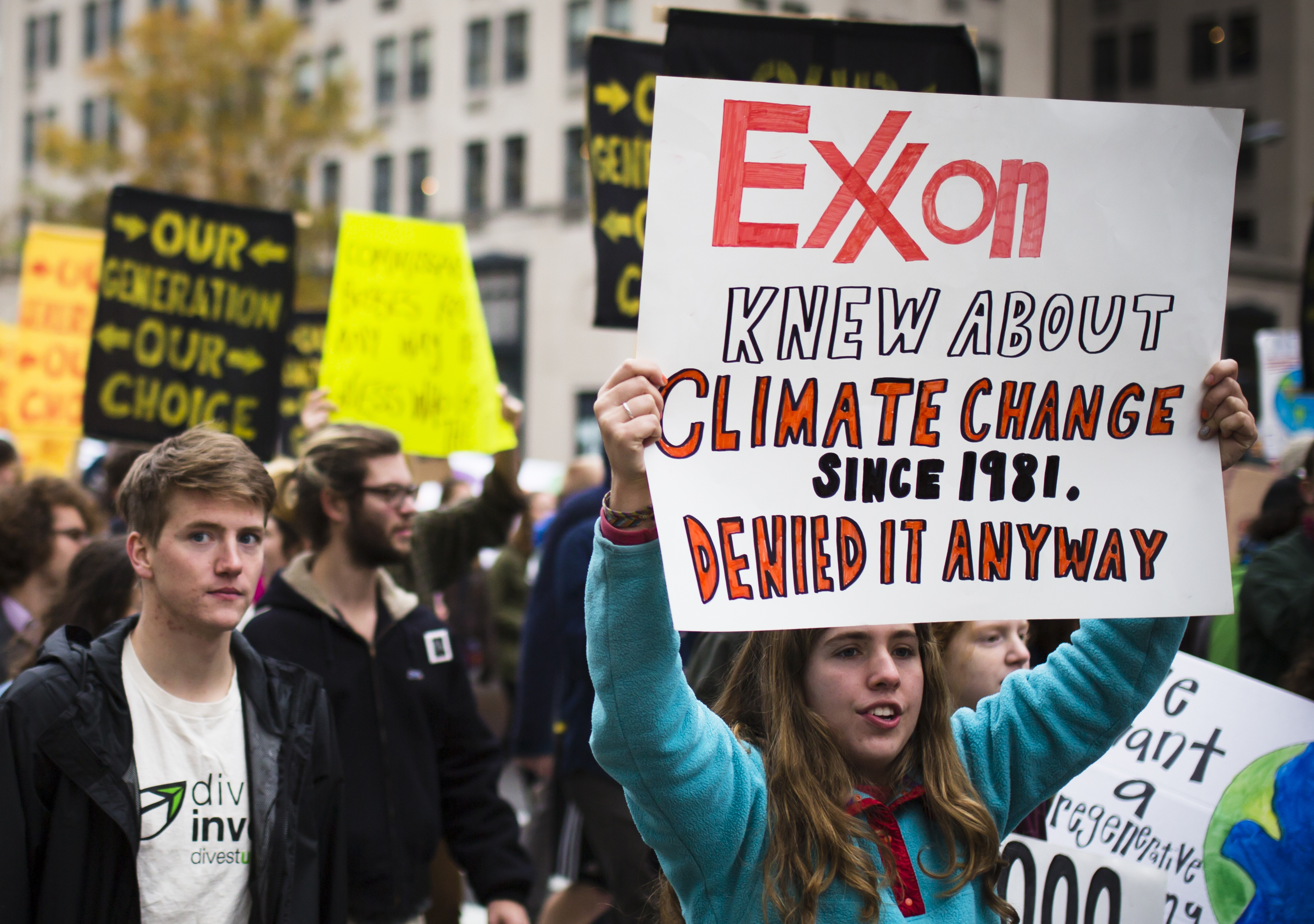
"Exxon Knew" sign during a protest in Washington D.C.

Exxon has also caused sparks with the campaign #ExxonKnew. The #ExxonKnew campaign against ExxonMobil claiming that Exxon knew about its effects on climate change for the past 40 years. The campaign also claims that Exxon withheld the information to make a profit which misled stockholders, investors, and consumers. The campaign was kickstarted in 2012 when the Rockefeller-funded organized conferences which included The Union of Concerned Scientists and the Climate Accountability Institute. The first article with the tag #ExxonKnew was published on September 16, 2015, on Inside Climate News. The campaign has continued to spread over the past decade and has highlighted that Exxon has not only known about climate change but that they have actively engaged with environmental technology as well. This includes spending one million U.S. dollars measuring how much CO_{2} is absorbed by the ocean and not speaking that information and advanced technology to the public. The #ExxonKnew campaign has been spreading this information through multiple platforms including sources such as The New York Times, and continues to spread information, including about the District of Columbia v. Exxon Mobil Corp. case, adding to the criticism of ExxonMobil.

== Official statements ==
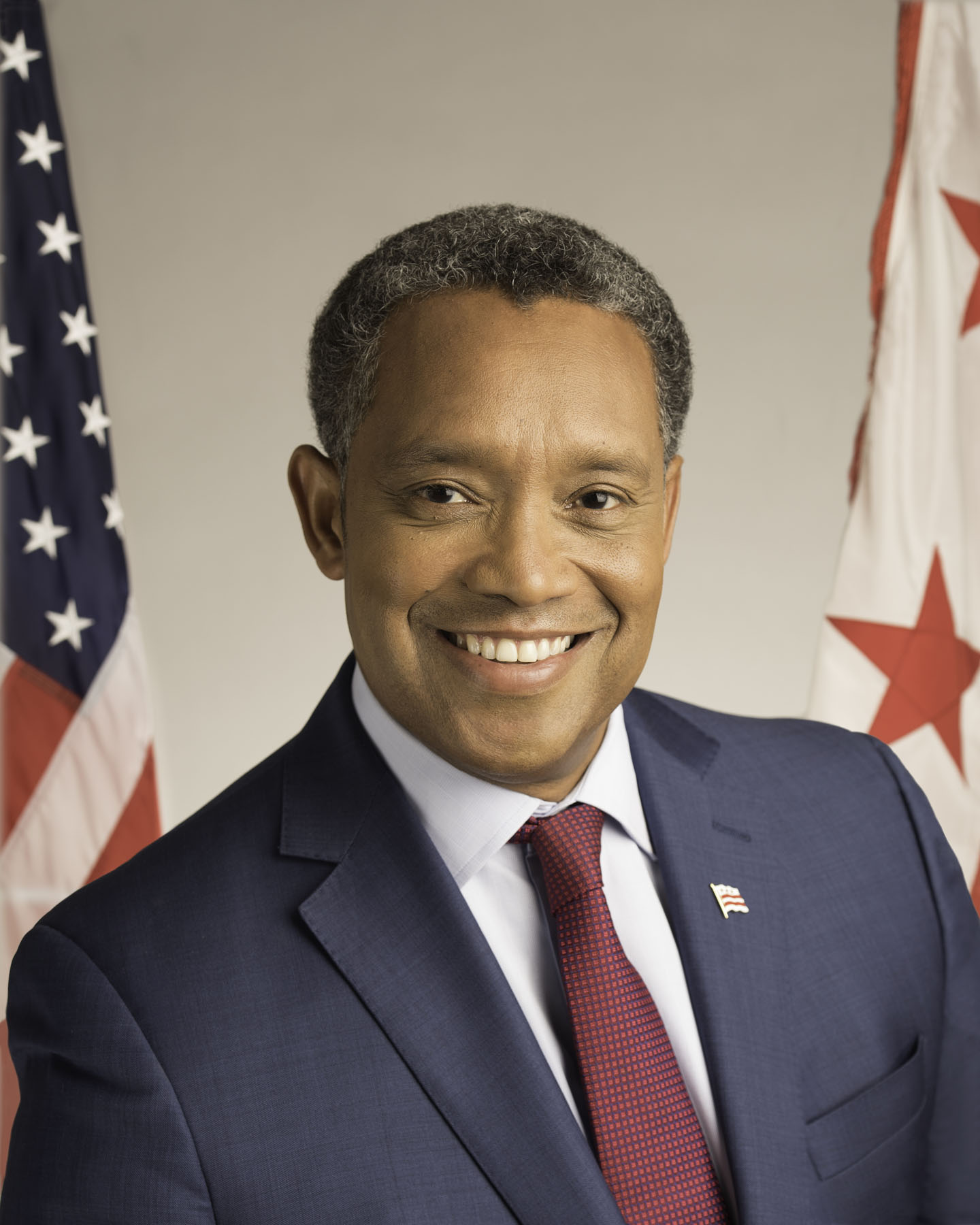
Karl Racine, former Attorney General for the District of Columbia

An ongoing battle between the spokespeople of Exxon Mobil Corp. and D.C. in media has been ongoing concurrent to the case at bay. ExxonMobil spokesperson Casey Norton denied the allegations made by D.C. against the fossil fuel companies arguing, "This lawsuit further demonstrates the ongoing coordinated, politically motivated campaign against energy companies," in an email statement. "Legal proceedings like this waste millions of dollars of taxpayer money and do nothing to advance meaningful actions that reduce the risks of climate change."

In a statement regarding the case, former D.C. Attorney General Karl Racine stated that ExxonMobil and other fossil fuel companies violated the district's consumer protection law, covering up their knowledge of fossil fuel's negative impact on health and the environment. "Defendants' deceptive and unlawful conduct targeted consumers in the District, and in significant part occurred in the District, including through print advertisements in the District and electronic advertisements provided to DC consumers, including the Washington Post, as well as at District train stations and airports." Currently, the new Attorney General for the District of Columbia, Brian Schwalb, is continuing the case of his predecessor.

== Similar cases ==
=== Minnesota ===
In the days before DC brought its case against ExxonMobil, the attorney general of the state of Minnesota, Keith Ellison, sued ExxonMobil for violating Minnesota laws in regard to false advertisement, consumer fraud, and deceptive trade practices.

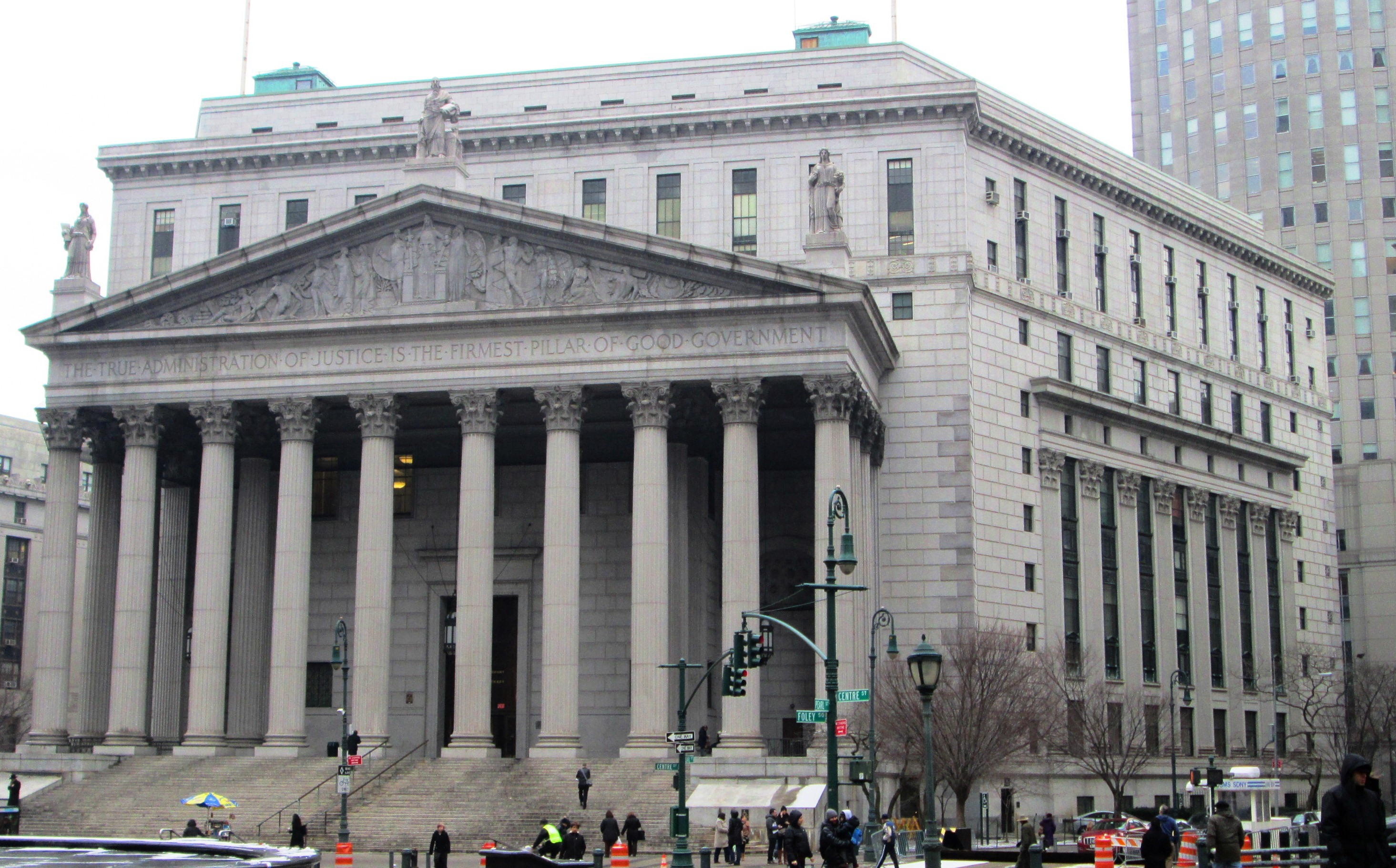
New York County Courthouse

=== New York ===
In 2019, in New York, ExxonMobil won its lawsuit against the state, accusing the company of misleading its investors in regard to their product's impact on the climate by using two different figures to determine their risk. The judge of the case, Barry Ostrager of the Manhattan Supreme Court, stated the evidence presented by the State of New York showed that the company had done nothing to mislead investors.

=== Massachusetts ===
In April 2016, the Commonwealth of Massachusetts brought a civil lawsuit started an investigation into whether ExxonMobil violated its consumer protections statute. The Commonwealth is investigating if the company misled consumers in regard to fossil fuels impact on the climate. The high court of Massachusetts dismissed ExxonMobil's bid to terminate the lawsuit in May 2022, claiming the Commonwealth violated SLAPP laws.

== Current status ==
The District of Columbia v. Exxon Mobil Corp case is ongoing. The case has been delayed multiple times due to various legal issues and appeals, and it is unclear when a final resolution will be reached. Exxon Mobil has also faced criticism and other forms of legal action from environmental groups and governments for its alleged role in promoting climate denial, worsening the effects of climate change, and obstructing climate action. ExxonMobil has also been accused of lobbying against climate policies and funding politicians who deny the reality of climate change. However, in response to these allegations, the company has stated that it supports climate action and has invested in research into lower-emission technologies. Environmental activists and critics, on the other hand, argue that ExxonMobil's continued focus on fossil fuel production and lack of significant investment in renewable energy suggests that the company is not taking the threat of climate change seriously enough and that it will have detrimental effects to Earth's environment in the future.
