= Participatory organization =

Organization based on public participation

A participatory organization is an organization which is built based on public participation rather than their contract obligations.

== Types ==
Different types of participatory organizations are possible including production companies, membership organizations (such as trade unions), and co-operatives. They can be legally registered formal organizations or may object to state regulation and be considered an informal organization.

Participatory organizations can have different levels of participation, ranging from complete economic transparency, to participatory management, and ultimately labor management.

== Criticism ==
Participatory organizations are negatively affected by the free-rider problem, can be inefficient, and lack clear leadership and strategy.

== See also ==
- Gift economy
- Human-based genetic algorithm
- Public participation
- Reciprocity
- Stigmergy
- Voluntary association
