= Connecticut v. ExxonMobil Corp. =

US climate change litigation case

Connecticut v. ExxonMobil Corp is a climate change litigation case brought on ExxonMobil for seeking profit despite knowing the damages it would produce on the environment.

On Monday, September 15, 2020, Connecticut Attorney General William Tong filed a lawsuit against ExxonMobil for their products contributed to the emissions that cause global warming and climate change. The state is "seeking compensation for past, present and future harm from climate change, including for investments already made, and is going after some of the company's profits."

Connecticut accuses ExxonMobil about misleading investors to how their products contribute to climate change. Tong says the state is facing millions of dollars in "damage due to rising sea levels, more storms, increased erosion and other impacts from climate change. Tong claims ExxonMobil knows that burning fossil fuels impact the environment, but instead of admitting it, they try to deceive the public. The case was filed to the Hartford Superior Court.

Currently, the existing case between the state of Connecticut and the ExxonMobil Corp. remains unsettled, there has yet to be any compensation to the state. After the filing of the case in 2020, it was stated by Judge Richard Sullivan in 2022, that given the difficulty of these types of cases, the state court might argue that Connecticut is not entitled to the entirety of the damages caused by global warming from over the last half century/centuries.

== See also ==
- District of Columbia v. Exxon Mobil Corp.
- People of the State of New York v. Exxon Mobil Corp.
