= ExxonMobil climate change denial =

Overview of climate-related ExxonMobil controversies

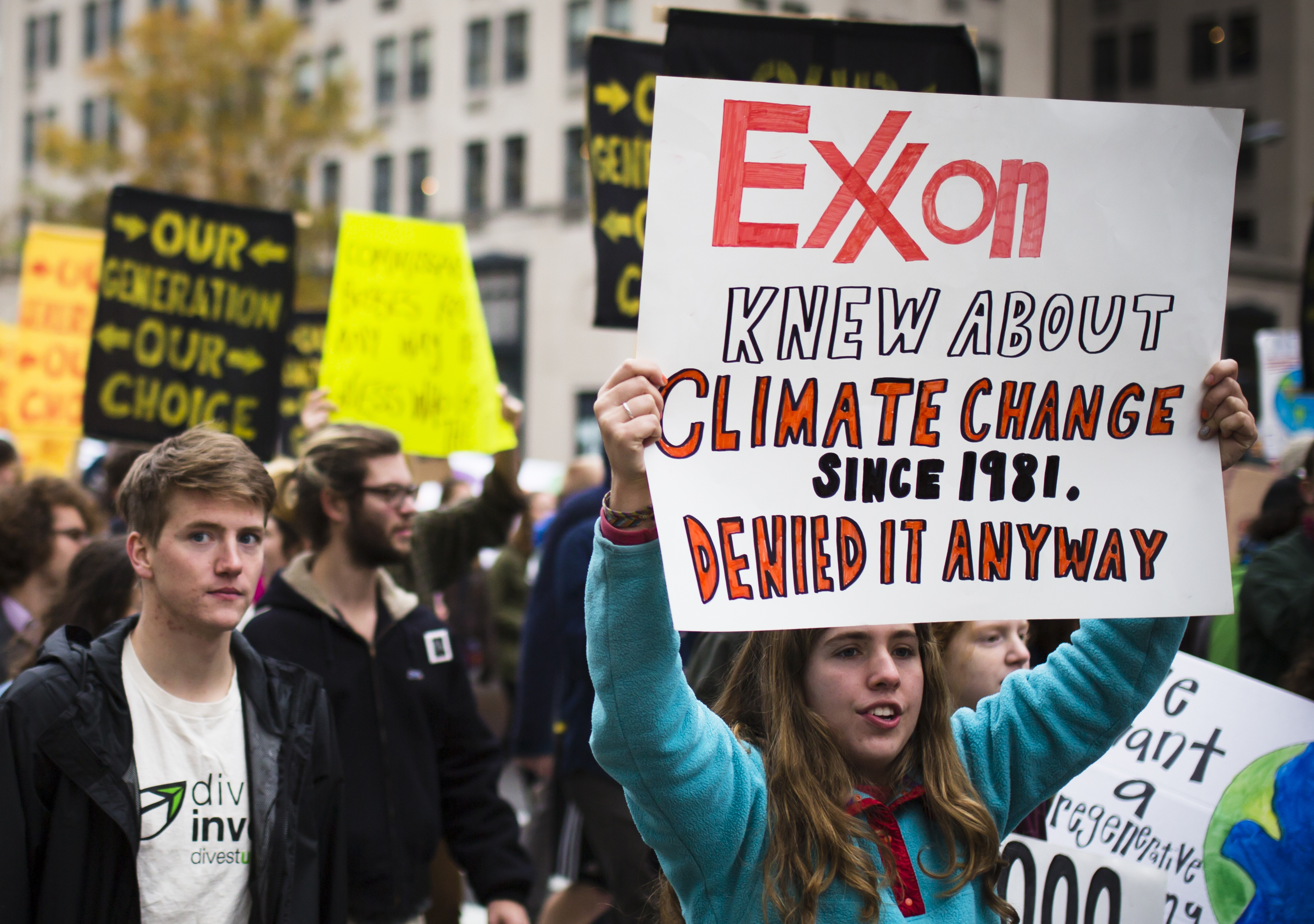
A protestor demonstrating as part of the "Exxon knew" movement in Washington, DC in 2015

From the 1980s to the mid 2000s, the American multinational oil and gas corporation ExxonMobil was a leader in climate change denial, opposing regulations to curtail global warming. For example, ExxonMobil was a significant influence in preventing ratification of the Kyoto Protocol by the United States. ExxonMobil funded organizations critical of the Kyoto Protocol and seeking to undermine public opinion about the scientific consensus that global warming is caused by the burning of fossil fuels. Of the major oil corporations, ExxonMobil has been the most active in the debate surrounding climate change. According to a 2007 analysis by the Union of Concerned Scientists, the company used many of the same strategies, tactics, organizations, and personnel the tobacco industry used in its denials of the link between lung cancer and smoking.

ExxonMobil has funded, among other groups, the Competitive Enterprise Institute, George C. Marshall Institute, Heartland Institute, the American Legislative Exchange Council and the International Policy Network. Between 1998 and 2004, ExxonMobil granted $16 million to advocacy organizations which disputed the impact of global warming. From 1989 until April 2010, ExxonMobil and its predecessor Mobil purchased regular Thursday advertorials in The New York Times, The Washington Post, and The Wall Street Journal claiming that the science of climate change was unsettled.

An analysis conducted by The Carbon Brief in 2011 found that 9 out of 10 of the most prolific authors who cast doubt on climate change or speak against it had ties to ExxonMobil. Greenpeace have said that Koch industries invested more than US$50 million in the past 50 years on spreading doubts about climate change.

Since the 1970s, ExxonMobil and its predecessors had engaged in climate research focusing on global warming. From the late 1970s and through the 1980s, Exxon funded internal and university collaborations, broadly in line with the developing public scientific approach. A review in 2023 found that the global warming projections documented by and the models created by ExxonMobil's own scientists between 1977 and 2003 had "accurately" projected and "skillfully" modeled global warming due to fossil fuel burning, and had reasonably estimated how much CO_{2} would lead to dangerous warming. The authors of the paper concluded: "Yet, whereas academic and government scientists worked to communicate what they knew to the public, ExxonMobil worked to deny it."

In April 2014, ExxonMobil released a report publicly acknowledging climate change risk for the first time. ExxonMobil predicted that a rising global population, increasing living standards and increasing energy access would result in lower greenhouse gas emissions. In 2015, it expressed support for a carbon tax.

In 2015, the Attorney General of New York launched an investigation whether ExxonMobil's statements to investors were consistent with the company's decades of extensive scientific research. In October 2018, based on this investigation, ExxonMobil was sued by the State of New York, which claimed the company defrauded shareholders by downplaying the risks of climate change for its businesses.

== Own research ==
From the late 1970s and through the 1980s, Exxon, one of predecessors of ExxonMobil, had a public reputation as a pioneer in climate change research. Exxon funded internal and university collaborations, broadly in line with the developing public scientific approach, and developed a reputation for expertise in atmospheric carbon dioxide (CO_{2}). Between the 1970s and 2015, Exxon and ExxonMobil researchers and academic collaborators published dozens of research papers. ExxonMobil provided a list of over 50 article citations from that period.

In July 1977, a senior scientist of Exxon, James Black, reported to the company's executives that there was a general scientific agreement at that time that the burning of fossil fuels was the most likely manner in which mankind was influencing global climate change. In 1979–1982, Exxon conducted a research program of climate change and climate modeling, including a research project of equipping their largest supertanker Esso Atlantic with a laboratory and sensors to measure the absorption of carbon dioxide by the oceans. In 1980, Exxon noted that synthetic fuels increase CO_{2} emissions over their petroleum equivalents. Exxon also studied ways of avoiding CO_{2} emissions if the East Natuna gas field (Natuna D-Alpha block) off Indonesia was to be developed.

In 1981, Exxon shifted its research focus to climate modelling. In 1982, Exxon's environmental affairs office circulated an internal report to Exxon's management which said that the consequences of climate change could be catastrophic, and that a significant reduction in fossil fuel consumption would be necessary to curtail future climate change. It also said that "there is concern among some scientific groups that once the effects are measurable, they might not be reversible."

In 1992, the senior ice researcher, leading a research team in Exxon's Canadian subsidiary Imperial Oil, assessed how global warming could affect Exxon's Arctic operations, and reported that exploration and development costs in the Beaufort Sea might be lower, while higher sea levels and rougher seas could threaten the company's coastal and offshore infrastructure. Imperial included these forecasts into its facility planning in the Mackenzie River Delta in the Northwest Territories. In 1996, Mobil, another predecessor of ExxonMobil, calculated the climate changes effect to the Sable gas field project. An ExxonMobil spokesperson said that standard practice in major project planning is to consider a range of factors, and that ExxonMobil's consideration of environmental risks was not inconsistent with their public policy advocacy.

In 2016, the Center for International Environmental Law, a public interest, not-for-profit environmental law firm, claimed that from 1957 onward Humble Oil, one of predecessors of nowadays ExxonMobil, was aware of rising CO_{2} in the atmosphere and the prospect that it was likely to cause global warming. ExxonMobil responded to this claim that "to suggest that we had definitive knowledge about human-induced climate change before the world's scientists is not a credible thesis."

=== Denial tactics despite own research results ===
In 1989, shortly after the presentation by the Exxon's manager of science and strategy development Duane LeVine to the board of directors which reiterated that introducing public policy to combat climate change "can lead to irreversible and costly Draconian steps," the company shifted its position on the climate change to publicly questioning it. This shift was caused by concerns about the potential impact of the climate policy measures to the oil industry.

In the fall of 2015, InsideClimate News published a series of reports on an eight-month investigation based on decades of internal Exxon Mobil files and interviews with former Exxon employees, which stated "Exxon conducted cutting-edge climate research decades ago and then, without revealing all that it had learned, worked at the forefront of climate denial, manufacturing doubt about the scientific consensus that its own scientists had confirmed." Exxon responded to the article by saying the allegations were based on cherry-picked statements from ExxonMobil employees and noting the ongoing climate research the company engaged in during the time in question.

The company also denied claims made by InsideClimate News that it had curtailed carbon dioxide research in favor of climate denial. Exxon's statement said the drop in oil prices hurt oil companies in the 1980s and caused research cutbacks. The statement also claimed that it was uncertain if increases in greenhouse gas emissions caused significant warming, or if immediate action on climate change was necessary.

The content analysis of Exxon Mobil's and its precessors' internal reports, peer-reviewed research papers, and advertorials Exxon placed in the op-ed section of The New York Times between 1972 and 2001, by Harvard University researchers Geoffrey Supran and Naomi Oreskes found that "83% of peer-reviewed papers and 80% of internal documents [from Exxon] acknowledge that climate change is real and human-caused, yet only 12% of advertorials do so, with 81% instead expressing doubt". The research concluded that ExxonMobil contributed to advancing climate science but promoted doubt about it in advertorials. The report was criticized by ExxonMobil and the Independent Petroleum Association of America, an oil and gas lobbying group, because of alleged incomplete sampling of data collected by Greenpeace, authors' involvement in the #ExxonKnew campaign, and partial financing by the Rockefeller Family Fund. The IPAA also pointed out that Exxon and Mobil were separate companies during much of the period in question, claiming that "the climate research was done primarily by Exxon and the advertorials were primarily done by Mobil."

In 2023, Science journal published a paper reporting that the global warming projections documented by and the models created by ExxonMobil's own scientists between 1977 and 2003 had "accurately" projected and "skillfully" modeled global warming due to fossil fuel burning, and had reasonably estimated how much CO_{2} would lead to dangerous warming. The authors of the paper concluded: "Yet, whereas academic and government scientists worked to communicate what they knew to the public, ExxonMobil worked to deny it."

== Funding of climate change denial ==
Of the major oil corporations, ExxonMobil has been the most active in the debate surrounding climate change. In 2005, as competing major oil companies diversified into alternative energy and renewable fuels, ExxonMobil re-affirmed its mission as an oil and gas company. According to a 2007 analysis by the Union of Concerned Scientists, the company used many of the same strategies, tactics, organizations, and personnel the tobacco industry used in its denials of the link between lung cancer and smoking. ExxonMobil denied similarity to the tobacco industry.

A study published in Nature Climate Change in 2015 found that ExxonMobil "may have played a particularly important role as corporate benefactors" in the production and diffusion of contrarian information.

During the 1990s and 2000s Exxon helped advance climate change denial internationally. ExxonMobil was a significant influence in preventing ratification of the Kyoto Protocol by the United States. ExxonMobil funded organizations critical of the Kyoto Protocol and seeking to undermine public opinion about the scientific consensus that global warming is caused by the burning of fossil fuels. Exxon was a founding member of the board of directors of the Global Climate Coalition, composed of businesses opposed to greenhouse gas emission regulation. According to Mother Jones magazine, between 2000 and 2003 ExxonMobil channelled at least $8,678,450 to forty organizations that employed disinformation campaigns including "skeptic propaganda masquerading as journalism" to influence the opinion of the public and political leaders about global warming.

ExxonMobil has funded, among other groups, the Competitive Enterprise Institute, George C. Marshall Institute, Heartland Institute, the American Legislative Exchange Council and the International Policy Network. Since the Kyoto Protocol, Exxon has given more than $20 million to organizations supporting climate change denial.

Between 1998 and 2004, ExxonMobil granted $16 million to advocacy organizations which disputed the impact of global warming.

The Royal Society conducted a survey in 2006 that found ExxonMobil had given US$2.9 million to American groups that "misinformed the public about climate change", 39 of which "misrepresented the science of climate change by outright denial of the evidence". The Royal Society expressed "concerns about ExxonMobil's funding of lobby groups that seek to misrepresent the scientific evidence relating to climate change." Also in 2006, the Royal Society issued a demand that ExxonMobil withdraw funding for climate change denial. The letter drew criticism, notably from Timothy Ball who argued the society attempted to "politicize the private funding of science and to censor scientific debate".

According to Drexel University environmental sociologist Robert Brulle, ExxonMobil contributed about 4% of the total funding of what Brulle identifies as the "climate change counter-movement." The Drexel research found that much of the funding that direct sourcing from companies like ExxonMobil and Koch Industries was later diverted through third-party foundations like Donors Trust and Donors Capital to avoid traceability. In 2006, the Brussels-based watchdog organization Corporate Europe Observatory said "ExxonMobil invests significant amounts in letting think-tanks, seemingly respectable sources, sow doubts about the need for [European Union] governments to take action to reduce greenhouse gas emissions. Covert funding for climate sceptics is deeply hypocritical because ExxonMobil spends major sums on advertising to present itself as an environmentally responsible company."

Between 2007 and 2015, ExxonMobil gave $1.87 million to Republicans in congress and $454,000 to the American Legislative Exchange Council. ExxonMobil denied funding climate denial. ExxonMobil was a member of ALEC's "Private Enterprise Advisory Council".; it left ALEC in 2018 .

In January 2007, ExxonMobil vice president for public affairs Kenneth Cohen said that, as of 2006, ExxonMobil had ceased funding of the Competitive Enterprise Institute and "'five or six' similar groups". While ExxonMobil did not identify the other similar groups, a May 2007 report by Greenpeace listed five groups "at the heart of the climate change denial industry" ExxonMobil had stopped funding, as well as 41 similar groups which were still receiving ExxonMobil funds.

In May 2008, ExxonMobil pledged in its annual corporate citizenship report that it would cut funding to "several public policy research groups whose position on climate change could divert attention" from the need to address climate change. In 2008, ExxonMobil funded such organizations and was named one of the most prominent promoters of climate change denial. According to Brulle in a 2012 Frontline interview, ExxonMobil had ceased funding the climate change counter-movement by 2009. According to the environmental advocacy group Greenpeace, ExxonMobil granted $1 million to climate denial groups in 2014. ExxonMobil granted $10,000 to the Science & Environmental Policy Project founded by climate denial advocate, physicist, and environmental scientist Fred Singer and earlier funded the work of solar physicist Wei-Hock "Willie" Soon, who said that most global warming is caused by solar variation.

From 1989 till April 2010, ExxonMobil and its predecessor Mobil purchased regular Thursday advertorials in The New York Times, The Washington Post, and The Wall Street Journal that said that the science of climate change was unsettled. In 2000, responding to the 2000 US First National Assessment of Climate Change, an ExxonMobil advertorial said "The report's language and logic appear designed to emphasize selective results to convince people that climate change will adversely impact their lives. The report is written as a political document, not an objective summary of the underlying science." Another 2000 advertorial published in The New York Times and The Wall Street Journal entitled "Unsettled Science" said "it is impossible for scientists to attribute the recent small surface temperature increase to human activity."

ExxonMobil announced in 2008 that it would cut its funding to many of the groups that "divert attention" from the need to find new sources of clean energy, although in 2008 still funded over "two dozen other organisations who question the science of global warming or attack policies to solve the crisis." A survey carried out by the UK Royal Society found that in 2005 ExxonMobil distributed US$2.9 million to 39 groups that "misrepresented the science of climate change by outright denial of the evidence".

The Union of Concerned Scientists produced a report titled 'Smoke, Mirrors & Hot Air', that criticizes ExxonMobil for "underwriting the most sophisticated and most successful disinformation campaign since the tobacco industry" and for "funnelling about $16 million between 1998 and 2005 to a network of ideological and advocacy organizations that manufacture uncertainty on the issue". In 2006, Exxon said that it was no longer going to fund these groups though that statement has been challenged by Greenpeace.

To investigate how widespread such hidden funding was, senators Barbara Boxer, Edward Markey and Sheldon Whitehouse wrote to a number of companies. Koch general counsel refused the request and said it would infringe the company's first amendment rights.

=== Funding scientists who are climate change deniers ===
The Greenpeace research project ExxonSecrets, as well as various academics, have linked several scientists who are climate deniers—Fred Singer, Fred Seitz and Patrick Michaels—to organizations funded by ExxonMobil and Philip Morris USA for the purpose of promoting global warming denial. These organizations include the Cato Institute and the Heritage Foundation. Similarly, groups employing global warming deniers, such as the George C. Marshall Institute, have been criticized for their ties to fossil fuel companies.

On 2 February 2007, The Guardian stated that Kenneth Green, a visiting scholar with AEI, had sent letters to scientists in the UK and the U.S., offering US$10,000 plus travel expenses and other incidental payments in return for essays with the purpose of "highlight[ing] the strengths and weaknesses of the IPCC process", specifically regarding the IPCC Fourth Assessment Report.

An analysis conducted by The Carbon Brief in 2011 found that 9 out of 10 of the most prolific authors who cast doubt on climate change or speak against it had ties to ExxonMobil. Greenpeace have said that Koch industries invested more than US$50 million in the past 50 years on spreading doubts about climate change.

== Lobbying against emissions regulations ==
Lee Raymond, Exxon and ExxonMobil chief executive officer from 1993 to 2006, was one of the most outspoken executives in the United States against regulation to curtail global warming,

In February 2001, the early days of the administration of US President George W. Bush, ExxonMobil's head lobbyist in Washington wrote to the White House urging that "Clinton/Gore carry-overs with aggressive agendas" be kept out of "any decisional activities" on the US delegation to the working committees of the United Nations' Intergovernmental Panel on Climate Change (IPCC), and recommending their replacement by scientists critical of the prevailing scientific consensus on climate change. The chairman of the IPCC, climate scientist Robert Watson, was replaced by Rajendra K. Pachauri, who was seen as more industry-friendly. A spokesperson for ExxonMobil said the company did not have a position on the chairmanship of the IPCC.

On June 14, 2005, ExxonMobil announced they would hire Philip Cooney, four days after Cooney resigned as chief of staff of the Council on Environmental Quality in the Bush White House, two days after the non-profit Government Accountability Project released documents which showed that Cooney had edited government scientific reports so as to downplay the certainty of the science behind the greenhouse effect. Thomas Friedman wrote in The New York Times, "Of all the people the Bush team would let edit its climate reports, we have a guy who first worked for the oil lobby denying climate change, with no science background, then went back to work for Exxon. Does it get any more intellectually corrupt than that?"

Some researches say that ExxonMobil's strategy succeeded to delay the world's response to climate change, others are not sure if company's different behavior would have brought a different outcome.

== Acknowledgement of climate change ==
Internal ExxonMobil documents showed that after the company issued its first press statement acknowledging that burning fossil fuels contributes to climate change in 2006, ExxonMobil CEO Rex Tillerson and other company executives sought to diminish public concern about climate change by casting doubt on the severity of climate change impacts.

In 2007, ExxonMobil for the first time disclosed to stockholders the financial risks to profitability of climate change. Even that, however, came only in the form of boilerplate language in their Securities and Exchange Commission Form 10-K citing the threat to operations and earnings posed by "laws and regulations related to environmental or energy security matters, including those addressing alternative energy sources and the risks of global climate change" rather than acknowledging the risks posed by climate change itself or by the company's contribution to it. In January 2007, ExxonMobil vice president for public affairs Kenneth Cohen said "we know enough now—or, society knows enough now—that the risk is serious and action should be taken". On February 13, ExxonMobil CEO Rex W. Tillerson acknowledged that the planet was warming while carbon dioxide levels were increasing, "but in the same speech gave an unalloyed defense of the oil industry and predicted that hydrocarbons would dominate the world's transportation as energy demand grows by an expected 40 percent by 2030. [Tillerson] stated that there is no significant alternative to oil in coming decades, and that ExxonMobil would continue to make petroleum and natural gas its primary products."

In April 2014, ExxonMobil released a report publicly acknowledging climate change risk for the first time. ExxonMobil predicted that a rising global population, increasing living standards and increasing energy access would result in lower greenhouse gas emissions.

ExxonMobil is dismissive of the fossil fuel divestment movement, writing on ExxonMobil's blog in October 2014 that fossil fuel divestment was "out of step with reality" and that "to not use fossil fuels is tantamount to not using energy at all."

Exxon routinely uses an internal shadow price on CO_{2} in its business planning. In December 2015, following similar earlier announcements, Exxon noted that if carbon regulations became a requirement, the best approach would be a carbon tax.

== State and federal investigations ==
As early as 2012 the idea of using RICO laws against the fossil fuel industry, on the model of their use against Big Tobacco, was being considered by some environmental groups. In May 2015 Sheldon Whitehouse put forward the suggestion in The Washington Post. Later the same year, on October 14, Ted Lieu and Mark DeSaulnier wrote to the United States Attorney General (US AG) requesting an investigation into whether ExxonMobil violated any federal laws by "failing to disclose truthful information" about climate change. Asked about the letter by The Guardian, an Exxon spokesperson said "This is complete bullshit. We have a 30 year continuous uninterrupted history of researching climate change..." On October 30, 2015, more than 40 leading US environmental and social justice organizations also wrote to the US AG requesting a federal investigation into ExxonMobil deceiving the public about climate change. Former Vice President Al Gore and all three Democratic primary candidates for President of the United States called for a Department of Justice investigation.

On October 29, Whitehouse, Richard Blumenthal, Elizabeth Warren and Ed Markey issued a letter to Exxon questioning their donations to Donors Trust, a group which funds climate change denial. Subsequently, in January 2016, Marjorie Cohn, law professor at the Thomas Jefferson School of Law in San Diego, California, called for the revocation of ExxonMobil's articles of incorporation.

Still in 2015 Eric Schneiderman, the New York Attorney General, launched an investigation whether ExxonMobil's statements to investors were consistent with the company's decades of extensive scientific research. In October 2018, based on this investigation, ExxonMobil was sued by the State of New York, which claimed the company defrauded shareholders by downplaying the risks of climate change for its businesses.

Following published reports, based on internal Exxon documents, suggesting that during the 1980s and 1990s Exxon used climate research in its business planning but simultaneously argued publicly that the science was unsettled, the California Attorney General began investigating whether ExxonMobil lied to the public or shareholders about the risk to its business from climate change, possible securities fraud, and violations of environmental laws. ExxonMobil denied wrongdoing.

On March 29, 2016, the attorneys general of Massachusetts and the United States Virgin Islands announced investigations. Seventeen attorneys general were cooperating on investigations. Exxon said the investigations were "politically motivated." In June, the attorney general of the United States Virgin Islands agreed to withdraw the subpoena, and ExxonMobil began an action suing the Massachusetts Attorney General Maura Healey. In 2019 the U.S.Supreme Court found in favor of the Massachusetts attorney general and allowed their case against Exxon to move forward. As a result of that decision, Exxon can no longer withhold records that the AG needs for their investigation into whether Exxon concealed that they were cognizant of the fossil fuels contributing to climate change and knowingly misled both the public and their own investors.

== Relations with the Rockefeller family ==
Beginning in 2004, the descendants of John D. Rockefeller Sr., led mainly by his great-grandchildren, through letters, meetings, and shareholder resolutions, attempted to get ExxonMobil to acknowledge climate change, to abandon climate denial, and to shift towards clean energy. In 2013, responding to a shareholder resolution calling for emissions reductions, CEO Rex Tillerson asked, "What good is it to save the planet if humanity suffers?"

In March 2016 the Rockefeller Family Fund announced plans to "eliminate holdings" of ExxonMobil. The Rockefeller Brothers Fund and the Rockefeller Family Fund both backed reports suggesting that ExxonMobil knew more about the threat of global warming than it had disclosed. David Kaiser, grandson of David Rockefeller Sr. and president of the Rockefeller Family Fund, said that the "...company seems to be morally bankrupt." Valerie Rockefeller Wayne, daughter of former Senator Jay Rockefeller, said, "What we would hope from Exxon is that they would admit what they've done -- these decades of denial..." In November 2016 ExxonMobil accused the Rockefeller family of masterminding a conspiracy against the company.

Kaiser wrote in December 2016, "Our criticism carries a certain historical irony. John D. Rockefeller founded Standard Oil, and ExxonMobil is Standard Oil's largest direct descendant. In a sense we were turning against the company where most of the Rockefeller family's wealth was created."

== Other climate change activities ==
Beginning in 2002, ExxonMobil has invested up to US$100m over a ten-year period to establish the Global Climate and Energy Project at Stanford University, which "would focus on technologies that could provide energy without adding to a buildup of greenhouse gases". According to the Union of Concerned Scientists, "The funding of academic research activity has provided the corporation legitimacy, while it actively funds ideological and advocacy organizations to conduct a disinformation campaign."

== Board shakeup ==
In 2021 hedge fund Engine No. 1, a critic of ExxonMobil's climate strategy, seated three board members with backing from major institutional investors. Ric Marshall, executive director at ESG Research at MSCI, said, "It shows not just that there is more seriousness apparent in the thinking among investors about climate change, it's a rebuff of the whole attitude of the Exxon board."

== See also ==
- Business action on climate change
- Effects of climate change
- Fossil fuels lobby
- Merchants of Doubt
- People of the State of New York v. Exxon Mobil Corp.
- The Petroleum Papers
- The Power of Big Oil
- Tobacco industry playbook
