= People v. Exxon Mobil =

2018 New York Supreme Court case

People of the State of New York v. Exxon Mobil Corporation
- Seal of the state of New York
- Court: New York Supreme Court
- Full case name: People of the State of New York v. Exxon Mobil Corporation

People of the State of New York v. Exxon Mobil Corp. was a lawsuit filed on October 24, 2018, in the New York Supreme Court. The suit alleges fraud by Exxon Mobil Corporation to mislead the company's investors about management of risks posed by climate change. On November 15, 2018, the court signed a preliminary conference order scheduling the trial to begin in 2019.

The trial began before Judge Barry Ostrager, with opening statements by both sides. According to the New York Times, the case was "only the second climate change lawsuit to reach trial in the United States." The New York Attorney General dropped two of the four counts regarding civil fraud after admitting there was insufficient evidence to support the charges.

Justice Ostrager found for Exxon Mobil on the remaining counts accusing it of fraud.

== See also ==
- Climate change in the United States
- District of Columbia v. Exxon Mobil Corp.
- ExxonMobil climate change controversy
- Kivalina v. ExxonMobil Corp.
