= Plug-in electric vehicles in Connecticut =

As of July 2023, there were about 36,000 electric vehicles registered in Connecticut. About 25% of vehicles registered in the state between July and December 2021 were electric.

== Government policy ==
As of May 2022, the state government offers tax rebates of up to $4,250 for purchases of electric vehicles.

== Charging stations ==
As of March 2022, the state government offers tax rebates of $500 for home installations of AC level 2 charging stations.

The Infrastructure Investment and Jobs Act, signed into law in November 2021, allocates US$53 million to charging stations in Connecticut.

== By region ==
=== Bridgeport ===
As of December 2021, there were about 1,300 electric vehicles registered in Greenwich, 1,000 in Stamford, and 900 in Westport.

=== New Haven ===
As of April 2024, there were 45 electric vehicles in the New Haven city fleet.
