= Kivalina v. ExxonMobil Corp. =

2008 lawsuit

Kivalina v. ExxonMobil Corporation, et al.
- Court: United States District Court for the Northern District of California
- Full case name: Native Village of Kivalina v. ExxonMobil Corporation, et al.
- Decided: September 30, 2009
- Docket nos.: 4:08-cv-01138
- Citations: Comer v. Murphy Oil USA, Inc., et al.

Holding
- Kivalina claims posed non-justiciable political questions and that the plaintiffs "otherwise lack[ed] standing under Article III of the United States Constitution."

Court membership
- Judge sitting: Saundra Brown Armstrong

Kivalina v. ExxonMobil Corp., No. 4:08-cv-01138 (N.D. Cal.), was a lawsuit filed on February 26, 2008, in a United States district court. The suit, based on the common law theory of nuisance, claims monetary damages from the energy industry for the destruction of Kivalina, Alaska by flooding caused by climate change. The damage estimates made by the U.S. Army Corps of Engineers and the Government Accountability Office are placed between $95 million and $400 million. This lawsuit is an example of greenhouse gas emission liability.

The suit was dismissed by the United States district court on September 30, 2009, on the grounds that regulating greenhouse emissions was a political rather than a legal issue and one that needed to be resolved by Congress and the Administration rather than by courts. An appeal was filed with the Ninth Circuit Court of Appeals in November 2009. In September 2012, the panel of appeals judges decided not to reinstate the case. The city appealed the court of appeals decision to the U.S. Supreme Court and on May 20, 2013 the Supreme Court justices decided not hear the case, effectively ending the city's legal claim.

== Parties ==
=== Plaintiffs ===
- Native Village of Kivalina, Alaska
- City of Kivalina

Attorneys

- Luke W. Cole, Center on Race, Poverty & the Environment
- Brent Newell, Center on Race, Poverty & the Environment
- Heather Kendall Miller, Native American Rights Fund

=== Defendants ===
- ExxonMobil Corporation
- BP P.L.C
- BP America, Inc.
- BP Products North America, Inc.
- Chevron Corporation
- Chevron U.S.A., Inc.
- ConocoPhillips
- Royal Dutch Shell PLC
- Shell Oil Company
- Peabody Energy Corporation
- The AES Corporation
- American Electric Power Company, Inc.
- American Electric Power Services Corporation
- DTE Energy Company
- Duke Energy Corporation
- Dynegy Holdings, Inc.
- Edison International
- Midamerican Energy Holdings Company
- Mirant Corporation
- NRG Energy
- Pinnacle West Capital Corporation
- Reliant Energy, Inc.
- The Southern Company
- Xcel Energy, Inc.

== Village issue ==
Kivalina is a traditional Iñupiat community of about 390 people and is located about 625 miles northwest of Anchorage. It is built on an 8-mile barrier reef between the Kivalina River and the Chukchi Sea.

Sea ice historically protected the village, whose economy is based in part on salmon fishing plus subsistence hunting of whale, seal, walrus, and caribou. But the ice is forming later and melting sooner because of higher temperatures, and that has left it unprotected from fall and winter storm waves and surges that pummel coastal communities.

The village is being wiped out by global warming and needs to move urgently before it is destroyed and the residents become global warming refugees", Kivalina's attorney, Matt Pawa of suburban Boston said. "It's battered by winter storms and if residents don't get some money to move, the village will cease to exist.

In 1953 the size of the village was roughly 54 acres but due to accelerating erosion activity, the village is currently at 27 acres. Due to the dramatic loss of land, Kivalina residents chose a relocation site, an area known as Kiniktuuraq, about two miles southeast of the current location. Before relocating, Kivalina residents are finding out that the new site may be prone to flooding. It has not been mentioned that the flooding will be attributed to climate change in the case.

== Overview ==
According to an attorney of Kivalina, Matt Pawa, Kivalina v. ExxonMobil has two chief aims. The first is to recover "monetary damages for defendants' past and ongoing contributions to global warming"; the second, to recover "damages caused by certain defendants' acts in furthering a conspiracy to suppress the awareness of the link between these emissions and global warming".

The lawsuit accuses some of the defendants of a conspiracy to mislead the public regarding the causes and consequences of climate change. The lawsuit invokes the federal common law of public nuisance. Every entity that contributes to the pollution problem harming Kivalina is liable.

== District Court ruling ==
On September 30, 2009, the United States District Court dismissed the suit filed by Kivalina. The 2nd Circuit ruled that a public nuisance suit brought by states and environmental groups against ExxonMobil Corporation and twenty-three other oil, energy and utility companies based on their business being major producers of carbon dioxide and other greenhouse gas emissions posed a non-justiciable political question (In a court system they only have the authority to hear and decide a legal question, not a political question. Legal questions are deemed to be justiciable, while political questions are non-justiciable), and that the plaintiffs did not have standing, because the problem is abstract and is difficult to pinpoint its source.

Shortly after it came down, Judge Sandra Brown Armstrong in the Northern District of California dismissed the nuisance claims, stating that the plaintiffs did pose non-justiciable under the political question doctrine and that the plaintiffs "otherwise lacked standing under Article III of the United States Constitution." On standing, the Kivalina Court applied the "fairly traceable" standard used in the Comer v. Murphy Oil USA, Inc, but in the Kivalina case Kivalina's injuries were not fairly traceable to GHGs emitted by the defendants. Here too the Court relied on what it determined was a tenuous causal link to find that plaintiffs lacked standing.

Defendants of current climate change cases such as Comer v. Murphy Oil USA and Connecticut v. American Electric Power are using this ruling as a way to support their defense of a lack of claim for the plaintiff and therefore there is no standing per Article III of the Constitution.

== Ninth Circuit Court of Appeals ==
An appeal was filed with the Ninth Circuit Court of Appeals in November 2009. On July 7, 2010, the Washington Legal Foundation filed a brief in the U.S. Court of Appeals for the Ninth Circuit urging it to reject an appeal and that the dismissal be affirmed because the lawsuit lacks standing In November 2011 arguments for and against reinstatement of the case were made before an Appeals Panel. On September 21, 2012, the court published an opinion affirming district court decision. On October 4, 2012, the plaintiffs submitted a petition for rehearing by the court en banc.

== See also ==
- Climate change in the United States
- Massachusetts v. Environmental Protection Agency
- Lujan v. Defenders of Wildlife
