= Economic transparency =

Economic transparency refers to banks and other financial institutions making data available about their financial position and condition. However, the definition depends on the perspective of different research areas through which it is examined, mainly monetary economics, international finance, corporate finance, and others (e.g. public economics, international trade, asset pricing, and labor economics). This can be related to mandatory public reporting by commercial organizations or voluntary disclosure by government institutions such as central banks.

The WTO defines economic transparency as a “degree to which trade policies and practices, and the process by which they are established, are open and predictable.” (WTO’s 2014 glossary). United Nations Conference on Trade and Development (UNCTAD, 2012) relates to transparency as to “a state of affairs in which the participants in the investment process are able to obtain sufficient information from each other in order to make informed decisions and meet obligations and commitments”. According to the National Bureau of Economic Research (NBER) there are three main branches: transparency in economic policy, in the institutional structures surrounding the markets, and in the corporate sector.

Fiscal transparency is perceived to be essential for informed decision making, for guaranteeing some accountability, and for maintaining fiscal discipline. Central banks differ considerably in the ways in which they have become more transparent.

== History ==
Since financial crises in emerging market economies in the 1990s, the 1997 Asian financial crisis among them, weakness of institutions, lack of transparency in actual balance-sheets of firms, unintelligible corporate structures, and incomprehensible financial markets have revealed as a fundamental issue.

The following corporate fraud scandals in the United States and Europe (e.g. Enron, Tyco International, WorldCom) in the early 2000s amplified the importance of this issue even more. Finally, the 2008 financial crisis provoked demands for greater transparency to help improve corporate governance in the United States and other industrialized countries.

== Role of asymmetric information ==
So to consider the need for economic transparency, an asymmetrical distribution of information between different economic agents has to occur. Full transparency may not necessarily mean that all information is complete and publicly accessible, but that there is no asymmetry in distributing private information between those economic actors. Increasing transparency contributes to the reduction of information asymmetries. Transparency concerning quality and intent (or effort) is sometimes referred to as ” ex-ante transparency“ (associated with predictability) whereby ” ex-post transparency“ means transparency of outcomes (associated with accountability).

Two main types of problems resulting from asymmetries are adverse selection and moral hazard problems. The distinction between those two is based on timing: adverse selection regards behavior before a contract takes place whereas moral hazard describes a party’s action after the contract had already been made. The former is a consequence of a lack of information about quality. Varying knowledge of the quality of a product in the goods and services industry is referenced by the „lemons“ problem or described by the situation of both informed and uninformed investors participating in the financial markets. Another example from the labor market is the employer’s paucity of insight into the true prospective employee ‘s abilities. Moral hazard problems occur because of a shortage of information about intent. Then one party might engage in risky behavior or deceiving actions due to the lack of transparency (e.g. insured drivers acting riskier in the traffic). There is one additional problem arising from information asymmetry in information about scarcity of resources. Lack of transparency of prices causes an inefficient allocation of scarce resources.

== Application in a principal-agent relationship ==
A principal-agent relationship is one that agent acts on behalf of the principal. By the reason of different individual objectives, the principle demands the disclosure of information about effort and outcome to assure the agent does not act purely in their own interest. The application of transparency underlying the relationship between employer and employee, investor and firm (owner and manager) or the public and the government has two main objectives: predictability and accountability. Based on information about policy choices (“effort”) and the result (“outcome”) of the government’s (agent’s) decisions the public (”principal“) decides whether to keep or remove them from office. In public policy area the stress is on the “ex-post transparency” in the way that it improves the electorate’s ability to hold the government accountable. “Ex-ante” transparency is not very effective in assessing the government’s actions because the electorate is not familiar with what the optimal policy decisions should be.

== Cost-benefit analysis of transparency ==
Increased transparency can improve an efficient allocation of resources, make governments more accountable, undermine the power of special interests, and thus lead to improved policies and institutions (Glennerster and Shin, 2008, p. 184). Furthermore, ”as improved transparency raises efficiency (especially the efficiency of investment in new technology), it has the potential to raise growth” (Forssbaeck and Oxelheim, 2015, p. 17). It also decreases a firm’s or state’s cost of capital. This has been studied on investing behavior in emerging markets. Whenever there was insufficient transparency and negative information appeared, investors could not distinguish between individual firms and borrowers, thus they departed investments from the entire market. This explanation is also applicable to the 2008 financial crisis. Banks did not have enough information on their partners’ solvency which led to the collapse of the interbank market. In conclusion, countries and companies with transparent policies have lower borrowing costs, get more investment, and are less susceptible to financial crises.

Increasing transparency has many benefits as already stated, but also many costs. The expenses on the supplier‘s/sender’s side are based on production and dissemination. Likewise important are indirect costs of revealing strategic information. On one hand, this allows firms access to their competitors' know-how, thus increasing efficiency and growth in the entire industry. On the other, it implicates loss of competitive advantage and bargaining power which discourages firms to invest in research. Disclosing information might reduce information asymmetries between investors but may reveal sensitive information to rivals. Another example are privacy or integrity costs to the sender. Information like a genetic predisposition for a disease or medical information on family members if provided to insurance companies would streamline the pricing of insurance. However, for many disclosing this type of information would just not be tolerable. Besides these costs, there are so-called incentive effects. If the incentive for the sender is based on the results of (involuntary) monitoring, they make costly actions to (deceitfully) signal abilities. A perfect example of this are CEO compensations derived from the stock value which is impacted by the firm’s signaled ability. Unnecessary expenses of exaggerated signaling eventually lead to reducing the firm’s value. It can be also applicable to government officials’ intentions to signal abilities using public resources.

The receiver/demander needs to process the content of the information which is also costly (proportionately to the preciseness of the information).

Research shows that the marginal benefit of increasing transparency is decreasing. Leuz and Verrecchia (2000) discovered that if transparency reaches a certain point, further disclosure of information has little power on decreasing the firm’s cost of capital. In agreement with that, Plummer and Tafti found that the third world countries, where transparency tends to be underdeveloped, have most to benefit by increasing policy transparency. Some even suggest the marginal benefit is negative beyond a certain point. If imprecise, sharing too much information with the public might cause inefficiency. Let’s say a public body (e.g. a central bank) reveals uncertainty in future decision-making related to a certain commodity. (e.g. interest). The private sector overreacts and volatility in the market for this commodity escalates (Geraats, 2002).

== Socio-economic transparency mechanisms ==
For economic transparency to remedy the asymmetricity, there has to some mechanism for information to be transferred from ”the sender“ (the informed) to ”the receiver“ (the uninformed). Since transparency has a demand-side as well, to increase it the information has to be relevant to the receiver’s decision making. To improve the freedom of choice these mechanisms signal the implications of one’s socioeconomic choices. There are again two engaging parties: the reporter who enters the information into the instrument and the inquirer who searches for information related to socio-economical choices.

Examples:

- publicly available product tests by consumer safety groups
- nutrition information printed on food products (sometimes enforced by official regulations)
- labels, established by governmental or non-governmental organizations (indicating certain “organic” production methods or “fair” salary conditions for producers)
- consumer ratings and reviews on web shops (amazon.com)
- salary comparison web sites (glassdoor.com.)
- classified information disclosing anonymous platforms (wikileaks.org)

All of these mechanisms face the following challenges:

- language - standardized and consensual meaning (e.g. to which companies, people labels in reports relate to in reality)
- inference - ability to filter out and interpret the relevant information for it to be able to satisfy the inquiry (the internet being a typical example of a non-inferring mechanism)
- privacy/anonymity - using middlemen (people or platforms such as wikileaks.org) to keep a reporter's identity private if required
- truth/gaming - dealing with some reporters attempting to game the mechanism or unintentionally entering wrong information (e.g. sending many fake positive reviews to improve the average rating), one of useful tools to overcome this is displaying any discrepancies in input information (in case of one-dimensional product ratings showing the minimum and maximum) or using trustworthiness ratings of reporters

== The US's perspective ==
Transparency and openness can help accelerate reforms in developing countries in situations which foreign aid and other US programmatic and diplomatic efforts will have less potency and influence. It can promote responsible practices that directly and indirectly support a broad range of US policy objectives, such as (1) exposing government corruption, (2) reducing the scope for government revenues to be siphoned offshore, (3) increasing collection of domestic tax revenues, (4) increasing the accountability and effectiveness of government spending (including aid), (5) reducing dependency on foreign aid, and (6) helping to prevent money laundering and terrorist finance.
