= ExxonMobil =

American multinational oil and gas company

ExxonMobil Holdings Corporation

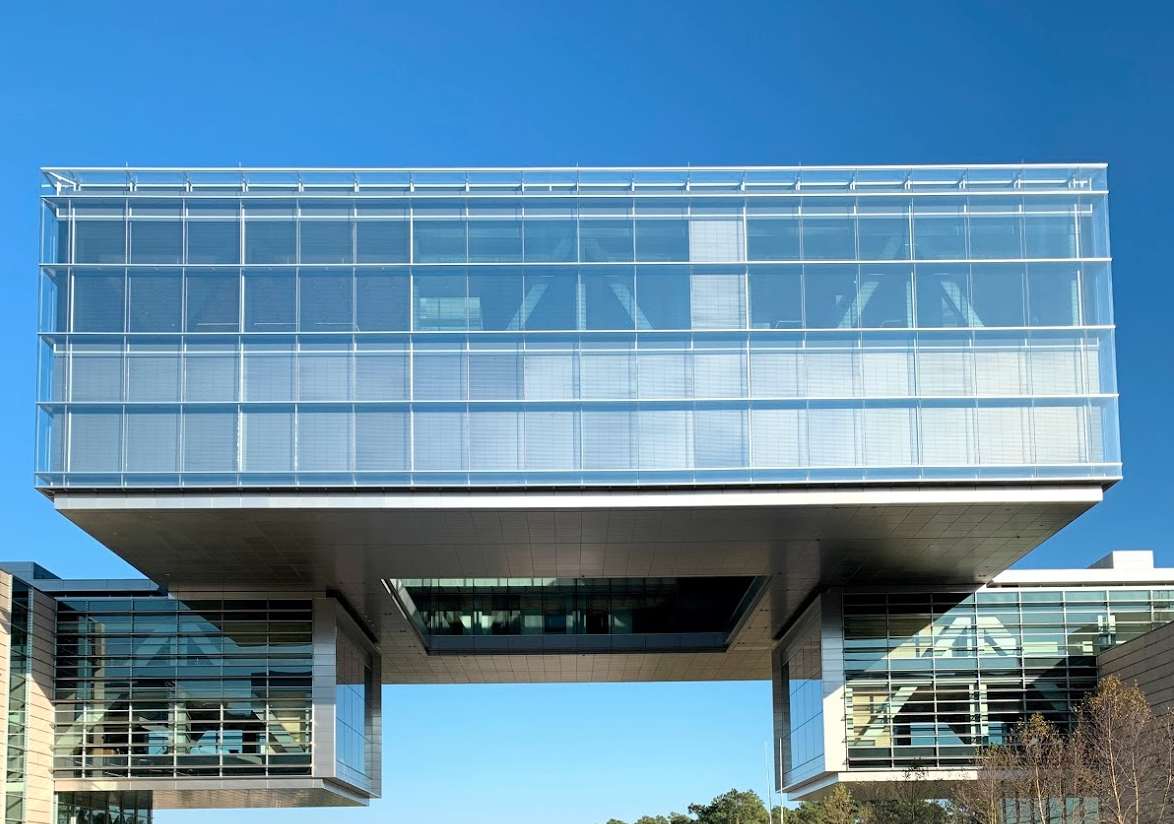
- Floating cube at ExxonMobil headquarters in Spring, Texas
- Trade name: ExxonMobil
- Formerly: Standard Oil Company (New Jersey) (1882–1973); Exxon Corporation (1973–1999); ExxonMobil Corporation (1999–2026)
- Type: Public
- Traded as: NYSE: XOM; S&P 100 component; S&P 500 component
- ISIN: US30231G1022
- Industry: Energy
- Predecessors: Standard Oil; Mobil
- Founded: November 30, 1999; 26 years ago
- Founders: Lucio Noto; Lee Raymond
- Headquarters: Spring, Texas, U.S.
- Area served: Worldwide
- Key people: Darren Woods (chairman & CEO)
- Products: Crude oil; Oil products; Natural gas; Petrochemicals; Power generation
- Brands: Coolanol; Esso; Exxon; Mobil; On the Run; Speedpass; Federal Oil
- Revenue: ▼US$333.7 billion (2025)
- Operating income: ▼US$37.60 billion (2025)
- Net income: ▼US$28.84 billion (2025)
- Total assets: ▼US$449.0 billion (2025)
- Total equity: ▼US$259.4 billion (2025)
- Number of employees: 57,900 (2025)
- Subsidiaries: Exxon Neftegas; ExxonMobil Australia; ExxonMobil Nigeria; Imperial Oil; SeaRiver Maritime; XTO Energy
- Website: corporate.exxonmobil.com

ExxonMobil Holdings Corporation (/ˌɛksɒn ˈmoʊbəl/ EK-son MOH-bəl) is an American multinational oil and gas corporation headquartered in Spring, Texas, a suburb of Houston. Founded as the largest direct successor of John D. Rockefeller's Standard Oil, the company was formed in 1999, with the merger of Exxon and Mobil. It is vertically integrated across the entire oil and gas industry, as well as within its chemicals division, which produces plastic, synthetic rubber, and other chemical products. As the largest U.S.-based oil and gas company, ExxonMobil is the eighth-largest company by revenue in the U.S. and 13th-largest in the world. It is also the largest investor-owned oil company in the world.

The company has been widely criticized and sued, mostly for environmental incidents and its history of climate change denial against the scientific consensus that fossil fuels significantly contribute to global warming. The company is responsible for many oil spills, the largest and most notable of which was the 1989 Exxon Valdez oil spill in Alaska, considered to be one of the world's worst oil spills in terms of environmental damage. The company has also been accused of human rights violations and exerting excessive influence on American foreign policy and developing countries.

In 2024, ExxonMobil was responsible for 610 Mt of CO_{2} emissions, which was 1.58% of global CO_{2} emissions.

== History ==
Originally, Vacuum Oil Company was founded in 1866. It later was acquired by Standard Oil in 1879 and divested from Standard in 1911 with Standard Oil's legally-mandated breakup. In 1931 Vacuum Oil merged with Standard Oil Company of New York (Socony), and the combined company became later known as Mobil.

After the 1911 breakup, Standard Oil continued to exist through its New Jersey subsidiary (Jersey Standard), and retained its name in much of the eastern United States. Jersey Standard grew by acquiring Humble Oil in the 1930s and became the dominant oil company on the world stage. The company's lack of ownership over the Standard Oil name across the United States, however, prompted a name change to unify all of its brands under one name, choosing Exxon in 1972 instead of continuing to use the three distinct brands Esso, Enco, and Humble Oil.

In 1998, the two companies agreed to merge and form ExxonMobil, with the deal closing on November 30, 1999. The new company's name containing both of the trade names of its immediate predecessors. However, the structure of the merger provided that Exxon was the surviving company and bought Mobil, rather than a new company being created. Following the merger, Exxon's NYSE ticker symbol was changed from "XON" to "XOM".

== Operations ==
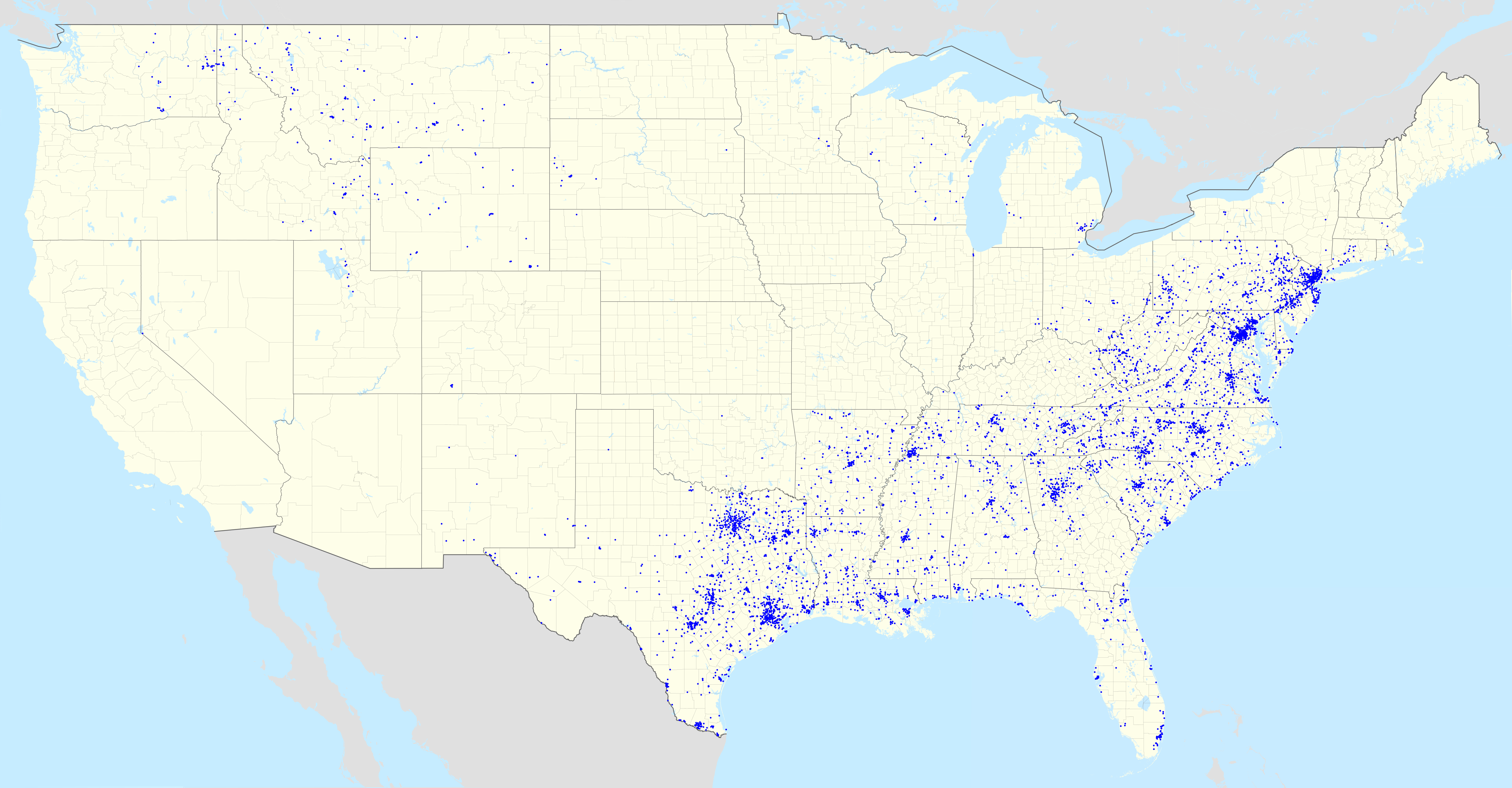
Map of Exxon's footprint in the United States as of August 2011

ExxonMobil is the largest non-government-owned company in the international energy industry and produces about 3% of the world's oil and about 2% of the world's energy.

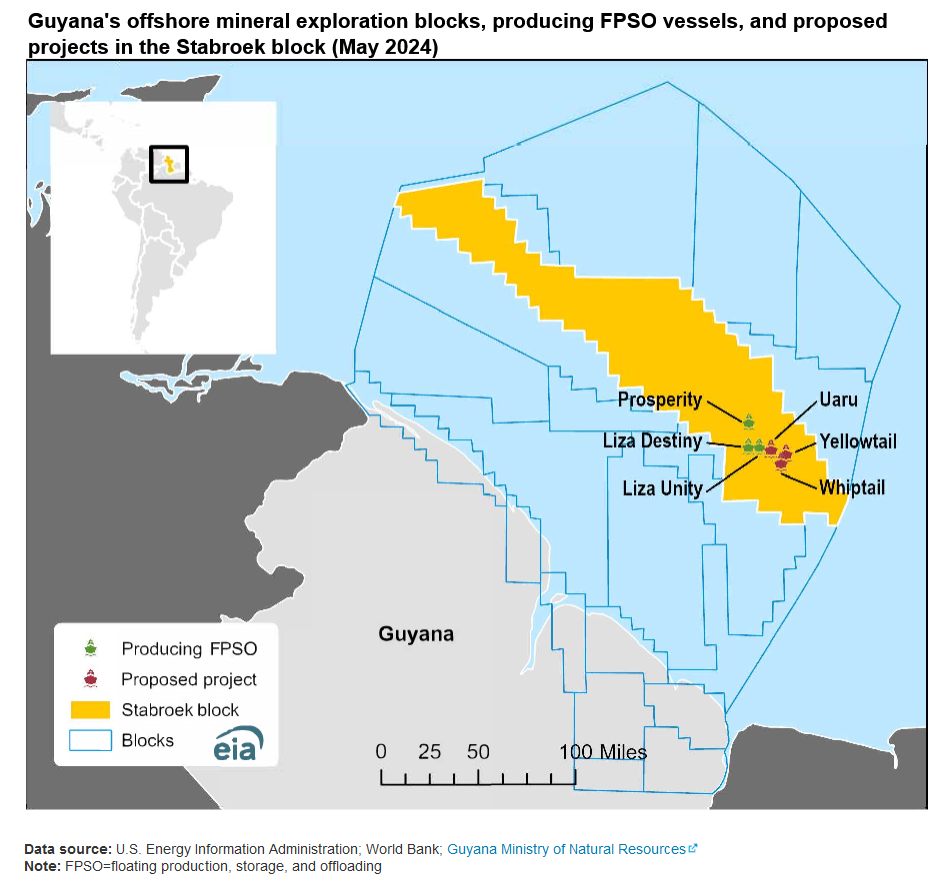
ExxonMobil in Guyana crude oil drills map image offshore regions. Guyana exports around 500,000 barrels per day in offshore regions.

ExxonMobil is vertically integrated into a number of global operating divisions. These divisions are grouped into three categories for reference purposes, though the company also has several standalone divisions, such as Coal & Minerals. It also owns hundreds of smaller subsidiaries such as XTO Energy and SeaRiver Maritime. ExxonMobil also has a majority ownership stake in Imperial Oil.

- Upstream (oil exploration, extraction, shipping, and wholesale operations)
- Product Solutions (downstream, chemical)
- Low Carbon Solutions

=== Upstream ===
The upstream division makes up the majority of ExxonMobil's revenue, accounting for approximately 70% of it. At the end of 2025, ExxonMobil had 19.3 billion oil-equivalent barrels of proved reserves. In the United States, ExxonMobil's petroleum exploration and production activities are concentrated in the Permian Basin, Bakken Formation, Woodford Shale, Caney Shale, and the Gulf of Mexico. ExxonMobil also has gas developments in the regions of Marcellus Shale, Utica Shale, Haynesville Shale, Barnett Shale, and Fayetteville Shale. All natural gas activities are conducted by its subsidiary, XTO Energy. As of December 31, 2014, ExxonMobil owned 14.6 million acres (59,000 km^{2}) in the United States, of which 1.7 million acres (6,900 km^{2}) were offshore, 1.5 million acres (6,100 km^{2}) of which were in the Gulf of Mexico. In California, it has a joint venture called Aera Energy LLC with Shell Oil. In Canada, the company holds 5.4 million acres (22,000 km^{2}), including 1 million acres (4,000 km^{2}) offshore and 0.7 million acres (2,800 km^{2}) of the Kearl Oil Sands Project.

In Argentina, ExxonMobil holds 0.9 million acres (3,600 km^{2}) and 4.9 million acres (20,000 km^{2}) in Germany. In the Netherlands ExxonMobil owns 1.5 million acres (6,100 km^{2}), in Norway it owns 0.4 million acres (1,600 km^{2}) offshore, and the United Kingdom 0.6 million acres (2,400 km^{2}) offshore. In Africa, upstream operations are concentrated in Angola, where it owns 0.4 million acres (1,600 km^{2}) offshore, Chad where it owns 46,000 acres (19,000 ha), Equatorial Guinea, where it owns 0.1 million acres (400 km^{2}) offshore, and Nigeria, where it owns 0.8 million acres (3,200 km^{2}) offshore. In addition, ExxonMobil plans to start exploration activities off the coast of Liberia and the Ivory Coast. ExxonMobil previously had exploration activities in Madagascar, but ended these operations due to unsatisfactory results.

In Asia, it holds 9,000 acres (3,600 ha) in Azerbaijan, 1.7 million acres (6,900 km^{2}) in Indonesia, of which 1.3 million acres (5,300 km^{2}) are offshore, 0.7 million acres (2,800 km^{2}) in Iraq, 0.3 million acres (1,200 km^{2}) in Kazakhstan, 0.2 million acres (810 km^{2}) in Malaysia, 65,000 acres (26,000 ha) in Qatar, 10,000 acres (4,000 ha) in Yemen, 21,000 acres (8,500 ha) in Thailand, and 81,000 acres (33,000 ha) in the United Arab Emirates.

ExxonMobil exited the West Qurna 1 oilfield in January 2024, officially ending all energy sector operations in Iraq. The share is now owned by PetroChina and Pertamina.

In March 2024, ExxonMobil discovered oil at the Stabroek block off the coast of Guyana using a drillship. By the end of 2027, it plans to have 6 FPSOs at the block. Oil was discovered off the coast of Angola in May 2024 in a well drilled from February to April in the Kizomba B development area.

==== Russia operations ====
Until the 2022 Russian invasion of Ukraine, ExxonMobil held 85,000 acres (34,000 ha) in the Sakhalin-I project through its subsidiary Exxon Neftegas. Together with Rosneft, it has developed 63.6 million acres (257,000 km^{2}) in Russia, including the East-Prinovozemelsky field. After Russia's 2022 invasion began, though, ExxonMobil announced it was fully pulling out of both Russia and Sakhalin-I, and launched a lawsuit against Russia's federal government on August 30.

==== Australia operations ====
In Australia, ExxonMobil held 1.7 million acres (6,900 km^{2}), including 1.6 million acres (6,500 km^{2}) offshore. It also operates the Longford Gas Conditioning Plant, and participates in the development of Gorgon LNG project.

==== Papua New Guinea operations ====
In Papua New Guinea, it holds 1.1 million acres (4,500 km^{2}), including the PNG Gas project.

=== Product Solutions ===
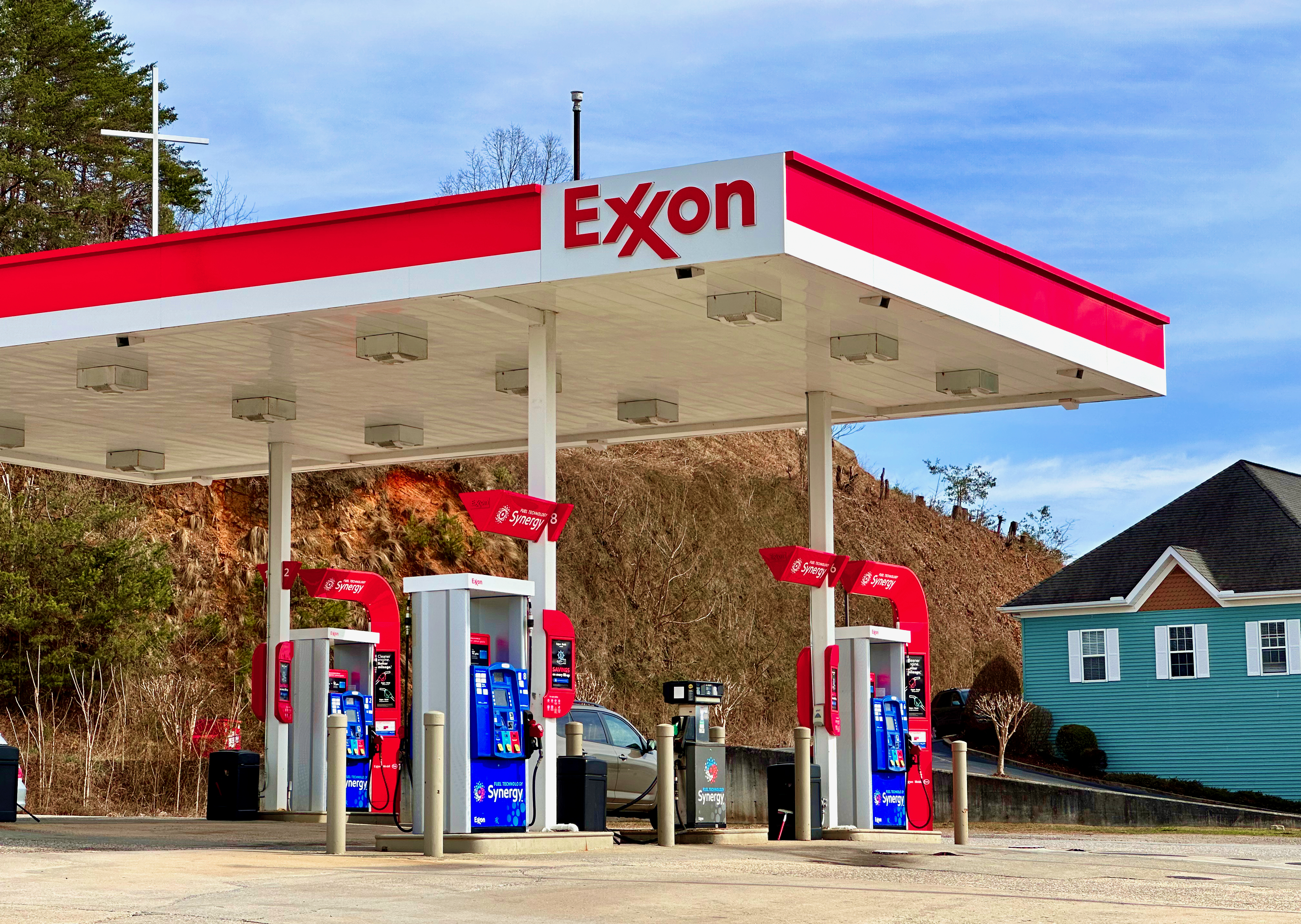
An Exxon-branded gas station in Hiawassee, Georgia

ExxonMobil formed its Product Solutions division in 2022, combining its previously separate Downstream and Chemical divisions into a single company.

On October 1, 2024, Nigeria approved the $1.28 billion sale of Exxon Mobil's onshore assets to Seplat Energy, more than two years after the deal was first agreed upon in February 2022

==== Downstream and retail ====
ExxonMobil markets products around the world under the brands of Exxon, Mobil, and Esso. Mobil is ExxonMobil's primary retail gasoline brand in California, Florida, New York, New England, the Great Lakes, and the Midwest. Exxon is the primary brand in the rest of the United States, with the highest concentration of retail outlets located in New Jersey, Pennsylvania, Texas (shared with Mobil), and in the Mid-Atlantic and Southeastern states. ExxonMobil has stations in 46 states, just behind Shell USA and ahead of Phillips 66, lacking a presence only in Alaska, Hawaii, Iowa, and Kansas.

Outside of the United States, Esso and Mobil are primarily used, with Esso operating in 14 countries and Mobil operating in 29 countries and regions.

In Japan, ExxonMobil had a 22% stake in TonenGeneral Sekiyu K.K., a refining company that merged into Eneos in 2017.

ExxonMobil's primary retail brands worldwide are Exxon, Esso, Mobil, with the former being used exclusively in the United States and the latter two being used in most other countries where ExxonMobil operates. Esso is the only one of its brands not used widely in the United States. Since 2008, Mobil is the only brand for the company lubricants. Since 2018, ExxonMobil has operated a loyalty program, ExxonMobil Rewards+, where customers earn rewards points when filling up at its stations in the United States and later the United Kingdom.

==== Chemicals ====
ExxonMobil Chemical is a petrochemical company that was created by merging Exxon's and Mobil's chemical industries in 1999. Its principal products include basic olefins and aromatics, ethylene glycol, polyethylene, and polypropylene along with speciality lines such as elastomers, plasticizers, solvents, process fluids, oxo alcohols and adhesive resins. The company also produces synthetic lubricant base stocks as well as lubricant additives, propylene packaging films and catalysts. ExxonMobil is the world's largest producer of butyl rubber. Infineum, a joint venture with Shell plc, is manufacturing and marketing crankcase lubricant additives, fuel additives, and specialty lubricant additives, as well as automatic transmission fluids, gear oils, and industrial oils.

==== Sponsorships ====
Mobil 1, a brand of synthetic motor oil, is a major sponsor of multiple racing teams and the official motor oil of NASCAR since 2003. ExxonMobil is currently in partnerships with Oracle Red Bull Racing in Formula One and Kalitta Motorsports.

==== Refineries ====
ExxonMobil operates 21 refineries worldwide, and claims that 80% of its refining capacity is integrated with chemical or lube basestocks. ExxonMobil's largest refinery overall is its Beaumont Refinery and its second largest in the United States is its Baytown Refinery, located in Baytown, Texas. After ExxonMobil committed thousands of violations of federal law at its Baytown facilities between 2005 and 2013, ExxonMobil was ordered to pay $19.95 million (later reduced to $14.25 million), a decision affirmed in 2024 by the Fifth Circuit Court of Appeals.

Its second largest refinery overall is its Jurong Island facility in Singapore. ExxonMobil's global average refining capacity was 4.6 million barrels per day, with the United States producing a plurality of the company's refining capacity at about 1.77 million barrels per day. ExxonMobil's corporate website claims it refines almost 5 million barrels per day.

ExxonMobil was one of few U.S. refiners to expand capacity by a significant margin following an industry downturn suffered during the COVID-19 pandemic. The company completed a 250,000 barrels per day expansion at its Beaumont, Texas, refinery in early 2023.

=== Low Carbon Solutions ===
Officially formed with ExxonMobil's 2022 corporate restructuring, and currently led by former General Motors president Dan Ammann, Low Carbon Solutions is the company's alternative energy division. Low Carbon Solutions conducts research on clean energy technologies, including algae biofuels, biodiesel made from agricultural waste, carbonate fuel cells, and refining crude oil into plastic by using a membrane and osmosis instead of heat. Exxon's work on low-carbon energy projects is a fraction of the $1 billion a year Exxon spends on general research and the $8 billion it has spent since 2000.

As of 2023, the company was in the process of designing its inaugural large-scale plant dedicated to producing low-carbon hydrogen, situated within its refining and petrochemical complex in Baytown, Texas. This project is set to become the world's largest low-carbon hydrogen project.

==== Carbon capture and storage ====
ExxonMobil publicly announced it would be investing $15 billion in what it deemed a "lower carbon future", and claims to be the world leader in carbon capture and storage (CCS). The company additionally plans that its Scope 1 and Scope 2 emissions will be carbon neutral by 2050. ExxonMobil additionally acquired biofuel company Biojet AS in 2022, and its Canadian subsidiary Imperial Oil is moving ahead with plans to produce a renewable diesel biofuel. In July 2023, Exxon agreed to acquire Denbury Resources for $4.9 billion to further its low-carbon efforts. In July 2024, ExxonMobil and CF Industries signed a CCS agreement that will allow ExxonMobil to transport and permanently store 500,000 tonnes of CO_{2} per year starting in 2028.

==== Lithium mining ====
In November 2023 ExxonMobil started drilling for lithium in the US State of Arkansas. In June 2024, a preliminary agreement to supply lithium to SK for the manufacture of lithium-ion batteries that will power electric vehicles was signed.

=== Acquisition of Pioneer Natural Resources ===
In a nearly $60 billion all-stock deal announced in October 2023 and completed in May 2024 following U.S. antitrust review, ExxonMobil acquired Pioneer Natural Resources, more than doubling its holdings in the Permian Basin. The acquisition created one of the largest unconventional oil and gas development positions in the region. When the deal was announced in 2023, the New York Times called it "a bet that U.S. energy policy will not move against fossil fuels in a major way".

== Controversies ==
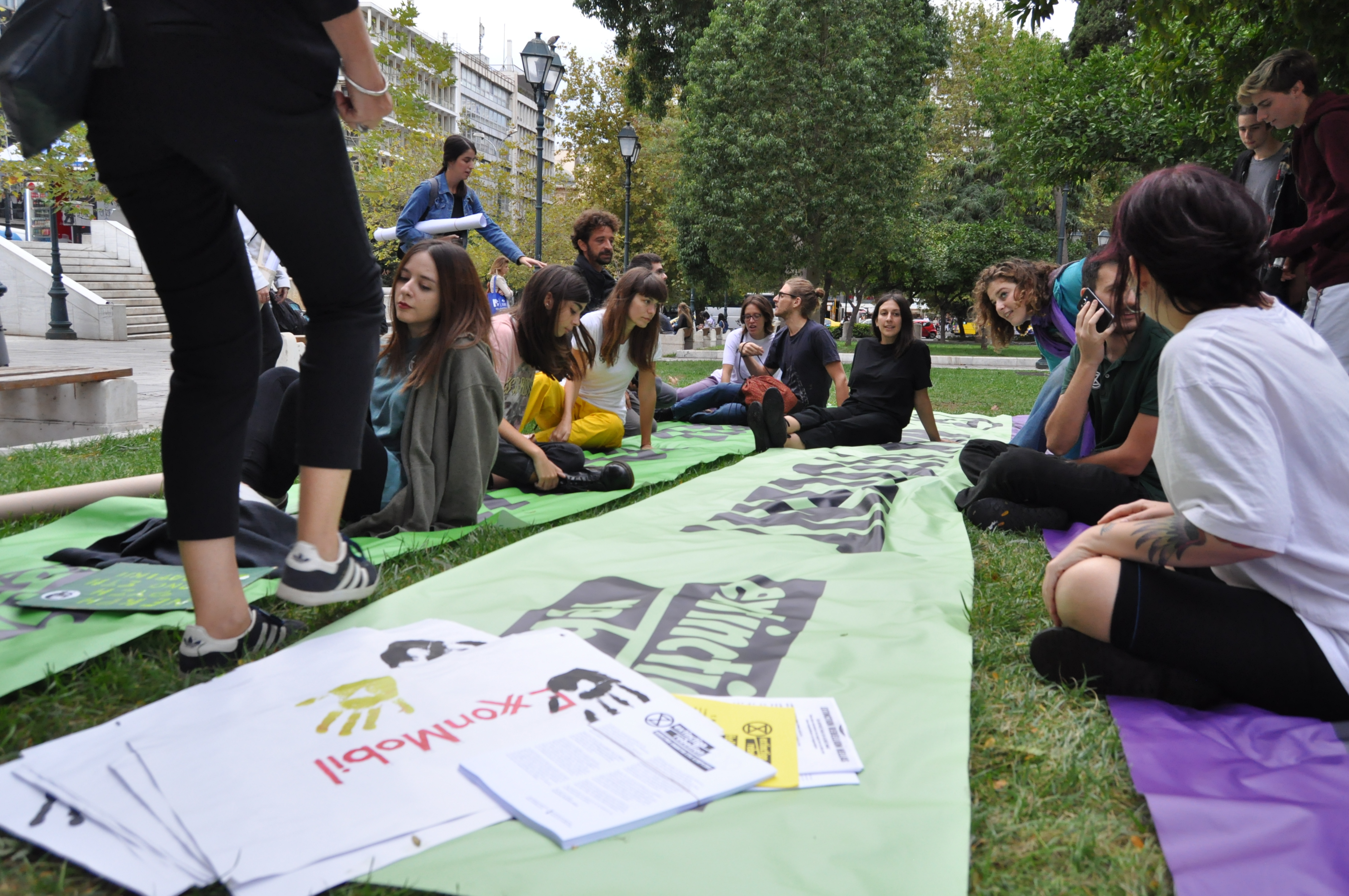
Extinction Rebellion protestors demonstrating against ExxonMobil

=== Climate change denial ===
ExxonMobil's environmental record has faced much criticism for its stance and impact on global warming. In 2018, the Political Economy Research Institute ranks ExxonMobil tenth among American corporations emitting airborne pollutants, thirteenth by emitting greenhouse gases. A 2017 report places ExxonMobil as the fifth largest contributor to greenhouse gas emissions from 1988 to 2015. As of 2005, ExxonMobil had committed less than 1% of its profits towards researching alternative energy, which, according to the advocacy organization Ceres, is less than other leading oil companies. According to the 2021 Arctic Environmental Responsibility Index (AERI), ExxonMobil is ranked as the sixth most environmentally responsible company among 120 oil, gas, and mining companies involved in resource extraction north of the Arctic Circle. As of 2020, ExxonMobil has been responsible for more than 3,000 oil spills and leakages which resulted in a loss of more than one barrel of oil, with the most in a single year being 484 spills in 2011. Additionally, since 1965, ExxonMobil has released more than 40 billion tons of carbon dioxide pollution.

In 2023, Science journal published a paper reporting that the global warming projections and models created by ExxonMobil's own scientists between 1977 and 2003 had "accurately" projected and "skillfully" modeled global warming due to fossil fuel burning, and had reasonably estimated how much CO_{2} would lead to dangerous warming. The authors of the paper concluded: "Yet, whereas academic and government scientists worked to communicate what they knew to the public, ExxonMobil worked to deny it."

Between the 1980s and 2014, ExxonMobil was a notable denier of climate change, though the company officially changed its position in 2014 to acknowledge the existence of climate change. ExxonMobil's prolonged response incited the creation of the Exxon Knew movement, which aims to hold the company accountable for various climate-related incidents. ExxonMobil has used its own website to attack Exxon Knew.

In December 2022, U.S. House Oversight and Reform Committee Chair Carolyn Maloney and U.S. House Oversight Environment Subcommittee Chair Ro Khanna sent a memorandum to all House Oversight and Reform Committee members summarizing additional findings from the committee's investigation into the fossil fuel industry disinformation campaign to obscure the role of fossil fuels in causing global warming. Upon reviewing internal company documents, they accused ExxonMobil along with BP, Chevron, and Shell of greenwashing their Paris Agreement carbon neutrality pledges while continuing long-term investment in fossil fuel production and sales, for engaging in a campaign to promote the use of natural gas as a clean energy source and bridge fuel to renewable energy, and of intimidating journalists reporting about the companies' climate actions and of obstructing the committee's investigation, which ExxonMobil, Shell, and the American Petroleum Institute denied.

In the United States, as of 2024, dozens of states and localities have sued ExxonMobil on the base of its climate change denial.

=== Oil spills and plastic pollution ===
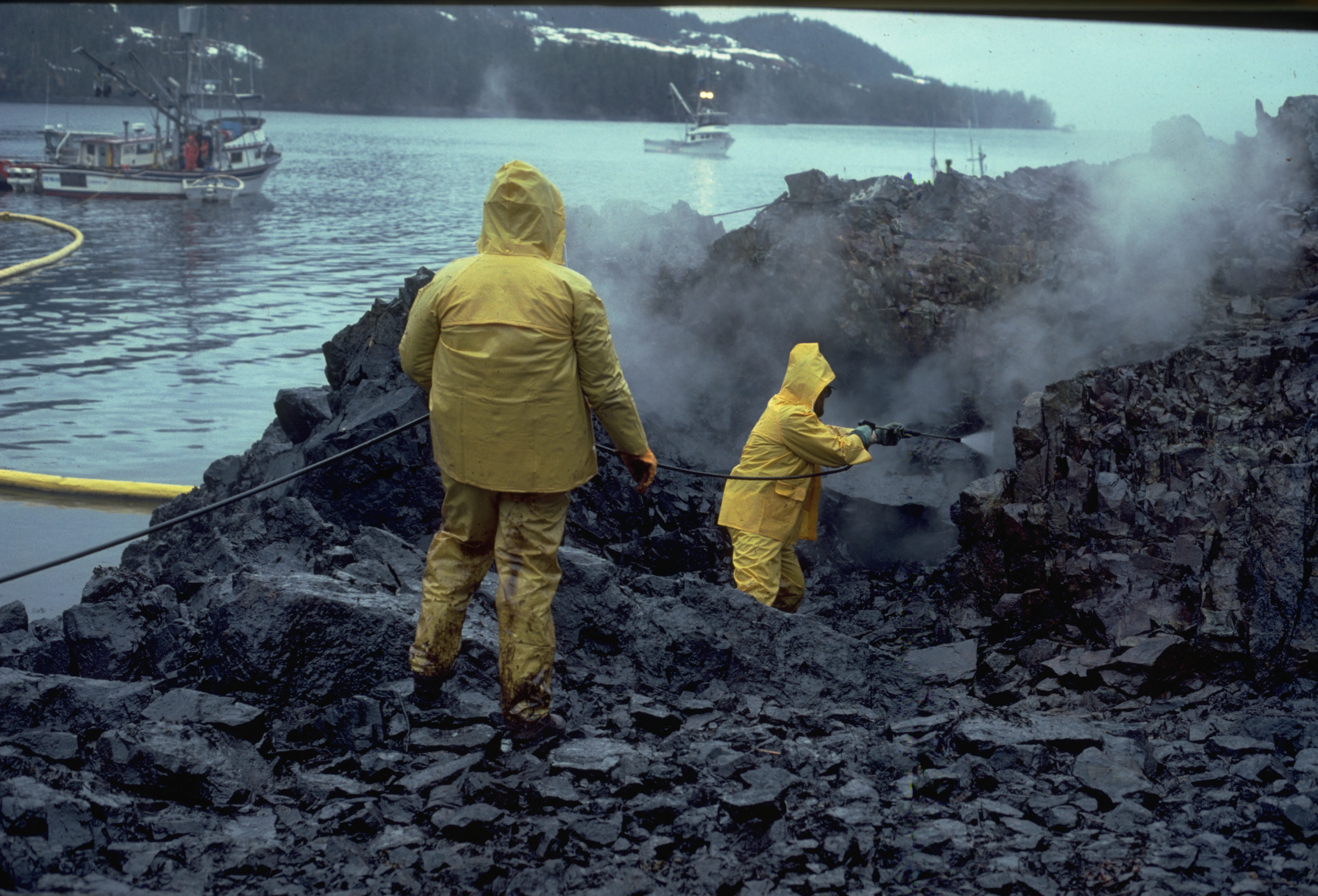
Exxon Valdez oil spill cleanup

ExxonMobil's operations have been subject to numerous oil spills both before and after the 1999 merger. The most widely publicized oil spill was the 1989 Valdez oil spill, where an Exxon tanker discharged approximately 11 million U.S. gallons (42,000 m3) of oil into Prince William Sound, oiling 1,300 miles (2,100 km) of the remote Alaskan coastline. The spill remains the second largest in American history, only trailing BP's Deepwater Horizon spill in the Gulf of Mexico.

ExxonMobil was also responsible for various other oil spills across the world. Some of Exxon's largest and most notable oil spills in the United States include long-lasting oil leaks totaling into an estimated 30 million gallon spill into New York City's Newtown Creek over the course of a century by Exxon and other Standard Oil predecessors, a 2011 oil spill which leaked 1,500 barrels of oil into the Yellowstone River (resulting in about $135 million in damages), and a 2012 1,900 barrel (80,000 gallon) spill from the company's Baton Rouge Refinery in the rivers of Pointe Coupee Parish, Louisiana. ExxonMobil's actives in Louisiana in particular, especially its Baton Rouge Refinery, have given the area the nickname of Cancer Alley. The company's activities, along with other operations and refineries in the area, have been the source of increased cancer infections, lower air quality, and as seen by some, potential environmental racism committed by the company.

In May 2021, ExxonMobil topped the Plastic Waste Makers Index report published by the Minderoo Foundation of 20 petrochemical companies that manufactured 55 percent of the single-use plastic waste in the world in 2019 (which were part of a larger group of 100 petrochemical companies that manufactured 90 percent of the waste), while in April 2022, California Attorney General Rob Bonta issued a subpoena to ExxonMobil for information related to the company's role in overstating the effectiveness of plastic recycling in reducing plastic pollution as part of an industry campaign to promote plastic usage. On September 23, 2024, California Attorney General Rob Bonta filed a lawsuit in San Francisco County Superior Court against ExxonMobil on behalf of the state of California, alleging that the company carried out a "decades-long campaign of deception" and misled the public on the merits of plastic recycling; in response ExxonMobil said that California has an ineffective recycling system that officials have known about for decades.

=== Geopolitical influence and human rights violations ===
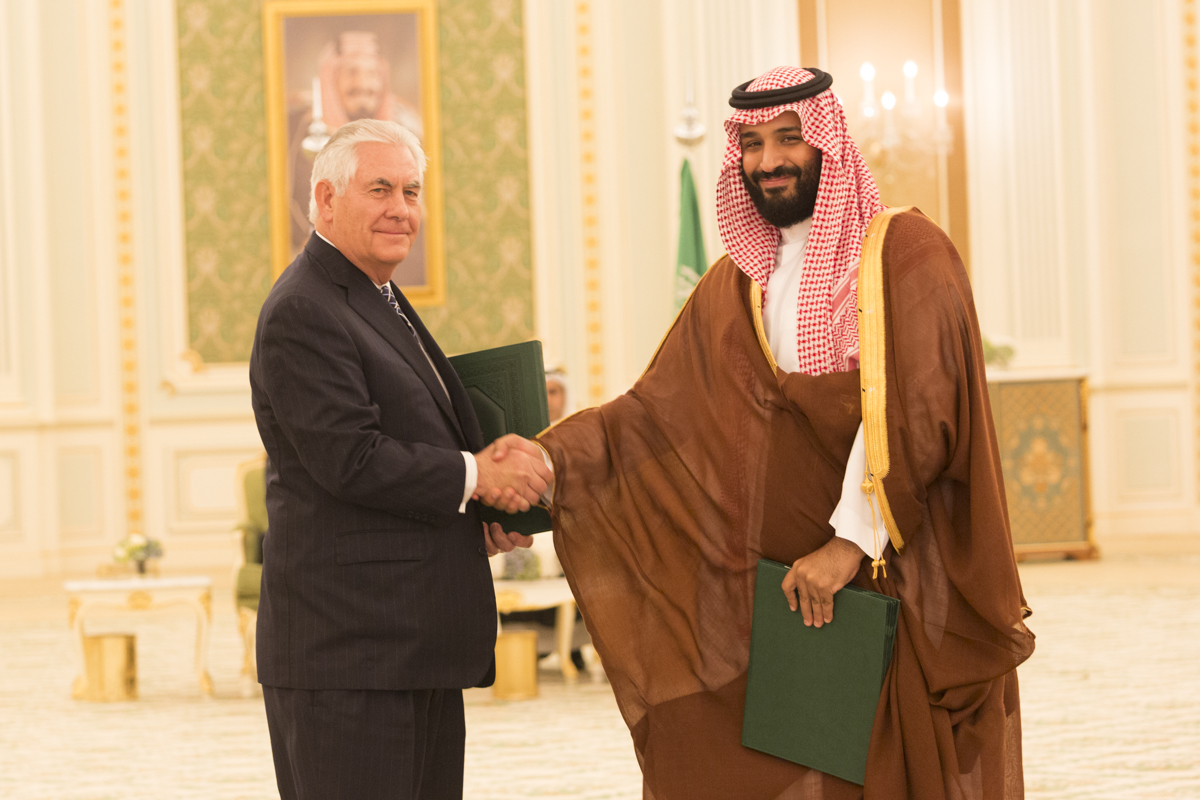
Former CEO Rex Tillerson as US Secretary of State, with Saudi Crown Prince Mohammed bin Salman, May 2017

ExxonMobil has also been accused of human rights violations and abusing its geopolitical influence. In the book Private Empire by Steve Coll, ExxonMobil is described as extremely powerful "corporate state within the American state" in dealing with the countries in which it drills, going to the point as describing such countries' governments as "constrained". The company's corporate ancestors are also blamed for the outbreak of the 1954 Jebel Akhdar War, which was sparked by the Iraq Petroleum Company's activities.

==== Indonesia ====
Beginning in the late 1980s, ExxonMobil (through predecessor Mobil) hired military units of the Indonesian National Army to provide security for its gas extraction and liquefaction project in Aceh, Indonesia, and these military units were accused of committing human rights violations, including sexual assault, battery, and unlawful detention. ExxonMobil eventually pulled out from Indonesia completely in 2001, while denying any wrongdoing. Exxon attempted to have the case dismissed nine times, dragging the lawsuit out for over 20 years. In July 2022, a US District Court denied ExxonMobil's motions to dismiss the case, clearing the way for the lawsuit to go to trial, although no trial date was set. In 2023, ExxonMobil settled the case a week before trial.

=== Other controversies ===
==== War profiteering allegations ====
During a 2022 surge in profits among ExxonMobil and other large oil companies, partly due to the war in Ukraine, U.S. President Joe Biden criticized ExxonMobil. In June 2022, amid record oil prices, he said that "Exxon made more money than God this year". When the oil giant reported its second quarter earnings in 2022, CNN reported that Exxon made US$2,245.62 per second in profit across the 92-day long second quarter.

==== Exposure to benzene ====
In May 2024, a Pennsylvania jury found ExxonMobil liable for negligently failing to warn about the health risks of benzene, which is classified by the US Environmental Protection Agency as a known carcinogen, and ordered the company to pay $725.5 million in compensatory damages to a former mechanic, Paul Gill, who claimed that his cancer was caused by exposure to benzene in ExxonMobil's petroleum products while working at a Mobil gas station between 1975 and 1980.

== Corporate affairs ==
Big Oil companies (2021) (Note: Data is based on the 2022 Fortune 500.)
Company	Revenue (USD bn)	Profit (USD bn)	Brands
ExxonMobil	286	23	Mobil; Esso; Imperial Oil
Shell plc	273	20	Jiffy Lube; Pennzoil
TotalEnergies	185	16	Elf Aquitaine; SunPower
BP	164	7.6	Amoco; Aral AG
Chevron	163	16	Texaco; Caltex; Havoline
Marathon	141	10	ARCO
Phillips 66	115	1.3	76; Conoco; JET
Valero	108	0.9	—N/a
Eni	77	5.8	—N/a
ConocoPhillips	48.3	8.1	—N/a

=== Business trends ===
According to Fortune Global 500, ExxonMobil was the second largest company, second largest publicly held corporation, and the largest oil company in the United States by 2017 revenue. For the fiscal year 2020, ExxonMobil reported a loss of US$22.4 billion, with an annual revenue of US$181.5 billion, a decline of 31.5% over the previous fiscal cycle. In 2025, ExxonMobil reported $6.5 billion in earnings in Q4 and a total earning for the year of $28.8 billion. The company also gave back $37.2 billion that year to shareholders through dividends and buybacks.

The key trends of ExxonMobil are (as at the financial year ending December 31):

As per Fortune 500 Global list, ExxonMobil has been ranked #7 company in the World.

Year	Revenue (US$ bn)	Net income/ loss (US$ bn)	Total assets (US$ bn)	Price per share (US$)	Employees
2008	477	45.2	228	82.68	79,900
2009	310	19.2	233	70.95	80,700
2010	383	30.4	302	64.99	83,600
2011	486	41,0	331	79.71	82,100
2012	480	44.8	333	86.53	76,900
2013	438	32.5	346	90.50	75,000
2014	411	32.5	349	97.27	75,300
2015	249	16.1	336	82.82	73,500
2016	208	7.8	330	86.22	71,100
2017	244	19.7	348	81.86	69,600
2018	290	20.8	346	79.96	71,000
2019	264	14.3	362	73.73	74,900
2020	181	−22.4	332	44.52	72,000
2021	285	23.0	338	57.96	63,000
2022	413	55.7	369	110.30	62,300
2023	344	36.0	376		61,500
2024	350	33.6	453		
2025	332	28.8	449		

=== Headquarters and offices ===
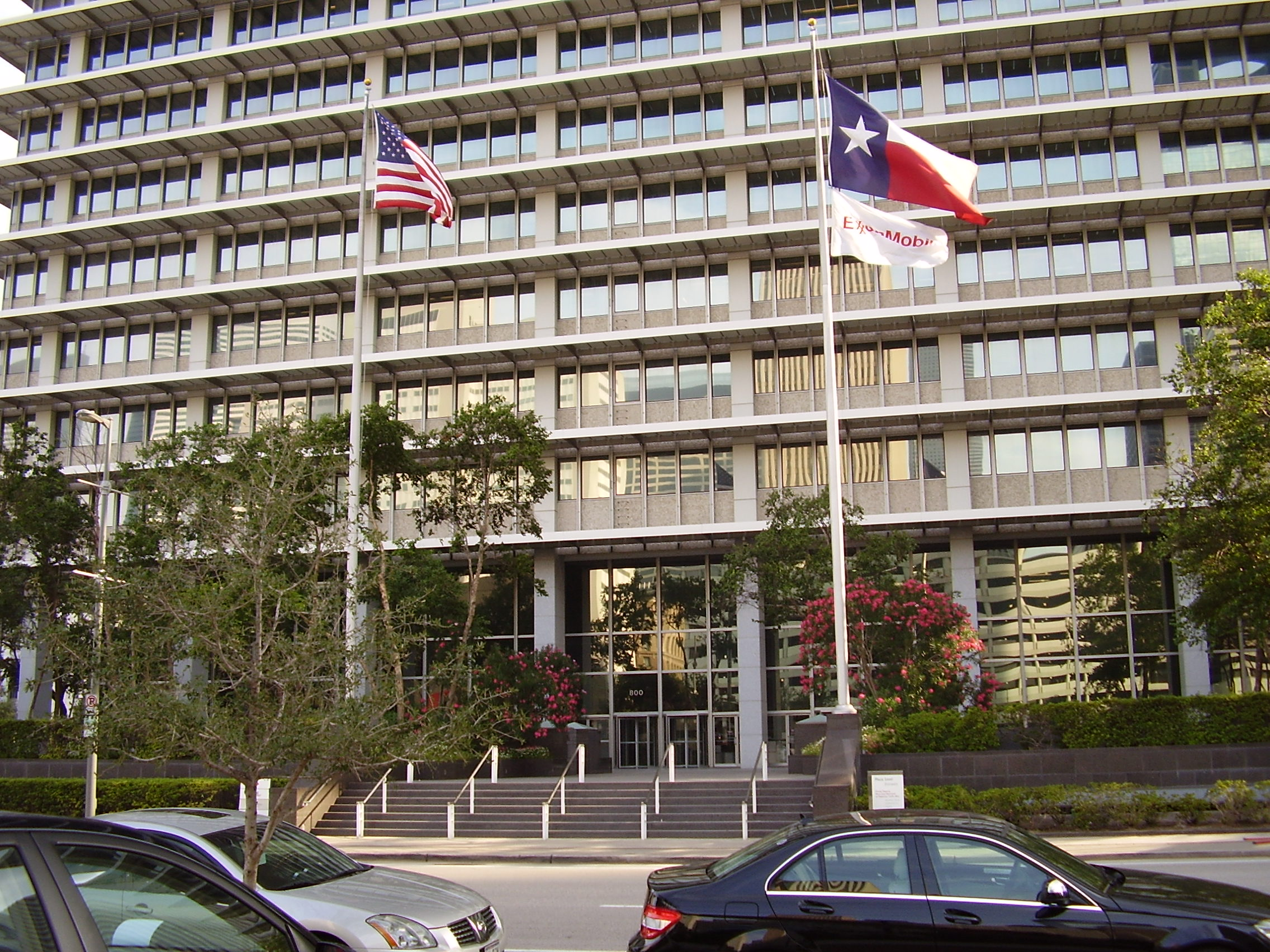
ExxonMobil Building. Former ExxonMobil offices in Downtown Houston were vacated in early 2015.

ExxonMobil's headquarters are located in the Spring, Texas area, a suburb of Houston. The ExxonMobil campus has a Spring post office address, and is adjacent to, but not in, the Spring census-designated place. Paul Takahashi of the Houston Chronicle described the headquarters as being in Spring.

The headquarters was previously in Irving. The company decided to consolidate its Houston operations into one new campus located in northern Harris County and vacate its offices on 800 Bell St. which it had occupied since 1963. The decision came in 2022. The new operation complex was master planned and designed by Pickard Chilton and includes twenty office buildings totaling 3,000,000 square feet (280,000 m^{2}), a wellness center, laboratory, and three parking garages. It is designed to house nearly 10,000 employees.

In September 2025, ExonMobil announced a lay off of 2,000 workers globally as part of a restructuring plan.

The Fife Ethylene Plant located in Scotland was closed; production ended in January 2026.

=== Board of directors ===
The current chairman of the board and CEO of ExxonMobil Corp. is Darren W. Woods. Woods was elected chairman of the board and CEO effective January 1, 2017, after the retirement of former chairman and CEO Rex Tillerson. Before his election as chairman and CEO, Woods was elected president of ExxonMobil and a member of the board of directors in 2016.

As of January 8, 2025, the current ExxonMobil board members are:

- Michael J. Angelakis, chair and chief executive officer of Atairos Group Inc.
- Angela Braly, former president and CEO of WellPoint (now Anthem)
- Maria S. Dreyfus, CEO and Founder of Ardinall Investment Management
- John D. Harris II, former CEO, Raytheon International, Inc.
- Kaisa H. Hietala, board professional
- Joseph L. Hooley, former chair, president and CEO of State Street
- Steven A. Kandarian, chair, president and CEO of MetLife
- Alexander A. Karsner, senior strategist at X Development
- Lawrence W. Kellner, former CEO, COO, and Chair of Continental Airlines
- Dina Powell McCormick, BDT & MSD Partners, LLC
- Jeffrey W. Ubben, Founder, Portfolio Manager, and Managing Partner, Inclusive Capital Partners, L.P.
- Darren W. Woods, chair of the board and CEO, ExxonMobil Corporation

Hooley is presently the lead independent director, having succeeded former Merck CEO Kenneth Frazier upon his retirement in May 2022.

=== Key executives ===
ExxonMobil's key executives are:

- Darren Woods, chairman and CEO
- Neil Chapman, Senior Vice President
- Neil Hansen, CFO and Senior Vice President
- Jack Williams, Senior Vice President
- Jeffrey Taylor, General Counsel and Secretary

== See also ==
- Litigation involving ExxonMobil:
  - Connecticut v. ExxonMobil
  - Exxon Corp. v Exxon Insurance Consultants International Ltd
  - Kivalina v. ExxonMobil
  - People of the State of New York v. ExxonMobil

== Bibliography ==
- Form 10-K 2018: Exxon Mobil Corporation, Form 10-K for fiscal year ended December 31, 2018 (XBRL) (Report). U.S. SEC. February 27, 2019.
- Form 10-K 2022: Exxon Mobil Corporation, Form 10-K for fiscal year ended December 31, 2022 (XBRL) (Report). U.S. SEC. February 22, 2023.
- Form 10-K 2023: Exxon Mobil Corporation, Form 10-K for fiscal year ended December 31, 2023 (XBRL) (Report). U.S. SEC. February 28, 2024.
- Form 10-K 2024: Exxon Mobil Corporation, Form 10-K for fiscal year ended December 31, 2024 (XBRL) (Report). U.S. SEC. February 19, 2025.
- Form 10-K 2025: Exxon Mobil Corporation, Form 10-K for fiscal year ended December 31, 2025 (XBRL) (Report). U.S. SEC. February 18, 2026.
- Bender, Rob, and Tammy Cannoy-Bender. An Unauthorized Guide to: Mobil Collectibles – Chasing the Red Horse. Atglen, Pennsylvania: Schiffer Publishing Co., 1999.
- Exxon Corp. Century of Discovery: An Exxon Album. 1982.
- Gibb, George S., and Evelyn H. Knowlton. The Resurgent Years, 1911–1927: History of Standard Oil Co. (New Jersey). New York: Harper & Brothers Publishers, 1956.
- Hidy, Ralph W., and Muriel E. Hidy. Pioneering in Big Business, 1882–1911: History of Standard Oil Co. (New Jersey). New York: Harper & Brothers Publishers, 1955.
- Larson, Henrietta M., and Kenneth Wiggins Porter. History of Humble Oil & Refining Co.: A Study in Industrial Growth. New York: Harper & Brothers Publishers, 1959.
- Larson, Henrietta M., Evelyn H. Knowlton, and Charles S. Popple. New Horizons, 1927–1950: History of Standard Oil Co. (New Jersey). New York: Harper & Row, 1971.
- McIntyre, J. Sam. The Esso Collectibles Handbook: Memorabilia from Standard Oil of New Jersey. Atglen, Pennsylvania: Schiffer Publishing Co., 1998.
- Sampson, Anthony. The Seven Sisters: The 100-year Battle for the World's Oil Supply. New York: Bantom Books, 1991.
- Standard Oil Co. (New Jersey). Ships of the Esso Fleet in World War II. 1946.
- Tarbell, Ida M. All in a Day's Work: An Autobiography.. New York: The MacMillan Co., 1939.
- Tarbell, Ida M., and David Mark Chalmers. The History of the Standard Oil Co.. New York: Harper & Row, 1966.
- Wall, Bennett H. Growth in a Changing Environment: A History of Standard Oil Co. (New Jersey) 1950–1972 and Exxon Corp. (1972–1975). New York: McGraw-Hill Book Co., 1988.
- Yergin, Daniel. The Prize: The Epic Quest for Oil, Money, and Power. New York: Simon & Schuster, 1991.
