= Dayville, Connecticut =

Dayville, Connecticut may refer to:

- Dayville (CDP), Connecticut, a census-designated place
- Dayville Historic District, a historic district within the CDP
