= Elliottville =

Elliottville may refer to:

== Places ==
=== United States ===
- Elliottville, Staten Island, New York
- Elliottville Lower Mill, Connecticut
- Elliottville, Kentucky

== See also ==
- Ellicottville, New York
