= Daniel's Village Archeological Site =

Archaeological site in Connecticut, United States

- U.S. National Register of Historic Places
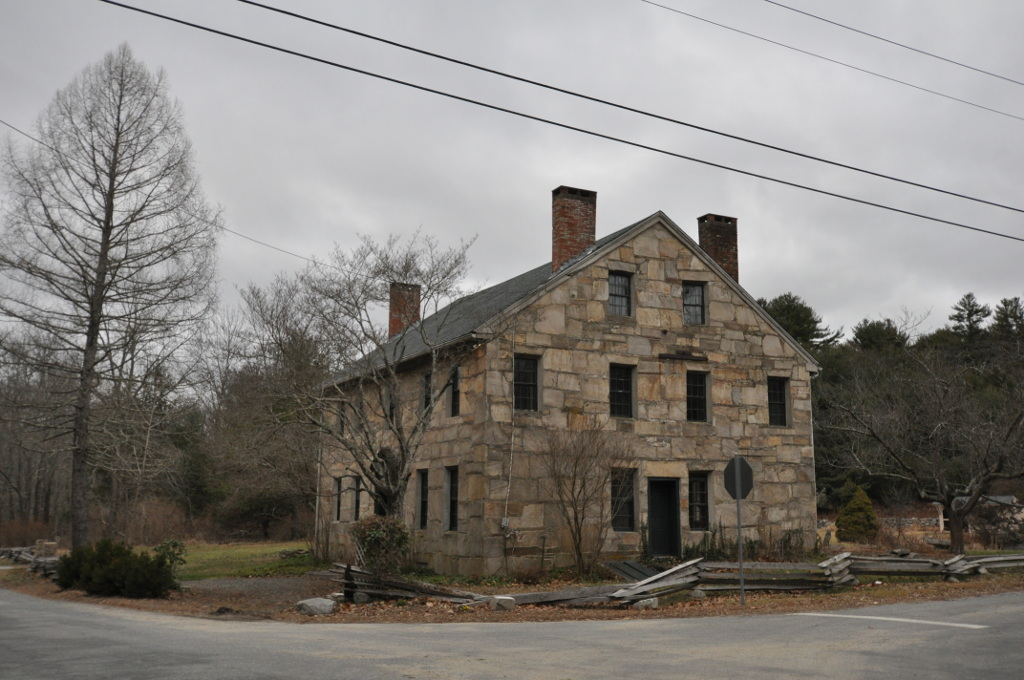
- Stone house

- Location within Connecticut Location within the United States
- Location: Killingly, Connecticut
- Coordinates: 41°52′59″N 71°51′3″W
- Built: 1760
- Architectural style: Georgian
- NRHP reference No.: 78002861
- Added to NRHP: March 30, 1978

The Daniel's Village Archeological Site is a historic industrial archaeological site in Killingly, Connecticut. Located in the vicinity of the crossing of Putnam Road and the Five Mile River, the area is the site of one of the earliest textile mills in Connecticut. The mills burned in 1861 and were not rebuilt, ending the village's economic reason to exist. The site was added to the National Register of Historic Places in 1978. The entire site was purchased in 2015 by a historic building expert who has put the original parcel back together. It is now private property.

The area was settled in the early 18th-century, and has an industrial history dating to the 18th century, when a gristmill known as Talbot's Mill was operating at the site. In 1814, local landowners combined with investors from Rhode Island to establish a cotton mill at the site. It was first known as Howe's Factory, after its managers, and was acquired by the Daniels family in 1845. By this time, the village had grown to include a store, blacksmith's shop, at least nine buildings for worker housing, and three separate mill buildings. The mill buildings burned in 1861, and were not rebuilt. The Daniels family sold the property in 1888, and its remnants were reduced to ruins by the early 20th century.

Visible elements of the site include the early 19th century stone dam, and the stone house at the corner of Putnam and Stone Roads. The house was built after the 1814 purchase, and is basically Georgian in style, with a gabled roof and five-bay main facade. Also found at the site are foundational remnants of the mill, including portions of the tailraces of both the grist and cotton mills. Arrayed near the stone house are foundational remains of some of the worker housing.

== See also ==
- National Register of Historic Places listings in Windham County, Connecticut
