= Connecticut World War II Army Airfields =

Connecticut World War II Army Airfields
- Part of World War II
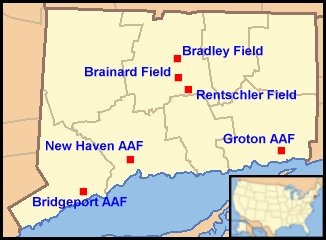
- Locations of major World War II USAAF Airfields in Connecticut

Site information
- Type: Army Airfields
- Controlled by: United States Army Air Forces

Site history
- Built: 1940-1944
- In use: 1940-present

Garrison information
- Garrison: First Air Force; Army Air Force Training Command

During World War II, Connecticut was a major United States Army Air Forces (USAAF) training center for pilots and aircrews.

The USAAF established Six major airfields under the command of First Air Force, headquartered at Mitchel Army Airfield, New York between 1943 and 1945.

The mission of these bases was primarily training of aircrews by Army Air Forces Training Command.

It is still possible to find remnants of these wartime airfields as most were converted into municipal airports. Hundreds of the temporary buildings that were used survive today, and are being used for other purposes.

== Air Fields ==
- Bradley Field, 2 miles west of Windsor Locks

Now: Bradley International Airport (BIAP), Bradley Air National Guard Base (BANGB)

- Brainard Field, 2 miles south-southeast of Hartford

Now: Hartford-Brainard Airport (HFD)

- Bridgeport Army Air Field, 3 miles southeast of Stratford

Now: Sikorsky Memorial Airport (BDR)

- Groton Army Air Field, 3 miles southeast of Groton

Now: Groton-New London Airport (GON)

- New Haven Army Air Field, 3 miles southeast of New Haven

Now: Tweed New Haven Regional Airport (HVN)

- Rentschler Field, 3 miles east-southeast of Hartford

Was: Rentschler Field (airport) (1933-1997)
Now: Rentschler Heliport (CT88) and Rentschler Field (football stadium)

== See also ==
- First Air Force
- United States Army Air Forces
