= Dayville (CDP), Connecticut =

Census-designated place in Connecticut, United States

Dayville, Connecticut
- Census-designated place
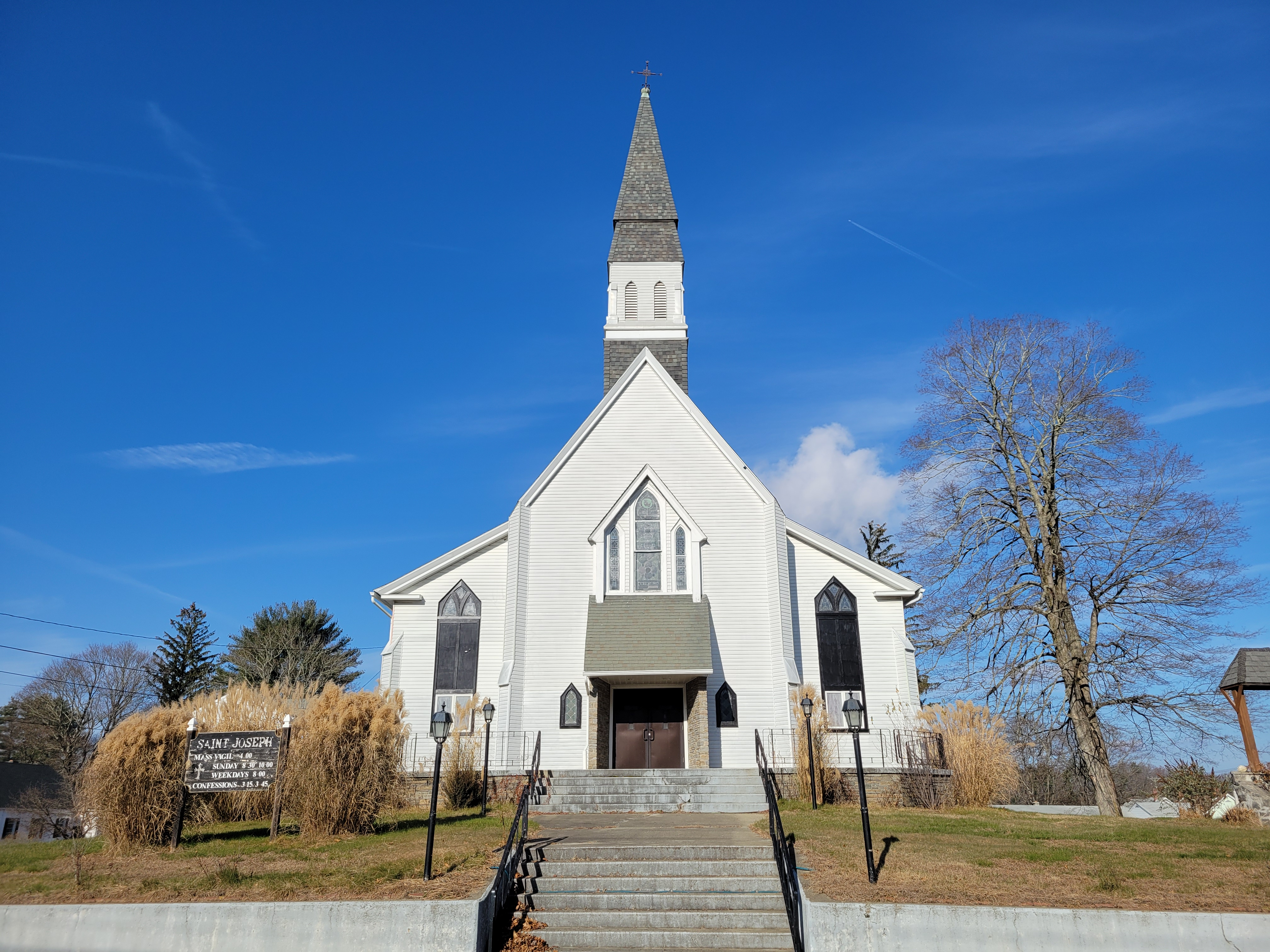
- St. Joseph's Church

- Location within Connecticut Location within the United States
- Coordinates: 41°50′45″N 71°53′16″W
- Country: United States
- State: Connecticut
- County: Windham
- Town: Killingly

Area
  - Total: 0.93 sq mi (2.41 km^{2})
  - Land: 0.93 sq mi (2.41 km^{2})
  - Water: 0 sq mi (0.0 km^{2})
- Elevation: 245 ft (75 m)
- Time zone: UTC−5 (Eastern (EST))
  - Summer (DST): UTC−4 (EDT)
- ZIP Code: 06241
- Area codes: 860/959
- FIPS code: 09-18990
- GNIS feature ID: 2805988

Dayville is a census-designated place (CDP) in the northeast part of the town of Killingly in Windham County, Connecticut, United States. It is located on the east side of the Fivemile River, 5 miles (8 km) north of Danielson. Interstate 395 passes through the east side of the CDP, leading south to Norwich and north to Auburn, Massachusetts.

Dayville was first listed as a CDP prior to the 2020 census.

The Dayville Historic District occupies 15 acres (6.1 ha) at the center of the village.
