= Broad Street – Davis Park Historic District =

Historic district in Connecticut, United States

- U.S. National Register of Historic Places
- U.S. Historic district
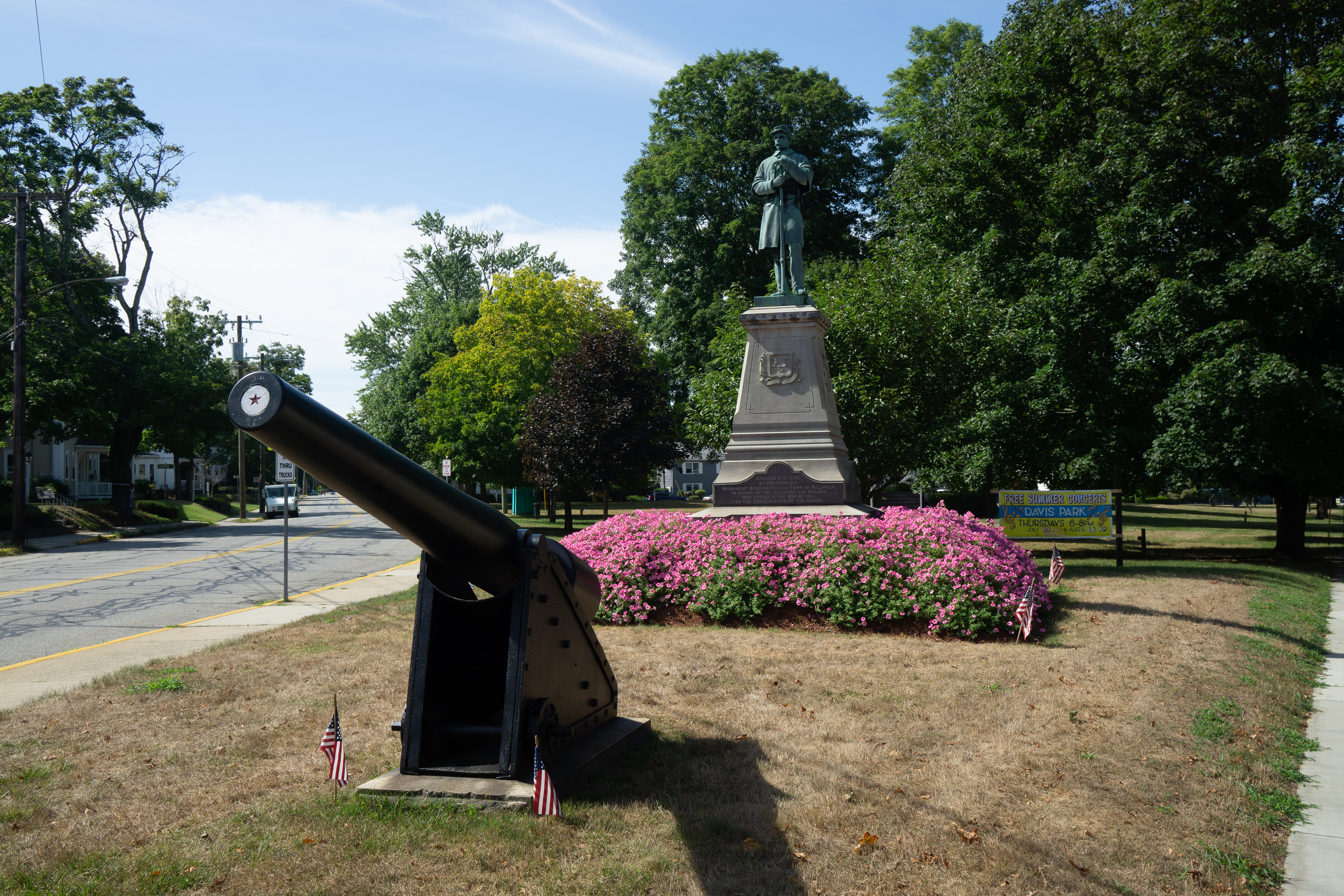
- Civil War Memorial in Davis Park

- Location within Connecticut Location within the United States
- Location: Roughly along Broad Street, from Dorrane Street to Winter Street, Killingly, Connecticut
- Coordinates: 41°48′27″N 71°52′50″W
- Area: 30 acres (12 ha)
- Architectural style: Stick/Eastlake, Queen Anne, Colonial Revival
- NRHP reference No.: 98001556
- Added to NRHP: December 31, 1998

Broad Street – Davis Park Historic District is a historic district in the borough of Danielson, in the town of Killingly, Connecticut. The district is mainly residential in character, and includes Davis Park, a 1.9-acre (0.77 ha) triangular park created in 1890 and bounded by Main, Reynolds, and Broad Streets. The district as a whole is 30 acres (12 ha) in size. It includes examples of Stick/Eastlake, Queen Anne, and Colonial Revival architectural styles and was added to the National Register of Historic Places in 1998. It includes 95 contributing buildings, one contributing site, and four contributing objects.

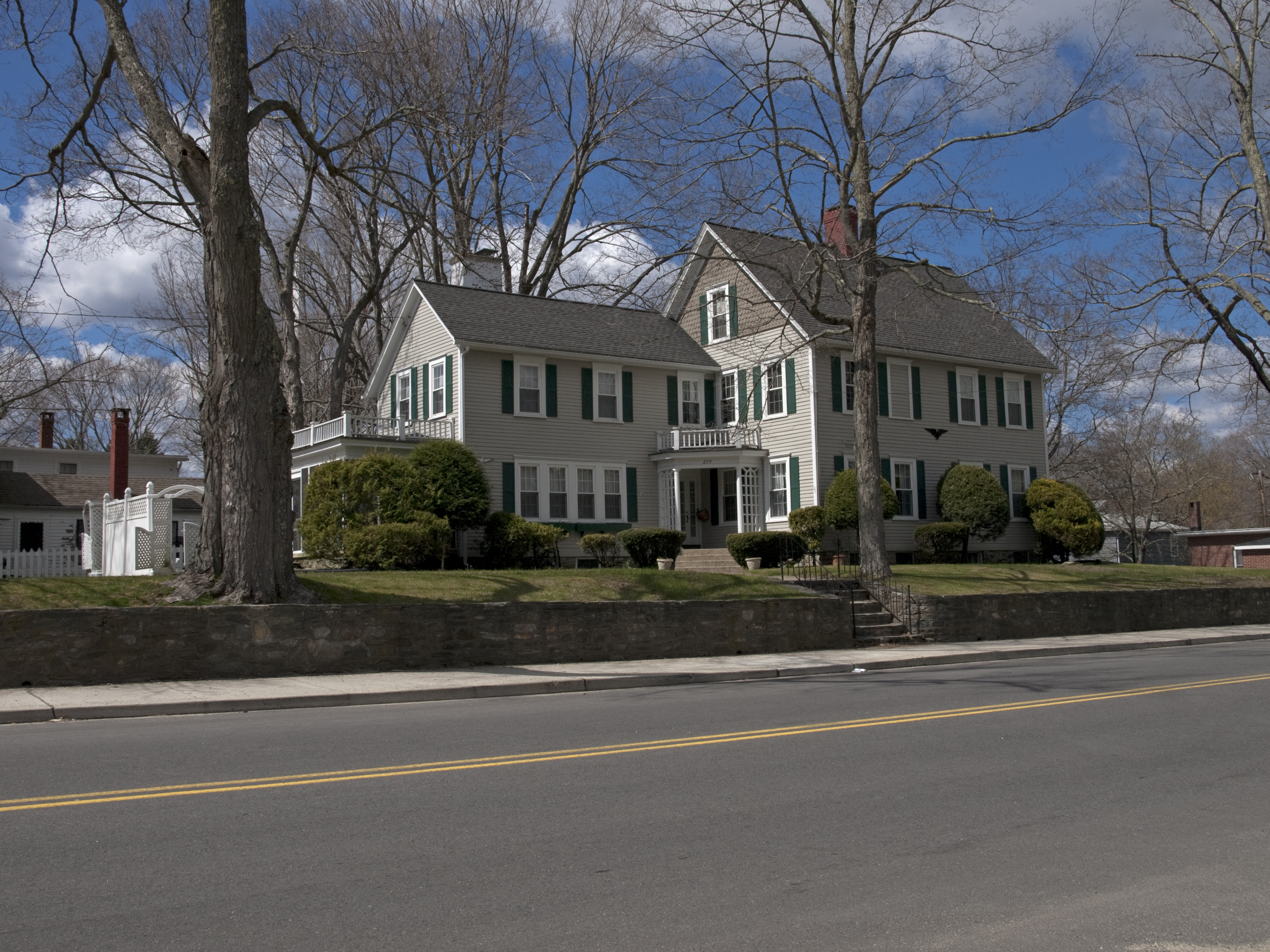
A house on Broad Street

The district is significant for its architecture, which includes many examples of Victorian architecture with rich detailing. The buildings in the district also reflect the institutions and people responsible with the development of Danielson. The town's growth began in 1809, when brothers James and Hezekiah Danielson built a cotton spinning mill. The house of Hezekiah, built about 1825, is the oldest building in the district. The village's growth was further fueled by other textile mills, the completion of the Norwich and Worcester Railroad through town in 1830, the establishment of other businesses, and the expansion of the textile mills from the 1850s onward. The houses in the Broad Street-Davis Park area were built by middle and upper-class residents, who chose the latest architectural styles and built large houses. The area also was above the river terrace, providing fine views and flood protection.

It includes the Old Killingly High School building, which is separately listed on the National Register, and two churches: the 1891 Gothic St. Alban's Church, and the 1960s Baptist Church, the latter of which is not historically significant.

== See also ==
- National Register of Historic Places listings in Windham County, Connecticut
