= Hartford–Brainard Airport =

- USGS 2006 orthophoto
- IATA: HFD; ICAO: KHFD; FAA LID: HFD

Summary
- Airport type: Public
- Owner: Connecticut Airport Authority
- Location: Hartford, Connecticut
- Elevation AMSL: 18 ft (5.5 m)
- Coordinates: 41°44′12″N 072°38′58″W
- Website: HFD website

Maps
- FAA airport diagram
- Interactive map of Hartford–Brainard Airport

Runways
Direction	Length		Surface
Direction	ft	m	Surface
2/20	4,417	1,346	Asphalt
11/29	2,314	705	Asphalt
NE/SW	2,309	704	Turf

Helipads
Number	Length		Surface
Number	ft	m	Surface
H1	70	21	Asphalt
H2	40	14	Asphalt

Statistics (2015)
- Aircraft operations: 61,470
- Based aircraft: 144
- Source: Federal Aviation Administration

Hartford–Brainard Airport (IATA: HFD, ICAO: KHFD, FAA LID: HFD) is a towered public airport three miles (5 km) southeast of downtown Hartford, in Hartford County, Connecticut, United States. It is owned by the Connecticut Airport Authority. The Federal Aviation Administration (FAA) National Plan of Integrated Airport Systems for 2017–2021 categorized it as a regional reliever airport facility.

The airport is named after former mayor Newton C. Brainard.

== History ==
Brainard Field was opened in 1921 in a former cow pasture in the southeast Hartford Neighborhood of South Meadows. In the early 20th century, Amelia Earhart and Charles Lindbergh landed there to great acclaim.

For its first decade, officials limited the airfield's use primarily to small passenger flights, but in 1933, city officials opened Brainard to commercial traffic. Passenger airlines, such as American Airlines, Eastern Airlines, and Colonial Airlines served Brainard. However, the airport could not handle the large Douglas DC-3 and heavier planes that became common by the 1930s. The weight of the planes was too much for grass runways; later, the city would install a blacktop runway. Additionally, Brainard could not accommodate large aircraft because its runways are too short; the airport's proximity to Connecticut River also resulted in fog problems.

As a result, larger aviation began to move to the new Bradley International Airport in Windsor Locks after it opened in 1947, and by 1958 all commercial carriers had relocated. With Brainard no longer the principal airport for the Greater Hartford area, the Hartford city council voted for its closure, though the next year in 1959 the state and the city entered into an agreement transferring control of the airport to the state. A large runway was closed to support development of the South Meadows commercial and industrial district off Brainard Road, reducing the airport's size to 201 acres (81.3 ha).

In 1986, Brainard had nearly 25,000 more takeoffs and landings than Bradley, with 90 per hour during peak periods.

As of 2016, Brainard served as the reliever airport for Bradley Airport, with approximately 360 people working at the various airport-related businesses and at government agencies based on-site.

=== Closure discussion ===
Closing Brainard was first proposed in 1950s and has remained a common political talking point in Hartford. In 1981, a proposal to close the airport was met with more opposition than support. In 1993, a proposal by then-governor of Connecticut Lowell Weicker to close Brainard and move operations to Rentschler Field in East Hartford was unsuccessful.

Following additional shelved proposals in 2006 and 2016, the Hartford City Council unanimously passed a non-binding resolution in August 2021 calling for Brainard to be decommissioned and redeveloped into a 201-acre housing, entertainment, retail, and commercial complex with a marina, similar to the 2016 proposal. A 30% decline in takeoffs and landings between 2010 and 2020, annual operating losses, and non-taxable property were cited by supporters of closure, while supporters of keeping the airport open pointed to a 2016 study that said the airport contributes more than 100 private-sector jobs to the region, serves as a public safety hub, and should be renovated and expanded. The Connecticut Airport Authority, which has final authority over the airport, says it has no plans to close.

== Facilities ==
Hartford–Brainard Airport covers 201 acres (81 ha) and has three runways and two helipads:

- 2/20: 4,417 x 150 ft (1,346 x 46 m), asphalt
- 11/29: 2,314 x 71 ft (705 x 22 m), asphalt
- NE/SW: 2,309 x 150 ft (704 x 46 m), turf (closed during winter months from November 2 to April 30 except for ski-equipped aircraft or helicopter training)
- Helipad H1: 70 x 77 ft (21 x 23 m), asphalt
- Helipad H2: 44 x 44 ft (13 x 13 m), asphalt

In the year ending June 12, 2001 the airport had 120,217 aircraft operations, average 329 per day: 99% general aviation, 1% air taxi and <1% military. Some 144 aircraft are based at this airport: 87% single-engine, 10% multi-engine, 1% jet aircraft, 1% helicopters and 1% gliders.

The Connecticut Wing Civil Air Patrol 071st Royal Charter Composite Squadron (NER-CT-071) operates out of the airport.

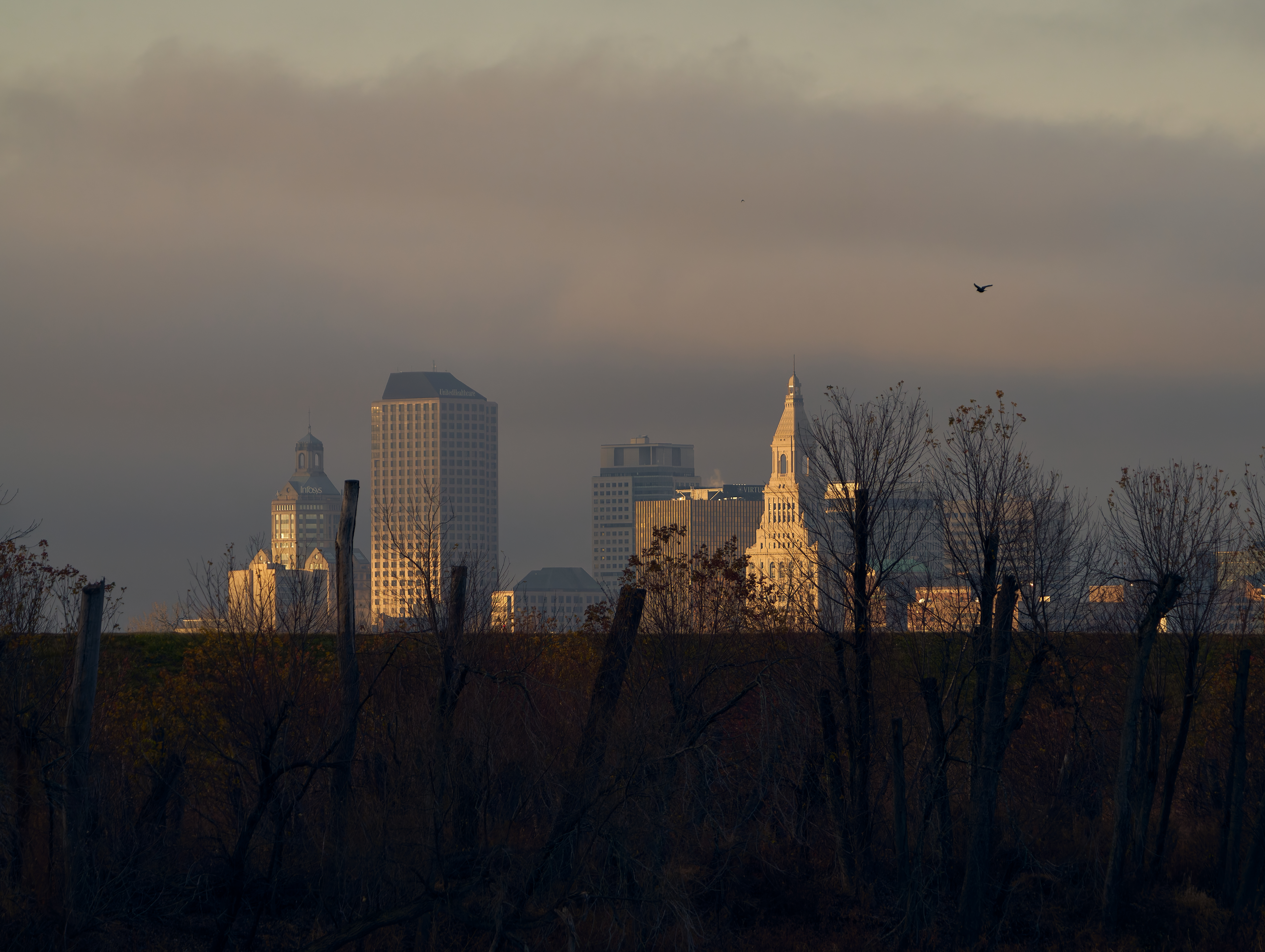
Hartford skyline observed through an avigation easement at Hartford-Brainard airport

== See also ==
- Bradley International Airport (BDL)
- Connecticut World War II Army Airfields
- List of airports in Connecticut
