= Danielson Main Street Historic District =

Historic district in Connecticut, United States

- U.S. National Register of Historic Places
- U.S. Historic district
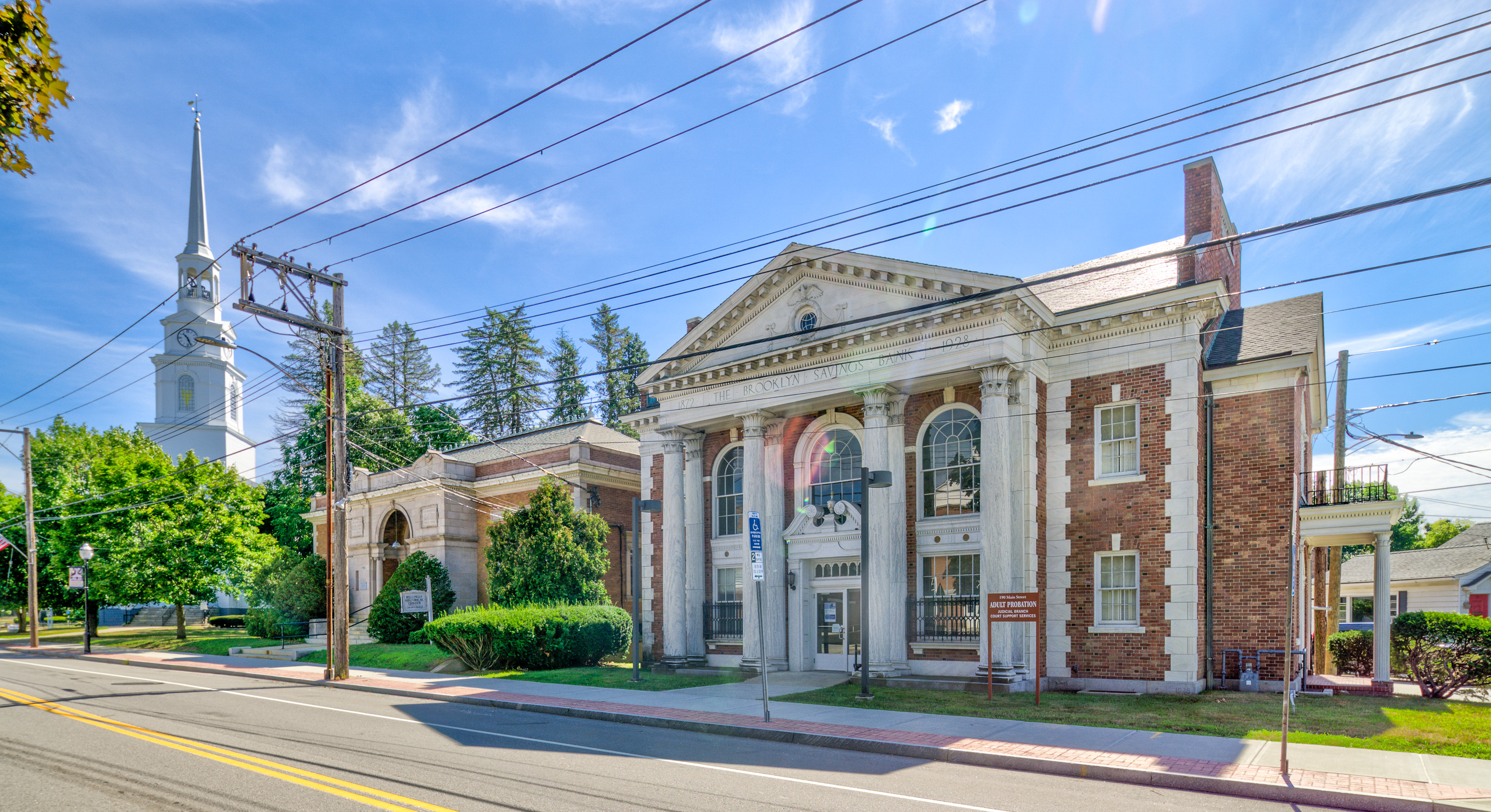
- Westfield Congregational Church, Bugbee Memorial Library, and Brooklyn Savings Bank

- Location within Connecticut Location within the United States
- Location: Main Street from Water Street to Spring Street, Killingly, Connecticut
- Coordinates: 41°48′18″N 71°53′4″W
- Area: 20 acres (8.1 ha)
- Architectural style: Colonial Revival, Italianate, Commercial Style
- NRHP reference No.: 92000265
- Added to NRHP: April 8, 1992

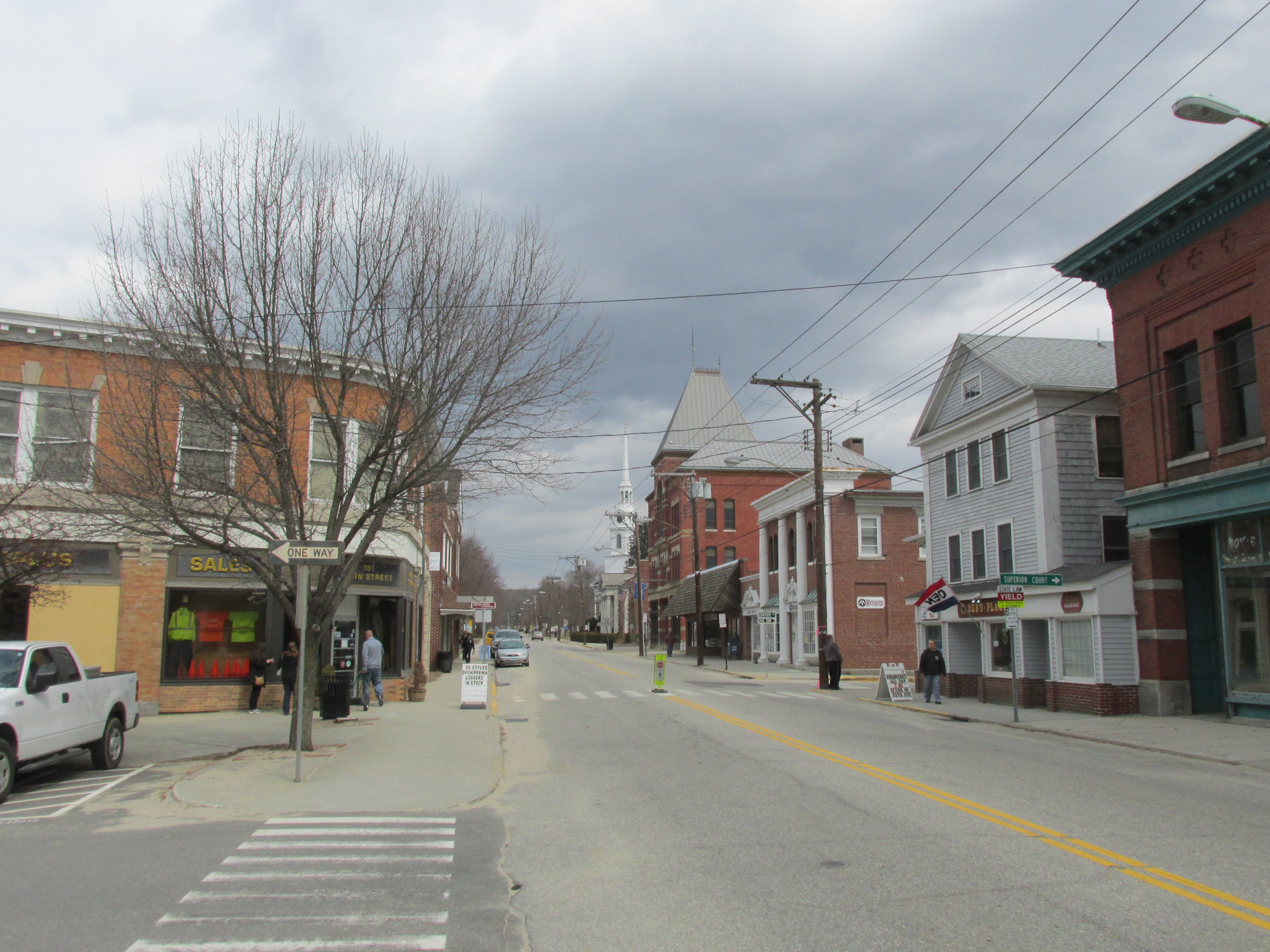
Main Street at Central Street

The Danielson Main Street Historic District encompasses the historic late 19th-century commercial business district of the borough of Danielson in the town of Killingly, Connecticut. It extends along Main Street, between the Five Mile River and Spring Street, including a few buildings on adjacent side streets, representing the area's growth as a commercial and civic center in the late 19th and early 20th centuries. It was listed on the National Register of Historic Places in 1992.

== Description and history ==
The borough of Danielson is located just north of the confluence of the Quinebaug and Five Mile Rivers. Its early 19th-century development took place because of mills located mainly across the Quinebaug in Brooklyn, whose proprietors built worker housing in the Danielson area. The Norwich and Worcester Railroad was routed through that village in the 1830s, and the Danielson Manufacturing Company was established in Danielson at the point above the river confluence. The railroad in particular was important for the development of the central business district, which took place along Main Street both north and south of Railroad Square. There are no longer any railroad-related buildings in that area, which is now dominated by parking lots.

The historic district is 20 acres (8.1 ha) in size, and includes more than 40 buildings. Most are commercial structures, one to three stories in height, and of masonry construction. Most were built between about 1850 and 1920, although some later additions, including the post office, are stylistically compatible examples of Colonial Revival architecture. Non-commercial buildings include the 1901 Classical Revival Bugbee Memorial Library, the 1855 Italianate Westfield Congregational Church, and the 1902 Gothic Revival Danielson Methodist Church. Killingly's town hall is located in the district, in an 1876 Gothic Revival music hall.

Significant properties in the district include:

- Cyr Building (1893)
- Evans Block (1878)
- Attawaugan Hotel (1856)
- Diamond Building (1932)
- Danielson Post Office (1935)
- Holy Trinity Greek Orthodox Church (1918)
- Southern New England Telephone Company Building (1942)
- Connecticut State Armory (1932)

== See also ==
- National Register of Historic Places listings in Windham County, Connecticut
