= Regional School District 3 =

School district in Connecticut, United States

Location
- Connecticut; United States

District information
- Type: Public

Regional School District 3 contains Old Killingly High School, Pomfret Community School, Putnam School District and Thompson Schools. Regional School District 3 was designed for the Agriculture Wing at Old Killingly High School so they could make it easier to get all the people together.
