= Danielson Airport =

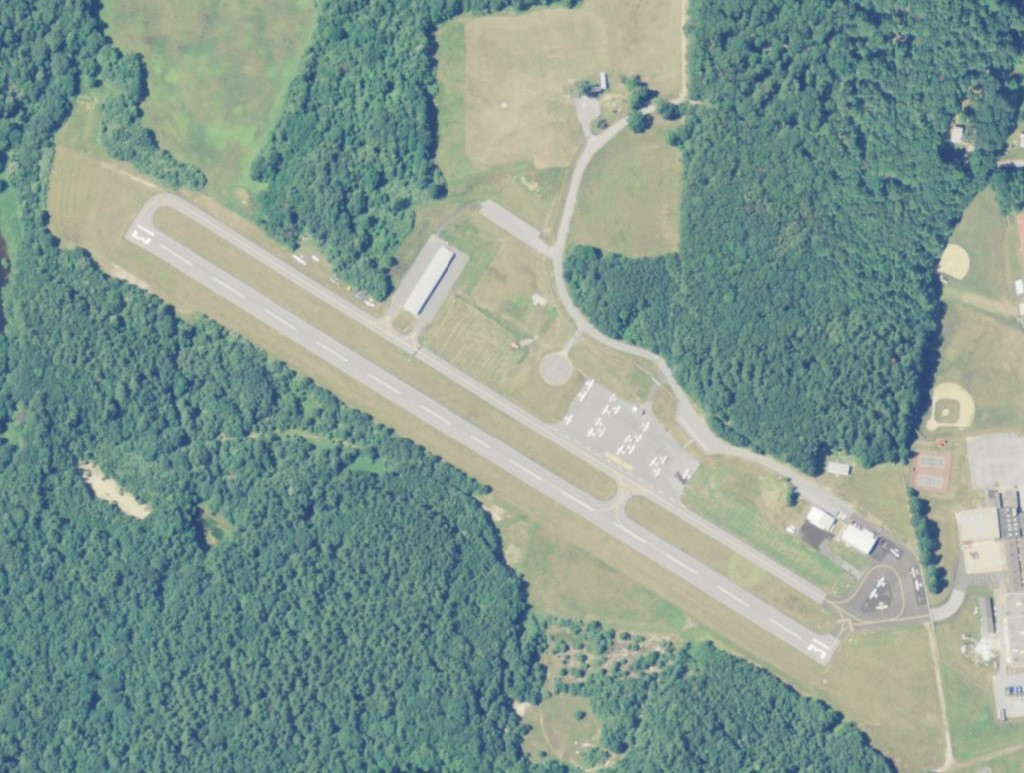
- USGS 2006 orthophoto
- IATA: none; ICAO: KLZD; FAA LID: LZD

Summary
- Airport type: Public
- Owner: Connecticut Airport Authority
- Serves: Danielson, Connecticut
- Elevation AMSL: 238 ft (73 m)
- Coordinates: 41°49′11″N 071°54′04″W
- Website: LZD website

Maps
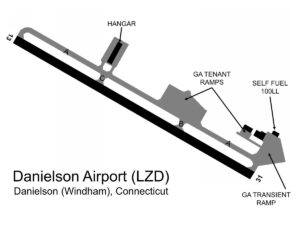
- Interactive map of Danielson Airport

Runways
Direction	Length		Surface
Direction	ft	m	Surface
13/31	2,700	823	Asphalt

Statistics (2011)
- Aircraft operations: 22,102
- Based aircraft: 37
- Source: Federal Aviation Administration

Danielson Airport (ICAO: KLZD, FAA LID: LZD, formerly 5B3) is a state-owned public-use airport located two nautical miles (4 km) northwest of the central business district of Danielson, a borough in the town of Killingly in Windham County, Connecticut, United States. The airport was initially opened as a small air strip to accommodate aircraft arriving for service at the Harvard H. Ellis Regional Vocational Technical School, with its first paved runway completed in 1962. It is the smallest airport in the state to be included in the Federal Aviation Administration (FAA) National Plan of Integrated Airport Systems for 2017–2021, in which it is categorized as a local general aviation facility.

Although most U.S. airports use the same three-letter location identifier for the FAA and IATA, this airport is assigned LZD by the FAA but has no assignment from the IATA.

== Facilities and aircraft ==
Danielson Airport covers an area of 257 acres (104 ha) at an elevation of 238 feet (73 m) above mean sea level. It has one runway designated 13/31 with an asphalt surface measuring 2,700 by 75 feet (823 x 23 m).

For the 12-month period ending October 31, 2011, the airport had 22,102 aircraft operations, an average of 60 per day: 99% general aviation, <1% air taxi, and <1% military. At that time there were 37 aircraft based at this airport: 89% single-engine, 8% glider, and 3% multi-engine.

The Connecticut Wing Civil Air Patrol 074th Cadet Squadron (NER-CT-074) operates out of the airport.

== See also ==
- List of airports in Connecticut
