= Connecticut Airport Authority =

Airport authority

Agency overview
- Formed: 2011
- Agency executives: Thomas A. Sheridan, Chair; Michael T. Long, Vice Chair
- Website: ctairports.org

Connecticut Airport Authority is a quasi-public agency established in 2011 to develop, improve, and operate Bradley International Airport and the five state-owned general aviation airports (Danielson Airport, Groton–New London Airport, Hartford–Brainard Airport, Waterbury–Oxford Airport, and Windham Airport).
