= Quaddick State Park =

State park in Windham County, Connecticut

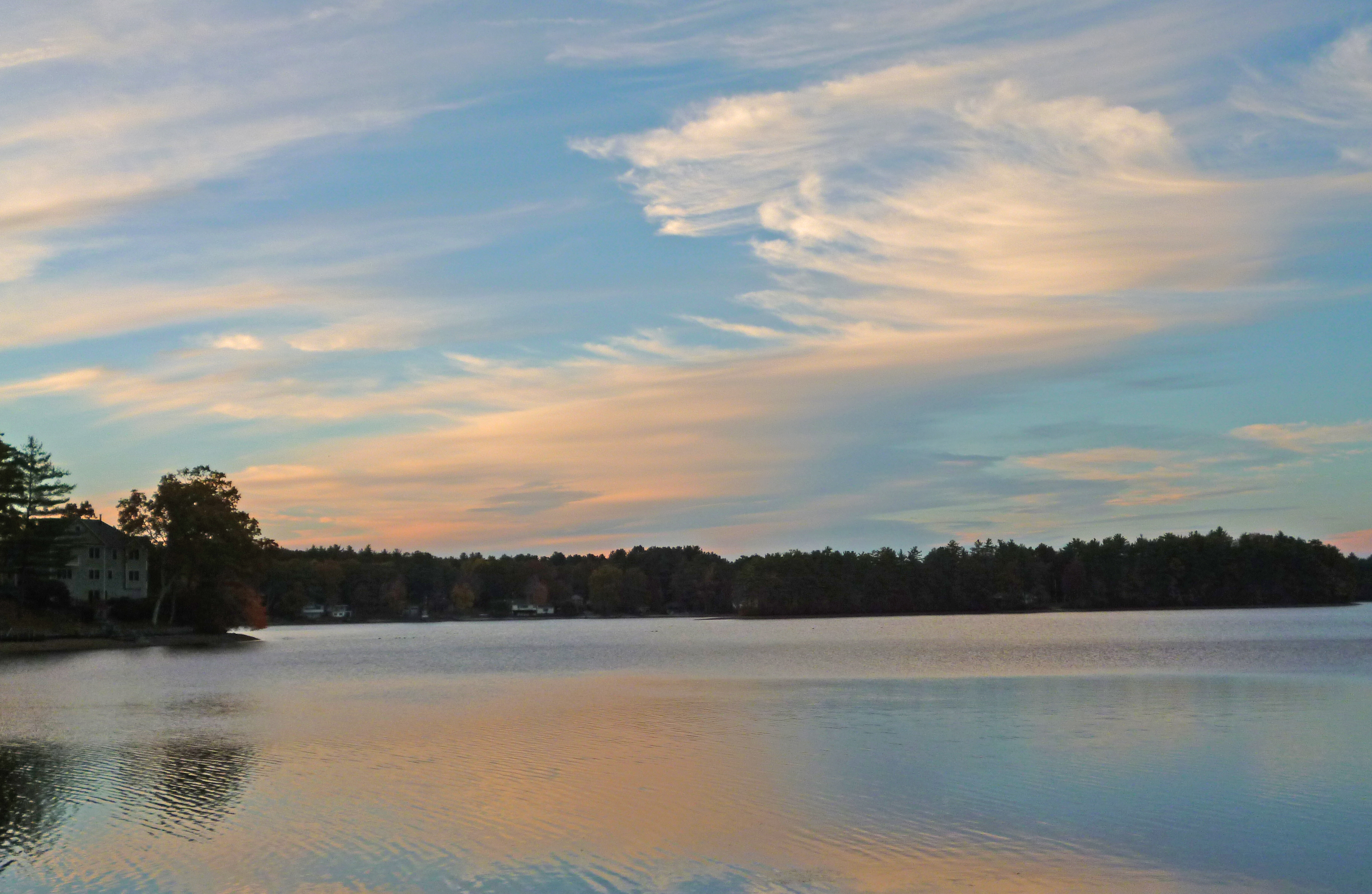
- Quaddick Reservoir, Quaddick State Park, October 2012

- Location within Connecticut Location within the United States
- Location: Thompson, Connecticut, United States
- Coordinates: 41°57′20″N 71°48′42″W
- Area: 116 acres (47 ha)
- Elevation: 443 ft (135 m)
- Designation: Connecticut state park
- Established: 1951
- Administrator: Connecticut Department of Energy and Environmental Protection
- Website: Quaddick State Park

Quaddick State Park is a public recreation area located on 203-acre (82 ha) Middle Quaddick Reservoir in the town of Thompson, Connecticut. The state park is managed by the Connecticut Department of Energy and Environmental Protection and offers opportunities for boating, swimming, fishing, and picnicking.

== History ==
The park was originally developed as a forest recreation area as part of 614-acre (248 ha) Quaddick State Forest. It was split off as a state park in 1951. It appeared for the first time in the 1952 Connecticut Register and Manual as a developed state park of 118 acres (48 ha), with Quaddick State Forest reduced to 496 acres (201 ha). Prior to its use for public recreation, the park, which is located on Town Farm Road and crossed by Poor Farm Brook, had been the site of Thompson's town farm, where indigent and elderly residents were taken care of by the local government.

== Activities and amenities ==
In addition to a swimming beach and picnicking facilities, the park offers a boat ramp and a one-and-half-mile circular trail for hikers.
