= Quaddick Reservoir =

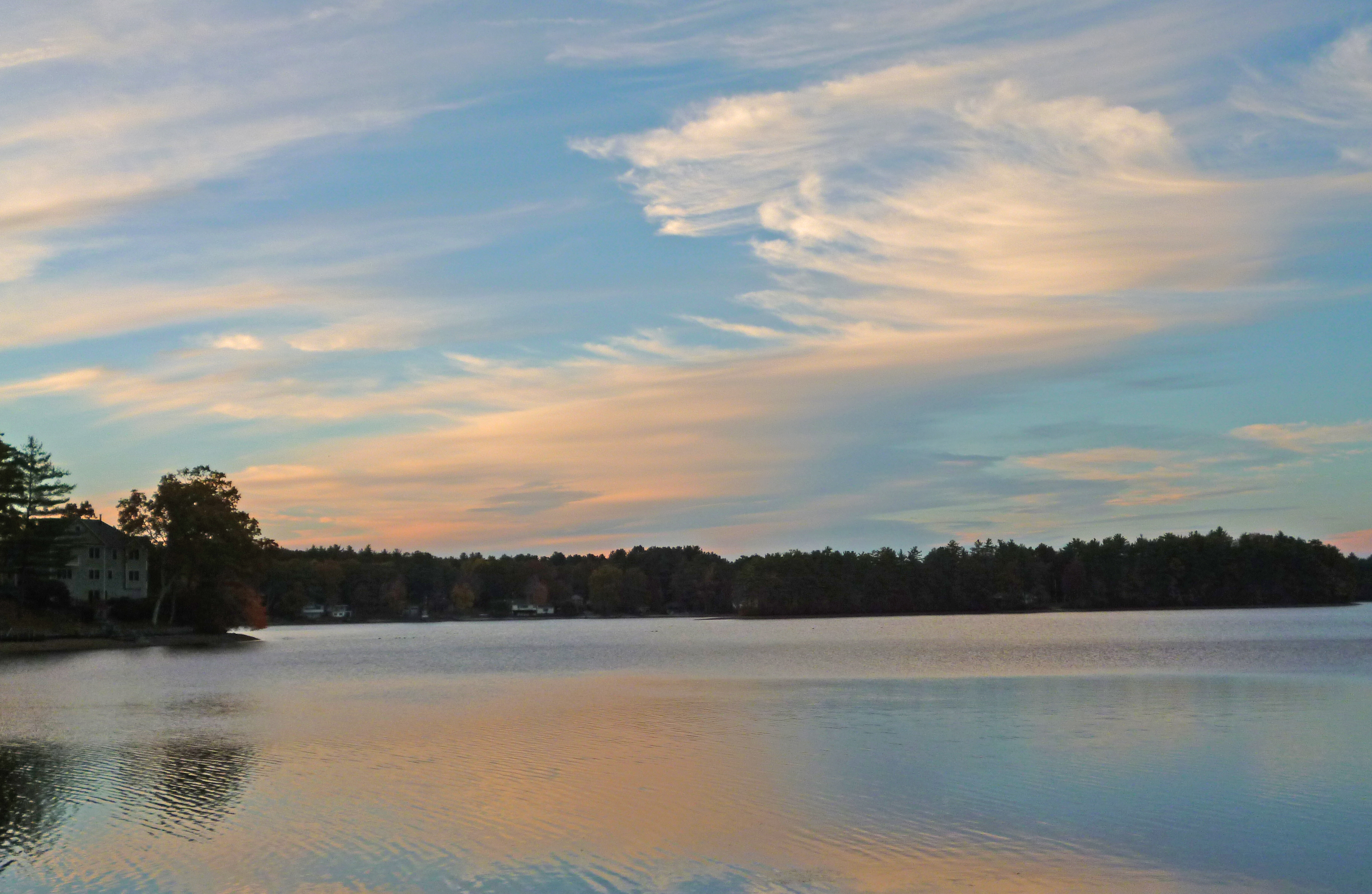
- Quaddick Reservoir from Quaddick State Park

- Location in Connecticut
- Location: Thompson, Connecticut, United States
- Coordinates: 41°56′48″N 71°49′31″W
- Type: Reservoir
- Primary inflows: Five Mile River, Robbins Brook, Poor Farm Brook, Blackmore Brook
- Primary outflows: Five Mile River
- Catchment area: 35 square miles (91 km^{2})
- Basin countries: United States
- Max. length: 2.95 miles (4.75 km)
- Max. width: 2,370 feet (720 m)
- Surface area: 404 acres (163 ha)
- Max. depth: 18 feet (5.5 m)
- Surface elevation: 403 feet (123 m) (85 m)
- Islands: Green, Gould’s, Brandy Hill, Harris
- Sections/sub-basins: Lower, Middle and Upper

Quaddick Reservoir is a man-made body of water in the town of Thompson, Connecticut. The reservoir has three sections: Lower (124 acres), Middle (203 acres), and Upper (81 acres). It originated with the completion of a dam on the Five Mile River in 1865. Quaddick State Park sits on the eastern shore of the Middle Reservoir.
