= Temple Beth Israel (Danielson, Connecticut) =

Historic former synagogue in Connecticut, US

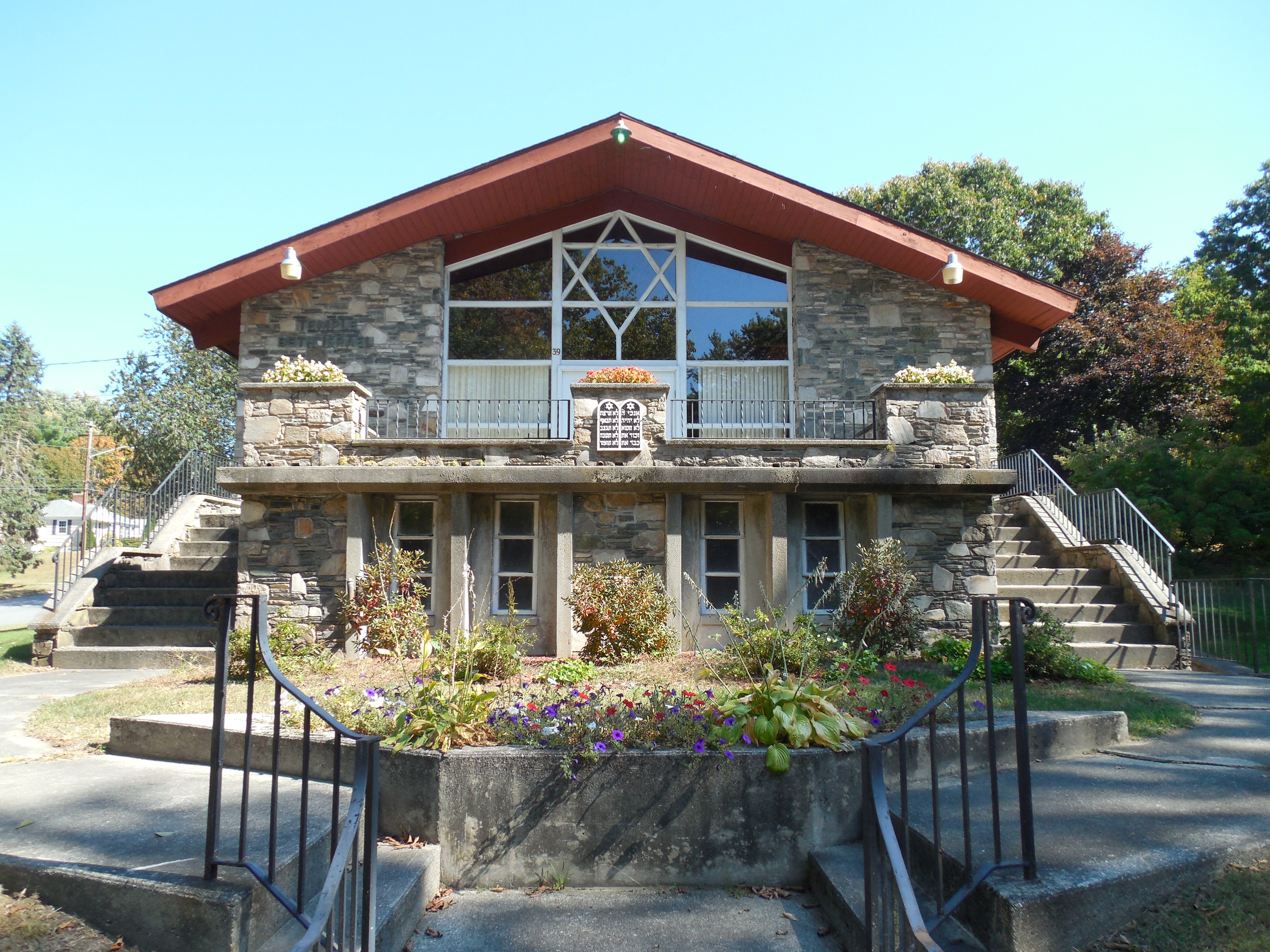
- The synagogue in 2014

- Location of the former synagogue in Connecticut

Religion
- Affiliation: Orthodox Judaism (former); and Conservative (former)
- Ecclesiastical or organizational status: Synagogue (1961–2008); (since 2009)
- Ownership: Temple Beth Israel Preservation Society
- Status: Closed (as a synagogue);

Location
- Location: 39 Killingly Drive, Danielson, Connecticut 06239
- Country: United States
- Interactive map of Temple Beth Israel
- Coordinates: 41°48′14″N 71°52′40″W

Architecture
- Architects: William Riseman (original); Maurice Finegold (alterations)
- Type: Synagogue
- Style: Modernist
- Established: unknown (as a congregation)
- Completed: 1961

Website
- tbipreservation.org
- Temple Beth Israel
- U.S. National Register of Historic Places
- Area: less than one acre
- NRHP reference No.: 13000162
- Added to NRHP: April 16, 2013

Temple Beth Israel is an historic former Orthodox and Conservative Jewish synagogue building, located at 39 Killingly Drive in the Danielson village of Killingly, Connecticut, in the United States.

Built between 1951 and 1961 to a design by Boston, Massachusetts architect William Riseman, it is one of the first Modernist synagogues built in Connecticut. It was built in part by members of its congregation, many of whom were survivors of The Holocaust, and was formally dedicated on June 5, 1961 after ten years of construction. The congregation was a mix of Orthodox and Conservative adherents, and was merged with a congregation in Putnam in 2003.

The building was listed on the National Register of Historic Places in 2013, and it has served as a cultural historical center, managed by a non-profit organization since 2009.

== Architecture and history ==
Temple Beth Israel is located in a residential area to the east of the Danielson's commercial district, at the southwest corner of Killingly Drive and Corinne Street. It is a two-story structure, built mainly out of concrete faced with fieldstone, and covered by a broad gabled roof that has extended eaves with exposed rafters. Bands of windows line three sides of the building's upper story. The basement houses a vestry, meeting area, and physical plant, while the upper level houses the sanctuary.

At the end of World War II, Danielson was home to a small number of Jewish families, who organized religious activities in their homes. The town saw a significant influx of Holocaust survivors after the war, settled with funding from the Jewish Agriculture Association, a charity established by Baron Maurice de Hirsch, a prominent Jewish philanthropist. The extant Jews and new arrivals banded together to establish a temple. Stone for the building was donated by Mary Riseman of nearby Brooklyn, and her son William, primarily an interior decorator working out of Boston, Massachusetts, donated his services to design the building. Construction began in 1951, and early services were held in the basement while funds were raised to complete the building. Its formal dedication took place in 1961. The building is distinctive in Connecticut as the first known instance of Modern movement architecture in a synagogue.

The congregation, a blend of Orthodox and Conservative adherents, was generally served by itinerant rabbis, often religious students. Over the subsequent decades, it declined in size as its members aged and either died or moved away. In 2003, it merged with the Sons of Zion congregation in Putnam, adopting the new name B'nai Shalom. That congregation decided in 2008 to discontinue use of this building. A secular preservation society was organized to keep it, which has transformed it into a cultural and historical center, dedicated to preserving the history of the Jewish experience in the area.

== See also ==
- National Register of Historic Places listings in Windham County, Connecticut
