= Quaddick State Forest =

State forest in Connecticut, US

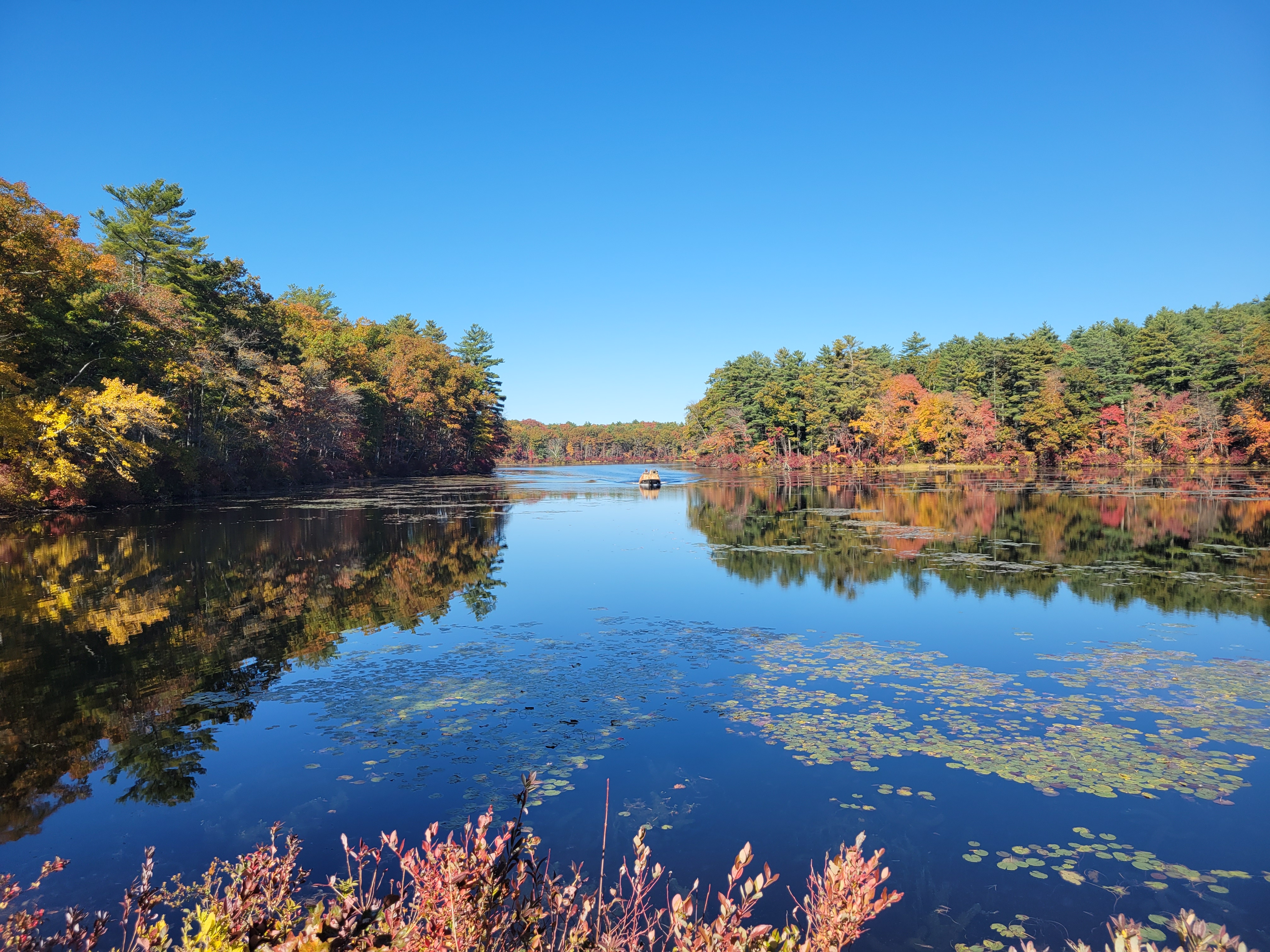
- Quaddick Reservoir

- Location within Connecticut Location within the United States
- Location: Thompson, Connecticut, United States
- Coordinates: 41°58′20″N 71°48′36″W
- Area: 550 acres (220 ha)
- Elevation: 476 ft (145 m)
- Established: 1930s
- Administrator: Connecticut Department of Energy and Environmental Protection
- Website: Quaddick State Forest

Quaddick State Forest is a Connecticut state forest located in the town of Thompson north of Quaddick State Park. The forest protects 466-acre (189 ha) Quaddick Reservoir and provides opportunities for fishing, hunting, canoeing, letterboxing, and youth group camping.
