= Ida Bailey Allen =

American chef and author

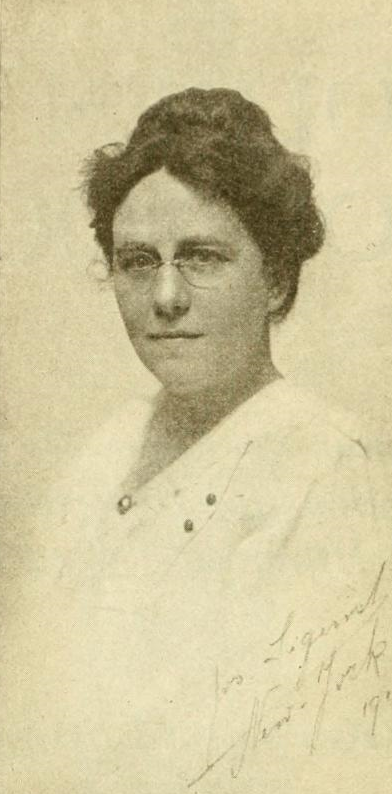
- Born: January 30, 1885; Danielson, Connecticut, U.S.
- Died: July 16, 1973 (aged 88); Norwalk, Connecticut, U.S.
- Other name: The Nation's Homemaker
- Occupations: Chef; Journalist; Radio personality Author
- Culinary career
- Cooking style: Cuisine of the United States

Ida Cogswell Bailey Allen (January 30, 1885 – July 16, 1973) was an American chef and author who was once popularly known as "The Nation's Homemaker," writing more than 50 cookbooks. She was described as "The original domestic goddess" by antique cookbook experts Patricia Edwards and Peter Peckham.

== Early years ==
Allen was born in 1885 in Danielson, Connecticut.

== Career ==
In 1924 Allen was food editor of the Sunday New York American. By 1928 she was hosting a regular daytime radio show which expanded to two hours the following year. She not only performed on the show, she also produced and sold her own advertising; she was a pioneer in selling spot advertising rather than having a single company sponsor a show. The program ended in 1932, at which time she began a syndicated cooking show on the Columbia Broadcasting System (now known as CBS). She became television's first female food host on Mrs. Allen and the Chef.

She was an editor of Good Housekeeping, writing the "Three Meals a Day" column, as well as Home Economics Editor of Pictorial Review and Woman's World. She was president and founder of the National Radio Home-Makers Club. During World War II, Allen was drafted by the US Food Administrator as lecturer.

She once lived atop 400 Madison Avenue, New York City where visitors were able to see the "latest developments in homemaking", and could watch her staff develop and test new recipes for cooking. A 1932 promotional book she wrote for Coca-Cola, When You Entertain, was so popular 375,000 copies were sold in under six months.

== Death ==
Allen died July 16, 1973, in Norwalk, Connecticut.

== Published works ==
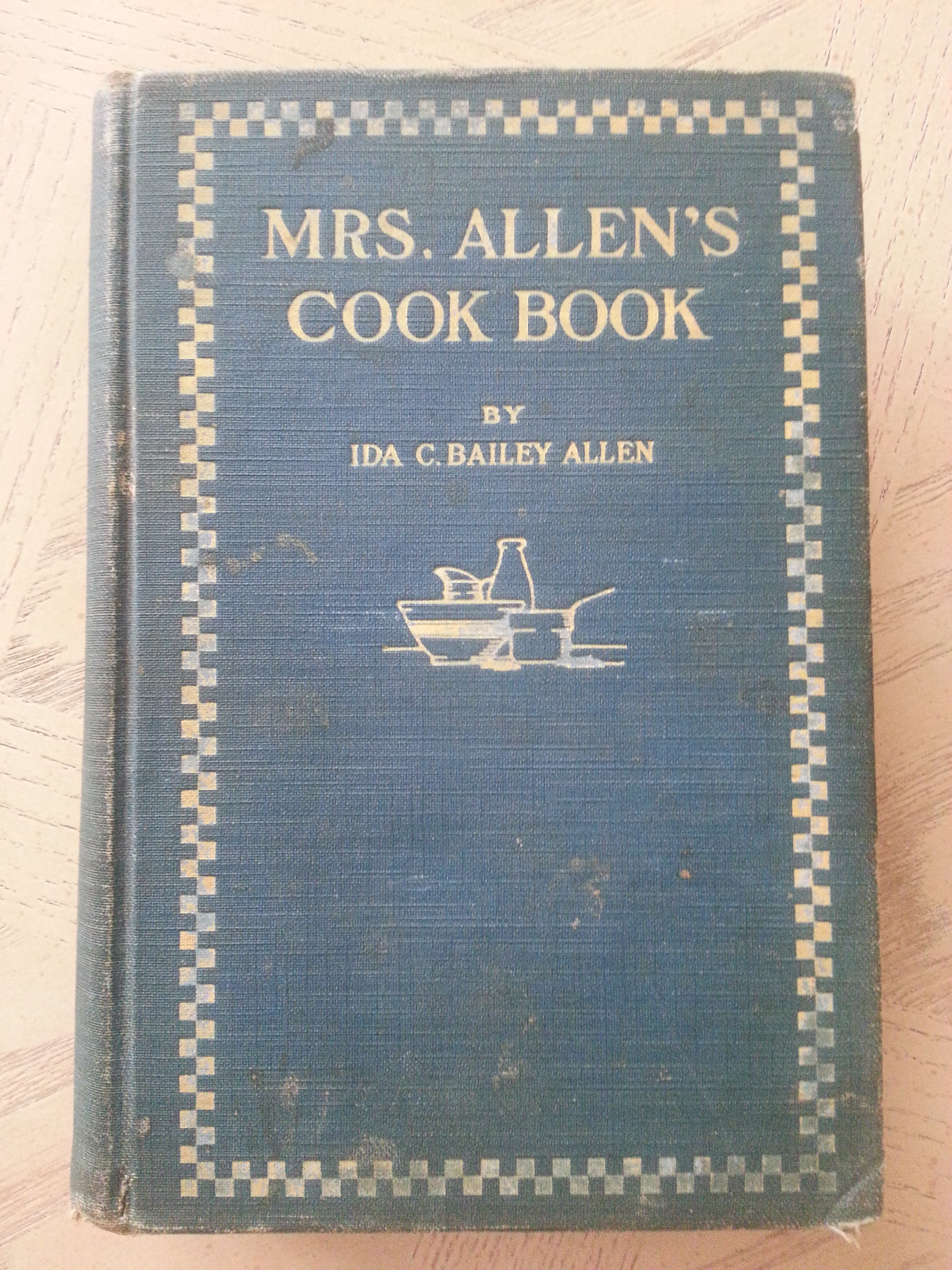
Mrs. Allen's Cookbook, 1917, one of the many cookbooks authored by Allen

This is a partial list of Allen's published works.

- Mrs. Allen's Cookbook. Small, Maynard and Company. 1917.
- For The Bride - Helpful Hints Practical Suggestions and Valuable Records. Reuben Donnelley Corp., Chicago 1922 & 1923.
- Home Partners, or, Seeing the Family Through, Privately Printed, 1924
- Cooking Menu Service. Garden City Publishing. 1924. ASIN B0047CXEDW.
- 104 Prize Radio Recipes. J. H. Sears and Co., Inc. 1926. ASIN B002DF82EQ.
- The Modern Method of Preparing Delightful Foods. Corn Products Refining Company. 1928.
- Your Foods and You, PF Collier & Son, 1929
- Service Cook Book #1. 1933. ASIN B000OHDGBE.
- Ida Bailey Allen's Modern Cook Book: 2500 Delicious Recipes. Garden City Publishing Co. 1932. ASIN B0021YZ4AE.
- When You Entertain – What To Do and How. Coca-Cola. 1932. ASIN B000I93FBE.
- Ida Bailey Allen's Wines and Spirits Cook Book. Simon and Schuster, New York. 1934.
- The Service Cook Book No. 2. Educational Publishing Corp. for F. W. Woolworth Co. 1935.
- Money-Saving Cook Book; Eating for Victory. Nelson Doubleday. 1942. ASIN B0041H39LU.
- Pressure Cooking. Garden City Books. 1949. ASIN B001TAEFU6.
- Ida Bailey Allen's Step By Step Picture Cook Book. Grosset and Dunlap. 1952. ASIN B000NP2ORY.
- Gastronomique: A Cookbook for Gourmets, 1962
- Best Loved Recipes of the American People, 1973
