= Newton C. Brainard =

American banker and historian

Newton Case Brainard (December 26, 1880 – July 16, 1964) was an American banker and historian who served as Mayor of Hartford, Connecticut from 1920 to 1922. He graduated from Yale University in 1902.

He was a member of the Acorn Club for bibliophiles, elected in 1915; he was also a member of the Connecticut Historical Society, of which he was president from 1953 to 1963.

The Hartford–Brainard Airport, in Connecticut, is named after him.
