= National Radio Home-Makers Club =

The National Radio Home-Makers Club is a CBS Radio show of the 1920s, created and produced by Ida Bailey Allen. Allen, a dietician and cookbook author, dispensed nutrition information as well as advice on menus and beauty. Broadcast on WJAS, the program was unusual for its time; while most radio programs of the era were sponsored by one company, The National Radio Home-Makers Club was made possible by spot advertisements that made Allen, a pioneer in such advertising, a forward-thinking businesswoman.
