= Theodore J. Cusson =

American politician (1936–2023)

Member of the New Hampshire House of Representatives from the Hillsborough 35th district
- In office 1986–1988

Personal details
- Born: Theodore Jude Cusson; October 21, 1936 Danielson, Connecticut, U.S.
- Died: November 26, 2023 (aged 87) Manchester, New Hampshire, U.S.
- Party: Republican; Democratic

Theodore Jude Cusson (October 21, 1936 – November 26, 2023) was an American politician. A member of the Republican Party and the Democratic Party, he served in the New Hampshire House of Representatives from 1986 to 1988.

== Life and career ==
Cusson was born in Danielson, Connecticut, the son of Joseph Cusson and Ida Beaudoin. He attended and graduated from Adjutant General's School. After graduating, he served with the 101st Airborne Division in the United States Army, which after his discharge, he worked as a licensed pilot.

Cusson served in the New Hampshire House of Representatives from 1986 to 1988.

== Death ==
Cusson died on November 26, 2023, at his home in Manchester, New Hampshire, at the age of 87.
