= Harriet Pritchard Arnold =

American author (1858–1901)

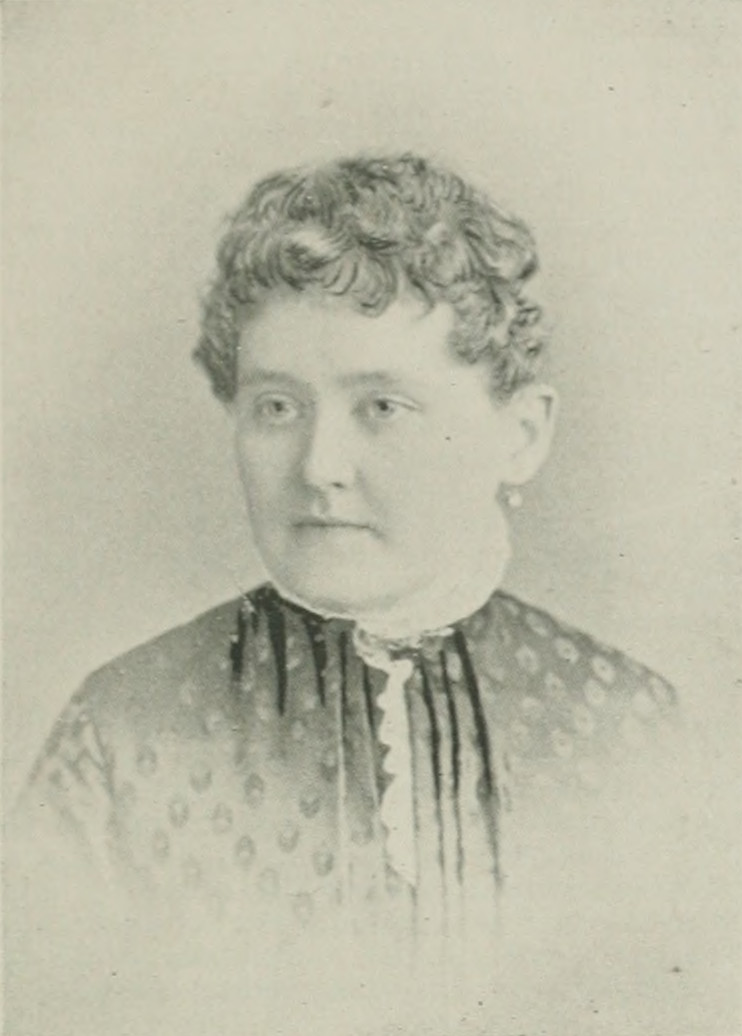
- Photo in A Woman of the Century
- Born: Harriet Eudora Pritchard; December 24, 1858; Killingly, Connecticut, U.S.
- Died: August 4, 1901 (aged 42); Providence, Rhode Island, U.S.
- Resting place: Swan Point Cemetery, Providence, Rhode Island
- Occupation: Author
- Spouse: Ernest Warner Arnold (m. 1886)
- Writing career
- Pen name: H. E. P.

Harriet Pritchard Arnold (née Pritchard; pen name: H.E.P.; December 24, 1858 - August 4, 1901) was a 19th-century American writer. Born in Connecticut, in 1858, she removed with her parents to Maine at a young age, with the greater portion of her life spent in Portland and vicinity. Her poems and short sketches appeared frequently in New England publications.

== Biography ==
Harriet Eudora Pritchard, an only child, was born in Killingly, Connecticut, December 24, 1858. Her father was the Rev. Benjamin F. Pritchard, a New England clergyman of Scotch and English descent, and her mother was Celia (Handel) Pritchard. In her childhood, Arnold evinced no particular fondness for books, preferring outdoor recreations. While wandering among the wooded vales and hills near her home in a suburb of Portland, Maine, where the greater part of her life was passed, she perhaps unconsciously developed the latent poetry in her nature.

In 1882, while recuperating from a lingering illness, she began writing. Thereafter, her poems and sketches appeared in various magazines and periodicals under the signature "H. E. P.", and her maiden name, "Harriet E. Pritchard".

In the year 1886, she married Ernest Warner Arnold, of Providence, Rhode Island, and made that city her home. She two children: Ralph and Celia.

Harriet Pritchard Arnold died August 4, 1901, aged 42, and was buried at Swan Point Cemetery in Providence.
