= Rentschler Field =

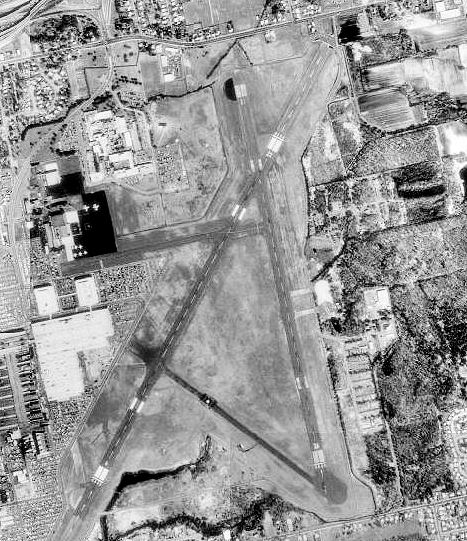
- Rentschler Field (Airport) on 23 April 1990, before its closure and dismantling. The current-day heliport is at the southwest corner of the airfield, the Rentschler Field stadium is at the northeast corner.
- IATA: ~~EHT~~; ICAO: none; FAA LID: CT88

Summary
- Airport type: Military
- Owner: original: United States Army later: United Technologies
- Location: East Hartford, Connecticut
- Elevation AMSL: 48 ft / 15 m
- Coordinates: 41°45′12″N 072°37′42″W

Map
- Interactive map of Rentschler Field
- Source: Federal Aviation Administration

Rentschler Field (IATA: ~~EHT~~, FAA LID: CT88) was an airport in East Hartford, Connecticut in use from 1933 to 1999. Originally a military facility, later a private corporate airport, it was decommissioned in 1999, after which the football stadium of the same name was built on the site. On November 22, 2021 it was announced that the undeveloped remainder of Rentschler Field, was acquired from Raytheon Technologies (formerly United Technologies, Pratt and Whitney) by Massachusetts development firm National Development. The property will offer businesses more than 280 acres for development. Terms of the deal were not disclosed. From 1930 to 1939, the Chance Vought Aircraft Corporations's manufacturing facility was located here, as was the Pratt & Whitney Aircraft Company and the Hamilton Standard Propellers Corporation.

== History ==
During World War II the airfield was used by the United States Army Air Forces First Air Force as a fighter base, providing coastal air defense over the Atlantic Ocean. After the war, the airfield was returned to civilian use and later, in the 1980s, was decommissioned.

In the mid-1990s, the Six Flags corporation considered using the vacated acreage as the site for a new amusement park property, following community pushback in the southeastern Connecticut tourist area surrounding their plan to use property in Stonington, Connecticut under an agreement with the Mashantucket Pequot Tribal Nation. City of East Hartford leadership supported the introduction of a Six Flags park to Rentschler Field, with key points including the site's large size, proximity to Hartford and central location near major thoroughfares Interstate 91 and Interstate 84, with the possibility to attract people from New York City and Boston, Massachusetts in addition to Southern New England. At the time, Six Flags was also considering alternate locations in Connecticut and Rhode Island. Then-governor John G. Rowland stated that he would support and enjoy a new Six Flags amusement park in East Hartford, but that the State of Connecticut would not provide additional funds to establish the project. In 1998, Six Flags parent company Time Warner Entertainment opted to sell the division to competitor Premier Parks, the owners of nearby Riverside Park (now known as Six Flags New England) in Agawam, Massachusetts. The deal extinguished the desire to construct an additional park in Connecticut.

Rentschler Field was donated to the State of Connecticut by United Technologies in 1999. Re-developed as part of the State of Connecticut's "UConn 2000" initiative, part of the former airfield became the University of Connecticut's new football stadium, Pratt and Whitney Stadium with the football field remaining the honorary name Rentschler Field. Students and fans of the UConn team commonly refer to the new stadium as "The Rent", an homage to the original name.

== See also ==
- Rentschler Heliport
- Connecticut World War II Army Airfields
