= Rentschler Heliport =

Heliport in East Hartford, Connecticut

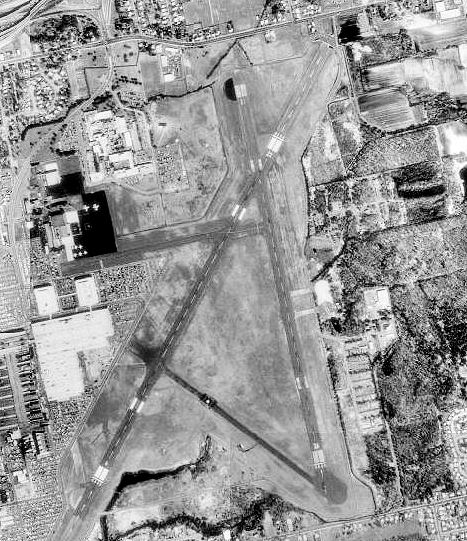
- Rentschler Field (Airport) on 23 April 1990, before its closure and dismantling. The current-day heliport is at the southwest corner of the airfield, the Rentschler Field football stadium is at the northeast corner.
- IATA: none; ICAO: none; FAA LID: CT88

Summary
- Airport type: Private
- Owner: Raytheon Technologies Corp.
- Location: East Hartford, Connecticut
- Elevation AMSL: 48 ft / 15 m
- Coordinates: 41°45′12″N 072°37′42″W

Map
- Interactive map of Rentschler Heliport

Helipads
Number	Length		Surface
Number	ft	m	Surface
H1	93	28	Asphalt/concrete
- Source: Federal Aviation Administration

Rentschler Heliport (FAA LID: CT88) is a private heliport for the exclusive use of Raytheon Technologies, located 2 miles southeast of East Hartford, Connecticut.

From 1933 to about 1997, Rentschler Field was an airfield used by the United States Army Air Forces during World War II as a fighter base.

== History ==
This former airfield was located only a few miles northeast of still-operational Hartford Brainard Airport. It was the former factory airfield for the Pratt & Whitney aircraft engine company.

The airfield, which began operations in 1931, was named after Frederick Brant Rentschler, who founded the aircraft arm of Pratt & Whitney and later founded its current parent company, United Technologies. The earliest reference to the field which has been located was in the Airport Directory Company's 1933 Airports Directory, describing Rentschler Field as consisting of a 2,700' x 2,500' turf landing area and the operator was American Airways, which provided scheduled transport along the New York - Boston route.

During World War II, Rentschler Field was used by the Army Air Force to provide fighter coverage for the area. In 1999, it was decommissioned as an airport and donated to the state of Connecticut by United Technologies in 1999. A portion of the former airport was redeveloped as Rentschler Field, the University of Connecticut's new football stadium, which opened in 2003.

As of 2006, the only remaining aviation use on the site was the Rentschler Heliport, a private facility operated by Pratt & Whitney.
