= Old Killingly High School =

- U.S. National Register of Historic Places
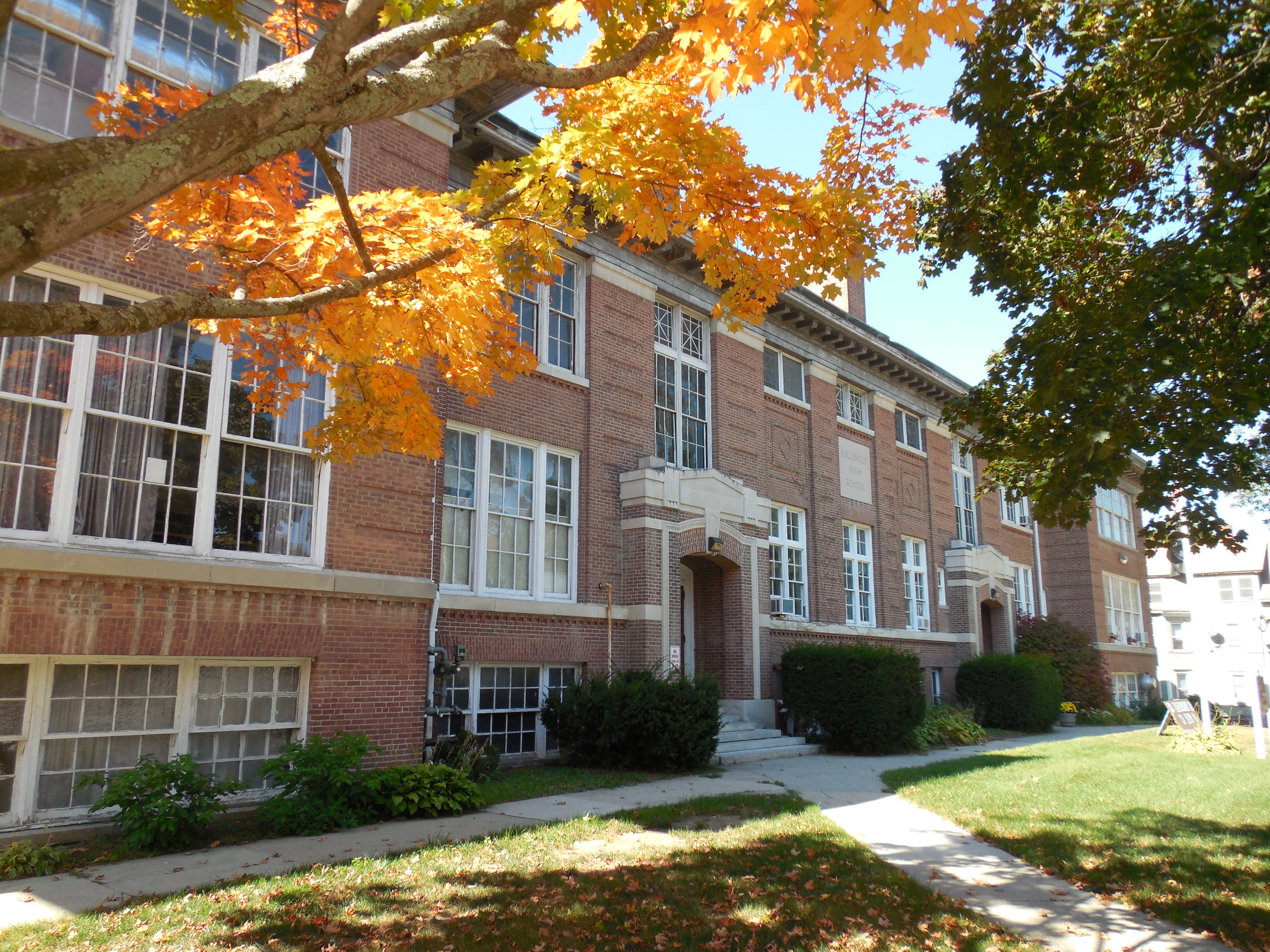
- Old Killingly High School

- Location within Connecticut Location within the United States
- Location: Killingly, Connecticut
- Coordinates: 41°48′14″N 71°52′49″W
- Area: less than one acre
- Built: 1908
- Architect: Hartwell, Richardson & Driver; A. Fales & Sons Co.
- Architectural style: Colonial Revival, Renaissance
- NRHP reference No.: 92000266
- Added to NRHP: March 26, 1992

The Old Killingly High School is a historic school building on 185 Broad Street in the Danielson section of Killingly, Connecticut. Built in 1908 and enlarged in 1927, it served as the town's high school until 1965, and then its junior high school until 1990. It is a significant local example of Renaissance and Colonial Revival architecture, designed by Hartwell, Richardson & Driver. It was listed on the National Register of Historic Places in 1992. It now houses the Killingly Police Department.

== Description and history ==
The Old Killingly High School is located in a densely built residential neighborhood east of downtown Danielson, at the northwest corner of Broad and Cottage Streets. It is a two-story brick structure with a hip roof and limestone trim. It consists of a central main block, to which slightly projecting wings have been added. The building corners have patterned brick quoining, a detail repeated in pilasters flanking the two main entrances and articulating the central section bays. The entrances project slightly, and are framed by segmented-arch openings topped by limestone peaked gables.

The school was built in 1908 and enlarged with side wings in 1927. It was considered state of the art for its time, with fireproof construction, wide hallways, and large bands of windows to maximize lighting of the classrooms. It was designed by Hartwell, Richardson & Driver, a leading architectural firm based in Boston, Massachusetts. The building served as the community's high school until 1965, and as its junior high school 1966–90. Its most recent usage is as the town's police headquarters and community center.

== See also ==
- National Register of Historic Places listings in Windham County, Connecticut
