= Elliottville Lower Mill =

- U.S. National Register of Historic Places
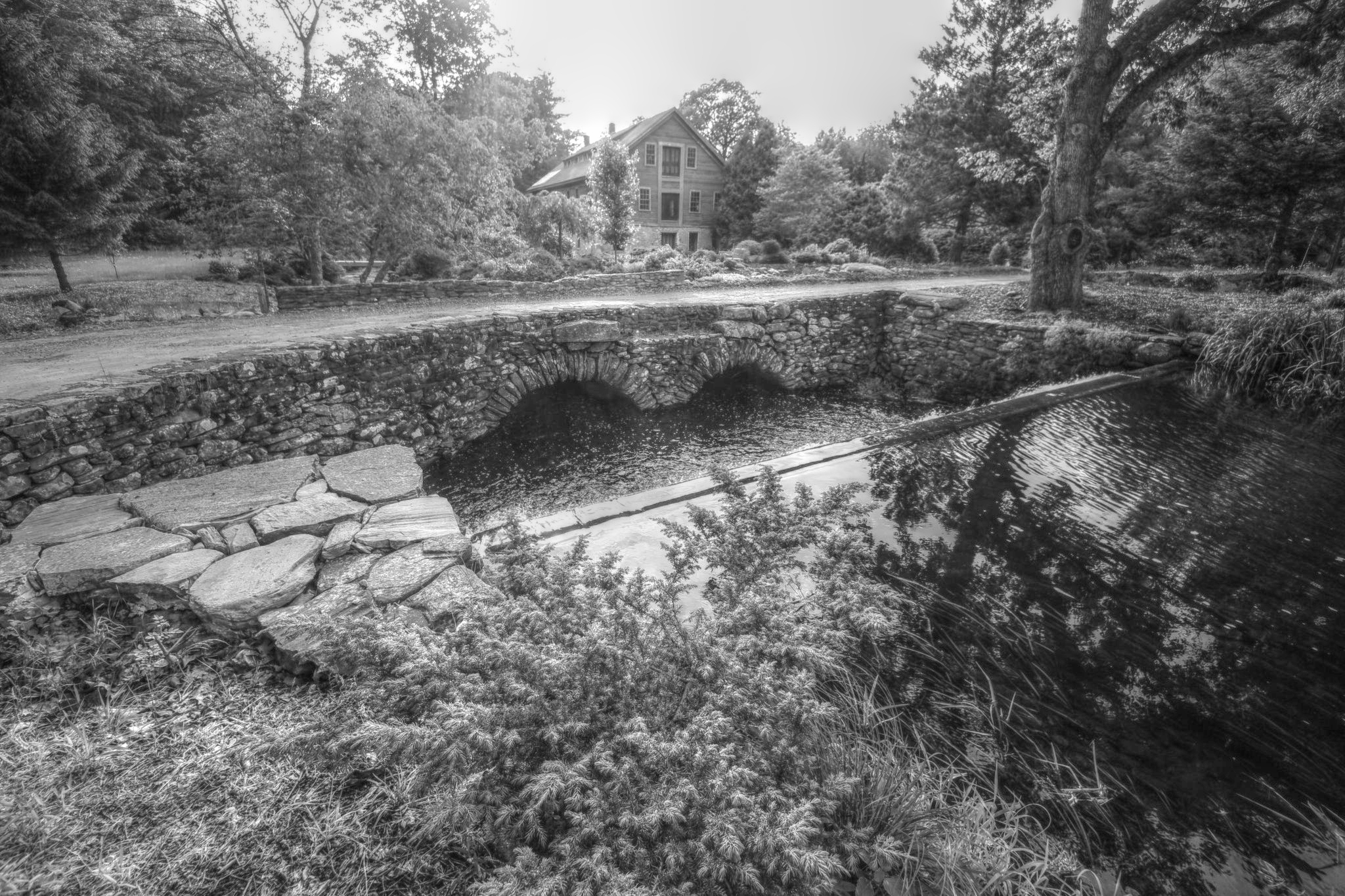
- Elliottville Lower Mill

- Location within Connecticut Location within the United States
- Location: Peep Toad Road, East Killingly, Connecticut
- Coordinates: 41°50′21″N 71°50′33″W
- Area: 2.8 acres (1.1 ha)
- Built: 1850
- NRHP reference No.: 82004406
- Added to NRHP: April 15, 1982

The Elliottville Lower Mill, also known historically as the Peep Toad Mill, is an historic cotton mill in the East Killingly section of Killingly, Connecticut. Built about 1850, it is a well-preserved example of an early wood-frame textile mill. The mill complex, which includes, a dam, pond, head race, and bridge, was listed on the National Register of Historic Places in 1982.

== Description and history ==
The Elliottville Lower Mill is located in what is now a rural setting of eastern Killingly, on Peep Toad Road where it crosses Whetstone Brook. The mill complex occupies 2.8 acres (1.1 ha), and consists of a single building, along with a mill dam, pond, raceway, and a rubble stone-arch bridge which carries Peep Toad Road across the brook. The mill is of modest scale, 2 1/2 stories in height with a gable roof, and is built of stone and wood framing. It is set across the road from the mill pond and dam.

The mill was built c. 1850 by the Elliotville Manufacturing Company, whose larger main mill was upstream from this complex. It is a rare surviving example of a wood-frame textile mill, many of which were built but few of which survive, due to fires and/or later expansion of the premises. The Elliottville Manufacturing Company was formed in the 1830s by Killingly residents Thomas Pray and Henry Westcott, who built their first ("upper") mill upstream from this one in the 1830s. Some local histories claim that this building is an older structure originally used as a saw and grist mill, but its construction methods are consistent with surviving buildings at the site of the upper mill. In 1844 Pray and Westcott sold their enterprise to Albert Elliott and Nelson Eddy, with Welcome Bartlett joining as a partner later on. This mill, built by that partnership, was used for spinning and preparation of warps used in the upper mill. The company remained in operation through the 1880s. In the 20th century the mill building was adapted for use as a private residence and art studio.

== See also ==
- National Register of Historic Places listings in Windham County, Connecticut
