= Five Mile River =

Fivemile River
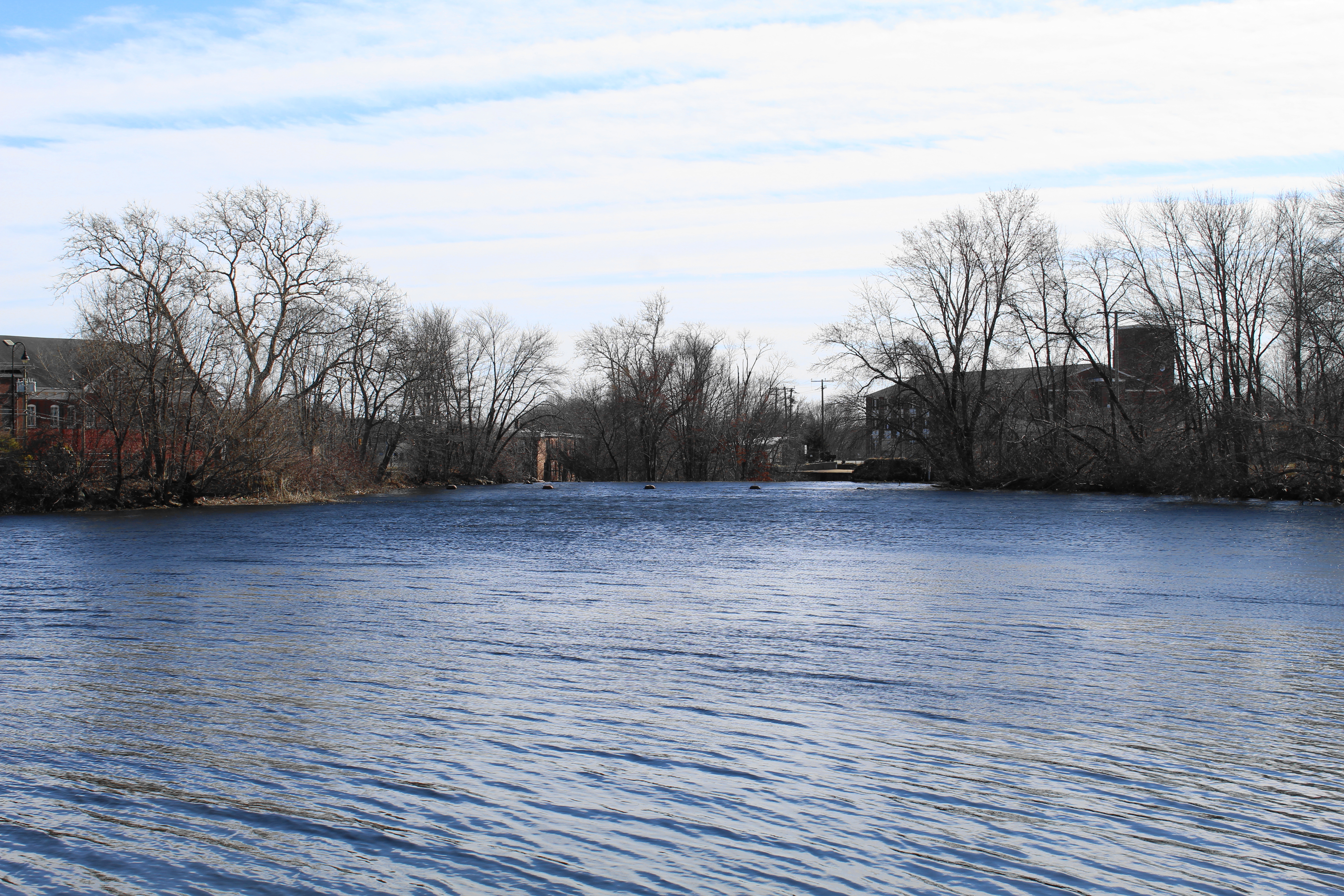
- Five Mile River near Danielson.

Location
- Country: United States
- State: Connecticut
- County: Windham
- Cities: Thompson, Putnam, Killingly

Physical characteristics
- Source: Little Pond 42.014592°N 71.840801°W
  - location: Thompson, Windham County, Connecticut, United States
  - elevation: 480 ft (150 m)
- Mouth: Empties into Quinebaug River 41.801568°N 71.887077°W
  - location: Danielson, Windham County, Connecticut, United States
  - elevation: 185 ft (56 m)
- Length: 23.5 mi (37.8 km)
- Discharge
  - location: Danielson, CT

The Five Mile River is a 23.5-mile-long (37.8 km) river located in Connecticut's northeast corner which flows through the towns of Thompson, Putnam, and Killingly. The original Nipmuc name was Assawaga, meaning "place between" or "halfway place". The Assawaga received its English name from the fact that the first land laid out upon it was "supposed to be about five miles from" Woodstock, Connecticut. The Five Mile is a tributary of the Quinebaug River and is part of the Thames River watershed. Its source is Little Pond (also known as Schoolhouse Pond), close to the Massachusetts border. It empties into the Quinebaug River at Danielson, near the intersection of Connecticut Route 12 and U.S. Route 6.

The Five Mile River has several dams, most of which are remnants of defunct mills and some of which are still used by local industry. Its largest impoundment is Quaddick Reservoir. The best examples of surviving mill villages are Killingly in villages such as Pineville, Ballouville, Attawaugan and Dayville.

== See also ==
- List of rivers of Connecticut
