= Dayville Historic District =

Historic district in Connecticut, United States

- U.S. National Register of Historic Places
- U.S. Historic district
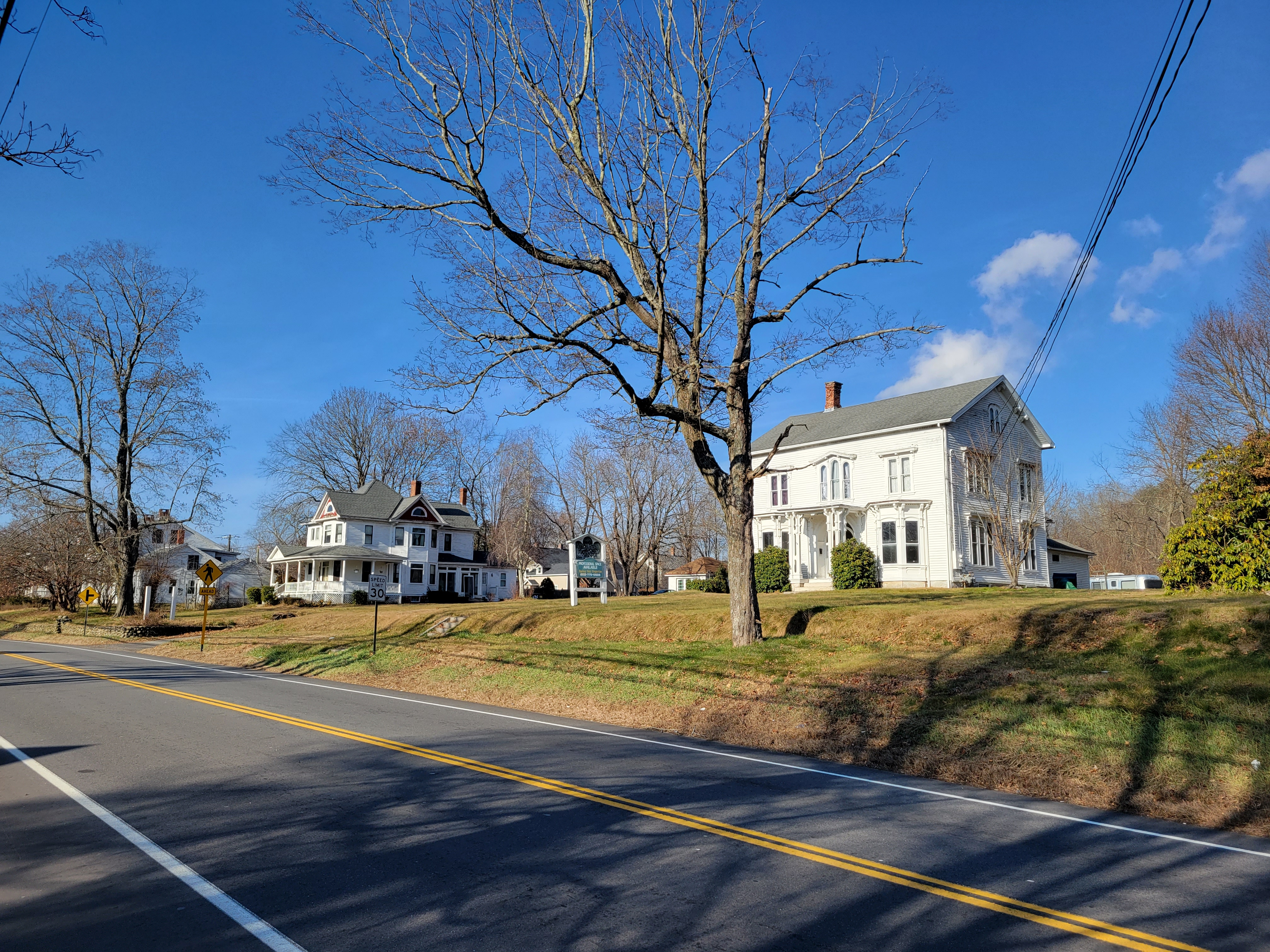
- William LaBelle House (left) Warren Potter House (right)

- Location within Connecticut Location within the United States
- Location: Main and Pleasant Streets, Killingly, Connecticut
- Coordinates: 41°50′45″N 71°53′8″W
- Area: 15 acres (6.1 ha)
- Architect: Blanchard, Alexander; Et al.
- Architectural style: Greek Revival, Italianate, Queen Anne
- NRHP reference No.: 88001422
- Added to NRHP: August 25, 1988

The Dayville Historic District encompasses a collection of mid-19th century architecture in the Dayville village of Killingly, Connecticut. It is clustered around the Junction of Main and Pleasant Streets, extending along Main to High Street. The area flourished in the mid-19th century, as a consequence of the railroad being routed nearby, serving area textile mills. The district, residential except for a church, was added to the National Register of Historic Places in 1988.

== Description and history ==
The village of Dayville was named after Capt. John Day, who owned the water privileges on the Five Mile River. With the opening of the Norwich and Worcester Railroad in 1830, Dayville also became a hub for freight transport for other manufacturing villages along the river. By 1849, the village had grown sufficiently in population to have its own church, the Dayville Congregational Church, a Greek revival building built by Alexander Blanchard. Blanchard's own house is a fine example of Greek Revival architecture built about 1845, featuring a temple front. John Day's house was also built around that time, and also features a temple front.

The district also has fine examples of Italianate and Queen Anne architecture, often built for owners of area mills or other commercial enterprises. The Thomas Sayles House, built in 1866, also includes a period carriage barn. The Henry Hammond House, built about 1888, is a blend of these two styles, with Italianate brackets and turned porch balusters. A late example of the Queen Anne is the William Labelle House, built in 1912.

== See also ==
- National Register of Historic Places listings in Windham County, Connecticut
