= Borough (Connecticut) =

Level of government in Connecticut

In the U.S. state of Connecticut, a borough is an incorporated section of a town. Borough governments are not autonomous and are subordinate to the government of the town to which they belong. For example, Fenwick is a borough in Old Saybrook. A borough is a clearly defined municipality and provides some municipal services, such as police and fire services, garbage collection, street lighting and maintenance, management of cemeteries, and building code enforcement. Other municipal services not provided by the borough are provided by the parent town. Connecticut boroughs are administratively similar to villages in New York. Borough elections are held biennially in odd years on the first Monday in May.

== Historical background ==
Bridgeport (now a separate city) was the state's first borough, formed in 1800 or 1801 as a subdivision of the town of Stratford. Numerous additional boroughs were established thereafter, mostly during the 19th century, to serve a variety of local governmental purposes. There were 18 boroughs in the state as of 1850 and a total of 26 as of 1910. Most Connecticut boroughs have subsequently disincorporated or have become cities. An example of a former borough is Willimantic located in the Town of Windham. It was originally incorporated as a borough in 1833, re-incorporated as a city in 1893 and in 1983 was dis-incorporated becoming a special service district within the town of Windham under the town's governmental control.

== List of boroughs ==
As of 2016, there are nine boroughs in Connecticut, four of which share the name of the town in which they are located. Of the current boroughs, one (Naugatuck) is consolidated with its town. Litchfield is the only town to have two incorporated boroughs located within its limits. Below is a list of boroughs that have existed ordered by date of incorporation. Currently existing boroughs are indicated in boldface.

Borough	Parent town	Date incorporated	Current status
Bridgeport	Stratford	1800	Consolidated city-town separate from original parent town since 1889
**Stonington**	Stonington	1801	Borough
Guilford	Guilford	1815	Disincorporated 1941
Essex	Deep River (Saybrook)	1820	Disincorporated 1854 when Town of Essex was incorporated
Killingworth (Clinton)	Killingworth	1820	Disincorporated 1838 when Town of Clinton was incorporated
Danbury	Danbury	1822	Consolidated city-town since 1965
**Newtown**	Newtown	1824	Borough
Colchester	Colchester	1824/1846	Disincorporated 1990
Waterbury	Waterbury	1825	Consolidated city-town since 1902
Stamford	Stamford	1830	Consolidated city-town since 1949
Southport	Fairfield	1831	Disincorporated 1854
Willimantic	Windham	1833	Disincorporated 1893 when City of Willimantic was incorporated
Clifton	Winchester	1833	Disincorporated 1858 (Became part of new Borough of Winsted)
Worthington	Berlin	1834	Disincorporated ?
Norwalk	Norwalk	1836	Consolidated city-town since 1913
Humphreysville	Derby	1836	Disincorporated 1850 when Town of Seymour was incorporated
Bethel	Danbury	1847	Town of Bethel separated from Danbury in 1855; Borough disincorporated (?)
New Britain	New Britain	1850	Consolidated city-town since 1906
Birmingham	Derby	1851	Consolidated city-town since 1893 (as Derby)
Wallingford	Wallingford	1853	Disincorporated 1958
Sharon	Sharon	1853	Disincorporated ?
**Danielson**	Killingly	1854	Borough
Greenwich	Greenwich	1854	Disincorporated 1932
Winsted	Winchester	1858	Consolidated with Winchester 1915; chartered as city in 1917, although the US Census Bureau rescinded recognition sometime between 1970 and 1980.
Ansonia	Derby	1864	Consolidated city-town in 1893, separated from original parent town in 1889 when town of Ansonia was incorporated
Branford	Branford	1867	Disincorporated 1970s
Fair Haven East	East Haven (annexed to New Haven in 1881)	1872	Disincorporated 1897
West Stratford	Stratford	1873	Disincorporated 1889 (now part of the city of Bridgeport)
West Haven	Orange	1873	Consolidated city-town since 1961, separated from parent town of Orange since 1921
Stafford Springs	Stafford	1873	Disincorporated 1991
**Litchfield**	Litchfield	1879	Borough
Shelton	Shelton (Huntington)	1882	Consolidated city-town since 1915
Torrington	Torrington	1887	Consolidated city-town since 1923
New Canaan	New Canaan	1889	Disincorporated 1935
Southington	Southington	1889	Disincorporated 1948
**Naugatuck**	Naugatuck	1893	Consolidated borough-town since 1895
Bristol	Bristol	1893	Consolidated city-town since 1911
**Jewett City**	Griswold	1895	Borough
**Fenwick**	Old Saybrook	1899	Borough
Farmington	Farmington	1901	Disincorporated 1947
Ridgefield	Ridgefield	1901	Disincorporated 1921
Groton	Groton	1903	Chartered as non-coextensive city in 1964
**Woodmont**	Milford	1903	Borough
**Bantam**	Litchfield	1915	Borough
Unionville	Farmington	1921	Disincorporated 1947

== See also ==
- Administrative divisions of Connecticut
- Borough
