= Killingly, Connecticut =

- Town
- Town of Killingly
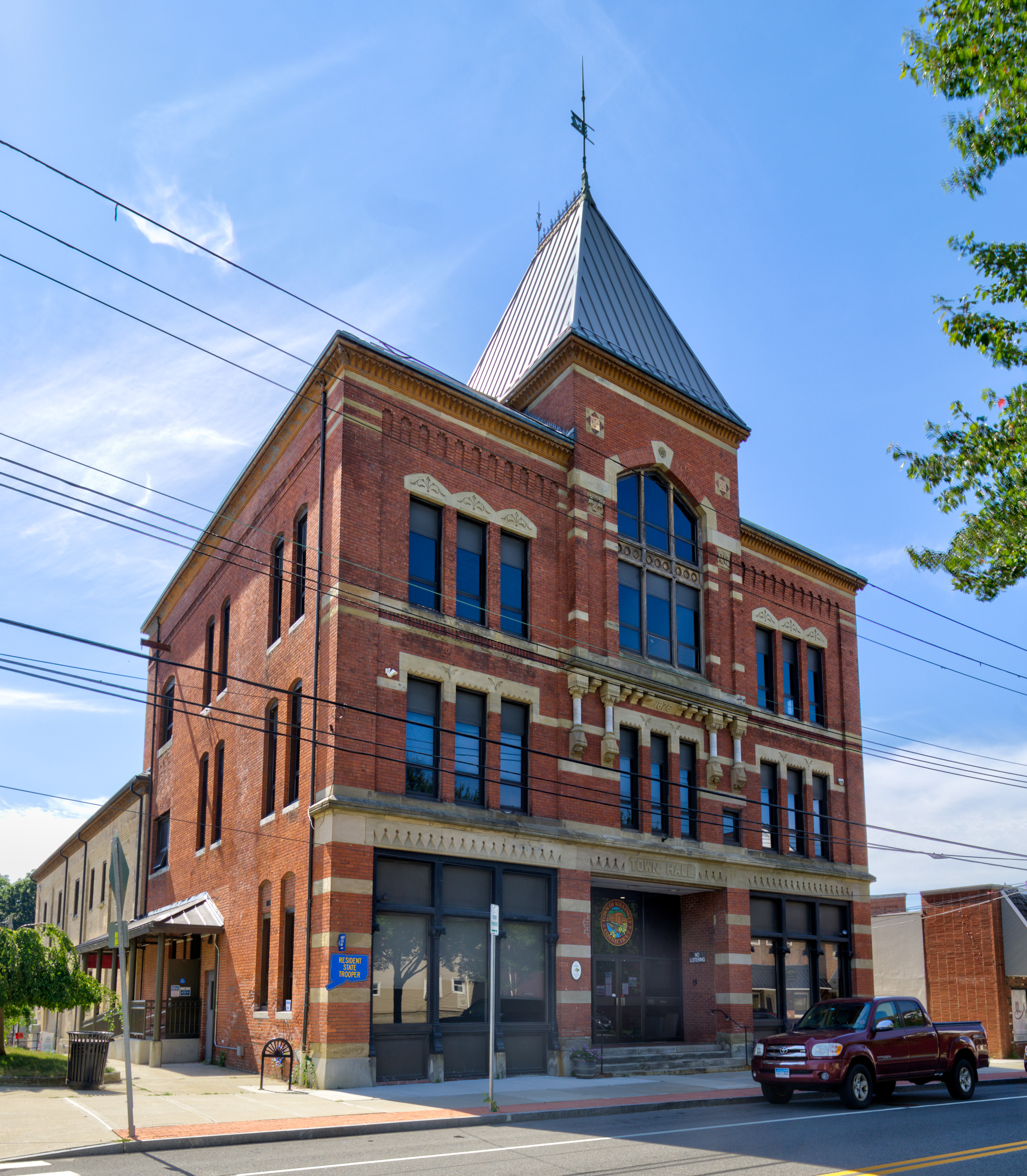
- Killingly Town Hall

- Seal
- Interactive map of Killingly, Connecticut
- Coordinates: 41°49′53″N 71°51′01″W
- Country: United States
- U.S. state: Connecticut
- County: Windham
- Region: Northeastern CT
- Incorporated: 1708

Government
  - Type: Council-manager
  - Town manager: Brian Palaia
  - Council chairman: Ed Grandelski

Area
  - Total: 50.0 sq mi (129.5 km^{2})
  - Land: 48.5 sq mi (125.7 km^{2})
  - Water: 1.5 sq mi (3.8 km^{2})
- Elevation: 449 ft (137 m)

Population (2020)
  - Total: 17,752
  - Density: 366/sq mi (141.2/km^{2})
- Time zone: UTC-5 (Eastern)
  - Summer (DST): UTC-4 (Eastern)
- ZIP code: 06239, 06241, 06243
- Area codes: 860/959
- FIPS code: 09-40500
- GNIS feature ID: 0213447
- Website: www.killinglyct.gov

Historical population
Census	Pop.	Note	%±
1820	2,803		—
1840	3,685		—
1850	4,543		23.3%
1860	4,926		8.4%
1870	5,712		16.0%
1880	6,921		21.2%
1890	7,027		1.5%
1900	6,835		−2.7%
1910	6,564		−4.0%
1920	8,178		24.6%
1930	8,852		8.2%
1940	9,547		7.9%
1950	10,015		4.9%
1960	11,298		12.8%
1970	13,573		20.1%
1980	14,519		7.0%
1990	15,889		9.4%
2000	16,472		3.7%
2010	17,370		5.5%
2020	17,752		2.2%
US Decennial Census

Killingly is a town in Windham County, Connecticut, United States. Killingly is the largest town by population in the Northeastern Connecticut Planning Region. The population was 17,752 at the 2020 census. It consists of the borough of Danielson and the villages of Attawaugan, Ballouville, Dayville, East Killingly, Rogers, and South Killingly.

== History ==
In 1653, the second John Winthrop, son of Massachusetts Bay Colony's founding governor, obtained a grant of land formerly held by the Quinebaug Indian tribe and known as the Quinebaug (Long Pond) Country. The name Quinebaug comes from the southern New England Native American term, spelled variously Qunnubbâgge, Quinibauge, etc., meaning "long pond", from qunni-, "long", and -paug, "pond".

The area in that grant, which is now occupied by Killingly, was first settled by English colonists in 1700. It was first called "Aspinock", a word which may have come from the combination of the native term "aucks" or "ock" (the place of/where) and the name of the English settler, Lieutenant Aspinwall. When the town was incorporated in May 1708, Colony Governor Saltonstall was asked to suggest a name. Saltonstall's ancestral manorial possessions lay in Killanslie and Pontefract, Yorkshire, hence he suggested “Kellingly” (the spelling was later altered).

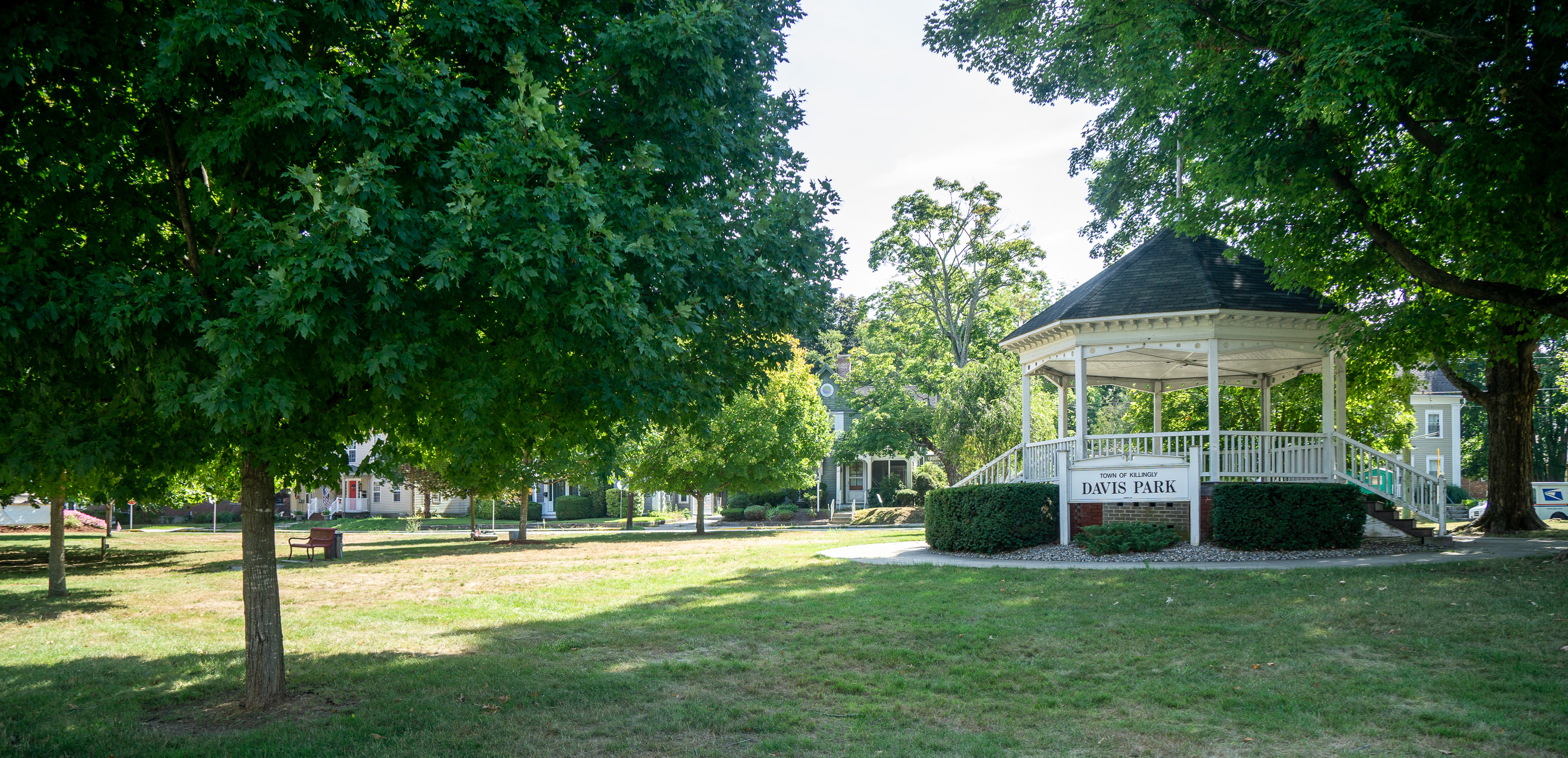
Davis Park

During the 1830s, Killingly was the state's largest producer of cotton goods, manufacturing textiles in mills from cotton shipped from the Deep South. By the 1930s, it was an important producer of window curtains.

== Geography ==
According to the United States Census Bureau, the town has a total area of 50.0 square miles (129 km^{2}), of which 48.5 square miles (126 km^{2}) is land and 1.5 square miles (3.9 km^{2}) (2.94%) is water.

=== Principal communities ===
- Attawaugan
- Ballouville
- Chestnut Hill
- Danielson (borough)
- Dayville
- East Killingly
- Elmville
- Killingly Center
- Rogers
- South Killingly

== On the National Register of Historic Places ==
- Broad Street – Davis Park Historic District – Roughly along Broad Street, from Dorrance Street to Winter Street (added 1998)
- Daniel's Village Archeological Site (added 1978)
- Danielson Main Street Historic District – Main Street from Water Street to Spring Street (added 1992), featuring Colonial Revival and Italianate architectural styles.
- Dayville Historic District – Main and Pleasant Streets (added 1988)
- Elliottville Lower Mill – Peep Toad Road (added 1982)
- Old Killingly High School – 185 Broad Street (added 1992)
- Temple Beth Israel – 39 Killingly Drive (added 2003)

== Demographics ==
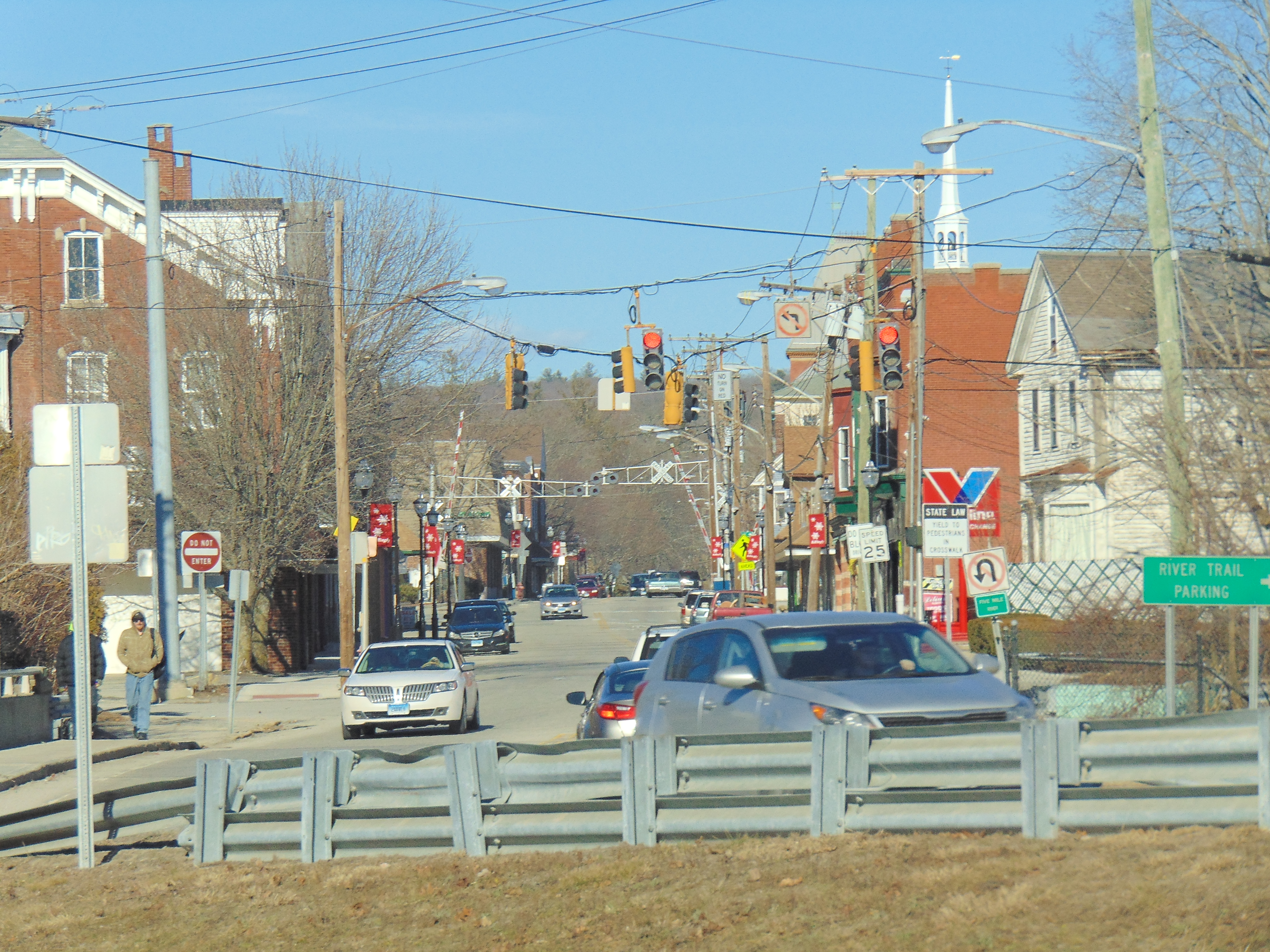
Main Street in Danielson, Connecticut

As of the 2010 United States census, there were 17,370 people, 6,749 households, and 4,528 families in the town. The population density was 358.1/square mile (137.9/km^{2}). There were 7,592 housing units at an average density of 156.5/square mile (60.3/km^{2}). The racial makeup of the town was 93.1% White, 1.5% African American, 0.4% Native American, 1.8% Asian, 0.7% from other races, and 2.4% from two or more races. Hispanic or Latino of any race were 3.0% of the population.

The borough of Danielson and the town of Killingly contain a small Laotian community. Both are on the nation's list of top 50 cities with the highest percentage of citizens claiming Laotian ancestry.

Of the 6,749 households: 29.2% had children under the age of 18 living with them, 47.8% were married couples living together, 13.2% had a female householder with no husband present, and 32.9% were non-families. 25.1% of all households were made up of individuals, and 9.9% had someone living alone who was 65 years of age or older. The average household size was 2.52 and the average family size was 2.98.

The area population contained 22.4% under the age of 18, 8.2% from 18 to 24, 27.0% from 25 to 44, 28.5% from 45 to 64, and 13.9% who were 65 years of age or older. The median age was 40 years. For every 100 females, there were 97.4 males. For every 100 females age 18 and over, there were 94.7 males.

The median income for a household in the town was $55,598, and the median income for a family was $68,565. Males had a median income of $49,467 versus $35,429 for females. The per capita income for the town was $26,585. About 8.5% of families and 10.3% of the population were below the poverty line, including 12.7% of those under age 18 and 6.1% of those age 65 or over.

Voter registration and party enrollment as of November 2022
Party	Active voters	Inactive voters	Total voters	Percentage
Democratic	2,375	495	2,870	22.77%
Republican	2,529	400	2,929	23.24%
Unaffiliated	5,181	1352	6,533	51.84%
Minor parties	235	36	271	2.15%
Total	10,320	2283	12,603	100%

Presidential Election Results
Year	Democratic	Republican	Third Parties
2020	41.1% 3,402	56.5% 4,678	2.4% 201
2016	36.2% 2,491	57.0% 3,916	6.8% 467
2012	54.0% 3,259	44.1% 2,663	2.0% 118
2008	55.2% 3,629	42.8% 2,815	1.9% 127
2004	51.6% 3,341	46.2% 2,993	2.3% 147
2000	56.0% 3,178	37.9% 2,151	6.0% 342
1996	52.4% 2,915	29.8% 1,658	17.8% 989
1992	32.5% 2,106	38.1% 2,467	29.4% 1,906
1988	46.4% 2,569	52.3% 2,899	1.3% 73
1984	36.9% 2,086	62.9% 3,554	0.3% 15
1980	41.0% 2,281	48.0% 2,675	11.0% 614
1976	54.7% 3,077	44.8% 2,521	0.6% 31
1972	41.2% 2,271	57.0% 3,140	1.7% 96
1968	57.9% 2,983	38.7% 1,995	3.4% 174
1964	76.3% 4,016	23.7% 1,245	0.0% 0
1960	68.4% 3,359	31.6% 1,551	0.0% 0
1956	42.5% 2,311	57.6% 3,133	0.0% 0
1952	49.6% 2,706	50.2% 2,743	0.2% 11
1948	56.3% 2,779	43.0% 2,120	0.8% 37
1944	56.9% 2,540	43.1% 1,923	0.0% 0
1940	55.8% 2,538	44.2% 2,007	0.0% 0
1936	51.4% 2,048	48.6% 1,939	0.00% 0
1932	53.0% 1,762	47.0% 1,563	0.0% 0
1928	46.1% 1,334	53.8% 1,557	0.2% 6
1924	31.6% 690	63.7% 1,393	4.8% 104

== Transportation ==
Danielson Airport is a state owned, public use airport located two nautical miles (4 km) northwest of the central business district of Danielson, a borough in Killingly.

Bus service to the area is provided by the Northeastern Connecticut Transit District.

== Notable people ==
- Francis Alexander (1800–1881), born in Killingly, was a portrait painter
- Harriet Pritchard Arnold (1858–1901), writer
- Manasseh Cutler (1742–1823), US representative, soldier, minister, botanist, doctor, and scientist. He was educated at both Yale and Harvard Universities. He lobbied Congress to pass the Northwest Ordinance of 1787, helped establish the Ohio Company, and worked to found Ohio University
- John M. Dowe (1896–1946), Connecticut State Comptroller (1941–1943, 1945–1946)
- Frederick Delmont Chesbrough (1859-1943), inventor of Warp Stop Motion for automated looms.
- William Torrey Harris (1835–1909), a philosopher who introduced reindeer to Alaska, educator (and later U.S. Commissioner of Education) who introduced the first permanent kindergarten, and lexicographer who introduced the "divided page" into dictionaries (the 1909 edition of Webster's New International Dictionary). He was born in North Killingly. He also founded the first philosophical journal in the country
- Mary Dixon Kies (1752–1837), the first woman in the United States to receive a patent (in 1809, for a method of weaving straw with silk or thread). Kies was born and lived in South Killingly, an unincorporated village in the Town of Killingly
- Samuel Knight (1731–1804), chief justice of the Vermont Supreme Court
- Charles Tiffany (1812–1902) born in town, became the owner of Tiffany and Company
- Ebenezer Young (1783–1851), a United States representative from Connecticut
