= Danielson, Connecticut =

- Borough
- Borough of Danielson
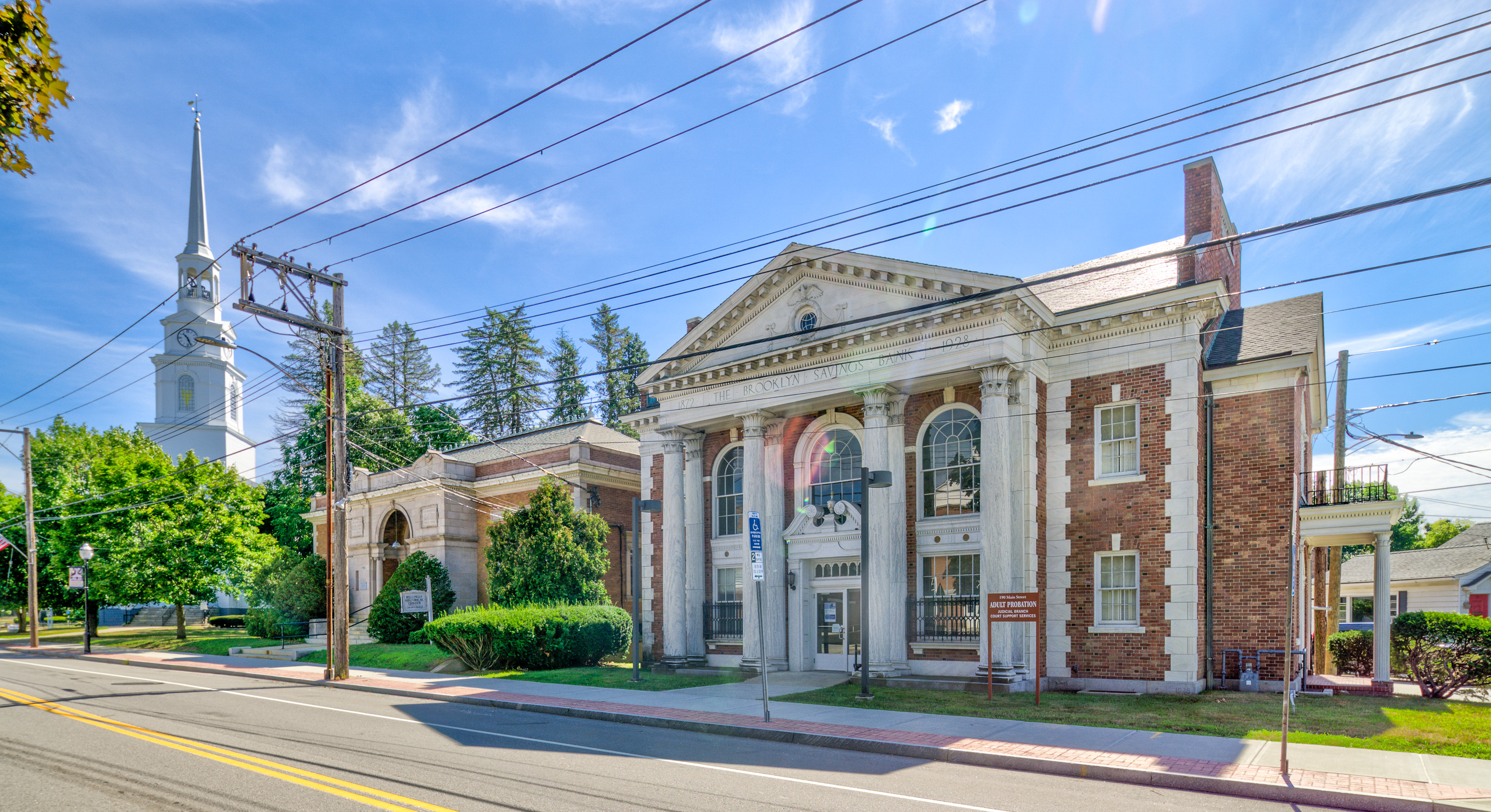
- Looking down Main Street
- Interactive map of Danielson, Connecticut
- Coordinates: 41°48′29″N 71°53′03″W
- Country: United States
- U.S. state: Connecticut
- County: Windham
- Region: Northeastern CT
- Town: Killingly

Area
  - Total: 1.16 sq mi (3.00 km^{2})
  - Land: 1.09 sq mi (2.83 km^{2})
  - Water: 0.066 sq mi (0.17 km^{2})
- Elevation: 223 ft (68 m)

Population (2020)
  - Total: 4,155
  - Density: 3,800/sq mi (1,470/km^{2})
- Time zone: UTC−5 (Eastern (EST))
  - Summer (DST): UTC−4 (EDT)
- ZIP Code: 06239
- Area code: 860
- FIPS code: 09-18780
- GNIS feature ID: 0206590
- Website: www.boroughofdanielson.org

Danielson is a borough in the town of Killingly in Windham County, Connecticut, United States. The population was 4,155 at the 2020 census.

== History ==
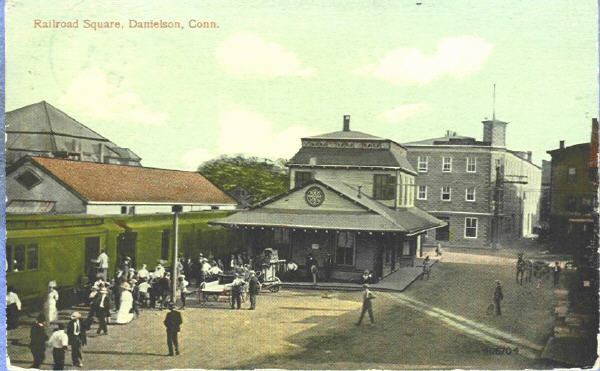
Railroad Square, c. 1918

Danielson was originally named "Danielsonville" for Gen. James Danielson, the builder of the first house in the settlement, and extended into the neighboring town of Brooklyn. It was renamed Danielson and given its present boundaries in 1895.

=== Historic districts ===
Danielson is the site of two historic districts listed on the National Register of Historic Places:

- Danielson Main Street Historic District is a 20-acre (8.1 ha) historic district along Main Street, from Water Street to Spring Street. Architectural styles in the district include Colonial Revival and Italianate, as well as others. The Danielson Main Street Historic District was added to the National Register of Historic Places on April 8, 1992.
- Broad Street – Davis Park Historic District: Roughly along Broad Street, from Dorrance Street to Winter Street, to the north of Danielson Main Street Historic District. Architectural styles represented include Stick/Eastlake, Queen Anne, and Colonial Revival. It was added to the National Register of Historic Places in 1998.

It additionally is home to the Temple Beth Israel synagogue, which was added to the National Register of Historic Places in 2003. Danielson is also home to the CT State Police barracks "D".

== Geography ==
According to the United States Census Bureau, the borough has a total area of 1.2 square miles (3.1 km^{2}), of which 1.1 square miles (2.8 km^{2}) is land and 0.1 square miles (0.26 km^{2}) (9.02%) is water.

== Demographics ==
Historical population
Census	Pop.	Note	%±
1900	2,823		—
1910	2,934		3.9%
1920	3,130		6.7%
1930	4,210		34.5%
1940	4,507		7.1%
1950	4,554		1.0%
1960	4,642		1.9%
1970	4,580		−1.3%
1980	4,553		−0.6%
1990	4,441		−2.5%
2000	4,265		−4.0%
2010	4,051		−5.0%
2020	4,155		2.6%
U.S. Decennial Census

=== 2020 census ===
As of the 2020 census, Danielson had a population of 4,155. The median age was 36.8 years. 20.8% of residents were under the age of 18 and 12.5% of residents were 65 years of age or older. For every 100 females there were 96.7 males, and for every 100 females age 18 and over there were 96.0 males age 18 and over.

100.0% of residents lived in urban areas, while 0.0% lived in rural areas.

There were 1,768 households in Danielson, of which 29.3% had children under the age of 18 living in them. Of all households, 29.7% were married-couple households, 23.9% were households with a male householder and no spouse or partner present, and 32.0% were households with a female householder and no spouse or partner present. About 32.6% of all households were made up of individuals and 10.0% had someone living alone who was 65 years of age or older.

There were 1,926 housing units, of which 8.2% were vacant. The homeowner vacancy rate was 1.9% and the rental vacancy rate was 5.3%.

Racial composition as of the 2020 census
Race	Number	Percent
White	3,466	83.4%
Black or African American	79	1.9%
American Indian and Alaska Native	12	0.3%
Asian	131	3.2%
Native Hawaiian and Other Pacific Islander	0	0.0%
Some other race	133	3.2%
Two or more races	334	8.0%
Hispanic or Latino (of any race)	329	7.9%

=== 2010 census ===
As of the census of 2010, there were 4,051 people, 1,627 households, and 975 families residing in the borough. The population density was 3,682.7 inhabitants per square mile (1,421.9/km^{2}). There were 1,627 housing units at an average density of 1,479.0 units per square mile (571.0 units/km^{2}). The racial makeup of the borough was 88.7% White, 2.8% African American, 0.5% Native American, 2.9% Asian, 1.5% from other races, and 3.5% from two or more races. Hispanic or Latino of any race were 5.7% of the population.

Of the 1,627 households: 29.9% had children under the age of 18 living with them, 34.4% were married couples living together, 17.9% had a female householder with no husband present, and 40.1% were non-families. Of all households 30.2% were made up of individuals, and 9.6% had someone living alone who was 65 years of age or older. The average household size was 2.45 and the average family size was 2.99.

In the borough, the population was spread out, with 24.0% under the age of 18, 10.9% from 18 to 24, 30.6% from 25 to 44, 24.5% from 45 to 64, and 10.0% who were 65 years of age or older. The median age was 35 years. For every 100 females, there were 96.9 males. For every 100 females age 18 and over, there were 95.9 males.

The median income for a household in the borough was $58,933, and the median income for a family was $62,803. Males had a median income of $44,235 versus $34,236 for females. The per capita income for the borough was $23,935. About 9.6% of families and 14.1% of the population were below the poverty line, including 21.1% of those under age 18 and 6.8% of those age 65 or over.

=== Ancestry ===
The borough of Danielson and the town of Killingly are home to a small Laotian community. Both Danielson and Killingly are on the nation's list of top 50 cities with the highest percentage of citizens claiming Laotian ancestry. The first Laotian family came to Danielson in September 1979. They were sponsored by a local couple, Daniel and Carolyn O'Leary. The O'Leary family proceeded to sponsor nearly 500 Laotian refugees over the next decade.

== Transportation ==
Danielson Airport is a state owned, public use airport located two nautical miles (4 km) northwest of the central business district of Danielson. I-395 runs north and south through the town, and is the primary road for the borough. US 6 is the east–west road through the town, and severs the southern part of downtown. Route 12 runs through and severs downtown.

== Notable people ==
- Ida Bailey Allen (1885–1973), American chef and cookbook author, once popularly known as "The Nation's Homemaker"
- Theodore J. Cusson (1936–2023), American politician, member of the New Hampshire House of Representatives
- Frank Dascoli (1913–1990), National League umpire
- Sarah Katherine Taylor (1847–1920), American evangelist, temperance activist, newspaper editor
- Charles Lewis Tiffany (1812–1902), a leader in the nineteenth-century American jewelry trade and founded New York City's Tiffany & Co. in 1837
