= Yankee Terminal Radar Approach Control =

Coordinates: 41.9456°N 72.6889°W

The Yankee Terminal Radar Approach Control (colloquially known as Yankee TRACON) (FAA LID: Y90) is a terminal air traffic control facility located in Windsor Locks, Connecticut, operated by the Federal Aviation Administration.

== Description ==
Located at the Bradley International Airport (BDL), Yankee TRACON is a TRACON responsible for the airspace roughly in a 40-mile radius around BDL at or below 10,000 feet. This airspace includes airports such as Hartford-Brainard Airport (HFD), Meriden Markham Municipal Airport (MMK), Barnes Municipal Airport (BAF), Westover Metropolitan Airport (CEF), Worcester Regional Airport (ORH), Windham Airport (IJD), Northampton Airport (7B2), Skylark Airpark (7B6), Ellington Airport (7B9), Robertson Field (4B8), and Simsbury Airport (4B9).

Yankee TRACON has five operating radar positions and is staffed with about 31 controllers and three Front Line Managers (supervisors). During calendar year 2008, Yankee TRACON worked 245,000 IFR operations.

== See also ==
- Boston Consolidated TRACON
