= Flight 100 =

Flight 100 may refer to:

Listed chronologically

- Pan Am Flight 100, involved in a mid-air collision on 30 January 1949
- Swissair Flight 100, hijacked over France as part of the Dawson's Field hijackings in September 1970
- Asian Spirit Flight 100, crashed into a mountain in the Philippines on 7 December 1999
- Airjet Angola Flight 100, crashed after landing gear collapse in the Democratic Republic of the Congo on 17 November 2025

== See also ==
- STS-100, a successful Space Shuttle mission in April–May 2001
