= C44 =

C44 may refer to:

- C-44 Canal in Florida
- C44 road (Namibia)
- Canada Business Corporations Act, Bill C-44 of the Parliament of Canada
- Channel 44 (Adelaide), an Australian community television station
- Citroën C44, a French prototype military vehicle based on the Volkswagen Iltis jeep
- HMS Jamaica (C44), a Fiji-class cruiser of the Royal Navy
- Messerschmitt C-44, a German sport and touring aircraft purchased by the United States Army Air Corps
- Scotch Game, a chess opening
- Skin cancer
- Toutant Airport in Woodstock Valley, Connecticut
