= Y90 =

Y90 may refer to:

- Yttrium-90 (Y-90 or ^{90}Y), an isotope of yttrium
- Yankee Terminal Radar Approach Control
