= Flying 20 Club =

American organization

- Official club logo
- Formation: June 22, 1940
- Location: Danbury Municipal Airport
- Website: flying20club.org

The Flying 20 Club is one of the oldest continuously active flying clubs in the United States. It is based at Danbury Municipal Airport in Danbury, Connecticut.

== History ==
The club was originally incorporated on June 22, 1940 by 20 members who each put up $20 toward the purchase of a Piper J-2 Cub. Since then, the club has owned several aircraft throughout its history from both Cessna and Piper, and currently owns two Piper Archers and one Piper Dakota. The number of members has ranged from the original 20 up to approximately 50.

On September 12, 2007, the club lost one of its planes due to a fire that destroyed the old Reliant Air hangar. Notable for being a part of history, the hangar was witness to the start of Charles Lindbergh's transatlantic flight. The club has since replaced the destroyed aircraft with a 2000 Piper Archer III.

== Current fleet ==
Flying 20 Club Fleet
Aircraft	Registration
Piper Archer II	N8237B
Piper Archer III	N455H
Piper Dakota	N8107B

== Special Events ==
On June 22, 2015, the club celebrated its 75th anniversary of continuous operation.

== Operations ==
Members are able to schedule any of the three current planes from an online reservation system with as little or as much advance as they desire. Prospective members may be given a demonstration flight by one of the current members at a reduced rate. All new members are voted on by the club members at the monthly meetings and must be given a checkout flight by one of the club-approved flight instructors. This ensures that everyone in the club is competent and proficient to fly, and helps maintain a trust among the club members.

All club aircraft are meticulously maintained, and during the summer months (generally May through September) a "Wash 'n Wax" event is held just prior to that month's meeting. This provides a social aspect to the club and allows members to meet each other while keeping the aircraft clean. In addition, many club members arrange "Fly-out" events with other members as a way to share their passion (and flight cost) with others.

In addition to daily reservations, each member is entitled to reserve a plane for an extended period of time. Specifically, one reservation per month for an entire weekend, one reservation per year during the summer months for up to 10 consecutive days and one reservation per year during non-summer months for up to 14 consecutive days.

As a result of popular discussion by the club members, a "Pinch Hitter" program was established to teach the members' significant others and flying partners how to fly, navigate, and land the aircraft should the pilot become incapacitated. The program includes both basic ground and flight instruction to the participants.
