= Danbury Municipal Airport =

Airport in Connecticut, United States of America

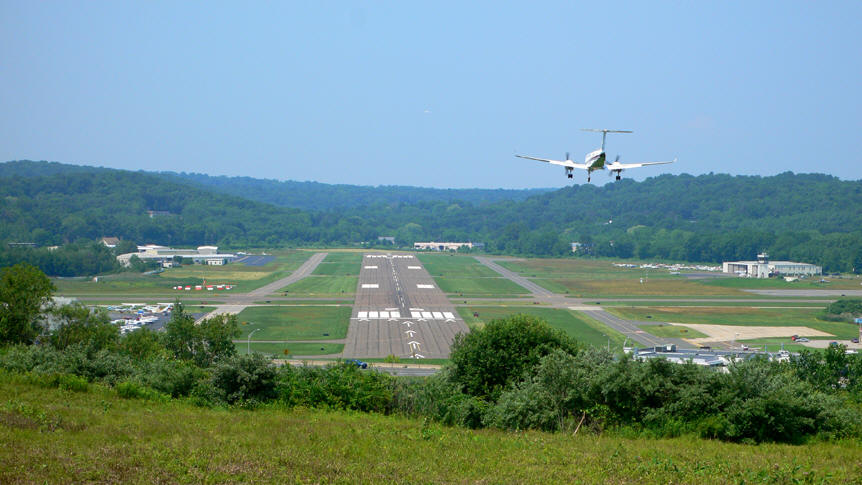
- IATA: DXR; ICAO: KDXR; FAA LID: DXR

Summary
- Airport type: Public
- Owner: City of Danbury
- Serves: Greater Danbury
- Location: Danbury, Connecticut
- Hub for: Reliant Air and Eagle Air
- Elevation AMSL: 458 ft (140 m)
- Coordinates: 41°22′18″N 073°28′56″W
- Website: DXR Website

Maps
- FAA airport diagram
- Interactive map of Danbury Municipal Airport

Runways
Direction	Length		Surface
Direction	ft	m	Surface
8/26	4,422	1,348	Asphalt
17/35	3,135	956	Asphalt

Statistics (2015)
- Aircraft operations: 61,270
- Based aircraft: 264
- Source: Federal Aviation Administration

Danbury Municipal Airport (IATA: DXR, ICAO: KDXR, FAA LID: DXR) is a public use general aviation and commercial airport located three miles (5 km) southwest of the central business district of Danbury, in Fairfield County, Connecticut, United States. The airport became operational in 1930 and has been administered by the City of Danbury, currently under the management of Michael Safranek. Additionally, the airport is included in the Federal Aviation Administration (FAA) National Plan of Integrated Airport Systems for 2017–2021, in which it is categorized as a regional reliever airport facility.

== History ==
In 1928, local pilots purchased a 60-acre tract near the Danbury Fair, which was then also known as Tucker's Field. This property was leased to the town in 1930 and became the Danbury Municipal Airport.

On the evening of September 12, 2007, the Reliant Air building was destroyed by fire. The hangar was located on the northeast side of the airport. However, the company's property has since been rebuilt, and Reliant Air continues its business activities.

In May 2025, the airport's administrator, Safranek, proposed to the Danbury City Council to officially rename Wallingford Road, where WestConn Aviation is located, to Sadler Way in remembrance of the Sadler family’s contributions to the airport.

== Facilities and aircraft ==
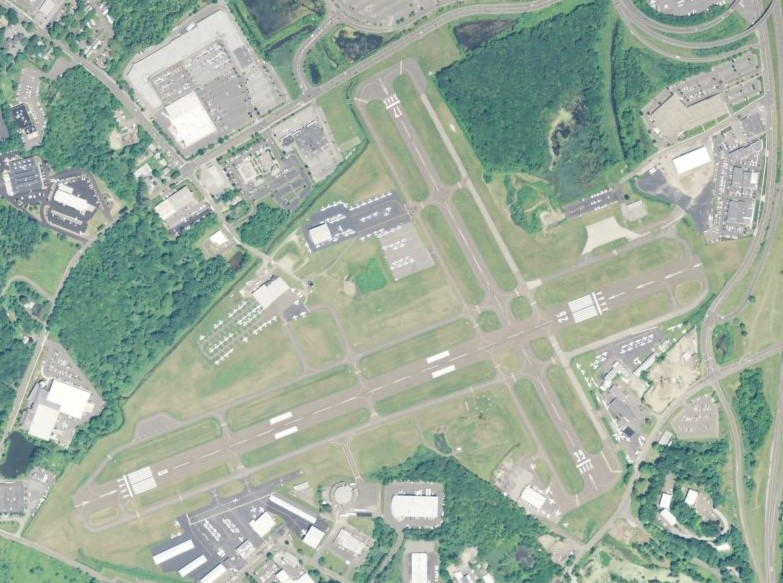
USGS 2006 orthophoto

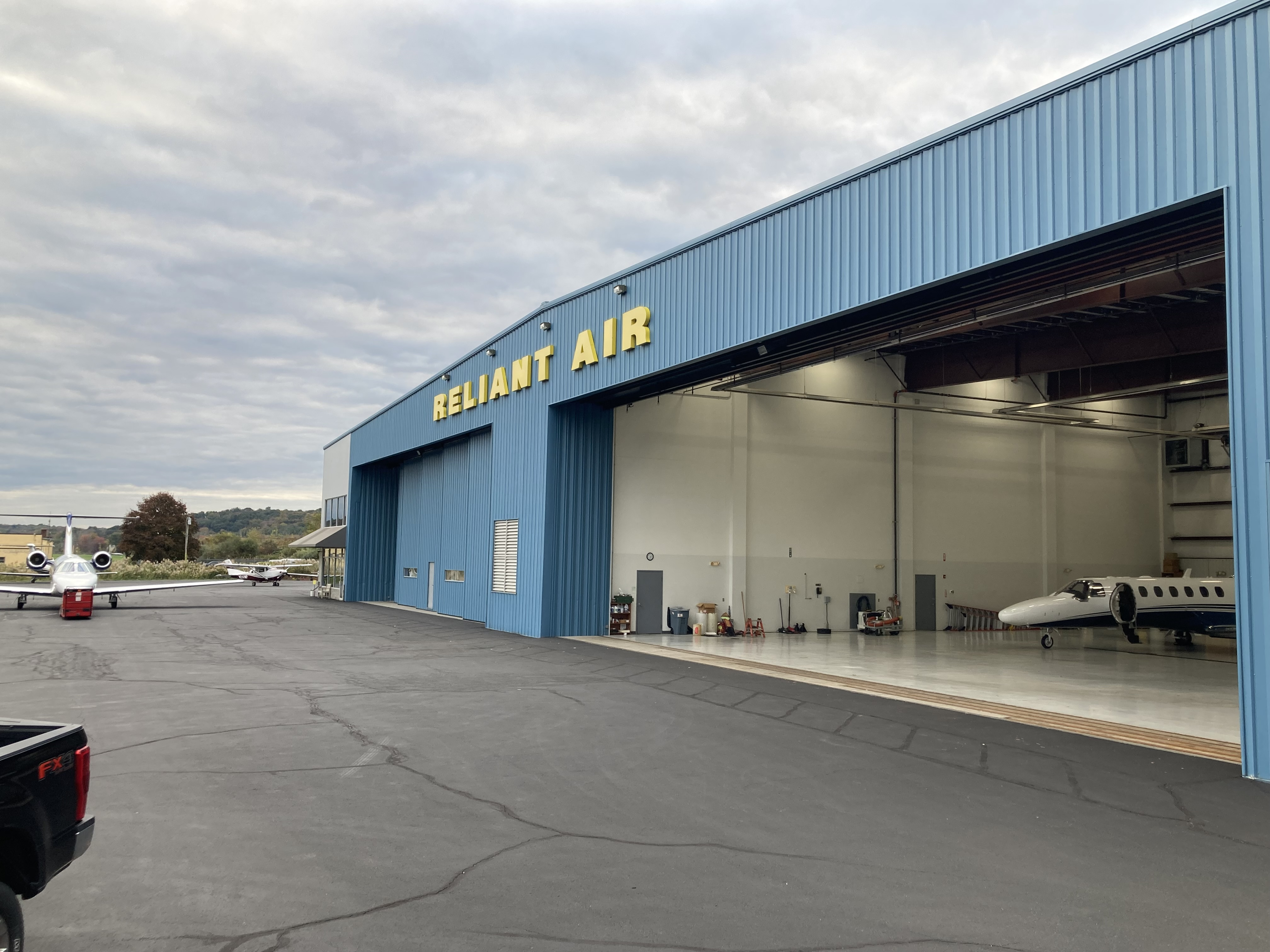
Reliant Air hangar at the airport

Danbury Municipal Airport covers 248 acres (1.00 km^{2}) and has two runways:

- Runway 8/26: 4,422 x 150 ft (1,348 x 46 m), surface: asphalt
- Runway 17/35: 3,135 x 100 ft (956 x 30 m), surface: asphalt

The airport has four instrument approaches:

- Localizer Runway 8: decision height - 643 feet (196 m) AGL
- RNAV (GPS)-A: MDA - 883 feet (269 m) AGL
- RNAV (GPS) Runway 8: MDA - 783 feet (239 m) AGL
- RNAV (GPS) Runway 26: MDA - 824 feet (251 m) AGL

On an annual basis, from January 1, 2021, to December 31, 2021, the airport registered 53,524 aircraft operations, averagely 147 per day: 43% local general aviation, 53% transient general aviation, 3% air taxi, and 1% military. There were 209 aircraft based at this airport: 169 single-engine, 23 multi-engine, 10 jet aircraft, and 7 helicopters.

Moreover, the Connecticut Wing Civil Air Patrol 399th Composite Squadron (NER-CT-042) operates out of the airport. The hangar is located next to runway 35.

== Airlines and destinations ==
=== Passenger ===
Airlines	Destinations
Reliant Air	Seasonal charter: Martha's Vineyard, Nantucket

== Accidents and incidents ==
- On October 16, 2011, a Cirrus SR22 crashed into a security beacon and then landed in a yard near the airport. The aircraft's one occupant was killed in the crash.
- On January 22, 2013, a Cirrus SR22 landed on South Street in Danbury. The Cirrus CAP System was deployed, and all three occupants were able to exit the aircraft without injuries.
- On August 21, 2015, an Eclipse 500 (N120EA) veered off Runway 26, causing minor injuries to the occupants and badly damaging the aircraft.
- On July 30, 2017, a Cessna 172 (N612DF) crashed in a dog park in Danbury shortly after taking off from Runway 26. Of the three passengers, two were injured, and one was killed in the crash.
- On September 22, 2017, a Cessna 180 (N9624B) experienced a ground loop, causing the plane to partially cartwheel, which severely damaged the engine and nose structure. The pilot experienced no injuries, and the plane was subsequently repaired.
- On June 4, 2026, a Beechcraft Bonanza (N726EA) attempting to take off from Runway 35 crashed into fencing at the end of the runway. The aircraft was damaged but the pilot was uninjured.

== See also ==
- Flying 20 Club, one of the oldest continuously active flying clubs
- List of airports in Connecticut
