= Robertson Field (Connecticut) =

Airport in Hartford County, Connecticut, USA

Robertson Airport Robertson Field
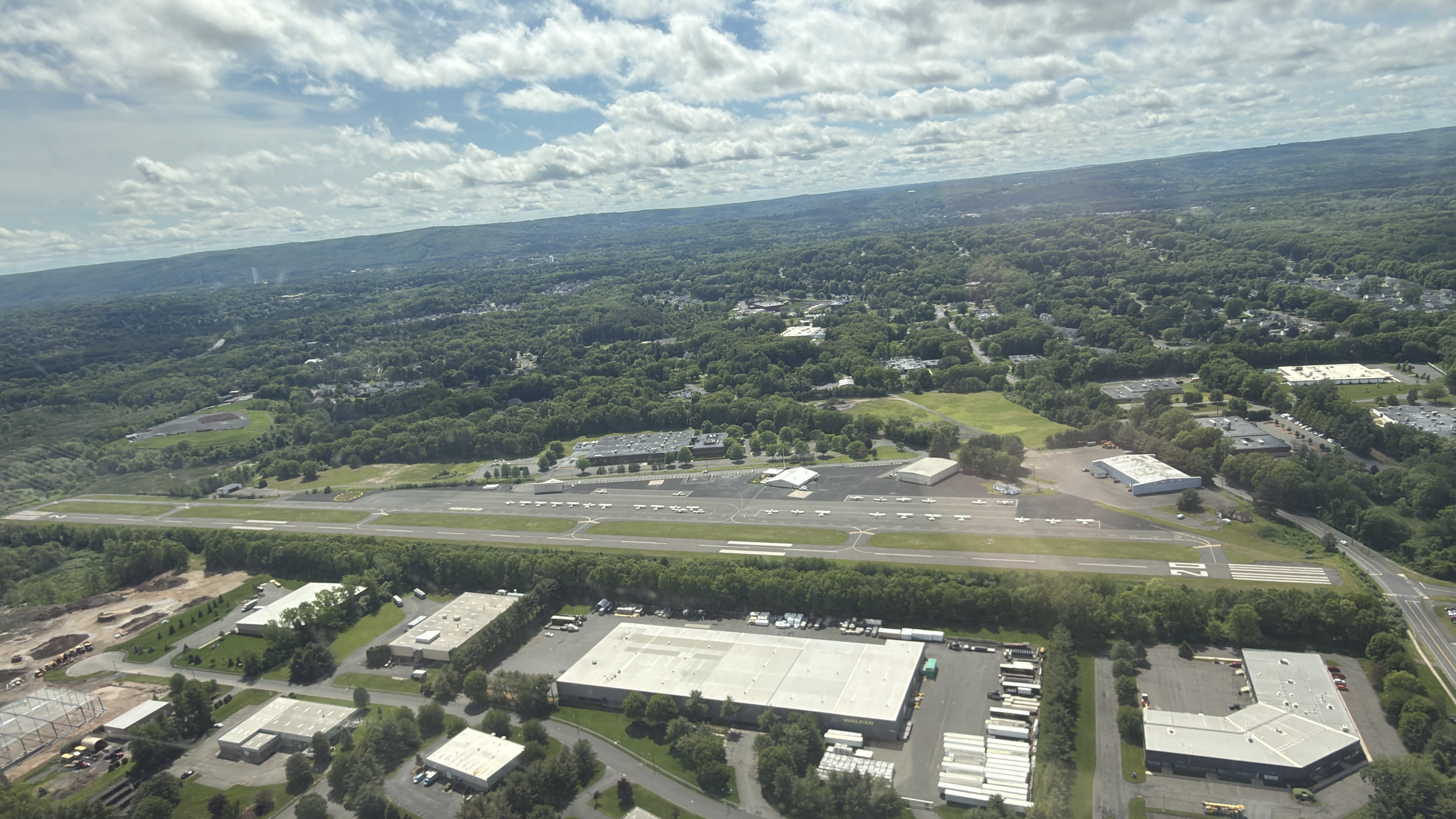
- Robertson Airport in 2026
- IATA: none; ICAO: none; FAA LID: 4B8

Summary
- Airport type: Public
- Owner: Town of Plainville
- Serves: Plainville, Connecticut
- Elevation AMSL: 202 ft / 62 m
- Coordinates: 41°41′22″N 072°51′53″W
- Website: www.plainvillect.com/airport

Map
- Interactive map of Robertson Airport

Runways
Direction	Length		Surface
Direction	ft	m	Surface
2/20	3,665	1,117	Asphalt

Helipads
Number	Length		Surface
Number	ft	m	Surface
H1	30	9	Asphalt

Statistics (2011)
- Aircraft operations: 21,105
- Based aircraft: 110
- Source: Federal Aviation Administration

Robertson Airport (FAA LID: 4B8), also known as Robertson Field, is a public use airport in Hartford County, Connecticut, United States. It is owned by the town of Plainville and is located two nautical miles (4 km) north of its central business district. It is included in the Federal Aviation Administration (FAA) National Plan of Integrated Airport Systems for 2017–2021, in which it is categorized as a local reliever airport facility.

It is primarily used for general aviation, charter flights, and flight training.

== History ==
Opened in 1911, Robertson Field is the oldest airport in Connecticut. John H. Trumbull, a Plainville native and Connecticut's Governor from 1925 to 1931, is known to have used the airfield. He was dubbed "The Flying Governor". In 1990 the Tomasso family completed renovation and expansion of the 3,600-foot (1,100 m) runway.

The Town of Plainville had explored a purchase of the airport beginning in 1995. It was appraised by Tomasso at $6.5 million, double its tax assessment by the town. In July 2007, the town received a $116,850 federal grant to further study buying the airport. Tomasso Brothers, Inc, hired New Britain based firm Gaffney Bennet Public Relations to create an astroturf campaign with the aim of pressuring town officials to purchase the airport. The campaign involved "brochures, mailers, newspaper op-eds and advertisements” and was eventually successful. The Town of Plainville purchased the airport from Tomasso Brothers, Inc. for $7.7 million USD on December 30, 2009.

In December 2012, the runway was repaved and the airport received several upgrades. One of them being the addition of different and updated pilot-controlled lighting along with precision markings on the runway for an instrument approach procedure the airport received in April 2015.

== Facilities and aircraft ==
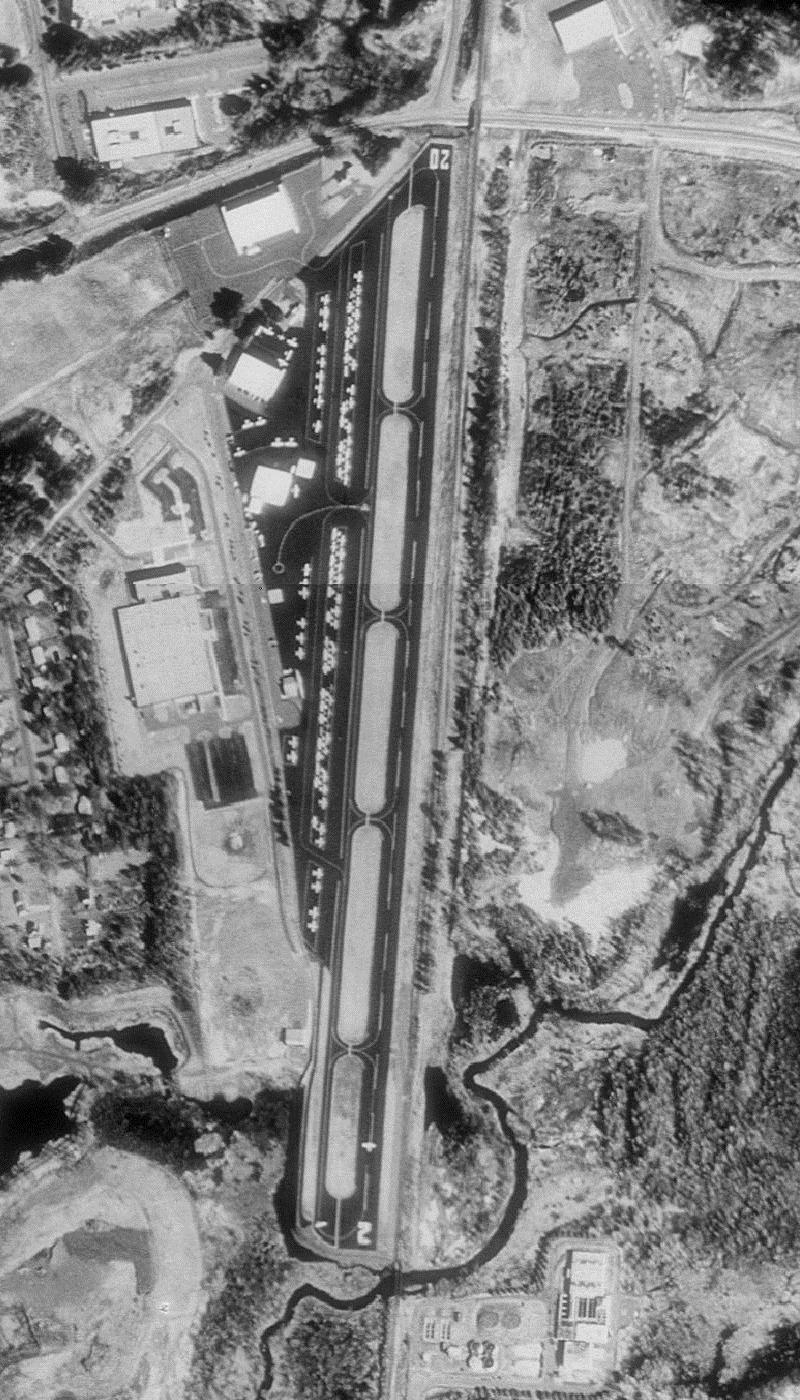
USGS 1991 orthophoto

Robertson Field covers an area of 39 acres (16 ha) at an elevation of 202 feet (62 m) above mean sea level. It has one runway designated 2/20 with an asphalt surface measuring 3,665 by 75 feet (1,117 x 23 m). It also has one helipad designated H1 with an asphalt surface measuring 30 by 30 feet (9 x 9 m).

For the 12-month period ending May 31, 2011, the airport had 21,105 aircraft operations, an average of 57 per day: 97% general aviation, 3% air taxi, and <1% military.

At that time there were 110 aircraft based at this airport: 94% single-engine and 6% multi-engine.

The Connecticut Wing Civil Air Patrol 186th Composite Squadron (NER-CT-058) operates out of the airport.

== Accidents and incidents ==
Just before 10 a.m. on September 2, 2021, a Cessna Citation 560XLS+ with four people on board crashed into a warehouse after takeoff. All on board were killed, and two people were injured in a building the aircraft impacted. The cause of the crash has been determined to be the parking brake not being released prior to takeoff, likely the result of pilot error.

== See also ==
- List of airports in Connecticut
