= 1949 Port Washington mid-air collision =

1949 mid-air collision over Port Washington, New York, United States

Pan Am Flight 100
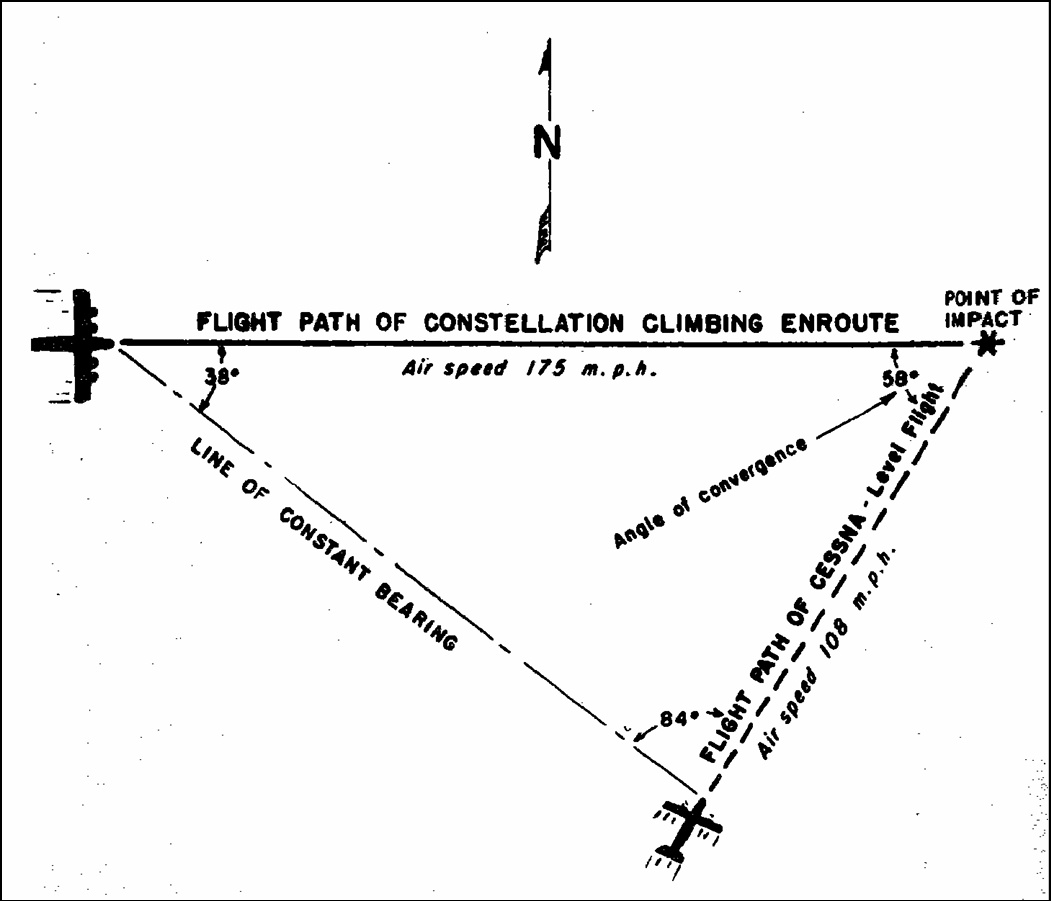
- Diagram of the collision showing the flight path, airspeed, and point of impact from both aircraft

Accident
- Date: 30 January 1949
- Summary: Mid-air collision
- Site: Port Washington, North Hempstead, United States; 40°49′44″N 73°41′12″W
- Total fatalities: 2
- Total survivors: 33

First aircraft
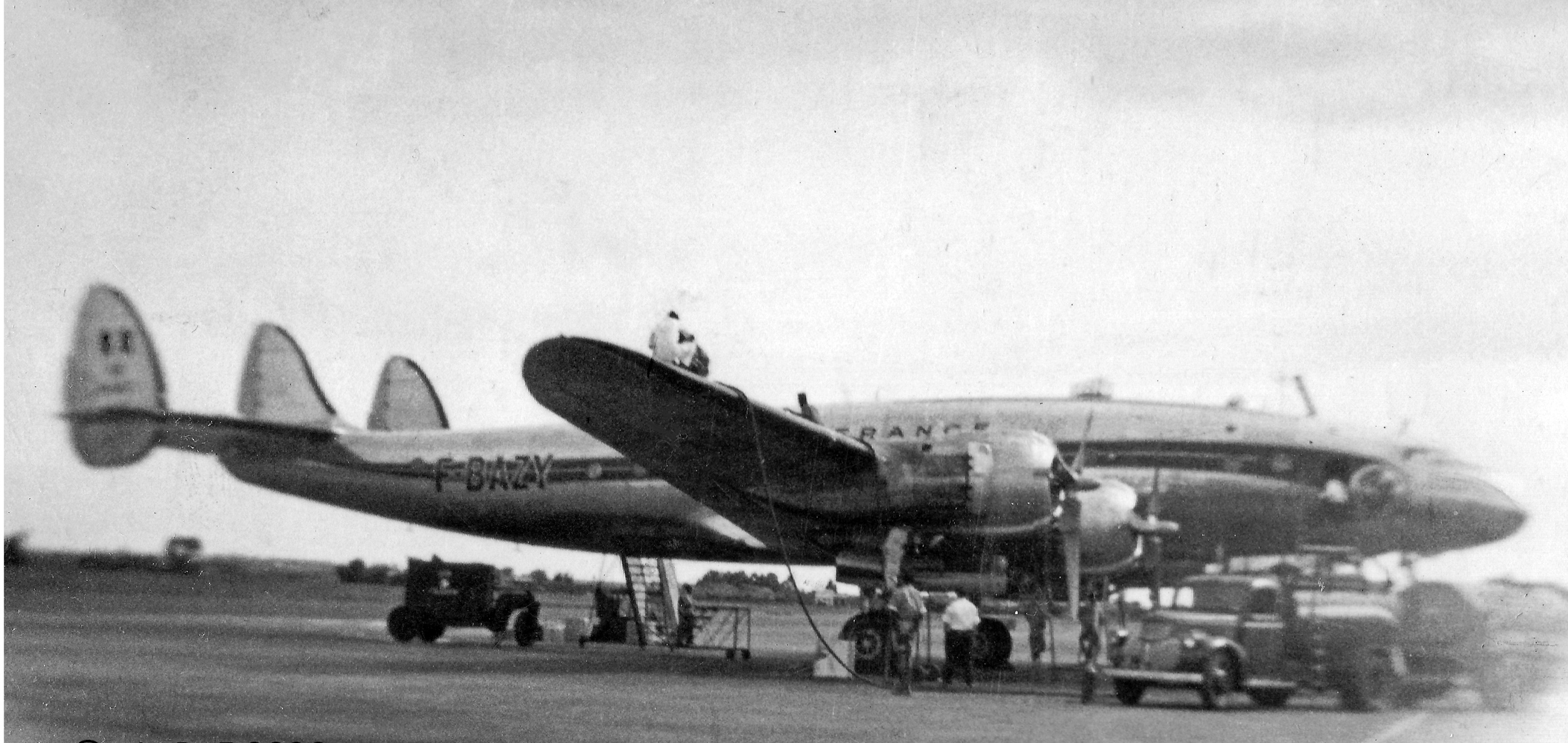
- The Lockheed L-749A Constellation involved in the collision, now in service with Air France in 1955
- Type: Lockheed L-749A Constellation
- Name: Clipper Monarch of the Skies
- Operator: Pan American World Airways
- IATA flight No.: PA100
- ICAO flight No.: PAA100
- Call sign: CLIPPER 100
- Registration: NC86530
- Flight origin: LaGuardia Airport, East Elmhurst, United States
- Destination: Shannon Airport, Shannon, Ireland
- Occupants: 33
- Passengers: 23
- Crew: 10
- Fatalities: 0
- Survivors: 33

Second aircraft
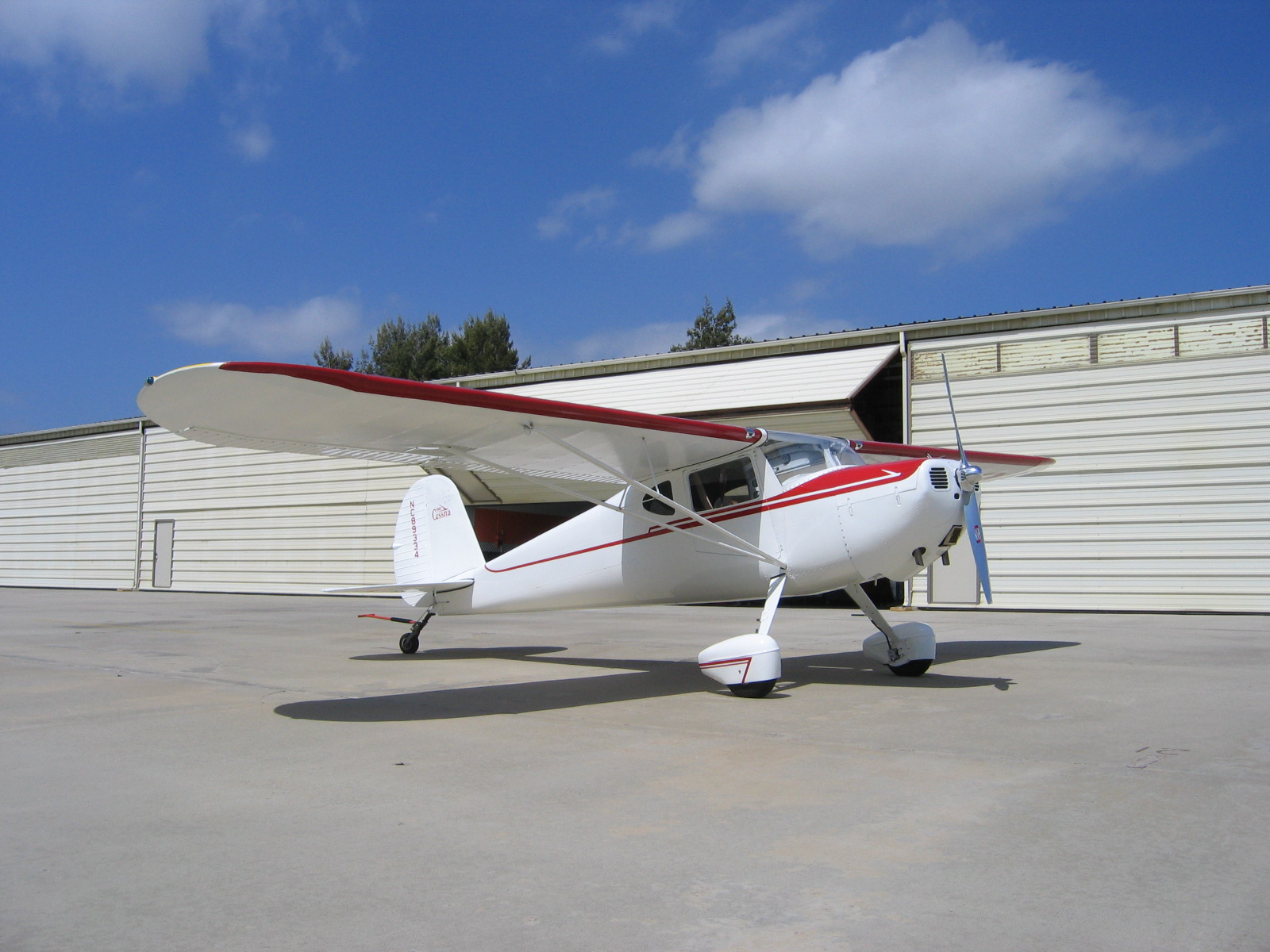
- A Cessna 140, similar to the one involved in the collision
- Type: Cessna 140
- Operator: Private
- Registration: NC76891
- Flight origin: Meriden Airport, (Note: Now known as Meriden Markham Municipal Airport.) Meriden, United States
- Destination: Meriden Airport, Meriden, United States
- Occupants: 2
- Passengers: 1
- Crew: 1
- Fatalities: 2
- Survivors: 0

On the afternoon of January 30, 1949, a mid-air collision occurred over downtown Port Washington, New York – a suburban community on the Cow Neck Peninsula of Long Island.

Known as the 1949 Port Washington mid-air collision, the accident occurred when Pan Am Flight 100 – a scheduled passenger flight to Shannon Airport in Ireland from LaGuardia Airport in New York City, operated by Pan American World Airways using a Lockheed L-749A Constellation – collided in mid-air with a private Cessna 140.

== Description ==
=== Flights ===
Pan Am Flight 100 was en route to Shannon from LaGuardia Airport. The Cessna 140 was on a local flight from Meriden Airport in Meriden, Connecticut.

=== Accident ===
The Constellation sustained substantial damage but landed without casualties at Mitchel Air Force Base in the East Garden City section of nearby Uniondale, New York. The Cessna crashed, resulting in the death of the pilot and the sole passenger. Debris rained down upon large swaths of Port Washington – primarily within the Beacon Hill neighborhood and in the vicinity of North Maryland Avenue, North Bayles Avenue, and Herbert Avenue.

=== Investigation and aftermath ===
The Civil Aeronautics Board attributed the collision to the failure of both pilots to observe and avoid each other.

== Passengers and crew ==
The pilot in command of the Constellation was George F. Knuth, who was later killed in 1963 while serving as the captain of Pan Am Flight 214. Notable passengers aboard the Pan Am flight included English theatrical producer Harold Fielding and Laszlo Halasz, director of the New York City Opera.

== See also ==
- List of mid-air collisions
- 1960 New York mid-air collision
