= Connecticut Valley Hospital =

- State of Connecticut Department of Mental Health and Addiction Services
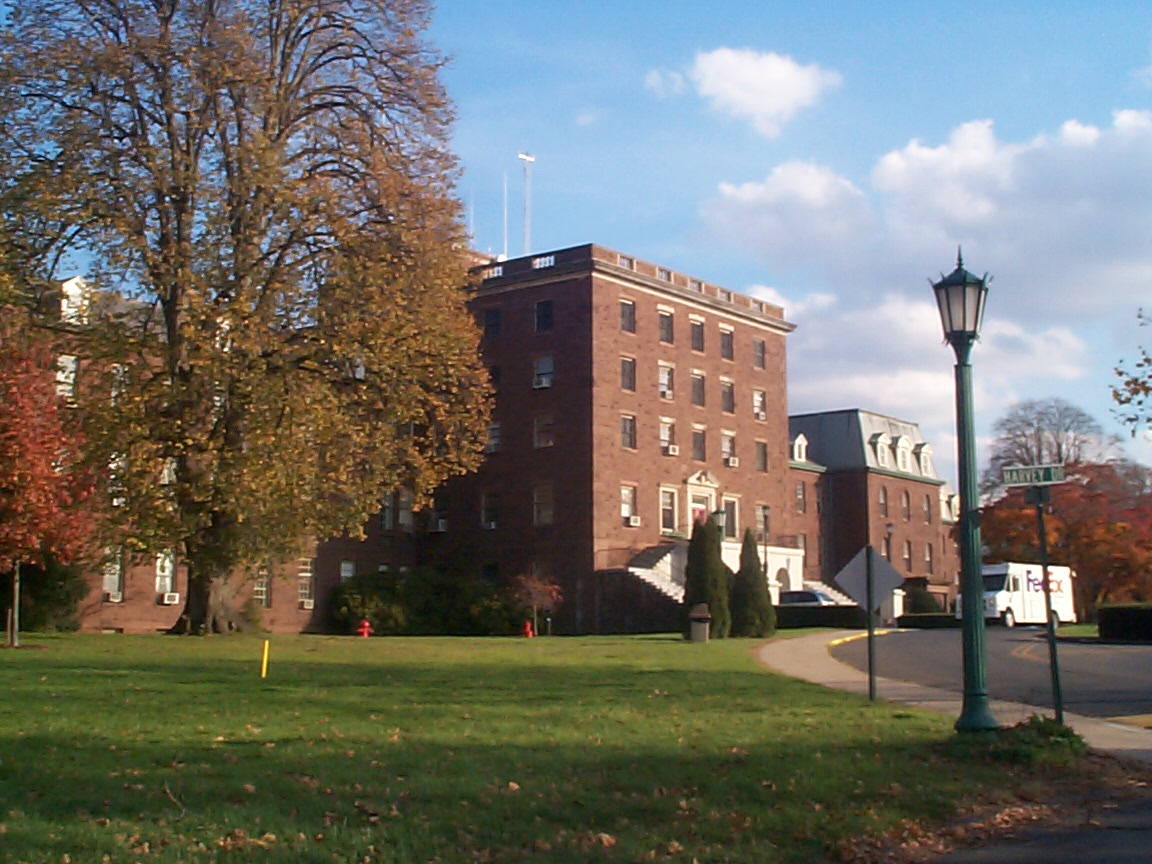
- Shew Hall, first building of the hospital constructed in 1867

Geography
- Location: Middletown, Connecticut, United States

Organization
- Type: Specialist

Services
- Speciality: Psychiatric hospital

History
- Opened: 1868

Links
- Website: portal.ct.gov/dmhas/cvh
- Lists: Hospitals in Connecticut
- Connecticut General Hospital for the Insane
- U.S. National Register of Historic Places
- Location: Silver Street East of Eastern Drive Middletown, Connecticut
- Coordinates: 41.55°N 72.63°W
- Area: 100 acres (40 ha)
- Architect: Multiple
- Architectural style: Late 19th and 20th Century Revivals and Late Victorian
- NRHP reference No.: 85001920
- Added to NRHP: August 29, 1985

Connecticut Valley Hospital in Middletown, Connecticut, is a public hospital operated by the state of Connecticut to treat people with mental illness. It was historically known as Connecticut General Hospital for the Insane. It is a 100-acre (40 ha) historic district that was listed on the National Register of Historic Places in 1985.

The historic district includes late 19th and 20th century revival and late Victorian architecture. When listed on the National Register, the district included 27 contributing buildings. Also included were 25 non-contributing buildings.

== History ==
The Connecticut Hospital for the Insane was formally opened in Middletown in 1868. Two years earlier, Middletown had granted the site to the State for the establishment of an asylum to accommodate Connecticut's mentally ill. By 1896, four groups of buildings had been erected and the institution was one of the largest of its kind in the country. Connecticut Valley Hospital Cemetery was established in 1878.

The site is still used as a psychiatric care facility, operated by the Department of Mental Health and Addiction Services. The State has indicated that it wishes to demolish up to 24 buildings on the campus.

== Facilities ==
Located in South Farms district, Connecticut Valley Hospital consists of a large concentration of early and contemporary buildings. The site, landscaped with broad lawns and large shade trees, is at the top of a hill and offers panoramic views of the city. Silver Street and Bow Lane pass through the property which is bordered by Eastern Drive, to the west. Small drives, leading from these streets, traverse the property's grounds.

The hospital consists of approximately eighty structures complemented by 650 acres (2.6 km^{2}) south and east of the main site. It includes large institutional buildings constructed of brick and brownstone, frame and brick residences, and a number of maintenance buildings. The majority of these form a large group centered on Shew Hall. This site contains approximately 200 acres. It comprises many distinctive structures that evidence different periods of the institution's development.

Shew Hall, the original hospital structure, was built in 1867. It functions as the administrative building and is the focal point of the institution. This large structure is named in honor of the hospital's first superintendent, Dr. Abram M. Shew. Designed by Addison Hutton of Philadelphia, it was constructed in the Second Empire style. The building was remodeled in 1939, when the interior was updated and a flat roof bordered by a parapet was installed on the main section. The three large wings display mansard roofs and details that are indicative of the main section's former appearance.

Stanley Hall, built around 1879, was also designed in the Second Empire style. It was the hospital's maximum security facility in prior years. Stanley Hall was dismantled and removed some time after 1999.

Woodward Hall, erected around 1886, is in the Queen Anne style. It has an irregular profile that is accentuated by many ells. The structure exhibits multiple roofs capped by numerous chimneys, wide turrets, and large, gabled dormers. The interior has been recently remodeled. The Queen Anne style section of Woodward Hall was torn down in 2007, and there are tentative plans to develop a garden where it once stood. The "newer" section of Woodward Hall (built in the early 20th century at the same time Weeks Hall was built) still stands and houses the geriatric wards.

Weeks Hall, built in 1896, was also constructed in the Queen Anne and, in addition, had features that suggested the influence of the Jacobethan Revival. Its appearance, similar to that of Woodward Hall, was highlighted by prominent, steeply pitched gables and floral designs in terra cotta. The interior sections and roofs of the western side of Weeks Hall collapsed in the 21st century, but the exterior walls remained standing until the structure burned on September 21, 2010.

Smith Home, constructed about 1909, is designed in the Colonial Revival style. It has a cross-gabled roof crowned by a slender, distinctive tower. The main entrance displays fluted pilasters and a large fan in relief above the door. Currently unoccupied, the structure once housed hospital employees.

Other notable early buildings are located on the grounds. The police station, a distinctive cottage, was erected in 1895. Shepherd Home and Russell Hall are two similar structures that were built in the 1920s; they exhibit large, ornate porticoes which are classical in design. There are also a number of small residences, constructed during the late nineteenth century, that have served as living quarters for the staff. Smith Home and Shepard Home once provided housing for nursing staff. Russell Hall once was used as the on-campus medical hospital.

This site reflects the history associated with the care and treatment of the mentally ill in Connecticut. The buildings, reminiscent of different eras of the hospital's past, document its progressive growth and comprise a diverse collection that contributes to the architectural variety of Middletown.

The Connecticut Wing Civil Air Patrol Wing Headquarters (NER-CT-001) is located in Beers Hall.

== Notable patients ==
- Amy Archer-Gilligan - serial killer

== See also ==
- Connecticut Valley Hospital Cemetery
- National Register of Historic Places listings in Middletown, Connecticut
