= Salmon River Airfield =

American airport in Connecticut

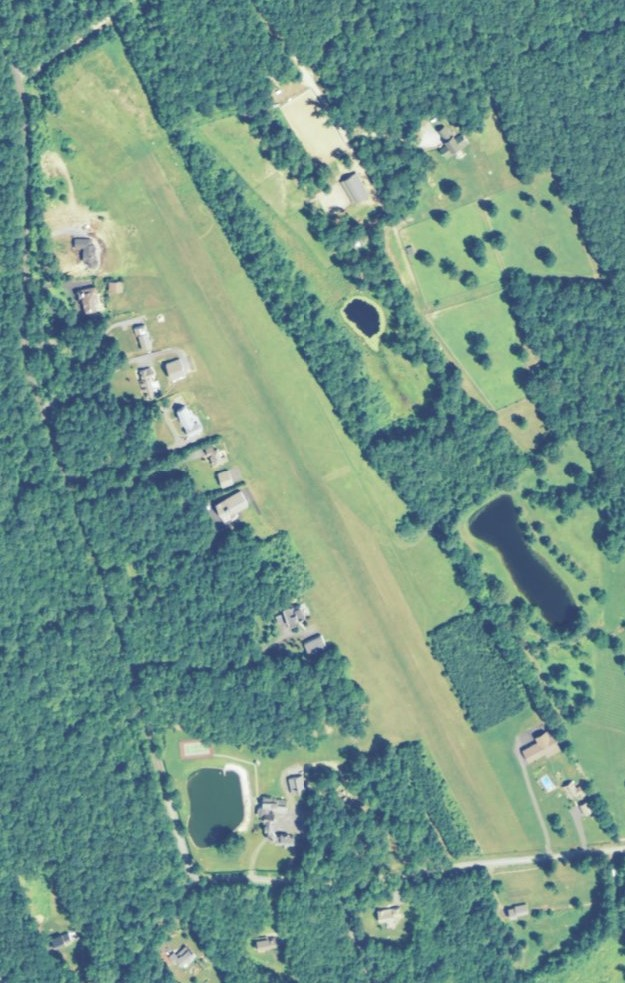
- USGS 2006 orthophoto
- IATA: none; ICAO: none; FAA LID: 9B8

Summary
- Airport type: Public
- Owner: Salmon River Airfield Associated
- Operator: Sandy Brown
- Serves: Colchester
- Location: Connecticut
- Elevation AMSL: 540 ft (160 m)
- Coordinates: 41°35′22″N 72°26′32″W

Map
- Interactive map of Salmon River Airfield

Runways
Direction	Length		Surface
Direction	ft	m	Surface
17/35	2,000	610	Turf

Statistics (2008)
- Aircraft operations: 804
- Based aircraft: 8
- Source: Federal Aviation Administration

Salmon River Airfield (FAA LID: 9B8) is an American airport located in Colchester, Connecticut, United States.

== Facilities and aircraft ==
Salmon River Airfield is situated 3 miles south of the central business district, and contains one runway. The runway, 17/35, is turf measuring 2,000 x 60 ft (610 x 18 m).

For the 12-month period ending July 1, 2008, the airport had 804 aircraft operations, an average of 67 per month: 62% local general aviation, and 38% transient general aviation. At that time there were 8 aircraft based at this airport: 87% single-engine and 13% helicopter.

== See also ==
- List of airports in Connecticut
