= List of airports in Connecticut =

This is a list of airports in Connecticut, grouped by type and sorted by location. It contains all public-use and military airports in the state. Some privately owned and former airports may be included where notable, such as airports that were previously public-use, those with commercial enplanements recorded by the FAA or airports assigned an IATA airport code.

== Airports ==
This list contains the following information:

- **City served** – The city generally associated with the airport, as per the airport's master record with the Federal Aviation Administration. This is not always the actual location since some airports are located in smaller towns outside of the city they serve. It is not meant to be a complete list of cities served, which can be found in or added to each airport's Wikipedia article.
- **FAA** – The location identifier assigned by the Federal Aviation Administration (FAA).
- **IATA** – The airport code assigned by the International Air Transport Association (IATA). Those that do not match the FAA code are shown in bold.
- **ICAO** – The location indicator assigned by the International Civil Aviation Organization (ICAO).
- **Airport name** – The official airport name. Those shown in **bold** indicate the airport has scheduled passenger service on commercial airlines.
- **Role** – One of four FAA airport categories, as per the 2025–2029 National Plan of Integrated Airport Systems (NPIAS) report released October 2024:
  - P-s: Commercial service – primary are publicly owned airports that receive scheduled passenger service and have more than 10,000 passenger boardings (enplanements) each year. Each primary airport is sub-classified by the FAA as one of the following four "hub" types (s):
    - L: Large hub that accounts for at least 1% of total U.S. passenger enplanements.
    - M: Medium hub that accounts for between 0.25% and 1% of total U.S. passenger enplanements.
    - S: Small hub that accounts for between 0.05% and 0.25% of total U.S. passenger enplanements.
    - N: Nonhub that accounts for less than 0.05% of total U.S. passenger enplanements, but more than 10,000 annual enplanements.
  - CS: Commercial service – nonprimary are publicly owned airports that receive scheduled passenger service and have at least 2,500 passenger boardings each year.
  - R: Reliever airports are designated by the FAA to relieve congestion at a large commercial service airport and to provide more general aviation access to the overall community.
  - GA: General aviation airports are the largest single group of airports in the U.S. airport system. They are public-use airports that do not have scheduled service or have scheduled service with less than 2,500 passenger boardings each year.
- **Enplanements** – The number of enplanements (commercial passenger boardings) that occurred at the airport in calendar year 2024, as per FAA records released 2025.

City served	FAA	IATA	ICAO	Airport name	Role	Enplanements (2024)
				**Commercial service – primary airports**		
Hartford	BDL	BDL	KBDL	**Bradley International Airport**	P-M	3,285,194
New Haven	HVN	HVN	KHVN	**Tweed-New Haven Airport**	P-S	589,409
				**Reliever airports**		
Danbury	DXR	DXR	KDXR	Danbury Municipal Airport	R	82
Hartford	HFD	HFD	KHFD	Hartford–Brainard Airport	R	48
Plainville	4B8			Robertson Field	R	30
				**General aviation airports**		
Bridgeport	BDR	BDR	KBDR	Igor I. Sikorsky Memorial Airport	GA	487
Danielson	LZD		KLZD	Danielson Airport	GA	8
Groton / New London	GON	GON	KGON	Groton–New London Airport	GA	133
Meriden	MMK		KMMK	Meriden Markham Municipal Airport	GA	1
Oxford	OXC	OXC	KOXC	Waterbury–Oxford Airport	GA	186
Willimantic	IJD		KIJD	Windham Airport	GA	7
				**Other public-use airports** (not listed in NPIAS)		
Chester	SNC		KSNC	Chester Airport		4
East Haddam	42B			Goodspeed Airport		
Ellington	7B9			Ellington Airport		
Marlborough	9B8			Salmon River Airfield		
New Milford	11N			Candlelight Farms Airport		
Putnam	C44			Toutant Airport		
Simsbury	4B9			Simsbury Airport (Simsbury Tri-Town Airport)		
Warehouse Point	7B6			Skylark Airpark		
Waterbury	N41			Waterbury Airport		
				**Notable private-use airports**		
Bethlehem	CT01			Whelan Farms Airport		
Bethlehem	5CT5			Thomson Field Airport		
Bethlehem	33CT			Irish Hills Farm Airport		
Bozrah	CT36			Gager Field Airport		
Bristol	CT96			Green Acres Airport		
Colchester	CT08			Gardner Lake Airport		
Colchester	CT07			Ski's Landing Area Airport		
Coventry	CT09			Heckler Field Airport		
Durham	CT39			Maplewood Farm Airport		
East Haddam	CT11			Devils Hopyard Field Airport		
East Windsor	CT85			Roberts Farm Airport		
Ellington	CT15			Wysocki Field Airport		
Enfield	CT19			Laurie Field Airport		
Goshen	CT42			Wings Ago Airstrip		
Griswold	CT43			Spruce Airport		
Jewett City	24CT			Bee Field Airport		
Marlborough	CT20			Rankl Field Airport		
Newtown	CT52			Flying Ridge Airstrip		
North Canaan	CT24			North Canaan Airport		
North Stonington	CT48			Wychwood Field Airport		
Old Lyme	5CT7			Mile Creek Airport		
Roxbury	CT59			Good Hill Farm Airport		
South Windsor	CT14			Bancroft Airport		
Stonington	CT80			Stonington Airpark		
Voluntown	CT32			Gallup Farm Airport		
Washington	CT66			Cambrown Airport		
Westford	CT74			Westford Airstrip		
Woodstock	64CT			Woodstock Airport		
				**Notable former airports**		
Ansonia				Ansonia Airport (closed 1988-89, now suburban housing)		
Bethany				Bethany Airport (closed 1966, now town land)		
Bristol				Stephenson Field, later Bristol Airport (closed 1955-58, now ESPN HQ)		
East Hartford	~~EHT~~			Rentschler Field (closed 1993-97, now stadium, retail)		
Essex				Doane Airport, later Essex Airport (closed 1955-56, still undeveloped)		
Hamden				Hamden Airport (closed 1936, now industrial park)		
Madison	~~N04~~			Griswold Airport (closed 2007, now municipal athletic fields)		
Monroe				Monroe Airport (closed 1973-79, now cemeteries)		
Norwalk				Norwalk Airport (closed 1940-41, now parochial school)		
Pachaug	~~5B4~~			Pachaug Airport, later Lakeside Airport (closed 1993, now industrial park)		
Salem				Salem Airport (closed 1951-1960, still undeveloped)		
Stafford Springs	~~CT31~~			Swift Airfield (closed by 2016)		
Waterford				New London–Waterford Airport (closed 1988, still undeveloped)		
West Haven				H & H Airport, later West Haven Airport (closed 1950, now suburban housing, elementary school)		

== See also ==
- Connecticut World War II Army Airfields
- Aviation in the New York metropolitan area
