= Connecticut Valley Hospital Cemetery =

Historic cemetery in Connecticut, US

- U.S. National Register of Historic Places
- U.S. Historic district
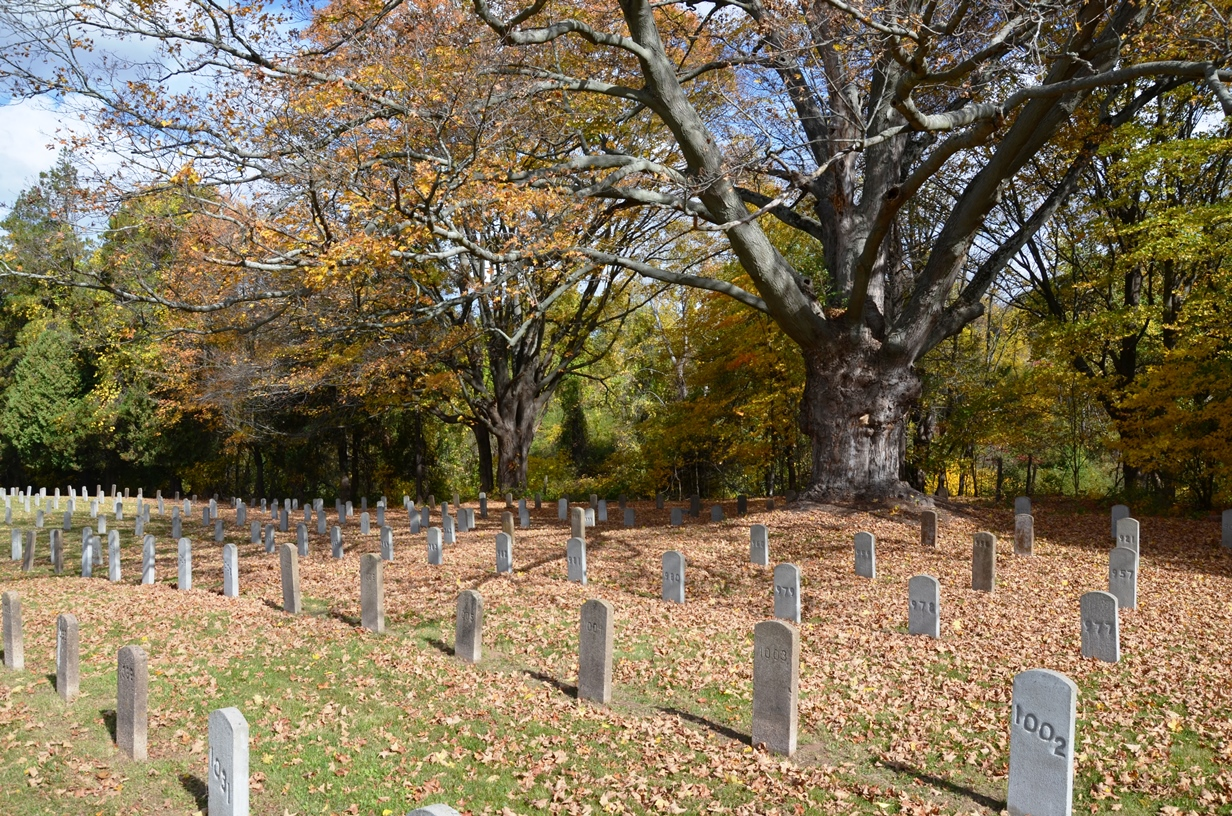

- Location within Connecticut Location within the United States
- Location: South of Junction of Silvermine Road & O'Brien Drive Middletown, Connecticut
- Coordinates: 41°33′12″N 72°37′11″W
- Area: 2.8 acres (1.1 ha)
- NRHP reference No.: 100002718
- Added to NRHP: August 2, 2018

The Connecticut Valley Hospital Cemetery is a historic cemetery on Silvermine Road in Middletown, Connecticut. Founded in 1878, it served as the burying ground for patients of the Connecticut General Hospital for the Insane until 1957. Its design and layout are reflective of institutional cemetery practices of the period, with uniform numbered grave markers in a modestly landscaped setting. The cemetery was listed on the National Register of Historic Places in 1982.

== Description and history ==
The Connecticut Valley Hospital Cemetery is located in a rural setting of southern Middletown, on the east side of Silvermine Road south of its junction with O'Brien Drive. It is visually separated from the campus of the Connecticut Valley Hospital, originally known as the Connecticut General Hospital for the Insane, which is located to its northwest. The cemetery is under 3 acres (1.2 ha) in size and roughly rectangular in shape, except for its oldest section, a roughly trapezoidal parcel on the west side of Silvermine Road. Graves are arrayed in lines parallel to the road, with generally uniform markers of cast cement, identifying the site solely by number. A set of four granite plaques, placed in a cluster near the road, memorialize the site and provide an index for identifying the buried individuals.

The Connecticut General Hospital for the Insane was established by the state in 1868, as a place for the housing and treatment of its indigent mentally ill. While patients from well-to-do families were typically buried at family expense in private or public cemeteries, the indigent were buried at state expense in this cemetery. Its first recorded burial was in 1878, on the parcel west of Silvermine Road. A total of 1699 burials were recorded through the time of the cemetery's closure in 1957. It is believed to be the only state medical facility in Connecticut with an associated cemetery.

== See also ==
- National Register of Historic Places listings in Middletown, Connecticut
