= Candlelight Farms Airport =

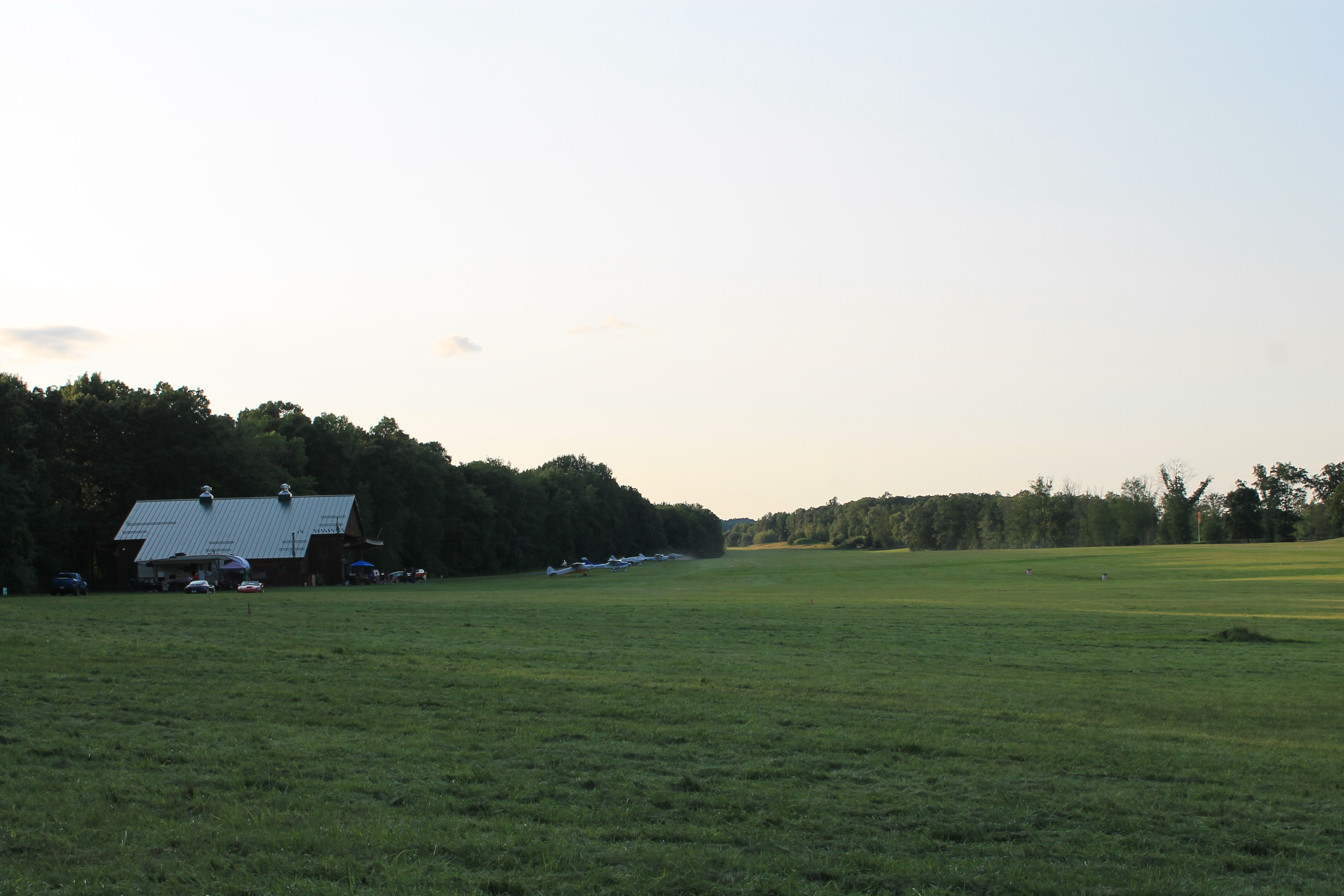
- IATA: none; ICAO: none; FAA LID: 11N

Summary
- Airport type: Public
- Owner: Candlelight Farms Airport LLC
- Operator: Candlelight Farms Airport LLC
- Serves: New Milford
- Location: Connecticut
- Elevation AMSL: 675 ft (206 m)
- Coordinates: 41°34′09″N 73°27′43″W

Map
- Interactive map of Candlelight Farms Airport

Runways
Direction	Length		Surface
Direction	ft	m	Surface
17/35	2,900	884	Turf

Statistics (2010)
- Aircraft operations: 10,950
- Based aircraft: 14
- Source: Federal Aviation Administration

Candlelight Farms Airport (FAA LID: 11N) is a privately owned, public-use airfield located in New Milford, Connecticut, United States.

== Facilities and aircraft ==
Candlelight Farms Airport is situated 3 miles southwest of the central business district, and contains one runway and helipad. The runway is turf measuring 2,900 x 50 ft (884 x 15 m).

For the 12-month period ending April 30, 2010, the airport had 10,950 aircraft operations, an average of 30 per day: 86% local general aviation, and 14% transient general aviation. At that time there were 14 aircraft based at this airport: 100% single-engine.

== Accidents and incidents ==
- On the morning of August 11, 2017, a Cessna 172 carrying a pilot and two passengers crashed, killing one person.

== See also ==
- List of airports in Connecticut
