= Waterbury Airport (Connecticut) =

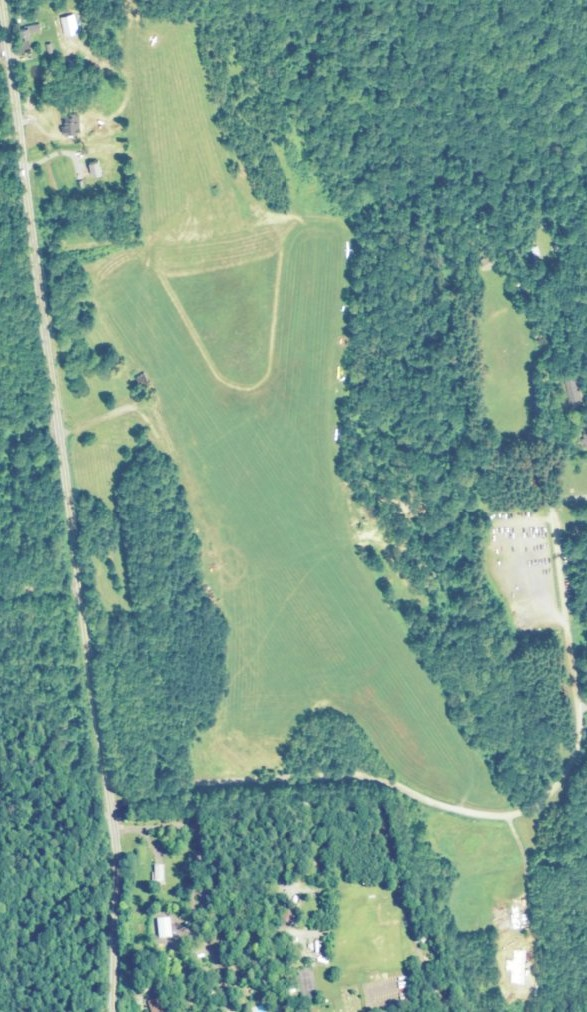
- USGS 2006 orthophoto
- IATA: none; ICAO: none; FAA LID: N41

Summary
- Airport type: Public
- Owner: Kilcourse & Seymour
- Operator: Ken Kilcourse
- Serves: Waterbury
- Location: Connecticut
- Elevation AMSL: 850 ft (260 m)
- Coordinates: 41°38′00″N 73°02′48″W

Map
- Interactive map of Waterbury Airport

Runways
Direction	Length		Surface
Direction	ft	m	Surface
17/35	2,005	611	Turf
02/20	1,600	488	Turf

Statistics (2007)
- Aircraft operations: 15,695
- Based aircraft: 14
- Source: Federal Aviation Administration

Waterbury Airport (FAA LID: N41), is located in Plymouth, Connecticut, United States.

== Facilities and aircraft ==
Waterbury Airport is situated four miles north of the central business district, and contains two runways. The longer runway, 17/35, is turf measuring 2,005 x 135 ft (611 x 41 m).

For the 12-month period ending December 31, 2007, the airport had 15,695 aircraft operations, an average of 43 per day: 99% local general aviation, and <1% transient general aviation. At that time there were 14 aircraft based at this airport: 71% single-engine, 14% glider airplanes, and 14% ultralight.

== See also ==
- List of airports in Connecticut
