= Skylark Airpark =

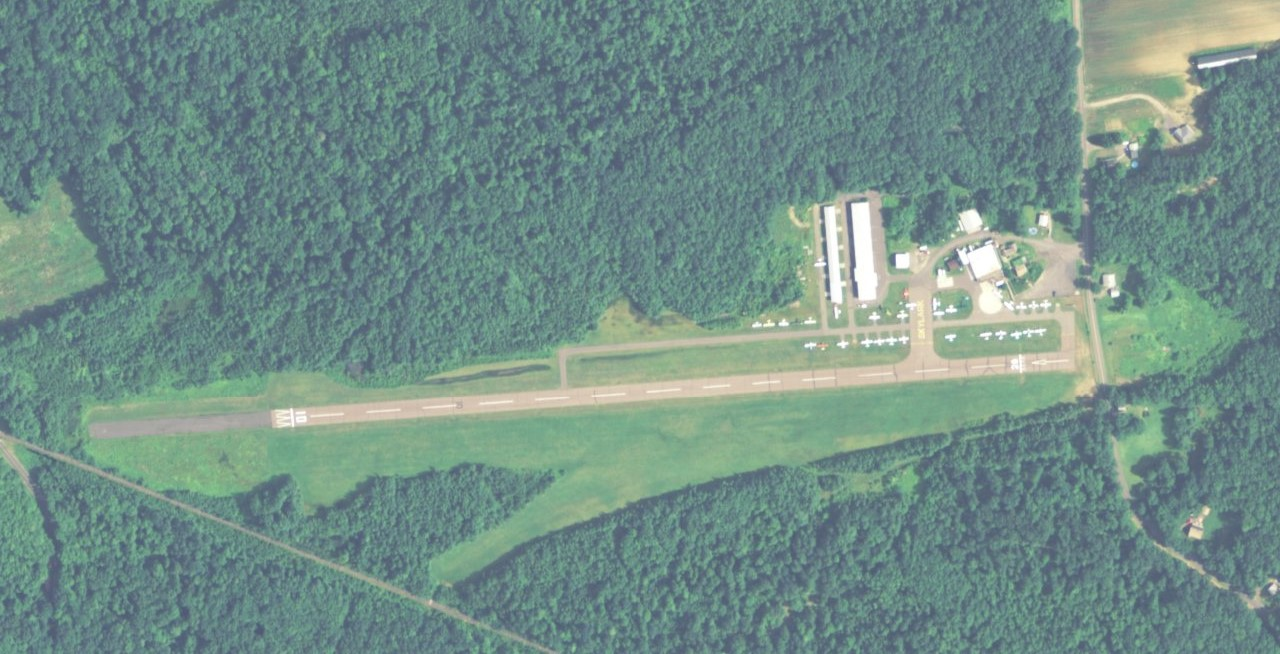
- USGS 2006 orthophoto
- IATA: none; ICAO: none; FAA LID: 7B6

Summary
- Airport type: Public
- Owner: Skylark Airpark, Inc.
- Operator: William Kulle
- Serves: East Windsor, Connecticut
- Location: Connecticut
- Elevation AMSL: 120 ft (37 m)
- Coordinates: 41°55′42″N 72°34′35″W
- Website: skylarkairpark.com

Map
- Interactive map of Skylark Airpark

Runways
Direction	Length		Surface
Direction	ft	m	Surface
10/28	3,242	988	Asphalt

Statistics (2008)
- Aircraft operations: 16,790
- Based aircraft: 71
- Source: Federal Aviation Administration

Skylark Airpark (FAA LID: 7B6) is located in Warehouse Point, Connecticut, United States.

== Facilities and aircraft ==
Skylark Airpark is situated two miles east of the central business district, and contains one runway. The runway, 10/28, is Asphalt measuring 3,242 ft × 60 ft (988 m × 18 m).

For the 12-month period ending April 30, 2008, the airport had 16,190 aircraft operations, an average of 46 per day: 93% local general aviation, 6% transient general aviation, <1% air taxi, and <1% military. At that time there were 71 aircraft based at this airport: 99% single-engine and 1% multi engine.

== See also ==
- List of airports in Connecticut
