= Windham Airport =

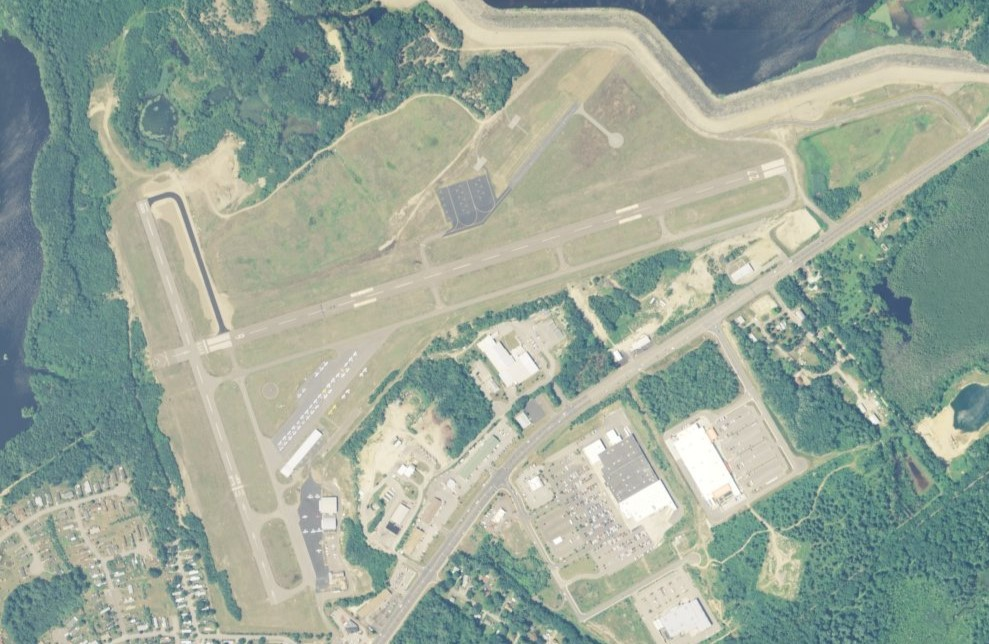
- USGS 2006 orthophoto
- IATA: none; ICAO: KIJD; FAA LID: IJD

Summary
- Airport type: Public
- Owner: Connecticut Airport Authority
- Location: Windham, Connecticut
- Elevation AMSL: 247 ft (75 m)
- Coordinates: 41°44′39″N 072°10′49″W
- Website: IJD website

Maps
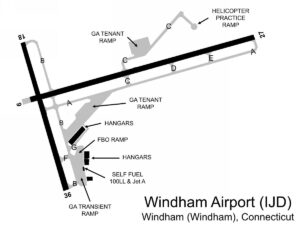
- Interactive map of Windham Airport

Runways
Direction	Length		Surface
Direction	ft	m	Surface
9/27	4,278	1,304	Asphalt
18/36	2,797	853	Asphalt

Statistics (2005)
- Aircraft operations: 30,690
- Based aircraft: 67
- Source: Federal Aviation Administration

Windham Airport (ICAO: KIJD, FAA LID: IJD) is a public airport located three miles (5 km) northeast of the central business district of Willimantic, a city in Windham County, Connecticut, United States. It is owned by the Connecticut Airport Authority. It is included in the Federal Aviation Administration (FAA) National Plan of Integrated Airport Systems for 2017–2021, in which it is categorized as a local general aviation facility.

Although most U.S. airports use the same three-letter location identifier for the FAA and IATA, Windham Airport is assigned IJD by the FAA but has no designation from the IATA.

== History ==
The land that would become Windham Airport was acquired by the Town of Windham in 1923, when approximately 250 acres at Kirby Flats were purchased for aviation use.

Construction of the airport began in 1937 as a Works Progress Administration (WPA) project during the Great Depression, and the airport officially opened in 1938.

During National Air Mail Week in May 1938, Windham Airport served as the regional air mail hub for 28 communities in northeastern Connecticut.

Between 1942 and 1943, the airport was expanded to support wartime aviation operations during World War II.

On June 18, 1946, a Pan American Lockheed Constellation operating a transatlantic flight made an emergency landing at Windham Airport after developing engine trouble. All 52 passengers and crew landed safely. Passengers included actors Laurence Olivier and Vivien Leigh.

The airport's first permanent hangars were constructed in 1947 by the City of Willimantic and Card Flying Service.

In 1950, approximately 51 acres of airport property were transferred for construction of the Mansfield Hollow Dam and Reservoir.

An additional 52 acres were acquired from the federal government in 1968, allowing the extension of Runway 18/36.

Ownership of the airport was transferred to the State of Connecticut in 1975.

A 1980 airport master plan resulted in the closure of Runway 6/24, which was subsequently converted to aircraft parking and storage.

Management of Windham Airport was transferred from the Connecticut Department of Transportation to the Connecticut Airport Authority in 2013.

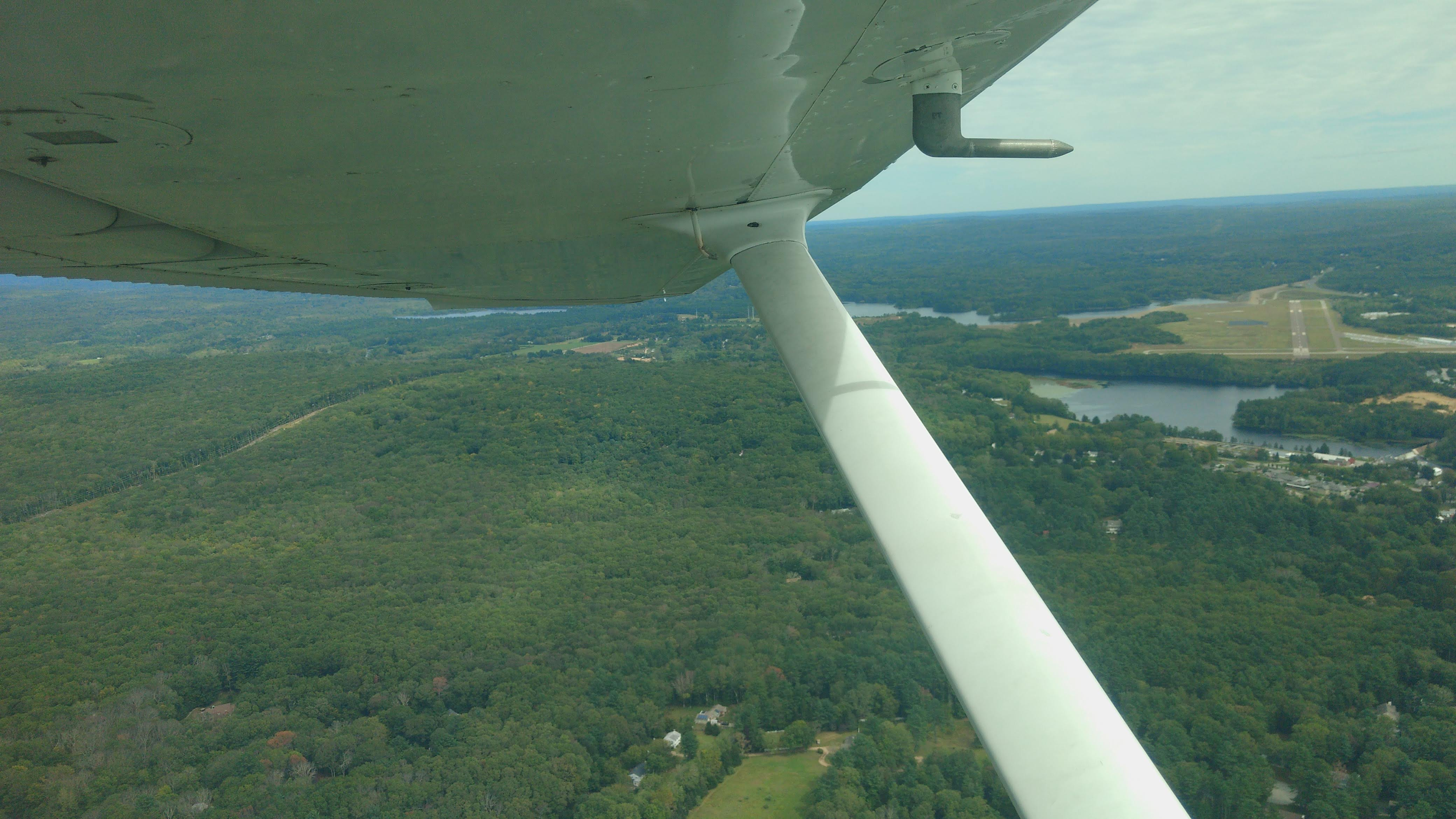
View from aircraft (right)

== Facilities and aircraft ==
Windham Airport covers an area of 280 acres (110 ha) which contains two asphalt paved runways: 9/27 measuring 4,278 by 100 ft (1,304 by 30 m) and 18/36 measuring 2,797 by 75 ft (853 by 23 m).

For the 12-month period ending October 1, 2005, the airport had 30,690 aircraft operations, an average of 84 per day: 98% general aviation, 2% air taxi and <1% military. In 2005, there were 67 aircraft based at this airport: 93% single engine and 7% multi-engine.

Rentable aircraft include a single Cessna 172s.

A flight school is located on the airport, and offers training in a Cessna 172.

== Climate ==
Climate data for Windham County, Connecticut (including University of Connecticut and Storrs, Connecticut), 1991–2020 normals, extremes 1888–present
Month	Jan	Feb	Mar	Apr	May	Jun	Jul	Aug	Sep	Oct	Nov	Dec	Year
Record high °F (°C)	68 (20)	69 (21)	83 (28)	95 (35)	93 (34)	96 (36)	101 (38)	97 (36)	97 (36)	89 (32)	82 (28)	73 (23)	101 (38)
Mean maximum °F (°C)	56.4 (13.6)	55.2 (12.9)	64.1 (17.8)	77.7 (25.4)	84.1 (28.9)	87.3 (30.7)	89.8 (32.1)	87.8 (31.0)	84.0 (28.9)	76.1 (24.5)	68.2 (20.1)	59.8 (15.4)	91.6 (33.1)
Mean daily maximum °F (°C)	35.0 (1.7)	37.2 (2.9)	44.8 (7.1)	57.0 (13.9)	67.6 (19.8)	75.6 (24.2)	80.5 (26.9)	79.1 (26.2)	72.7 (22.6)	61.3 (16.3)	50.3 (10.2)	40.1 (4.5)	58.4 (14.7)
Daily mean °F (°C)	26.9 (−2.8)	28.8 (−1.8)	36.3 (2.4)	47.5 (8.6)	57.7 (14.3)	66.3 (19.1)	71.7 (22.1)	70.0 (21.1)	63.4 (17.4)	52.1 (11.2)	42.1 (5.6)	32.7 (0.4)	49.6 (9.8)
Mean daily minimum °F (°C)	18.8 (−7.3)	20.4 (−6.4)	27.8 (−2.3)	38.0 (3.3)	47.7 (8.7)	57.0 (13.9)	62.8 (17.1)	60.9 (16.1)	54.1 (12.3)	42.9 (6.1)	34.0 (1.1)	25.3 (−3.7)	40.8 (4.9)
Mean minimum °F (°C)	−0.2 (−17.9)	3.2 (−16.0)	11.1 (−11.6)	26.6 (−3.0)	36.4 (2.4)	44.9 (7.2)	53.3 (11.8)	51.2 (10.7)	40.3 (4.6)	29.7 (−1.3)	20.0 (−6.7)	9.9 (−12.3)	−2.1 (−18.9)
Record low °F (°C)	−19 (−28)	−20 (−29)	−6 (−21)	10 (−12)	25 (−4)	35 (2)	42 (6)	37 (3)	26 (−3)	16 (−9)	1 (−17)	−17 (−27)	−20 (−29)
Average precipitation inches (mm)	3.65 (93)	2.99 (76)	4.38 (111)	4.23 (107)	3.73 (95)	4.52 (115)	4.01 (102)	4.30 (109)	4.48 (114)	4.58 (116)	3.90 (99)	4.50 (114)	49.27 (1,251)
Average snowfall inches (cm)	8.3 (21)	14.1 (36)	6.3 (16)	1.7 (4.3)	0.0 (0.0)	0.0 (0.0)	0.0 (0.0)	0.0 (0.0)	0.0 (0.0)	0.3 (0.76)	1.1 (2.8)	7.2 (18)	39.0 (99)
Average precipitation days (≥ 0.01 in)	10.2	9.0	10.2	11.3	12.7	10.9	10.5	9.5	9.0	10.6	9.1	10.4	123.4
Average snowy days (≥ 0.1 in)	3.8	4.0	2.5	0.6	0.0	0.0	0.0	0.0	0.0	0.1	0.4	2.1	13.5
Source 1: NOAA
Source 2: National Weather Service

== See also ==
- List of airports in Connecticut
