= Toutant Airport =

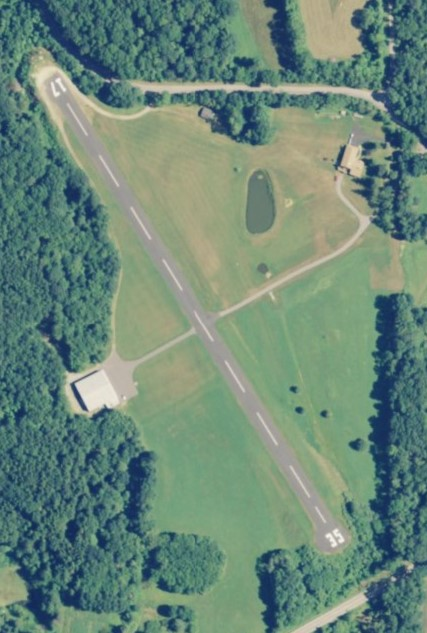
- USGS 2006 orthophoto
- IATA: none; ICAO: none; FAA LID: C44

Summary
- Airport type: Public
- Owner: Roland J. Toutant
- Operator: Roland J. Toutant
- Serves: Putnam
- Location: Connecticut
- Elevation AMSL: 770 ft (230 m)
- Coordinates: 41°57′20″N 72°3′15″W

Map
- Interactive map of Toutant Airport

Runways
Direction	Length		Surface
Direction	ft	m	Surface
17/35	1,756	535	Asphalt

Statistics (2009)
- Aircraft operations: 200
- Based aircraft: 4
- Source: Federal Aviation Administration

Toutant Airport (FAA LID: C44), is located in Woodstock, Connecticut, United States.

== Facilities and aircraft ==
Toutant Airport is situated six miles northwest of the central business district of Putnam, Connecticut, and contains one runway. The runway, 17/35, is asphalt measuring 1756 x 60 ft (535 x 18 m).

For the 12-month period ending April 30, 2015, the airport had 200 aircraft operations, an average of 200 per year: 40% local general aviation, and 60% transient general aviation. At that time there were 4 aircraft based at this airport: 25% single-engine, 50% helicopter, and 25% ultralight.

== See also ==
- List of airports in Connecticut
