= Ellington Airport (Connecticut) =

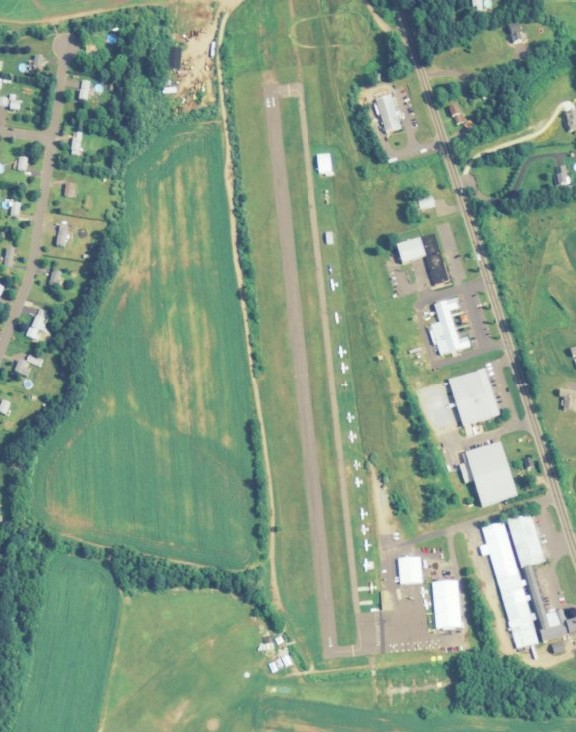
- USGS 2006 orthophoto
- IATA: none; ICAO: none; FAA LID: 7B9

Summary
- Airport type: Public use
- Owner: J.L.M. Assoc
- Serves: Ellington, Connecticut
- Elevation AMSL: 253 ft (77 m)
- Coordinates: 41°55′32″N 072°27′26″W
- Website: EllingtonAirport.com

Map
- Interactive map of Ellington Airport

Runways
Direction	Length		Surface
Direction	ft	m	Surface
1/19	1,800	549	Asphalt

Statistics (2009)
- Aircraft operations: 29,120
- Based aircraft: 34
- Source: Federal Aviation Administration

Ellington Airport (FAA LID: 7B9) is a privately owned, public use airport located two nautical miles (4 km) north of the central business district of Ellington, a town in Tolland County, Connecticut, United States.

The airport, which is open to the public, is one of two Connecticut airports that is state certified as a parachute jump zone. Connecticut Parachutists Inc. has its home base at the airport.

== Facilities and aircraft ==
Ellington Airport covers an area of 15 acres (6 ha) at an elevation of 253 feet (77 m) above mean sea level. It has one runway designated 1/19 with an asphalt surface measuring 1,800 by 50 feet (549 x 15 m).

For the 12-month period ending April 23, 2009, the airport had 29,120 aircraft operations, an average of 79 per day: 99.9% general aviation and 0.1% air taxi. At that time there were 34 aircraft based at this airport: 59% single-engine, 23% helicopter, and 18% ultralight.

== See also ==
- List of airports in Connecticut
