= Reliant Air =

Airline of the United States

IATA	ICAO	Call sign
—	RLI	RELIANT
- Founded: 1988
- Operating bases: Danbury Municipal Airport
- Hubs: Danbury Municipal Airport
- Focus cities: Nantucket Memorial Airport, Westchester County Airport
- Fleet size: 6
- Headquarters: Danbury, Connecticut
- Key people: Wayne R. Toher (Co-Founder & CEO)
- Website: www.flyreliant.com

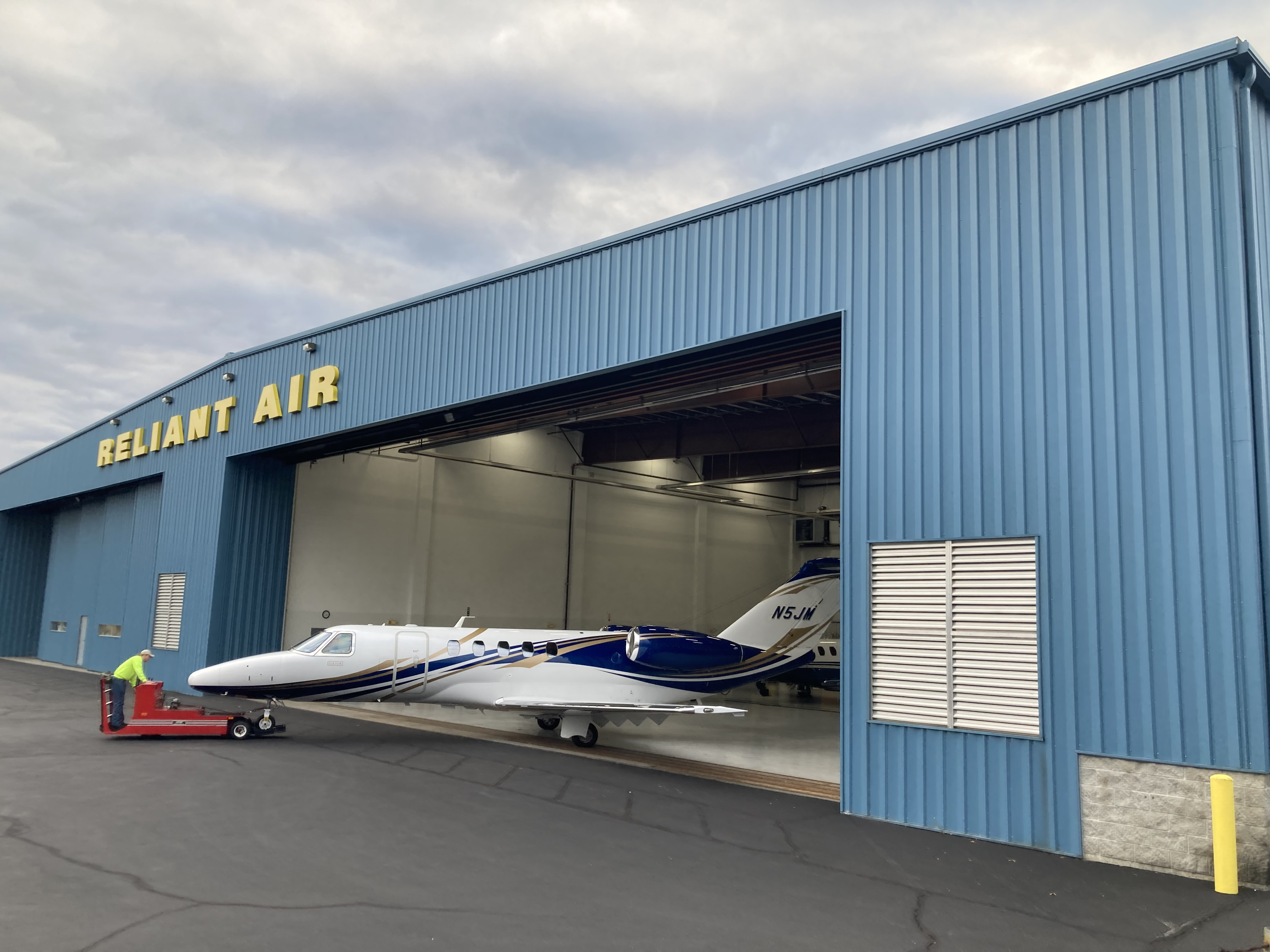
Cessna Citation CJ4 (N5JM), outside the Reliant Air hangar at Danbury Municipal Airport

Reliant Air is a regional and charter airline based in Danbury, Connecticut, United States. With its main base at Danbury Municipal Airport, it provides scheduled service to Nantucket and operates charters to other destinations.

== History ==
The airline operation was established in 1988. Reliant Air has been in continuous service since then, under the same private ownership.

Reliant Aircraft Service was established by Wayne Toher in 1981. In 1988 Toher and partner Phillip Kelsey started Reliant Air Charter.

Reliant Air formerly operated twin engine piston aircraft. The company has shifted to a majority light jet fleet, along with one King Air.

== Destinations for scheduled flights ==
State	City	Airport
Connecticut	Danbury	Danbury Municipal Airport
Massachusetts	Nantucket	Nantucket Memorial Airport
New York	White Plains	Westchester County Airport

== Fleet ==
As of March 2023, the Reliant Air fleet consists of the following aircraft:

Reliant Air fleet
Aircraft	In Fleet
Cessna Citation CJ4	3
Cessna Citation CJ3	2
King Air 350	1
Total	6
