= Simsbury Airport =

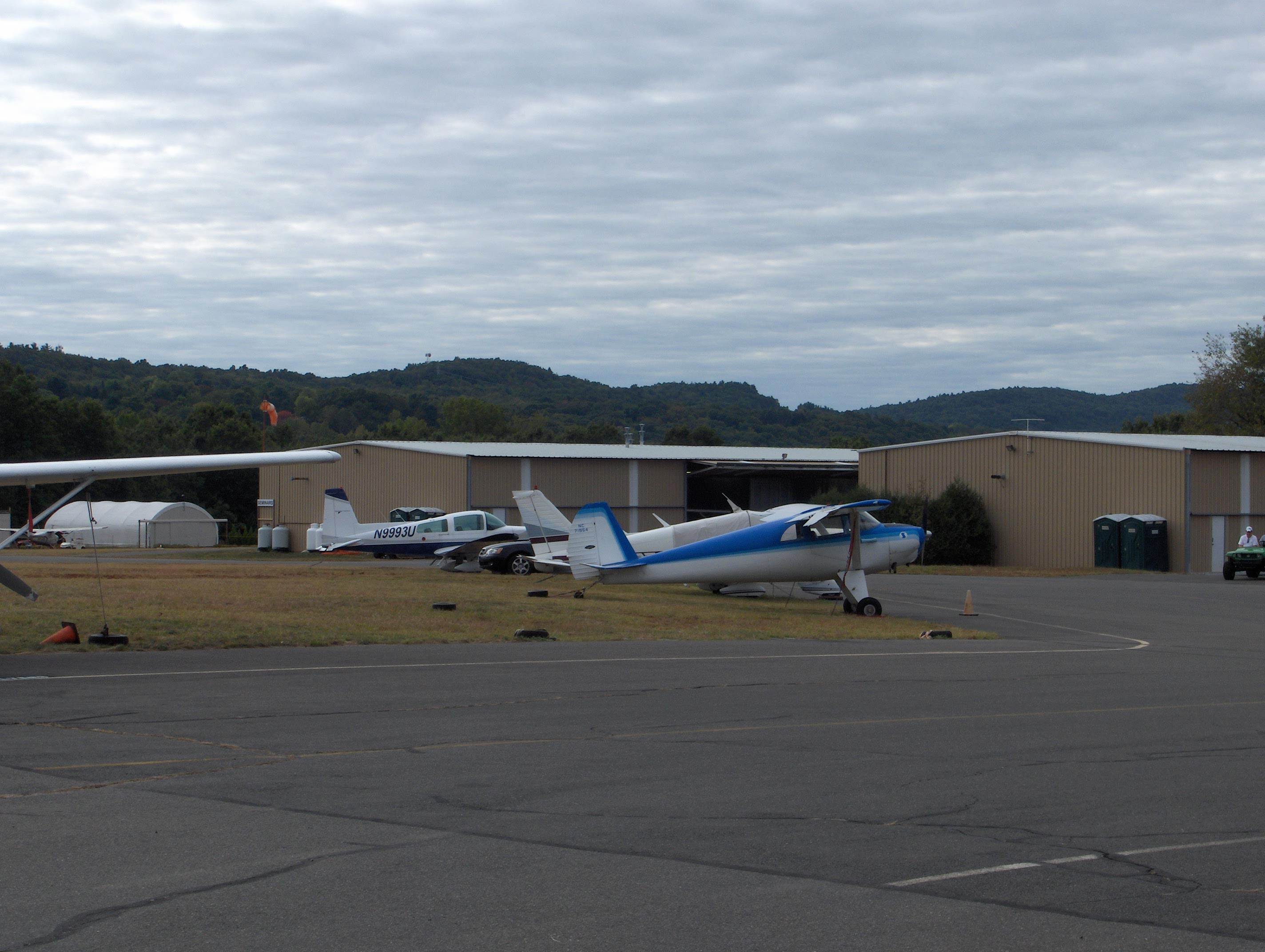
- IATA: none; ICAO: none; FAA LID: 4B9

Summary
- Airport type: Public
- Owner: Airport Realty Association, LLC
- Operator: Simsbury Flying Club
- Location: Simsbury, Connecticut
- Elevation AMSL: 195 ft (59 m)
- Coordinates: 41°55′00″N 072°46′38″W
- Website: www.simsburyairport.com

Map
- Interactive map of Simsbury Airport

Runways
Direction	Length		Surface
Direction	ft	m	Surface
3/21	2,205	672	Asphalt

Statistics (1997)
- Aircraft operations: 12,775
- Based aircraft: 52
- Source: Federal Aviation Administration

Simsbury Airport (FAA LID: 4B9) is a public use airport located in Simsbury and East Granby, both towns in Hartford County, Connecticut, United States. It is privately owned by the Airport Realty Association, LLC. The airport is operated by the Simsbury Flying Club, a not-for-profit group that operates an FBO at the airport. It is included in the Federal Aviation Administration (FAA) National Plan of Integrated Airport Systems for 2017–2021, in which it is categorized as a general aviation facility.

== Facilities and aircraft ==
Simsbury Airport covers an area of 103 acres (42 ha) which contains one asphalt paved runway (3/21) measuring 2,205 x 50 ft (672 x 15 m).

For the 12-month period ending June 30, 2008, the airport had 12,775 aircraft operations, an average of 35 per day: 99% general aviation and 1% air taxi. There are 52 aircraft based at this airport: 96% single engine and 4% multi-engine.

== Fly-In ==
The Simsbury Fly-In is held on the third Sunday each September. The event, which as many as 10,000 people, 150 airplanes, and over 400 classic autos have attended in the past, also showcases parachute jumpers and a simulated rescue by a LifeStar helicopter, and has vendors and manufacturers displaying their products.

== Incidents and accidents ==
- On December 27, 2011, around 12:45 pm, a gyrocopter crashed upon landing on runway 3. The aircraft flew into a patch of rough air and the pilot lost control which resulted in a major loss of altitude. The gyrocopter made a crash landing in a nearby landfill and flipped over from the blades hitting the ground. The pilot walked away with no injuries, but his gyrocopter was destroyed.
- On September 8, 2019, shortly before 2:30pm local time, emergency crews responded to a call of an airplane that went off the end of the runway. The aircraft went down a slight embankment near the airport. There was no structural damage to the aircraft and no reported injuries.
- On November 24, 2019, at 8:40AM, a plane carrying a flight instructor and student pilot crashed into a vehicle crossing the runway. The impact caused the plane to flip over, but emergency responders noted that no one was injured. Vehicles are not allowed on the runway, and it was not clear at the time of the incident why the driver had been crossing the runway.
- On June 2, 2026, at 12:50PM local time, a vintage 1946 Piper J3C-65 with two people on board crashed in East Granby after taking off from the airport.

== See also ==
- List of airports in Connecticut
