= Meriden Markham Municipal Airport =

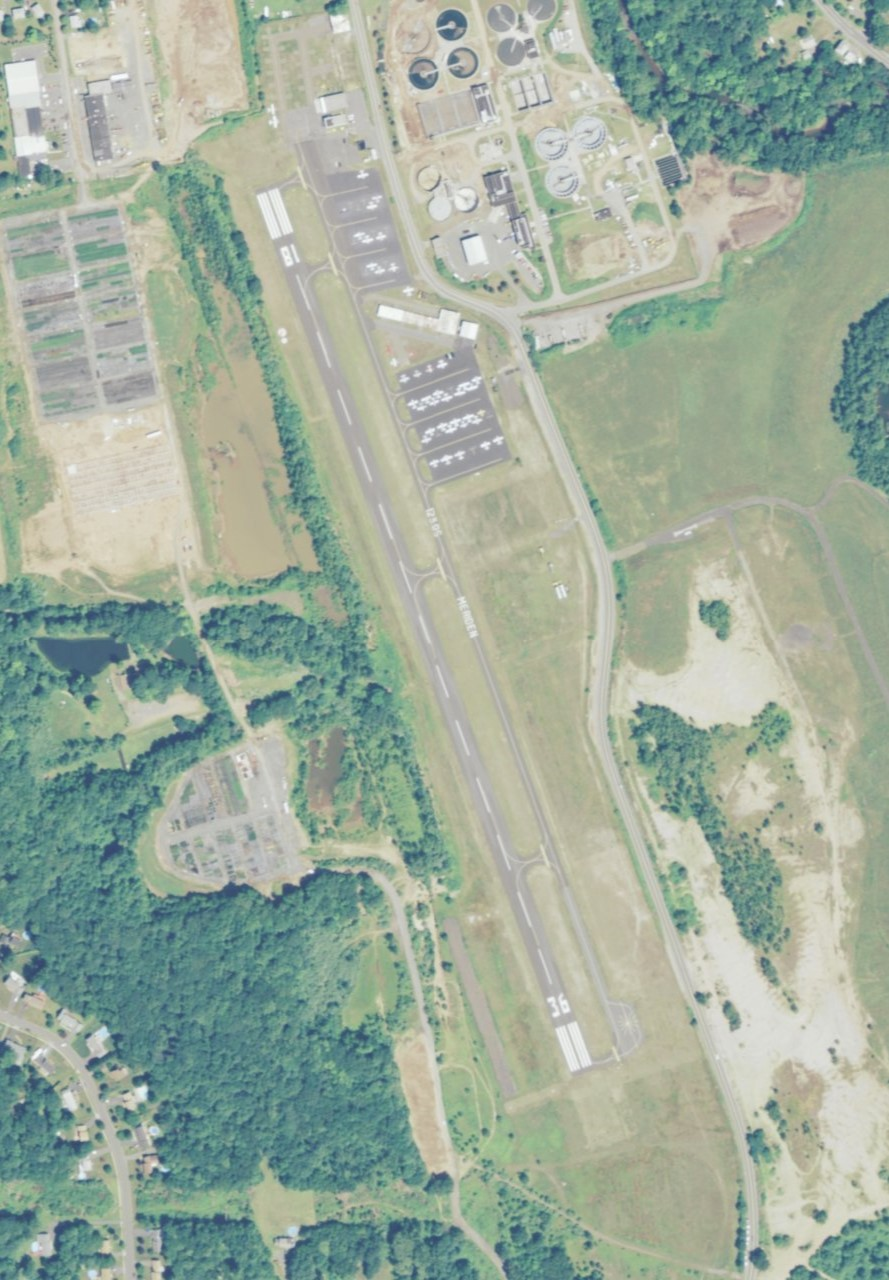
- USGS 2006 orthophoto
- IATA: none; ICAO: KMMK; FAA LID: MMK

Summary
- Airport type: Public
- Owner: City of Meriden
- Location: Meriden, Connecticut
- Elevation AMSL: 103 ft (31 m)
- Coordinates: 41°30′31″N 072°49′46″W
- Website: meridenmarkham.com

Map
- Interactive map of Meriden Markham Municipal Airport

Runways
Direction	Length		Surface
Direction	ft	m	Surface
18/36	3,100	945	Asphalt

Statistics (2002)
- Aircraft operations: 18,028
- Based aircraft: 60
- Source: Federal Aviation Administration

Meriden Markham Municipal Airport (ICAO: KMMK, FAA LID: MMK) is a public-use airport located three miles (5 km) southwest of the central business district of Meriden, a city in New Haven County, Connecticut, United States. This general aviation airport is owned by City of Meriden. It is included in the Federal Aviation Administration (FAA) National Plan of Integrated Airport Systems for 2017–2021, in which it is categorized as a local general aviation facility.

Although most U.S. airports use the same three-letter location identifier for the FAA and IATA, Meriden Markham Municipal Airport is assigned MMK by the FAA but has no designation from the IATA (which assigned MMK to Murmansk Airport in Murmansk, Russia).

== History ==
The history of the airport goes back to at least 1928, when Ernest L. Markham was named the first airport manager; on 14 July 1962 the airport was renamed in honor of Markham for his 32 years of dedicated service.

In the summer of 2020, the airport added new hangars to increase the capacity of hangared aircraft.

== Oversight and policies ==
Operations at MMK are overseen by the Meriden Aviation Commission, which meets the second Tuesday of each month at 6:00 p.m. in the airport terminal building.

Noise abatement procedures are in place at this airport, with pilots being required to fly runway heading until ascending to 1,100 msl.

Operations requires that touch and go type landings are only to be performed on runway 18 due to terrain on the takeoff on runway 36. Full stop landings and takeoffs are permitted on runways 18 and 36.

== Facilities and aircraft ==
Meriden Markham Municipal Airport covers an area of 157 acres (64 ha) which contains one asphalt paved runway (18/36) measuring 3,100 x 75 ft (945 x 23 m).

For the 12-month period ending May 30, 2007, the airport had 18,028 aircraft operations, an average of 49 per day: 97% local general aviation, 1% transient general aviation, 1% air taxi and <1% military. There were 70 aircraft based at this airport: 96% single engine, 3% multi-engine and 1% helicopters.

The Connecticut Wing Civil Air Patrol Silver City Cadet Squadron (NER-CT-014) operates out of the airport.

Meriden Aviation Center, located at the airport, provides plane rental services (Piper PA28-161 aircraft) as well as flight instruction.

The fixed-base operator is Mustang Aviation.

== See also ==
- List of airports in Connecticut
