= Connecticut Wing Civil Air Patrol =

Echelon of the Civil Air Patrol in Connecticut

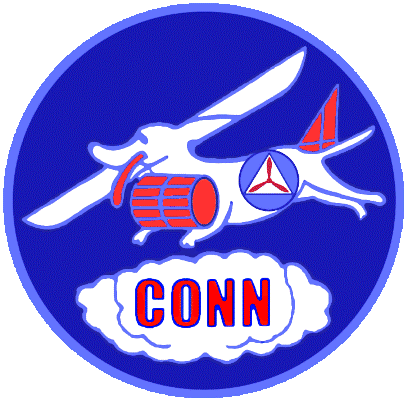
- Connecticut Wing of Civil Air Patrol

Associated branches
- United States Air Force

Command staff
- Commander: Col Ashley LaPlante
- Deputy Commander: Lt Col Meghan Brownell
- Chief of Staff: Maj Scott Farley

Current statistics
- Cadets: 341
- Seniors: 329
- Total Membership: 670
- Website: ctwg.cap.gov
- Statistics as of July 21, 2026

The Connecticut Wing Civil Air Patrol is the highest echelon of Civil Air Patrol in the state of Connecticut. Headquartered in Beers Hall at the Connecticut Valley Hospital campus in Middletown, Connecticut, Connecticut Wing (CTWG) has 11 primary subordinate units located throughout the state to help it carry out its missions. The missions include providing aerospace education and training for all of its members, teaching leadership skills to Connecticut youth, and performing various domestic emergency services for the United States of America in a noncombatant capacity.

Members were notably instrumental in major events during the Wing's 75-year history, carrying out operations in World War II, 9/11, and the Hurricane Katrina disaster. The Wing has received numerous awards and recognitions, including unit citations from the Northeast Region Headquarters and National Headquarters, as well as government recognition by local, state and federal officials. Several individual members, including most cadet officers, are recognized by the Connecticut General Assembly upon receiving their promotions. Governor M. Jodi Rell declared December 1, 2007, Civil Air Patrol Day in the State of Connecticut, in recognition of the continuing efforts of the Wing and held as an anniversary to the Wing's creation on December 1, 1941. The Wing currently has more than 650 members.

== History ==
During World War II, Connecticut Wing was heavily involved in coastal patrol and anti-submarine missions along its section of the Atlantic coast. For this, it received two air medals from the U.S. government. Connecticut Wing also flew recovery operations to rescue American pilots who had lost their aircraft domestically. One of the Sikorsky S-39 Flying Boats used for recovery operations is now on display at the New England Air Museum at Bradley International Airport in Windsor Locks, Connecticut.

Among the other missions that Connecticut Wing currently performs is the Long Island Sound Patrol (LISP) program. LISP flies patrol missions across Long Island Sound during the summer months in coordination with the United States Coast Guard to provide more immediate assistance to vessels in distress. The Wing was credited with numerous finds and saves in the year following its inception in summer 2007, and plans are in effect to continue the program.

== Current command structure ==
As of May 2024, the Wing Commander of CTWG is Col Ashley LaPlante. As of August 2021, The Vice Commander position is held by Lt Col Meghan Brownell. The Chief of Staff is Maj Scott Farley. The Vice Commander is responsible for coordinating the wing echelon with the subordinate units, specifically the squadrons. The Vice Commander is also an assistant of the Wing Commander, serving as the coordinator of various special projects. The Chief of Staff is responsible for the staff members located at wing headquarters, who are independent of the individual squadrons. Finally, the Wing Commander is responsible for connecting the two groups and ensuring that the Chief of Staff uses the wing staff members to benefit the squadrons who receive these benefits through the Vice Commander.

Most of the wing-level staff positions fit into various departments led by directors. For example, Emergency Services Officer (DOS) and Ground Training Officer (GO) fit into the Operations Department, led by the Director of Operations (DO). Other positions are not in departments, such as the Finance Officer (FM) and Safety Officer (SE).

Wing staff members meet at the headquarters building, Beers Hall, on the Connecticut Valley Hospital campus in Middletown, Connecticut. They also attend monthly "staff call" meetings to improve internal communication.

== Squadrons ==
All 11 of Connecticut's squadrons report directly to Wing Headquarters. There are also three non-standard units (000, 001, and 999) under Wing HQ, and there are liaisons with units in other branches of the armed forces, including the AFROTC at the University of Connecticut, which partners with Civil Air Patrol (CAP).

Squadrons of the Connecticut Wing
Designation	Squadron Name	Location
CT-000	Inactive Squadron	No specific location
CT-001	Wing Headquarters Staff Squadron	Middletown
CT-004	103rd Composite Squadron	East Granby
CT-007	Igor Sikorsky Senior Squadron	Oxford
CT-011	143rd Composite Squadron	Waterbury
CT-014	Silver City Cadet Squadron	Meriden
CT-022	Stratford Eagles Composite Squadron	Stratford
CT-042	399th Composite Squadron	Danbury
CT-058	186th Composite Squadron	Plainville
CT-062	Northwest Hills Composite Squadron	Torrington
CT-071	Royal Charter Composite Squadron	Hartford
CT-073	Minuteman Composite Squadron	East Haven
CT-075	Thames River Composite Squadron	Groton
CT-999	Legislative Senior Squadron	No specific location
none	USAF Reserve Officer Training Corps Det. 115	Storrs

== Commanders ==
Col Peter Jensen began a history restoration project in 2007 in an effort to uncover as much about Connecticut Wing's history as possible. Photographs were found of all of the previous Wing commanders, and were restored by Wing staff members. Notable commanders of Connecticut Wing include Col Tier (née Hopkins), who was the niece of Lady Astor and the Civil Air Patrol's first female wing commander. Col Frost was slated to be the next Northeast Region commander after he relinquished command of the Wing, but he died before assuming command. Col Howard Palmer during his term as Wing commander established activities for the cadet membership, and the Col Howard E. Palmer Memorial Cadet Ball is conducted annually in his honor by the Connecticut Wing Cadet Advisory Council.

Commander's Name	Period of Service	Current Status
Lt Col Thomas H Lockhart	1941–1944	Died in 1992
Lt Col William T Gilbert	1944–1946	Died in 1965
Col Charles B Shutter	1946–1947, 1949–1953	Died in 1953
Col Nancy Tier	1947–1949	Died in 1997
Col Robert A Frost	1953–1957	Died in 1957
Col Raymond E Drouin	1957	Died in 1957
Col James F Kavanagh	1958–1963	Died in 1977
Col Clinton G Litchfield	1963–1971	Died in 1978
Col Joseph B Witkin	1971–1977	Died in 2002
Col Kenneth D Faust	1977–1982	Died in 2007
Col Howard E Palmer	1982–1993	Died in 1995
Col Lloyd E Sturges	1993–1997	Wing Director of Operations
Col Frederick Herbert	1997–1999	Died in 2015
Col Karen K Hansen	1999–2003	Died in 2013
Col James E Palmer	2003–2006	Died in 2019
Col Peter K Jensen	2006–2009	Retired from CAP
Col Cassandra Huchko	2010–2013	Wing Advisor to the wing commander
Col Ken Chapman	2013–2017	
Col James Ridley Sr.	2017-2021	Region Chief of Staff
Col Matthew Valleau	2021-2024	Region Communications
Col Ashley LaPlante	2024-	Current Wing Commander

== Icons and symbols ==
The most prominent icon representing the wing is the Connecticut Wing's patch, with an ultramarine blue background and bearing the image of its mascot, Connie the Search and Rescue Dog. The wing patch was required to be worn on the left sleeve of the battle dress uniform until 2006 when National Headquarters made it optional. Each squadron also has a distinctive patch. A 2007 issue of Civil Air Patrol Volunteer magazine featured an image of all of Connecticut Wing's squadron patches surrounding the Wing patch.

Connecticut Wing is also symbolized by the name "Charter Oak", which precedes all CTWG radio callsigns. Since Connecticut is in the Northeast region, it also uses callsigns that start with "CAP Stone", the Northeast region prefix.

== Cadet activities ==
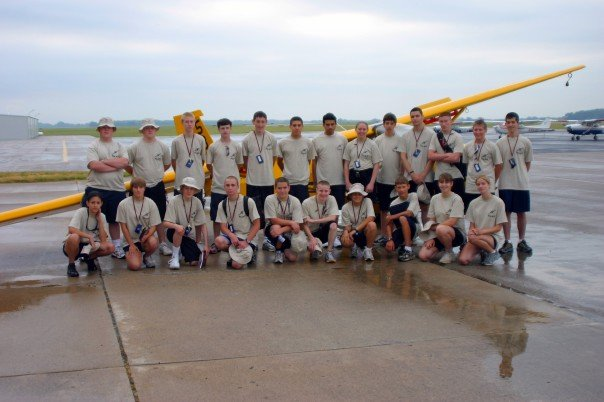
CAP cadets visit other Wings each year across the country to partake in National Cadet Special Activities, such as the National Flight Academy – Glider Track

The largest cadet activity held by the Wing is the annual Summer Encampment.

The Wing Commander and Director of Cadet Programs also runs the application process as per national regulations for the National Cadet Special Activities in Civil Air Patrol.

Connecticut Wing was featured in the March 2007 edition of Civil Air Patrol Volunteer magazine for an event held at Hartford-Brainard Airport in Hartford, Connecticut, in conjunction with the Connecticut State Police, which provided volunteers side-by-side training with search-and-rescue dogs. Connecticut Wing cadets are currently involved in a competition between squadrons in the field of model rocketry. The final competition is to be held in June 2008 in conjunction with CATO Rocketry Club, the local chapter of the National Association of Rocketry.

The Wing's Cadet Advisory Council also hosts the annual Col Howard E Palmer Cadet Ball in recognition of the longest-serving Wing commander. The event is held during the fall season each year and is intended as an informal social gathering to promote inter-squadron cooperation. Nearly one half of the Wing's cadets attended the 2007 Cadet Ball, with an estimated 139 in attendance.

Additionally, Connecticut Wing holds an annual conference during October. This time is used to allow the Wing commander to address the entire Wing, for guest speakers to give keynote speeches, and for the annual awards to be presented to their recipients. Several competitions for the cadets occur at each conference, including a military drill and ceremonies competition and a public speaking competition. Col Mary Feik, after whom one of CAP's cadet awards is named in honor of her work in women's rights in aviation, was the keynote speaker at the 2007 conference. It is also common to have government representatives attend, including members of the state legislature.

== Recognition and accomplishments ==
The CAP National History project and National Museum most recognize CTWG for their involvement in coastal patrol missions during World War II, shortly after the creation of CAP. Since CAP was created in a time of crisis, when Brigadier General Billy Mitchell was warning the country of impending attack and less than a week before the attack on Pearl Harbor, Hawaii, coastal patrol and submarine searching became the prime missions of CAP.

In the New England Air Museum, located at Bradley International Airport in Windsor Locks, Connecticut, a Sikorsky S-39 Flying Boat can be found that was used during World War II for rescuing pilots of subchasers that had gone down. A local artist painted an oil painting of the aircraft, now prominently displayed next to it in the exhibit. Photos of the exhibit, the unveiling ceremony, and the oil painting can be found at the Wing Headquarters building.

The first two Air Medals presented by the president of the United States to Civil Air Patrol went to Hugh Sharp and Eddie Edwards, who conducted the rescue in the S-39. This successful program, which spotted 173 German U-Boats, dropped 57 depth charges, hit 10 of the U-Boats, and sank two of them, was inevitably discontinued after the end of the second World War. Many of the planes used specifically for this program are now parts of exhibits, replaced by new aircraft that are more suited to teaching young students to fly and performing search and rescue, the current missions of Civil Air Patrol. Currently, CTWG has two Cessna 172s, two Cessna 182s and one Cessna 182T with Garmin G1000 Glass cockpit. Connecticut Wing has the highest number of hours flown per aircraft of any state in the North East Region, and ranks high on a national scale.

The membership of CTWG grew from 500 to 600 total active members during the 2007 fiscal year, making the largest percent increase of any wing in CAP for that year, as was announced at the April 2007 Wing Conference in Cromwell, Connecticut.

== See also ==
- Awards and decorations of the Civil Air Patrol
- Cadet grades and insignia of the Civil Air Patrol
- United States Air Force Rescue Coordination Center
