= Sikorsky Airport =

Sikorsky Airport can refer to:

- Sikorsky Memorial Airport, public airport in Fairfield County, Connecticut, United States
- Igor Sikorsky Kyiv International Airport, international airport in Kyiv, Ukraine
