= 1975 Kjalarnes helicopter crash =

Deadliest helicopter crash in Icelandic aviation history

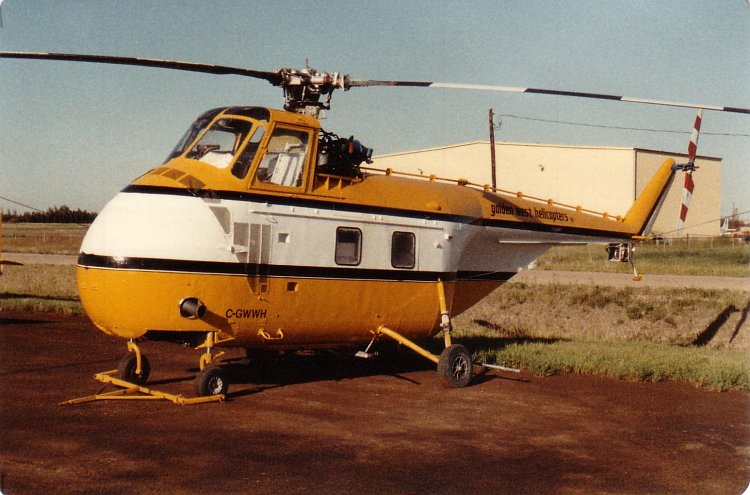
- A Sikorsky S-55C, similar to the accident aircraft

Accident
- Date: January 17, 1975
- Summary: Crashed due to wind conditions
- Site: Hjarðarnes, Hvalfjörður, Iceland; 64.288°N 21.818°W

Aircraft
- Aircraft type: Sikorsky S-55B
- Operator: Þyrluflug hf.
- Registration: TF-LKH
- Flight origin: Reykjavík Airport, Iceland
- Destination: Vegamót, Snæfellsnes, Iceland
- Occupants: 7
- Passengers: 5
- Crew: 2
- Fatalities: 7
- Survivors: 0

The 1975 Kjalarnes helicopter crash occurred on 17 January 1975, when a Sikorsky S-55B helicopter crashed by the Hjarðarnes farm in Hvalfjörður, Iceland, while en route from Reykjavík Airport to Snæfellsnes. Seven people were on board, including two crew members and five employees of RARIK, the Icelandic State Electricity company. Everyone on board was killed on impact. It remains the deadliest helicopter crash in Icelandic aviation history.

== Aircraft and crew ==
The Sikorsky S-55B helicopter was built in 1954 and originally used by the United States Army. It was operated by Orlando Helicopter Airways from 1971 until it was sold to Þyrluflug hf. which received it on 1 January 1975.

The pilot was 31-year old Lúðvík Karlsson, a well known aviation pioneer in Iceland. The second crew member was Kristján S. Helgason, the director of Þyrluflug hf.

== Cause ==
The cause of the crash was ruled to be wind conditions at Hjarðarnes. The helicopter was also believed to have been overloaded but the investigative committee stated that the crash would have likely occurred even if it had been correctly loaded, a ruling confirmed by the Supreme Court of Iceland in 1983.
