= Lúðvík Karlsson =

Icelandic aviator

- Born: 11 May 1943
- Died: 17 January 1975 (aged 31); Hjarðarnes, Hvalfjörður, Iceland
- Cause of death: Helicopter crash

Lúðvík Karlsson (11 May 1943 – 17 January 1975) was an Icelandic aviator, adventurer, competitive glider and businessman. He was killed in the 1975 Kjalarnes helicopter crash along with six other people when a helicopter he was piloting crashed due to severe wind conditions at Hjarðarnes in Hvalfjörður, Iceland.

== Early life ==
Lúðvík was born in 1943 into a wealthy family. He became interested in flying at an early age and finished his flight training in 1964. He soon became one of the best known competitive glider pilots in Iceland.

== In media ==
The character of The Baron in the 1990 novel Í einu höggi by Ómar Ragnarsson is based on Lúðvík.
