= Sikorsky H-19 Chickasaw =

Family of utility helicopters

H-19 Chickasaw / S-55
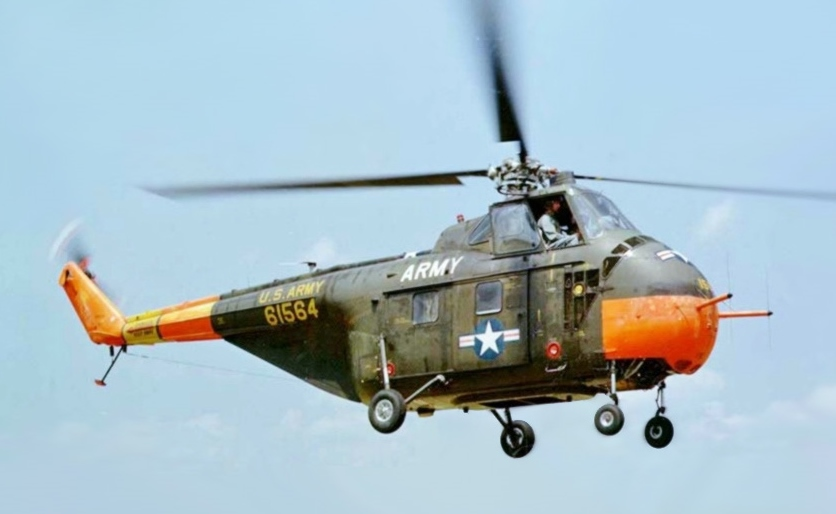
- An Army UH-19D Chickasaw

General information
- Type: Utility helicopter
- Manufacturer: Sikorsky Aircraft
- Primary users: United States Army United States Air Force; United States Navy; United States Coast Guard
- Number built: 1,728

History
- Introduction date: 16 April 1950 (U.S. Air Force)
- First flight: 10 November 1949
- Retired: 26 February 1969 (U.S. Navy)
- Variant: Westland Whirlwind
- Developed into: Sikorsky H-34 (S-58 / Wessex)

The Sikorsky H-19 Chickasaw (company model number S-55) is a multi-purpose piston-engined helicopter that was used by the United States Army and United States Air Force. It was also license-built by Westland Aircraft as the Westland Whirlwind in the United Kingdom. United States Navy and United States Coast Guard models were designated HO4S, while those of the U.S. Marine Corps were designated HRS. In 1962, the U.S. Navy, U.S. Coast Guard and U.S. Marine Corps versions were all redesignated as H-19s like their U.S. Army and U.S. Air Force counterparts.

The H-19 pioneered the use of a nose-mounted radial engine powering a single fully articulated main rotor located above the cabin, which helped maintain a proper center of gravity under varying loading conditions without requiring ballast to maintain longitudinal stability as with prior Sikorsky designs. This layout gave the H-19 series a characteristic bulbous-nosed appearance and made it one of the first truly successful single-rotor utility helicopters, leading to a number of derivative designs including the Sikorsky H-34, which was produced in even greater numbers. The H-19 had a long military career worldwide in the late 20th century, and proved popular with civil operators.

== Development ==
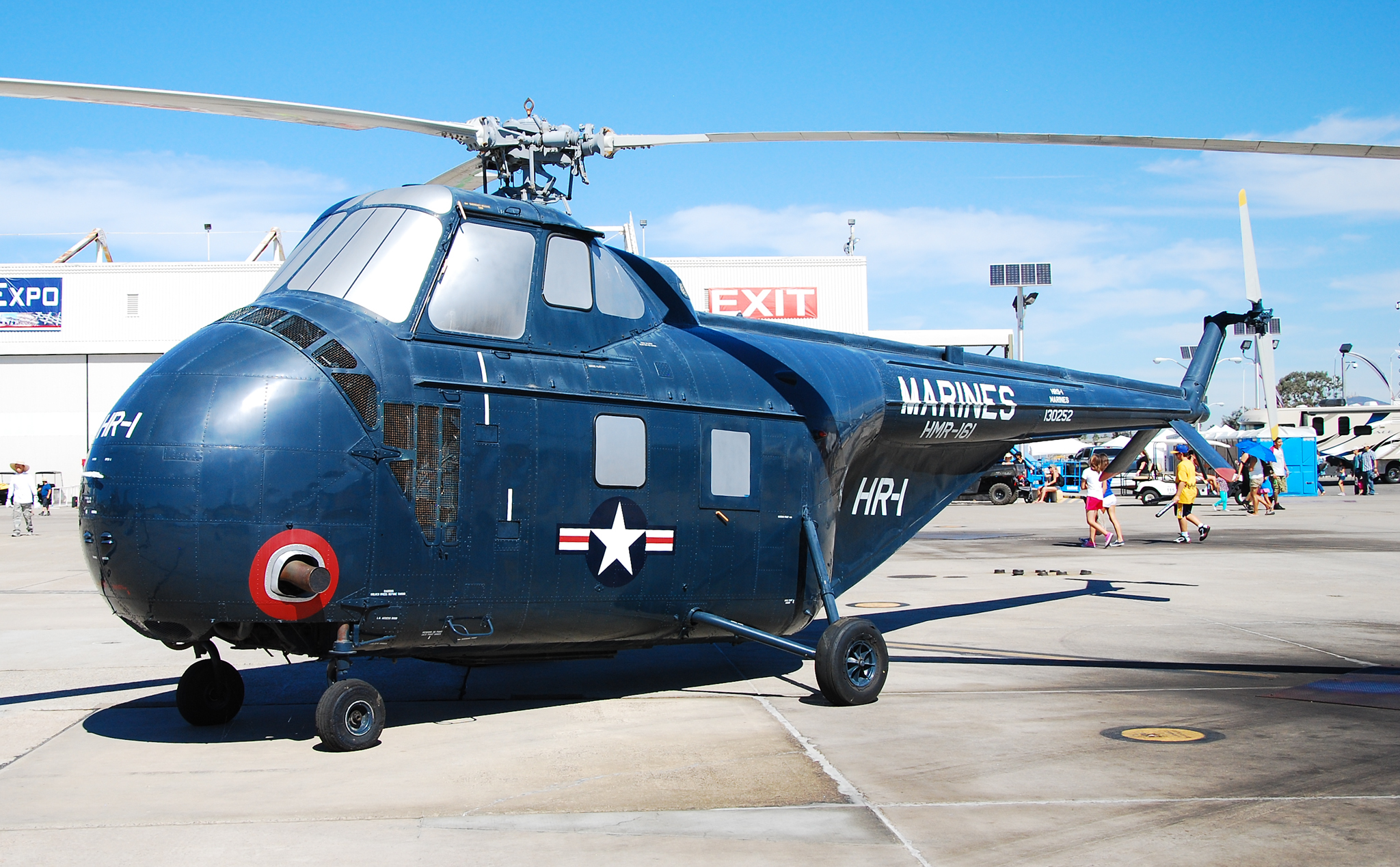
HRS-1 of the USMC, on display at a museum, 2014

Development of the H-19 was initiated privately by Sikorsky without government sponsorship. The helicopter was initially designed as a testbed for several novel design concepts intended to provide greater load-carrying ability in combination with easy maintenance. Under the leadership of designer Edward F. Katzenberger, a mockup was designed and fabricated in less than one year.

The first customer was the United States Air Force, which ordered five YH-19 aircraft for evaluation; the YH-19's first flight was on 10 November 1949, less than a year after the program start date. This was followed by delivery of the first YH-19 to the U.S. Air Force on 16 April 1950 and delivery of the first HO4S-1 helicopter to the U. S. Navy on 31 August 1950. A U.S. Air Force YH-19 was sent to Korea for service trials in March 1951, where it was joined by a second YH-19 in September 1951. On 27 April 1951, the first HRS-1 was delivered to the U.S. Marine Corps, and on 2 May 1951, the first S-55 was delivered to Westland Aircraft.

1,281 of the helicopters were manufactured by Sikorsky in the United States. An additional 447 were manufactured by licensees of the helicopter including Westland Aircraft, SNCASE in France and Mitsubishi in Japan.

The helicopter was widely exported, used by many other nations, including Portugal, Greece, Israel, Chile, South Africa, Denmark and Turkey.

In 1954 the U.S. Marine Corps tested an idea to enhance lift in hot-and-high and/or heavily loaded conditions by installing a rocket nozzle at the tip of each rotor blade with the fuel tank located in the center above the rotor blade hub. Enough fuel was provided for seven minutes of operation. Although tests of the system were considered successful, it was never adopted operationally.

== Design ==
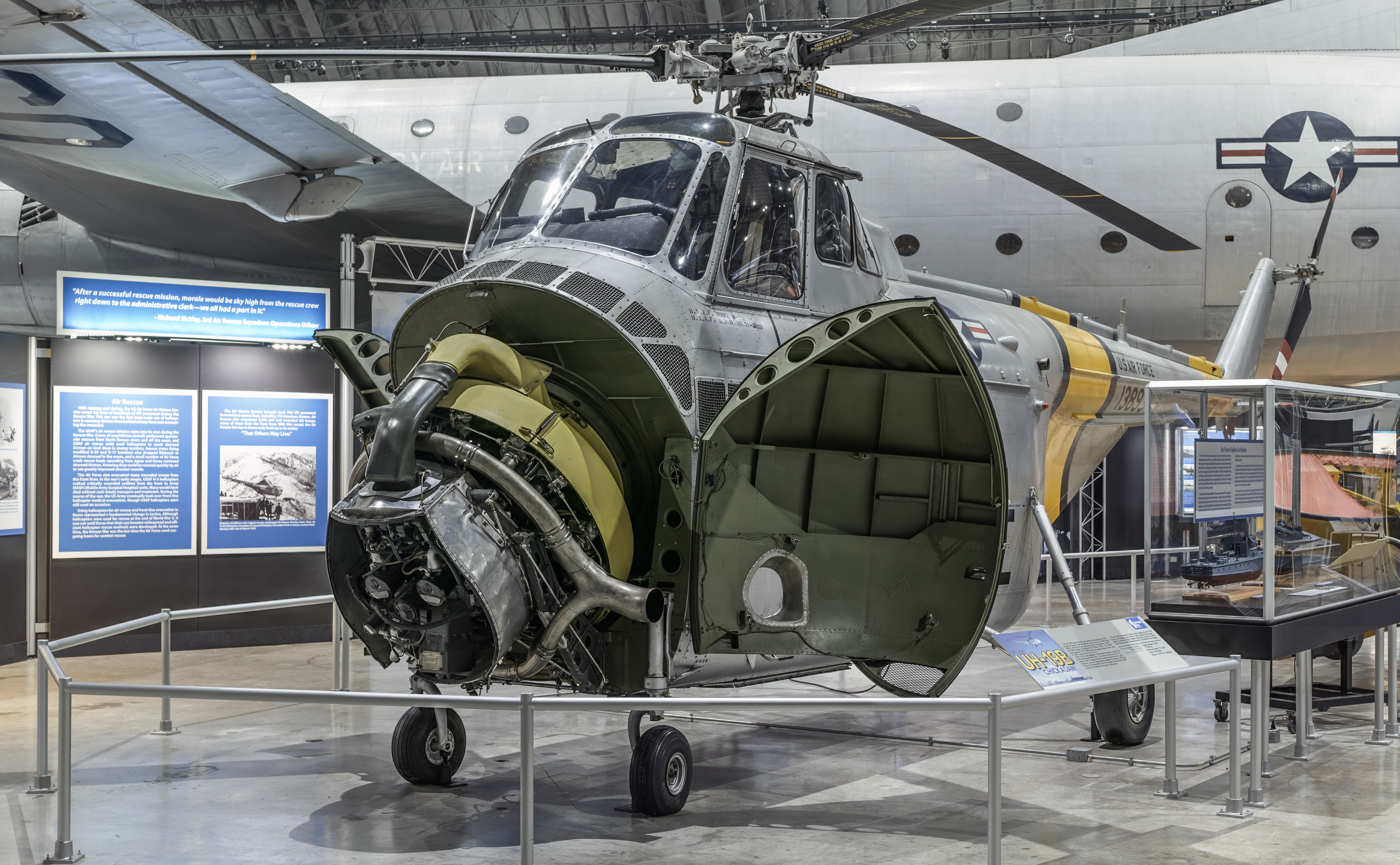
Front three-quarter view of the Sikorsky H-19B Chickasaw helicopter at the National Museum of the United States Air Force showing the engine

Major innovations implemented on the H-19 were the forward placement of the engine below the crew compartment and in front of the main cabin, the use of offset flapping hinges located nine inches (230 mm) from the center of the rotor, and the use of hydraulic servos for the main rotor controls. These features yielded an aircraft that was far more capable in a transport role than previous Sikorsky designs.

The forward engine location placed the main cabin essentially in line with the main rotor's rotational axis and close to the aircraft center of gravity, making it easier to maintain proper weight and balance under differing loading conditions. The impetus for this design choice was the recent rejection of the Sikorsky XHJS by the U.S. Navy in favor of the tandem rotor Piasecki HUP Retriever; the Navy had strongly objected to the necessity to use ballast in the cabin-forward XHJS to maintain proper weight and balance, prompting Sikorsky to seek single-rotor design alternatives that did not require this.

Another benefit of this engine location was ease of maintenance, as the engine could be readily accessed at ground level through dual clamshell-style doors; the entire engine could be changed in only two hours, and the radial engine was oriented backwards relative to a typical airplane installation, allowing more convenient access to engine accessories. (Note: The accessories for a radial engine were traditionally located on the side of the engine opposite the crankshaft; in a prop-powered airplane that used the more commonplace tractor configuration, the accessories were typically buried inside a cowling or nacelle, resulting in less convenient access than the reversed orientation used in the H-19.)

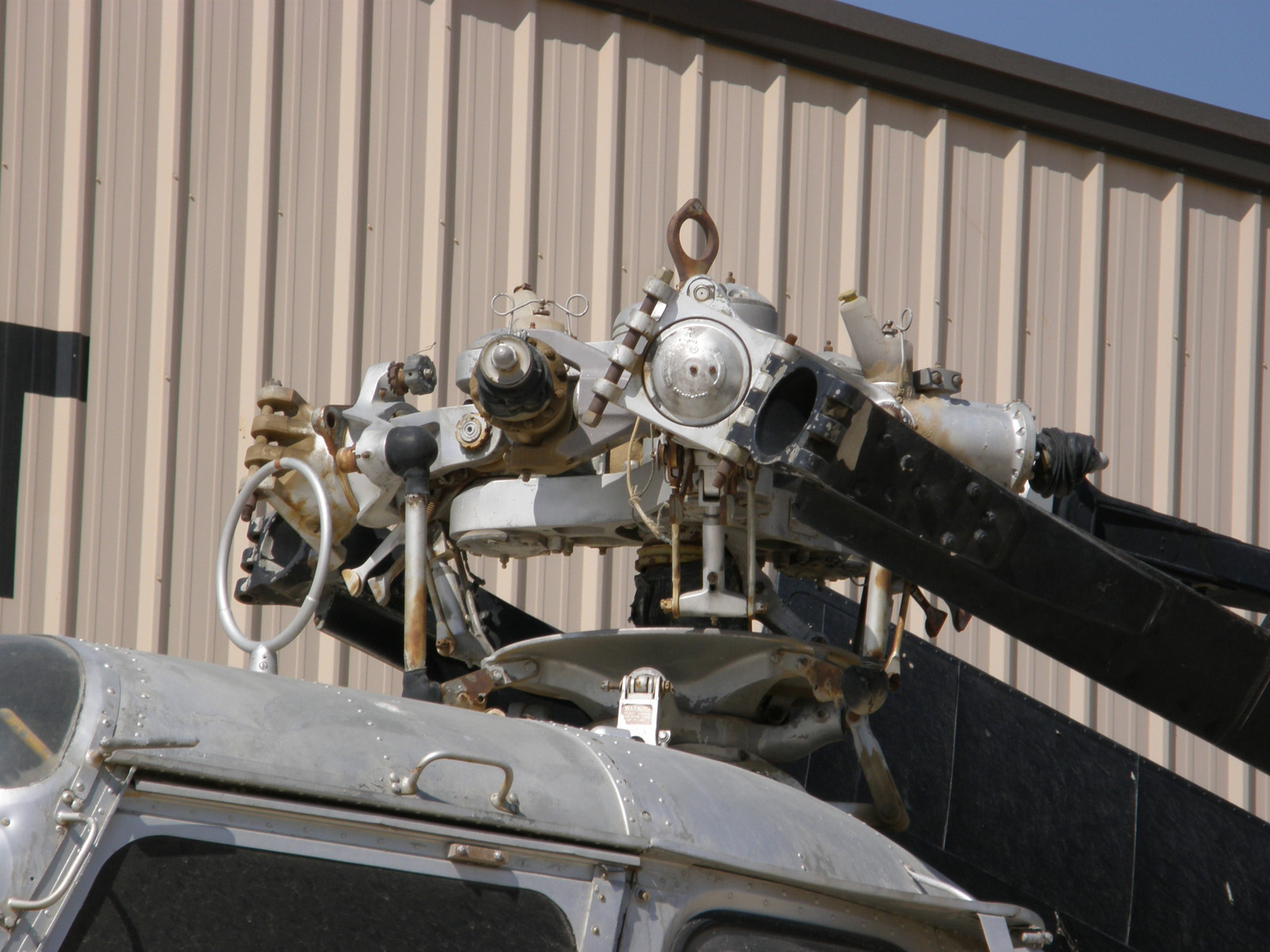
UH-19B rotor head, with main rotors folded

The offset flapping hinges and hydraulic servos gave more positive flight control under differing loading conditions, isolated the flight controls from vibration, and lessened control forces; the H-19 could be flown with only two fingers on the cyclic control.

The YH-19 prototypes featured a blunt aft fuselage and a single starboard-mounted horizontal tailplane with a small vertical fin at its outboard end. Initial production models added a large fillet-like fin behind the fuselage and under the tailboom, and the tailplane configuration was changed to an inverted "V" shape.

Early H-19 and HO4S variants were powered by a Pratt & Whitney R-1340-57 radial rated at 600 hp (450 kW) and used a centrifugal clutch that automatically engaged the main rotor when a preset engine speed was reached. However, the HO4S was deemed underpowered in U.S. Navy service with this powerplant, so the aircraft was re-engined with a 700 hp (520 kW) Wright R-1300-3 radial which the U.S. Navy found to be adequate in an air–sea rescue role; the H-19B, HO4S-3, HRS-3, and subsequent models would use this powerplant. The R-1300 models also used a single horizontal tailplane in place of the early inverted "V" style, and a new hydro-mechanical clutch gave smoother and more rapid rotor acceleration during clutch engagement and allowed the engine to be started and operated at any speed while disengaged from the transmission and rotors.

Early civilian and military S-55 models offered a folding 400-pound (180 kg) capacity hoist above the starboard main cabin door, while later models could be equipped with a more capable and reliable 600-pound (270 kg) capacity unit. Starting with the introduction of the S-55C in October 1956, the tailboom was inclined three degrees downward to provide more main rotor clearance during hard landings; models equipped with the inclined tail also used an 8-foot-9-inch (2.67 m) tail rotor in place of the earlier 8-foot-8-inch (2.64 m) unit.

== Operational history ==
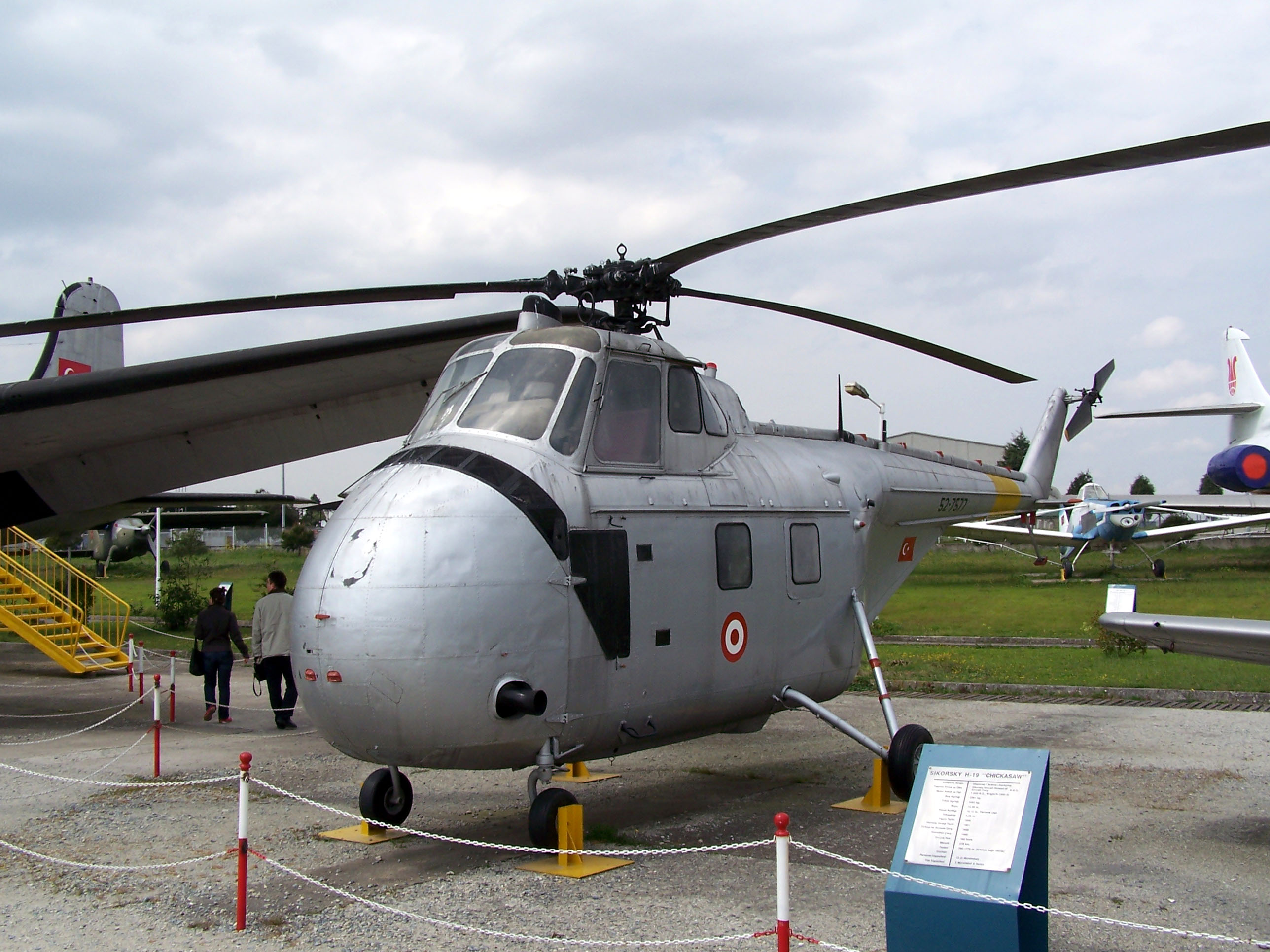
Sikorsky H-19 Chickasaw in Istanbul Aviation Museum (İstanbul Havacılık Müzesi), Istanbul, Turkey, with downward-inclined tailboom typical of later models

The H-19 Chickasaw holds the distinction of being the U.S. Army's first true transport helicopter and, as such, played an important role in the initial formulation of Army doctrine regarding air mobility and the battlefield employment of troop-carrying helicopters. The H-19 underwent live service tests in the hands of the 6th Transportation Company, during the Korean War beginning in 1951 as an unarmed transport helicopter. Undergoing tests such as medical evacuation, tactical control and frontline cargo support, the helicopter succeeded admirably in surpassing the capabilities of the H-5 Dragonfly which had been used throughout the war by the Army.

The U.S. Marine Corps (USMC) made extensive use of the H-19 in the Korean War. It was designated as the HRS in USMC service. Marine Squadron HMR-161 arrived in Korea on 2 September 1951 with 15 HRS-1 helicopters. The new helicopter squadron started operations upon arrival. On 13 September 1951, during Operation Windmill I, HMR-161 transported 18,848 pounds (8.5 t) of gear and 74 Marines onto a ridge in the Punchbowl area. A week later HMR-161 shuttled 224 recon company marines and 17,772 pounds (8.1 t) of supplies to a remote hilltop in the same area. Their performance continued to improve and in Operation Haylift II on 23–27 February 1953, HMR-161 lifted 1.6 million pounds (730 t) of cargo to resupply two regiments. Although HMR-161 helicopters were operating in "hot" landing zones near enemy troops, they did not lose any helicopters to enemy fire. HRS-1 helicopters were also used to relocate rocket launcher batteries; the rockets created a dust cloud when fired, making the launcher a target for counter-battery fire, so launchers and crews were moved twice a day. Each HRS-1 helicopter carried four rocket launchers and extra rockets as external cargo, with the crew in the cabin. The HRS-1 helicopter proved to be durable and reliable in Korean service. One reportedly flew home after losing 18 in (46 cm) of main rotor blade to a tree. HMR-161 reported 90% aircraft availability.

The success of helicopter operations with the USMC prompted the service to seek a military light utility vehicle that the HRS could lift, leading to the development of the aluminum-bodied, 1,700 lb (770 kg) M422 Mighty Mite in the early 1950s. However, developmental issues delayed deployment of the M422 until 1959, by which time the HRS was being replaced by utility helicopters capable of lifting standard U.S. light utility vehicles, rendering the M422 unnecessary and – due to its unique design – a supply chain liability. The Mighty Mite was only produced in small numbers and was mostly withdrawn from service by the late 1960s.

The U.S. Air Force (USAF) ordered 50 H-19A's for rescue duties in 1951. These aircraft were the primary rescue and medical evacuation helicopters for the USAF during the Korean War. The Air Force continued to use the H-19 through the 1960s, ultimately acquiring 270 of the H-19B model.

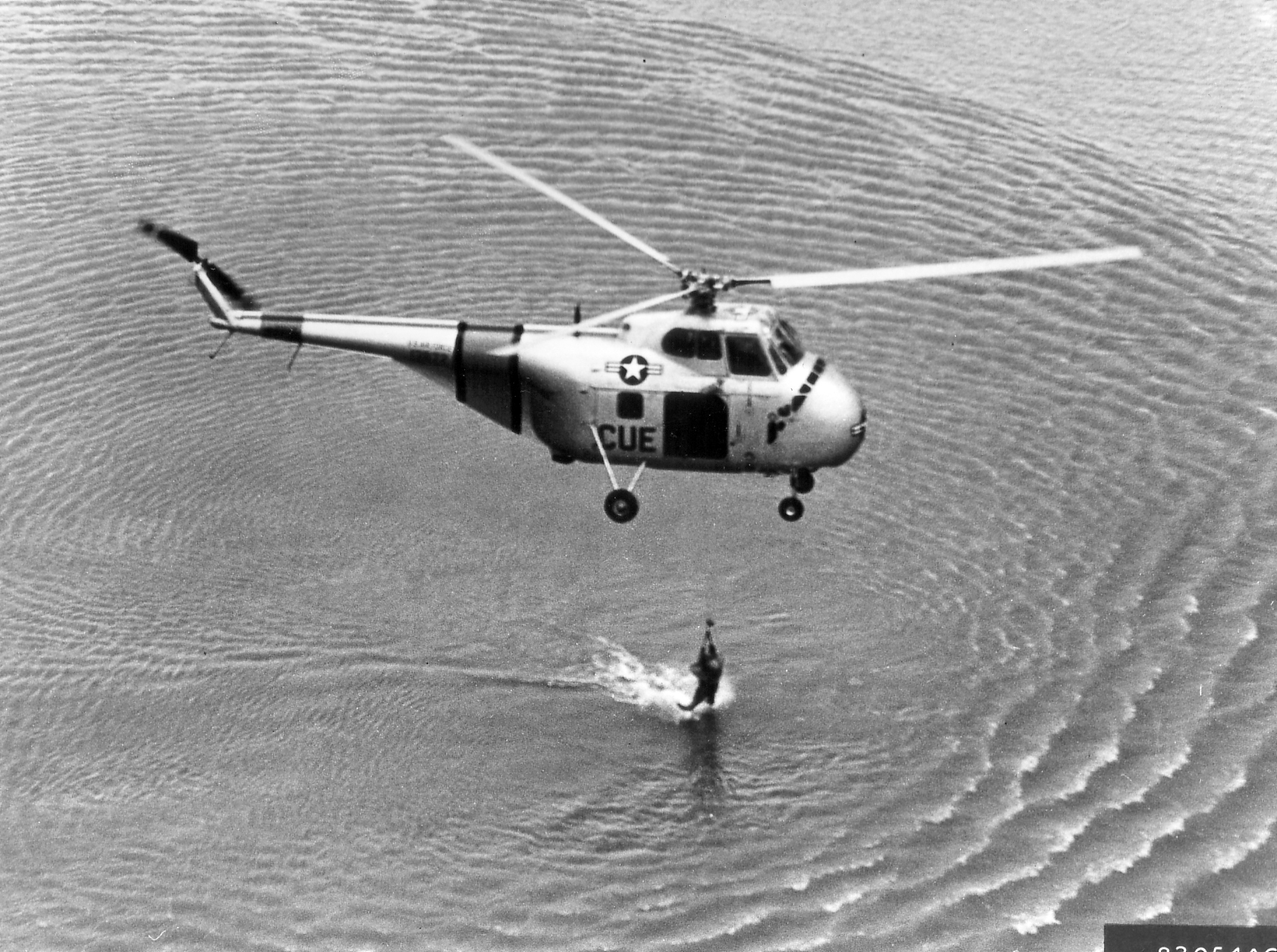
USAF HH-19 in a publicity photo purported to show the rescue of U.S. F-86 ace Joseph C. McConnell; the actual rescue was conducted using a different H-19.

A notable rescue involving a USAF H-19 occurred on 12 April 1953 when a North American F-86 Sabre flown by leading American flying ace Joseph C. McConnell was riddled with cannon fire from an enemy MiG-15 during a patrol over MiG Alley. McConnell was able to turn and shoot down the attacking MiG, but his F-86 was badly damaged and began losing engine power. Realizing he could not make it back to base, McConnell headed for the USAF rescue base at Cho-do, spotting an H-19 below him. H-19 pilots Joe Sullivan and Don Crabb, alerted that two damaged Sabres were headed towards them, saw McConnell's F-86 and changed course to parallel it. McConnell ejected over the Yellow Sea near the helicopter and was pulled from the water within two minutes by H-19 medic Arthur Gillespie; McConnell later told his sister "I barely got wet." Seeking favorable publicity for its ace pilots in Korea, the USAF circulated a rescue photo which was widely published in U.S. newspapers; however, Sullivan, Crabb, and Gillespie were flying a different H-19 without rescue markings that day. Historian Kenneth P. Werrell writes that the misleading, staged photo was likely a ruse to conceal the fact that the H-19 was not originally on an air rescue mission but was instead supporting special operations in the Cho-do area.

On 1 September 1953, Sabena used the S-55 to inaugurate the first commercial helicopter service in Europe, with routes between Rotterdam and Maastricht in the Netherlands and Cologne and Bonn in West Germany.

France made aggressive use of helicopters in Algeria, both as troop transports and gunships. Piasecki H-21 and Sud-built Sikorsky H-34 helicopters rapidly displaced fixed-wing aircraft for the transport of paras and quick-reaction commando teams. In Indochina, a small number of Hiller H-23s and H-19s were available for casualty evacuation. In 1956, the French Air Force experimented with arming the H-19, then being superseded in service by the more capable H-21 and H-34. The H-19 was originally fitted with a 20mm cannon, two rocket launchers, two 12.7mm machine guns, and a 7.5mm light machine gun firing from the cabin windows, but this load proved far too heavy, and even lightly armed H-19 gunships fitted with flexible machine guns for self-defense proved underpowered.

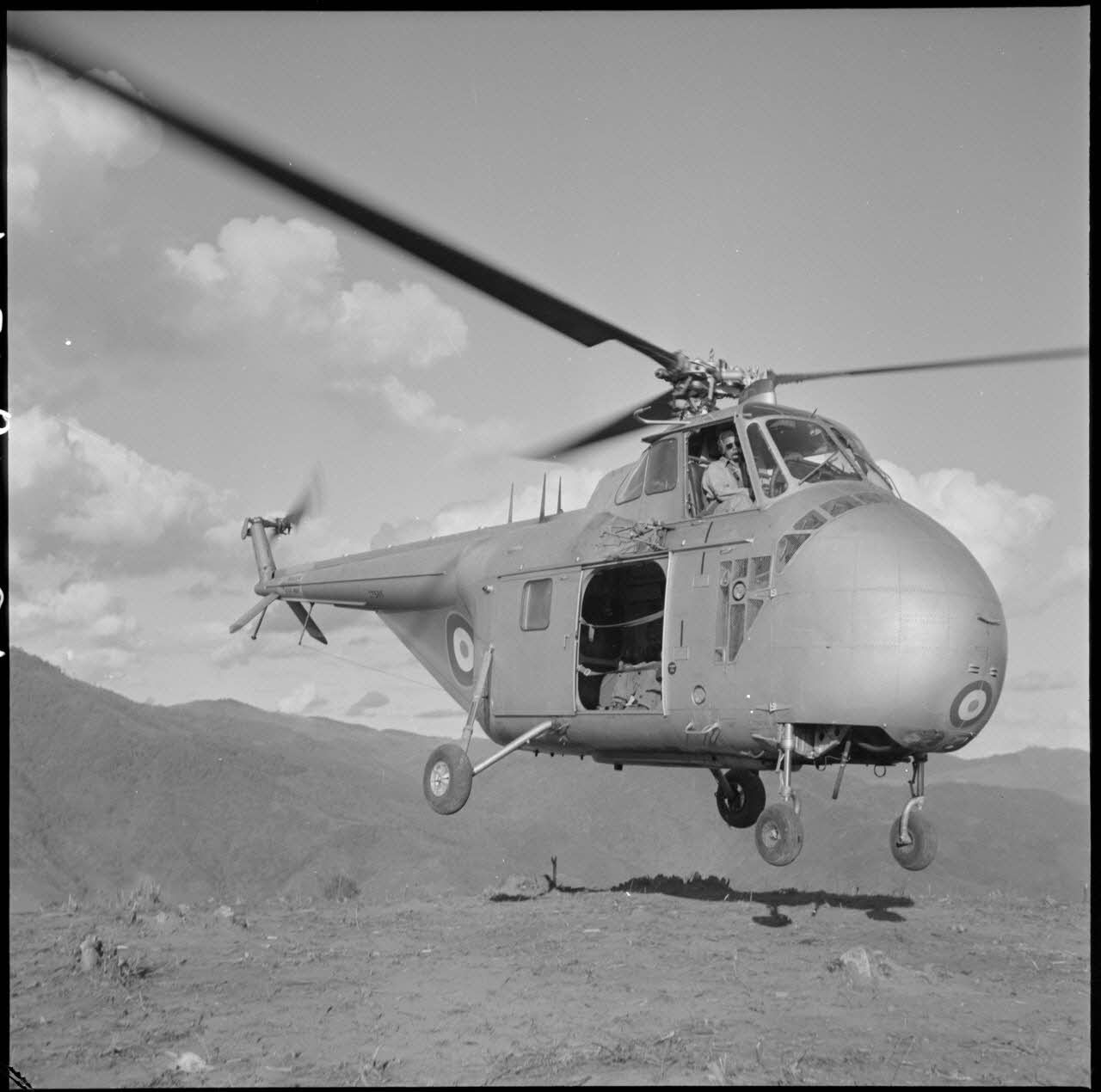
French Sikorsky H-19 helicopter taking off from a forward operating base during the Indochina war

The H-19 was also used by the French forces in the First Indochina War. A small number of war-worn H-19s were given to the Republic of Vietnam Air Force in 1958, when the French military departed. These saw very limited service in the early days of the Vietnam War, before being supplanted by the more capable H-34.

Pakistan ordered eight S-55s in 1956 to equip search and rescue squadrons of the Pakistan Air Force. They saw service during the 1965 Indo-Pakistani War, flying various missions including counterintelligence operations at Karachi in co-operation with the Army. They were retired from service in 1971.

The H-19 left U.S. military service when the CH-19E was retired by U.S. Navy squadron HC-5 on 26 February 1969. Surplus H-19s were sold on the open market, and civil interest was sufficient that Sikorsky (and later Orlando Helicopter Airways or OHA) offered conversion kits allowing a military surplus H-19 to be commercially operated under a standard Federal Aviation Administration type certificate as an S-55B. (Note: Military aircraft typically do not receive type certificates and thus cannot lawfully be operated commercially, except in certain special cases, such as a civil transport being adopted for military service without significant modifications.) Turboshaft conversions were also offered by aftermarket modification companies.

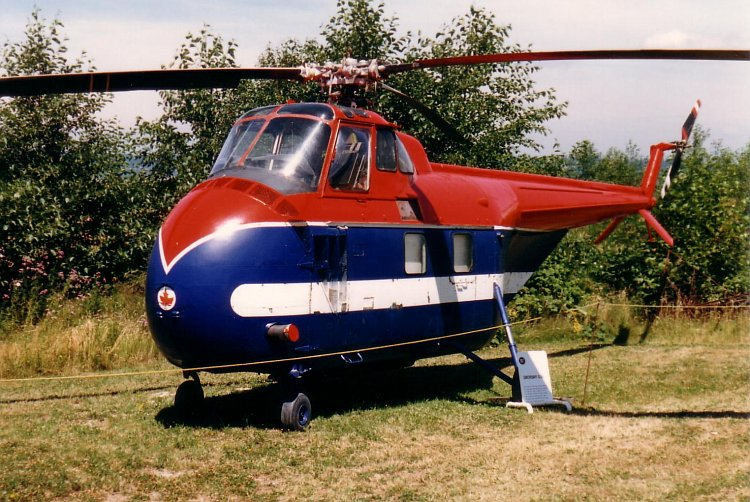
Sikorsky UH-19 at the Canadian Museum of Flight in 1988, painted as it would have looked while working on the construction of the Mid-Canada Line. This aircraft has the early-style straight tailboom.

A novel civil conversion of the H-19 by OHA was the Heli-Camper, a campervan-like conversion—featuring a built-in mini-kitchen and sleeping accommodations for four. In the late 1970s, OHA participated in a joint effort with popular American recreational vehicle (RV) manufacturer Winnebago Industries to market the aircraft, now renamed the Winnebago Heli-Home. A larger version based on the Sikorsky S-58 was also developed, and optional floats were offered for amphibious operations. The aircraft were featured in several American popular magazines and reportedly drew large crowds at RV shows and dealerships, but their high purchase price together with rising 1970s fuel prices resulted in very limited sales; production is not well documented, but is estimated at only six or seven of the S-55 and S-58 versions combined.

In the mid-1980s, the U.S. Army sought an economical helicopter to simulate the sound and radar signature of the Soviet Mil Mi-24 during exercises. OHA sold the Army fifteen modified S-55/Mi-24s with a new five-bladed rotor system, which was quieter than the original three-bladed rotor and made the aircraft sound similar to an Mi-24. The piston engines and original Sikorsky tail rotors were retained.

OHA also produced the S-55QT Whisper Jet, an extra-quiet civil conversion based on the five-bladed S-55/Mi-24, but using an 840 horsepower (630 kW) Garrett TPE331 derated to 650 horsepower (480 kW) from the S-55T, which lowered the aircraft's empty weight by 900 pounds (410 kg). The aircraft were also outfitted with special intake and exhaust silencers, carbon fiber noise-absorbing engine compartment doors, and a transparent Plexiglas floor. Five aircraft were built in 1999 to comply with strict National Park Service noise limits for Grand Canyon aerial tours; however, the aircraft were only used in this role for two years because it was difficult for pilots in the high-mounted cockpit to communicate with tourists in the main cabin. After being retired from sightseeing, the helicopters were used in utility and lift roles.

== Variants ==
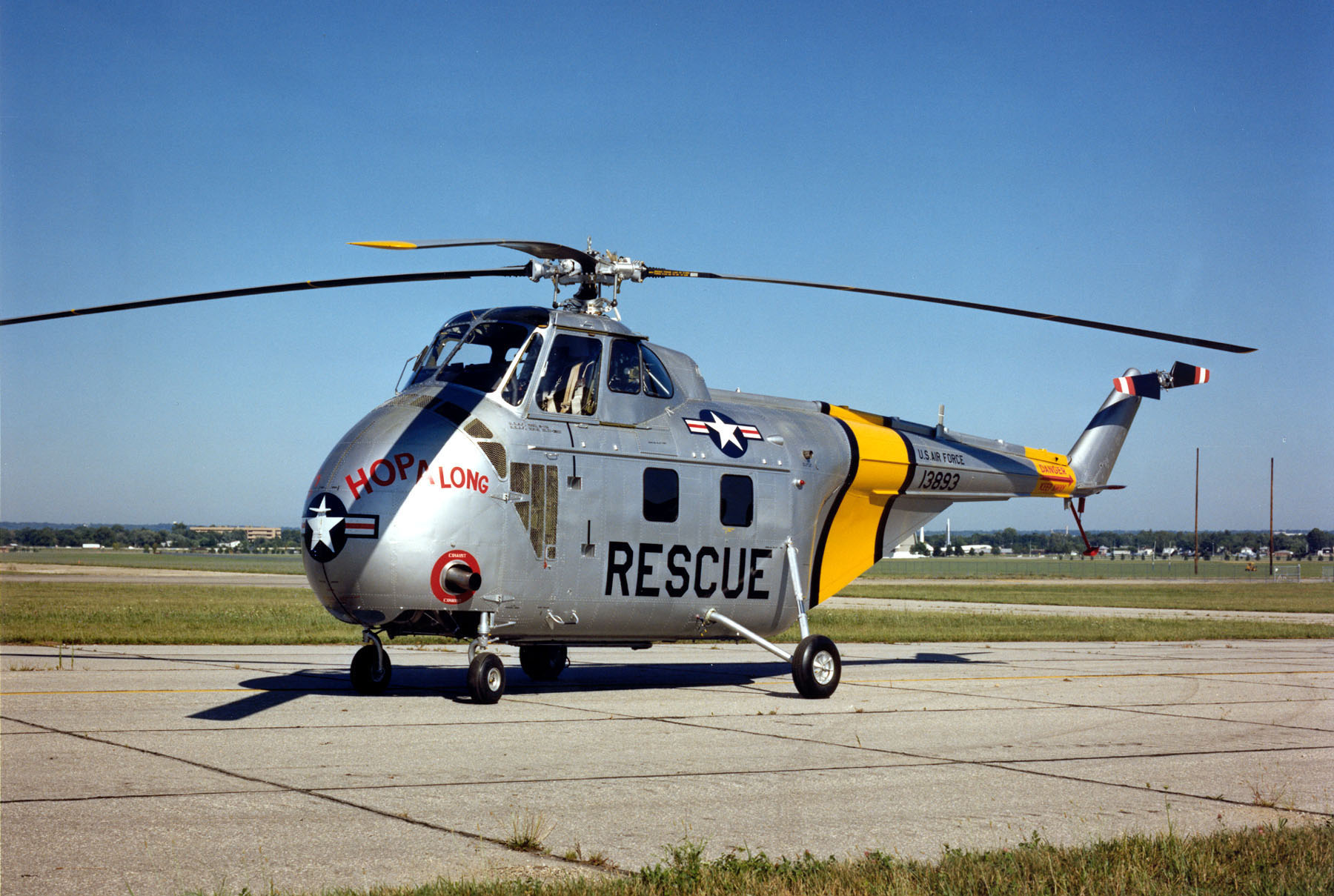
UH-19B, USAF Museum

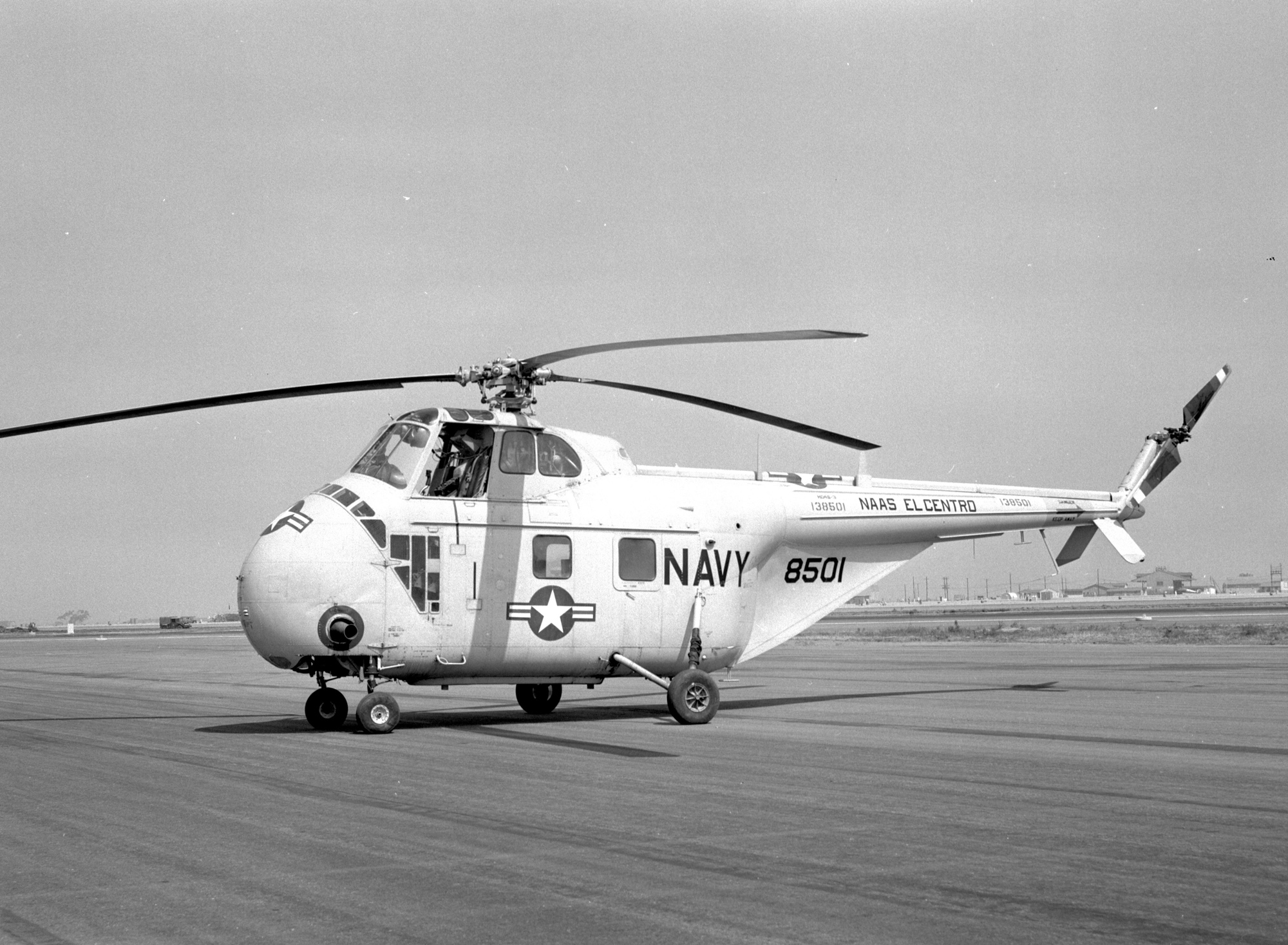
A U.S. Navy HO4S stationed at NAF El Centro. Inverted "V" tailplane is typical of early models with R-1340 engine.

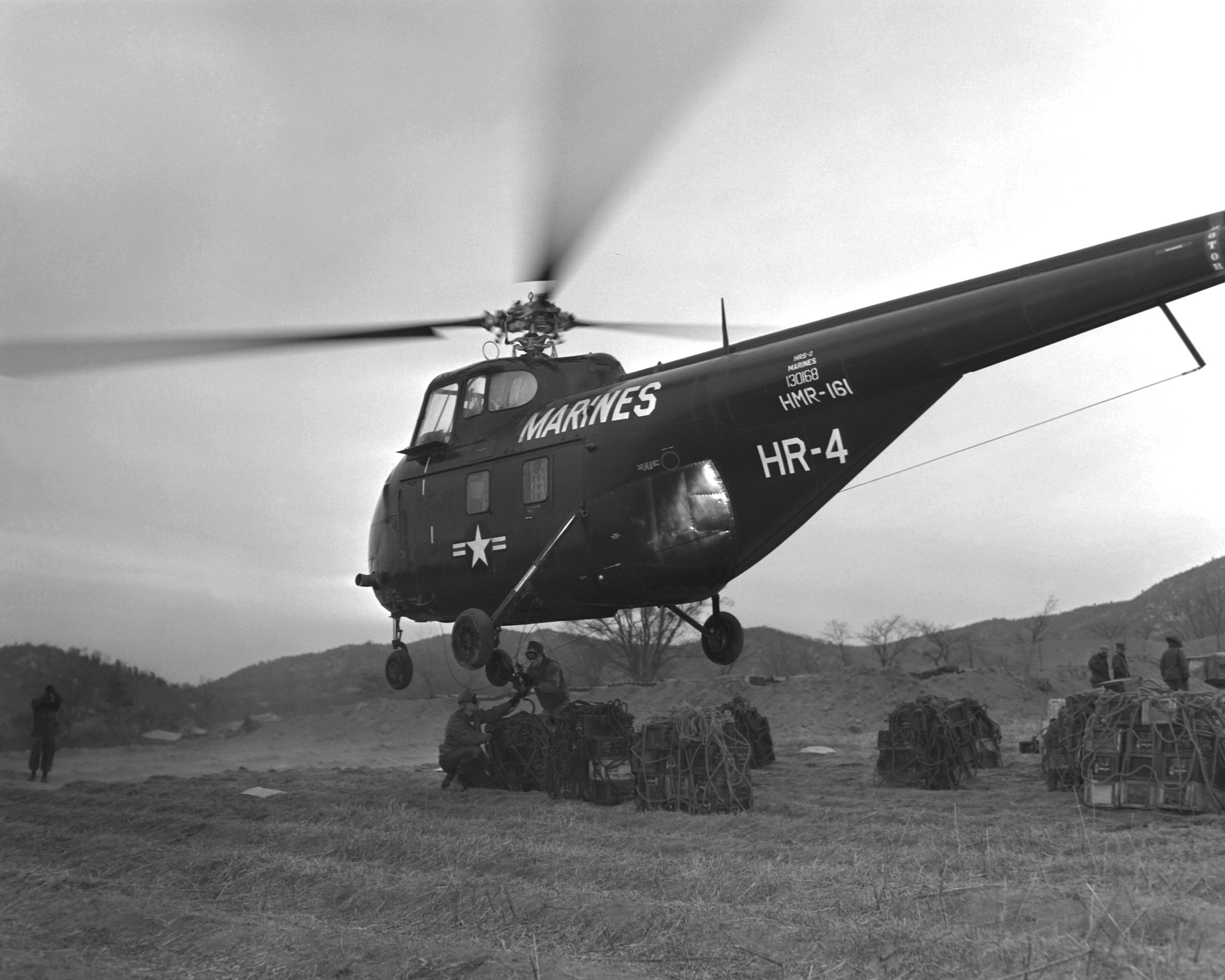
A USMC HRS-2 of HMR-161 in Korea, 1953

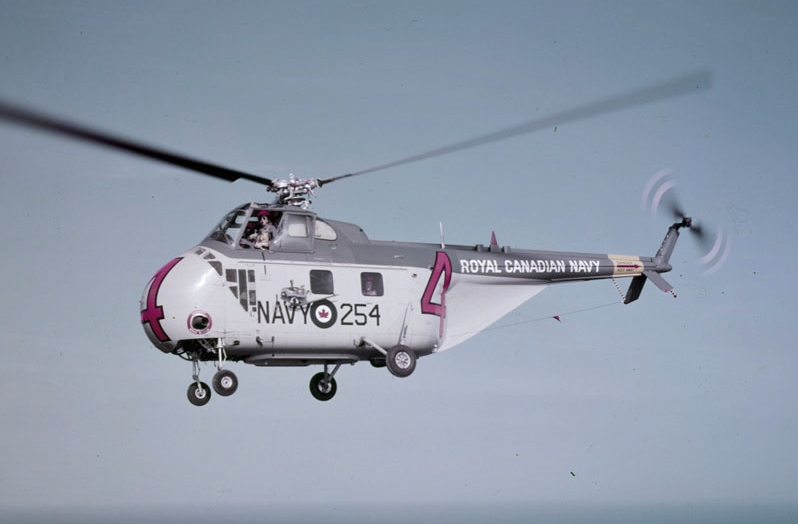
An HO4S of the Royal Canadian Navy

=== Pre-1962 USAF designations ===
YH-19
Five early production S-55s for evaluation
H-19A
USAF version of the YH-19 powered by a 600 hp (450 kW) R-1340-57 engine, redesignated UH-19A in 1962, 50 built.
SH-19A
H-19As modified for air-sea rescue, redesignated HH-19A in 1962.
H-19B
H-19A with a more powerful 700 hp (520 kW) R-1300-3 engine, redesignated UH-19B in 1962, 264 built.
SH-19B
H-19Bs modified for air-sea rescue, redesignated HH-19B in 1962.
H-19C
U.S. Army version of the H-19A, redesignated UH-19C in 1962, 72 built.

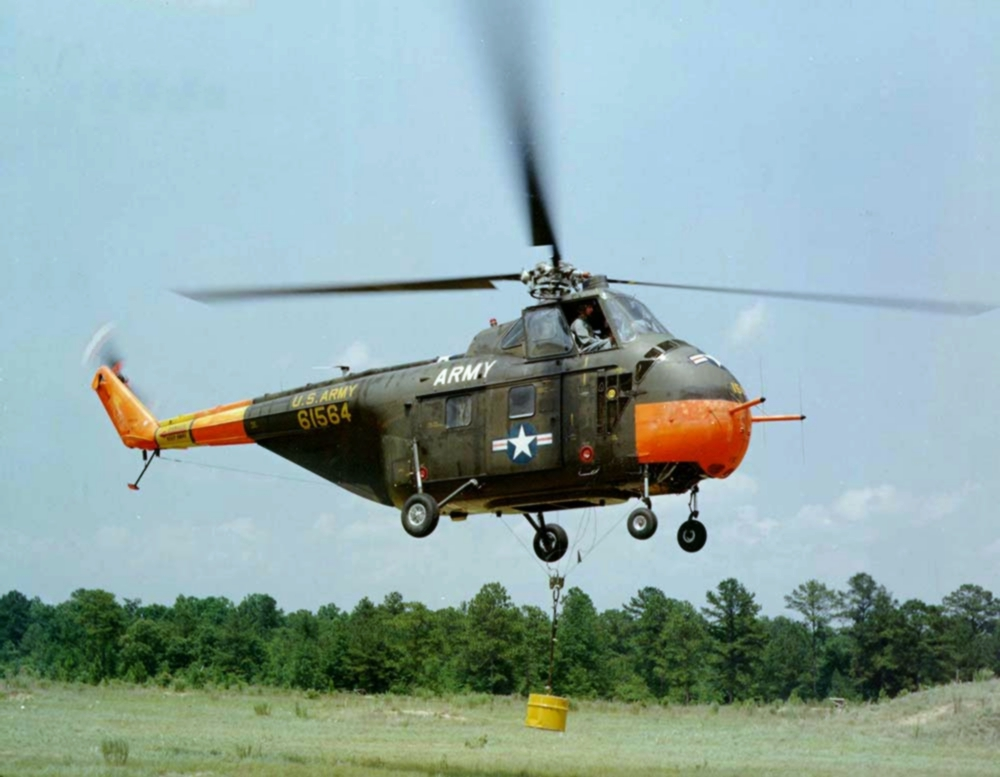
H-19D (S-55) of the U.S. Army

H-19D
U.S. Army version of the H-19B, redesignated UH-19D in 1962, 301 built.

=== Pre-1962 US Navy, Marine Corps and Coast Guard designations ===
HO4S-1
US Navy version of the H-19A, ten built.
HO4S-2
Air-sea rescue version with R-1340 derated to 550 hp (410 kW), three built for Royal Canadian Navy (RCN), both surviving aircraft subsequently converted to HO4S-3.
HO4S-2G
US Coast Guard version of HO4S-2, seven built.
HO4S-3
Re-engined US Navy and RCN air-sea rescue version with 700 hp (520 kW) Wright R-1300-3 engine, 79 built.
HO4S-3G
US Coast Guard version of HO4S-3, 30 built.
HRS-1
US Marine Corps version of HO4S for eight troops, 600 hp (450 kW) R-1340-57 engine, 60 built.
HRS-2
HRS-1 with equipment changes, 101 built.
HRS-3
HRS-2 with 700 hp (520 kW) R-1300-3 engine, 105 built and conversions from HRS-2.
HRS-4
Project for HRS-3 with a 1,025 hp (764 kW) R-1820 radial engine, not built.

=== Post-1962 Tri-Service designations ===
UH-19A
H-19A redesignated in 1962.
HH-19A
SH-19A redesignated in 1962.
UH-19B
H-19B redesignated in 1962.
HH-19B
SH-19B redesignated in 1962.
CH-19E
HRS-3 redesignated in 1962.
UH-19F
US HO4S-3 redesignated in 1962. (RCN/CAF aircraft retained HO4S-3 designation.)
HH-19G
HO4S-3G redesignated in 1962.

=== Royal Navy designations ===
Whirlwind HAR21
HRS-2 for Royal Navy, ten delivered.
Whirlwind HAS22
HO4S-3 for Royal Navy, 15 delivered. Later marks of Whirlwind were built under licence.

=== Thai designations ===
H.3
(Thai: ฮ.๓) Royal Thai Armed Forces designation for the S-55.

=== Civil variants ===
S-55
Commercial version with 600 hp (450 kW) R-1340 engine.
S-55A
Commercial version with 800 hp (600 kW) R-1300-3 engine.
S-55B
New designation given to civilian kit conversions of military surplus H-19s with R-1300-3 engine.
S-55C
S-55A with a 600 hp (450 kW) R-1340 engine.
S-55T
Aircraft modified by Aviation Specialties and produced and marketed by Helitec with a 650 hp (480 kW) Garrett AiResearch TPE-331-3U-303 turboshaft and updated equipment.
S-55/Mi-24
Orlando Helicopter Airways (OHA) conversion for U.S. Army to simulate the Mil Mi-24. Used newly-designed five-bladed rotor assembly with piston engine. Fifteen converted.
S-55QT
OHA conversion. Ultra-quiet helicopter for sightseeing flights over the Grand Canyon. S-55T with five-bladed rotor from S-55/Mi-24 and additional sound-reducing equipment. Five converted.
OHA-S-55 Heli-Camper/Winnebago Heli-Home
OHA conversion marketed by Winnebago.
OHA-S-55 Nite-Writer
Commercial conversion. Aerial advertising helicopter, fitted with a 12.2 m × (40 ft × 8 ft) array of computer-controlled lights.
OHA-S-55 Bearcat
Commercial conversion. Agricultural helicopter.
OHA-S-55 Heavy Lift
Commercial conversion. Flying crane helicopter.
QS-55 Aggressors
Commercial conversion. S-55 helicopters converted into flying targets.
OHA-AT-55 Defender
Commercial conversion. Armed military helicopter.
VAT Elite
Highly modified S-55 from Vertical Aircraft Technologies Inc., powered by a 522 kW (700 hp) Garret TSE311 driving a 5-bladed rotor.

== Operators ==
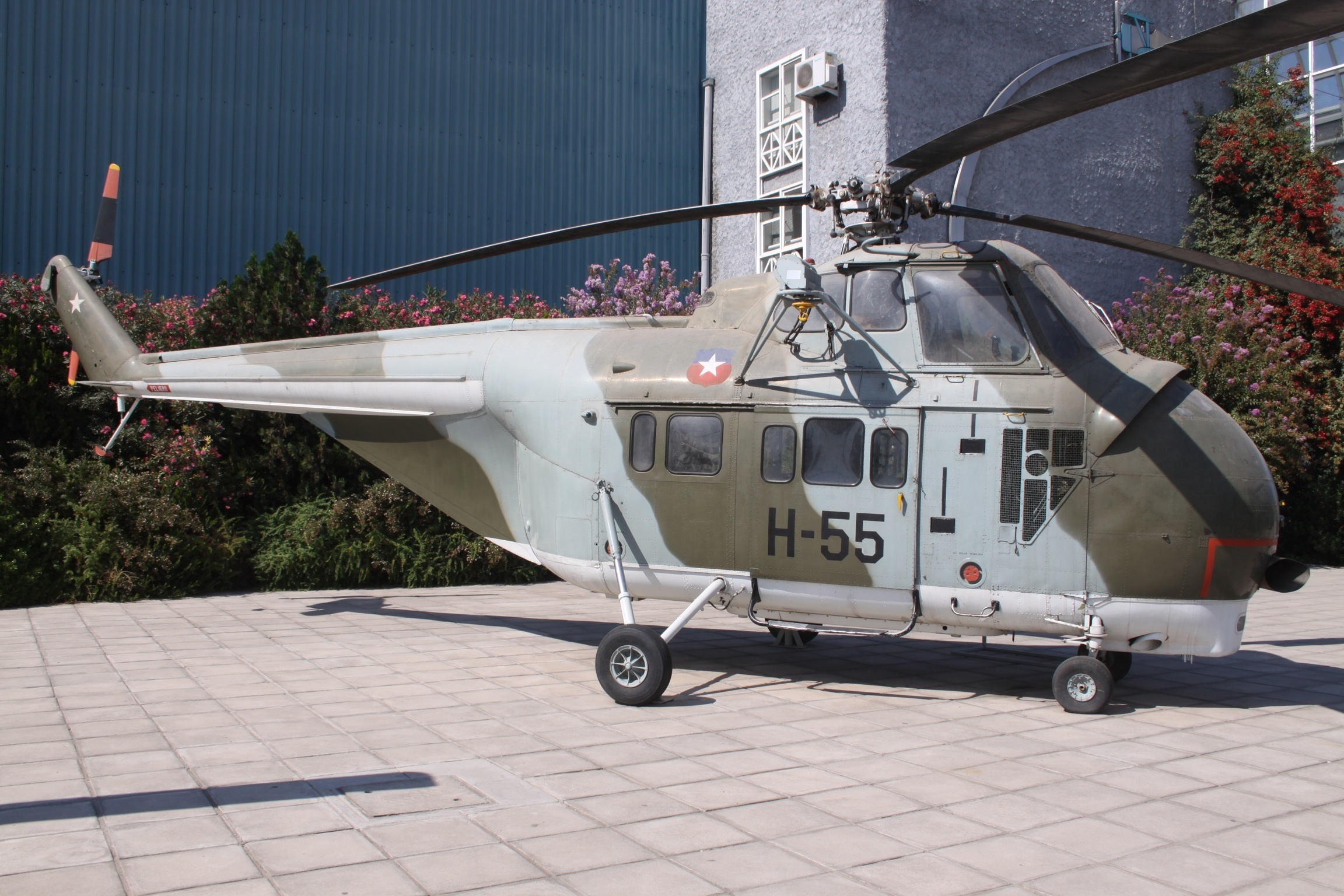
S-55 of the Air Force of Chile on display at a museum

== Notable accidents ==
- 17 January 1975 – In what remains the deadliest helicopter accident in Icelandic history, an S-55B crashed in Hvalfjörður, Iceland due to severe winds, killing all five passengers and both crewmembers on board.

== Aircraft on display ==
See Westland Whirlwind museum examples for examples of the British license-built S-55.

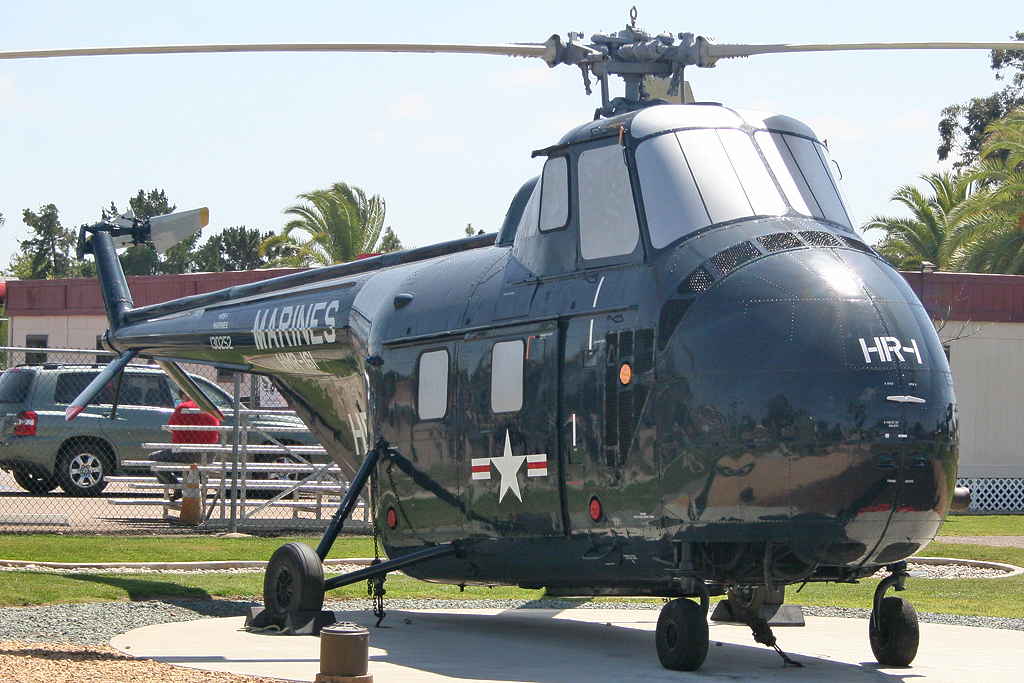
Sikorsky HRS-3, later renamed the CH-19E, of the US Marine Corps at museum

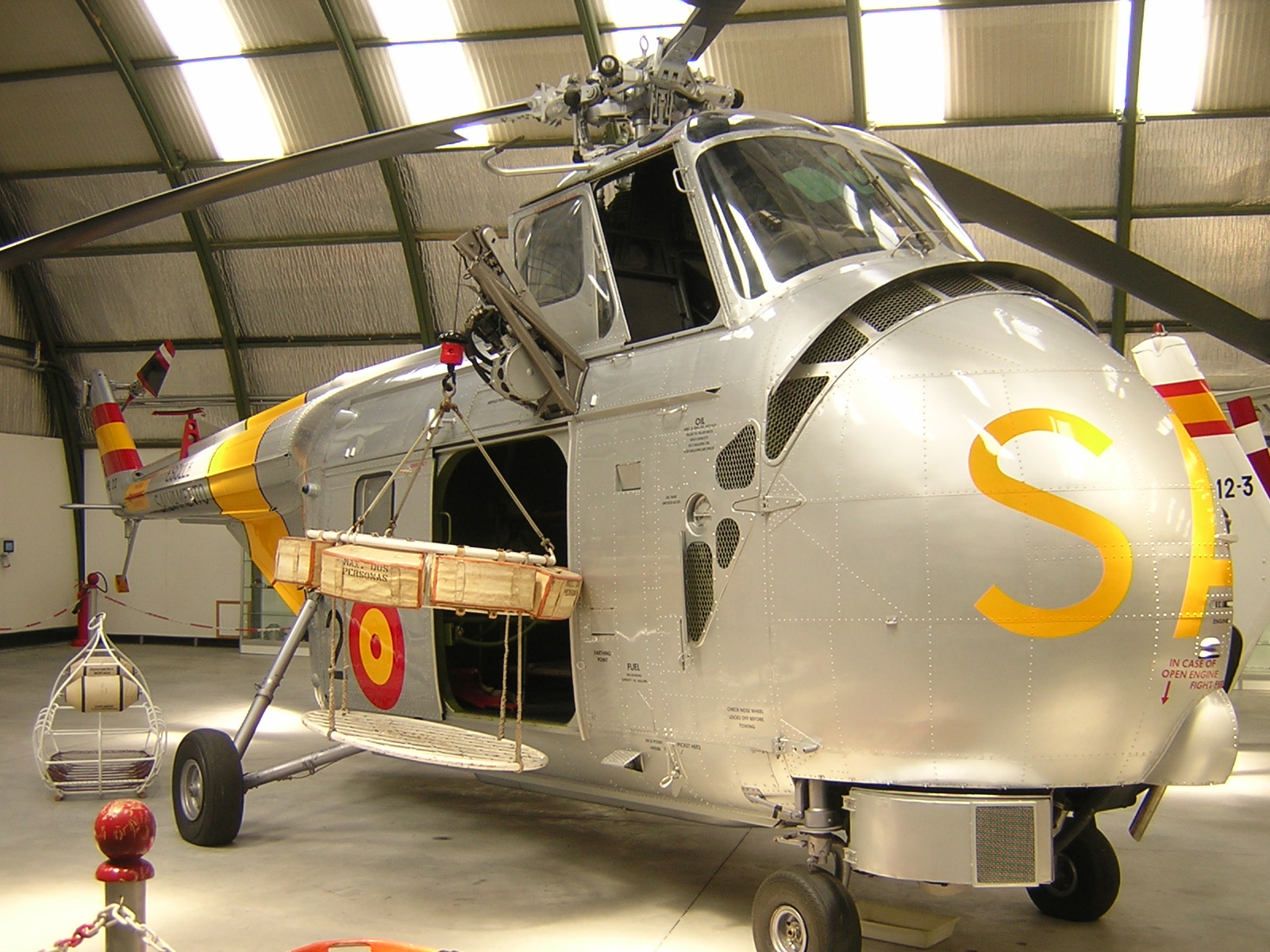
S-55 of Spain

Argentina

- H-04 – S-55 on display at the Museo Nacional de Aeronáutica de Argentina in Morón, Buenos Aires.
- 0371/55-633 – S-55 on display at the Museo de la Aviacion Naval in Bahia Blanca, Buenos Aires.

Guatemala

- S-55 on display in the traffic circle at the main gate of Air Force Headquarters, Aeropuerto Internacional La Aurora, Guatemala City.

Canada

- 55822 – S-55 on static display at The Hangar Flight Museum in Calgary, Alberta. It was operated by Associated Airways in Canada's north and is fitted with a 550 hp Pratt & Whitney Wasp R-1340-S1H2 engine.
- 55885 – HO4S-3 on static display at the Shearwater Aviation Museum in Shearwater, Nova Scotia. It is painted in Royal Canadian Navy Sqn. No. 7 colors as used by Anti-Submarine Squadron HS-50 and Utility Squadron HU-21.

Denmark

- S-883 - S-55C C/N 55-1031, on static display at Danmarks Tekniske Museum in Helsingør
- S-884 – S-55C C/N 55-1032, on static display at the Danmarks Flymuseum in Skjern, Ringkøbing-Skjern.

Germany

- 53-4458 – H-19B on static display at the Deutsches Museum in Munich, Bavaria.

India

- IZ1590 – S-55C C/N 55-1077, on static display at the Indian Air Force Museum in Palam, Delhi.

Israel

- 03 – H-19 on static display at the Israeli Air Force Museum in Hatzerim, South District.

Japan

- JG-0001 – H-19C on static display at the Tokorozawa Aviation Museum in Tokorozawa, Saitama.
- 40012 – H-19C in storage at the Kawaguchiko Motor Museum in Narusawa, Yamanashi.

Norway

- 56-4279 – H-19 D-4 on static display at the Norwegian Armed Forces Aircraft Collection in Gardermoen, Akershus.

Portugal

- 9101 – UH-19 at the Museu do Ar on Sintra Air Base near Lisbon.

Serbia

- 11714 – S-55 on static display at the Museum of Aviation in Surčin, Belgrade.

Thailand

- H3-3/97 – Type 3 on display at the Royal Thai Air Force Museum in Bangkok, Bangkok.

Turkey

- 52-7577 – UH-19B on static display at the Istanbul Aviation Museum in Istanbul, Istanbul.

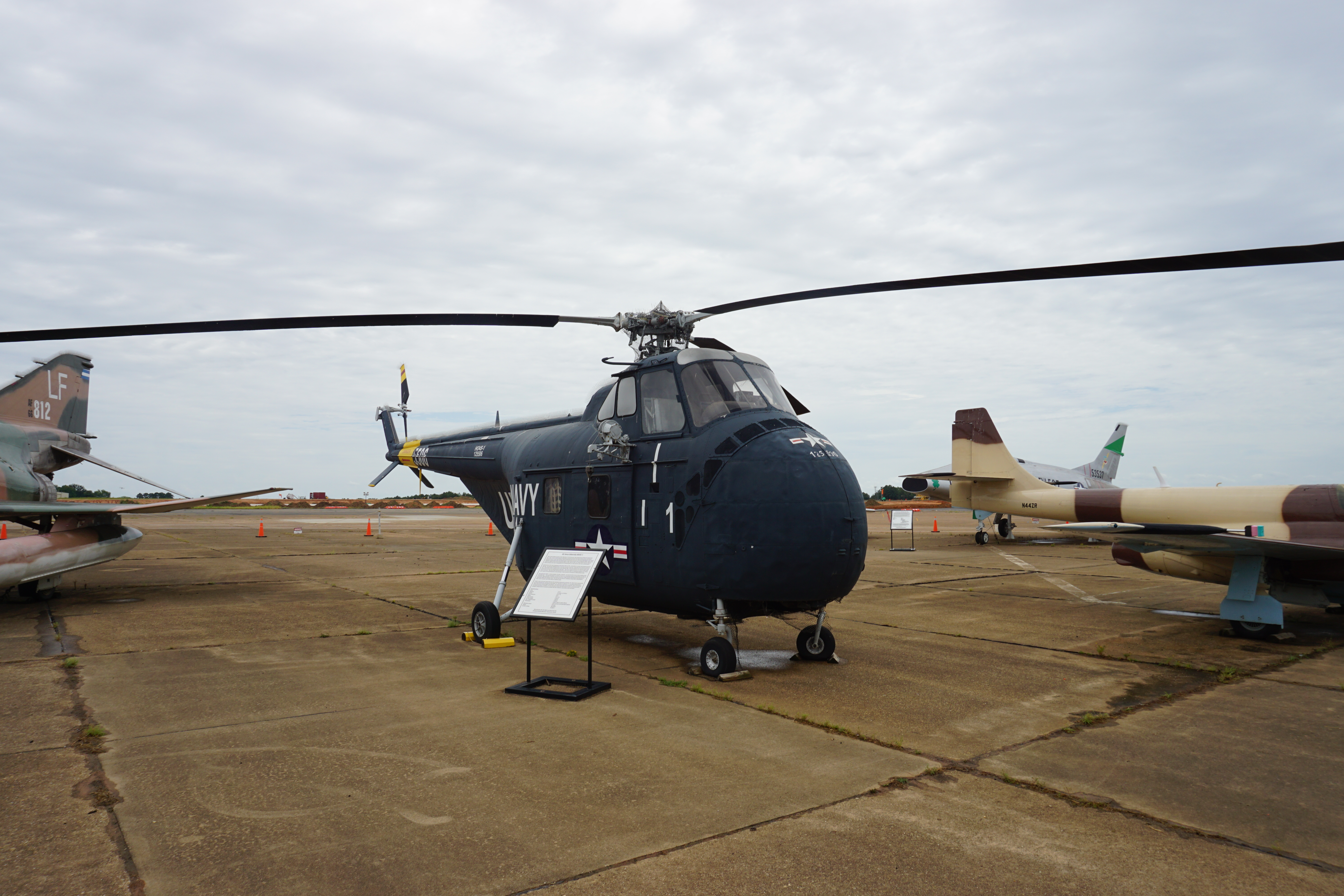
Sikorsky HO4S-1 on display at the Historic Aviation Memorial Museum

United States

- Unknown ID – UH-19F on static display at Kirtland Air Force Base in Albuquerque, New Mexico.
- 130151 – CH-19E on static display at the National Museum of Naval Aviation in Pensacola, Florida. It is displayed in a US Coast Guard paint scheme.
- 130252 – HRS-3 on static display at the Flying Leatherneck Aviation Museum in San Diego, California. It is painted with the unit markings of HMR-161.
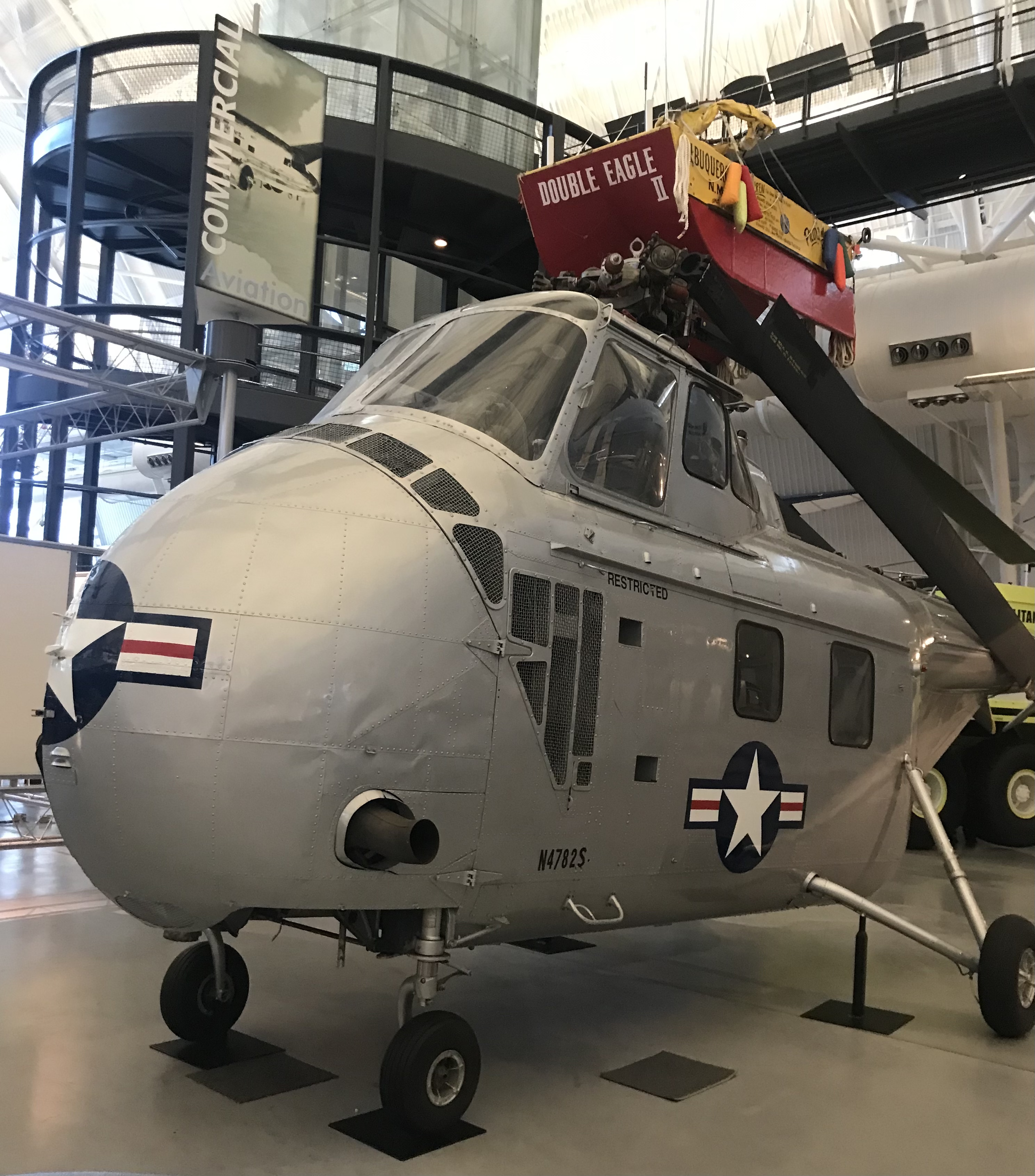
- Sikorsky YH-19A as shown at the Steven F. Udvar-Hazy Center
  49-2012 – YH-19 on static display at the Udvar-Hazy Center of the National Air and Space Museum in Chantilly, Virginia. This airframe was the first S-55 built.
- 52-7537 – UH-19B on static display at the Pima Air and Space Museum in Tucson, Arizona. It is painted as a rescue helicopter with the 534th Air Defense Group.
- 52-7573 - H-19B on static display at the Connecticut Air & Space Center in Stratford, Connecticut.
- 52-7587 – UH-19 on static display at the National Museum of the United States Air Force in Dayton, Ohio. It is painted as Hopalong, one of the helicopters to make the first transatlantic flight.
- 52-7602 – H-19D on static display at the Evergreen Aviation & Space Museum in McMinnville, Oregon. It is painted in U.S. Army scheme.
- 53-4426 – H-19B on static display at the Strategic Air Command & Aerospace Museum in Ashland, Nebraska.
- 55-0433 – H-19D in storage at Fantasy of Flight in Polk City, Florida.
- 55-3221 – H-19D Chickasaw on static display at the United States Army Aviation Museum at Fort Novosel, Alabama.
- 55-4943 – UH-19D on static display at the Estrella Warbird Museum in Paso Robles, California. This airframe had previously been on display at the Museum of Flight in Seattle, Washington.
- 57-5937 – UH-19D on static display at the Valiant Air Command Warbird Museum in Titusville, Florida. It is painted in a USAF rescue scheme. It was previously on display at the EAA AirVenture Museum in Oshkosh, Wisconsin. This aircraft is a former Winnebago Heli-Home.
- 59-4973 – UH-19D on static display at the Camp San Luis Obispo Museum and Historical Site in San Luis Obispo, California.

== Specifications (UH-19C) ==
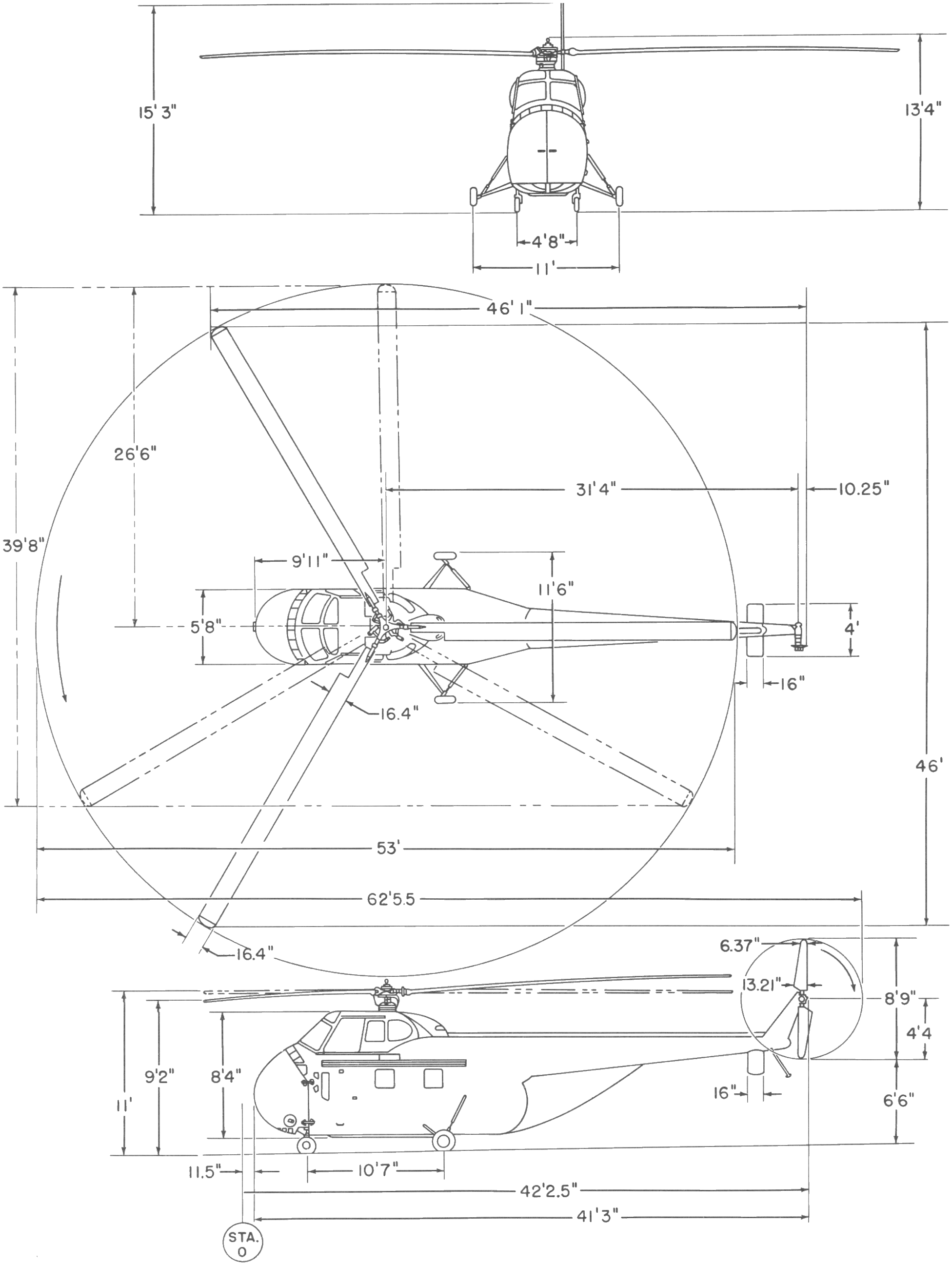
3-view line drawing of the Sikorsky HO4S-2

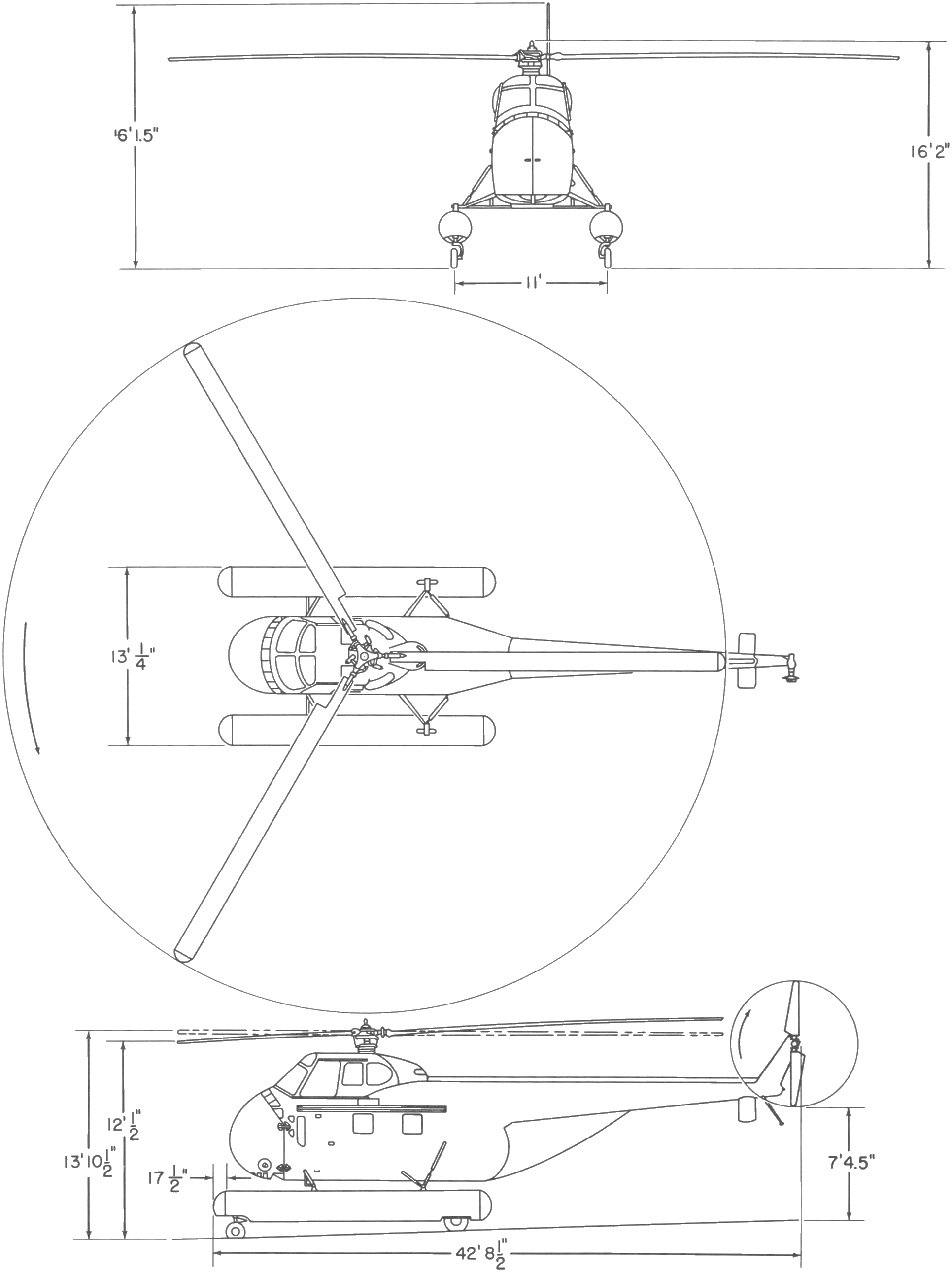
A 3-view line drawing of a Sikorsky H-19A Chickasaw on floats

Data from U.S. Army Aircraft Since 1947

General characteristics

- Crew: 2
- Capacity: ten troops or eight stretchers
- Length: 42 ft 2 in (12.85 m) fuselage length excluding tail and main rotors
- Height: 13 ft 4 in (4.06 m)
- Empty weight: 4,795 lb (2,175 kg)
- Gross weight: 7,500 lb (3,402 kg)
- Powerplant: 1 × Pratt & Whitney R-1340-57 9-cylinder air-cooled radial piston engine, 600 hp (450 kW)
- Main rotor diameter: 53 ft (16 m)
- Main rotor area: 2,206 sq ft (204.9 m^{2})
- Tail rotor diameter: 8 ft 8 in (2.64 m)

Performance

- Maximum speed: 101 mph (163 km/h, 88 kn)
- Cruise speed: 85 mph (137 km/h, 74 kn)
- Range: 450 mi (720 km, 390 nmi)
- Service ceiling: 10,500 ft (3,200 m)

== See also ==
Related development

- Sikorsky H-34 – developed from H-19 (by lengthened airframe and upgrading engines)
- Westland Whirlwind (helicopter) – British licensed version of S-55

Aircraft of comparable role, configuration, and era

- Harbin Z-5 – Chinese variant of Mi-4
- Mil Mi-4 – similar design and built in response to H-19

Related lists

- List of civil aircraft
- List of military aircraft of the United States
- List of rotorcraft
