= Stratford Army Engine Plant =

Coordinates: 41°10′10″N 73°07′19″W

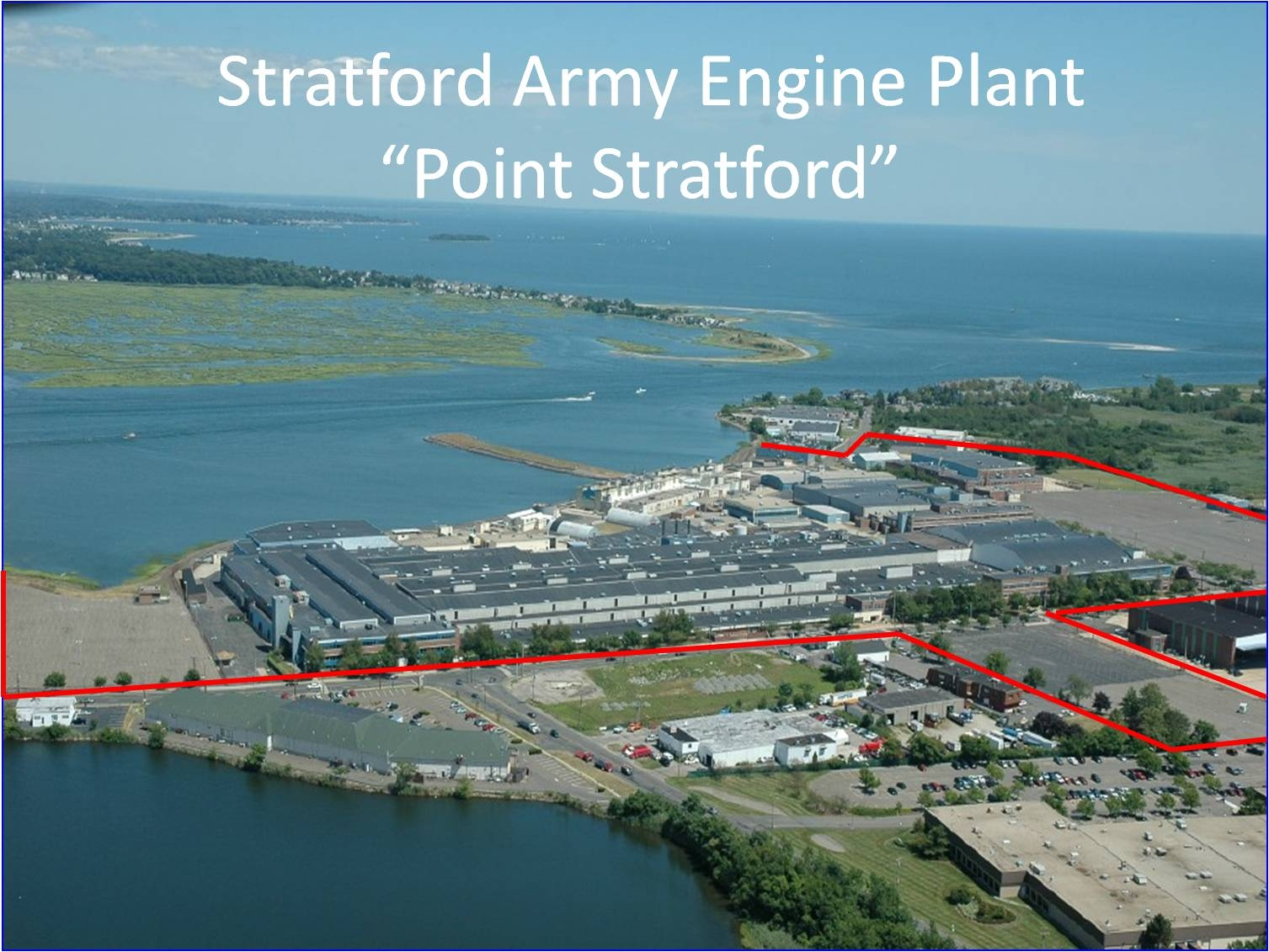
The Stratford Army Engine Plant

The Stratford Army Engine Plant (SAEP) was a U.S. Army Tank-Automotive and Armaments Command installation and manufacturing facility located in Stratford, Connecticut, where it was sited along the Housatonic River and Main Street, opposite Sikorsky Memorial Airport.

== History ==
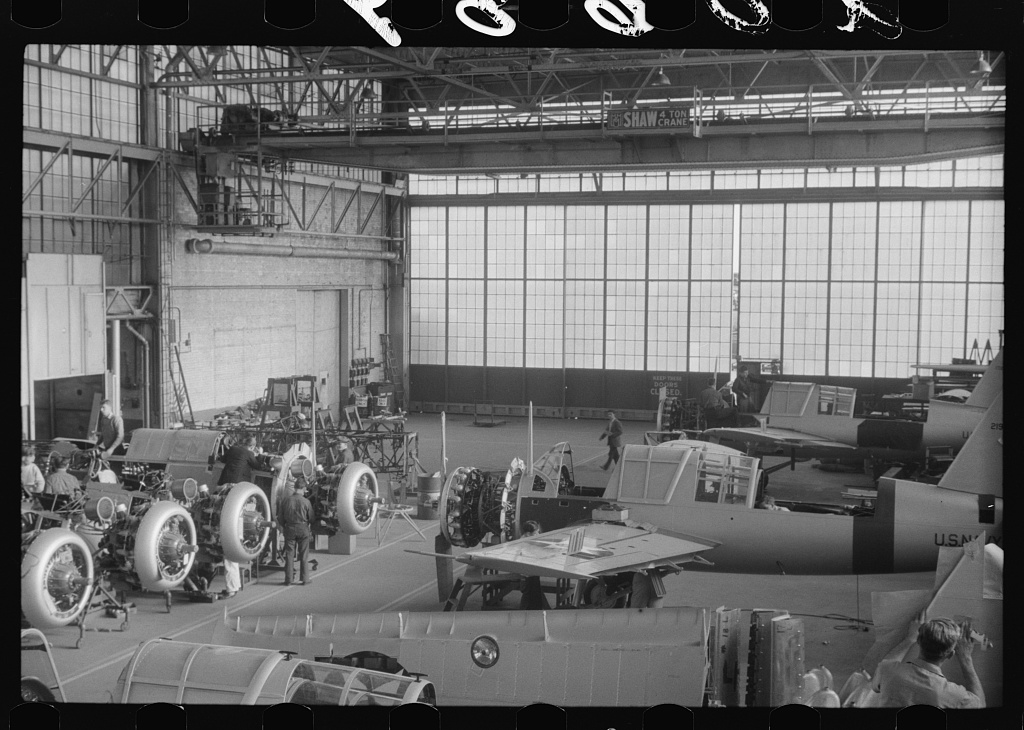
Vought OS2U production in 1940.

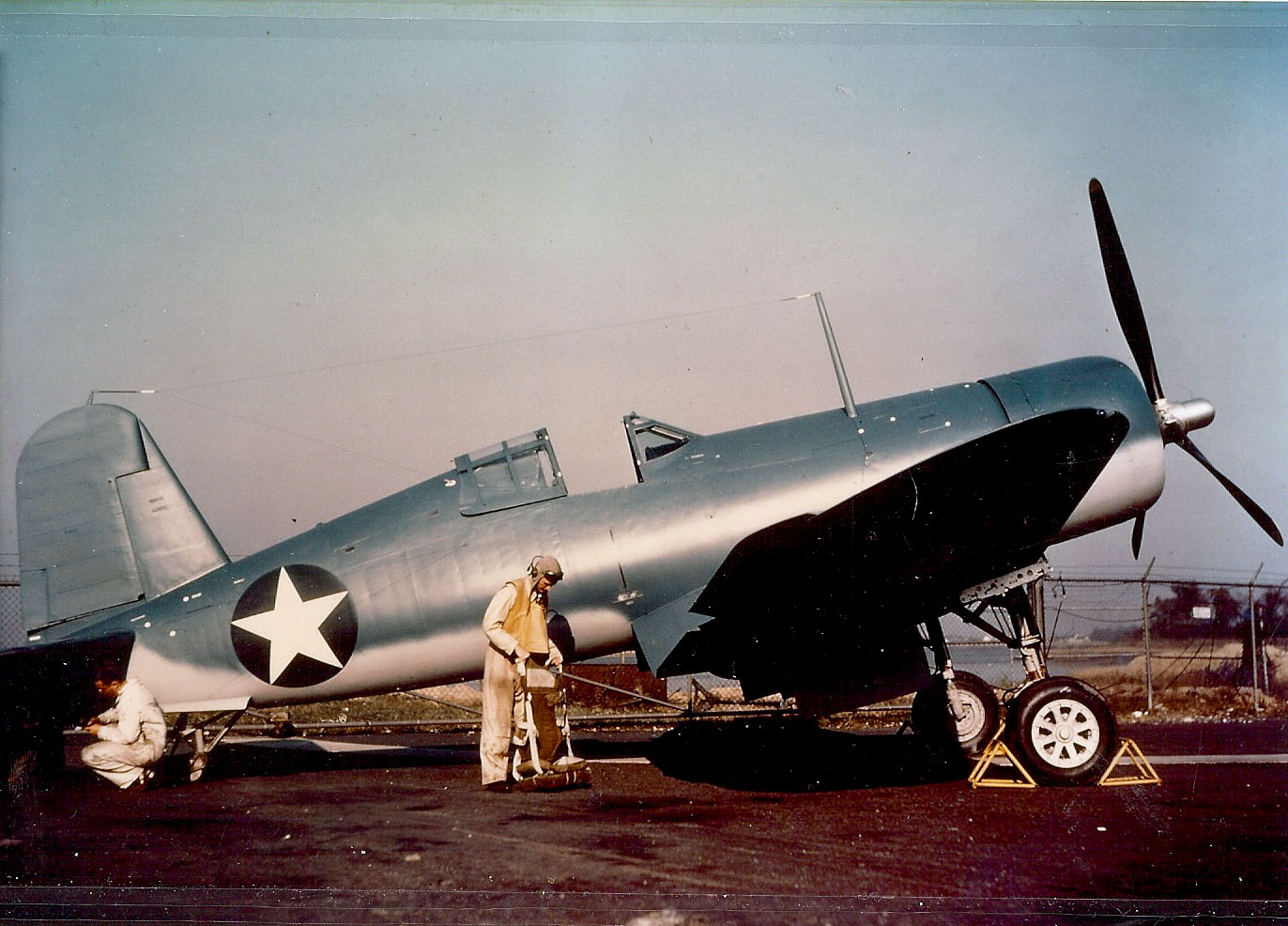
A Vought F4U-1 Corsair at Stratford in 1942.

External image
- Map of plant buildings by number from the Town of Stratford

Prior to 1927, the SAEP property was farmland. The plant was originally built in 1929 as Sikorsky Aero Engineering Corporations's manufacturing facility. It occupied a 124-acre (50 ha) tract and included 49 industrial buildings and an earthen causeway that was built 800 feet (240 m) into the Housatonic River mudflats to provide for access by seaplanes. The Sikorsky S-39, Sikorsky S-40 "Flying Forest", Sikorsky S-41, Sikorsky S-42 "Clipper" and Sikorsky S-43 "Baby Clipper" were built in this plant, which had a seaplane ramp for launching the aircraft into the Housatonic River.

When sales of amphibians fell in the late 1930s, due to the growing popularity of land-based aircraft, Sikorsky was merged with the Chance Vought Company by their parent United Aircraft in 1938. The Vought-Sikorsky company then built the Vought-Sikorsky VS-44, Vought-Sikorsky OS2U Kingfisher, Vought-Sikorsky F4U Corsair and Vought-Sikorsky V-173 in the facility.

After the combined company was broken into Vought Aircraft and Sikorsky Aircraft in January 1943, Vought built the Vought TBY Sea Wolf, Vought XF5U, Vought F6U Pirate and prototype Vought F7U Cutlass in the facility. Igor Sikorsky, given $250,000 for helicopter development by United Aircraft, also developed the Vought-Sikorsky VS-300, Vought-Sikorsky VS-316 R-4, Vought-Sikorsky VS-327 R-5 and Vought-Sikorsky VS-316B R-6 in the plant. Sikorsky's production was moved to a plant in Bridgeport Connecticut in 1943 and Vought production was moved to an empty US government facility in Dallas Texas in 1949. In 1954 Sikorsky moved the majority of their manufacturing to a new plant on the north side of Stratford, further up the Housatonic River. This move left the Stratford plant vacant, and soon afterward, flooding from the Housatonic River damaged much of the facility.

In 1951 the US Air Force had purchased the facility and renamed it Air Force Plant No. 43. Avco Corporation became the contractor operating the plant, repaired the damaged buildings, and built dikes. the same year Avco moved its division Lycoming into the plant, which was a contractor to the U.S. Army Aviation Systems Command and began manufacturing Wright R-1820 piston engines and General Electric J47 components there. In 1952 Lycoming had Anselm Franz set up a turbine engine development effort in the plant and the Lycoming T53, Lycoming T55, Lycoming PLF1, Lycoming LTS101/LPT101, Lycoming ALF 502, Lycoming AGT1500 and Lycoming TF-40 turbine engines were all designed, developed and manufactured in this facility. By 1968, 10,000 people were employed in the plant. In 1976, the plant was transferred from the Air Force to the Army and renamed the 'Stratford Army Engine Plant'. Production of the LTS-101 and LPT-101 turbine engines was moved to Williamsport, Pennsylvania beginning in 1980. In 1987 Avco was purchased by Textron to become Textron Lycoming and in 1995, Allied Signal acquired the Lycoming Turbine Engine Division in Stratford. By this time, employment in the plant had fallen to 2,900 people.

== Plant Closure ==
In July 1995 the Base Realignment and Closure of the United States Department of Defense, recommended closure of the plant. In late 1995, Allied Signal announced that production would be shifted to its facility in Phoenix Arizona. On 30 September 1998, Allied Signal concluded operations in the plant and returned it to the US Army and a complete closure of the Stratford plant was agreed shortly thereafter. AGT1500 production was shifted by the Army to the Anniston Army Depot (ANAD) in Anniston, Alabama.

For the next 11 years the Army was involved with "Team Stratford" to develop the property. On 19 March 2008 the United States Army auctioned the 78-acre (320,000 m^{2}) site off with a winning bid of $9,612,000 which also included the 1,720,000-square-foot (160,000 m^{2}) facility of over 50 buildings. This bid failed to be paid off and was placed for rebid. Robert Hartmann of Hartmann Development has a $1 billion plan to develop the former plant into a destination resort, dependent on the US government selling him the entire property for one dollar.

The facility remained inactive and abandoned since its closure in 1998, though the Connecticut Air and Space Center occupied part of the site, consisting of 6 buildings, until 2022.

== Environmental contamination ==
Investigation of the brownfield to understand the extent of releases and to determine cleanup were ongoing as of 2014. The wastes of nearly 70 years of aircraft construction included waste oil, fuels, solvents, and paints. An on-site chemical waste treatment plant released effluent to the Housatonic River under a National Pollutant Discharge Elimination System permit. Beginning in 1980, waste lagoons were regulated under the Resource Conservation and Recovery Act (RCRA) and part of a 'treatment, storage, or disposal facility'. The lagoons were closed under RCRA during the 1980s. In 1983 the plant was cited for violations of the Toxic Substances Control Act regarding reporting of polychlorinated biphenyl (PCB)-containing transformers.

Subsurface investigations in 1981, 1983, 1985, and 1986, a 1991 Environmental Baseline Survey/Preliminary Assessment Screening by the Corps of Engineers, a 1993 Remedial Investigation Report and a 1996 Environmental Baseline Survey Report have been done.

Areas of environmental concern include: "Intertidal Flats where runoff and effluent have contaminated sediments with PCBs and metals; a Shoreline Fill Area where subsurface soil and groundwater are contaminated with fuel-related and halogenated volatile organic compounds (VOCs), polynuclear aromatic hydrocarbons (PAHs), and metals; the Plating and Manufacturing Area, where "greenish-blue" groundwater pumped from the area has been documented to contain metals including chromium and lead, halogenated VOCs, PAHs, and cyanide; the Building B-2/North Parking Lot/West Parking Lot area, where subsurface soils comprise ash and cinder fill and contain PAHs and groundwater is contaminated with halogenated VOCs; Building B-65, where chromium- and petroleum-contaminated soils were discovered; the Research and Development Area, where subsurface soil and groundwater contamination is suspected; the South Parking Lot/Chemical Waste Treatment Plant/Closed Lagoons area, where halogenated VOCs and metals have been detected in groundwater; and the Testing Area, where subsurface soils are contaminated with fuel-related and halogenated VOCs and PAHs, and groundwater is contaminated with halogenated VOCs."

Furthermore, surface water and sediment samples downstream of the plant show contamination with halogenated VOCs, PCBs, and metals. Numerous monitoring wells downgradient of the sources on the plant have been dug, and groundwater samples also contain fuel-related and halogenated VOCs and metals.

== Remediation ==
The Connecticut Department of Energy and Environmental Protection (DEEP) leads oversight of the site's environmental remediation. Before selling the property to the developer 'Point Stratford Renewal' DEEP and the U.S. Army as of June 2014 still need to agree on the degree of clean up the Housatonic riverbed. Residential developers have shown the most interest as of 2014, planning up to 1,500 residential units. Point Stratford Renewal is a collaboration of the three Connecticut companies Loureiro Properties LLC, Development Resources LLC and Sedgwick Partners LLC. In May 2014, the State House of Representatives and the State Senate had passed a bill to create a special tax district at the plant to levy taxes and issue bonds. This will help finance the redevelopment project, particularly road construction, sewage systems, and environmental remediation.

== Demolition and Re-development of site ==
Plans to demolish the plant and clear the site including remediation were announced in July 2024. The removal process includes demolishing the many buildings, dredging large parts of the Housatonic River and clearing hazardous materials found on the site. Demolition and clean-up efforts of the entire site are expected to begin in 2025 and wrap up by mid 2026, though the exact future development plans for the site have yet to be determined.
