= Connecticut Air & Space Center =

Connecticut Air and Space Center

- Stratford, Connecticut, USA
- Established: 1998
- Location: 225 B Main Street, Stratford, Connecticut, United States
- Coordinates: 41.170119°N 73.120509°W
- Type: Aviation museum
- Founder: George Gunther
- President: Mark Corvino
- Curator: Christopher Soltis
- Website: ctairandspace.org

The Connecticut Air & Space Center is an aviation museum located near Igor I. Sikorsky Memorial Airport in Stratford, Connecticut, that is focused on the history of aviation in Connecticut. Founded by George Gunther in 1998 after the closing of the Stratford Army Engine Plant, it occupied buildings 6 and 53 of the complex from 2001 until 2022. It now currently occupies a portion of the Curtiss Hangar and is open to the public.

== History ==
=== Establishment in Stratford Army Engine Plant ===
The Connecticut Air & Space Center was founded in 1998 by state senator George Gunther. A year later, planning was underway to build the museum as part of a redevelopment of the airport. By April 2000, the museum had plans to open in the former Stratford Army Engine Plant. However, by January 2007, momentum seemed to be moving away from this possibility. Despite the state Historical Preservation Commission nominating the plant for inclusion on the National Register of Historic Places in October, it was put up for auction in February 2008. In the meantime, the museum had grown in size, with multiple aircraft projects being acquired, and Gunther had undergone intensive surgery. The property was still owned by the US Army at the time, and therefore only allowed visitors that were 18 or older to be able to visit.

In 2012, the museum was damaged by Hurricane Sandy.

=== Move to Curtiss Hangar ===
Anticipating eviction from the plant, in 2015 the museum began working with the Town of Stratford and City of Bridgeport to secure a 98-year lease for the dilapidated 1929 Curtiss Aircraft Hangar. Groundbreaking for the restoration occurred in May 2016. That same year, a Sikorsky S-76 was donated to the museum for use as a parts source. In 2018, the museum received a $1 million grant from the state of Connecticut to restore the hangar. To be able to display a small portion of their collection while advancing plans for the restoration of the main hangar, it then began renovating a 3,600 sq ft (330 m^{2}) 1960's era addition. The addition, referred to as the "Blue Building", opened in May 2021. A plan to sell the airport in 2022 put plans for renovation and use of the Curtiss Hangar in jeopardy. The museum was informed that it would be forced to remove artifacts from storage in Building 6 of the Stratford Army Engine Plant in 2025.

The museum is currently renting out an external collections storage facility as well as a separate small workshop to continue to restore vintage aircraft.

== Collection ==
The museum currently has 18 aircraft in its collection:

- Bede BD-5
- Beechcraft A23 Musketeer
- Bell 47
- Cessna T-37B Tweet 57-2346
- Cessna O-2A Skymaster 67-21318
- Cessna 150L 15074606
- Christen Eagle II Serial #1
- Goodyear FG-1D Corsair 92460
- Hughes OH-6A Cayuse 67-16477
- Lockheed T-33B 57-6558
- Northrop T-38A Talon 60-0900
- Sikorsky S-52
- Sikorsky S-52
- Sikorsky S-55 52-7573
- Sikorsky S-58
- Sikorsky S-60
- Sikorsky S-76A
- Whitehead No. 21 Replica

== See also ==
- List of aerospace museums
