= Tailwind Air =

Scheduled air carrier and charter airline based in New York City Seaplane Base

Tailwind Air LLC
IATA	ICAO	Call sign
TQ	PGN	PEREGRINE
- Founded: 2014
- Ceased operations: January 15, 2026
- Hubs: New York–Skyport; Sikorsky Memorial Airport (Connecticut); Boston Harbor Seaplane Base
- Focus cities: New York Skyports Inc. Seaplane Base; New York City; Boston Harbor Seaplane Base; Westchester County Airport
- Fleet size: 16
- Destinations: 9
- Headquarters: Rye Brook, NY
- Key people: Shane Reynolds; Michael Siegel; Alan Ram; Peter Manice; Wensley Barker
- Website: http://flytailwind.com/

Tailwind Air LLC was an American commuter scheduled air carrier and charter airline based in Westchester Airport and Sikorsky Memorial Airport. Its main seaplane base was New York Skyports Seaplane Base (NYS) and it also owned its own Boston Harbor seaplane base (MA17), near Logan International Airport in Boston. The airline had a sister company named Tailwind Air, LLC, which charters and manages a fleet of land planes.

== History ==
Tailwind operated scheduled and charter seaplane services out of the 23rd Street Seaplane base in Manhattan (NYS). Tailwind serviced Boston Logan Airport, Boston Harbor Seaplane Base, Shelter Island, Bridgeport, and the East Hampton Airport and Nantucket Airport with multiple shuttle flights. Initial competitors on these routes included Amtrak, American Airlines, and Delta's hourly shuttle services. Tailwind intended to move its routes to all water airports after regulatory approval. The routes were not serviced by any existing seaplane operator. In-flight service included complimentary snacks and beverages.

Tailwind Air ceased scheduled services in early 2024 and was currently charter-only. The airline had reported that scheduled operations had not reached profitability, and they failed to get a large enough investment to continue slow growth in ticketing.

On January 15, 2026, Tailwind Air filed for Chapter 11 bankruptcy protection, marking the end of Tailwind's 4 year service.

== Destinations ==
Tailwind operated flights to the following destinations:

List of destinations
City	Country (subdivision)	Code	Airport	Notes
New York City	United States (New York)	NYS	New York Skyports Seaplane Base	
Shelter Island	United States (New York)	SH1	Sunset Beach	
Bridgeport	United States (Connecticut)	BDR	Sikorsky Memorial Airport	
Boston	United States (Massachusetts)	BNH	Boston Harbor Seaplane Base	Service began on August 3, 2021
Nantucket	United States (Massachusetts)	ACK	Nantucket Memorial Airport	Service began on May 17, 2023
Plymouth	United States (Massachusetts)	PYM	Plymouth Municipal Airport	
Provincetown	United States (Massachusetts)	PVC	Provincetown Municipal Airport	Service began on May 25, 2022
Newport	United States (Rhode Island)	NPT	Newport State Airport	
Dulles	United States (Virginia)	IAD	Dulles International Airport	Service began on October 14, 2022.

== Fleet ==
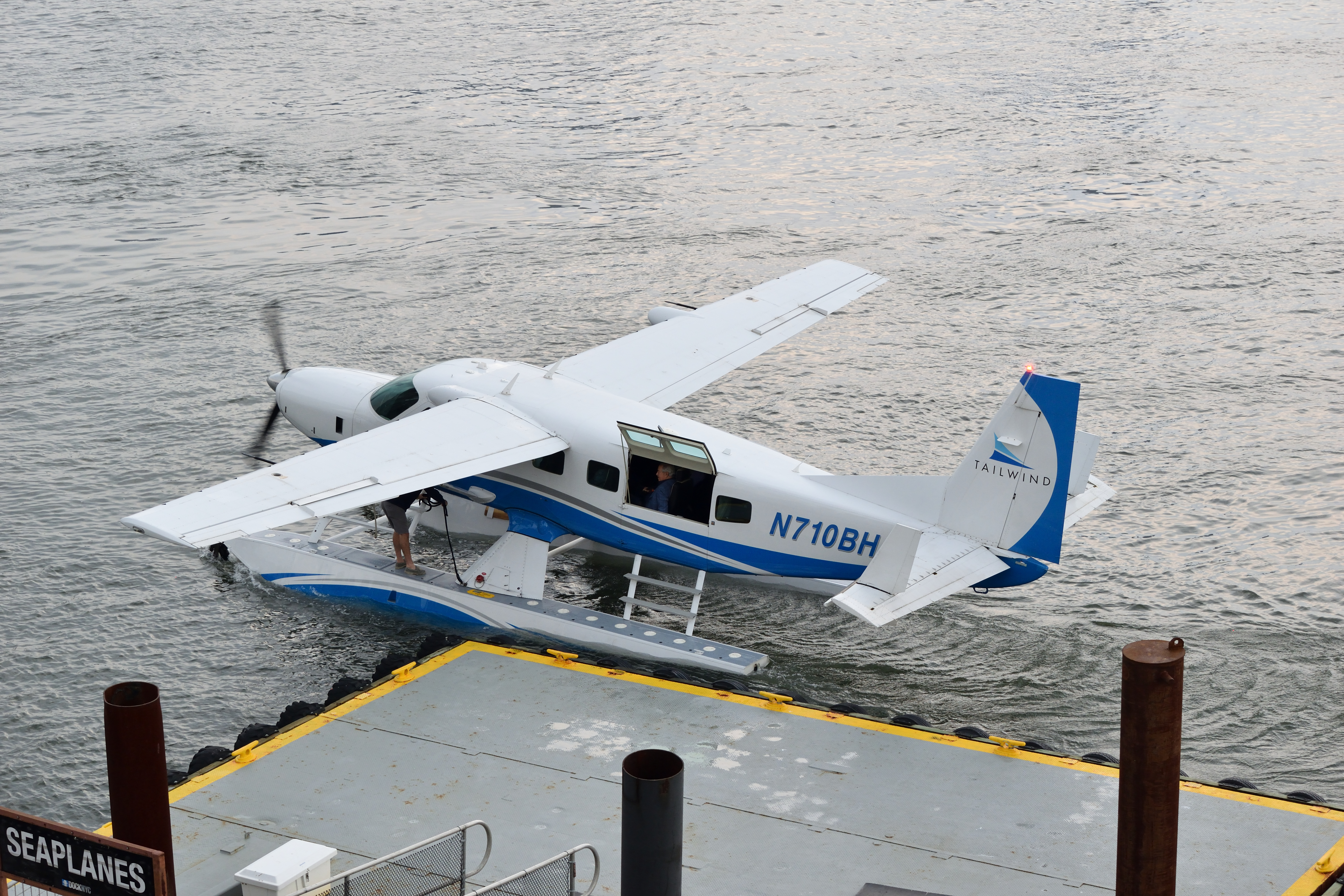
Tailwind Air seaplane leaving the dock at the New York Skyport

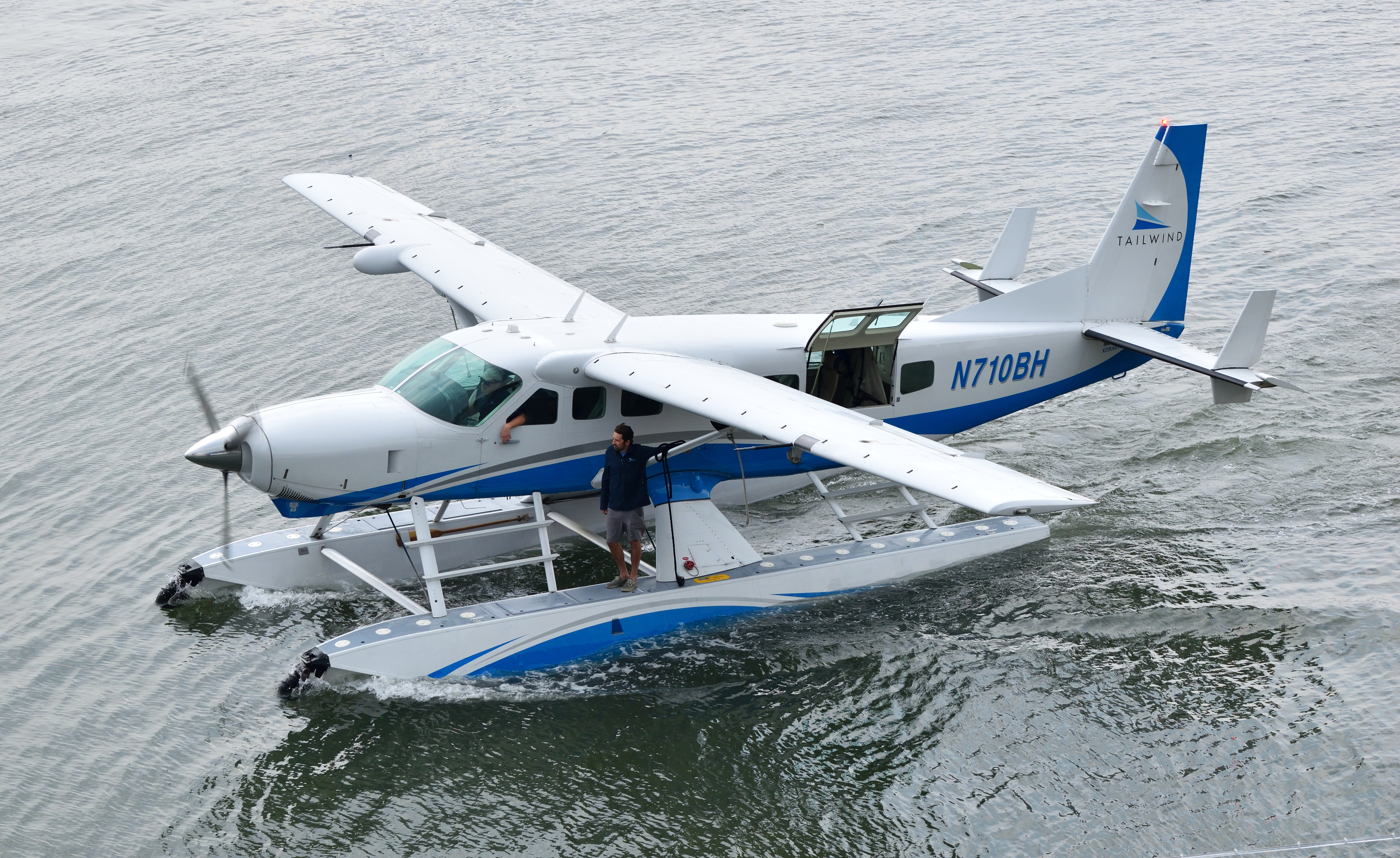
A Tailwind Air Cessna 208 Caravan

The Tailwind Air fleet consisted of the following aircraft:

- 3 Cessna 208EX Caravan
- 1 Dassault Falcon 50
- 2 Dassault Falcon 900EX
- 3 SOCATA TBM-700
- 3 SOCATA TBM-900
- 1 Beechcraft King Air 250
- 1 Cessna Citation CJ3
- 1 Dassault Falcon 100
- 1 Pilatus PC-12

=== Former fleet ===
- 1 × Embraer Phenom 300
