= Sikorsky Memorial Airport =

Igor I. Sikorsky Memorial Airport

- USGS 2006 orthophoto
- IATA: BDR; ICAO: KBDR; FAA LID: BDR; WMO: 72504

Summary
- Airport type: Public
- Owner: City of Bridgeport
- Operator: Sikorsky Memorial Airport Operations and Safety Department
- Serves: Bridgeport, Connecticut
- Location: Stratford, Connecticut
- Elevation AMSL: 9 ft (2.7 m)
- Coordinates: 41°09′48″N 073°07′34″W
- Website: bridgeportct.gov/airport

Maps
- FAA diagram
- Interactive map of Igor I. Sikorsky Memorial Airport

Runways
Direction	Length		Surface
Direction	ft	m	Surface
11/29	4,761	1,451	Asphalt
06/24	4,677	1,426	Asphalt

Helipads
Number	Length		Surface
Number	ft	m	Surface
H1	40	12	Asphalt

Statistics (2015)
- Aircraft operations: 47,380
- Based aircraft: 190
- Source: Federal Aviation Administration

Igor I. Sikorsky Memorial Airport (IATA: BDR, ICAO: KBDR, FAA LID: BDR) is a public airport in Fairfield County, Connecticut, United States, owned by the city of Bridgeport. It is three miles (6 km) southeast of downtown, in the town of Stratford. It was formerly Bridgeport Municipal Airport.

The Federal Aviation Administration (FAA) National Plan of Integrated Airport Systems for 2017–2021 categorized it as a general aviation facility. It has three fixed-base operators (FBOs) and several private hangars.

In 2016, Tailwind Air Service started seaplane flights between Sikorsky and the New York Skyports Seaplane Base in central Manhattan.

== History ==
The airport was originally Avon Field, a racetrack where aircraft landed on the grass infield. It was the site of the country's first air show held in 1911, on the grounds of what is now St. Michaels Cemetery. It became known as Mollison Field after Captain Jim Mollison's crash landing there in 1933 during an attempt to fly across the Atlantic. The City of Bridgeport purchased the airport in 1937, after which it became Bridgeport Municipal Airport.

Adjacent to the airport was an industrial facility known in 1929 as Sikorsky Aircraft, in 1943 as Vought Aircraft, in 1951 as Air Force Plant 43, and in 1976 as the Stratford Army Engine Plant. Throughout that time the facility produced flying boats, early helicopters, WW2 aircraft, early jet fighters, and aircraft engines. It closed in 1998.

In the 1950s, American Airlines stopped at Bridgeport, one Convair a day; American left in 1960. Allegheny Airlines then provided service until 1976.

In 1972, the facility was rededicated as the Igor I. Sikorsky Memorial Airport, honoring its most famous tenant, Igor Sikorsky, who selected Stratford as the site for his Sikorsky Aviation Corporation in 1929.

In the 1980s, the airport was served by five carriers or their regional affiliates: Business Express Airlines, Continental Airlines, Piedmont Airlines, US Air and United Express. In 1992 airlines flew from Bridgeport to several cities in the northeast, including Washington, DC, Philadelphia, Boston and Newark. After US Airways left the airport in 1999, Sikorsky was left without any commercial flights.

The airport has been the subject of heated debate in Stratford and Bridgeport, as while the City of Bridgeport owns the airport, the whole property is in the Town of Stratford. Before the end of World War II little more than salt marshes surrounded the airport, but in the 1950s and 1960s Stratford permitted extensive residential development in the Lordship area near the airfield. Bridgeport has pushed for runway and terminal expansion, hoping to attract new service to the airport, arguing that service to the airport is necessary for the growth of Bridgeport's economy. Stratford has opposed terminal expansion and runway lengthening that would interfere with existing roads. Even when the airport was served by major carriers, Stratford advocated for limits on flights because of noise in the Lordship and South End neighborhoods. In 2003, the Federal Aviation Administration mandated the lengthening of the two runways with unpaved safety overruns at each end. Stratford and Connecticut officials have resisted the FAA effort to install the overruns, but the FAA has notified Stratford, Bridgeport and state officials that it may obtain a federal court order to use eminent domain to complete the overruns.

In June 2006, US Helicopter began scheduled flights to New York's Downtown Manhattan Heliport, continuing to John F. Kennedy International Airport. This was the first airline service since 1999. The service was eliminated in the Spring of 2009, having failed to turn a profit.

In February 2007, state legislators from Bridgeport, in an effort to force expansion, introduced legislation allowing the State of Connecticut to take over the airport. Officials from Stratford would prefer the town take ownership of the airport and opposed the proposed state takeover.

In October 2016, runway 6-24 re-opened after closing in late 2014 so a 300-foot length of engineered materials arrestor system (EMAS) could be installed at its east end.

== Facilities ==
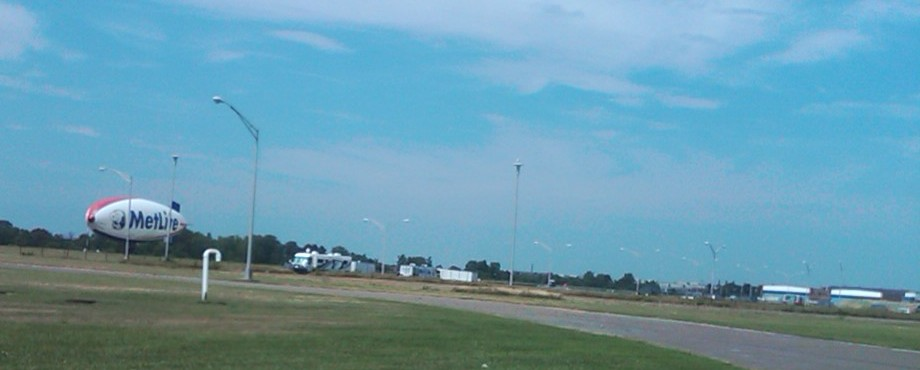
The Metlife blimp on the southern field in July 2011

The airport covers 800 acres (324 ha) at an elevation of 9 feet (3 m). It has two asphalt runways: 11/29 is 4,761 by 150 feet (1,451 x 46 m) and 06/24 is 4,677 by 100 feet (1,426 x 30 m).

Each runway has a runway safety area that does not meet FAA requirements. Both are wide enough, but 06/24 is 10% and 11/29 is 25% of the required length.

In the year ending February 28, 2019, the airport averaged 136 aircraft operations per day: 94% general aviation, 6% air taxi, and <1% military. 155 aircraft were based at the airport: 107 single-engine, 32 jet, 10 multi-engine, 5 helicopter, and one glider.

=== Airships ===
At over 800 acres, the airport has room for a number of airships, usually moored south of the 11/29 runway. Often blimps use Sikorsky as a base for flyovers of regional sporting events because of lack of space at other airports, security concerns, and avoiding controlled airspace around cities and larger airports. Approximately 20 dockings are made per year. Visitors have included the Ameriquest, Fuji, Hood, Metlife, and Monster.Com airships.

=== Helicopters ===
Connecticut Airpad 37 (CT 37) is a private-use heliport active since November 1960, featuring two asphalt helipad landing facilities called H1 and H2.

=== Stratford Eagles Composite Squadron ===
The Stratford Eagles Composite Squadron is a member group of the non-profit and all-volunteer Connecticut Wing Civil Air Patrol, which is an official auxiliary of the United States Air Force, carrying the designation NER-CT-022. It performs various duties such as pilot training, search and rescue, disaster relief, and fire watch.

Formed in 1963, the group moved to its present World War II era barracks on west side of the airport at 1100 Stratford Road in 1972. A predecessor group of the same name had been active in spotting German U-boats and air-sea rescue operations during the war from the airfield.

In September 2016 Major Kenneth Fortes was named squadron commander, and was the first African-American to lead a Connecticut Wing squadron. As of May 2018, the current squadron commander is Captain Robert Talley.

=== Curtiss and Sikorsky hangars ===
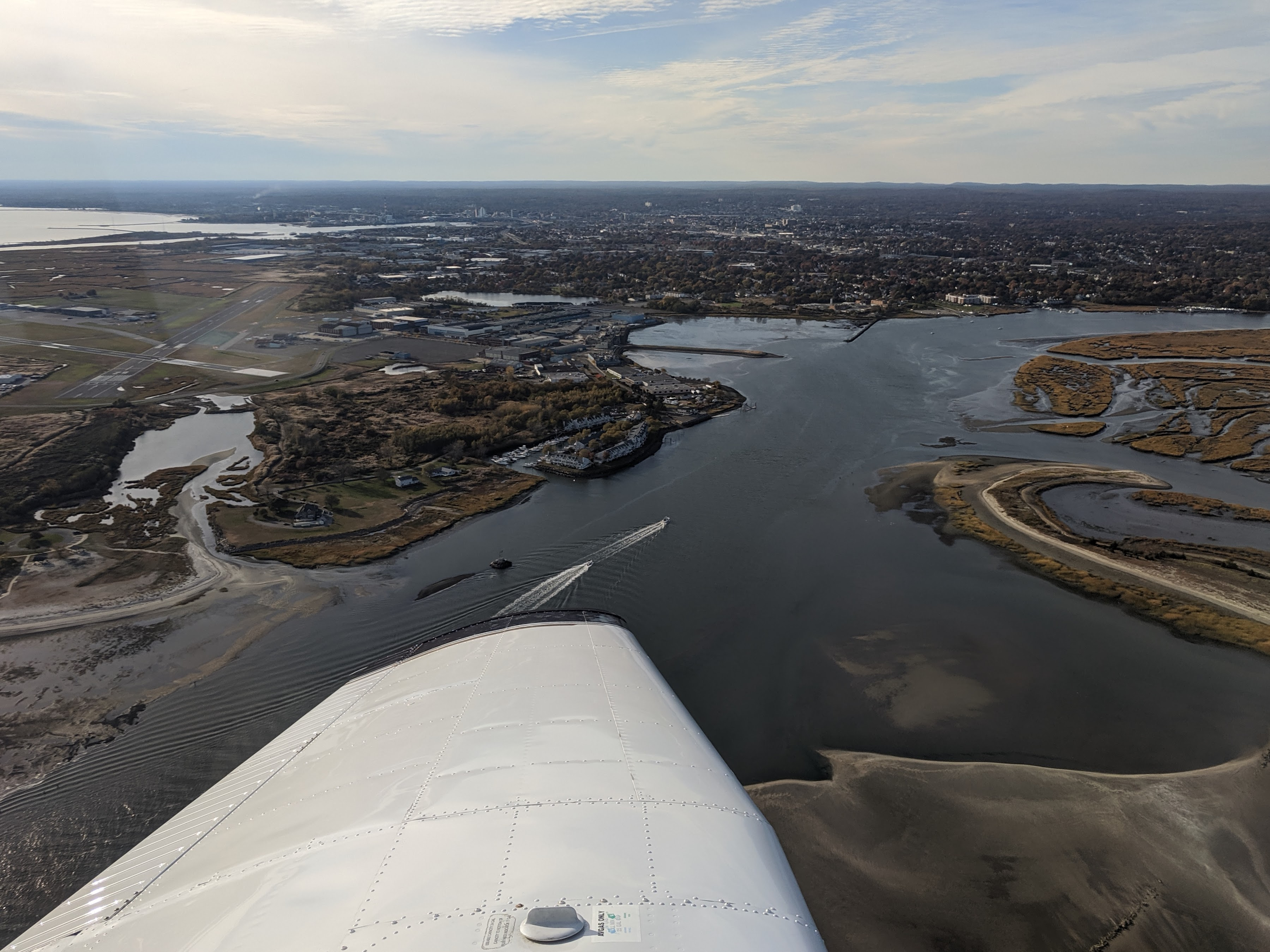
View of BDR (left), the Housatonic River, and Stratford, CT

A historically important structure on the airport's grounds is the Curtiss Hangar, built in 1928 by Glenn Curtiss. The hangar served as the home of a branch of the Curtiss Flying School for several years. In 1930, Sikorsky began flying boat production next to the hangar including the Pan AM Clipper. Early Sikorsky helicopter development, including the first practical helicopter, the Vought-Sikorsky VS-300 occurred on the grounds.

The Curtiss hangar was referred to as "Hangar 1", while the Sikorsky hangar was referred to as "Hangar 2".

Howard Hughes kept aircraft in the hangar, Amelia Earhart visited, and Charles Lindbergh test piloted the Vought V-173 "Flying Pancake" in the 1940s. During World War II 8000 Chance-Vought F4U Corsair fighter-bombers were produced across the street and flown from the hangar for the war in the Pacific. The XF4U prototype was stored in the hangar.

In 2018 the Connecticut Air and Space Center announced that the hangar is being restored into a museum of flight focusing on locally manufactured aircraft including a Chance-Vought F4U Corsair, a replica of the Gustave Whitehead 1901 flyer and a Sikorsky S-60 helicopter.

== Airlines and destinations ==
There are no scheduled operations at this time. Tailwind Air previously provided scheduled and charter service, but lost its Air Operator's Certificate in January 2025, and filed for Chapter 11 bankruptcy in January 2026.

=== Cargo ===
There are no cargo operators at BDR at this time.

== Accidents and incidents ==
- On April 27, 1994, a Piper PA-31-350 Navajo Chieftain, registration N990RA, operated by Action Air Charters, overshot the 6-24 runway and struck a fence, killing eight of the nine aboard.
- In June 1933 a de Havilland Dragon named "Seafarer" flown by Jim Mollison and Amy Johnson crashed-landed. The aviators survived but the plane was a complete loss.

== See also ==
- Connecticut World War II Army Airfields
- List of airports in Connecticut
- Igor I. Sikorsky Memorial Bridge
- Sikorsky Aircraft
