= Plainville High School =

Public high school in Connecticut, USA

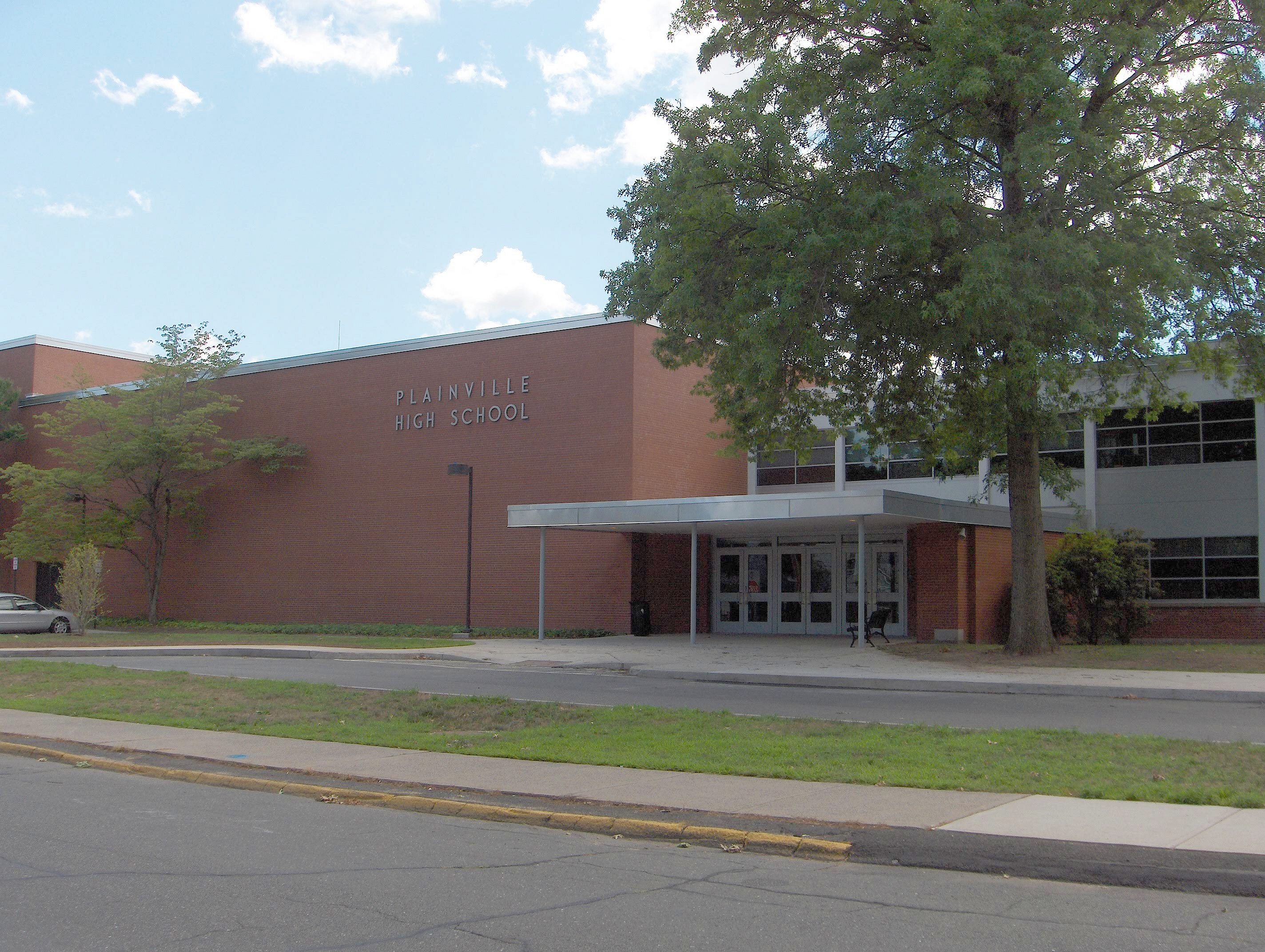
- Plainville High School, 2010

Location
- 47 Robert Holcomb Way; Plainville, Connecticut 06062; United States; 41°39′58″N 72°51′31″W

Information
- Type: Public
- Motto: Taking Education To New Heights
- School district: Plainville School District
- Superintendent: Brian Reas
- CEEB code: 070610
- Principal: Jennifer DeLorenzo
- Teaching staff: 57.87 (FTE)
- Grades: 9 - 12
- Enrollment: 688 (2023–2024)
- Student to teacher ratio: 11.89
- Colors: Blue and white
- Team name: Blue Devils
- Website: phs.plainvilleschools.org

Plainville High School is a public high school in Plainville, Connecticut. It is the only high school in the town of Plainville, Connecticut.

== History ==
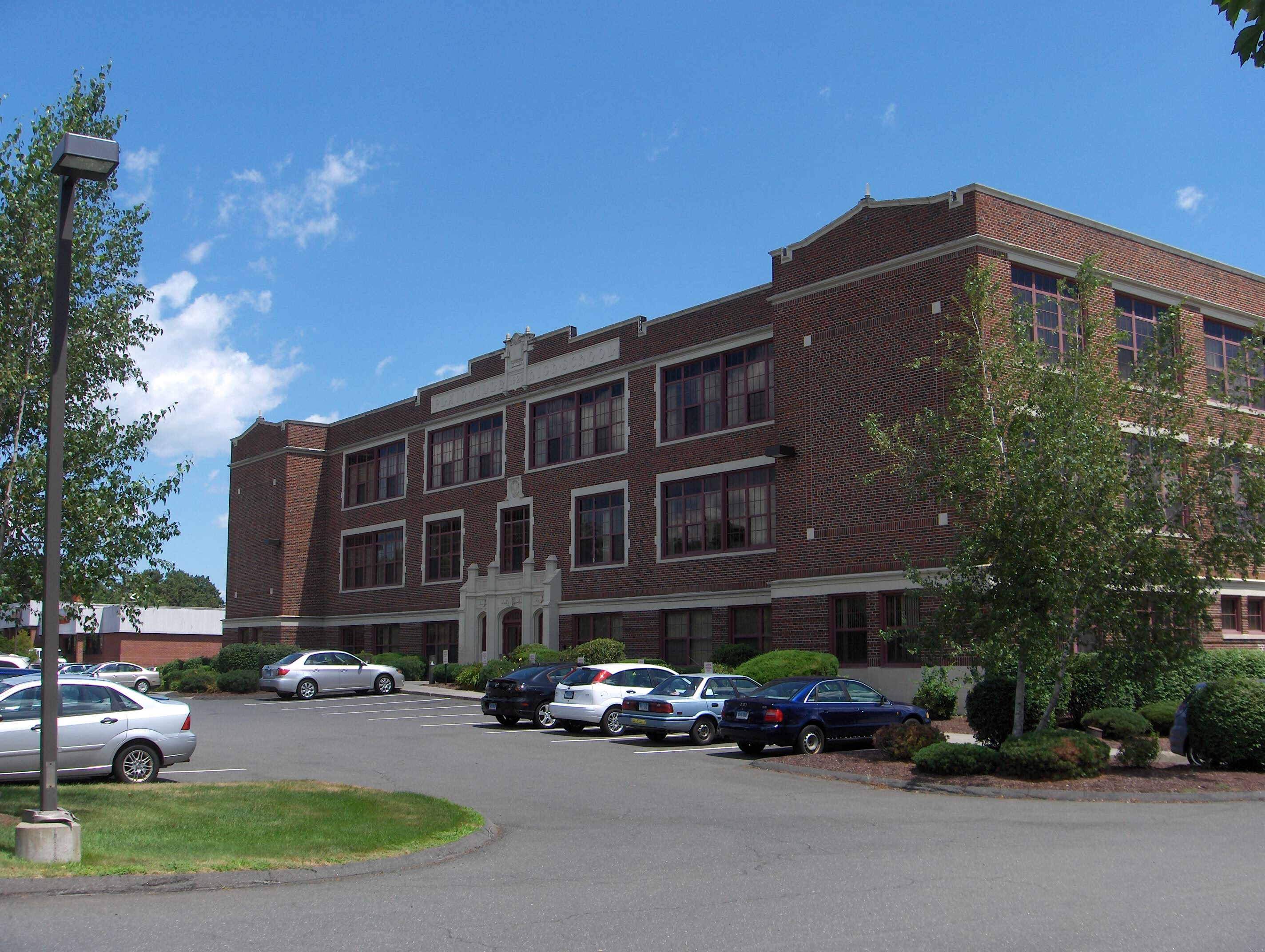
East Street school

Plainville High School was previously located on East Street from the 1920s through the 1950s. It later became Plainville Junior High School up until the mid-1990s when they built the Middle School of Plainville on Northwest Drive. In the 1950s they built a new high school around the corner on Walnut Street. In the 1977 the town renamed the street Robert Holcomb Way, in honor of a former town police officer who was killed while on duty.

=== Renovations ===
The high school, originally built in the mid-1950s, was once considered old and outdated but has since been fully renovated. It was expanded in the early 1970s and is now some 30 to 50 years old. Nothing else was done to the school until 2006 when the school began a full-scale renovation that was finished for the 2008-2009 school year. The school now is up-to-date in both appearance and technology. Other upgrades since the school was constructed include a new elevator that was installed in 2002 at the east end of the school to provide accessibility to the second floor, but given the length of the building a second accessible means of access to the second floor is recommended. In the mid-2000s the school discovered that it had asbestos.

== Athletics ==
The school’s athletic teams are known as the Blue Devils, the same as nearby Central Connecticut State University. For all sports except football they compete in the Northwest Conference (NWC). In football they compete in the Nutmeg League. However, in the 2009-2010 school year the sports teams will compete in the Central Connecticut Conference in the South Division. In baseball, the main rivalry is with Berlin High School (Connecticut). The Plainville Sports Hall of Fame was created in 1998.

The Blue Devils have won 8 CIAC state championships in baseball; the second most out of all schools in the state, just behind Waterford which has won 11.

Wins in CIAC State Championships
Sport	Class	Year(s)
Baseball	M	1983, 1984, 1999, 2008, 2012
Baseball	L	1992, 1994, 1995
Basketball (boys)	M	1943, 1959, 1961
Basketball (boys)	IV	2006
Basketball (girls)	M	2001
Cheer	M	2024
Cheer	Coed	2019, 2023
Cross country (boys)	M	1962
Golf (boys)	II	1983
Soccer (boys)	M	2018
Track and field (indoor, boys)	M	1961, 1962, 1963, 1964
Track and field (outdoor, boys)	M	1948, 1958, 1959, 1961, 1962
Track and field (outdoor, girls)	M	1996

== Notable alumni ==
- John Bello, creator of SoBe and former President of National Football League Properties (NFLP), marketing arm of the NFL.
- Ted Christopher, NASCAR driver.
- Niko Koutouvides, NFL player for the New England Patriots.
- Don Maitz, science fiction, fantasy, and commercial artist.
- Earl Snyder, MLB player for the Cleveland Indians and 2004 World Champion Boston Red Sox.
- Sheri Moon Zombie, wife of Rob Zombie and actress in many of his films and music videos.
