= Reed's =

American soft drinks and candies company

Reed's, Inc.
- Company type: Public
- Traded as: OTCQX: REED
- Industry: Beverages, Soft Drinks
- Founded: 1989; 37 years ago
- Founder: Christopher J. Reed
- Headquarters: Norwalk, Connecticut
- Area served: North America
- Key people: Norman E. Snyder (CEO, Director); Christopher J. Reed (CIO, Founder); John Bello (Chairman)
- Revenue: ▼US$33.820 Million (FY 2019)
- Number of employees: 28 (Dec 2019)
- Website: drinkreeds.com

Reed's Inc. is a US-based company that manufactures soft drinks and candies. The company was founded by Christopher J. Reed in 1989. It was originally based in Los Angeles, California, but moved its headquarters to Norwalk, Connecticut, in September 2018.

== History ==
Reed began developing his first ginger beverage in 1987 while researching the health benefits of ginger. In 1989, after two years of research and development, he began marketing the beverage in Southern California. In 1991, Reed incorporated his company under the name of Original Beverage Corporation.

Original Beverage Corporation purchased the Virgil's Root Beer brand from the Crowley Beverage Company in 1999. Original Beverage Corporation reincorporated as Reed's Inc on September 7, 2001, with Reed as the initial director.

On October 11, 2006, Reed's Inc. became a public company. As of 2018, Reed's Inc. products are sold in over 30,000 retail stores in the United States. The company reported $37.7 million in net sales in 2017. The company's stock moved from Nasdaq to the OTC Market in 2023.

== Organization ==
In 2016, John Bello joined the board of directors as chairman. Bello is the founder and former CEO of South Beach Beverage Company, which makes teas and juices marketed under the SoBe brand name.

In April 2017, Reed became the Chief Innovation Officer, a newly created position, leaving the CEO position vacant. On June 28, 2017, Valentin Stalowir, a former executive at The Coca-Cola Company, Yum! Brands, and Quaker Oats, was appointed as CEO. On September 29, 2019, Reed's Inc. and Valentin Stalowir entered into a separation agreement which became effective on October 31, 2019. As a result, John Bello temporarily assumed the position of CEO. In March 2020 Norman E. Snyder was appointed CEO.

In January 2018, Reed's Inc. put its Los Angeles manufacturing facility up for sale and plans to complete the sale by the end of the year. Chris Reed managed to obtain additional financing and spun the Los Angeles facility and its contract bottling off as California Custom Beverages Inc.

Reeds' Inc moved its corporate headquarters to Norwalk, Connecticut, in 2018. Reed's Inc. appointed several new executives, naming Iris Snyder as chief financial officer, Philip Trotman as director of marketing, and Beth Brown as director of supply chain and procurement.

== Products ==
In 2013, Reed's, Inc. announced that it would be labelling all of its products as GMO-free.

In 2017 and 2018, Reed's Inc. streamlined its product line from over 100 products to approximately 25, focusing on Reed's Inc. and Virgil's soft drinks. Reed's Inc. soft drink line has nine varieties while its ginger candy line has two varieties. Reed's Inc. products are sold in many retail outlets in the US and Canada. In 2021, Reed's Inc. began selling three of its soft drinks in resealable plastic bottles. Virgil's line includes thirteen varieties of soft drinks.

== Notable events ==
Reed's Inc. Spiced Apple Brew has won the "Outstanding Beverage Finalist" at the National Association for the Specialty Food Trade. Reed's Inc. Original Ginger Brew has won the "Outstanding Beverage Finalist" from the National Association for the Specialty Food Trade and the "Best Imported Food Product" from the Canadian Fancy Food Association.

Reed's Inc. was selected by WholeFoods Magazine as the Runner Up Beverage Company in the Natural Choice Awards of 2010 and 2011.

Virgil's Root Beer won the "Outstanding Beverage" award at the International Fancy Food and Confection Show in 1994, 1996 and 1997.

== See also ==
- Craft soda
