= New York, Auburn and Lansing Railroad =

Interurban railroad in the early 20th century

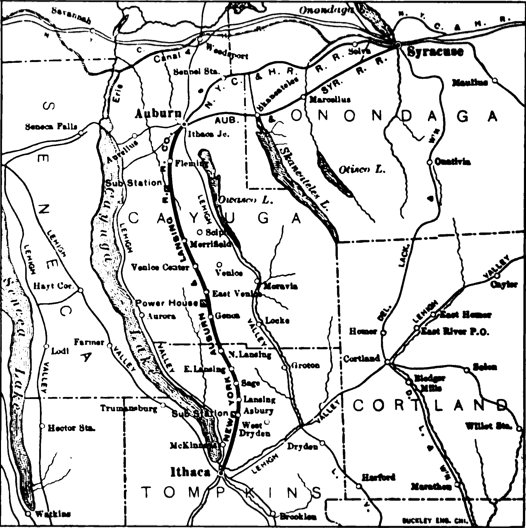
A map showing the New York, Auburn and Lansing Railroad and connections in 1907.

The New York, Auburn and Lansing Railroad, also known as the Ithaca-Auburn Short Line, was the only interurban line to operate in Tompkins County, New York.

== Origins ==
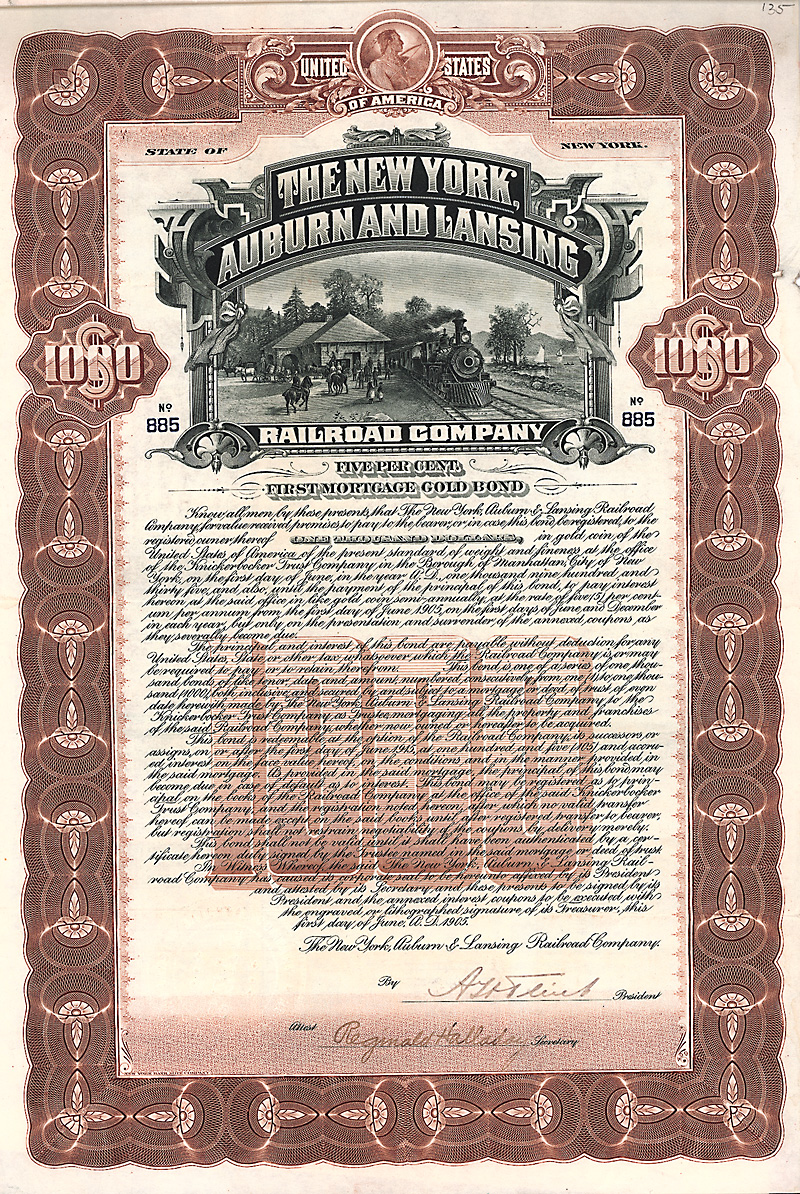
Bond of the New York, Auburn and Lansing Railroad from the 1st June 1905

Promoted by Albert H. Flint, the New York, Auburn and Lansing Railroad was chartered on March 16, 1900. It was to re-use the old "Murdock Line", a rail grade which had briefly seen service as part of the Auburn Branch of the New York and Oswego Midland Railroad, to connect Ithaca and Auburn, and would enter Ithaca via a friendly connection with the Ithaca Street Railway.

The road was conceived of as a third-rail-powered interurban, but as the expense proved prohibitive, the line was only electrified between Ithaca and South Lansing, using overhead wire. Operations north of there were run by steam. The line used the Ithaca street railway's Tioga Street line from its terminus between State and Seneca streets in Ithaca to the north side of Percy Field (current site of Ithaca High School), then climbed out of the Lake Cayuga basin through Renwick and Twin Glens, parallel to and below the current New York State Route 13, and reached the Murdock Line grade at South Lansing. It followed the grade north through the hamlets of Genoa, Venice, Scipio and Mapleton. On the outskirts of Auburn, it swung east from the former Ithaca, Auburn and Western Railroad grade (which had built from the end of the Midland's Auburn Branch at Scipio to Genoa Jct., just west of Auburn) and reached a connection with the Lehigh Valley Railroad just within the city limits of Auburn. Construction began in 1906 from the Auburn end, and reached South Lansing on March 1, 1908. The line into Ithaca was opened on December 12, 1908.

== Operations ==
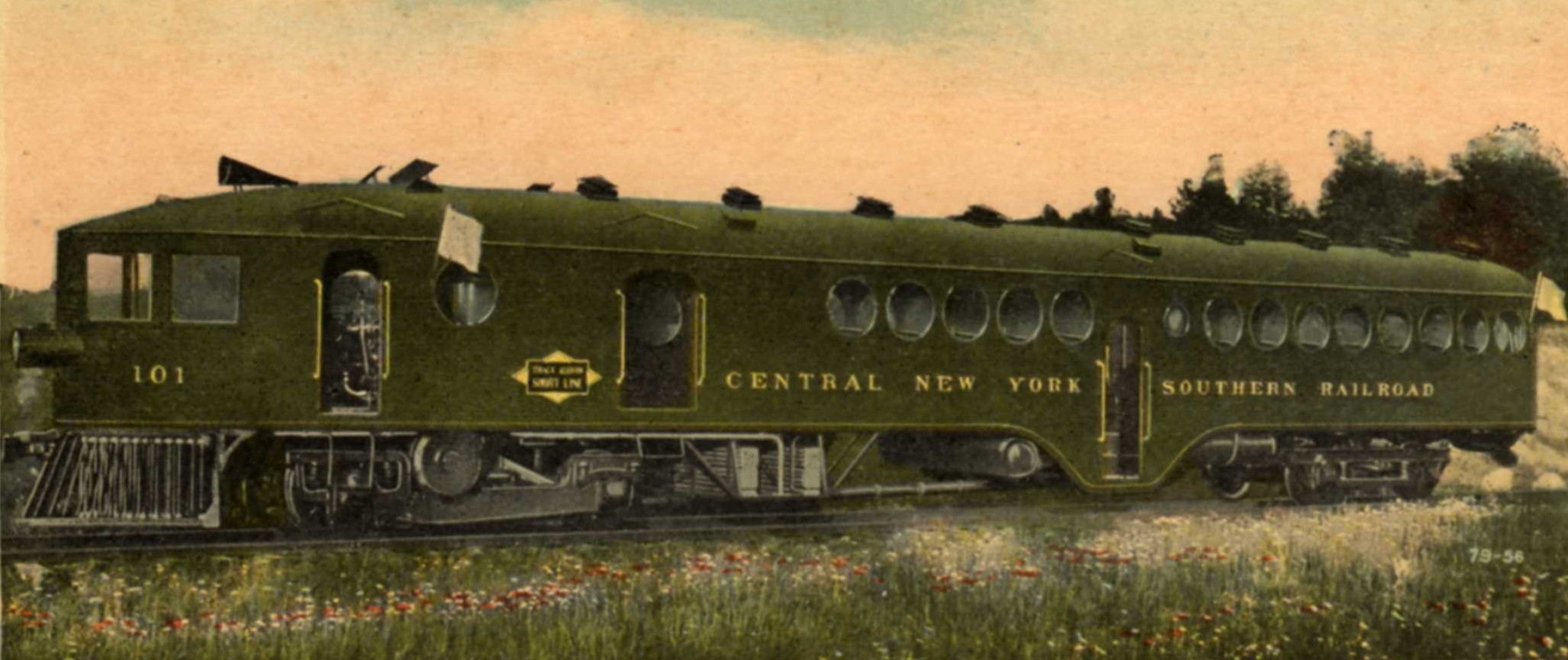
McKeen Car 101.

Service between Ithaca and South Lansing was operated with streetcars leased from the Ithaca Street Railway. An interchange track with the Lehigh Valley was laid at Remington, near the base of the hill, but the steep grade and limited tractive capacity of the streetcars meant that business was minimal. Service from South Lansing to Auburn was steam-operated. In 1909, a 0.5-mile branch was built by Col. J.V. McIntyre, owner of the Rogues' Harbor Inn, from his establishment to South Lansing. This was also electrified, and regular service from Ithaca to Rogues' Harbor Inn was established.

Throughout its life, the Short Line (as it was known to residents) faced stiff competition from the Lehigh Valley's Ithaca & Auburn Branch. The two-car maximum up the hill out of Ithaca effectively guaranteed to the LV the freight business of Ithaca, but the Short Line offered four trains a day between Ithaca and Auburn, against two for the Lehigh Valley. However, the Short Line lacked the financial resources of the Lehigh Valley, and struggled in the harsh upstate winters. It went into receivership in 1912 and was reorganized as the Central New York Southern Railroad in 1914 (organized May 28; property of NYA&L conveyed July 14). At this time the initial grade out of Ithaca was eased somewhat with the construction of an S-shaped approach from Percy Field, replacing the use of the steeper Cayuga Heights loop of the Ithaca Street Railway; this is the abutment over East Shore Drive that is still in place. This gentler grade allowed the use of gas-powered McKeen cars through to Auburn, so that passengers no longer needed to change from electric to steam in South Lansing. The purchase of two McKeen cars to speed the Ithaca-Auburn run could not put off insolvency forever. However, because the City of Ithaca refused permission for the McKeen cars to run down Tioga Street, passengers from downtown Ithaca still had to transfer, now at a spur on the east side of Percy Field, just below the Lakeview Cemetery. The Rogues Harbor spur was closed on October 19, 1920, and the last run on the main line was made on October 19, 1923. The railroad was formally abandoned in 1924, and rail was removed in 1925, except for the line from Ithaca to Remington, which was operated by the Ithaca Traction Corporation to serve a powerhouse until 1931.

== Relics ==
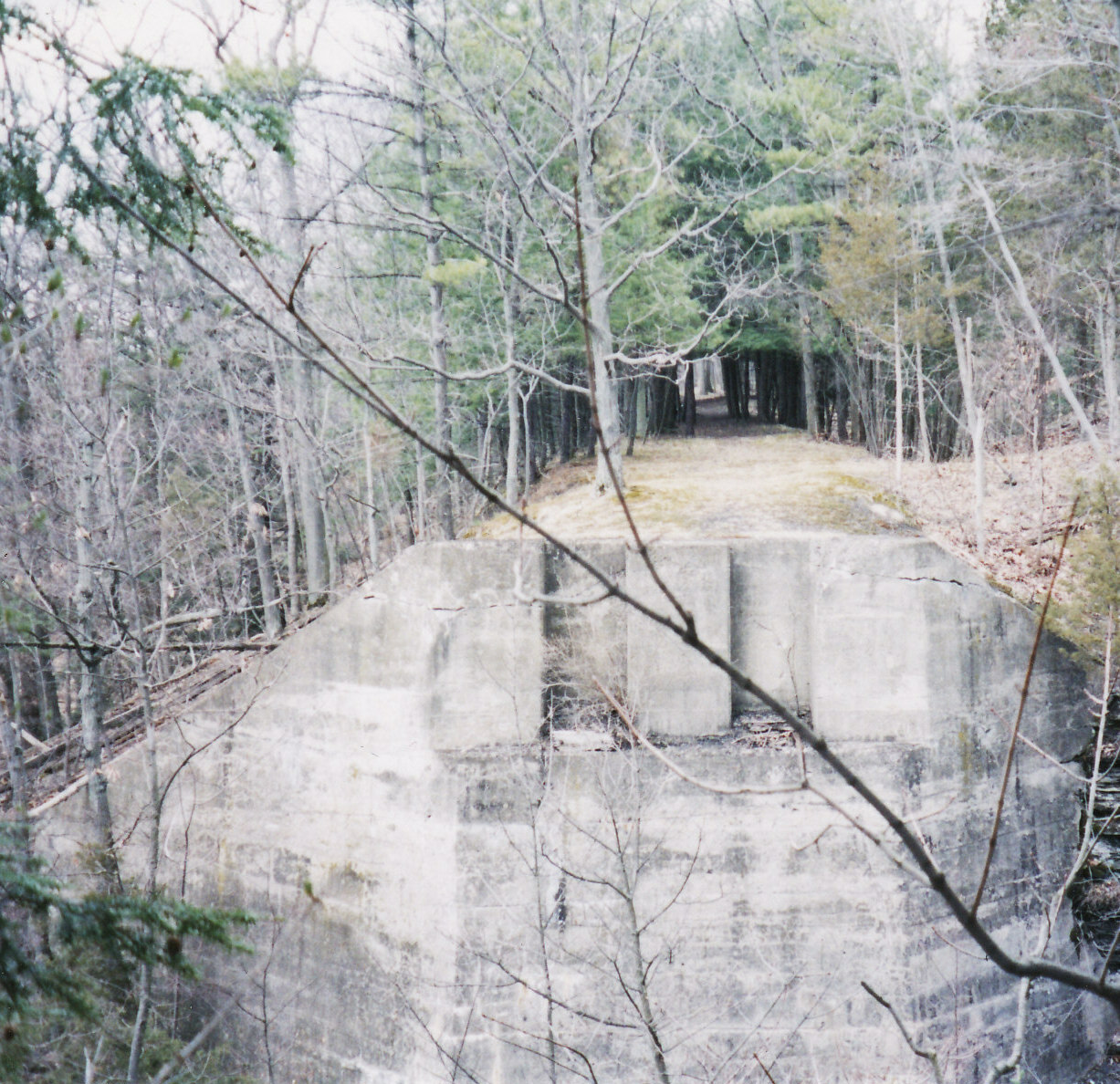
A Short Line abutment at Twin Glens

Much of the grade is still visible along the length of the route, though occasionally cleared for agriculture or new development in towns. In Ithaca, the roadbed is used for sewer access and maintenance, and has been proposed as the route of the East Shore Trail. In North Lansing, a fill constructed by the Short Line over Beardsley's Gulf (the valley of Locke Creek), replacing a 480-foot trestle of its predecessors, still remains.
