= Plainville, Connecticut =

- Town
- Town of Plainville
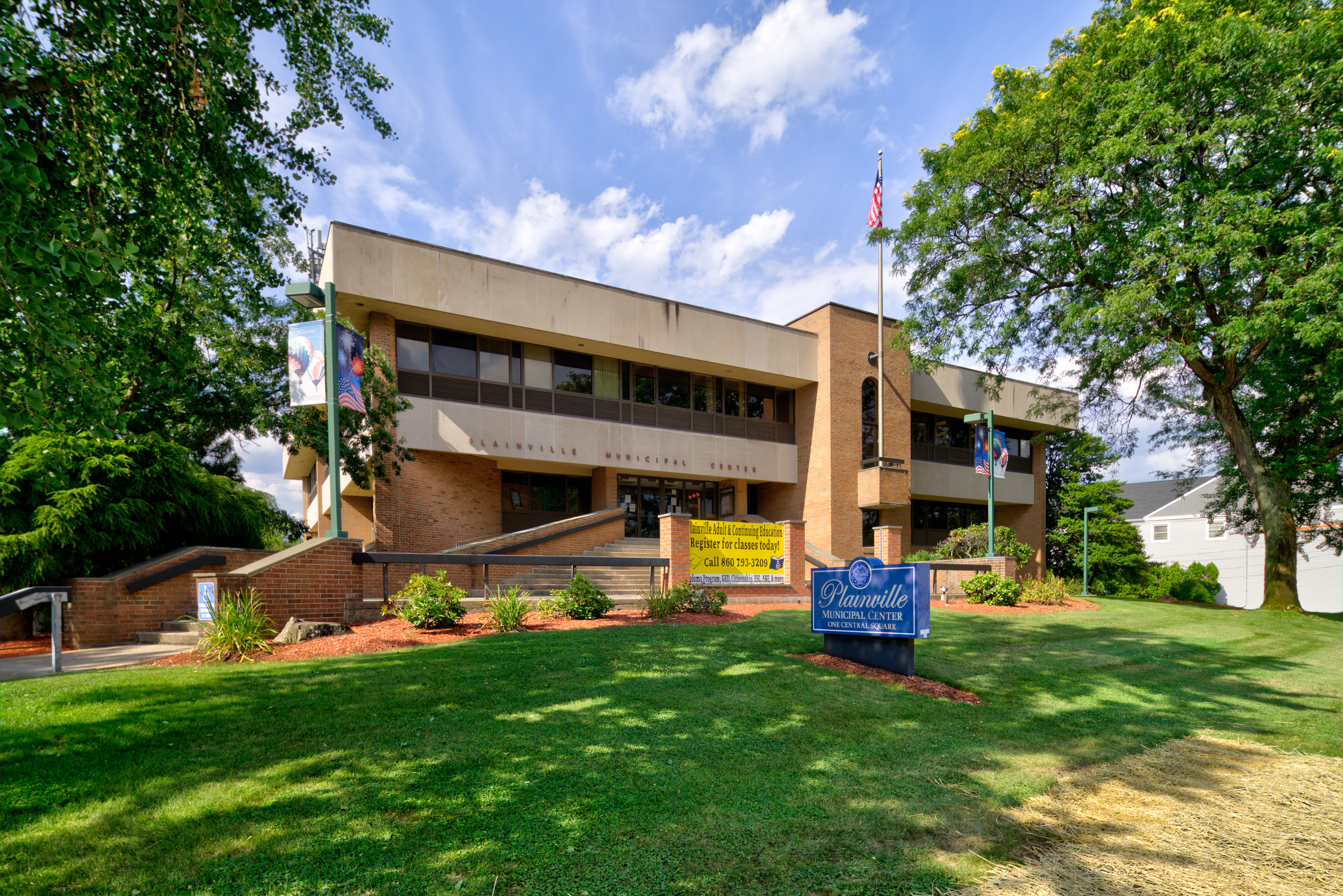
- Plainville Municipal Center

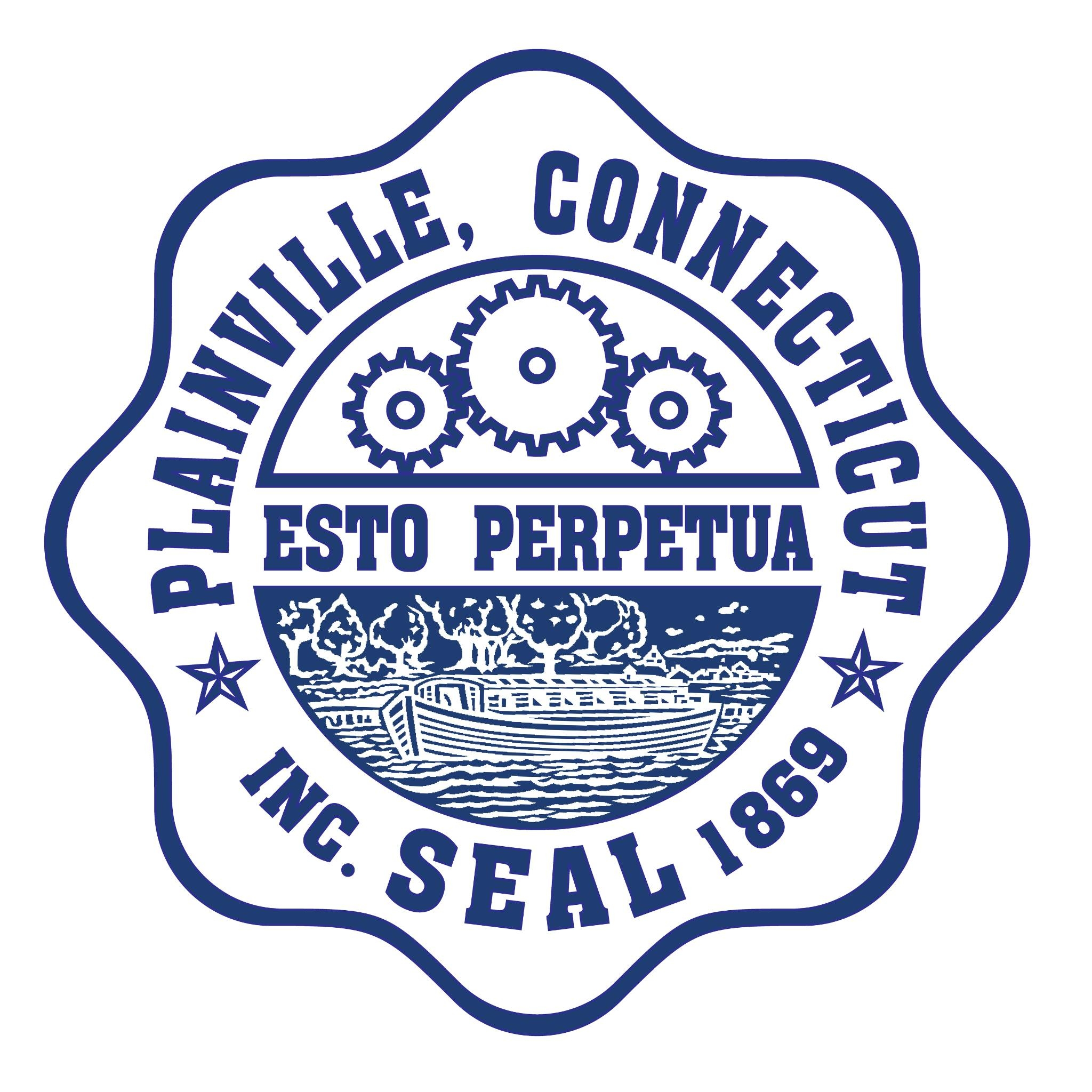
- Seal

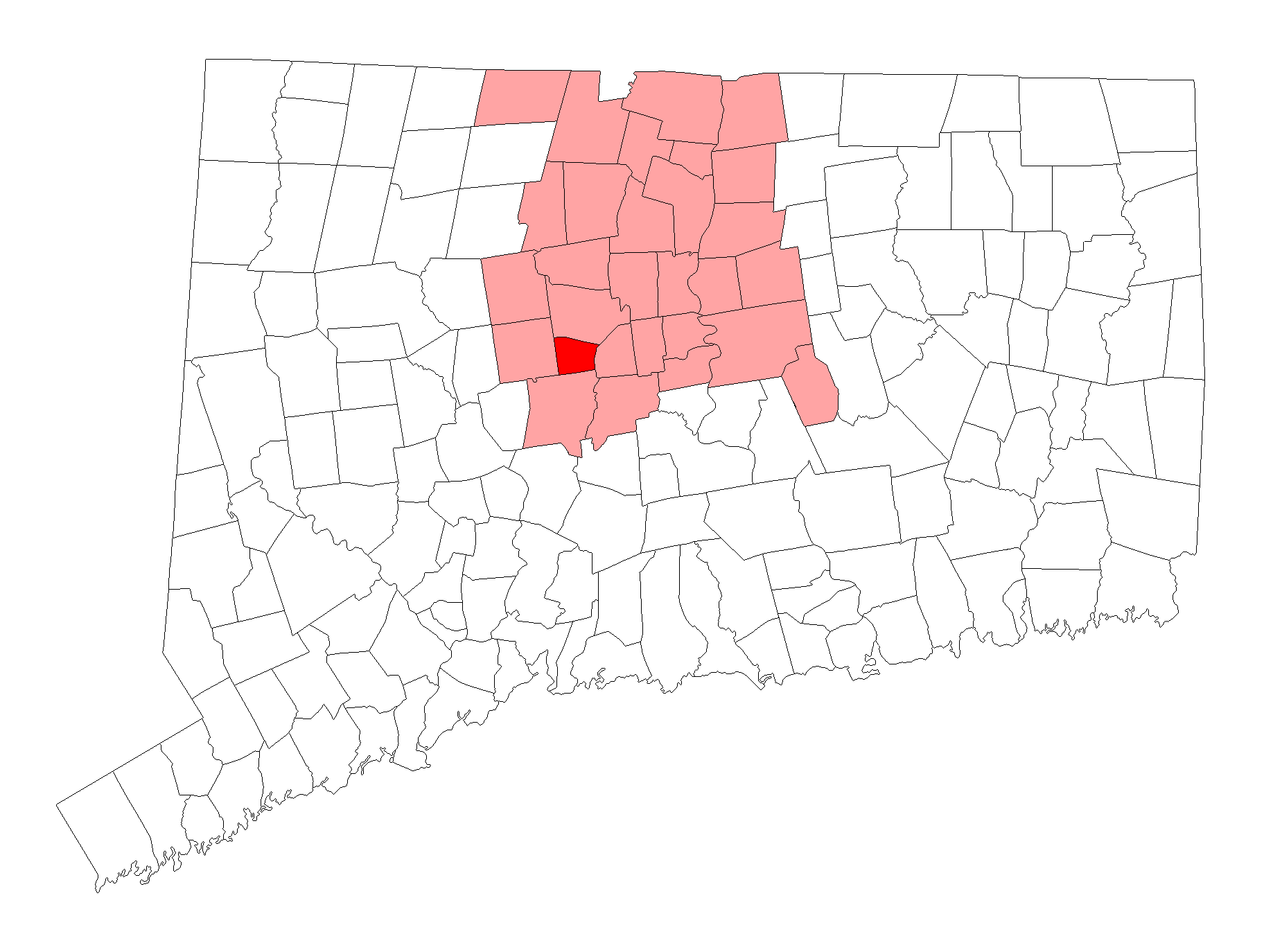
- Coordinates: 41°40′29″N 72°51′25″W
- Country: United States
- U.S. state: Connecticut
- County: Hartford
- Region: Capitol Region

Government
  - Type: Council-manager
  - Town Manager: Michael T. Paulhus
  - Town Council: Christopher Wazorko (D), Chairman; Rosemary Morante (D), Vice-Chairwoman; Rachel Buchanan (R); Quinn Christopher (D); Benjamin Gediman (D); Daniel Hurley (D); Deborah Tompkins (R)

Area
  - Total: 9.8 sq mi (25.3 km^{2})
  - Land: 9.7 sq mi (25.2 km^{2})
  - Water: 0.077 sq mi (0.2 km^{2})
- Elevation: 190 ft (58 m)

Population (2020)
  - Total: 17,525
  - Density: 1,800/sq mi (695/km^{2})
- Time zone: UTC-5 (Eastern)
  - Summer (DST): UTC-4 (Eastern)
- ZIP Code: 06062
- Area codes: 860/959
- FIPS code: 09-60120
- GNIS feature ID: 0213488
- Website: www.plainville-ct.gov

Plainville is a town in Hartford County, Connecticut, United States. The town is part of the Capitol Planning Region. The population was 17,525 at the 2020 census.

== History ==
Plainville first was inhabited by Europeans around 1650. By the 1660s, the land was incorporated as land for nearby Farmington. In the year 1869, it separated from Farmington due to the distance of the town center and the growth of Plainville downtown due to the installation of the New York, New Haven and Hartford Railroad and the Hartford, Providence, and Fishkill Railroad.

== Geography ==
According to the United States Census Bureau, the town has a total area of 25.3 square kilometres (9.8 sq mi), of which 9.7 square miles (25.2 km^{2}) is land and 0.077 square mile (0.2 km^{2}), or 0.72%, is water. The east side of the town is bordered by two prominent peaks of the Metacomet Ridge: Pinnacle Rock and Bradley Mountain. The 51-mile (82 km) Metacomet Trail traverses those peaks.

== Demographics ==
Historical population
Year	Pop.	±%
1870	1,433	—
1880	1,930	+34.7%
1890	1,993	+3.3%
1900	2,189	+9.8%
1910	2,882	+31.7%
1920	4,114	+42.7%
1930	6,301	+53.2%
1940	6,935	+10.1%
1950	9,994	+44.1%
1960	13,149	+31.6%
1970	16,733	+27.3%
1980	16,401	−2.0%
1990	17,392	+6.0%
2000	17,328	−0.4%
2010	17,716	+2.2%
2020	17,525	−1.1%

As of the census of 2020, there were 17,525 people, 8,187 households, and 4,565 families residing in the town. The population density was 1,800 inhabitants per square mile (690/km^{2}). The racial makeup of the town was 87.1% White, 1.7% Black or African American, 0.9% Native American, 4.0% Asian, 0.00% Pacific Islander, and 1.3% from two or more races. Hispanic or Latino of any race were 10.3% of the population.

There were 8,187 households, out of which 60.1% were married couples living together, 13.5% had a female householder with no husband present, 5.8% had a male householder with no wife present, and 20.7% were non-families, such as single person households. The average household size was 2.32 and the average family size was 2.97.

In the town, the population was spread out, with 19.8% under the age of 19, 6.0% from 20 to 24, 25.9% from 25 to 44, 29.1% from 45 to 64, and 19.2% who were 65 years of age or older. The median age was 43.8 years. For every 100 males, there were 106.8 females.

The median income for a household in the town was $70,012. The per capita income for the town was $40,869. About 6.2% of the population were below the poverty line, including 10.0% of those under age 18 and 8.0% of those age 65 or over.

The median home value was $219,700 and median rent was $1,027. 68.0% of the population own, while 32.0% rent. About 61.0% of housing structures were single unit, 38.0% were multi-unit, and 1.0% were other, such as mobile homes.

== Economy ==
Plainville highlights

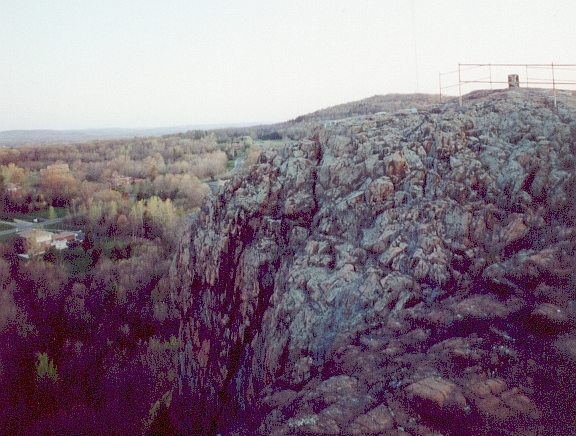
Pinnacle Rock

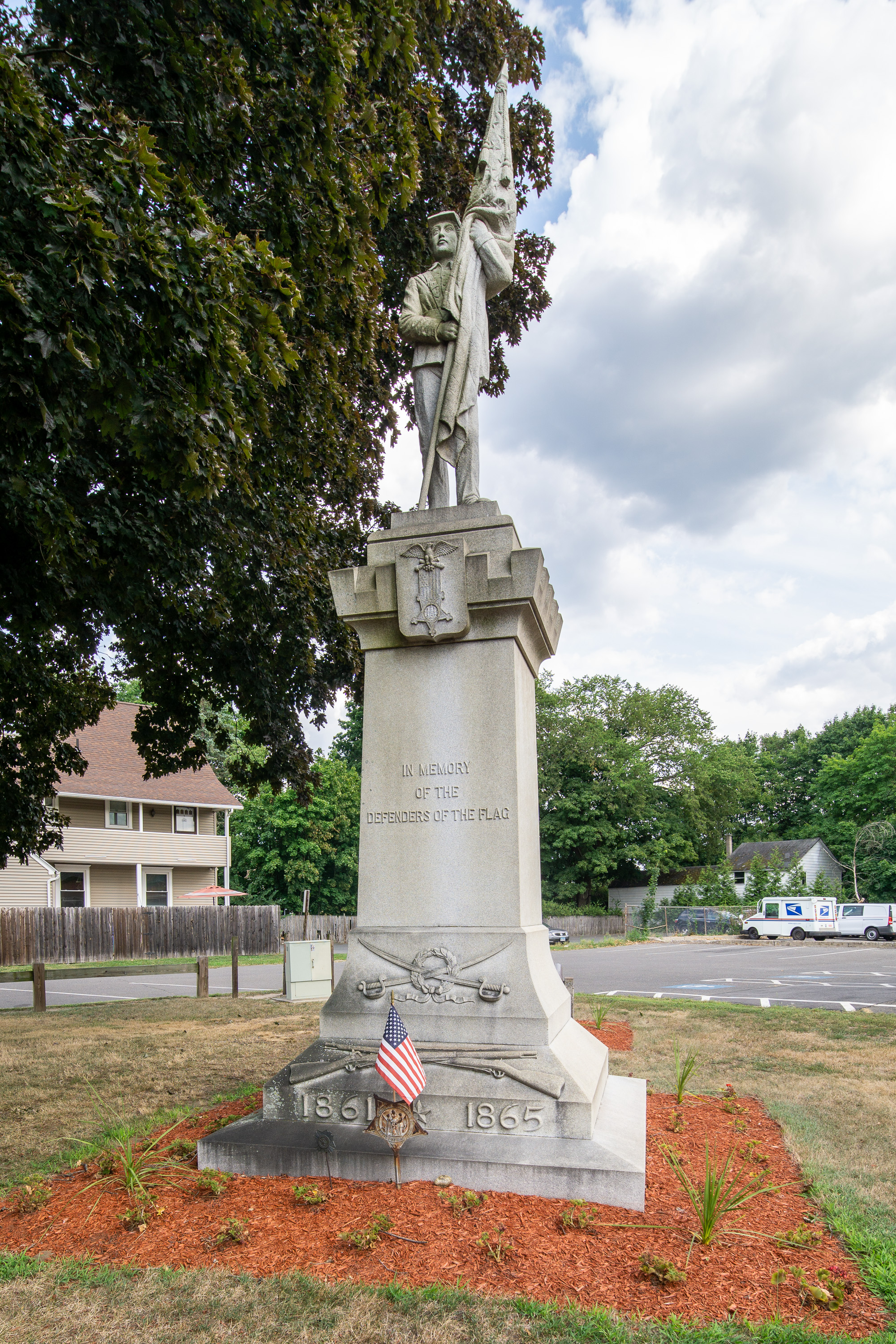
Civil War memorial

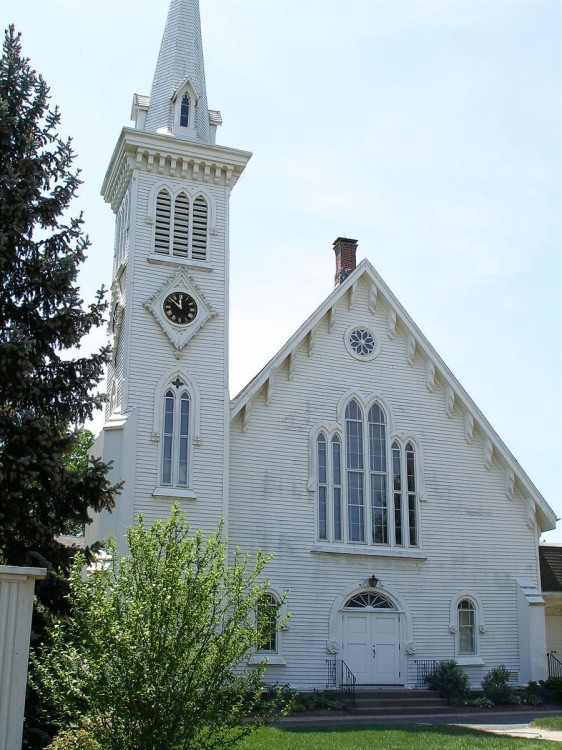
Congregational Church of Plainville

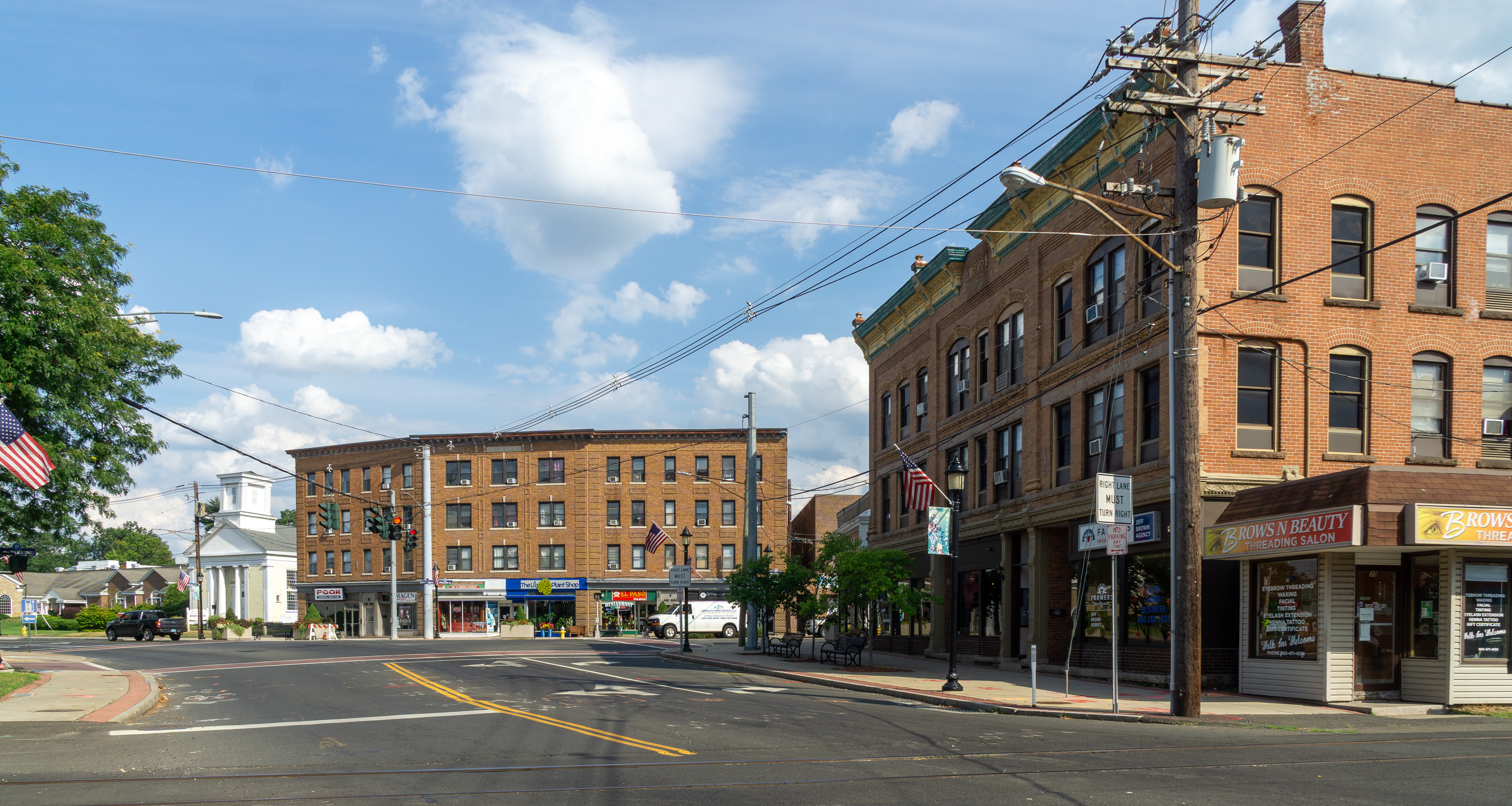
Downtown

Top employers in Plainville according to the town's 2022 Comprehensive Annual Financial Report.

#	Employer	# of employees
1	Town of Plainville	522
2	Manafort Construction	515
3	Tilcon Connecticut Inc.	430
4	Wheeler Clinic Inc	425
5	GEMS Sensors	245
6	Carling Technologies Inc	217
7	Loureiro Engineering	205
8	Mizzy Construction	198
9	Midwest Electric	165
10	Ferguson Electric	159

There were approximately 2,007 active businesses in Plainville as of 2021. Key employers includes, Wheeler Clinic, Manafort Bros. Construction, Gems Sensors & Controls, Tilcon Connecticut, and Americold. Major industries are health care, manufacturing, construction, and retail.

The town of Plainville is one of the few municipalities to own its own airport, Robertson Field.

== Arts and culture ==
Plainville holds an annual Hot Air Balloon Festival at the end of August at Norton Park, gathering many of the townspeople together for fun-filled nights of games, music, and fireworks. The event is sponsored by the Plainville Fire Company.

Plainville hosts an annual PumpkinFest in October. This event is a downtown, outdoor festival featuring live music, a kid's costume parade, games, a large variety of food trucks, a haunted house, and many local vendors, downtown restaurants, and businesses.

The Mega Metacomet Halloween Thriller is an annual community-based Halloween event held on Metacomet Road in Plainville. The event began as a small one home display and has since grown into Connecticut's largest neighborhood decorated for Halloween. It features choreographed performances of Michael Jackson's "Thriller", large-scale and immersive home decorations with synchronized lighting and sound. The celebration also serves as a major food drive for the Plainville Community Food Pantry collecting over four tons of food as of 2025. In recognition of its cultural and charitable impact, the event has received several honors, including the Skeleton Key to the City from the Plainville Town Council, a proclamation by the Connecticut General Assembly naming it the state's top Halloween attraction, and an official statement from Governor Ned Lamont commending both the event and the Town of Plainville.

In June at Robertson Field, the airport hosts the annual Plainville Wings & Wheels fly-in and car show. This event supports the Petit Family Foundation and the Plainville Community Food Pantry.

Plainville has also been something of a minor transportation hub. In the nineteenth century, Plainville was served by the Farmington Canal. It also sits on the intersection of two rail lines, one running north from New Haven and the other running east–west between Waterbury and Berlin. Finally, Plainville is the home of Robertson Field, the oldest private airport in Connecticut.

The town is home to the Plainville United travel soccer team, with CJSA Connecticut State Championships won in 2014 and 2023 by the boys teams. Soccer in Plainville is rapidly growing, and has become the link between community and outdoor activity.

== Education ==
Plainville has three elementary schools: Louis Toffolon School, Frank T. Wheeler School, and Linden Street School.

There is one middle school, the Middle School of Plainville, which serves grades 6 to 8. The middle school adopts the same mascot and colors as the town high school. As of 2026, the middle school is under renovations, and is due to be completed by 2028.

Plainville High School is the only town high school. The school mascot is the Blue Devil, and the colors are blue and white, similar to the nearby Central Connecticut State University. The town's High School is rich in sports history, with vast successes in the past and present. The Plainville High School soccer team won the CIAC State Championship in 2018, and have been strong competitors in the CCC since. The Plainville High School cheer team are Central Connecticut Conference Grand Champions, having won the title in 2017, 2018, 2019, 2020, & 2022. They were CIAC co-ed champions in 2019 and placed top 3 in New England in 2022.

== Government ==
Plainville is run by a Town Manager/Town Council form of government. Michael Paulhus is the current town manager (as of 2022). The Town Council comprises seven members elected every two years. The Municipal Center is located at 1 Central Square near the center of town.

Plainville town vote by party in presidential elections
Year	Democratic	Republican	Third parties
2020	48.41% 4,670	49.87% 4,811	1.72% 166
2016	43.69% 3,802	51.61% 4,492	4.70% 409
2012	57.04% 4,540	41.68% 3,318	1.28% 102
2008	58.69% 4,983	39.86% 3,384	1.45% 123
2004	55.40% 4,403	42.87% 3,407	1.72% 137
2000	61.75% 4,574	32.86% 2,434	5.39% 399
1996	58.39% 4,379	27.63% 2,072	13.98% 1,048
1992	43.33% 3,763	30.74% 2,669	25.93% 2,252
1988	52.38% 3,869	46.68% 3,448	0.95% 70
1984	40.60% 3,013	58.99% 4,378	0.42% 31
1980	45.12% 3,215	41.69% 2,971	13.19% 940
1976	52.38% 3,779	47.07% 3,396	0.55% 40
1972	42.43% 3,100	56.21% 4,107	1.37% 100
1968	54.34% 3,626	40.16% 2,680	5.50% 367
1964	73.61% 4,618	26.39% 1,656	0.00% 0
1960	54.95% 3,422	45.05% 2,806	0.00% 0
1956	35.34% 2,055	64.66% 3,760	0.00% 0

== Notable people ==
- John Bello (born 1946), founder and former CEO of SoBe; president of NFL Properties
- Ted Christopher (1958–2017), former NASCAR driver, known for his participation on the Whelen Modified Tour
- Lena Santos Ferguson (1928–2004), second African-American member of the Daughters of the American Revolution
- Pauline R. Kezer (born 1942), former Secretary of the State of Connecticut
- Niko Koutouvides (born 1981), former NFL linebacker
- Wendell Phillips Norton Sr. (1861–1955), inventor of a mechanical gear shift on the Hendy-Norton lathe
- Peter Portante (born 1996), racing driver
- Ursula von Rydingsuard (1942 - 2026) the leading sculptor was brought up here
- John Harper Trumbull (1873–1961), 70th governor of Connecticut
- Jennifer Homendy
