= Norman E. Snyder =

Norman E. Snyder Jr. is an American entrepreneur and philanthropist.

== Early life ==
Snyder was raised in Upstate New York, along with his brothers. He attended Lansing High School, approximately nine miles from Ithaca. Snyder graduated in 1983 from the State University of New York at Albany with a degree in accounting. He was a member of the international co-ed business fraternity Delta Sigma Pi, Zeta Psi chapter.

== Career ==
Snyder spent eight years at the accounting firm Price Waterhouse, including two years in the Caracas, Venezuela office. He worked for five years with National Football League Properties, the marketing arm of the NFL, where he served as controller. In 1995, Snyder joined South Beach Beverage Company as chief operating officer. Following the sale of SoBe to PepsiCo in 2001 for $370 million, he founded a consulting firm Redyns. Snyder was later chief operating officer at Rheingold Brewing prior to its sale to Drinks Americas in 2005. In 2020, he was appointed chief executive officer at Reed's.

== Philanthropy ==
On October 17, 2005, Snyder committed $5 million to the School of Business at the University at Albany to establish the Norman E. Snyder Jr. '83 Endowment Fund. The fund was used for general support of the business school, and the donation was, at the time, the largest gift from an individual in the history of the University.
