= John Bello =

American entrepreneur (born 1946)

- Born: John Joseph Bello; March 30, 1946 (age 80); New Britain, Connecticut, U.S.
- Education: Tufts University
- Occupations: Entrepreneur, business executive
- Known for: President, NFL Properties Creator of SoBe
- Spouse: Nancy Bello

John Joseph Bello (born March 30, 1946) is an American entrepreneur best known for creating and building the SoBe brand of New Age beverages.

== Early life ==
Bello grew up in Plainville, Connecticut, the son of the late Generoso "Jerry" and Edith (Melito) Bello. He is a 1964 graduate of Plainville High School in Plainville, Connecticut, where he played football, was student council president and was named to The National Honor Society. Bello went on to matriculate at Tufts University in Medford, Massachusetts, on a Navy ROTC scholarship. There, he played football for two years, was a member of Delta Upsilon fraternity, and played drums in a rock band called "The What Four." He earned a bachelor's degree cum laude in history in 1968. While at Tufts he also met the former Nancy Nelson, to whom he was married in 1969.

== Naval career ==
Upon his graduation from Tufts, Bello was commissioned an ensign in the United States Navy and served a four-year tour that included a tour of duty in South Vietnam as supply officer for PBR Mobile Base II on the Mekong Delta with a mission of combat support for several Patrol Boat, River (PBR) squadrons. He was awarded the Navy Commendation Medal with Combat V for meritorious service. In 1972, after Vietnam, Bello was assigned to the Moffett Field Naval Air Station Moffett Field as the Navy Exchange Officer. He resigned his commission as a Lieutenant to attend graduate school.

== Early business career ==
Bello entered the Amos Tuck School at Dartmouth College, graduating with an MBA in 1974. While at Tuck he was named an Edward Tuck Scholar. After Tuck, his first business position was in brand management at General Foods, where he worked on Sanka and Maxwell House coffee brands. After an interim experience in athletic footwear as product director for Keds Brand footwear, he moved on to a strategic planning and marketing functions in the Pepsi Cola Division of PepsiCo where he worked on Mountain Dew and the Pepsi Challenge.

== National Football League Properties ==
In 1979, he joined NFL Properties (NFLP), the marketing and merchandising arm of the National Football League, where he ascended to the position of president of NFL Properties in 1986. At NFLP, he helped transform licensed apparel from a small business selling novelty merchandise in specialty stores into everyday fashion transcending fan-wear, sold at major chain sporting goods and department stores. In addition to creating NFL ProLine authentic sideline gear and apparel made available to consumers to so that they could "Wear What the Pros Wear", Bello drove major sponsorships with Coca-Cola, Canon, Gatorade, Miller Brewing, GTE, Apple, Citibank, American Airlines and many consumer food products through a Sunday insert program called the "NFL Tailgate Party." He also played a major role in creating the NFL Experience, a fan festival that is now a fixture and fan favorite at Super Bowls. Also, Bello helped organize the American Bowl series of international pre-season games starting with the 1986 game between the Refrigerator Perry-led Super Bowl Champion Chicago Bears and Dallas Cowboys played in front of 81,000 fans at London's Wembley Stadium. Bello's innovative approach to promoting and enhancing the NFL experience included bedecking pro golfer Payne Stewart in NFL Team colors as he played on the tour, sponsoring NASCAR racers, women's lines of NFL team clothing and made for TV events such as the Quarterback Challenge and The NFL's Fastest Man.

During Bello's tenure at NFLP, the business grew from $30 million in retail sales, sponsorships and publishing to $3 billion when he left in 1993. Bello is broadly credited with creating the model by which every major sports league now operates. He was ranked 46th on Sporting News' list of Most Powerful People in Sports in 1992.

Bello left NFLP on Labor Day in 1993 amid controversy. He resigned as a result of losing a power struggle with then-NFL Commissioner Paul Tagliabue who was seeking to consolidate league operations, including the previously independent NFL Properties under the commissioner's office.

== SoBe Beverages ==
Upon his departure from the NFL, Bello took a position as VP Marketing with Brooklyn, New York-based Ferolito, Vultaggio and Sons, makers of AriZona iced tea. At AriZona he joined a former Pepsi colleague Mike Schott, then COO of AriZona Beverages. After four months he left AriZona to create his own beverage company in partnership with Tom Schwalm that became the South Beach Beverage Company, named after the trendy South Beach area of Miami.

The new company, based in Norwalk, Connecticut, marketed so-called "New Age" beverages—exotic juice blends and ready-to-drink iced teas—but faced formidable competition from its predecessors, including Snapple, Mystic, Nantucket Nectars and AriZona. South Beach needed a point of differentiation in the marketplace, so Bello added trace elements of various herbs and nutrients—such as ginseng, ginkgo biloba, guarana, carnitine, Echinacea, yohimbe, taurine and praline—and promoted their benefits beyond hydration. He launched a "3G" line of drinks, which included supposed energy boosters like ginseng, ginkgo biloba and guarana. He also expanded the brand's iced tea portfolio to include more exotic offerings such as Black Tea, Oolong Tea (with bee pollen), Green Tea (with Echinacea) and Red Tea (with selenium). Under Bello's direction, SoBe launched a line of "3C" Elixirs (containing calcium, carnitine and chromium) in varieties such as Orange-Carrot, Orange-Tomato (including lycopene), Energy (with guarana, yohimbe and arginine), Power (taurine, creatine and proline), Zen Blend (triple ginseng tea with schizandra), Wisdom (with ginkgo biloba, St. John's wort and gotu kola) and Eros (with dong quai, damiana, foti and zink). Other fun SoBe products included Lizzard Blizzard, Tsunami, Fierce, Courage and Long John Lizard’s Grape Grog.

He created the "dueling lizards" design and took a lead role in the company's guerrilla marketing effort, proclaiming himself as the "Lizard King" in radio advertisements. He gave the brand an "attitude" by enlisting athletes who were somewhat out of the mainstream—such as golfer John Daly and downhill skier Bode Miller—as official spokespersons for the brand. The SoBe marketing team also wooed independent beverage distributors, offering them very high margins and a small chunk of equity in the company.

From its creation in 1995, SoBe's sales rose rapidly and climbed to $275 million by 2000. The following year, the brand rode the "good-for-you" trend among American consumers to break the quarter billion dollar barrier in 2000. SoBe was sold to PepsiCo for a reported $370 million cash on October 30, 2000. Bello remained with Pepsi overseeing SoBe until early 2004.

By the end of 1999 the company had sold 14.8 million cases of drinks and taken in $166.4 million. South Beach challenged rival AriZona in sales and was pursuing Snapple for leadership in the new age drink category. Less than pleased, rival AriZona slapped the company with a lawsuit claiming that SoBe had copied its bottle design or stolen trade secrets. Then Judge Sonia Sotomayor ruled in SoBe's favor denying a preliminary injunction. Legal action proceeded and persisted on the federal and state level until 2007, long after the company had been sold to PepsiCo. In 2007, the court dismissed all AriZona claims on summary judgement

In 2001, Bello was named Ernst and Young's National Entrepreneur of the Year in the Consumer Products category for his accomplishments at SoBe.

== Other business activity ==
Upon leaving Pepsi, Bello formed JoNa Ventures, a family investment vehicle that included among other endeavors investment and active involvement in Firefighter Brands, Soup Kitchen International, Eye and PresbyopiaTherapies and Beso Del Sol Sangria.

With former NFL associates Bruce Burke and Peter French, Bello formed Firefighter Brands, a social enterprise intended to benefit local firefighting units with revenues generated from the sale of Firefighter Branded coffee, chips, chili's, trail mixes and energy drinks. The project was supported by a group of well to do and high-profile community minded investors but ultimately failed due to lack of cohesive co-operation among various firefighting entities.

In 2005, Bello invested in and became chairman of Soup Kitchen International, a company he helped found that markets soups created by Al Yeganeh, the New York-based soup chef made famous as the "Soup Nazi" on the popular Seinfeld TV show, for retail stores, and developed franchised restaurants.

In 2006 Bello became a general partner of Sherbrooke Capital, a venture capital firm that provides growth capital to early-stage health and wellness companies that led the $6.35 million equity-financing round for IZZE in early 2005. In the spring of 2006, Bello was appointed Chairman of the Board of the IZZE Beverage Company, a maker of sparkling juices. Izze was subsequently sold to PepsiCo for an undisclosed sum. Currently, Bello is in partnership with his college roommate and fraternity brother Dr. Lee Nordan serving as chairman of Eye Therapies. ET is a development and marketing company for products in the OTC ocular care and cosmetic market. In addition, Bello led an investor group that owns a substantial interest in Beso Del Sol, a line of all natural sangrias imported from Spain. He serves as chairman of the board in that enterprise. In 2016 Bello was elected chairman of the board of Reed's Inc.(REED, NYSE - since delisted and now OTC), a publicly traded company. Formed in 1989, Reed's manufactures and markets a line of ginger beers and naturally brewed soft drinks under the Virgil's brand name.

== Personal life ==
Bello's outside activities include: charter trustee, Tufts University; board of advisors for athletics, Tufts University; board member, Dartmouth College's Tuck Center for Private Equity; board member Gordon Entrepreneurial Institute at Tufts University and board of directors, New York Council Boy Scouts of America and former trustee, the Hotchkiss School. He has lectured at colleges and MBA programs including Tuck, NYU, Yale, Cornell, Georgetown, Tufts, Dartmouth, Gonzaga and at high schools and at business forums and symposiums about his NFL and SoBe experiences and entrepreneurship.

Bello resides in Scottsdale, Arizona, and Rye, New York, with his wife Nancy. The couple has three grown children, Lauren, Lindsay and John. As well as four grandchildren, Benjamin, Archibald, Beatrix and Poppy.
