= Lansing High School =

Coordinates: 42.544165°N 76.533895°W

Location
- 300 Ridge Road; Lansing, Tompkins County, New York 14882; United States

Information
- School type: Public, Secondary
- Established: 1930
- School district: Lansing Central School District
- Superintendent: Chris Pettograsso
- Principal: Patrick Hornbrook
- Staff: 37.77 (FTE)
- Grades: 9-12
- Enrollment: 375 (approx.)
- Student to teacher ratio: 10.22
- Colors: Blue and Gold
- Mascot: Bobcat
- Information: (607) 533-3020
- Website: lansingschools.org

Lansing High School is a public high school in Lansing, New York, United States. The school is located on the eastern shore of Cayuga Lake in the Finger Lakes region of Upstate New York, approximately nine miles from Ithaca.

Lansing High School has an enrollment of approximately 375 students, with slightly under one hundred students in each graduating class. The school district consists of one high school, one middle school, and one elementary school.

Lansing High School's colors are blue and gold, and the school mascot is the bobcat, otherwise known as the Lansing Bobcats.

== Academics ==
Lansing High School offers Advanced Placement Courses, which include: Art, Biology, Calculus AB, Computer Science, English, French, Music Theory I, Spanish, and Statistics.

Lansing High School follows the New York State Public School's graduation requirements. Students can receive a local diploma, a regents diploma, or a regents diploma with advanced designation.

== Athletics ==
- In 2000, Shawn Costello won the New York State High School Golf Championship.
- In 2001, Girls Varsity Basketball won the New York State High School Basketball Championship.
- In 2005 and 2007, John Duthie won the New York State High School Golf Championship.
- In 2012, Connor Lapresi won the New York State High School Wrestling Championship (132 lb.).
- In 2012, Boys Varsity Baseball won the New York State High School Baseball Championship with a 26–0 record.
- In 2017 and 2018, Boys Varsity Soccer won the New York State High School Soccer Championship.
- In 2023, Girls Varsity Volleyball won the New York State High School Volleyball Championship.
- In 2025, Trent Thibault won the New York State High School Cross Country Championship.

== Music ==
Lansing High School has a mixed chorus, a varsity chorale, a band, an orchestra, a symphony orchestra, and various a cappella groups that are student run.

== Notable alumni ==
- Kyle Dake, four-time World Champion freestyle wrestler and bronze medalist at the 2020 and 2024 Summer Olympics
- Tim DeKay, actor and star of the USA Network comedy-drama White Collar
- Norman E. Snyder Jr., entrepreneur, philanthropist, and former chief operating officer at SoBe
- Christopher Woodrow, Hollywood movie producer known for Birdman, Black Mass, and Hacksaw Ridge
