= Daniel D. Minier =

American major general

Major General Daniel D. Minier
- Portrait of General Daniel D. Minier, New York State Militia. Courtesy of George Eastman House, International Museum of Photography and Film
- Born: 1794; Lansing, New York
- Died: 1849 (aged 54–55)
- Military career
- Allegiance: United States
- Branch: New York State Militia
- Rank: Major General
- Commands: Infantry division

Daniel D. Minier (1794–1849), of Lansing, New York, was an American who served as a major general in the New York State Militia, Infantry division.

His father, Abram Minier, and uncle, Daniel Minier, were original Lake Country settlers in 1787.

On family land, Minier constructed the Central Exchange Hotel, the first brick structure in Lansing.

Minier died in 1849, and his remains were placed at Asbury Cemetery in Lansing.
