= Pinnacle Rock (Connecticut) =

Mountain in Connecticut, US

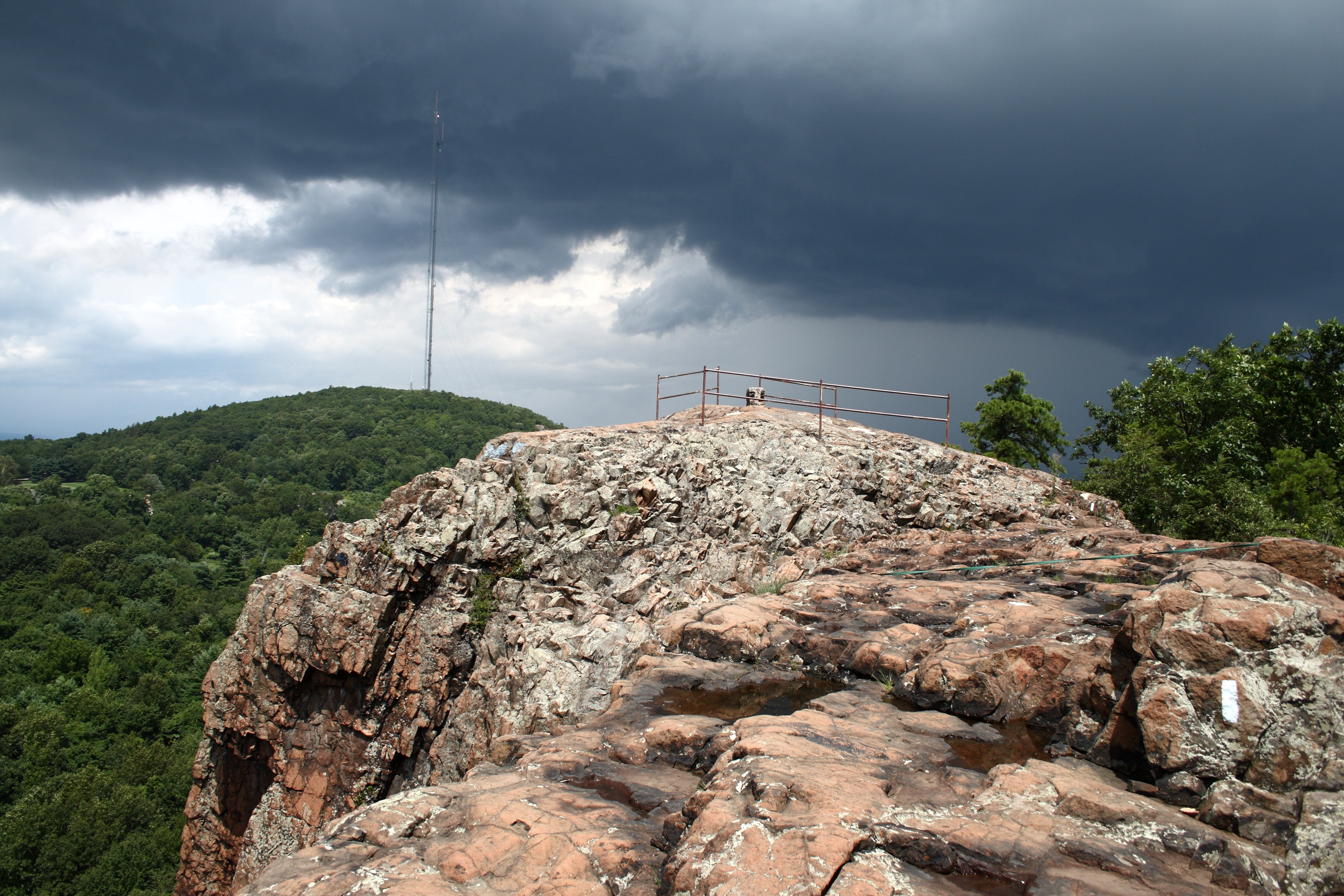
- The summit of Pinnacle Rock, with Rattlesnake Mountain in the distance

Highest point
- Elevation: 600 ft (180 m)
- Parent peak: 41° 41' 23"N, 72° 49' 58"W
- Coordinates: 41°41′23″N 72°49′58″W

Geography
- Location: Farmington and Plainville, Connecticut
- Parent range: Metacomet Ridge

Geology
- Rock age: 200 Ma
- Mountain type(s): Fault-block; igneous

Climbing
- Easiest route: Metacomet Trail

Pinnacle Rock, 600 feet (180 m), is a traprock mountain peak located 10 miles (16 km) southwest of Hartford, Connecticut, in the towns of Farmington and Plainville. It is part of the narrow, linear Metacomet Ridge that extends from Long Island Sound near New Haven, Connecticut, north through the Connecticut River Valley of Massachusetts to the Vermont border. Pinnacle Rock, popular as an outdoor recreation destination in the metropolitan Hartford area, is known for its clifftop scenic vistas, unique microclimate ecosystems, rare plant communities, and as a seasonal raptor migration path. Pinnacle Rock is traversed by the 51-mile (82 km) Metacomet Trail.

Pinnacle Rock should not be confused with The Pinnacle, a name used for two other peaks also on the Metacomet Ridge in Connecticut (on Talcott Mountain and Higby Mountain).

== Geography ==
Pinnacle Rock occupies the high point of a 1-mile (1.6 km) long mountain ridge which rises steeply 400 feet (120 m) above the upper Quinnipiac River valley to the southwest and the Farmington River valley to the northwest. The summit is bald and offers extensive views west over the valleys and suburban Farmington, toward the Berkshire Mountains. The Metacomet Ridge continues north from Pinnacle Rock as Rattlesnake Mountain and south as Bradley Mountain. The Quinnipiac River, no more than a brook this far north, passes through the gap between Pinnacle Rock and Bradley Mountain.

The northeast side of Pinnacle Rock drains into Trout Brook, then to the Park River, thence into the Connecticut River and Long Island Sound; the rest of the mountain supports the headwaters of the Quinnipiac River, which flows directly into Long Island Sound.

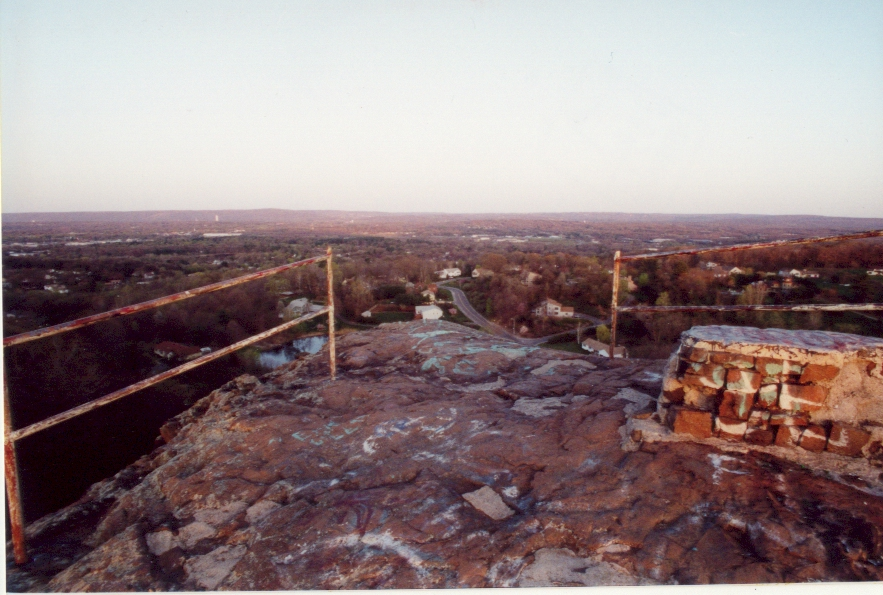
Summit of Pinnacle Rock; remains of Nike missile base lookout

=== Former missile site ===
HA-67 was a Nike 1B defensive missile base which operated from 1956 through March 1961 on the Plainville side of the rock near Loon Lake, southeast of the summit. The base is no longer in existence, with little remaining other than a parking lot and a few buildings which have been reduced to rubble. Further southeast is a small (0.4 mi/600 m wide) traprock quarry.

== Geology and ecology ==
Pinnacle Rock, like much of the Metacomet Ridge, is composed of basalt, also called traprock, a volcanic rock. The mountain formed near the end of the Triassic Period with the rifting apart of the North American continent from Africa and Eurasia. Lava welled up from the rift and solidified into sheets of strata hundreds of feet thick. Subsequent faulting and earthquake activity tilted the strata, creating the cliffs and ridgeline of Pinnacle Rock. Hot, dry upper slopes, cool, moist ravines, and mineral-rich ledges of basalt talus produce a combination of microclimate ecosystems on the mountain that support plant and animal species uncommon in greater Connecticut. Pinnacle Rock is also an important raptor migration path. (See Metacomet Ridge for more information on the geology and ecosystem of Pinnacle Rock).

== Recreation and conservation ==
Pinnacle Rock is traversed by the Metacomet Trail, (maintained by the Connecticut Forest and Park Association), which extends from the Hanging Hills of Meriden, Connecticut, to the Massachusetts border. The Metacomet Trail on the mountain is open to hiking, bird watching, picnicking, snowshoeing, and other active pursuits.

The ecosystem of Pinnacle Rock is most threatened by development and quarrying. In 2000, Pinnacle Rock was included in a study by the National Park Service for the designation of a new National Scenic Trail now tentatively called the New England National Scenic Trail, which would include the Metacomet-Monadnock Trail in Massachusetts and the Mattabesett Trail and Metacomet Trail trails in Connecticut.

== See also ==
- Metacomet Ridge
- Adjacent summits:

↓ South
Bradley Mountain
(no image)
North ↑

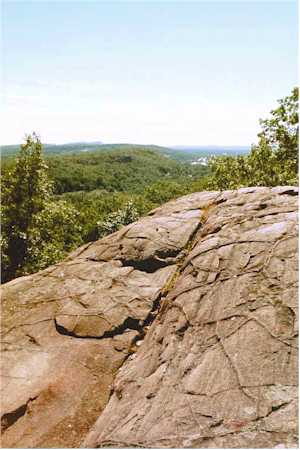
Rattlesnake Mountain
