= Lansing, New York =

Lansing
- Town
- Location within the state of New York
- Coordinates: 42°33′57″N 076°31′55″W
- Country: United States
- State: New York
- County: Tompkins
- Incorporated: 1817

Area
  - Total: 69.94 sq mi (181.15 km^{2})
  - Land: 60.49 sq mi (156.67 km^{2})
  - Water: 9.45 sq mi (24.48 km^{2}) 13.17%
- Elevation: 1,690 ft (515 m)

Population (2020)
  - Total: 11,565
  - Estimate (2022): 11,774
- Time zone: UTC-5 (Eastern (EST))
  - Summer (DST): UTC-4 (EDT)
- ZIP code: 14882, 14850
- Area codes: 315, 607
- FIPS code: 36-41234
- GNIS feature ID: 955042
- Website: https://lansingtownny.gov

Lansing is a town in Tompkins County, New York, United States. The population was 11,565 at the 2020 census.

The Town of Lansing has within it a village named Lansing. The town is located on the northern border of Tompkins County and is located just north of the City of Ithaca.

== History ==
The Town of Lansing is located on the Eastern shore of Cayuga Lake in the Finger Lakes region of Upstate New York.

The area was formerly within the territory of the Cayuga tribe and, in 1780, became part of the Central New York Military Tract to compensate New York's soldiers after they participated in the Revolutionary War.

The first settlers came in 1781, and John Lemming Jr., secretary to general Philip Schuyler, was charged with granting the land. The Town of Lansing was formed in 1817 from the Town of Genoa, Cayuga County, when Tompkins County was founded.

The town is named after John Lansing. People from the Town of Lansing were early settlers of Lansing, Michigan, and named it after their hometown; it later became the capital of Michigan.

The Watchtower Bible School of Gilead for Jehovah's Witnesses was in South Lansing from 1943 until 1960.

The Rogues' Harbor Inn was listed on the National Register of Historic Places in 2009.

In December 2014, the Lansing Town Board unanimously adopted a resolution recognizing freedom from domestic violence as a fundamental human right.

== Geography ==
According to the United States Census Bureau, the town has a total area of 69.9 square miles (181.1 km^{2}), of which 60.5 square miles (156.7 km^{2}) of it is land and 9.5 square miles (24.5 km^{2}) of it (13.17%) is water.

The north town line is the border of Cayuga County, and the west town line is delineated by Cayuga Lake, one of the Finger Lakes. Salmon Creek flows into the lake near Myers.

== Demographics ==
Historical population
Census	Pop.	Note	%±
1820	3,631		—
1830	4,020		10.7%
1840	3,672		−8.7%
1850	3,318		−9.6%
1860	3,222		−2.9%
1870	2,874		−10.8%
1880	3,000		4.4%
1890	2,505		−16.5%
1900	2,550		1.8%
1910	2,676		4.9%
1920	2,380		−11.1%
1930	2,720		14.3%
1940	2,786		2.4%
1950	3,195		14.7%
1960	4,221		32.1%
1970	5,972		41.5%
1980	8,317		39.3%
1990	9,296		11.8%
2000	10,521		13.2%
2010	11,033		4.9%
2020	11,565		4.8%
2022 (est.)	11,774	▲	1.8%
U.S. Decennial Census

As of the census of 2000, there were 10,521 people, 4,374 households, and 2,668 families residing in the town. The population density was 173.3 inhabitants per square mile (66.9/km^{2}). There were 4,634 housing units at an average density of 76.3 per square mile (29.5/km^{2}). The racial makeup of the town was 84.09% White, 4.09% Black or African American, 0.19% Native American, 8.86% Asian, 0.04% Pacific Islander, 0.73% from other races, and 2.01% from two or more races. Hispanic or Latino of any race were 2.35% of the population.

There were 4,374 households, out of which 30.0% had children under the age of 18 living with them, 50.3% were married couples living together, 7.6% had a female householder with no husband present, and 39.0% were non-families. 30.6% of all households were made up of individuals, and 6.8% had someone living alone who was 65 years of age or older. The average household size was 2.33, and the average family size was 2.95.

In the town, the population was spread out, with 26.1% under the age of 18, 7.7% from 18 to 24, 32.7% from 25 to 44, 23.5% from 45 to 64, and 10.1% who were 65 years of age or older. The median age was 35 years. For every 100 females, there were 99.8 males. For every 100 females age 18 and over, there were 94.6 males.

The median income for a household in the town was $48,250, and the median income for a family was $59,758. Males had a median income of $38,146 versus $31,250 for females. The per capita income for the town was $25,634. About 4.2% of families and 6.7% of the population were below the poverty line, including 5.1% of those under age 18 and 3.1% of those age 65 or over.

== Education ==
Lansing Central School District encompasses the town and its surrounding area. It has approximately 1,200 students in one elementary school (R.C. Buckley Elementary School), one middle school (Lansing Middle School), and one high school (Lansing High School). Tompkins-Seneca-Tioga Board of Cooperative Educational Services (TST BOCES) supports education in the region.

== Communities and locations in the Town of Lansing ==
- Asbury – A hamlet north of the Village of Lansing.
- Buck Corners – A location south of Lansingville.
- Dublin Corners – A location north of South Lansing.
- East Lansing – A location near the east town line.
- Head Corners – A hamlet east of Asbury.
- Howland Corners – A hamlet on the east town line.
- Howser Corners – A location south of North Lansing.
- Ithaca-Tompkins Regional Airport (ITH) – The airport serving the Ithaca area lies partially in the eastern part of the Village of Lansing and the south part of the town.
- Lake Ridge – A hamlet on NY-34B in the northwest part of the town.
- Lake Ridge Point – A projection into Cayuga Lake in the northwest part of the town.
- Lansing – The Village of Lansing is near the south town line on NY-13.
- Lansing Residential Center – A medium security correctional facility for girls operated by the State of New York.
- Lansing Station – A location near the shore of Cayuga Lake.
- Lansingville – A hamlet in the northwest part of the town.
- Ludlowville – A hamlet northwest of South Lansing.
- McKinneys – A hamlet near the shore of Cayuga Lake and on NY-34 in the southwest corner of the town.
- Midway – A hamlet on NY-34 north of Terpening Corners.
- Munson Corners – A location near the east town line.
- Myers – A hamlet west of South Lansing.
- Norten – A hamlet on the shore of Cayuga Lake north of Portland.
- North Lansing – A hamlet on NY-34 in the northeast corner of the town.
- Portland – A hamlet on the shore of Cayuga Lake by Portland Point.
- Portland Point – A projection into Cayuga Lake in the southwest part of the town.
- Rogues Harbor – A former section of the town known for thievery and misbehavior.
- Smith Corners – A location on the east town line.
- South Lansing – A hamlet and census-designated place at the junction of NY-34 and NY-34B in the western part of the town.
- Terpening Corners – A hamlet east of South Lansing by NY-34.

== Notable people ==
- Robert C. Baker – professor at Cornell University, inventor of the chicken nugget, and creator of the Cornell chicken recipe
- Kyle Dake – four-time World Champion freestyle wrestler and bronze medalist at the 2020 and 2024 Summer Olympics
- Tim DeKay – actor and star of the USA Network comedy-drama White Collar
- Jessica Ettinger – award-winning broadcast journalist with CNBC
- Joseph B. Hamilton – lawyer and judge who served in the Wisconsin State Senate
- Daniel D. Minier – major general in the NY Militia who constructed the Central Exchange Hotel
- Joey Sindelar – professional golfer who played on the PGA Tour
