= Wendell Phillips Norton Sr. =

American inventor

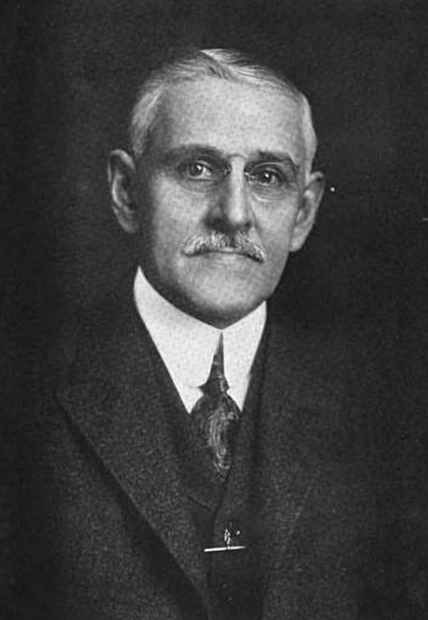

Wendell Phillips Norton Sr. (May 14, 1861 – August 8, 1955) was the inventor of a mechanical gear shift on the Hendy-Norton lathe.

== Biography ==
He was born on May 14, 1861, in Plainville, Connecticut, to John Calvin Norton and Harriet Hotchkiss. He died on August 8, 1955, at his home in Torrington, Connecticut.
