= Gems Sensors & Controls =

Global manufacturer of application engineered sensors

Gems Sensors & Controls Inc.
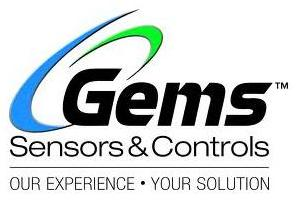
- Company type: Subsidiary of Fortive
- Industry: Manufacturing
- Founded: 1955; 71 years ago
- Founders: Edward Moore; Gordon Seigle
- Headquarters: Plainville, Connecticut, United States
- Area served: Worldwide
- Products: Fluidic Systems, Flow Switches, Level Sensors, Pressure Sensors, Pressure Switches, Pressure Transducers, Solenoid Valves
- Number of employees: 200-500
- Parent: Fortive
- Website: www.gemssensors.com

Gems Sensors and Controls is an American manufacturer of application engineered sensors. Founded in 1955, it makes level, pressure and flow sensors for use in a wide range of fluids across industry.

Gems Sensors is a division of Fortive Corporation, a company with a presence around the world. The company provides manufacturing services in North America, Europe, and Asia. It also has sales, engineering, and service offices in different parts of the world.

== History ==
Founded by Edward Moore & Gordon Seigle along with an associate, Gems Sensors & Controls (Gems) has been operational since 1955 and is based in Plainville, Connecticut, USA. Gems Sensors received its first commercial acclaim for a bilge switch developed for the small boating industry.

In 2016, the company was combined with two Fortive businesses to create Gems Setra.

== Products ==
Gems Sensors designs and manufactures liquid level, flow switches and pressure switches, miniature solenoid valves, and pre-assembled fluidic systems. The company is also into manufacturing customized level sensors, pressure sensors, proximity switches, solenoid valves, fluidic systems, flow sensors, and Warrick controls. It offers its products to different markets like alternative energy, semiconductor manufacturing, process tank gauging, waste water procession and other marine and industrial applications.
