= Congregational Church of Plainville =

- U.S. National Register of Historic Places
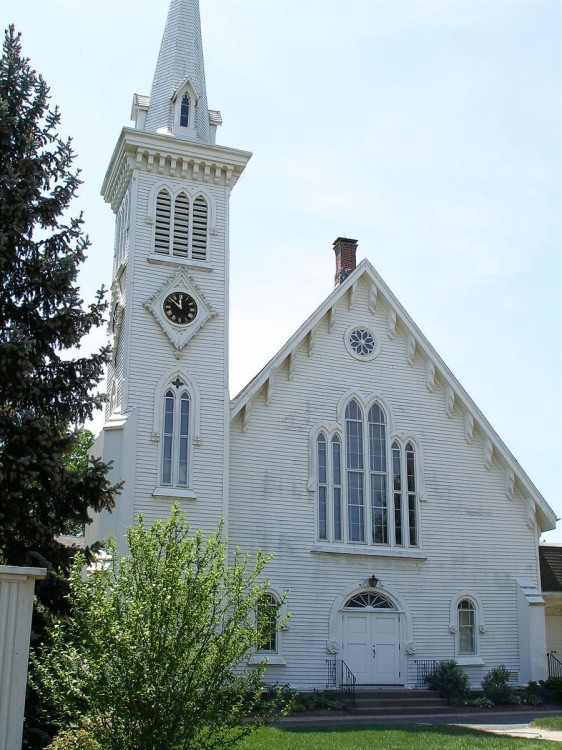

- Location within Connecticut Location within the United States
- Location: 130 West Main Street, Plainville, Connecticut
- Coordinates: 41°40′12″N 72°52′27″W
- Area: 1.1 acres (0.45 ha)
- Built: 1850
- Architect: Austin, Henry
- Architectural style: Gothic Revival
- NRHP reference No.: 12000358
- Added to NRHP: June 27, 2012

The Congregational Church of Plainville is a historic church building at 130 West Main Street in Plainville, Connecticut. Built in 1850, it is one Connecticut architect Henry Austin's significant church designs, exhibiting a mix of Carpenter Gothic and Romanesque features. It was built for a congregation formally organized in 1839 that is now affiliated with the United Church of Christ. The church was listed on the National Register of Historic Places in 2012.

== Architecture and history ==
The Congregational Church of Plainville stands on the south side of West Main Street (Connecticut Route 372) at its junction with Church Street.The main church building is a single-story timber frame structure, covered with a steeply pitched gable roof. The exterior is finished in wooden clapboards, with wooden pseudo-buttresses at the corners and brackets in the roof eaves. The main facade has a 20th-century Colonial Revival entrance at its center, with flanking round-arch windows on either side, and a large six-part gable-arched window above. Each of these features is crowned by a hooded moulding. To the left of the main facade is a square tower, also finished in wooden clapboards, and with similarly decorated windows. Clocks are set on two of the tower faces in diamond-shaped surrounds. Above these is the belfry, with Gothic gabled louvers above. A cornice above the belfry is decorated with densely placed brackets, and the octagonal spire above has slender dormered windows on four faces.

Plainville was a part of neighboring Farmington until 1869. Congregationalist residents of the area worshipped at Farmington's church from the period of the area's settlement in the 17th century until 1839, when a separate parish was formally established. Its first sanctuary was built at West Main and Canal Streets, and the present, larger edifice was built in 1850. It was designed by New Haven architect Henry Austin, a leading architect of the period in Connecticut. The building's use of both round-arch Romanesque windows and lance-arched Gothic windows illustrates a tension in church design at the time, in which some Congregationalist churches sought to differentiate themselves from the typically Gothic Roman Catholic buildings.

== See also ==
- National Register of Historic Places listings in Hartford County, Connecticut
