= Bradley Mountain =

Mountain in the American state of Connecticut

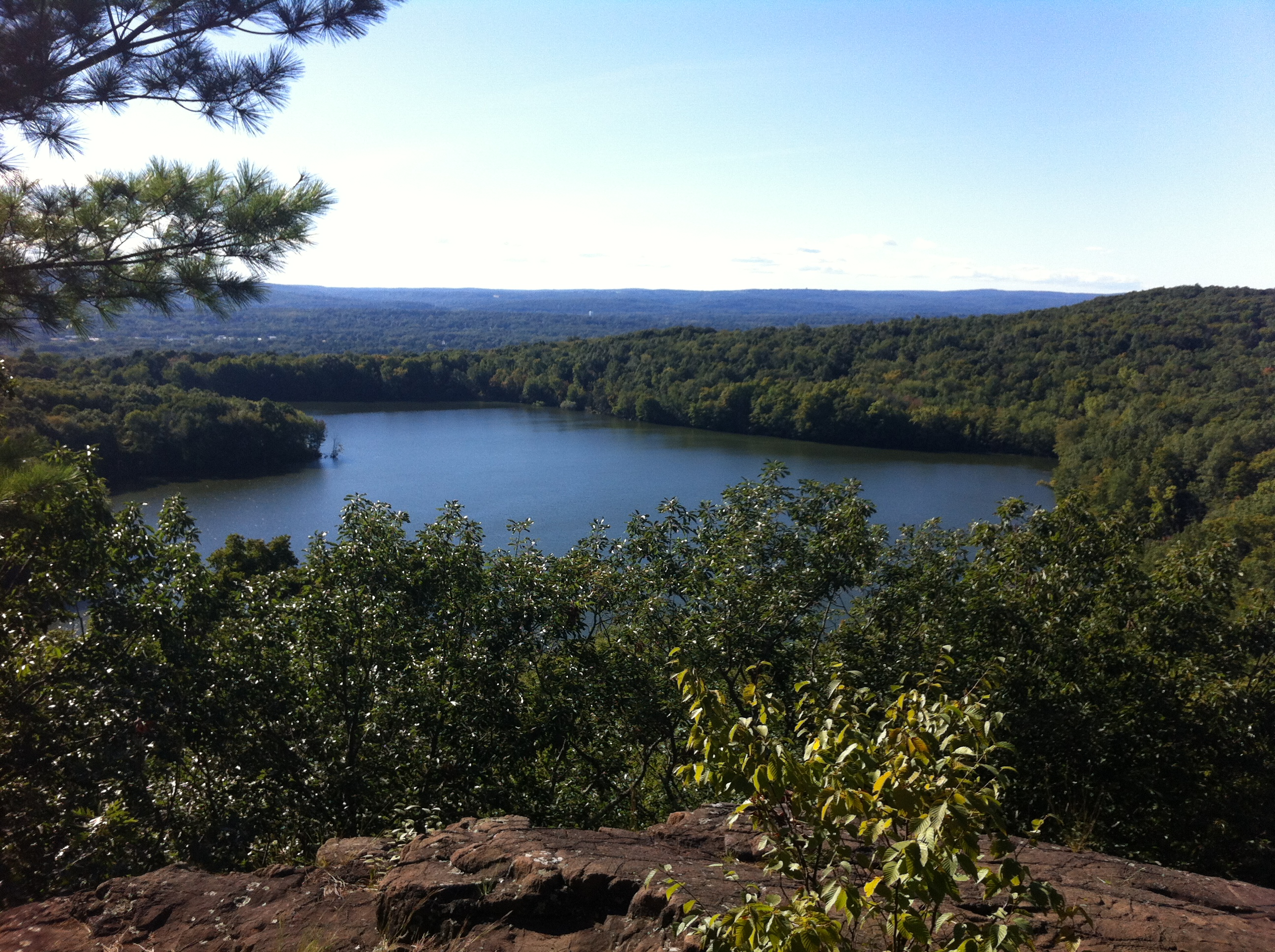
- View of Plainville Reservoir (AKA Crescent Lake) and Sunset Rock State Park from the Bradley Mountain summit.

Highest point
- Elevation: 679 ft (207 m)
- Coordinates: 41°39′27″N 72°50′15″W

Geography
- Location within Connecticut
- Location: Southington and Plainville, Connecticut
- Parent range: Metacomet Ridge

Geology
- Rock age: 200 Ma
- Mountain type(s): Fault-block; igneous

Climbing
- Easiest route: Metacomet Trail

Bradley Mountain, 700 feet (210 m), is a traprock mountain located 3 miles (5 km) west of New Britain, Connecticut, United States, in the towns of Southington and Plainville. It is part of the narrow, linear Metacomet Ridge that extends from Long Island Sound near New Haven, Connecticut, north through the Connecticut River Valley of Massachusetts to the Vermont border. Bradley Mountain, popular as an outdoor recreation destination in the metropolitan Hartford/ New Britain area, is known for its clifftop scenic vistas overlooking Plainville Reservoir, unique microclimate ecosystems, and rare plant communities. Bradley Mountain is traversed by the 62.7-mile (101 km) Metacomet Trail.

== Geography ==
Roughly 1.5 miles (2.4 km) in diameter, Bradley Mountain rises steeply 450 feet (140 m) above the Quinnipiac River valley to the west. The mountain consists of an upper ridgeline with several summits and a lower 375 feet (114 m) high bluff-line. The Metacomet Ridge continues north from Bradley Mountain as the ridgeline of Pinnacle Rock and south as Ragged Mountain. Plainville Reservoir (also called Crescent Lake) occupies a bowl-shaped valley on the western side of the mountain, and Shuttle Meadow Reservoir stands between Bradley Mountain and Ragged Mountain to the south. The lower bluff-line is occupied by suburban development. A 0.5 miles (0.8 km) diameter traprock quarry, owned by Tilcon, has obliterated the northeast side of Bradley Mountain below the summit.

The Quinnipiac River, not much more than a brook this far north, passes west through the gap between Bradley Mountain and Pinnacle Rock, forming the north and west and drainage of the mountain, before flowing into Long Island Sound. The east and south sides of the mountain drain into the Mattabesett River, then to the Connecticut River, thence to Long Island Sound.

== Geology and ecology ==
Bradley Mountain, like much of the Metacomet Ridge, is composed of basalt, also called traprock, a volcanic rock. The mountain formed near the end of the Triassic Period with the rifting apart of the North American continent from Africa and Eurasia. Lava welled up from the rift and solidified into sheets of strata hundreds of feet thick. Subsequent faulting and earthquake activity tilted the strata, creating the cliffs and ridgeline of Bradley Mountain. Hot, dry upper slopes, cool, moist ravines, and mineral-rich ledges of basalt talus produce a combination of microclimate ecosystems on the mountain that support plant and animal species uncommon in greater Connecticut. Bradley Mountain is an important raptor migration path. (See Metacomet Ridge for more information on the geology and ecosystem of Bradley Mountain).

== Recreation and conservation ==
Despite the development on its lower slopes and the quarry on the mountain's northeast side, Bradley Mountain is a large area of protected public land. Much of the summit and the upper ridgeline west of the summit extending down to Plainville Reservoir has been conserved as Sunset Rock State Park, an undeveloped state property, and as water conservation property managed by the town of Southington. Permitted activities include, boating, fishing, mountain biking, hiking, picnicking, snowshoeing, and bow hunting (in season). A number of rock climbing websites indicate several climbing routes on the mountain. Permits are required for non-resident boating and fishing. Bradley Mountain is also traversed by the 51-mile (82 km) Metacomet Trail, (maintained by the Connecticut Forest and Park Association), which extends from the Hanging Hills of Meriden, Connecticut, to the Massachusetts border. The Metacomet Trail also passes by Shuttle Meadow Reservoir, managed by the New Britain water department. Bradley Mountain offers a number of clifftop views west over Plainville Reservoir and south toward Ragged Mountain.

The ecosystem of Bradley Mountain is most threatened by quarrying. In 2000, Bradley Mountain was included in a study by the National Park Service for the designation of a new National Scenic Trail now called the New England National Scenic Trail, which includes the Metacomet-Monadnock Trail in Massachusetts as well as the Mattabesett Trail, Metacomet Trail and Menunkatuck Trail trails in Connecticut.

The Berlin Land Trust is active in the conservation of Bradley Mountain and its viewshed.

== See also ==
- Metacomet Ridge
- Adjacent summits:

↓ South

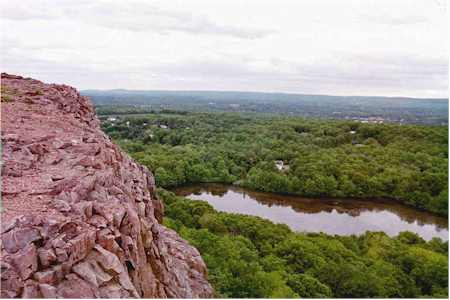
Ragged Mountain

North ↑

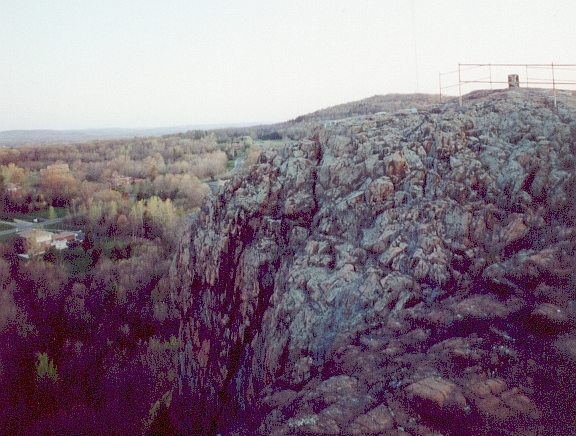
Pinnacle Rock
