= South Lansing, New York =

- Census-designated place
- Location within New York Location within the United States
- Coordinates: 42°32′16″N 76°30′21″W
- Country: United States
- State: New York
- County: Tompkins
- Town: Lansing

Area
  - Total: 2.76 sq mi (7.16 km^{2})
  - Land: 2.76 sq mi (7.15 km^{2})
  - Water: 0.0039 sq mi (0.01 km^{2})
- Elevation: 842 ft (257 m)

Population (2020)
  - Total: 1,078
  - Density: 390.5/sq mi (150.77/km^{2})
- Time zone: UTC-5 ({{{timezone}}}Eastern (EST))
  - Summer (DST): UTC-4 ({{{timezone_DST}}}EDTEDT)
- ZIP Code: 14882 (Lansing)
- Area code: 607
- FIPS code: 36-69342
- GNIS feature ID: 2806984

South Lansing is a census-designated place (CDP) in the town of Lansing, Tompkins County, New York, United States. As of the 2020 census, South Lansing had a population of 1,078. The CDP includes the hamlets of South Lansing, Terpening Corners, and Asbury. The area was first listed as a CDP before the 2020 census.

The community is in northern Tompkins County, southeast of the geographic center of the town of Lansing. It is the location of the Lansing Town Hall. New York State Route 34 passes through the community, leading north 30 miles (48 km) to Auburn and south through the village of Lansing 7 miles (11 km) to Ithaca. State Route 34B joins Route 34 in South Lansing but heads east 7 miles (11 km) to Route 38 between Groton and Freeville; while to the west it soon turns and runs parallel to Route 34, rejoining it in Fleming.

== Demographics ==
Historical population
Census	Pop.	Note	%±
2020	1,078		—
U.S. Decennial Census

== Education ==
The CDP is in the Lansing Central School District. It has approximately 1,200 students in one elementary school (R.C. Buckley Elementary School), one middle school (Lansing Middle School), and one high school (Lansing High School). Tompkins-Seneca-Tioga Board of Cooperative Educational Services (TST BOCES) supports education in the region.
