= Izze (drink) =

American sparkling juice brand

- Product type: Sparkling juice
- Current owner: PepsiCo
- Country: United States
- Introduced: February 2002
- Website: www.izze.com

Izze, stylized in all caps, is an American sparkling juice brand produced by the Izze Beverage Company, which is owned by PepsiCo. The company is based in Boulder, Colorado. It was founded in Boulder in 2002 by Greg Stroh and Todd Woloson, and was purchased by PepsiCo in 2006.

== Varieties ==
As of 2024, Izze is available in can and bottle forms. In can form, the flavors are: Apple, Blackberry, Cherry Lime, Clementine, Grapefruit, Mango, Peach, Pomegranate, Strawberry, Watermelon and Pineapple. In bottle form, they are: Blackberry, Cherry Lime, Clementine, Grapefruit, Peach, and Pomegranate. The flavors are sometimes sold in variety packs. The brand was also previously available as Izze esque, which has fewer calories; Izze Fortified, which has more vitamins; and Izze Fusions, a mix between sparkling water, sparkling soda, and juice. Izze Beverage Company also markets the brand as an alcohol mixer.

== History ==
Izze was created by Greg Stroh and Todd Woloson in Boulder, Colorado, in February 2002. It was inspired by the "Sundance Natural Juice Sparklers" sparkling fruit juice produced by the Stroh Brewery, which was the Stroh family business. Izze was an alternative to the carbonated soft drinks and juices on the market at the time. It grew in popularity through its placement in large retailers like King Soopers, Target, Starbucks, and Whole Foods. Izze was first released in four flavors: Blackberry, Grapefruit, Lemon, and Pear. Local bars in Colorado initially showed support to the company by serving the drink mixed with alcohol. Woloson served as the president and CEO of the Izze Beverage Company until its purchase in 2006. In 2005, Izze began being released in 12-packs of 8.4-ounce cans, intended for distribution in schools, which became popular purchases at Target and Tesco stores.

PepsiCo began talks to purchase Izze starting around March 2005. The purchase, for $75 million, was announced on September 26, 2006. PepsiCo had been declining in sales, partially because consumers had started moving towards healthier "natural beverage" brands like Izze. PepsiCo chose Izze as it was one of the top "natural beverage" brands in the country. Izze, which had 29 employees at the time, stayed in Colorado, and a Pepsi executive moved to area to help grow the brand. The two companies agreed to maintain Izze's brand as a small company. The brand was put under PepsiCo's Naked Juice division.

In 2009, it was reported that Izze was putting much of their marketing efforts into product placement in movies and TV shows, such as Grey's Anatomy. In 2016, PepsiCo was sued in a class action lawsuit that alleged the original Izze brand was deceptively marketed, as it claimed to have "no preservatives" and had "two servings of fruit based on USDA’s 2010 Dietary Guidelines"; the plaintiffs alleged the drinks fit neither of these descriptions. In July 2017, PepsiCo launched Izze Fusions, and promoted the version to teenagers by sponsoring the "Camp Izze" music festival on April 8, which was the start of musician Shawn Mendes' worldwide tour that year. The company is partnered with Stroh and Woloson's Global Education Fund nonprofit.
