= Rogues' Harbor Inn =

- U.S. National Register of Historic Places
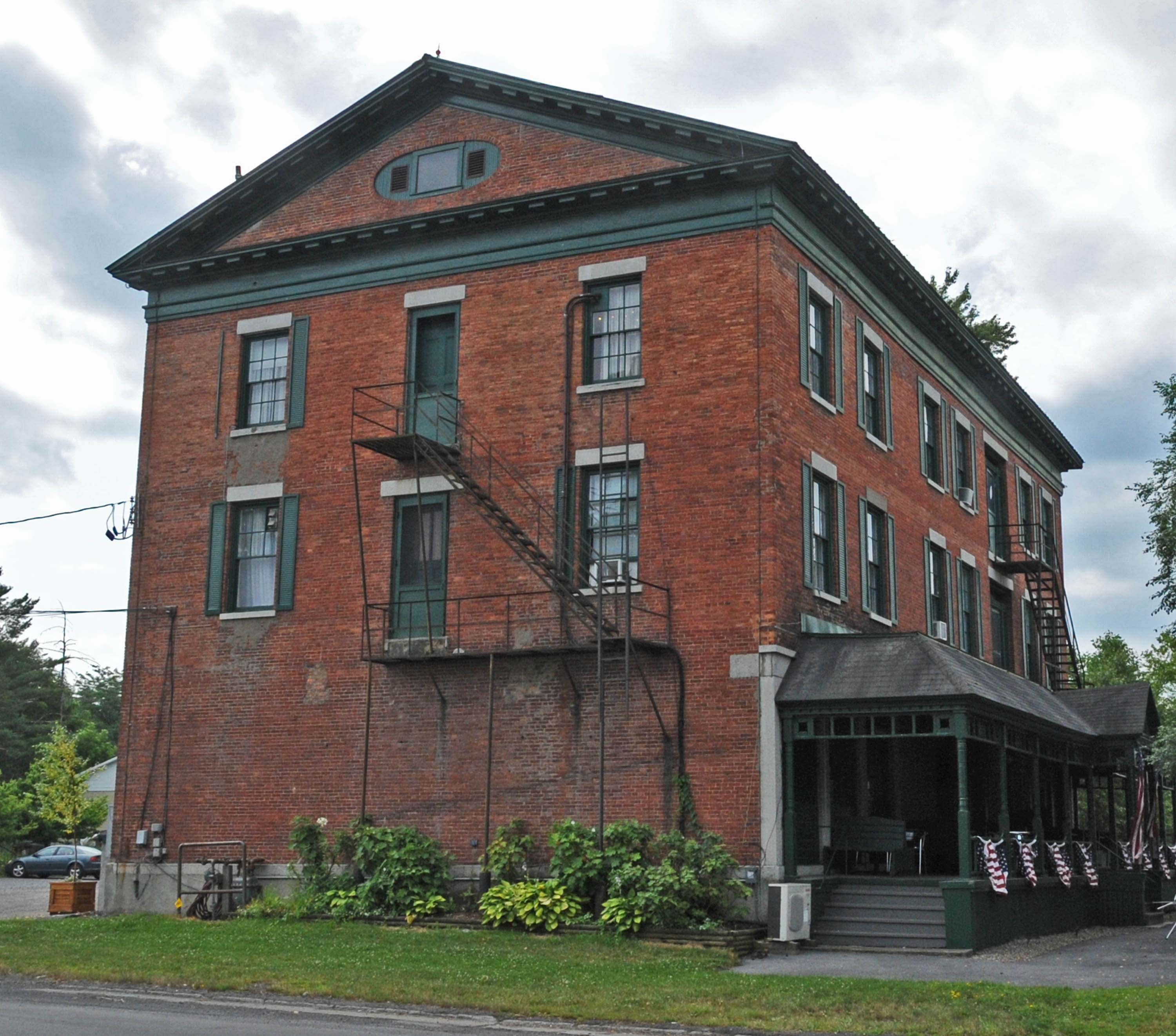

- Location within New York Location within the United States
- Location: 2079 East Shore Drive Lansing, New York
- Coordinates: 42°32′15.97″N 76°30′19.67″W
- Area: 0.6 acres (0.24 ha)
- Built: 1842
- Architect: Kelsey, Lemuel, Nelson Morgan
- Architectural style: Greek Revival
- NRHP reference No.: 09000657
- Added to NRHP: August 26, 2009

Rogues' Harbor Inn, formerly known as the Elm Grove Inn and Central Exchange Hotel, is a historic inn and tavern located in Lansing, New York. The building was listed on the National Register of Historic Places in 2009 and is located on the eastern shore of Cayuga Lake in the Finger Lakes region of Upstate New York, approximately eight miles from Ithaca.

The building is a three-story brick structure built in the Greek Revival style between 1830 and 1842 by major general Daniel Minier. It's a 40-foot-deep by 80-foot-wide rectangular on a stucco-coated fieldstone foundation with a gable roof. The building features a full-width porch with a roof supported by turned posts.

The author Grace Miller White used it as the inspiration for the setting for her novel Judy of Rogue's Harbor, which was made into a film of the same name in 1920.

== History ==
The Central Exchange Hotel was among the first brick structures built in Lansing (the first one was probably the Methodist church completed in 1811). Construction began in 1830 when major general Daniel Minier secured the services of Lemuel Kelsey of Dryden and apprentice carpenter Nelson Morgan of Lansing to erect this three-story building. The primary purpose of the building was to become a rooming house, a store, and living quarters.

At the cost of $40,000, Minier situated the building on family land purchased from Nicholas Van Rensselaer (Military Lot No. 87 of the Central New York Military Tract). The Central Exchange Hotel received its name because it was on the road between Ithaca and Auburn, and stagecoaches would stop there to exchange horses.

Seven years after completion, Minier died, and his remains were placed at Asbury Cemetery in Lansing.

== The Inn ==
The three-story building is largely colonial, with wooden pillars across the front and metal balconies on each story on the north and west sides. The first floor contains living rooms, a grill, and a bar with a vast hall extending the length of the structure through the center. The second floor has sleeping rooms, and the third has the famous ballroom. Connecting all the floors is a spiral stairway, a unique piece of 19th-century craftsmanship.

Above this is the attic, originally lit by two oval leaded-glass windows at either end. Located here were two huge zinc-lined cisterns expertly caulked and built of whitewood planks. One was for drinking water pumped by a windmill and piped throughout the building, and the other was for soft water from the roof used for the kitchen.
