= Niko Koutouvides =

American football player (born 1981)

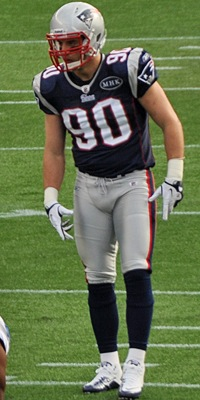
- Koutouvides with the New England Patriots in 2011

No. 53, 90
- Position: Linebacker

Personal information
- Born: March 25, 1981 (age 45); New Britain, Connecticut, U.S.
- Listed height: 6 ft 3 in (1.91 m)
- Listed weight: 245 lb (111 kg)

Career information
- High school: Plainville (CT)
- College: Purdue
- NFL draft: 2004: 4th round, 116th overall pick

Career history
- Seattle Seahawks (2004–2007); Denver Broncos (2008); Tampa Bay Buccaneers (2009–2010); New England Patriots (2011–2012)

Awards and highlights
- 2× First-team All-Big Ten (2002, 2003)

Career NFL statistics
- Total tackles: 168
- Sacks: 1.0
- Forced fumbles: 1
- Fumble recoveries: 1
- Stats at Pro Football Reference

Niko Stelios Koutouvides (born March 25, 1981) is an American former professional football player who was a linebacker in the National Football League (NFL). He was selected by the Seattle Seahawks in the fourth round of the 2004 NFL draft. He played college football for the Purdue Boilermakers.

He also played for the Denver Broncos, Tampa Bay Buccaneers and New England Patriots.

== Early life ==
Koutouvides was born in New Britain, Connecticut, to Stelios and Niki Koutouvides. His paternal grandfather's side of the family were Greeks who fled Asia Minor during the Greek-Turkish War, early in the 20th century, and settled in Tanzania, Africa. Subsequently, Niko's father moved to the United States. His mother's side of the family is from the Greek island of Kefalonia in the Ionian Sea. Growing up, Niko and his two brothers used to work as busboys or in the kitchen of the family-owned restaurant, The Stonewell, in Farmington, Connecticut.

Koutouvides attended Plainville High School, where he was a letterman in football. He topped the team in sacks and ranked second in tackles in 1999. He was named the team's Most Valuable Player, was an All-Conference selection, and an All-State Honorable Mention selection. Niko's older brother, Daki, was a senior defensive back at Merrimack College.

== College career ==
At Purdue, Koutouvides started in 32 of 50 games from 2000 to 2003. His career stats include 296 tackles (180 solo), 21½ tackles for a loss, five interceptions, four sacks, four fumble recoveries, and four forced fumbles. He majored in Organizational Leadership and Supervision.

As a junior, Koutouvides started all 13 games and notched a career-high of 121 tackles (80 of them solo) to lead the team to their 6th straight bowl game appearance. He had a team-high of 11.5 tackles for loss, including 4 sacks. He knocked down 3 passes and intercepted 3; posted at least 11 tackles in six games. Koutouvides saw action in every game during his first two seasons in a reserve role with 74 tackles, 4 fumble recoveries, and 3 forced fumbles.

His senior year began with him winning the Hammer Award as Purdue's best tackler. After anchoring a great Boilermaker defense that played in the 2004 Capital One Bowl, Koutouvides was named first-team All-Big Ten by the media and second-team by the coaches after starting every game as middle linebacker. Koutouvides finished second on the team with 101 tackles (57 of them solo), including 5.5 stops for losses, 2 pass interceptions and 4 passes knocked down, and causing & recovering 1 fumble.

== Professional career ==
=== Seattle Seahawks ===
Koutouvides was selected by the Seattle Seahawks in the fourth round of the 2004 NFL draft. He played four seasons for the team, from 2004 to 2007. He was a member of the 2005 team that played in Super Bowl XL.

=== Denver Broncos ===
On March 3, 2008, Koutouvides signed a three-year, $7.5 million contract with the Denver Broncos. After one season with the team, he was released on February 16, 2009.

=== Tampa Bay Buccaneers ===
The Tampa Bay Buccaneers signed Koutouvides on March 2, 2009. He became one of the Buccaneers' top special teams performers in his first season with the team in 2009

=== New England Patriots ===
Koutouvides signed with the New England Patriots on August 14, 2011. He was cut on September 3 but re-signed on November 9, 2011, and went on to appear as a member of the special teams at the 2012 Super Bowl. He was released by the Patriots on August 31, 2012, during final cuts. Koutouvides was re-signed by the Patriots on September 19, 2012. On August 26, 2013, he was cut by the Patriots.

== NFL career statistics ==
Legend
| **Bold** | Career high |

=== Regular season ===
| Year | Team | Games | | Tackles | | | | | Interceptions | | | | | Fumbles | | | |
| Year | Team | GP | GS | Cmb | Solo | Ast | Sck | TFL | Int | Yds | TD | Lng | PD | FF | FR | Yds | TD |
|---|---|---|---|---|---|---|---|---|---|---|---|---|---|---|---|---|---|
| 2004 | SEA | **16** | **2** | **62** | **49** | **13** | **1.0** | **4** | 0 | 0 | 0 | 0 | 0 | 0 | 0 | 0 | 0 |
| 2005 | SEA | 12 | 0 | 13 | 10 | 3 | 0.0 | 0 | 0 | 0 | 0 | 0 | 0 | 0 | 0 | 0 | 0 |
| 2006 | SEA | **16** | 0 | 15 | 12 | 3 | 0.0 | 0 | 0 | 0 | 0 | 0 | 0 | 0 | 0 | 0 | 0 |
| 2007 | SEA | 15 | 0 | 27 | 22 | 5 | 0.0 | 0 | 0 | 0 | 0 | 0 | **1** | **1** | 0 | 0 | 0 |
| 2008 | DEN | 14 | 0 | 10 | 9 | 1 | 0.0 | 0 | 0 | 0 | 0 | 0 | 0 | 0 | 0 | 0 | 0 |
| 2009 | TAM | **16** | 0 | 11 | 11 | 0 | 0.0 | 0 | 0 | 0 | 0 | 0 | 0 | 0 | 0 | 0 | 0 |
| 2010 | TAM | 14 | 0 | 12 | 11 | 1 | 0.0 | 0 | 0 | 0 | 0 | 0 | 0 | 0 | 0 | 0 | 0 |
| 2011 | NWE | 8 | 1 | 14 | 7 | 7 | 0.0 | 0 | 0 | 0 | 0 | 0 | 0 | 0 | **1** | 0 | 0 |
| 2012 | NWE | 14 | 0 | 4 | 3 | 1 | 0.0 | 0 | 0 | 0 | 0 | 0 | 0 | 0 | 0 | 0 | 0 |
| | | 125 | 3 | 168 | 134 | 34 | 1.0 | 4 | 0 | 0 | 0 | 0 | 1 | 1 | 1 | 0 | 0 |

=== Playoffs ===
| Year | Team | Games | | Tackles | | | | | Interceptions | | | | | Fumbles | | | |
| Year | Team | GP | GS | Cmb | Solo | Ast | Sck | TFL | Int | Yds | TD | Lng | PD | FF | FR | Yds | TD |
|---|---|---|---|---|---|---|---|---|---|---|---|---|---|---|---|---|---|
| 2004 | SEA | 1 | **1** | **8** | **7** | 1 | 0.0 | 0 | 0 | 0 | 0 | 0 | 0 | 0 | 0 | 0 | 0 |
| 2005 | SEA | **3** | 0 | 7 | 5 | **2** | 0.0 | 0 | 0 | 0 | 0 | 0 | 0 | 0 | 0 | 0 | 0 |
| 2006 | SEA | 2 | 0 | 1 | 1 | 0 | 0.0 | 0 | 0 | 0 | 0 | 0 | 0 | 0 | 0 | 0 | 0 |
| 2007 | SEA | 2 | 0 | 0 | 0 | 0 | 0.0 | 0 | 0 | 0 | 0 | 0 | 0 | 0 | 0 | 0 | 0 |
| 2011 | NWE | **3** | 0 | 1 | 0 | 1 | 0.0 | 0 | 0 | 0 | 0 | 0 | 0 | 0 | 0 | 0 | 0 |
| 2012 | NWE | 2 | 0 | 1 | 0 | 1 | 0.0 | 0 | 0 | 0 | 0 | 0 | 0 | 0 | 0 | 0 | 0 |
| | | 13 | 1 | 18 | 13 | 5 | 0.0 | 0 | 0 | 0 | 0 | 0 | 0 | 0 | 0 | 0 | 0 |
