= SoBe =

American drink brand

South Beach Beverage Company
- Type: Subsidiary
- Industry: Beverages
- Founded: 1996; 30 years ago in Norwalk, Connecticut, United States
- Founder: John Bello; Tom Schwalm
- Headquarters: Purchase, New York, United States
- Area served: United States
- Products: Enhanced water Fruit juice drinks Tea
- Parent: PepsiCo
- Website: SoBe.com

Sobe (stylized as SoBe) is an American brand of teas, fruit-juice blends and enhanced water beverages owned by PepsiCo. The name SoBe is an abbreviation of South Beach, named after the upscale area located in Miami Beach, Florida. In the past, the SoBe name has also been licensed for gum and chocolate products.

== Company history ==
SoBe began as the South Beach Beverage Company, a drink manufacturer based in Norwalk, Connecticut from 1996 to 2001. It was co-founded by John Bello and Tom Schwalm in 1995. Their first product was SoBe Black Tea 3G which contained ginseng, guarana, and ginkgo. It proved to be popular and led to the introduction of other flavors. The company was bought by PepsiCo in October 2000.

SoBe switched from glass bottles to plastic bottles for all of its beverages in 2007.

While not officially discontinued, SoBe no longer offers direct ordering or delivery of their products as of 2024, with SoBe acknowledging that availability is limited to "special orders".

== Products ==
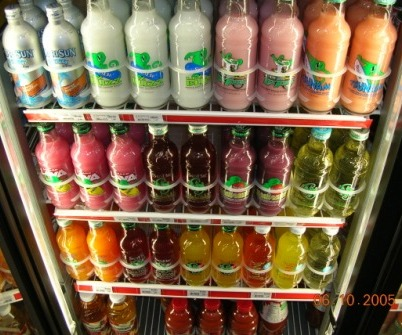
SoBe glass bottled drinks

- SoBe Lifewater / SoBe Water - A vitamin-infused beverage. Most of the flavors are non-caloric and use steviol glycosides for natural sweetening.
- SoBe Elixirs - A line of fully sweetened (with sucrose and in some cases a mix of sucrose and Stevia) beverages with herbal extracts and some vitamins.

=== Discontinued products ===
- SoBe Qi
- SoBe Adrenaline Rush
- SoBe No Fear
- SoBe Elixirs 3C
- SoBe Eros
- Power Line
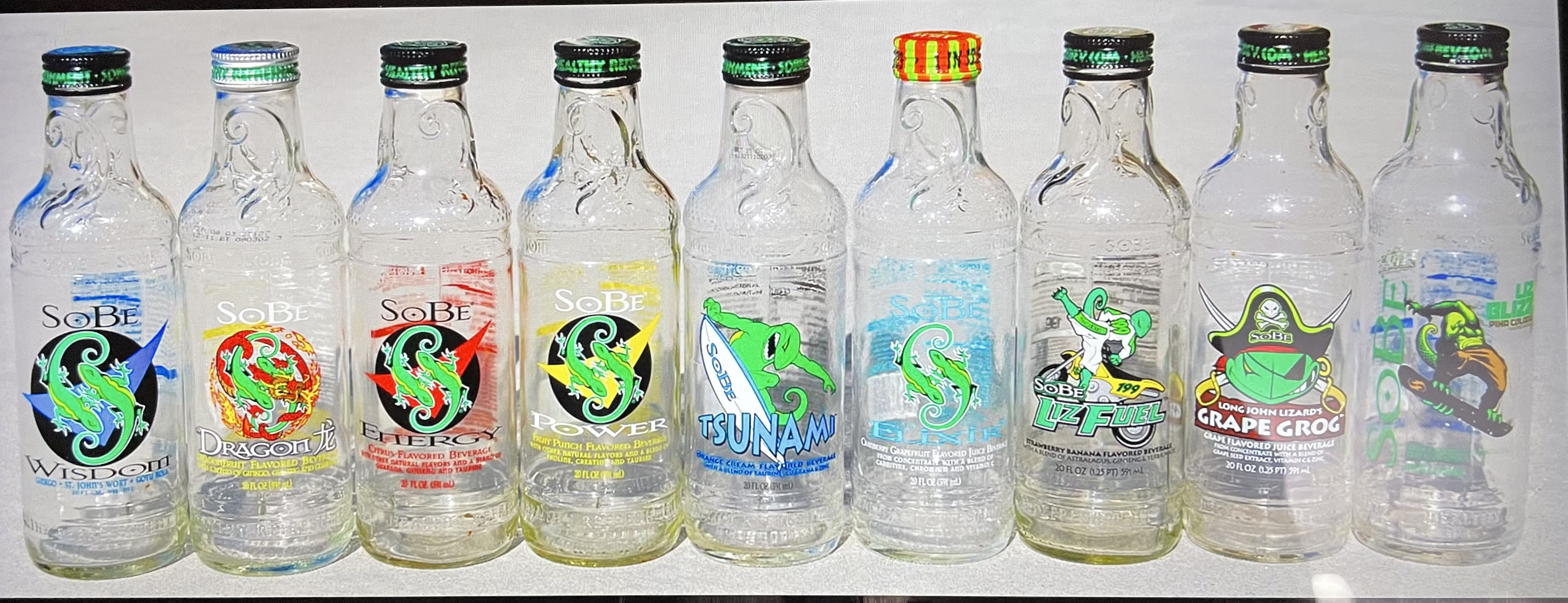
- SoBe Synergy
- SoBe Nirvana
- SoBe Special Recipes
- SoBe Essential Energy
- SoBe Ice
- SoBe Zen Blend
- Sobe Wisdom
- SoBe SuperMan
- SoBe Good
- SoBe Dragon
- SoBe Love Bus Brew
- SoBe Oolong tea
- SoBe Lizard Lava
- SoBe Lizard Fuel
- SoBe Lizard Lighting
- SoBe Black and Blue Berry Brew
- SoBe Long John Lizard's Grape Grog
- SoBe Tea – A line of iced tea beverages with herbal extracts.
- SoBe Pure Rush – A line of energy drinks, no longer available in the United States.

==== SoBe Mr. Green ====
Mr. Green (SoBe)
- A 20 oz bottle of SoBe Mr. Green
- Type: Soft drink
- Manufacturer: SoBe (division of PepsiCo)
- Origin: United States
- Introduced: 2002
- Discontinued: 2003
- Color: Green-tinted
- Flavor: Pepper-style carbonated energy soft drink
- Related products: Moxie; Dr Pepper; Mr. Pibb; Dr. Wells
- Website: www.sobe.com

Mr. Green was a short-lived carbonated soda offered by SoBe, widely released in the United States. Shipping in April 2002 and first available to consumers in May, it was produced in 12 oz cans, 20 oz bottles, 1-liter bottles, and 2-liter bottles.

The soda's mascot of the same name was described as a "cyber lizard" in SoBe's press release. This character was a modernized version of the lizard found on other SoBe products.

Mr. Green was tinted green, and included ginseng for flavor and added energy.

== Marketing campaigns ==
- Lizard Tales is a monthly digital newsletter published by SoBe for their fans. The newsletter provides consumers with product updates, promotions and cultural trends.
- In 2000, SoBe launched Adrenaline Rush which was marketed toward action sports.
- Heads or Tails was the name of the SoBe under-the-cap promotion where consumers could instantly win prizes, including SoBe apparel, Apple iPods, Apple MacBook Pros, or product coupons for future purchases.
- The 2001 game Oddworld: Munch's Oddysee features vending machines in the game that dispense SoBe drinks. This was only available in the North American version of the game.
- The 2004 game Driv3r also features vending machines (which don't work), along with bus ads and a SoBe themed truck in game.
- Tony Hawk's Underground 2 has extensive SoBe advertising. Mike Vallely is even wearing a SoBe shirt.
- In the 2006 film Employee of the Month, Vince Downey (played by Dax Shepard) drinks Sobe Nirvana with a Gatorade twist cap.
- Starting in 2007, SoBe sponsored the Chicago Rush cheerleaders of the Arena Football League. The Rush dance team was called the SoBe Adrenalin Rush Dancers.
- In 2008 & 2009, SoBe had Super Bowl ads in support of SoBe Lifewater.
- In 2010, SoBe Lifewater partnered with AOL FanHouse to bring college basketball fans a bracket challenge where they could play their bracket against the brackets of celebrities, including Kendra Wilkinson, Brooklyn Decker, Jerry Rice and Kenny "The Jet" Smith. Those fans whose bracket beat a celebrity bracket had a chance to meet them. If a fan had a perfect bracket, they could win up to $10,000,000.
- From 2010 to 2012, SoBe Lifewater partnered annually with actresses for their 'Skinsuits' campaign, Starting with Ashley Greene in 2010, Jessica Szohr in 2011, and ending the campaign in 2012 with Yvonne Strahovski
- In 2011, Ellie Goulding was announced as the UK face of SoBe. As part of the campaign she spent time in South Beach, Miami interviewing locals and traveling to South Beach hot-spots.
- In July 2011 SoBe partnered with Mike Tyson: Main Event in launching a mobile gaming campaign for the brand's teas, fruit juice blends, and enhanced waters.
