= Johnnycake Mountain (Connecticut) =

Geographical Location in Connecticut

Highest point
- Elevation: 1,161 ft (354 m)
- Coordinates: 41°45′12″N 72°59′40″W

Geography
- Country: United States
- State: Connecticut
- Region: New England
- Biome: Temperate deciduous forest

Johnnycake Mountain is the highest peak in Burlington, Connecticut at 1,161 ft (354 m) and the 7th highest peak in Hartford County at the foothills of the Berkshires. The summit reflects the historical usage as a significant portion of the area was cleared of trees for farming; however, it is now developed with single-family homes. From the summit, one can see the Farmington River Valley and Heublein Tower to the east. The blue-blazed and white dot Tunxis Trail traverses the mountain, leading to a network of other trails in nearby Sessions Woods Wildlife Management Area and Nassahegon State Forest.

== History ==
=== Early history and naming ===
Folklore suggests that early settlers called it Johnnycake Mountain after mostly surviving on johnnycakes during the long and harsh winters. Alternatively, when the area was clear-cut for farming by early settlers, the rounded shape of the mountain visually resembled a johnnycake.

In the 18th century, early inhabitants avoided creating settlements on the mountain and in the center of Burlington as it was deemed to formidable. Instead, early settlers built smaller communities in the outskirts of town, including Whigville, Connecticut and Collinsville, Connecticut.

=== The 19th century ===
In the 1820s, a schoolhouse was built on Johnnycake Mountain to help provide education for children in District No. 6, after land was donated by Joel Bunnell.

=== The 20th century ===
In the early 1900s, Paul S. Ney became the third owner of the lands, by deed, after the land originally being transferred from the Tunxis Connecticut Native Americans living in the area. He built a small shanty amongst the huckleberry pasture at the summit which was oftentimes occupied in the summer as a forest fire station. Within a few years, he later purchased an adjacent farm house with approximately 400 acres of farm land.

In 1988, Dwight Harris purchased approximately 1,000 acres of property on Johnnycake Mountain from John Gilbert Martin, including the summit.

=== The 21st century ===
Johnnycake Mountain Meadows Airfield (22B) was an airport on the northwestern side of Johnnycake Mountain. The airport had a 2,400 ft northwest to southwest runway with a flight school and fuel depot that closed on April 1, 2004, after the owner no longer wanted an airport on his property.

Dwight Harris floats the idea for a 150-room country inn atop Johnnycake Mountain in 2005 to the Town of Burlington's Planning and Zoning Commission. He mentions that he wants to help preserve public access versus further developing the area with single-family homes.

By 2008, Dwight Harris approaches the Town of Burlington to determine if there is interest in purchasing 63 acres of property, including the summit for $5 million. The Board of Selectman ultimately forgoes purchasing the land due to the 2008 financial crisis and other town priorities, such as; firehouse upgrades, updating town hall, and a community/senior center. The 63 acres surrounded by Mountain Top Pass and Johnnycake Mountain Road are sold off to developers as individual lots for single-family home construction.

In 2016, the Town of Burlington purchased Johnnycake Mountain Farm for $1,675,000 with hopes of turning it into a municipal park for active and passive recreation.

== Structures on the mountain ==
Prominent features on the summit are the Johnnycake Mountain Farm Quail Barn and a radio tower.

=== Quail Barn ===
The barn was originally used by John Gilbert Martin for raising and hunting pheasant, partridge, and quail hunting to be sold to restaurants and steamship lines.

=== Broadcast Tower ===
One radio station transmits from a broadcast tower below the summit on the south side: WJMJ (88.9 Hartford, Connecticut).

=== Fire Lookout Tower ===
While no longer standing, a 50-foot steel fire lookout tower was erected at the summit and opened in 1930 after land was donated by Harry Ney to the State of Connecticut. The tower gave views of Mohawk Mountain to the west, Talcott Mountain to the east, and the Hanging Hills to the south. At the time, this was the tallest steel tower ever built by the Connecticut State Park and Forest Commission

== Recreation and conservation ==
The Burlington Land Trust is active in the conservation of Johnnycake Mountain and its viewshed, including hiking and walking trails.

The mountain has been and continues to be used for a variety of festivals throughout the year that have included balloon rides, music bands, fireworks, hay rides, and Halloween parades. A youth fishing derby was previously held in a retention pond by the local Lions Club International organization.
