= Satan's Kingdom State Recreation Area =

Site in New Hartford, Connecticut, USA

Satan's Kingdom State Park
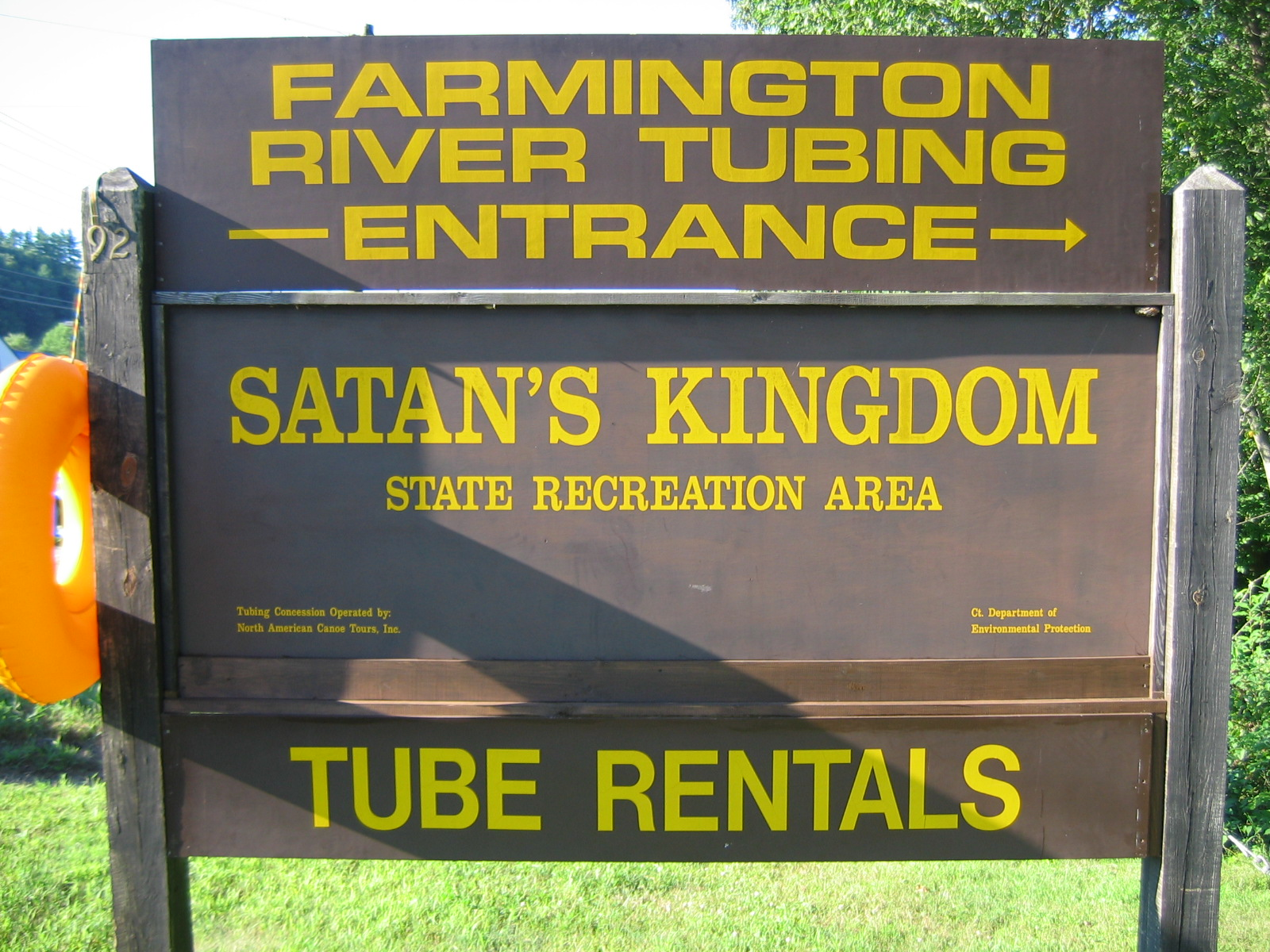

- Location within Connecticut Location within the United States
- Interactive map of Satan's Kingdom State Park
- Location: New Hartford, Connecticut, United States
- Coordinates: 41°51′20″N 72°57′26″W
- Area: 1 acre (0.40 ha)
- Established: 2012
- Administrator: Connecticut Department of Energy and Environmental Protection
- Website: Official website
- Connecticut state parks

Satan's Kingdom State Park is a public recreation area occupying one acre (0.40 ha) of land beside the Farmington River in the town of New Hartford, Connecticut. The site is located on the north side of the Route 44 bridge over the Farmington River. It is used as a put-in for canoeing, kayaking, and tubing excursions on the river.

== History ==
The gorge through which the Farmington River flows has been known as "Satan’s Kingdom" since the 1870s, when the construction of the New Haven and Northampton Railroad along the river proved particularly difficult. The recreation area was added to the roll of Connecticut state parks in 2012.

== Activities and amenities ==
Tube rentals are offered by a concessionaire. A 2.5-mile (4.0 km) trip encounters three sets of rapids. Hiking trails in neighboring Nepaug State Forest, including the Tunxis Trail, are accessible from Satan's Kingdom Road on the south side of the bridge.
