= Lewis S. Mills =

Former Connecticut educator and author

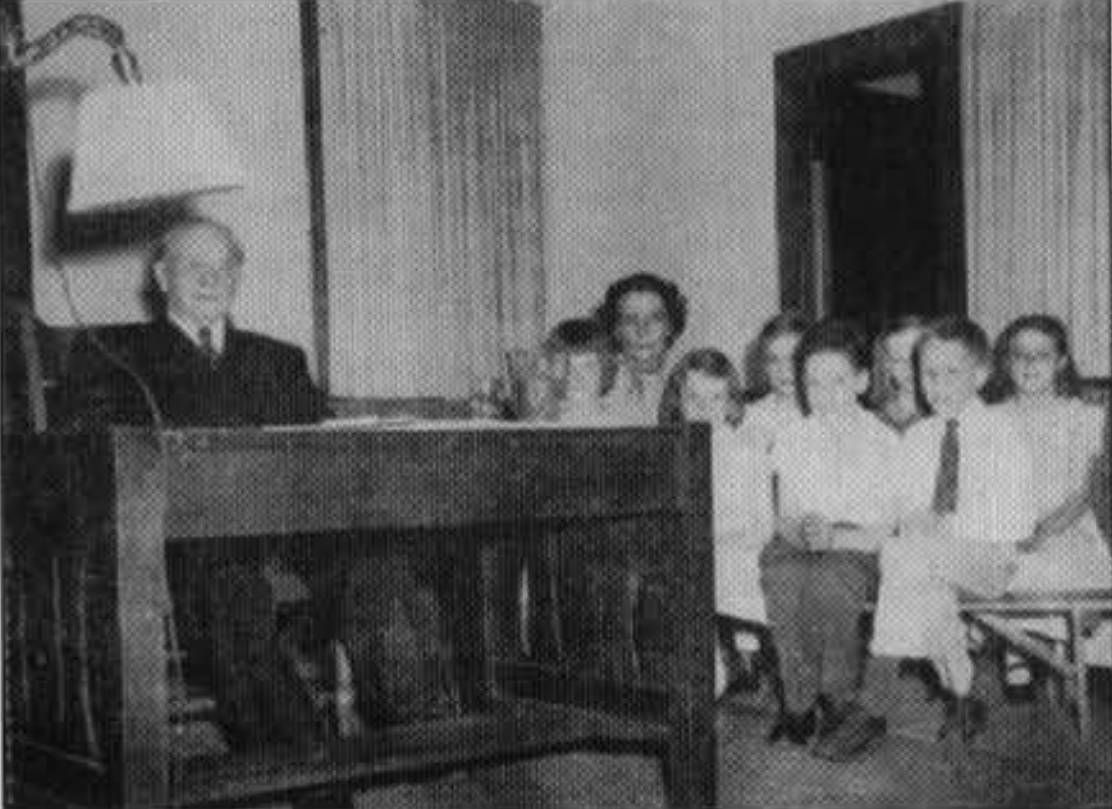
- Lewis S. Mills (left) reading to schoolchildren in Canton, Connecticut in 1952

Plainville Justice of the Peace
- In office 1914–1928

Rural Supervisor of Schools in Burlington
- In office 1916–1928

Rural Supervisor of Harwinton
- In office 1927–1939

Personal details
- Born: Lewis Sprague Mills; September 5, 1874 Canton, Connecticut
- Died: March 7, 1965 (aged 90)
- Children: Lewis Mills Jr. Charles W. Mills; Mary Louise Reno
- Parent(s): Deacon Archibald Mills; Mary Loomis Mills
- Education: Collinsville High School
- Awards: George Washington Bicentennial Medal

Lewis Sprague Mills Sr. (/ˈspreɪɡ/; 5 September 1874 – 7 March 1965) was an American educator, photographer, writer, and local politician noted for his contributions to Connecticut history and to education in Northwestern Connecticut. In November 1960 a regional high school was built in Burlington, Connecticut which was chosen to be named Lewis S. Mills High School after Mills' contributions to education in the area.

== Early life ==
Mills was born into a farming family in the town of Canton, Connecticut on 5 September 1874 to Deacon Archibald Mills and Mary Loomis Mills. The family grew apples, tobacco, and hay at their farm in Canton, which was built in 1821. Although little is known about Mills' parents, his father Deacon Archibald Mills served in the American Civil War with the 22nd Connecticut Volunteer Regiment and was described as having been "frugal" and "harsh". Lewis Mills was ultimately a descendant of Ephraim Mills, who is credited with giving the town of Canton its name.

In 1877 at the age of three Lewis Mills suffered an injury which caused him to wear a leg brace for the rest of his life. Due to his injury, Mills' father referred to him as "Little Lewis" in his diary.

At the age of five, Mills first entered school, although at seven Mills' father began to make him work on the farm harvesting tobacco. After the age of 14, Mills' father did not allow him to continue his education and hoped that he would continue to work on the family farm. At the age of 18 Mills' mother died, although on her deathbed she was able to convince her husband that Lewis should be able to continue his education into high school.

At 18, Mills enrolled in Collinsville High School with his father's newfound approval. In 1897 Mills published his first poem, and in 1901 he purchased his first camera for fifty dollars. In 1902 as Mills began taking photographs of Canton and the surrounding area, his father constructed a photography studio for him in their home.

== Career ==
In 1902, Mills published his first photo; he was asked by news reporters to sneak into a railroad car in Willimantic to take a photograph of quarantined smallpox victims inside, which he did. For his photograph, Mills was paid one-hundred dollars. With the money he earned, Mills bought a more expensive camera, and went around Connecticut on a horse and buggy taking photographs. Mills took a particular interest in photographing one-room school houses in Connecticut. Aside from school houses, the subjects of Mills' photographs included churches, rural scenes, and members of Native American tribes, such as the Mohegan.

Mills interest in photographing rural schools brought him very close to the educational shortfalls of Northwestern Connecticut at that time. Having at first been denied higher education by his father, Mills advocated for students to remain in school until 7th grade or 16 years of age before they be allowed to leave. From 1908 to 1939 Mills served as a Supervising Agent for the Connecticut State Board of Education. During the 1910s, Mills took up positions in local government to allow him to better assist local schools, which included becoming the Rural Supervisor of Schools in Burlington.

During his time as part of the Plainville, Burlington, and Harwinton local governments, Mills wrote books for students and teachers including The Government of the People in the State of Connecticut which was an educational work intended to be propagated in local schools.

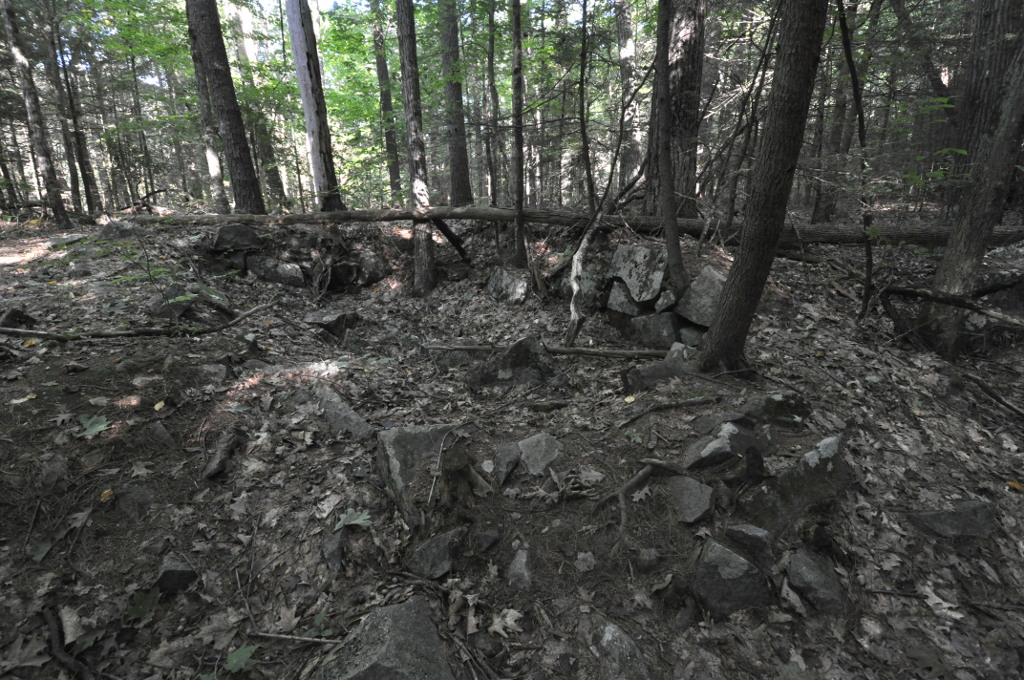
The remains of the cellar of a house that was part of the Barkhamstead Lighthouse. The site was extensively written about in Mills' 1952 book The Legend of Barkhamstead Light House.

During his time as part of local governments and even after his retirement in 1939, Mills continued to document rural historical sites and other locations in Connecticut through his photography and writing. One of Mills' most widely-remembered works was The Legend of Barkhamstead Light House which combined the historical situation and general stories and legends surrounding the Barkhamstead Lighthouse from the 18th century into a single work. Although considered to be one of the most complete historical accounts of the Barkhamstead Lighthouse, the work is written in a form similar to that of the Kalevala.

== Legacy ==
Lewis S. Mills died in 1965, five years after Lewis S. Mills High School was built at the age of 90. Many of Mills' photographs of rural Connecticut in the early-20th century are irreproducable, since many of the locations have either been destroyed or changed since when his photographs were originally taken. Mills' literary works on Connecticut history including The Story of Connecticut and The Legend of Barkhamstead Light House are considered to be well-written works in their areas of research, and in the case of The Legend of Barkhamstead Light House, it is still used as a main source of information in the history of the Barkhamstead Lighthouse.

== Bibliography ==
- The Government of the People in the State of Connecticut (1917)
- Selections for Reading by the Direct Method: A Manual for Teachers (1920)
- The Story of Connecticut (1932, reprinted 1958)
- The Legend of Barkhamstead Light House (1952)
