= Regional School District 10 =

School district in Connecticut, United States

Address
- 24 Lyon Road Burlington, Connecticut, 6013; United States

District information
- Type: Public
- Grades: PreK–12
- Superintendent: Fran Thompson
- NCES District ID: 0903520

Students and staff
- Students: 2,179
- Teachers: 179.1
- Staff: 238.0
- Student–teacher ratio: 12.17

Other information
- Website: Official website

Regional School District #10 serves the towns of Burlington and Harwinton Connecticut. It is located at 24 Lyon Road, Burlington, CT 06013.

== History ==
RegIonal School district #10 was established in 1962. The regional middle school's name, Har-Bur, is a syllable combination of the two towns that compose the school district. The high school is named in honor of Lewis S. Mills. He served as Rural Supervisor of Schools for Burlington from 1916 to 1928, and in the same position for Harwinton from 1927 to 1939.

== Schools ==
Regional School District 10 has four Schools

- Lake Garda Elementary School
- Harwinton Consolidated Elementary School
- Har-Bur Middle School
- Lewis S. Mills High School
