= Niehoff =

Niehoff is a surname. Notable people with this surname include:

- Bert Niehoff (1884–1974), Americal baseball player
- Domenica Niehoff (1945–2009), German prostitute and activist
- Hendrik Niehoff (1495–1561), Dutch pipe organ builder
- Hermann Niehoff (1897–1980), German general
- Niklas Niehoff (born 2004), German footballer
- Robert L. Niehoff (born 1953), American academic administrator
- Robert Niehoff (born 1964), American football player

== See also ==
- Doninger v. Niehoff, a 2008 United States Court of Appeals case
