= Preston Hazard =

American photographer, filmmaker, and musician

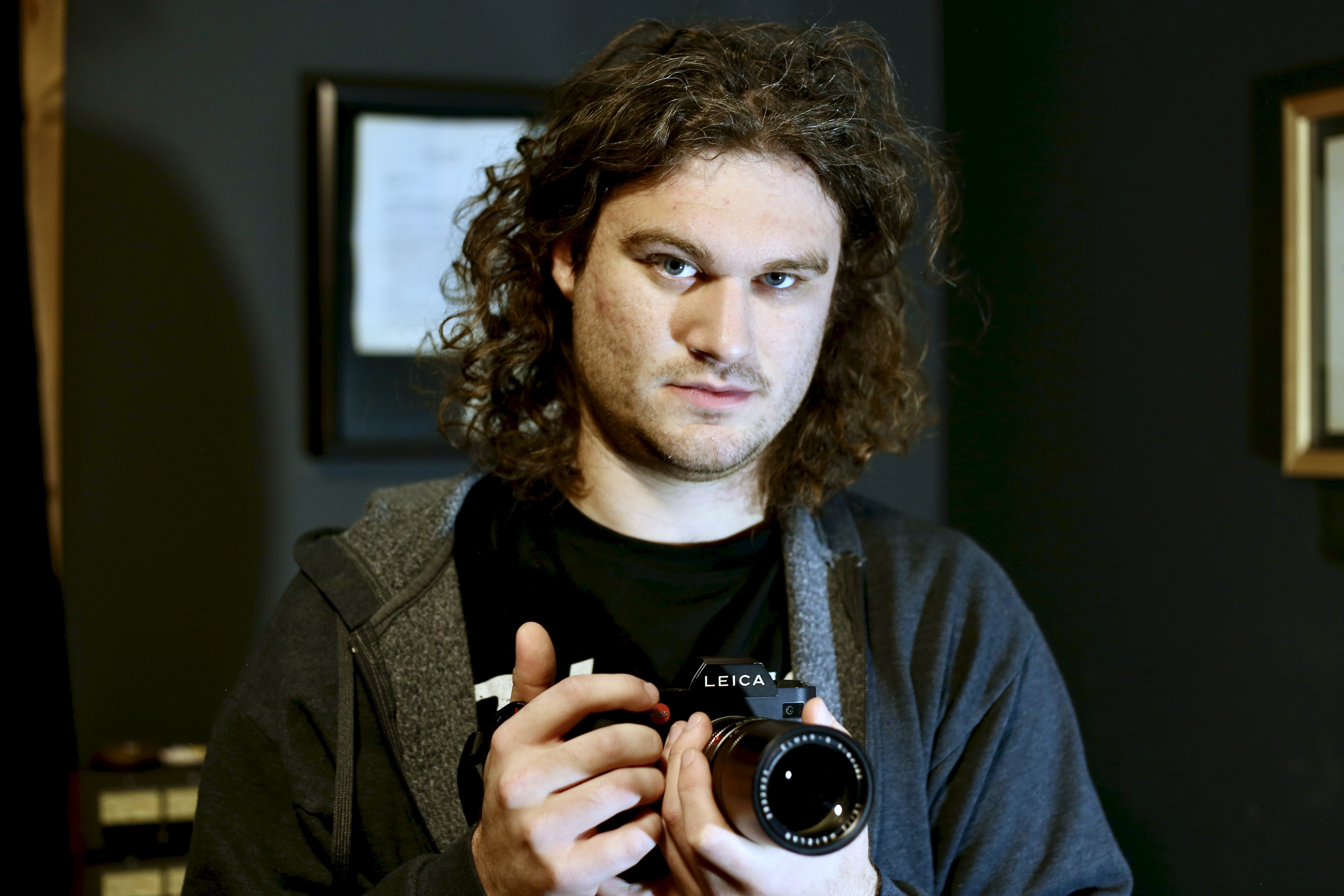
- Hazard in 2025
- Born: December 8, 2001 (age 24); Nashville, Tennessee
- Education: Lewis S. Mills High School CSB Media Arts Center
- Occupations: Photographer; filmmaker; musician
- Years active: 2015–present
- Musical career
- Genres: Rock
- Instruments: Guitar; vocals
- Website: prestonhazard.com

Preston Hazard (born December 8, 2001) is an American filmmaker, photographer, and musician who created the animated series Fundamentally Cynical, which streamed on Amazon Prime Video.

== Early life and education ==
Hazard was born in Nashville, Tennessee and grew up in Connecticut. He became interested in photography during elementary school after receiving a Canon point and shoot camera from his grandfather. He later experimented with video using a VHS camcorder. Hazard attended Lewis S. Mills High School in Burlington, Connecticut.

== Career ==
=== Television Career and Prime Video ===
As a teenager, Hazard began uploading short animated videos to YouTube. One of his early projects, The Garbage Can Man Show, gained attention by Amazon Prime Video and was later made available on the platform. The series featured contributions from musicians including members of the Berks County rock band John Flywheel.

=== Fundamentally Cynical ===
In 2019, Hazard created a second animated series, Fundamentally Cynical, which streamed on Amazon Prime Video for two seasons. The series uses an intentionally surreal and off beat style. Hazard worked with several musicians on the project, including members of John Flywheel and Anthrophobia, the latter of which created the theme song for the series. Seattle based musician Thomas Andrew Doyle, and member of the band TAD, contributed voice work and music for multiple episodes.

=== Independent Work ===
After attending CSB Media Arts Center, he began working independently as a photographer and videographer. He later established Machine Head Productions, a small production company that creates commercial and promotional video projects.

== Music career ==
Hazard plays guitar along with several other instruments. He has played guitar since childhood and writes original material. He has also worked with musicians outside his own projects, including former Pearl Jam drummer Dave Abbruzzese.

== Style and influences ==
Hazard’s animated work has been described as influenced by series such as Rick and Morty, Futurama, and Ren & Stimpy.

In music, Hazard has cited The Doors as an influence both musically and for his personal style. His approach to still photography heavily inspired by the nature focused images in National Geographic.
