= John Wiard House =

Historic house in Connecticut, United States

- U.S. National Register of Historic Places
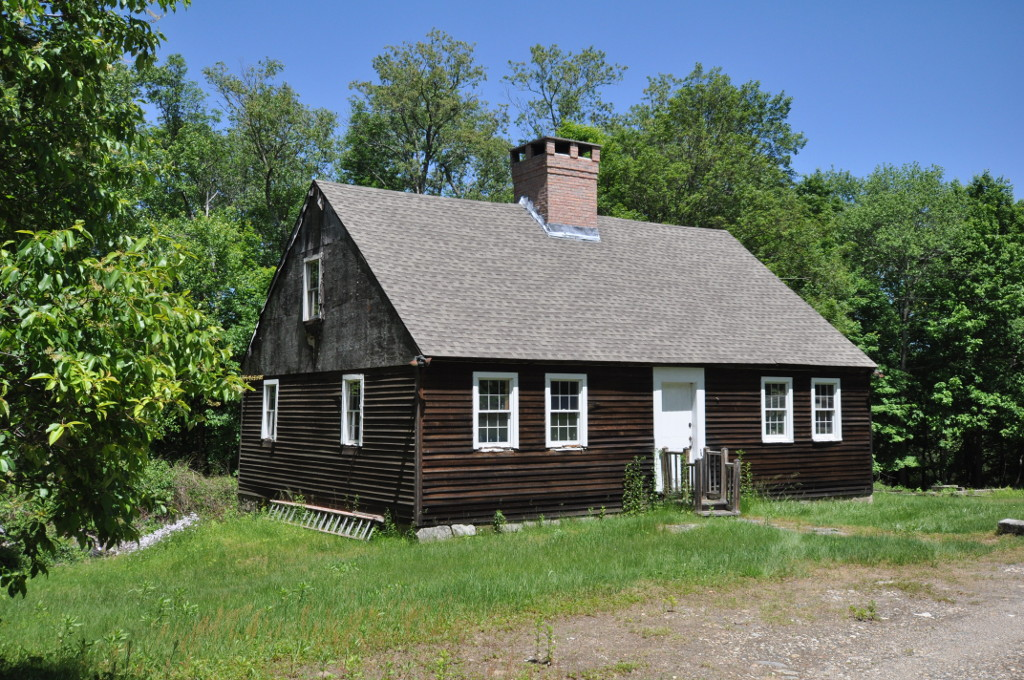

- Location within Connecticut Location within the United States
- Location: Spielman Highway, Burlington, Connecticut
- Coordinates: 41°46′33″N 72°58′50″W
- Area: 0.1 acres (0.040 ha)
- Built: 1754
- NRHP reference No.: 82004394
- Added to NRHP: March 25, 1982

The John Wiard House is a historic house on Spielman Highway in Burlington, Connecticut. Probably built about 1754, it is a well-preserved example of period rural vernacular residential architecture. It was listed on the National Register of Historic Places in 1982.

== Description and history ==
The John Wiard House stands in a rural setting northwest of the village center of Burlington, on the northeast corner of Upson Road and Spielman Highway (Connecticut Route 4). It is set well back from the highway, which originally passed much closer to its front door. The house is a 1 1/2-story timber-frame structure, with a side gable roof, central chimney, and clapboarded exterior. Its main facade is five bays, with a central entrance flanked by symmetrically placed sash windows. The doorway is topped by a four-light transom window. A single-story gabled addition extends to the rear of the main block. The interior has a significant number of original period features, including fireplace surrounds, builtin cabinets, flooring, doors, and hardware. Some features date to a c. 1810 renovation.

The land on which the house stands was purchased by John Wiard in 1754, and it is assumed he built this house not long afterward. Wiard was one of the first English settlers in the area that was later incorporated as Burlington. Wiard's father was one of the major landowners in Farmington, which the area was then part of. The early 19th-century alterations to the house were probably made by John's son Seth.

== See also ==
- National Register of Historic Places listings in Hartford County, Connecticut
