= Seventh Day Baptist Cemetery =

Cemetery in Hartford County, Connecticut

Coordinates: 41.7836°N 72.9739°W

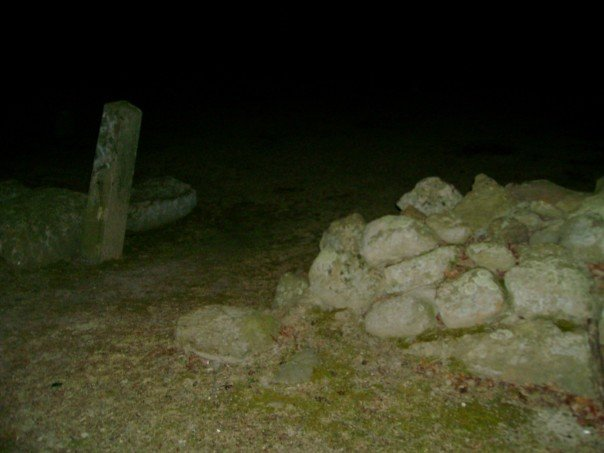
The entrance to Green Lady Cemetery in 2007

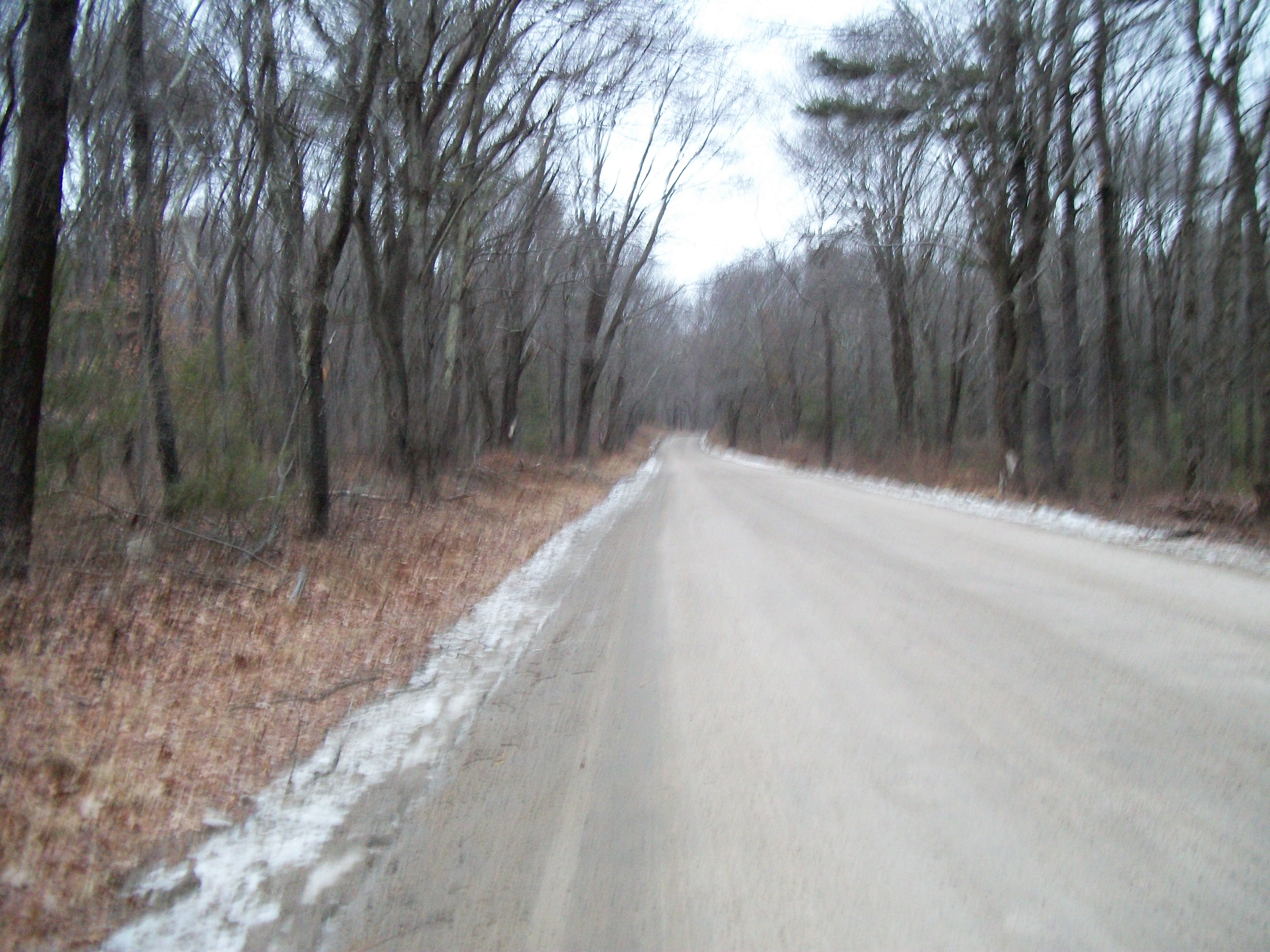
Upson Road, Burlington, Connecticut

Seventh Day Baptist Cemetery is a cemetery located on Upson Road in Burlington, Connecticut which dates back to the late 18th century. It was used as a burial ground for members of the Seventh Day Baptist Church. The cemetery has mistakenly been referred to as "Burlington Center Cemetery" but is known to locals as Green Lady Cemetery, due to a ghost that is purported to haunt the grounds.

== History ==
The Seventh Day Baptists (or Sabbatarians) were a Christian group that originated in Rhode Island. Many of them were descendants of the Roger Williams colony. In the late 18th century, approximately 20 families migrated from Rhode Island to West Britain, Connecticut (present-day Burlington) and established the Seventh Day Baptist Church on September 18, 1780. At the meeting of the Seventh Day Baptist Society on October 12, 1796, a deed was presented by Jared Covey (the benefactor of the church) to the other members detailing a "parcel of land laying at the south east corner of the ninth lot in the fourth division in Bristol containing about half an acre for the purpose of a public burying ground". The site had already been used as a burial ground, beginning in 1780 with the burial of John Davis, but it was in 1796 when it was officially declared as Seventh Day Baptist Cemetery.

By 1820, the last of the Seventh Day Baptists departed Burlington, and migrated to Brookfield, New York in Madison County, never to return to the area. The last person to be interred in the cemetery was Charlotte Spencer on October 14, 1881.

== Present ==
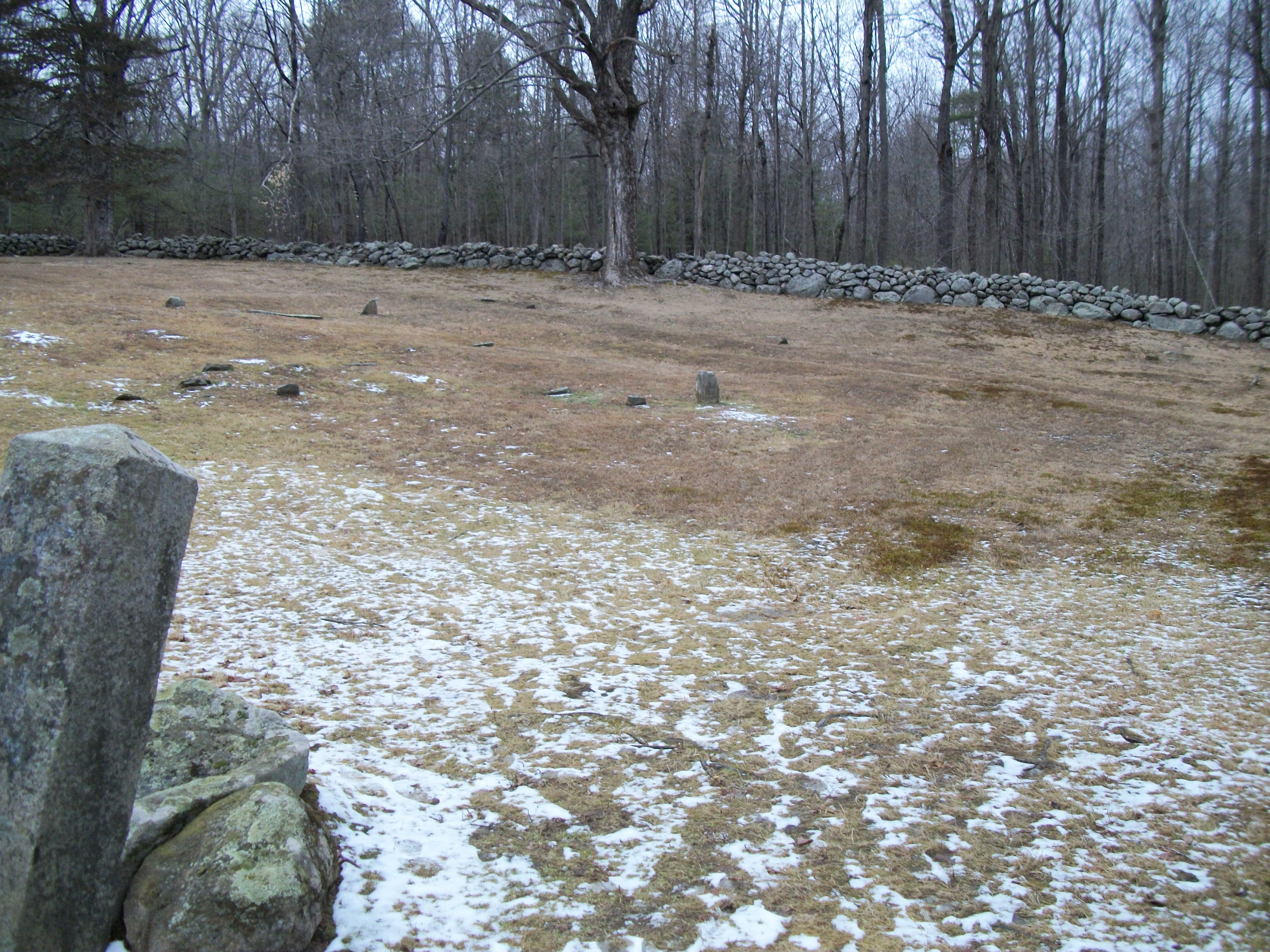
Green Lady Cemetery 2016

Today, there are no full standing headstones, due to vandalism that took place in the 1970s and again in 2010, and also as a result of weathering. The only standing headstone was that of Elisabeth Palmiter, and that stone remained in the cemetery until 2010. Sometime between 7:30am on July 20 and 11am on July 21, some individuals stole the 200-pound headstone of Elisabeth Palmiter. This was a roughly 200 pound grave marker that was re-dedicated to the site in the 1970s, following the removal of all vandalized pieces of the original stones. The cemetery is now private property (owned by the New Britain Public Works) and the Burlington police and local residents usually patrol the area at night to guard against further vandalism. Visiting the site during the day for the purpose of historical research is permitted.
