= Treadwell House =

Historic house in Connecticut, United States

- U.S. National Register of Historic Places
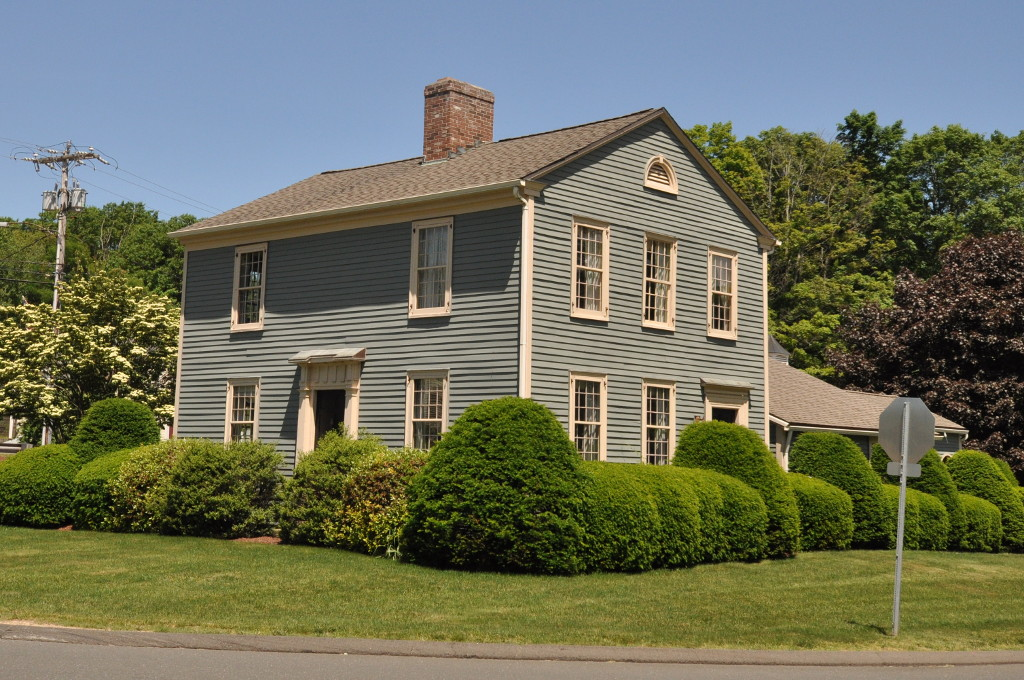

- Location within Connecticut Location within the United States
- Location: 253 Spielman Highway, Burlington, Connecticut
- Coordinates: 41°46′8″N 72°57′52″W
- Area: 0.5 acres (0.20 ha)
- Built: 1810
- Architectural style: Greek Revival, Federal
- NRHP reference No.: 82004395
- Added to NRHP: April 27, 1982

The Treadwell House is a historic house at 253 Spielman Highway in the center of Burlington, Connecticut. Built about 1810 for John Treadwell, then the Governor of Connecticut, it is a distinctive local example of Federal period architecture with Greek Revival overlay features. It was listed on the National Register of Historic Places in 1982. It is now used for commercial purposes.

== Description and history ==
The Treadwell House stands in the village center of Burlington, on the east side of its triangular green, between George Washington Turnpike and Spielman Highway (Connecticut Route 4). It is a 2 1/2-story wood-frame structure, with a gabled roof, central chimney, and clapboarded exterior. Its primary facade faces south toward the turnpike, while a secondary facade faces west to the green, with the roof ridge oriented north–south. The south facade is three bays wide, with the main entrance in the right bay. The door and windows are framed by modest mouldings, and there is a half-round opening (presently filled with a louver, but originally with a window) in the gable above. The west facade is also three bays wide, with a more elaborate but false entrance at its center, framed by pilasters and topped by an entablature and cornice. A modernized ell extends eastward from the main block.

The house was built about 1810 for John Treadwell, a Farmington native who was then serving as Governor of Connecticut; however, there is no evidence he ever actually resided here, since his residence was always listed as Farmington. The house is remarkably little-altered, and some of its Greek Revival features are a notably early adoption of that style. The next two owners of the house were ministers at the local Congregational church. The building was purchased by the town in 1970, which used it for storage. Declared surplus in the late 1970s, it was rescued from demolition by local preservationists, and readapted for use as a bank.

== See also ==
- National Register of Historic Places listings in Hartford County, Connecticut
