= Lewis S. Mills High School =

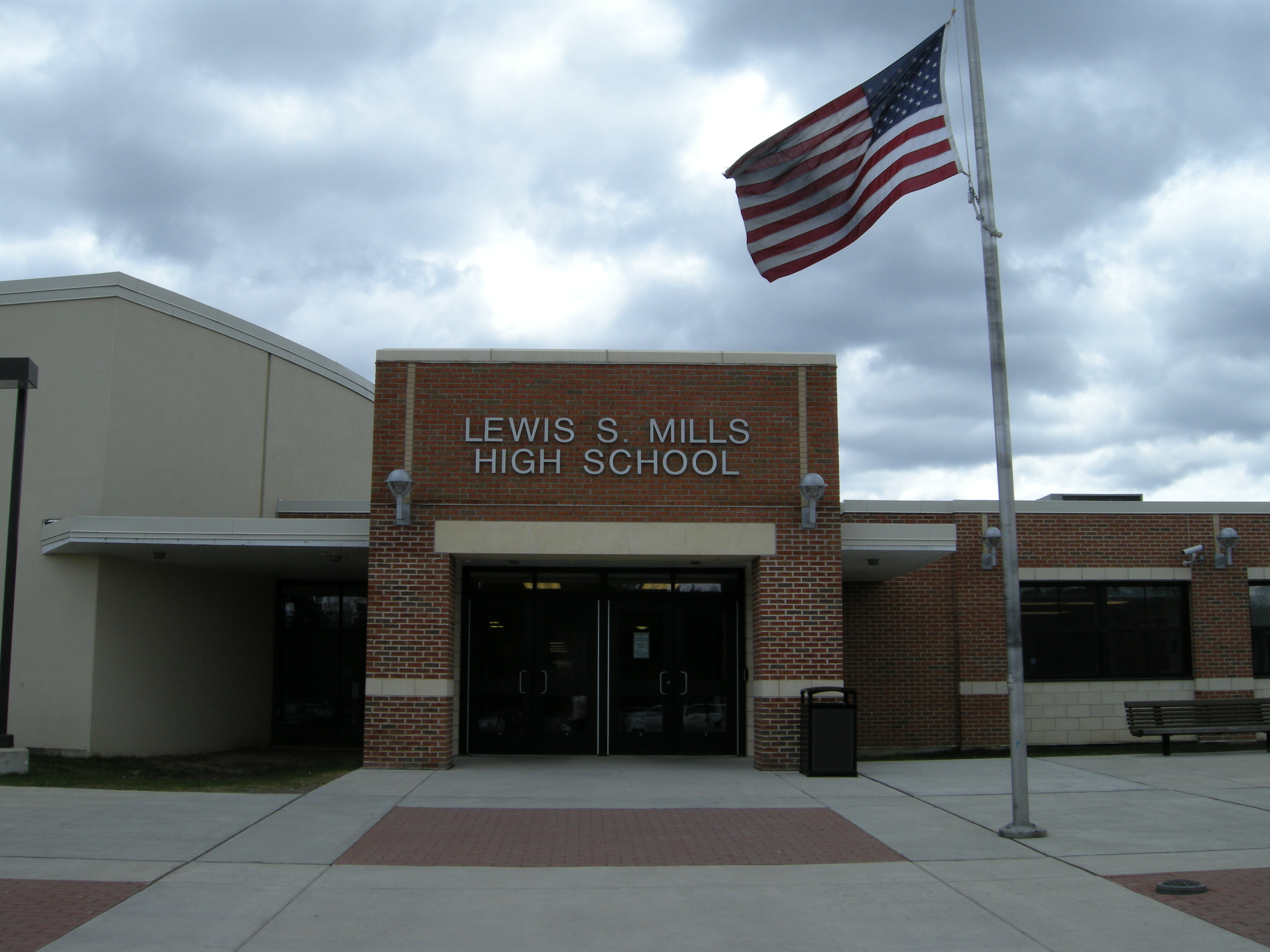
- Main entrance of the high school

Location
- 26 Lyon Road; Burlington, Connecticut 06013; United States; 41°46′48″N 72°59′15″W

Information
- Type: Public high school
- Motto: "Whose House? Mills House!"
- School district: Regional School District 10
- CEEB code: 070807
- NCES School ID: 090352000730
- Principal: Christopher Rau
- Teaching staff: 55.00 (on an FTE basis)
- Grades: 9–12
- Enrollment: 627 (2023-2024)
- Student to teacher ratio: 11.40
- Campus type: Rural
- Colors: Blue and White
- Mascot: Spartan
- Website: lewis.region10ct.org

Lewis S. Mills High school banner on light pole 05/07/2026

Lewis S. Mills High School is a public high school in Burlington, Connecticut. The school is part of Connecticut Regional School District 10 and serves the two towns of Burlington and Harwinton, which border one another. Until the opening of Lewis S. Mills High School, high school students in Burlington and Harwinton attended high school in neighboring towns, such as Farmington.

== Name ==
After the completion of the school's construction in November 1960, a contest was held to determine a name for the newly built regional high school. Some of the proposed names for the school attempted to combine the names of the two towns that it served, which included "Har-Bur", a name latter adopted by the middle school.

The name eventually decided upon for the school in the contest was "Lewis S. Mills High School", taking its name from Lewis S. Mills, a local educator and author who had managed schools in both Burlington and Harwinton during the 1910s and 1920s. A few weeks after the announcement of the school's naming, a dedication ceremony was held which featured the school's namesake.

== Controversy ==
In 1999, Lewis S. Mills High School was named in "Doe v. Vibert", where the former gym teacher, David Vibert, sexually molested and abused a student in Regional School District No. 10 from age thirteen to eighteen both at the Har-Bur Middle School and the Lewis S. Mills High School. Vibert was employed by the Board of Education as a physical education teacher at the Har-Bur Middle School which the plaintiff attended from 1980 to 1982 and continued that employment during the period of the plaintiff's later schooling at the Mills High School during which time his sexual abuse continued.

Between the time the plaintiff attended Lewis S. Mills High School to when the lawsuit was brought forward, there had been several other reports from students, parents, and faculty regarding David Vibert as he would repeatedly have female students in his office with the door closed during lunch periods.

Lewis S. Mills High School was named in Doninger v. Niehoff, a civil rights lawsuit brought by (former student) Avery Doninger, against Principal Karissa Niehoff (now retired) and Superintendent (now retired) Paula Schwartz. In spring 2007, Doninger posted a blog entry criticizing the administration and encouraging students to email or call the school regarding the scheduling of Jamfest (a school event). She also referred to the administration as "douchebags". When the blog was discovered some weeks later by the superintendent's 36-year-old son, the administration banned Doninger from running for a class officer position. Doninger won by write-in, but the write-in votes were not recognized. Doninger lost a hearing for injunctive relief when district court Judge Mark Kravitz ruled that there was not a substantial likelihood that Doninger would win her case against the school and thus declined to grant the injunction.

On May 29, 2008, a US Second Circuit Court of Appeals upheld a lower court ruling that the administration had acted within the bounds of their authority. The court made the ruling not so much because of the "douchebags" comment, but because her encouragement of students to contact the administration could cause a "foreseeable risk of substantial disruption to the work and discipline of the school." She had said on her blog that students could contact the Superintendent "to piss her off more". The court stressed that their decision was not an endorsement of schools regulating off-campus speech. Thomas Gerarde, representing the school district, was quick to assert that "any speech that is likely to come to the attention of administrators on campus, even though it’s off campus, will be subject to discipline if it’s disruptive."

Doninger and her mother have said that they will attempt to bring the case to jury trial. She graduated on June 20, 2008.

On April 25, 2011, the US Second Circuit Court of Appeals (based in NYC) "ruled 3-0 that school administrators did not violate “clearly established” First Amendment precedent."

== Notable alumni ==
- Benjamin M. Flowers, 10th Solicitor General of Ohio
- Preston Hazard, filmmaker and musician
