= Sessions Woods Wildlife Management Area =

Nature preserve in Burlington, Connecticut

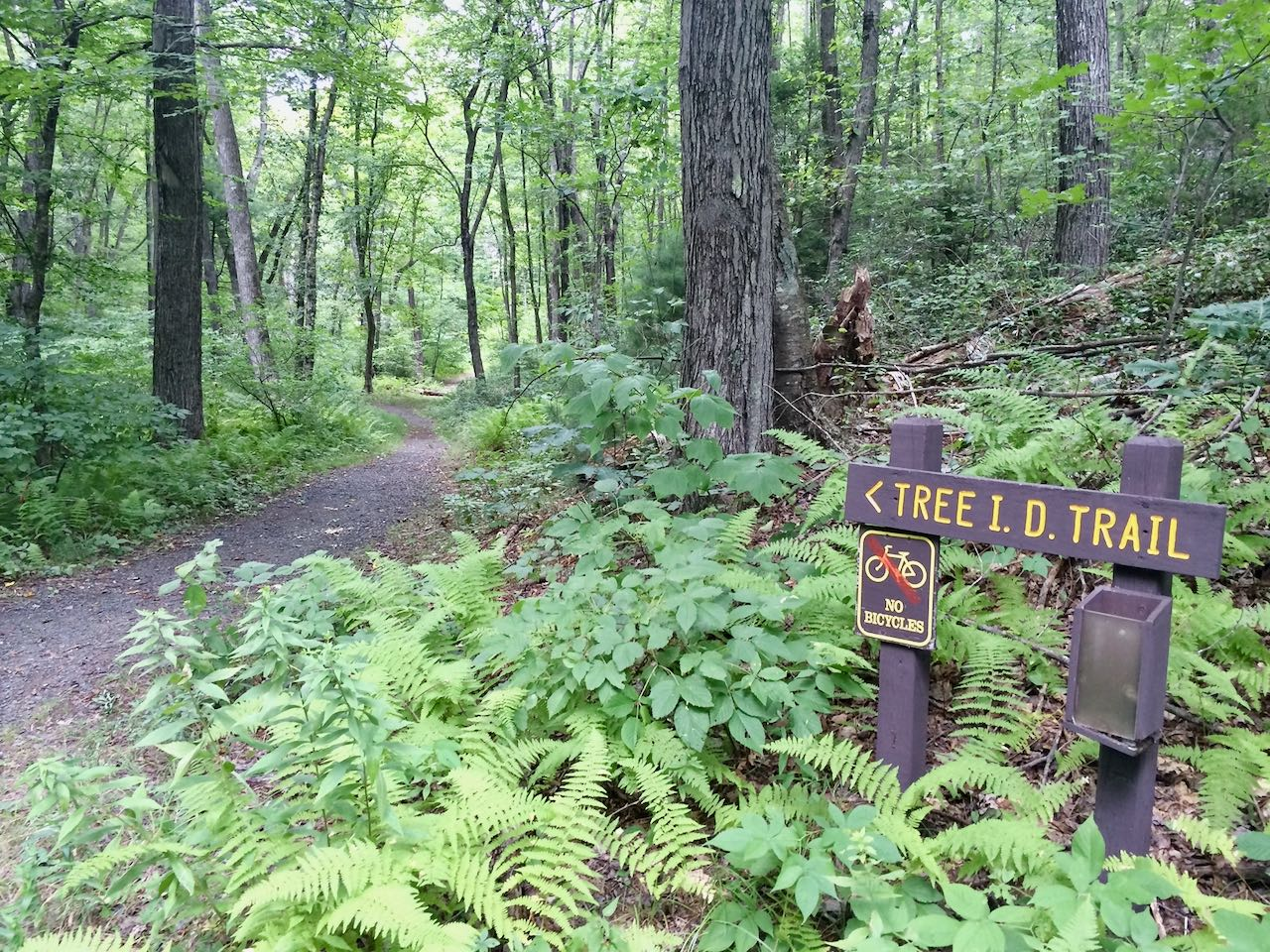

- Location within Connecticut Location within the United States
- Location: Burlington, Connecticut, United States
- Coordinates: 41°43′42″N 72°57′44″W
- Area: 771 acres (312 ha)
- Administrator: Connecticut Department of Energy and Environmental Protection
- Website: Official website

Sessions Woods Wildlife Management Area is a 771-acre (312 ha) nature preserve owned by the state of Connecticut located in Burlington, Connecticut. Operated by the Connecticut Department of Energy and Environmental Protection, the preserve focuses on conservation education and features the Sessions Woods Conservation Education Center with displays about area wildlife and a large meeting room. The WMA offers educational programs, demonstrations, and workshops about wildlife and natural resource management. Outside there are demonstration sites, self-guided hiking trails, and displays. Hunting is allowed with permits.

The trails connect to the Blue-Blazed Tunxis Trail. The WMA also abuts the Nassahegon State Forest.

The Friends of Session Woods is a volunteer organization that supports the preserve's programs and activities.
