= Hitchcock-Schwarzmann Mill =

- U.S. National Register of Historic Places
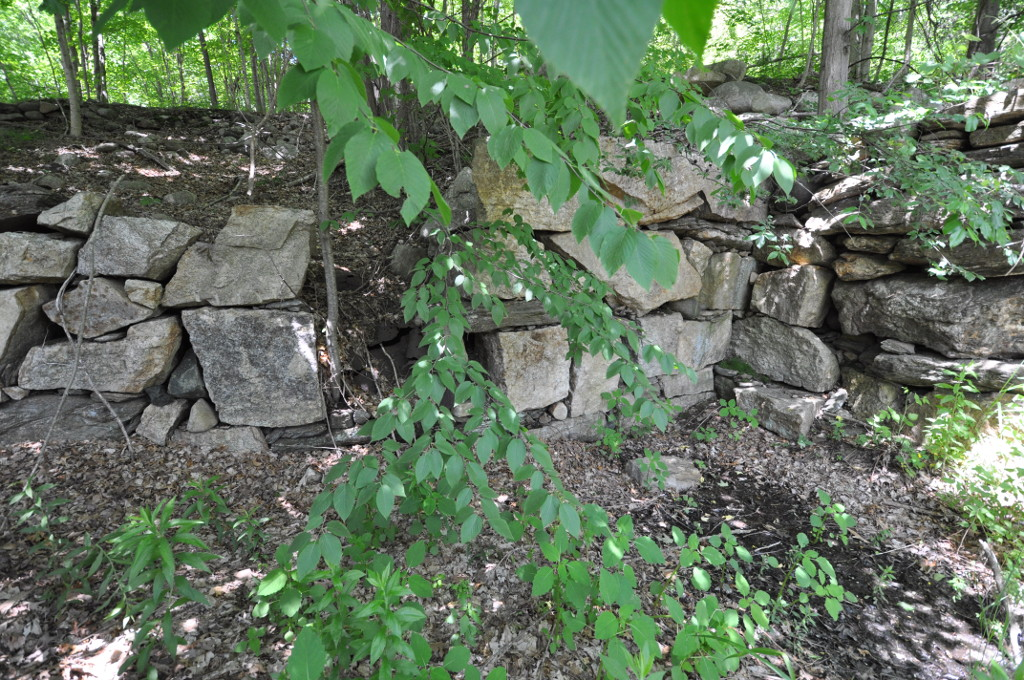
- Foundational remains of mill, 2019

- Location within Connecticut Location within the United States
- Location: Foote Road at Vineyard Road, Burlington, Connecticut
- Coordinates: 41°46′54″N 72°57′42″W
- Area: 3 acres (1.2 ha)
- Built: 1781
- Architectural style: Vernacular Industrial
- NRHP reference No.: 77001409
- Added to NRHP: September 13, 1977

The Hitchcock-Schwarzmann Mill was a historic industrial building at the junction of Foote and Vineyard Roads in Burlington, Connecticut. Built about 1781 and repeatedly enlarged and altered, it was the town's only surviving 18th-century mill building. It was listed on the National Register of Historic Places in 1977, and has subsequently been demolished.

== Description and history ==
The Hitchcock-Schwarzmann Mill stood in a rural area of northern Burlington, at the northeast corner of Foote and Vineyard Roads. The mill was a rambling collection of attached wood-frame structures, its main building set over a branch of Burlington Brook, which provided the power used by the mill. The main block was a 2 1/2-story timber-framed building, with heavy pegged timbers and kingpost roof trusses. South of this was a shed-roof single-story element, and there were three smaller structures attached to the western end. To the south stands an 18th-century miller's house, a 1 1/2-story Cape style house with a five-bay facade and central chimney, and a similar house, also associated historically with the mill, stands a short way to the northeast. The mill building has been demolished, and only foundational remnants survive.

The main mill building was built about 1781, apparently by Jared Tyler, and was initially used for the grinding of grain. In the early 19th century the miller was Joel Hitchcock, and the property was purchased in 1880 by George Schwarzmann. By then it had been expanded to include a sawmill. The Schwarzmann family operated the mill until 1972, also adding a cider mill and shingle mill to the operation. The mill complex was purchased in 1976 by the Burlington Historical Society, which had the intention of adapting it as a museum property. At that time, it housed much of its original equipment, although its original waterwheel had been replaced in the 19th century by a then-modern turbine.

== See also ==
- National Register of Historic Places listings in Hartford County, Connecticut
