= Hart's Corner Historic District =

Historic district in Connecticut, United States

- U.S. National Register of Historic Places
- U.S. Historic district
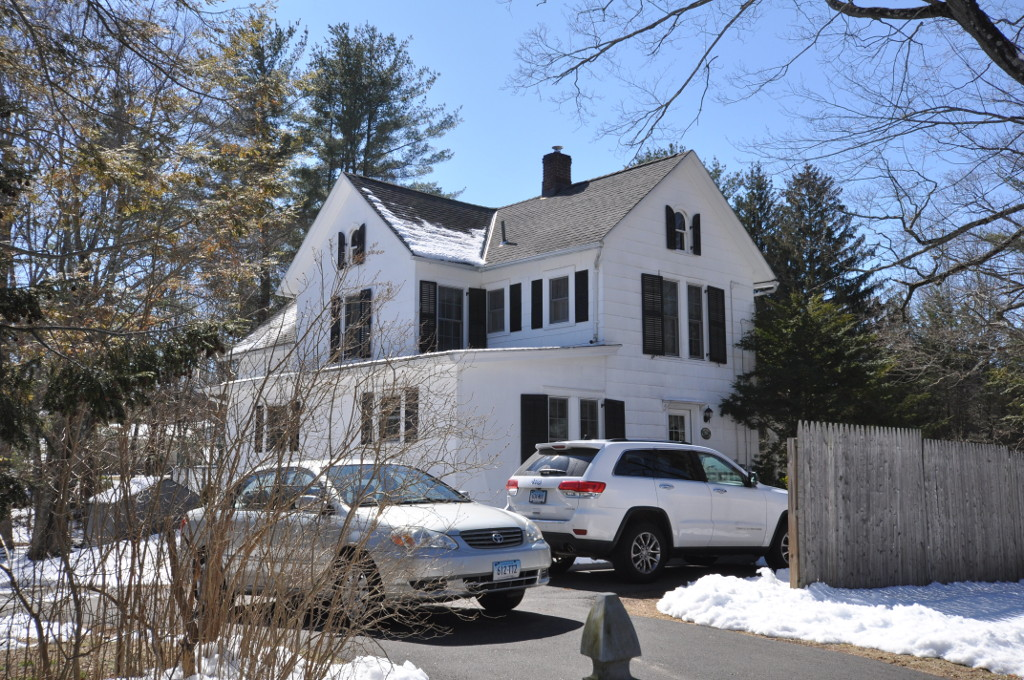

- Location within Connecticut Location within the United States
- Location: 247 Monce Road and 102 and 105 Stafford Road, Burlington, Connecticut
- Coordinates: 41°43′43.9″N 72°54′31.9″W
- Area: 70 acres (28 ha)
- Built: 1794
- Architectural style: Greek Revival, Italianate, Colonial cape
- NRHP reference No.: 87000351
- Added to NRHP: July 8, 1987

The Hart's Corner Historic District encompasses a microcosm of 19th-century agricultural history in southeastern Burlington, Connecticut. Set at the corner of Stafford and Monce Roads are three farmsteads, dating in age from the 1790s to 1874, all of which are well-preserved specimens of their style. The district was listed on the National Register of Historic Places in 1987.

== Description and history ==
Land in the Hart's Corner area was first allocated in the 18th-century colonial period to the Reverend Samuel Newell (father to same-named American missionary). Newell's daughters inherited that land, and sold it in the 1790s to Israel Barnes. Barnes built the oldest house at the corner before 1795, when he sold it to David Norton. Norton divided his land, selling the half across Stafford Street to his son Franklin, who built the Greek Revival house at 102 Stafford Street around 1850. Sylvester Hart married David Norton's daughter, and acquired the original farmstead in 1852. His son George Washington Hart built the Italianate farmhouse at 105 Stafford Street. Although modern suburban residential development has encroached on the cluster from the east, and the road intersection was straightened in 1980, the 19th-century character of this corner is still discernible.

The old farmstead built by Israel Barnes is a 1-1/2 story Cape style structure located on the west side of the Stafford-Monce Road junction. It is accompanied by a small collection of mainly 19th-century outbuildings, including at least one barn. Sixty acres of former farmland behind the house are also included in the district; these have been donated to a land conservation group. The Franklin Norton House is located at the northeast corner of the junction; it is 2-1/2 stories in height, with aluminum siding, but still exhibits a number of Greek Revival features from its original period of construction. The George Washington Hart House is at the southeast corner.

== See also ==
- National Register of Historic Places listings in Hartford County, Connecticut
