= Nepaug State Forest =

State forest in Connecticut, US

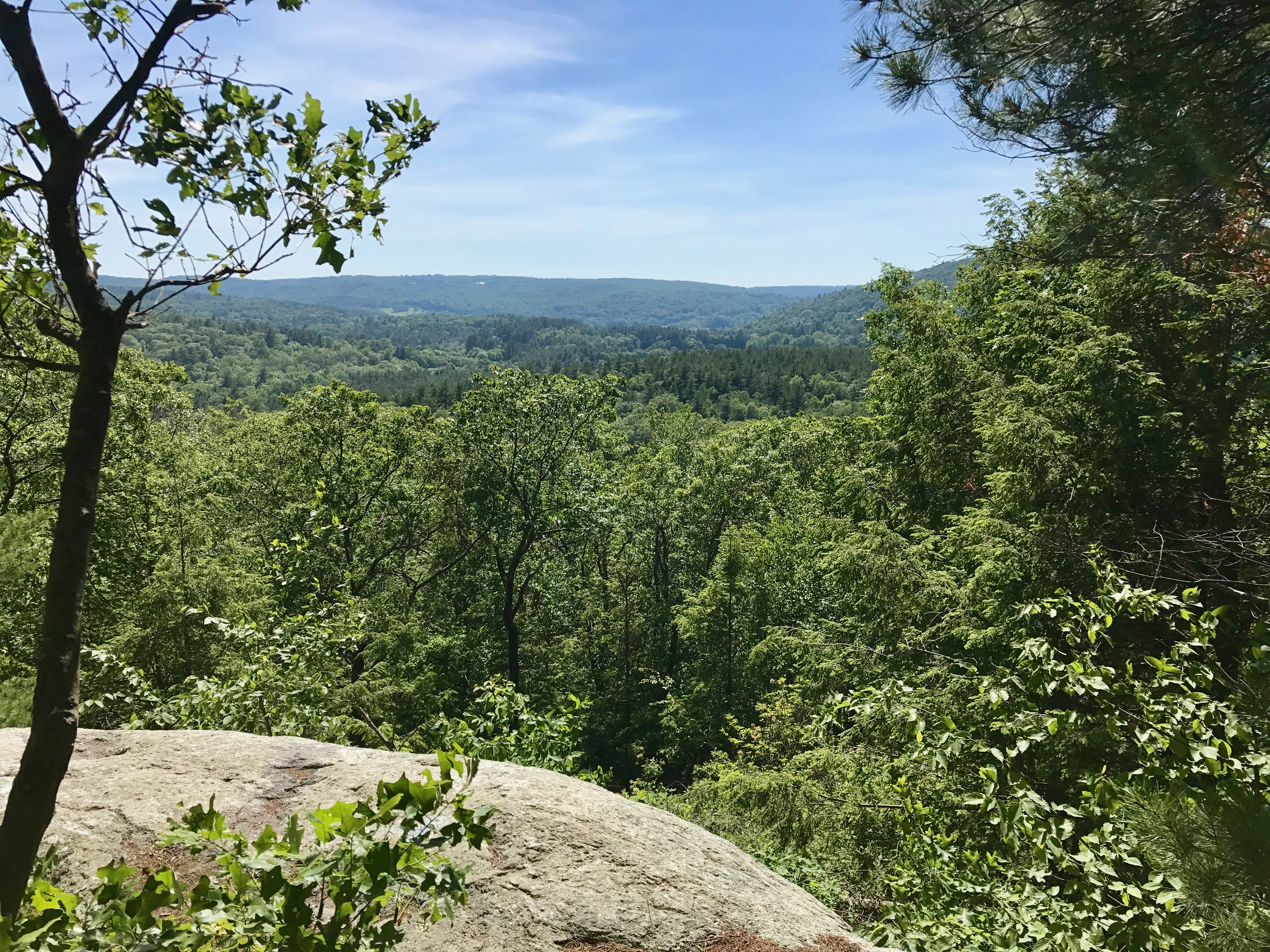
- Nepaug Valley and Yellow Mountain from the Valley Outlook Trail

- Location within Connecticut Location within the United States
- Location: New Hartford, Connecticut, United States
- Coordinates: 41°50′16″N 72°57′27″W
- Area: 1,373 acres (556 ha)
- Elevation: 581 ft (177 m)
- Established: 1942
- Administrator: Connecticut Department of Energy and Environmental Protection
- Website: Nepaug State Forest

Nepaug State Forest is a Connecticut state forest located primarily in the town of New Hartford. Trails that cross the forest include the blue-blazed Tunxis Trail.The forest offers hiking, biking, cross-country skiing, fishing, camping, and hunting. Letterboxing is no longer active in the forest.

== Gallery ==
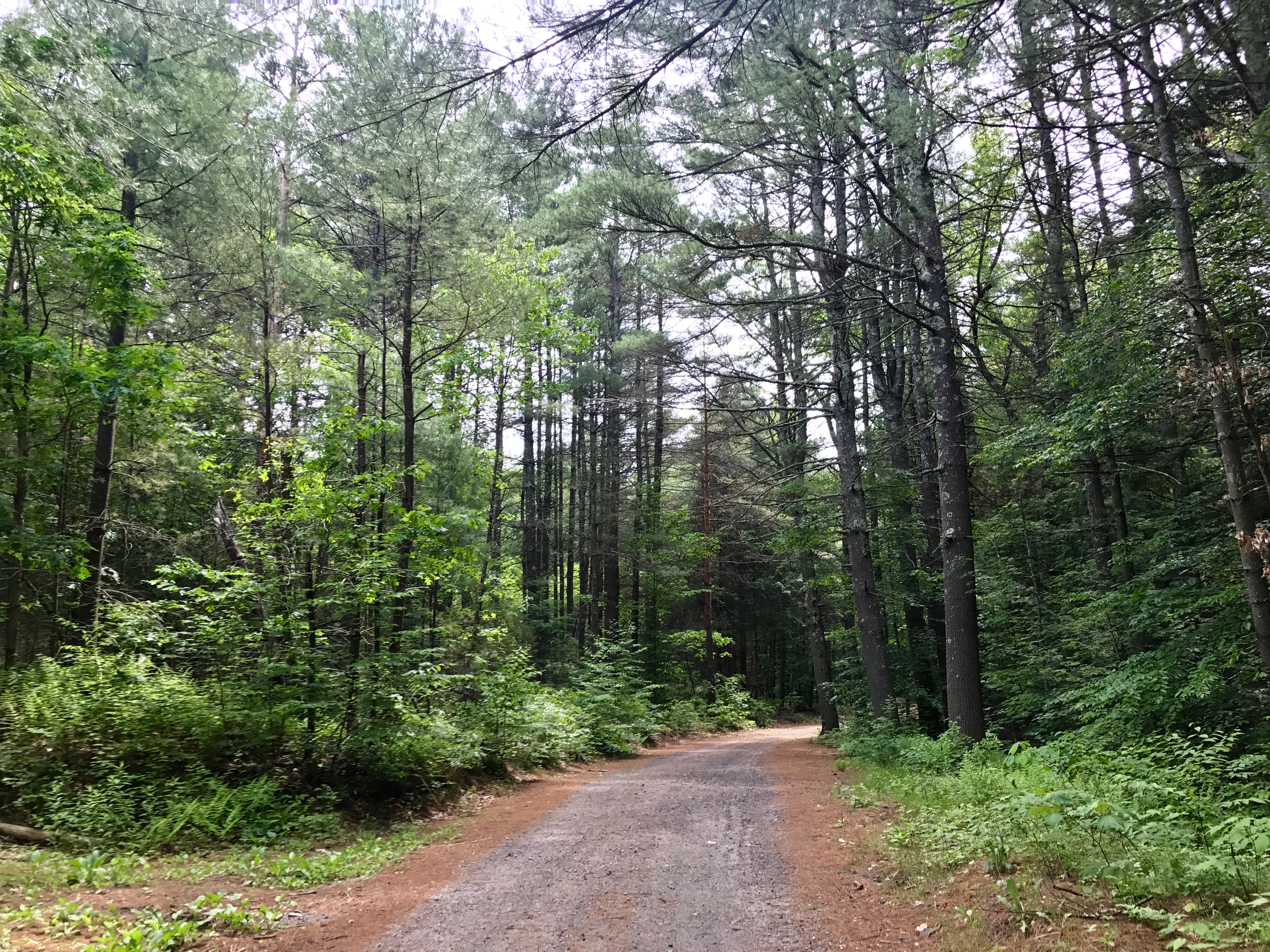
Nepaug State Forest's "Tunxis Trail" dirt road main entrance off CT-202 and parking lot.

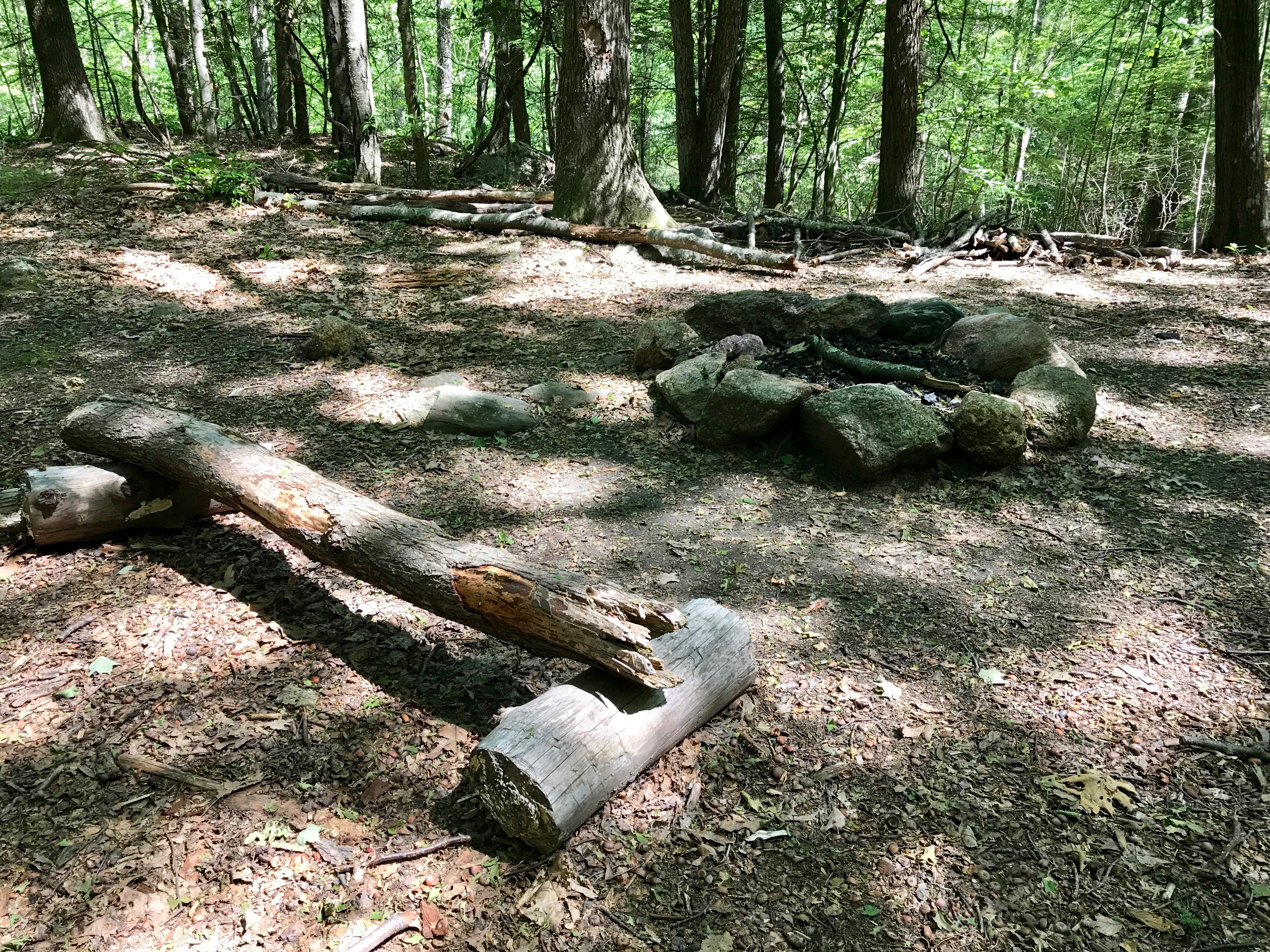
Nepaug State Forest's backpacking camping area—rock campfire ring and very rustic log bench.

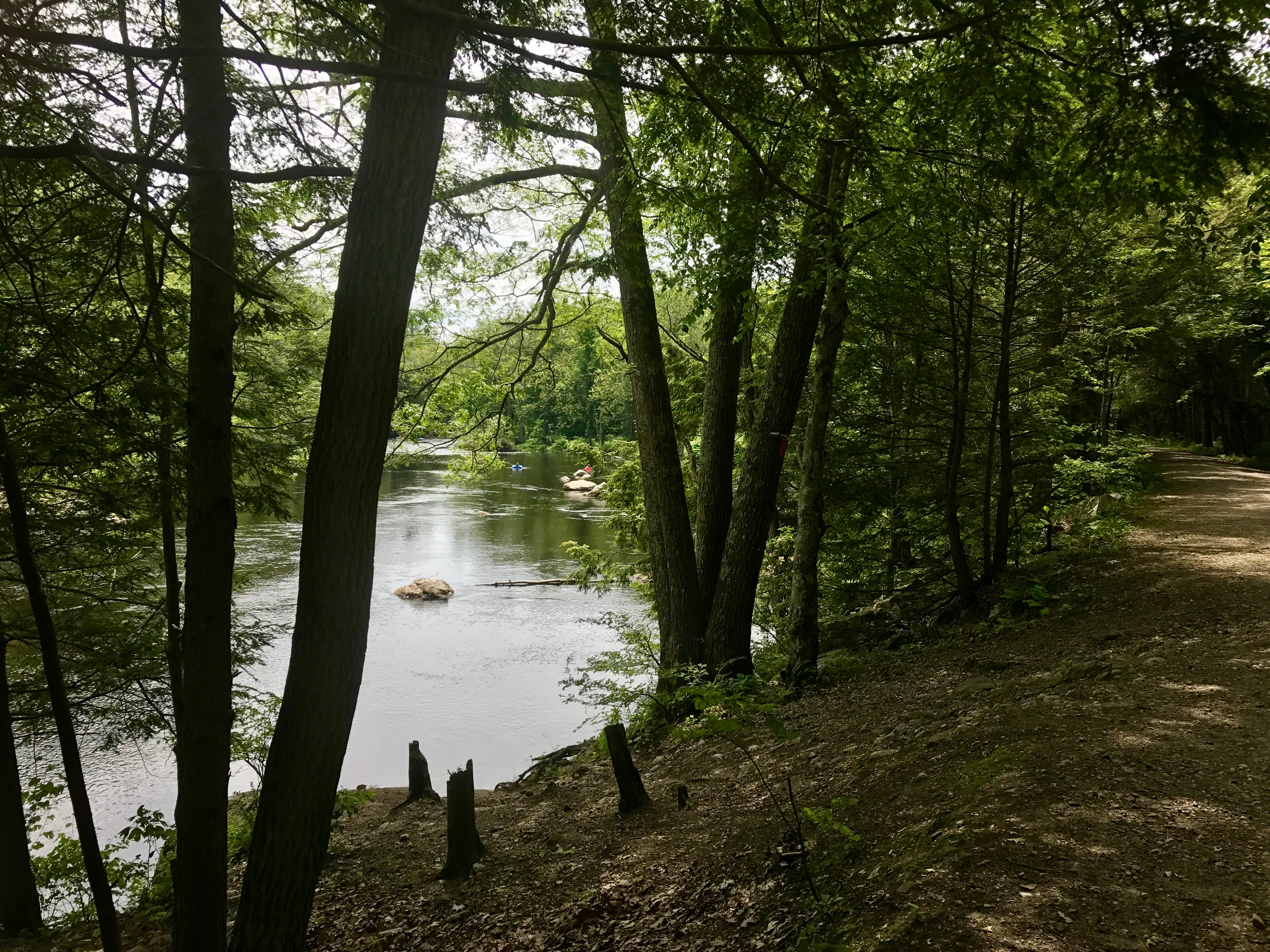
Farmington River Bank And River Road In Nepaug State Forest.

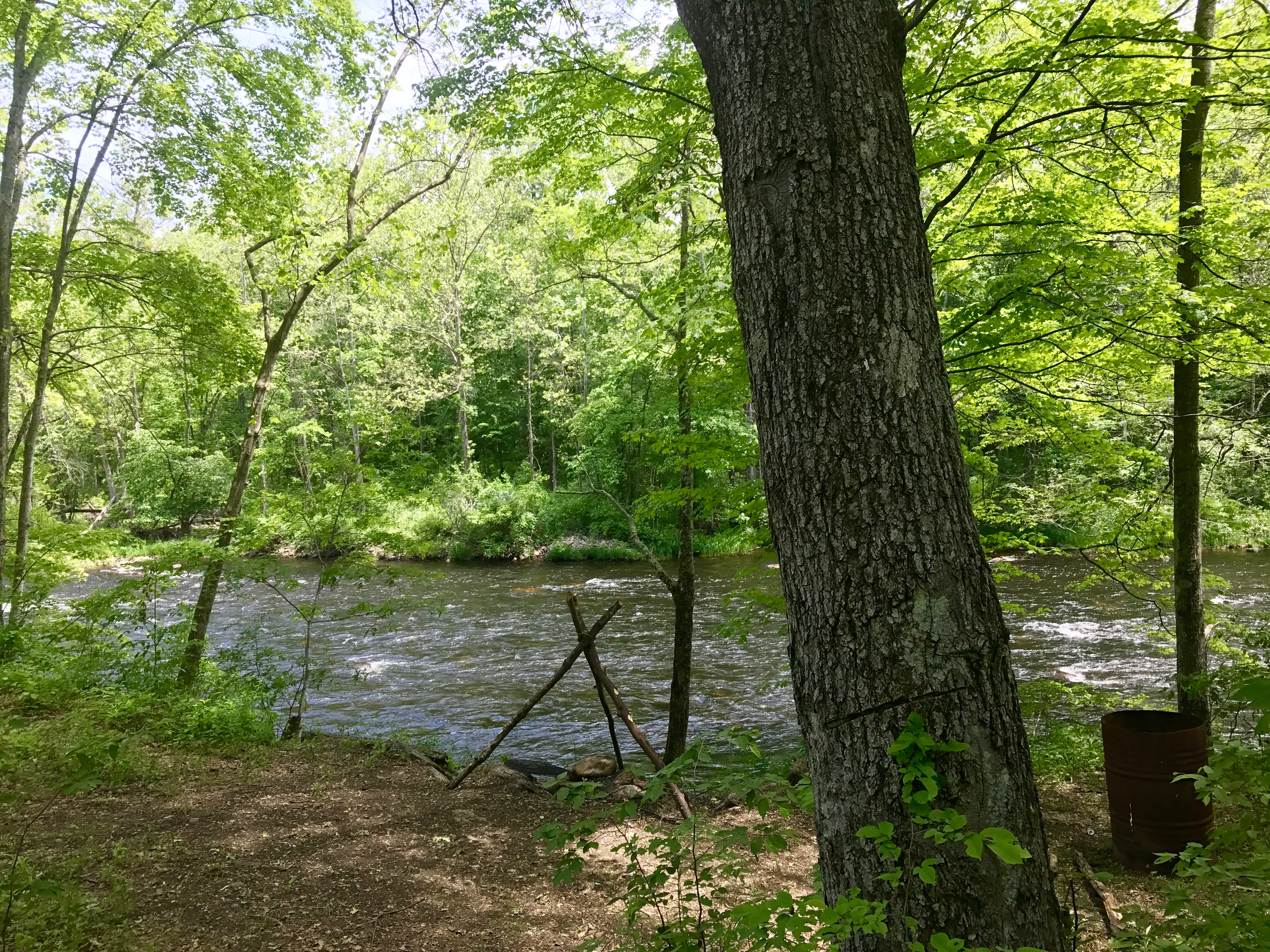
Farmington River Bank fishing spot in Nepaug State Forest.
