= Doninger v. Niehoff =

Student Speech

- Court: United States Court of Appeals for the Second Circuit
- Full case name: Lauren Doninger, P.P.A as Guardian and Next Friend of Avery Doninger, a minor v. Karissa Niehoff, Paula Schwartz
- Argued: March 4, 2008
- Decided: May 29, 2008
- Citation: 527 F.3d 41 (2d Cir. 2008)

Case history
- Prior history: 514 F. Supp. 2d 199 (D. Conn. 2007)
- Subsequent history: 642 F.3d 334 (2d Cir. 2011)

Court membership
- Judges sitting: Sonia Sotomayor, Debra Livingston, Loretta A. Preska (S.D.N.Y.)

Case opinions
- Majority: Livingston, joined by Sotomayor, Preska

Laws applied
- First Amendment

Doninger v. Niehoff, 527 F.3d 41 (2d Cir. 2008) was a United States Court of Appeals case. The case was heard by a three-judge Second Circuit panel that included Judges Sonia Sotomayor, Loretta A. Preska, and Debra Livingston. The case involved a student at Lewis S. Mills High School in Connecticut who was barred from the student government after she called the superintendent and other school officials "douchebags" in a LiveJournal blog post written while off-campus that encouraged students to call an administrator and "piss her off more". Judge Livingston held that the district judge did not abuse his discretion in holding that the student's speech "foreseeably create[d] a risk of substantial disruption within the school environment," which is the precedent in the Second Circuit for when schools may regulate off-campus speech On October 31, 2011, the United States Supreme Court declined to grant certiorari on Ms. Doninger's appeal.

== Criticism ==
Although Sotomayor did not write this opinion, she has been criticized by some who disagree with it.
