= Barkhamsted Lighthouse =

Archaeological site in Connecticut, United States

- Lighthouse Archeological Site (5-37)
- U.S. National Register of Historic Places
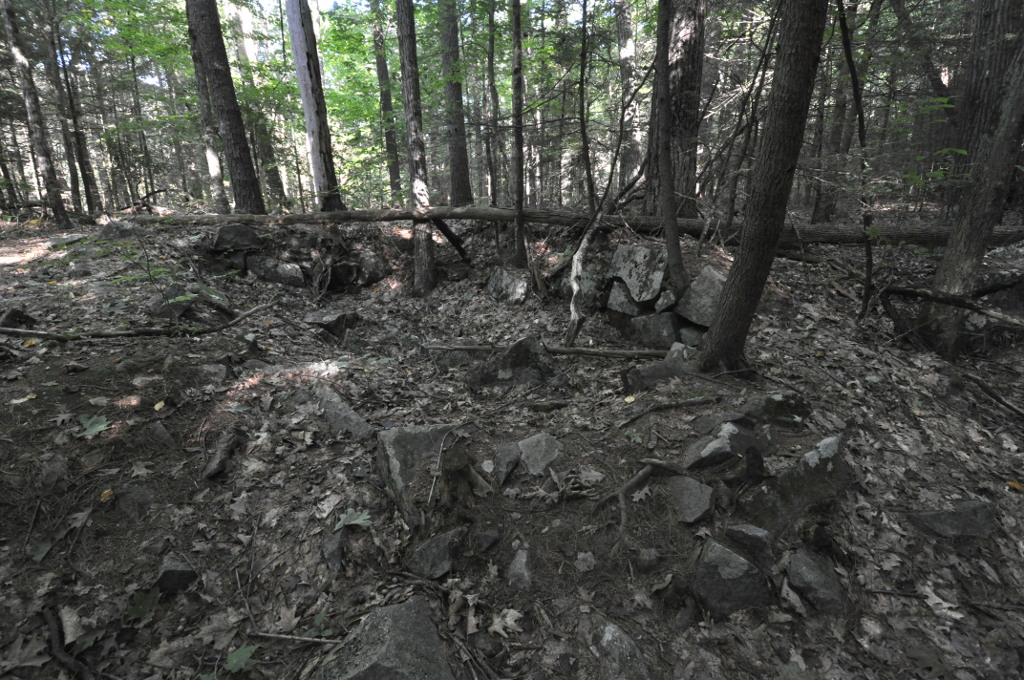
- One of the site's cellar holes

- Location within Connecticut Location within the United States
- Location: Peoples State Forest, Barkhamsted, Connecticut
- Coordinates: 41°55′33″N 73°0′24.2″W
- Area: 5 acres (2.0 ha)
- Built: 1740
- NRHP reference No.: 91000445
- Added to NRHP: April 25, 1991

The Barkhamsted Lighthouse was a historical community located in what is now Peoples State Forest in Barkhamsted, Connecticut. Set on a terrace above the eastern bank of the West Branch Farmington River, it was in the 18th and 19th centuries a small village of economically marginalized mixed Native American, African American, and white residents. It was given the name "lighthouse" because its lights acted as a beacon marking the north–south stage road that paralleled the river. The archaeological remains of the village site were listed on the National Register of Historic Places in 1991 as Lighthouse Archeological Site (5-37).

== History ==
The area known as the Lighthouse had its beginnings in the mid-18th century with the purchase of land by James Chaugham and later his son Samuel, a Narragansett from Block Island. Chaugham was said in early accounts of the community to have married Molly (or Mary) Barber, a white woman whose early life is absent from historical documents. The property was located in a rugged area of northern Connecticut that was then wilderness, with an old Native American trail running along the river. When this trail was improved into a stagecoach route in the late 18th century, the small settlement was dubbed the "lighthouse" by southbound coach drivers, as its lights indicated that the coach was nearing New Hartford, a few miles to the south. The community was eventually abandoned in the 1860s, its residents apparently moving to seek better economic opportunities.

The first organized history of the community was written in 1952 by Lewis Sprague Mills, a local educator and historian. Archaeological investigations of the site were first conducted on the settlement site in 1986 by Kenneth Feder. The site is located on a terrace on the shoulder of Ragged Mountain, a hill in Peoples State Forest. Excavations have uncovered foundational remains of ten buildings, four charcoal kilns, a well, and a small cemetery. Stone for the building foundations was apparently quarried directly nearby. None of the surviving elements give any indication of having been built using dimensional lumber that was used in more conventional communities. Also found at the site were quantities of typical household items, including a large number of ceramic fragments.

The site is accessible via a short hiking trail from East River Road in Peoples State Forest, and has been designated a state archaeological site.

== See also ==
- National Register of Historic Places listings in Litchfield County, Connecticut
