= Tunxis Trail =

Hiking trail in Connecticut, United States

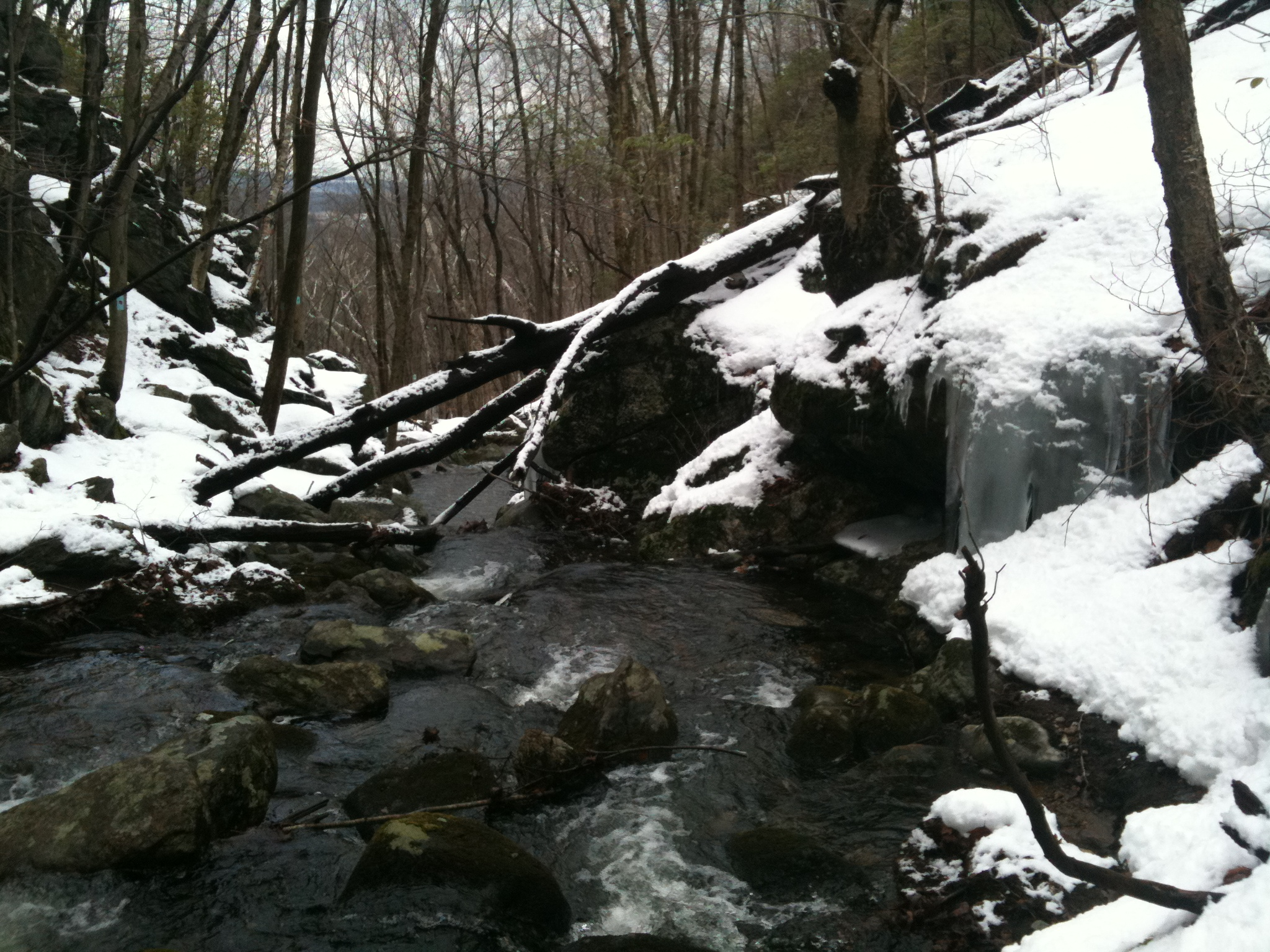
- Cussgutter Brook in Winter - Tunxis Compounce Cascade Side Trail
- Length: 79 mi (127 km)
- Location: Hartford / New Haven counties, Connecticut, USA
- Designation: CFPA Blue-Blazed Tunxis Trail System
- Use: hiking, cross-country skiing, snowshoeing, other
- Highest point: Pine Mountain, 1,378 ft (420 m)
- Lowest point: Farmington River, 150 ft (46 m)
- Difficulty: easy, with difficult sections
- Season: easiest spring to fall
- Hazards: hunters, deer ticks, poison ivy

The Tunxis Trail is a 79-mile (127 km) Blue-Blazed hiking trail "system" that traverses the western ridge of the central Connecticut Valley. The mainline (official "Blue" and "non-dot") trail is not completely contiguous, notably there are two gaps of several miles (between the Southington and Burlington sections and between the Burlington section and the Nepaug section).

The Tunxis Trail is composed of eighteen (18) trails of which one is the primarily North-to-South mainline trail plus a number of shorter side trails. Despite being easily accessible and close to large population centers, the trail is considered to be rugged and scenic.

Its features include the Lake Compounce Amusement Park (and its "non-ski lift"), "Tory Den", the "Mile of Ledges", colonial era cemeteries, several caves (including the "Indian Council Caves"), waterfalls, cliff faces, woodlands, swamps, lakes, river flood plains, farmland, historic sites, and the summits of Pine Mountain and Southington Mountain. The Tunxis Trail, maintained largely through the efforts of the Connecticut Forest and Park Association.

The Tunxis Trail system, at approximately 79 miles in length, is the longest of the Blue-Blazed Trails maintained by the Connecticut Forest and Park Association.

Because the trail runs parallel to the Metacomet Trail there are several views from the Tunxis Trail of Metacomet Ridge features to the east.

== Trail description ==
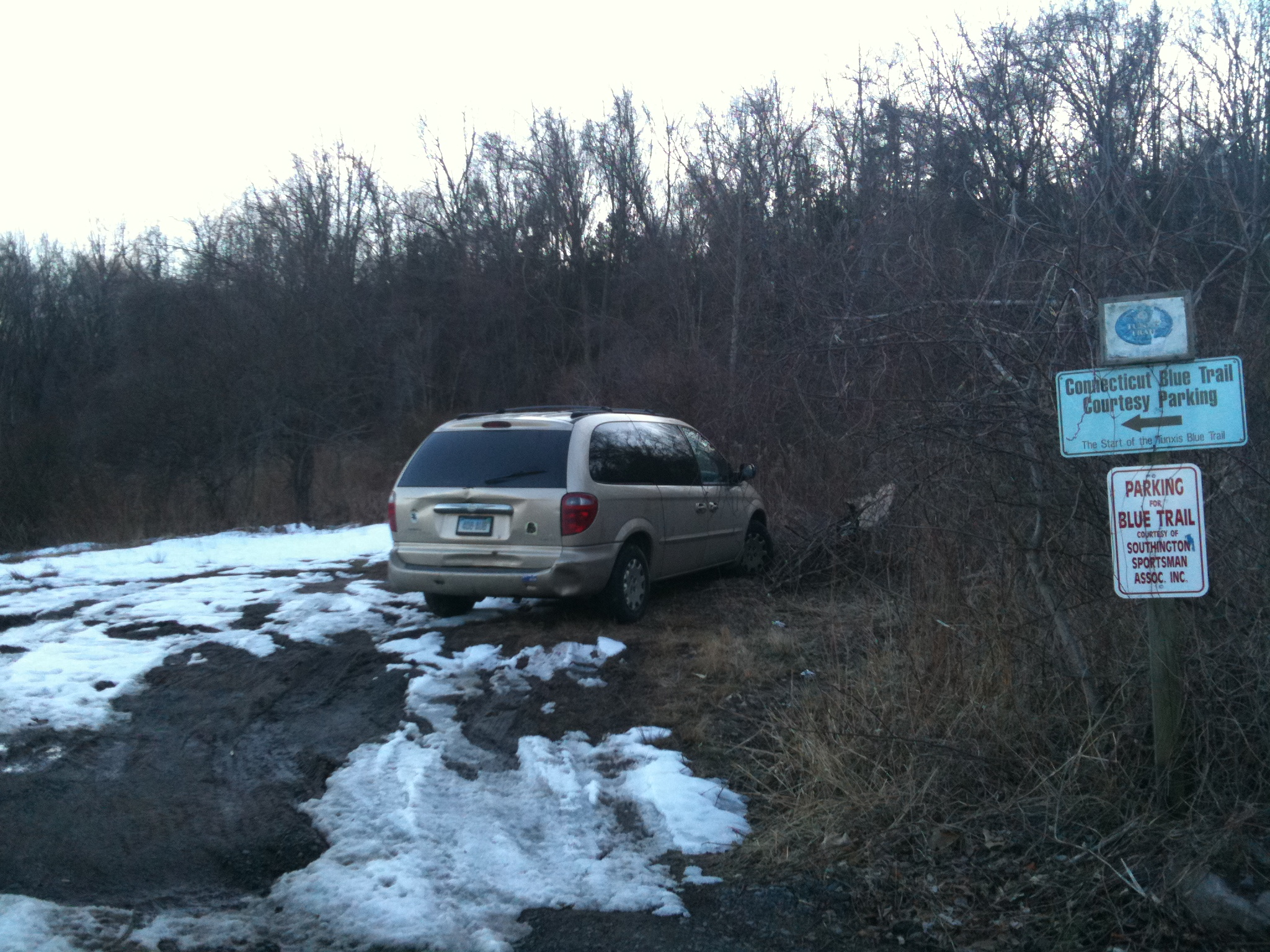
Tunxis Trail Southern Trailhead and Parking Lot

The Tunxis Trail extends from the Connecticut / Massachusetts border north to south crossing successively the municipalities of Hartland in Hartford County, Barkhamsted and New Hartford in Litchfield County, Canton and Burlington in Hartford County, Harwinton and Plymouth in Litchfield County, ending in Bristol and Southington in Hartford County with two southern side trails touching the northern New Haven County town of Wolcott.

The southern terminus of the trail is located just north of the Mount Southington ski resort at the intersection of Mount Vernon Road and Whitman Road at a courtesy parking lot provided by the Southington Sportsmen Association, in the town of Southington, Connecticut; the northern terminus is located on the Connecticut / Massachusetts state line where Connecticut's Tunxis State Forest and Massachusetts's Granville State Forest meet, part of Hartland, Connecticut, south of Granville, Massachusetts. The Metacomet Ridge (in particular central Connecticut high points such as the Hanging Hills, Ragged Mountain and Talcott Mountain, including Heublein Tower) is visible to the east from much of the Tunxis Trail.

A number of networks of shorter hiking trails (17 official "Blue-Blazed" regional trails) intersect with the Tunxis Trail in the three southern sections—in the Southington region (from Wolcott to the New Britain Reservoir and in Bristol near the Lake Compounce Amusement Park), the Burlington Region, and in Nepaug State Forest in New Hartford.

The Tunxis Trail is primarily used for hiking, backpacking, picnicking, and in the winter, snowshoeing. Portions of the trail are suitable for, and are used for, mountain biking and cross-country skiing. Site-specific activities enjoyed along the route include hunting, fishing, horseback riding, boating, bouldering, rock climbing (access), and swimming.

=== Trail route ===
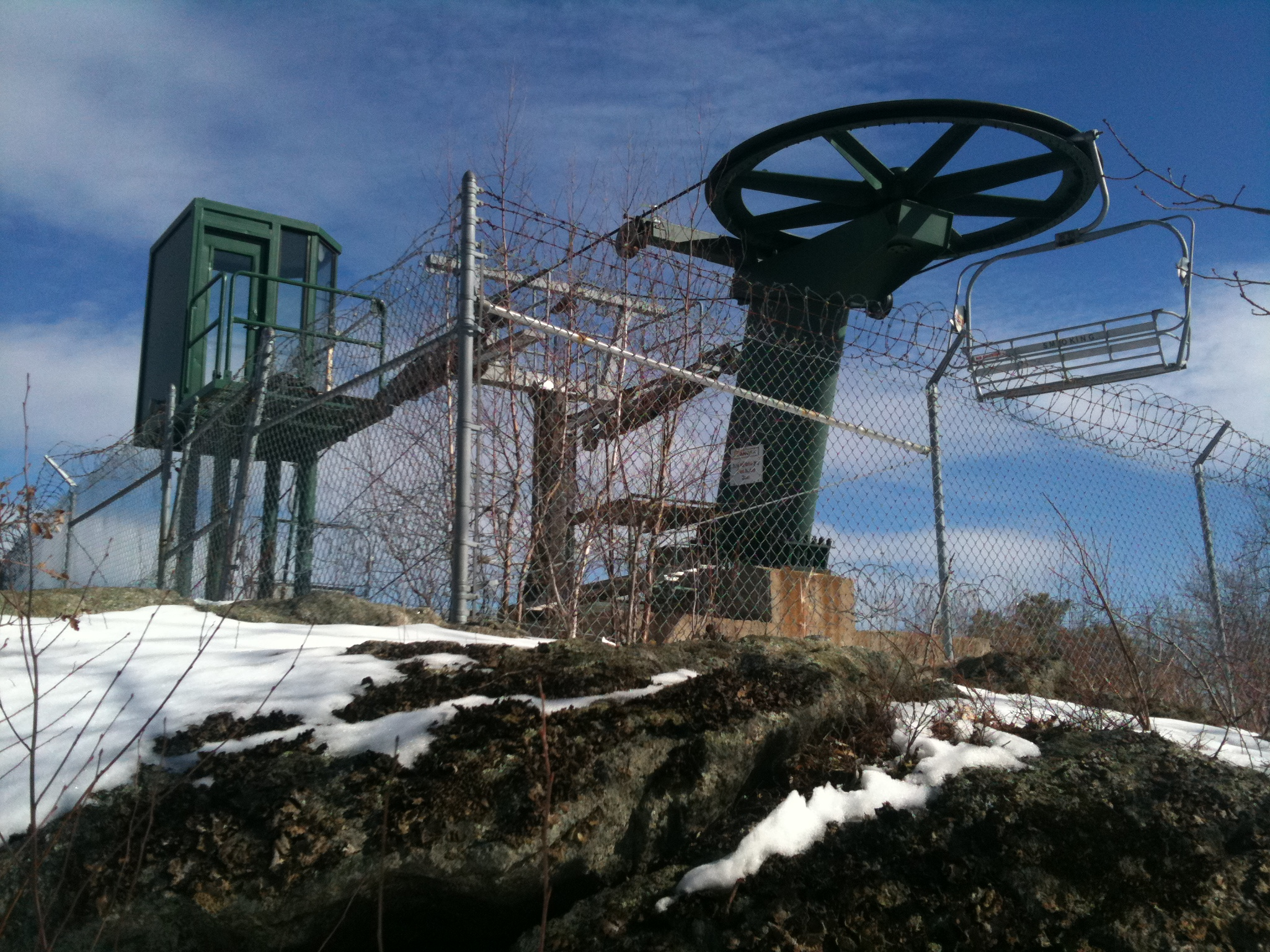
"Sky Ride" (Lake Compounce chair lift) on Southington Mountain along Tunxis Trail (2010)

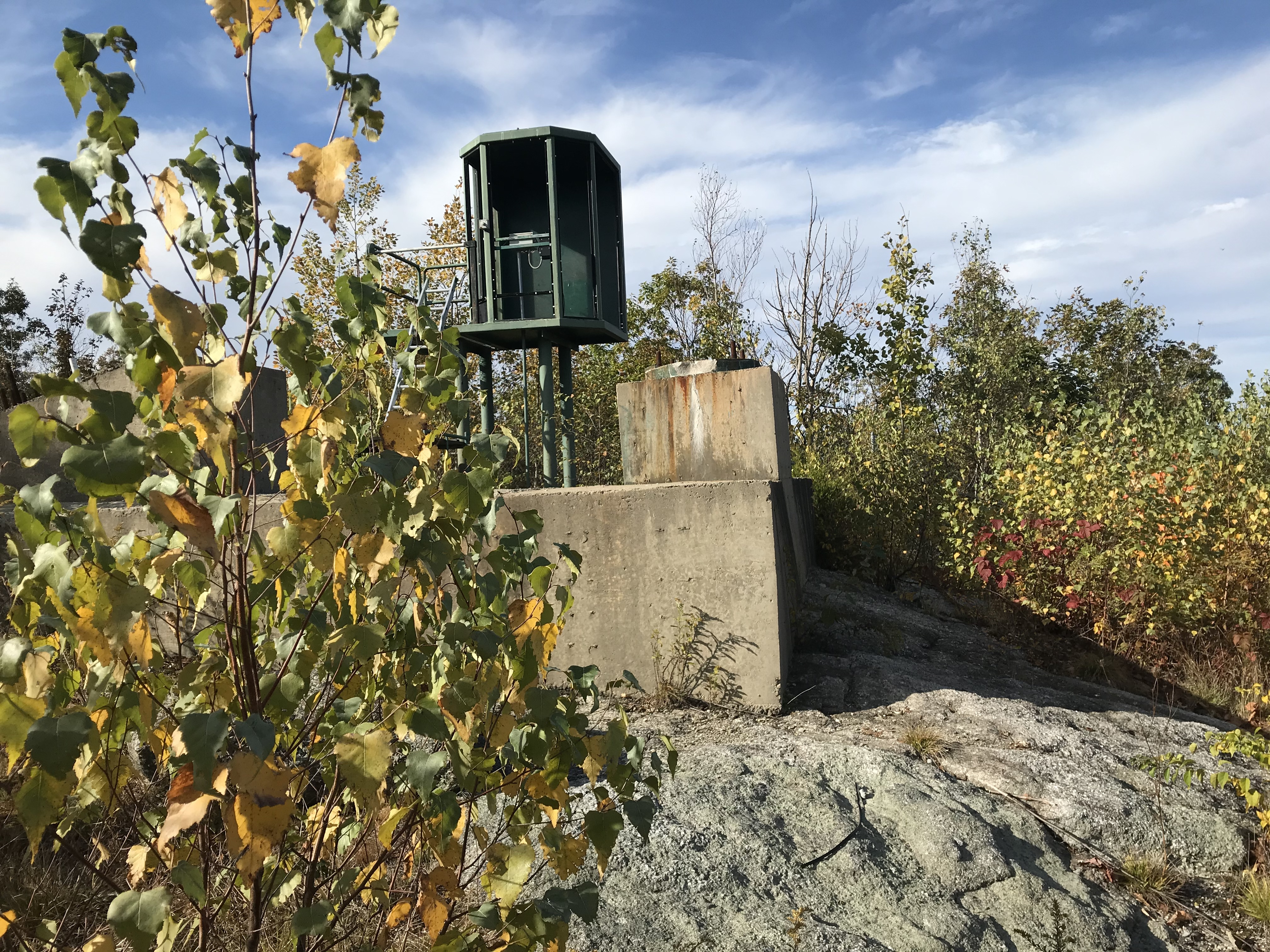
Decommissioned "Sky Ride" (Lake Compounce chair lift) on Southington Mountain along Tunxis Trail (2019)

The Tunxis Trail traverses the western ridge of the central Connecticut valley which extends from Long Island Sound to the Massachusetts/Vermont border.

This western ridge, overlooking the Connecticut River, Farmington River, and Quinnipiac River valleys, is a prominent landscape feature of western central Connecticut.

From south to north, the trail system summits or travels near by the ridges and peaks of Southington Mountain (including Libby's Lump, Peter's Lookout), Johnnycake Mountain, Taine Mountain / Perry’s Lookout, Wildcat Mountain, Ski Sundown / Ratlum Mountain, Pine Mountain, Indian Hill.

The Farmington River cuts through the trail just above Nepaug State Forest at the Satan's Kingdom Recreation Area in New Hartford.

The Tunxis Trail crosses several Connecticut state forests, land/preservation trusts, metropolitan water company properties and private property.

From south to north the trail crosses the Sessions Woods Wildlife Management Area, Nassahegon State Forest, Nepaug State Forest, Tunxis State Forest, Granville State Forest.

Views from the ledges include agrarian land, suburbs, small towns, river corridors, the eastern Berkshires and Metacomet ridgelines, and metropolitan Bristol.

=== Trail communities ===
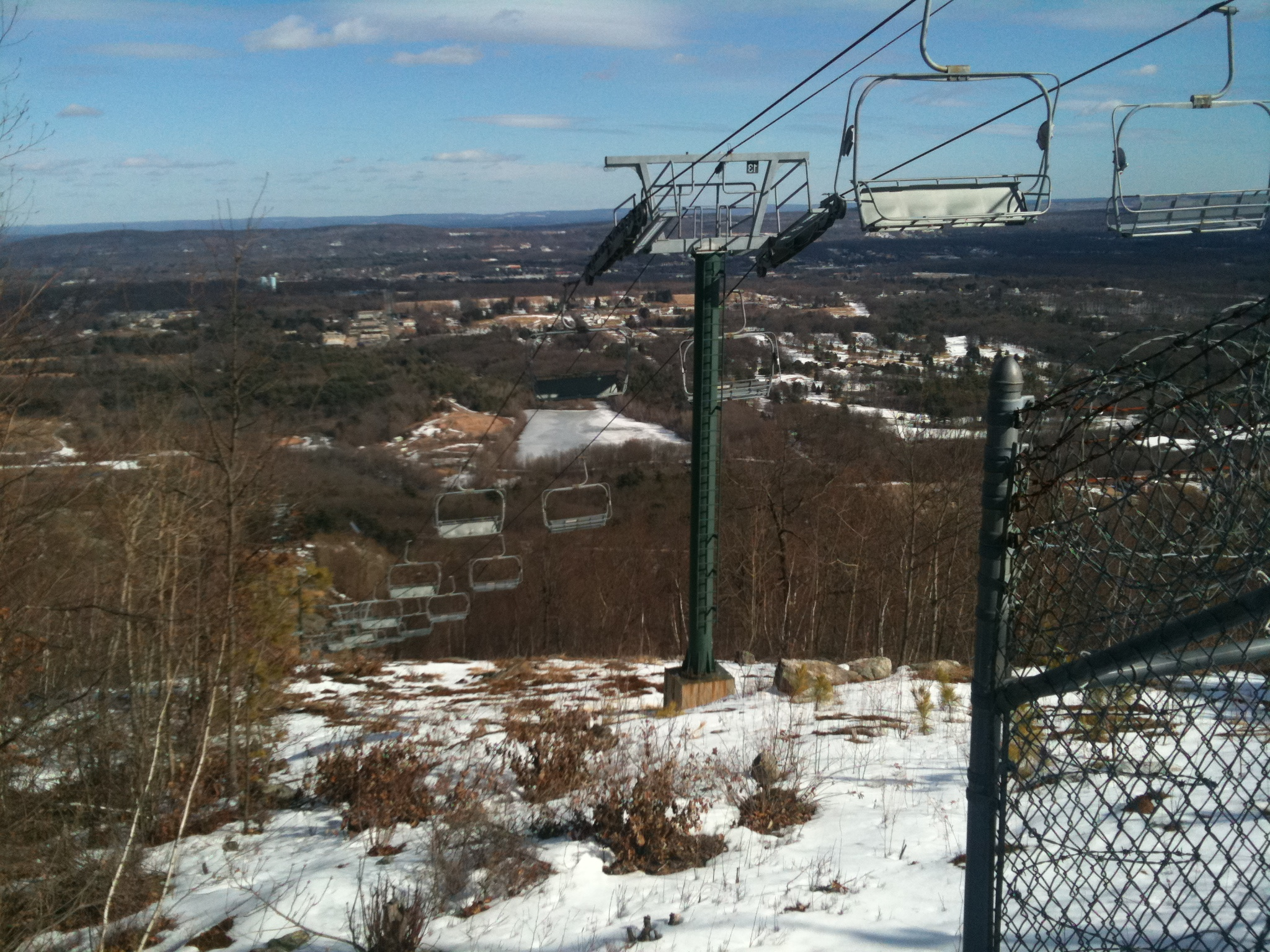
Lake Compounce SkyRide chair lifts from the Tunxis Trail Compounce Ridge side trail (2010)

The Tunxis Trail passes through land located within the following municipalities in Connecticut, from south to north: Southington, Wolcott, Bristol, Plymouth, (East Plymouth aka Terryville), Harwinton, Burlington, Canton, New Hartford, Barkhamsted, Hartland as well as Granville, Massachusetts

== Landscape, geology, and natural environment ==
The Tunxis Trail follows the western wall of the geologic formation known as the Hartford Basin.

== History and folklore ==
=== Origin and name ===
The upper Connecticut and Farmington River valleys were the lands of the Native American indigenous people called the Massaco, a sub-tribe of the Tunxis, who were affiliated with the Wappinger. The name Tunxis, a word in the Quiripi family of Eastern Algonquian languages, derives from the indigenous term Wuttunkshau for "the point where the river bends". Halfway through the course of the river, in a floodplain in the town of Farmington at the base of the Metacomet Ridge, the flow of the Farmington River changes its direction to the northeast, where it eventually joins up with the Connecticut River in Windsor.

When Europeans first arrived, the "Tunxis Sepus" territory consisted of a 165-mile square area bounded by Simsbury to the North, Wallingford to the South, to the northwest by Mohawk country, and on the east by the current towns of Windsor, Hartford and Wethersfield.

=== Historic sites ===
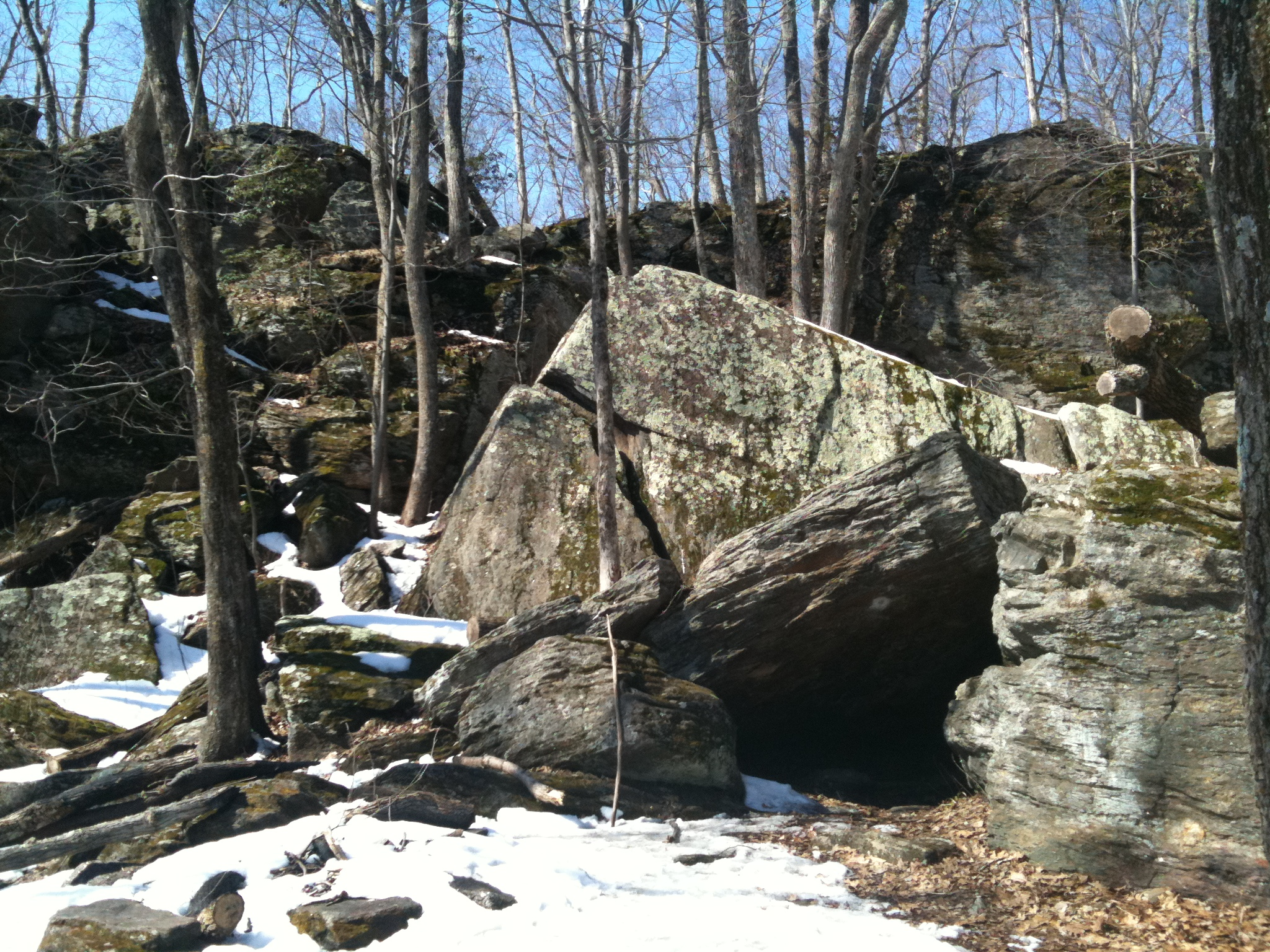
Loyalist "Tory Den" on the Tunxis Yellow Dot Trail in the Burlington Section

=== Folklore ===
There is much American Revolutionary war history associated with the Blue-Blazed White Dot Trail in Terryille (a village of Plymouth) and Harwinton.

• The locations of several British "loyalist" families are near the southern terminus of the White Dot Trail in Terryville (Plymouth) and Harwinton, such as the former homestead of Stephen Graves.

• The Tory Den, a boulder cave located to the west of the "Miles of Ledges" on the border of Terryville (Plymouth) and Burlington, was a hiding place for Loyalists during the American Revolution.

There are many "satanic" references in place names along the Tunxis Trail, usually dating back to colonial American times.

• The "Devil's Kitchen" is a box canyon formation through which the Blue-Blazed Orange Dot Trail passes in Burlington.

• "Satan's Kingdom", north of Nepaug State Forest, was considered a territory of rogues and unsavory elements during the colonial American era. It is now noteworthy as a launching area for a commercial white-water tubing concession on the Farmington River.

• The Ski Sundown ski area was known as Satan's Ridge Ski Area when it first opened in 1963 until it was sold in 1969.

== Hiking the trail ==
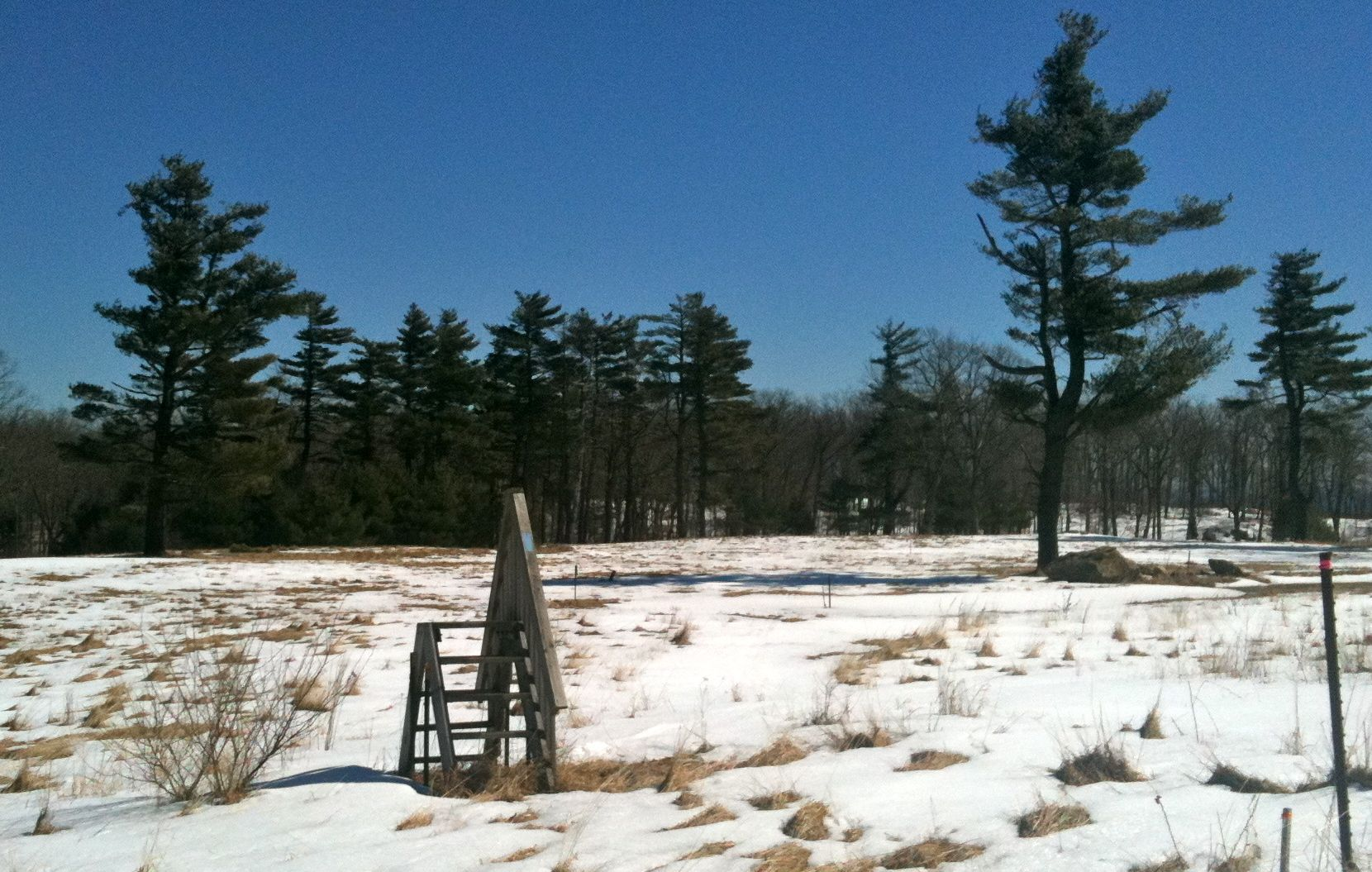
A stile in the middle of a snow-covered fallow field on Johnnycake Mountain marks the Tunxis White Dot Trail after the farm fences are gone.

The mainline Tunxis trail is blazed with blue rectangles. It is regularly maintained, and is considered easy hiking, with sections of rugged and moderately difficult hiking. However the "Mile of Ledges" in Burlington requires an amount of rock climbing and the northernmost "wilderness" twenty miles contains both higher elevation and changes in elevation. The Tunxis Trail is generally close to public roads. However, in the Burlington areas many of the roads are unpaved and the northernmost twenty miles are much more remote and even farther from paved roads. There are camping facilities along the northern portions of the trail in the Nepaug and Tunxis State Forests. Camping is generally prohibited in the southern sections (Southington and Burlington). Trail descriptions are available from a number of commercial and non-commercial sources, and a complete guidebook is published by the Connecticut Forest and Park Association

The mainline trail consists roughly of four unbroken sections: Southington (Southington, Wolcott and Bristol), Burlington (Plymouth, Harwinton, Burlington), Nepaug (Burlington, New Hartford) and the northern twenty miles north of route 44 (New Hartford, Canton, Barkhamsted and Hartland).

Weather along the route is typical of the region. Conditions on exposed ridge tops and summits may be harsher during cold or stormy weather. Lightning is a hazard on exposed summits and ledges during thunderstorms. Snow is common in the winter and may necessitate the use of snowshoes. Ice can form on exposed ledges and summits, making hiking dangerous without special equipment.

Extensive flooding in ponds, puddles and streams may occur in the late winter or early spring, overflowing into the trail and causing very muddy conditions. In this case fairly high waterproof boots are recommended.

Hazards of the trail during warmer weather include snakes, biting insects, and deer ticks, which are known to carry Lyme disease.

The southern sections of trail often run very close to suburban homes, streets, and businesses, and may contain ruts from ATVs. The middle sections (Burlington, Nepaug) contain many forest roads, dirt roads and paved road walks, and occasionally elements of human presence along the trail are on display, such as cairns, ornaments hung on tree branches, and perfectly spaced pine tree forests resulting from forest management experiments.

Much of the trail is adjacent to, or is on lands where hunting and the use of firearms are permitted. Wearing bright orange clothing during the hunting season (Fall through December) is recommended.

== Conservation and maintenance of the trail corridor ==
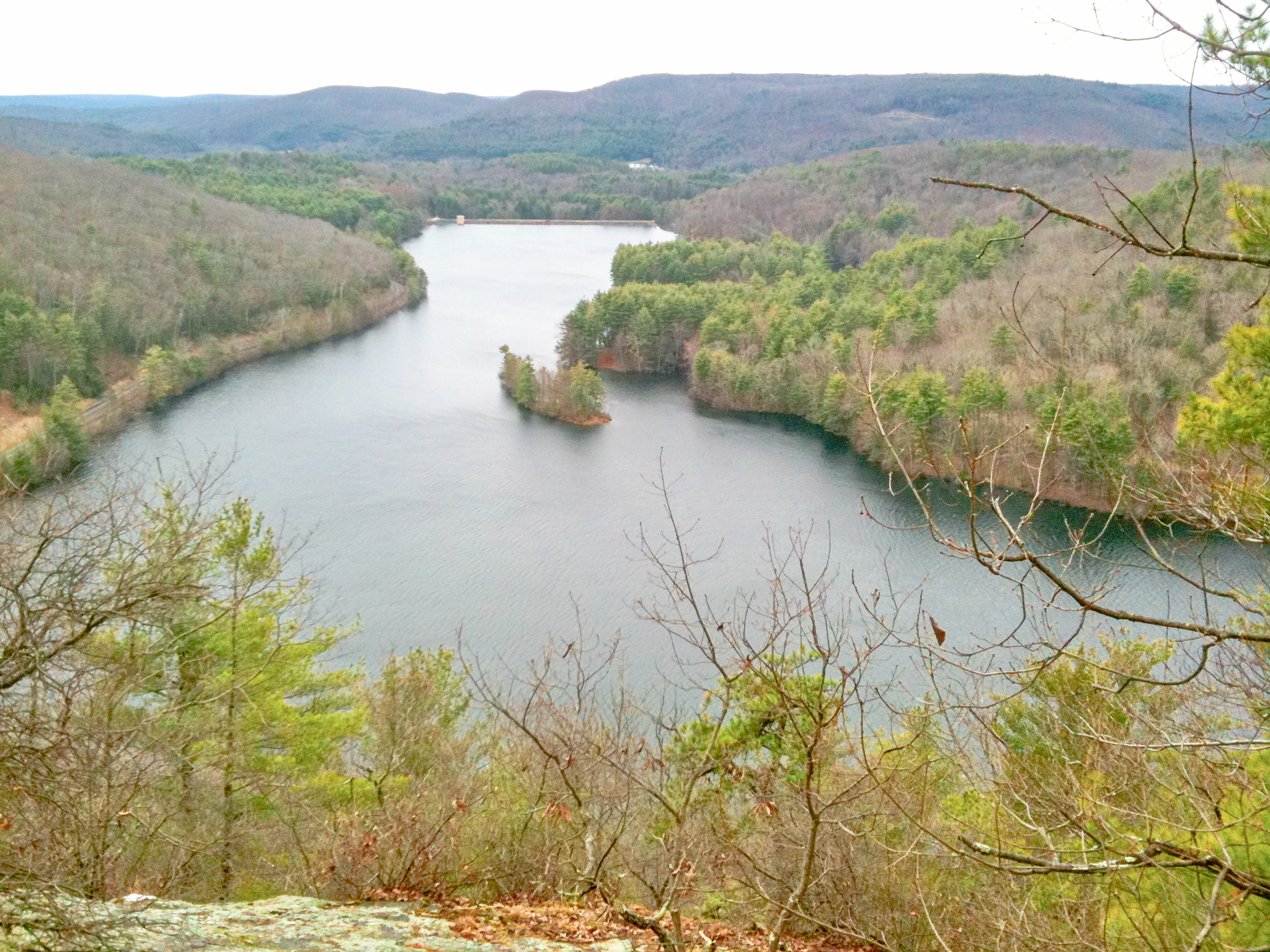
Lake Mcdonough in Barkhamsted, Connecticut, viewed from an overlook spur of the Tunxis Trail Northern Section

== See also ==
- Blue-Blazed Trails
- Mattatuck Trail
- Metacomet Ridge
- Metacomet-Monadnock Trail
- Metacomet Trail
