= Burlington, Connecticut =

- Town
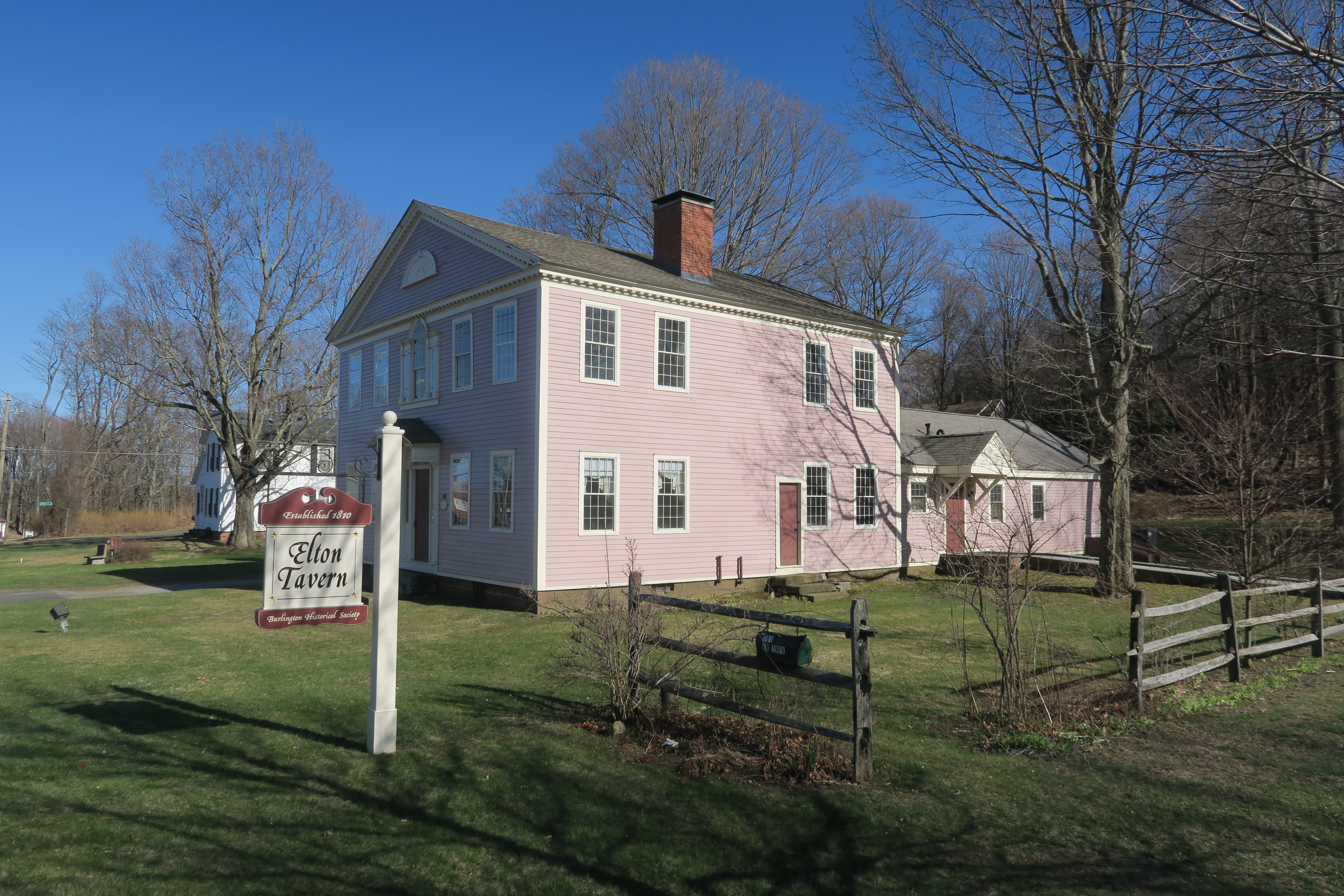
- Brown Tavern

- Seal
- Motto: "A Town Where Community Counts"
- Interactive map of Burlington, Connecticut
- Coordinates: 41°45′31″N 72°57′28″W
- Country: United States
- U.S. state: Connecticut
- County: Hartford
- Region: Northwest Hills
- Incorporated: 1806
- Hamlets: Burlington; Covey Corners; Lake Garda; Whigville

Government
  - Type: Selectman-town meeting
  - First Selectman: Douglas Thompson (R)
  - Selectmen: James A. Chard (R); David Goshdigian (D); Joshua Y. Plourde (I); Thomas E. Zabel (D)

Area
  - Total: 30.4 sq mi (78.8 km^{2})
  - Land: 29.7 sq mi (77.0 km^{2})
  - Water: 0.66 sq mi (1.7 km^{2})
- Elevation: 817 ft (249 m)

Population (2020)
  - Total: 9,519
  - Density: 320.2/sq mi (123.6/km^{2})
- Time zone: UTC-5 (EST)
  - Summer (DST): UTC-4 (EDT)
- ZIP code: 06013
- Area codes: 860/959
- FIPS code: 09-10100
- GNIS feature ID: 0213401
- Website: www.burlingtonct.gov

Burlington is a town in Hartford County, Connecticut, United States. Situated at the foot of the Berkshires and bordering the Farmington River, it is a scenic hill town, rural in nature, located 20 miles (32 km) west of Hartford. Incorporated in 1806, the population was 9,519 at the 2020 census. The town is part of the Northwest Hills Planning Region.

== History ==
The area that includes present-day Burlington was originally inhabited by the Tunxis tribe.

The town was once part of larger Farmington Plantation. In 1785, it split away and became a part of the town of Bristol. On June 16, 1806, Burlington became a town in its own right. Cottage industries flourished in the early decades of the town, including multiple clock-making operations. Upon the completion of the Farmington Canal in 1829, many industries ceased operations or moved to neighboring towns.

In 1968, the remainder of the New Haven and Northampton Railroad branch that originally went to New Hartford and passed through Burlington was abandoned due to The Collins Company shutting down nearby factory operations in 1966. The existing railway has since been converted into a multi-use paved rail trail that is a part of the New Haven and Northampton Canal Greenway.

== Geography ==
According to the United States Census Bureau, the town has a total area of 30.4 square miles (78.8 km^{2}), of which 29.7 square miles (77.0 km^{2}) is land and 0.66 square miles (1.7 km^{2}), or 2.19%, is water. Almost half of the land in the town is owned by three public water supply companies and the State of Connecticut.

Burlington is home to the State of Connecticut Fish Hatchery, Nassahegon State Forest, the Nepaug Reservoir, and Sessions Woods Wildlife Management Area. Johnnycake Mountain is the highest point in the town at 1,165 ft (355 m). The Tunxis Trail runs through the town north to south.

Burlington presently borders the municipalities of Avon, Bristol, Canton, Farmington, Harwinton, New Hartford, and Plymouth.

=== Climate ===
According to the Köppen Climate Classification system, Burlington has a warm-summer humid continental climate, abbreviated "Dfb" on climate maps. The hottest temperature recorded in Burlington was 100 °F (37.8 °C) on July 21–22, 1991, July 23, 2011, and June 24, 2025, while the coldest temperature recorded was −25 °F (−31.7 °C) on February 14, 2016.

Climate data for Burlington, Connecticut, 1991–2020 normals, extremes 1961–present
Month	Jan	Feb	Mar	Apr	May	Jun	Jul	Aug	Sep	Oct	Nov	Dec	Year
Record high °F (°C)	72 (22)	80 (27)	83 (28)	94 (34)	95 (35)	100 (38)	100 (38)	98 (37)	97 (36)	89 (32)	83 (28)	75 (24)	100 (38)
Mean maximum °F (°C)	57.3 (14.1)	58.9 (14.9)	67.0 (19.4)	82.3 (27.9)	88.8 (31.6)	91.7 (33.2)	93.5 (34.2)	91.5 (33.1)	88.2 (31.2)	79.6 (26.4)	70.6 (21.4)	60.5 (15.8)	95.5 (35.3)
Mean daily maximum °F (°C)	36.3 (2.4)	39.1 (3.9)	46.6 (8.1)	59.5 (15.3)	70.4 (21.3)	78.5 (25.8)	83.7 (28.7)	82.0 (27.8)	75.3 (24.1)	63.3 (17.4)	52.1 (11.2)	41.4 (5.2)	60.7 (15.9)
Daily mean °F (°C)	26.6 (−3.0)	28.7 (−1.8)	36.3 (2.4)	47.8 (8.8)	58.6 (14.8)	67.6 (19.8)	72.9 (22.7)	71.1 (21.7)	63.9 (17.7)	52.0 (11.1)	42.2 (5.7)	32.7 (0.4)	50.0 (10.0)
Mean daily minimum °F (°C)	17.0 (−8.3)	18.3 (−7.6)	25.9 (−3.4)	36.1 (2.3)	46.8 (8.2)	56.6 (13.7)	62.1 (16.7)	60.2 (15.7)	52.5 (11.4)	40.8 (4.9)	32.2 (0.1)	24.0 (−4.4)	39.4 (4.1)
Mean minimum °F (°C)	−1.1 (−18.4)	0.0 (−17.8)	8.3 (−13.2)	24.3 (−4.3)	33.8 (1.0)	43.3 (6.3)	50.7 (10.4)	49.6 (9.8)	38.5 (3.6)	27.1 (−2.7)	17.6 (−8.0)	7.0 (−13.9)	−4.6 (−20.3)
Record low °F (°C)	−18 (−28)	−25 (−32)	−6 (−21)	13 (−11)	22 (−6)	27 (−3)	37 (3)	35 (2)	24 (−4)	16 (−9)	1 (−17)	−13 (−25)	−25 (−32)
Average precipitation inches (mm)	3.65 (93)	3.36 (85)	4.22 (107)	4.28 (109)	4.19 (106)	4.83 (123)	4.44 (113)	5.14 (131)	5.01 (127)	5.66 (144)	3.87 (98)	4.81 (122)	53.46 (1,358)
Average snowfall inches (cm)	11.1 (28)	11.8 (30)	5.5 (14)	0.5 (1.3)	0.0 (0.0)	0.0 (0.0)	0.0 (0.0)	0.0 (0.0)	0.0 (0.0)	0.6 (1.5)	0.8 (2.0)	8.3 (21)	38.6 (97.8)
Average precipitation days (≥ 0.01 in)	10.3	8.8	10.4	11.0	12.0	11.0	10.7	9.9	8.9	10.3	8.9	10.8	123.0
Average snowy days (≥ 0.1 in)	3.7	2.9	1.6	0.3	0.0	0.0	0.0	0.0	0.0	0.1	0.2	2.0	10.8
Source 1: NOAA
Source 2: National Weather Service

== Demographics ==
Historical population
Census	Pop.	Note	%±
1820	1,360		—
1850	1,161		—
1860	1,031		−11.2%
1870	1,319		27.9%
1880	1,224		−7.2%
1890	1,302		6.4%
1900	1,218		−6.5%
1910	1,319		8.3%
1920	1,109		−15.9%
1930	1,082		−2.4%
1940	1,246		15.2%
1950	1,846		48.2%
1960	2,790		51.1%
1970	4,070		45.9%
1980	5,660		39.1%
1990	7,026		24.1%
2000	8,190		16.6%
2010	9,301		13.6%
2020	9,519		2.3%
U.S. Decennial Census

As of the census of 2010, there were 9,326 people, 3,303 households, and 2,691 families residing in the town. The racial makeup of the town was 96.5% White, 0.6% African American, 0.0% Native American, 1.5% Asian, 0.0% Pacific Islander, 0.5% from other races, and 0.9% from two or more races. Hispanic or Latino people of any race were 2.6% of the population.

There were 3,303 households, out of which 40.7% had children under the age of 18 living with them, 71.4% were married couples living together, 6.5% had a female householder with no husband present, and 14.5% were non-families. 18.5% of all households were made up of individuals, and 5.5% had someone living alone who was 65 years of age or older. The average household size was 2.82 and the average family size was 3.13.

In the town, the population was spread out, with 29.0% under the age of 19, 6.4% from 20 to 29, 10.2% from 30 to 39, 20.6% from 40 to 49, 23.7% from 50 to 64, and 5.4% who were 65 years of age or older. The median age was 42.5 years.

Economic figures for the town include a median income for a household at $105,250, and the median income for a family at $114,544. About 2.3% of families have incomes under $15,000/year and 11.9% of families have incomes over $200,000/year.

== Economy ==
Burlington has a central business district which primarily runs along Spielman Highway (Route 4). In hopes of further developing the central business district, a Library Lane Advisory Commission was formed in June 2021 to help provide concepts for the use of the property. The Library Lane Advisory Commission presented a final report in January 2022 to the Board of Selectmen that focused on types of development, resident survey results, architecture and design, infrastructure improvements, and traffic studies.

== Parks and recreation ==
Burlington has four recreation facilities with the newest being Johnnycake Mountain Park that was established in 2024. The other recreation facilities include Foote Road Recreation Complex, Malerbo Recreation Complex, and Nassahegan Recreation Complex which consist of playgrounds, soccer fields, lacrosse fields, baseball fields, and softball fields.

== Sports ==
Burlington has annual road and trail races road that pass through the community, such as the Burlington to Collinsville Classic 10K that begins at Burlington's Lake Garda Elementary School and runs along the Farmington River on the New Haven and Northampton Canal Greenway and finishing in Collinsville.

The Tunxis Trail Races, which are organized by the Burlington Land Trust throughout the year, typically include 5K, 8K, 30K, and 60K distances that pass through notable landmarks.

== Government and politics ==
Voter registration and party enrollment as of October 31, 2024
Party	Active voters	Inactive voters	Total voters	Percentage
Republican	2,142	97	2,239	29.40%
Democratic	1,872	75	1,947	25.56%
Unaffiliated	3,085	189	3,274	42.98%
Minor parties	142	16	158	2.07%
Total	7,241	377	7,618	100%

Burlington town vote by party in presidential elections
Year	Democratic	Republican	Third Parties
2024	48.01% 2,782	50.37% 2,919	1.62% 94
2020	49.72% 3,099	48.68% 3,034	1.60% 100
2016	43.68% 2,352	51.49% 2,773	4.83% 260
2012	46.23% 2,357	52.63% 2,683	1.14% 58
2008	52.08% 2,716	46.14% 2,406	1.78% 93
2004	48.84% 2,501	49.58% 2,539	1.58% 81
2000	49.26% 2,137	45.30% 1,965	5.44% 236
1996	45.51% 1,747	40.32% 1,548	14.17% 544
1992	37.03% 1,511	35.73% 1,458	27.25% 1,112
1988	44.07% 1,413	54.96% 1,762	0.97% 31
1984	33.84% 994	65.99% 1,938	0.17% 5
1980	35.81% 953	47.69% 1,269	16.50% 439
1976	45.08% 972	54.55% 1,176	0.37% 8
1972	38.53% 722	60.09% 1,126	1.39% 26
1968	43.81% 648	46.65% 690	9.54% 141
1964	66.26% 860	33.74% 438	0.00% 0
1960	48.28% 644	51.72% 690	0.00% 0
1956	30.35% 305	69.65% 700	0.00% 0

== Education ==
In 1779, the Congregational Church laid out nine school districts, each with its own schoolhouse. In 1948, Burlington Consolidated School opened to replace these schoolhouses. By 1962, the Regional School District #10 was established to serve Burlington and Harwinton.

The four current schools within the district are;

- Lake Garda School (Pre-K to Grade 4) - Opened in 1965
- Harwinton Consolidated School (Pre-K to Grade 4) - Opened in 1948
- Har-Bur Middle School (Grade 5 to Grade 8) - Opened in 1973
- Lewis S. Mills High School (Grade 9 to Grade 12) - Opened in 1961

The Burlington Consolidated School is currently used as Town Hall by Burlington after it was closed 1965.

== Infrastructure ==
=== Airports ===
Johnnycake Mountain Meadows Airfield (22B) was an airport in the northwestern corner of Burlington and was sometimes referenced as "Mountain Meadows". The airport had a 2,400 ft northwest to southwest runway with a flight school and fuel depot that closed on April 1, 2004 after the owner no longer wanted an airport on his property.

On September 2, 2023, a single-engine plane made an emergency landing in the cornfield slightly south of the airport with no casualties.

=== Emergency services ===
The Burlington Volunteer Fire Department (BVFD) provides fire, rescue and emergency medical services to Burlington. The fire department operates four stations;

- Station 1 - Headquarters - 719 George Washington Turnpike
- Station 2 - Chippens Hill - 120 West Chippens Hill Road
- Station 3 - Whigville - 354 Jerome Avenue
- Station 4 - Lake Garda - 87 Monce Road

== Notable locations ==
- Brown Tavern (also referred to as Elton Tavern)
- Hart's Corner Historic District
- Hitchcock-Schwarzmann Mill
- John Wiard House
- Sessions Woods Wildlife Management Area
- Seventh Day Baptist Cemetery (also referred to as Green Lady Cemetery)
- Treadwell House

== Notable people ==
- Romeo Elton (1790-1870), academic and author
- Samuel Griswold (1790–1867), industrialist born in Burlington
- Leonidas Lent Hamline (1797–1865), Methodist Episcopal bishop and founder of Hamline University; born in Burlington
- Heman Humphrey (1779-1861), author and clergyman, 2nd President of Amherst College; raised in Burlington
- Bernard Moses (1846-1931), academic and author
- Silas Brooks (1824-1906), early American balloonist raised in Burlington
