= Nassahegon State Forest =

State forest in Connecticut, United States

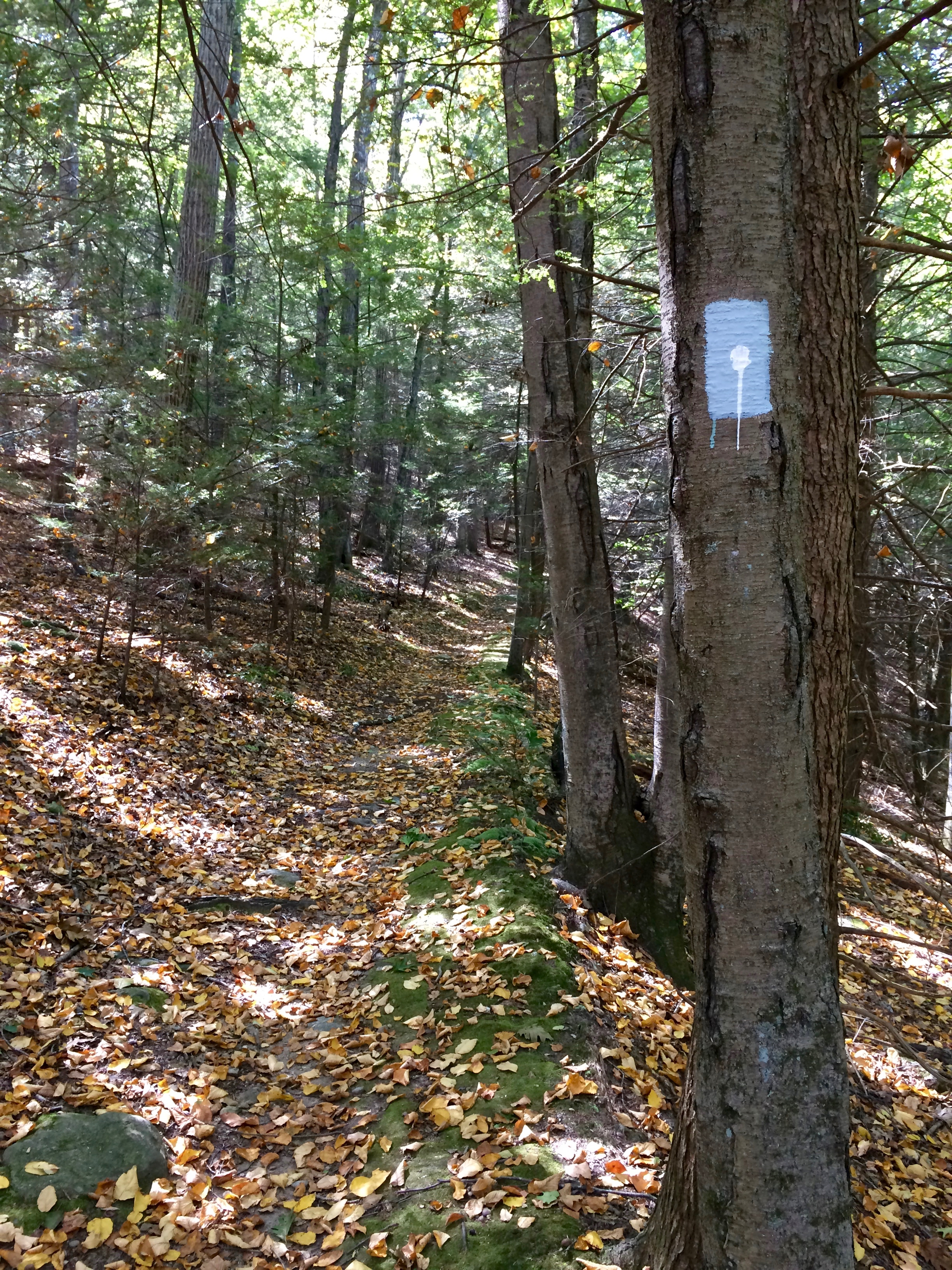
- "White-dot" Blue-Blazed Tunxis Trail near Bradley Brook and Connecticut Route 4

- Location within Connecticut Location within the United States
- Location: Burlington, Connecticut, United States
- Coordinates: 41°45′17″N 72°56′25″W
- Area: 1,352 acres (547 ha)
- Elevation: 741 ft (226 m)
- Established: 1926
- Administrator: Connecticut Department of Energy and Environmental Protection
- Website: Nassahegon State Forest

Nassahegon State Forest is a Connecticut state forest occupying 1,352 acres (547 ha) in the town of Burlington. The forest is managed for forestry and recreational purposes and is operated by the Connecticut Department of Energy and Environmental Protection.

== Features and activities ==
The state's Burlington Trout Hatchery is located on Belden Road. Opened in 1923, the hatchery raises brown trout and rainbow trout that are distributed into state lakes, ponds, rivers and streams with public access. The facility includes a building for egg incubation, fish pools and ponds, and a short nature trail. The hatchery is open free to the public on a daily basis.

The forest is crossed by the Blue-Blazed Trails system and offers opportunities for hunting, hiking, and mountain biking on approved mountain biking trails.
