= List of cemeteries in Connecticut =

This list of cemeteries in Connecticut includes currently operating, historical (closed for new interments), and defunct (graves abandoned or removed) cemeteries, columbaria, and mausolea which are historical and/or notable. It does not include pet cemeteries.

== Fairfield County ==
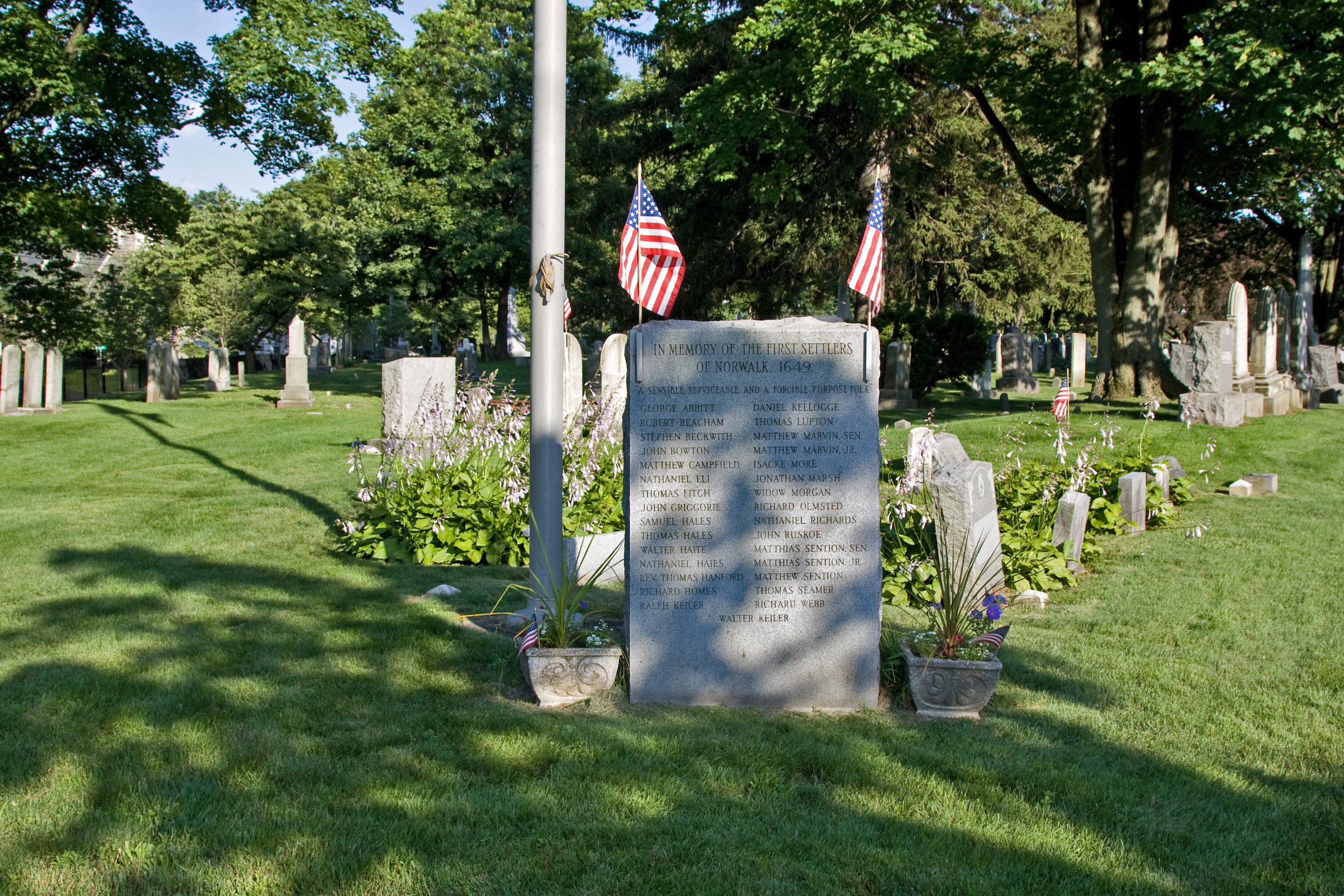
East Norwalk Historical Cemetery, dedication to the first settlers, Norwalk, Fairfield County

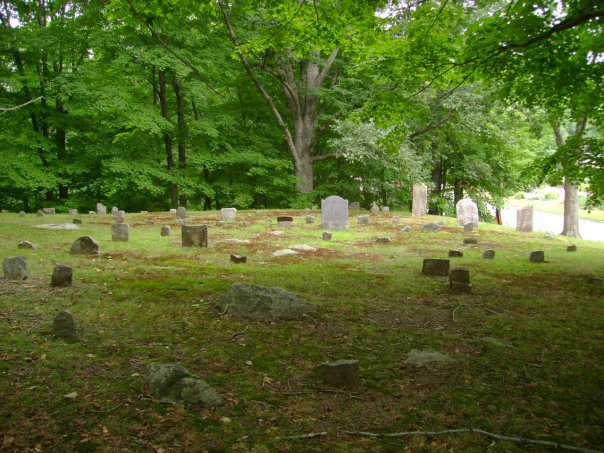
Gregory's Four Corners Burial Ground in Trumbull, Fairfield County

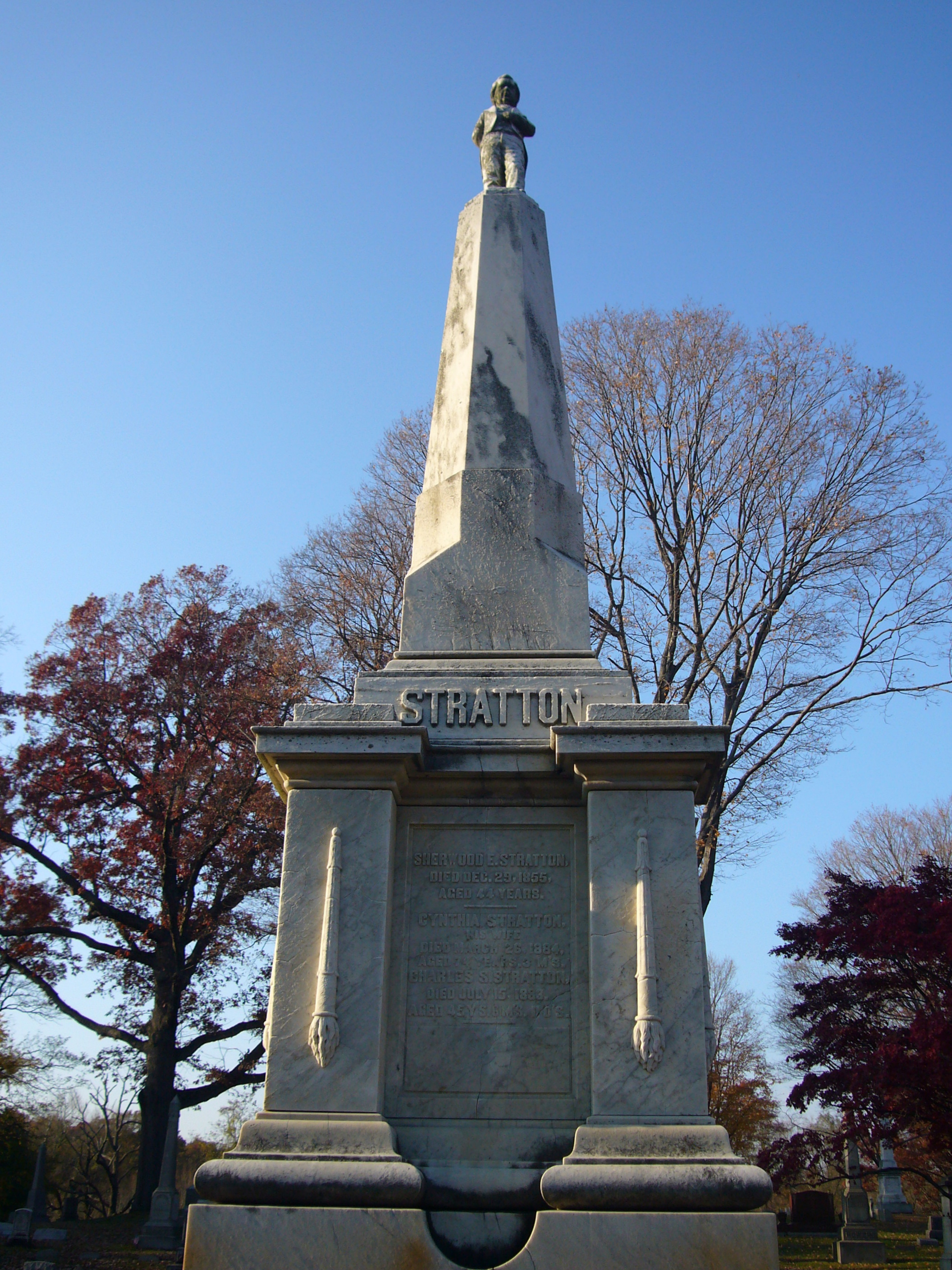
Mountain Grove Cemetery in Bridgeport, Fairfield County; General Tom Thumb's gravestone

- Adath Israel Cemetery, Fairfield
- Adath Yeshuren Cemetery, Fairfield
- Agudath Shalom Cemetery, Stamford
- B’nai Israel Cemetery, Fairfield
- B’nai Israel Cemetery, Danbury
- B’nai Israel Cemetery, Monroe
- B’nai Israel Cemetery, Shelton
- Baptist Cemetery, Danbury
- The Byram Cemetery, Greenwich
- Center Cemetery, Bethel
- Central Cemetery, Brookfield
- Children of Israel (Jewish) Cemetery, Danbury
- Christian Church Cemetery, Danbury
- Come's Cemetery, Danbury
- Congregational Church Cemetery, Bethel
- East Cemetery, Fairfield
- East Norwalk Historical Cemetery, Norwalk
- Elmwood Cemetery, Bethel
- Fairfield Memorial Park, Stamford
- Fairlawn Cemetery, Ridgefield, Connecticut
- Gallows Hill Cemetery, Brookfield
- Great Plain Cemetery, Danbury
- Gregory's Four Corners Burial Ground, Trumbull
- Hurlbutt Cemetery, Ridgefield, Connecticut
- Independent Hebrew Cemetery, Norwalk
- Kenosia or Lake Cemetery, Danbury
- Laurel Hill Cemetery, Brookfield
- Lounsbury-Rockwell Cemetery, Ridgefield, Connecticut
- Long Ridge Union Cemetery, Stamford
- Lower Starr's Plain Cemetery, Danbury
- Loyalty Cemetery, Fairfield
- Lutheran Cemetery, Danbury
- Mapleshade Cemetery, Ridgefield, Connecticut
- Memorial Garden of The Unitarian Church, Westport
- Mill Hill Burying Ground, Norwalk
- Mill Plain Cemetery, Danbury
- Miry Brook Cemetery, Danbury
- Mountain Grove Cemetery, Bridgeport
- New Catholic Cemetery, Danbury
- North Main Street Cemetery, Danbury
- Oak Lawn Cemetery, Fairfield
- Old Long Ridge Cemetery, Danbury
- Old Westville Cemetery, Danbury
- Pembroke Cemetery, Danbury
- Pine Island Cemetery, Norwalk
- Rodeph Sholom Cemetery, Fairfield
- Riverside Cemetery, Norwalk
- Roxbury Cemetery, Stamford
- Scott’s or Gage’s Cemetery, Ridgefield, Connecticut
- St. Augustine Cemetery, Bridgeport
- St. James Cemetery, Bridgeport
- St. James Cemetery, Danbury
- St. John's Cemetery, Norwalk
- St. Mary's Cemetery, Bethel
- St. Mary's Cemetery, Norwalk
- St. Mary's Church Cemetery, Bethel
- St. Paul's On the Green Cemetery, Norwalk
- St. Playton'st Cemetery, Danbury
- St. Rose Cemetery, Newtown
- Stepney Cemetery, Monroe
- Stony Hill Cemetery, Bethel
- Titicus Cemetery, Ridgefield, Connecticut
- Cemetery, Redding
- Union Cemetery, Easton
- Union Cemetery, Norwalk
- Willowbrook Cemetery, Westport
- Wolfpits Cemetery, Bethel
- Wooster Street Cemetery, Danbury

== Hartford County ==
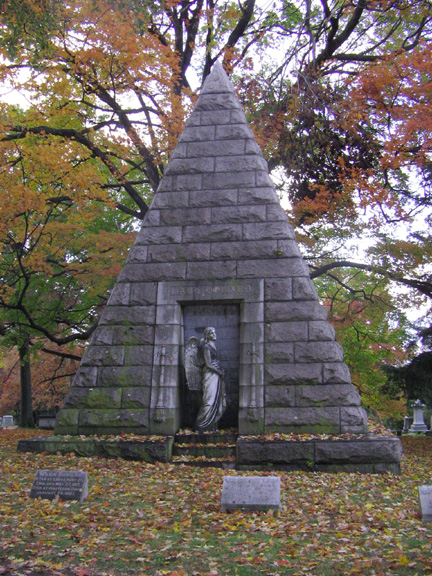
Cedar Hill Cemetery in Hartford, Hartford County; the Mark and Angeline Lee Howard pyramid

- Ancient Burying Ground, Hartford
- Blue Hills Cemetery, Berlin
- Bridge Cemetery, Berlin
- Buckland Cemetery, Manchester
- Canton Center Cemetery, Canton
- Canton Street Cemetery, Canton
- Cedar Hill Cemetery, Hartford
- Center Street Cemetery, Burlington
- Century Cemetery, Marlborough
- Dyer Cemetery, Canton
- East Cemetery, Manchester
- Enfield Street Cemetery, Enfield
- Evergreen Cemetery, Avon
- Fairview Cemetery, West Hartford
  Fairview Cemetery chapel/office, West Hartford, Hartford County
- Glastonbury Green Cemetery, Glastonbury
- Green Cemetery, Glastonbury
- Greenwood Cemetery, Avon
- Maple Hill Cemetery, Berlin
- Memento Mori Cemetery, Farmington
  Entrance to Memento Mori Cemetery in Farmington, Hartford County
- North Canton Cemetery, Canton
- Old Eastbury Cemetery, Glastonbury
- Old Wethersfield Village Cemetery, Wethersfield
- Seventh Day Baptist Cemetery, Burlington
- South Burying Ground, Kensington, Berlin
- St. Mary's Cemetery, Avon
- St. Patrick's Cemetery, Canton
- Village Cemetery, Canton
- West Cemetery, Manchester
- West Lane Cemetery, Berlin

== Litchfield County ==
- Abbey of Regina Laudis Cemetery, Bethlehem
- Ashley Falls Cemetery, North Canaan
- Canaan Valley Cemetery, North Canaan
- East Cemetery, Litchfield
- Hillside Cemetery, North Canaan
- Judea Cemetery, Washington
- Lower Cemetery, North Canaan
- New Milford Center Cemetery, New Milford
- Old North Road Burying Ground, (also known as Winchester Cemetery), Winsted
- Roxbury Center Cemetery, Roxbury
- Sons of Jacob Cemetery, Torrington
- South Cemetery, Colebrook
- St. Joseph's Cemetery, North Canaan
- Townhill Cemetery, New Hartford
- West Cemetery, Litchfield

== Middlesex County ==
- Ackley Cemetery, East Haddam
- Bashan Lake Cemetery, East Haddam
- Connecticut State Veterans Cemetery, Middletown
- Cove Cemetery, Hadlyme North Historic District, East Haddam
- Cypress Cemetery, Old Saybrook
- Foxtown Cemetery, East Haddam
- Hog Hill Cemetery, East Hampton
- Indian Hill Cemetery, Middletown
- Minor Cemetery, Middletown
- Millington Cemetery, East Haddam
- Moodus Cemetery, East Haddam
- Mortimer Cemetery, Middletown
- Old Cemetery, Portland
- Old Cove Cemetery, East Haddam
- Riverside Cemetery, Middletown
- Riverside Cemetery, Old Saybrook
- River View Cemetery, East Haddam
- Swedish Cemetery, Portland
- Tater Hill Cemetery, East Haddam
- Warner Cemetery, East Haddam

== New Haven County ==
- Beth Shalom Cemetery, Orange
- Evergreen Cemetery, New Haven
- Great Hill Cemetery, Seymour
- Grove Street Cemetery, New Haven
- Gunntown Cemetery, Naugatuck
- Milford Cemetery, Milford
- Mount Carmel Cemetery, Hamden
- Naugatuck Grove Cemetery, Naugatuck
- Olde Uptown Burial Ground (also known as Colonial Cemetery), Derby - historians believe this may be the oldest public cemetery in the US
- Orange Center Cemetery, Orange
- Paugassett Burial Grounds (also known as Paugussett Settlement Site), Ansonia (formerly Derby)
- Pine Bridge Cemetery, Beacon Falls
- Pine Grove Cemetery, Ansonia
- St. James Cemetery, Naugatuck
- St. Michael's Cemetery, Derby
- Saint John Catholic Cemetery, Wallingford
- Saint Lawrence Cemetery, West Haven

== New London County ==
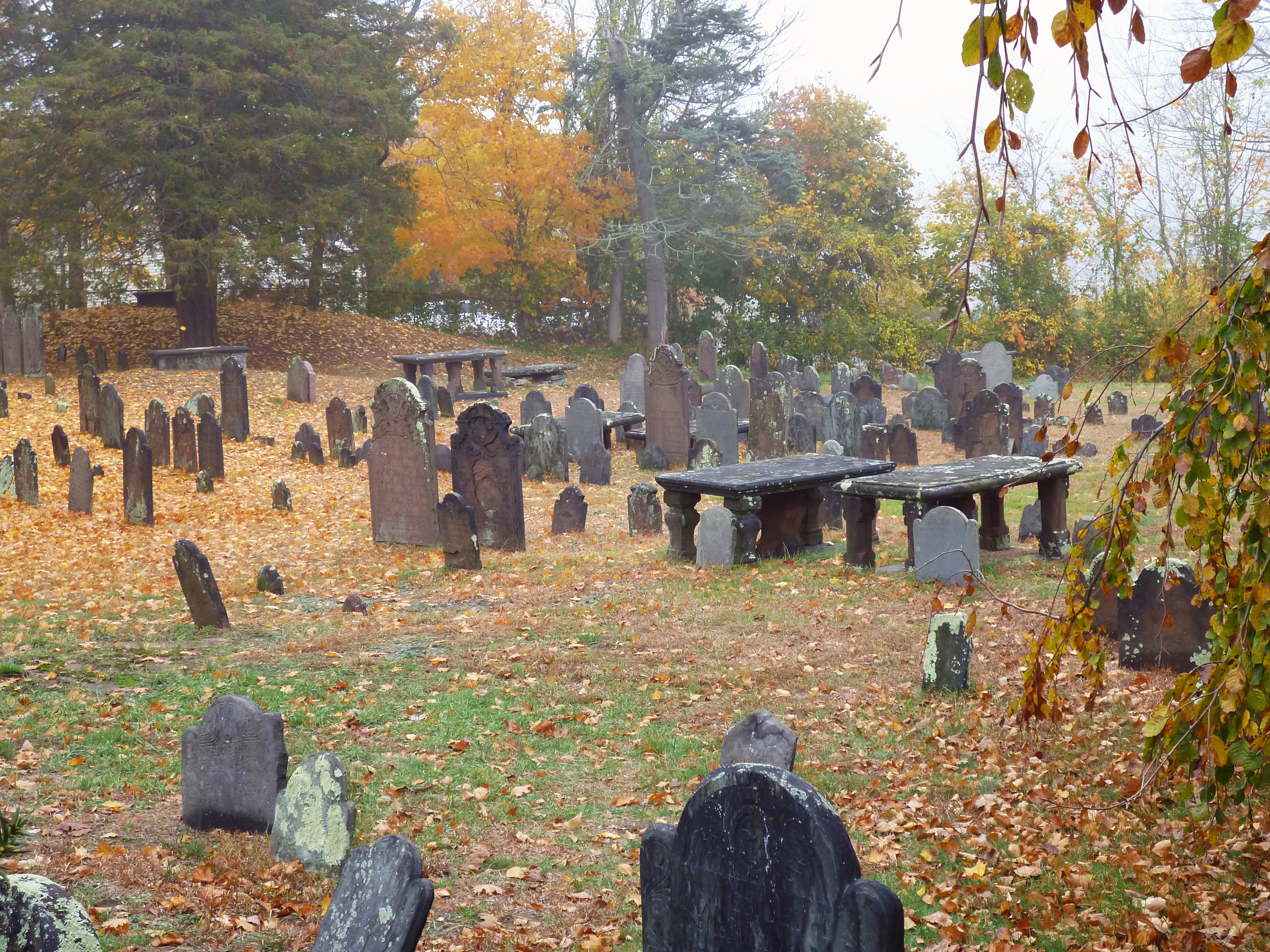
Ye Antientist Burial Ground in New London, New London County

- Almshouse Cemetery, Norwich
- Ames Cemetery, Lisbon
- Antientest Burial Ground, New London
- Avery Cemetery, Preston
- Avery Morgan Burying Ground, Groton
- Brewster's Neck Cemetery, Preston
- Col Ledyard Cemetery, Groton
- Congregational Church Cemetery, Lyme
- Duck River Cemetery, Old Lyme
- Exeter Cemetery, Lebanon
- Goshen Cemetery, Lebanon
- Guiles Stafford Cemetery, Preston
- Johnson Cemetery, Bozrah
- Lebanon Center Cemetery, Lebanon
- Liberty Hill Cemetery, Lebanon
- Linwood Cemetery, Colchester
- Long Society Congregational Burying Ground, Preston
- New Poquetanuck Cemetery, Preston
- Oak Street Cemetery, Norwich
- Old Burial Ground, Colchester
- Old Cemetery, Lebanon
- Old Kinne Burying Ground, Griswold
- Old Norwichtown Cemetery, Norwich
- Old Poquetanuck Cemetery, Preston
- Pachaug Cemetery, Griswold
- Packer Cemetery, Groton
- Palmer Cemetery, Preston
- Pautipaug Cemetery, Franklin
- Plains Cemetery, Franklin
- Preston City Cemetery, Preston
- Read-Haskell Cemetery, Lisbon
- Rixtown Cemetery, Griswold
- St. Joseph's Cemetery, Norwich
- St. Mary's Cemetery, Norwich
- St. Patrick Cemetery, Uncasville.
- Stone Church Cemetery, East Lyme
- Trumbull Cemetery, Lebanon
- Whitehall Cemetery, Mystic

== Tolland County ==
- Andover Road Cemetery, Hebron
- Bolton Center Cemetery, Bolton
- Center Cemetery, Somers
- Ellington Center Cemetery, Ellington
- Gilead Cemetery, Hebron
- Godfrey Hill Cemetery, Hebron
- Grant Hill Cemetery, Coventry
- Jones Street Cemetery, Hebron
- Mansfield Center Cemetery, Mansfield
- Nathan Hale Cemetery, Coventry
- New Andover Cemetery, Andover
- New Storrs Cemetery, Mansfield
- Old Cemetery, Columbia
- Old Andover Cemetery, Andover
- Olde Mansfield Center Cemetery, Mansfield
- Old Storrs Cemetery, Mansfield
- Old Willington Hill Cemetery, Willington
- Old Yard Cemetery, Columbia
- Pink Ravine Cemetery, Mansfield
- Quarryville Cemetery, Bolton
- South Cemetery, Tolland
- St. Peter's Cemetery, Hebron
- Silver Street Cemetery, Coventry
- Skungamaug Cemetery, Tolland
- South Street Cemetery, Coventry
- Townsend Cemetery, Andover
- Union Center Cemetery, Union

== Windham County ==
- Abington Cemetery, Pomfret
- Aspinwall Cemetery, Putnam
- Bara-Hack Cemetery, Pomfret
- Bungay Cemetery, Woodstock
- East Woodstock Cemetery, Woodstock
- Litchfield Cemetery, Hampton
- New South Killingly Cemetery, Killingly
- North Cemetery, Hampton
- Old Cemetery, Eastford
- Old Scotland Cemetery North, Scotland
- Old South Killingly Cemetery, Killingly
- Palmertown Cemetery, Scotland
- Plainfield Cemetery, Plainfield
- South Cemetery, Ashford
- South Cemetery, Brooklyn
- South Cemetery, Hampton
- South Cemetery, Pomfret
- Snow Cemetery, Ashford
- St. Joseph's Cemetery, Killingly
- Swamp Burying Ground, Ashford
- Warrenville Cemetery, Ashford
- West Thompson Cemetery, Thompson
- Westford Cemetery, Ashford
- Westford Hill Cemetery, Ashford
- Windham Center Cemetery, Windham
- Woodstock Hill Cemetery, Woodstock
- Woodward Cemetery, Ashford

== See also ==
- List of cemeteries in the United States
