= Albemarle–Kenmore Terraces Historic District =

Historic district in Brooklyn, New York

- U.S. National Register of Historic Places
- U.S. Historic district
- New York State Register of Historic Places
- New York City Landmark
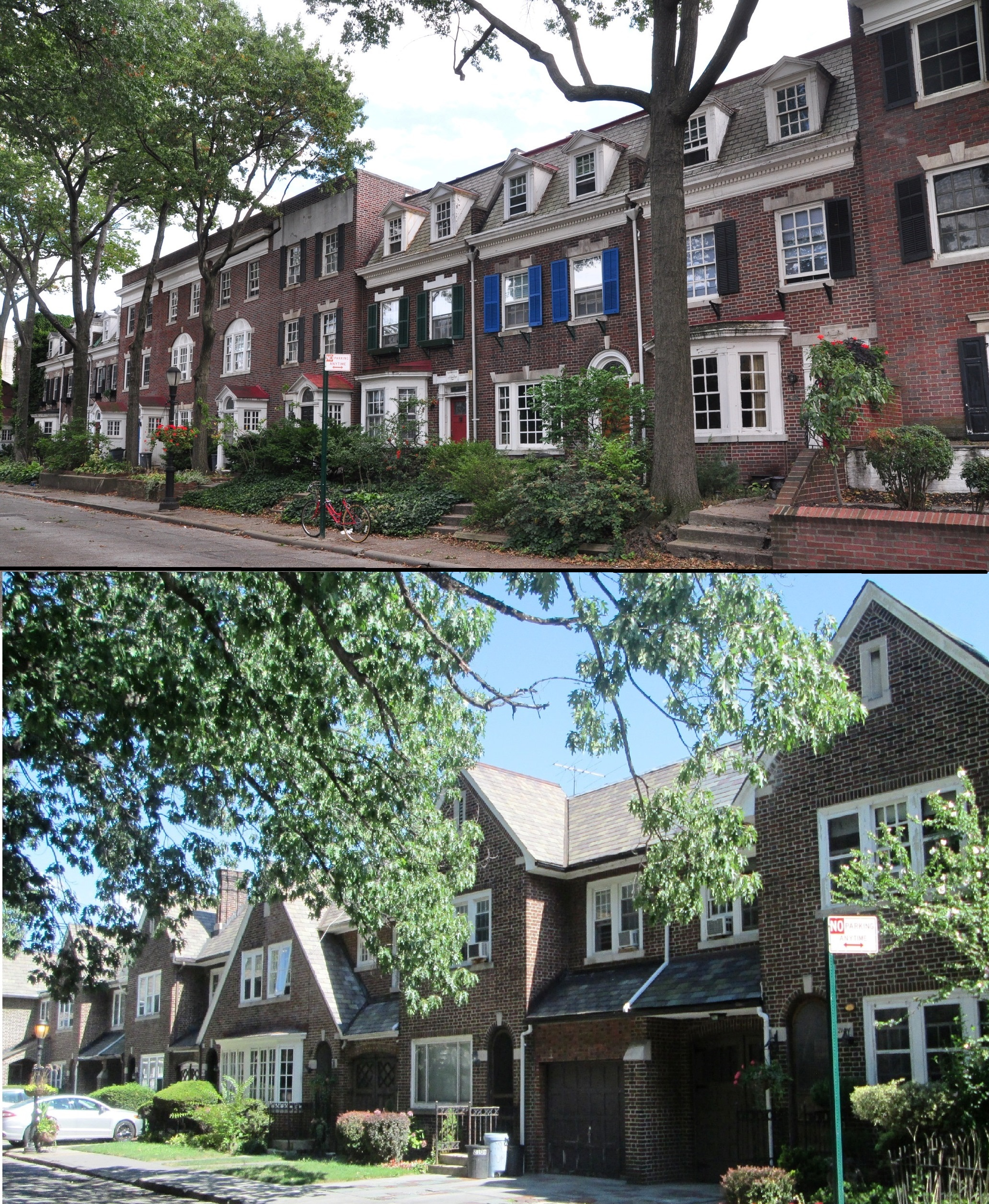
- top: Albemarle Terrace, south side (September 2012) bottom: Kenmore Terrace, south side (August 2013)

- Location within New York City Location within New York Location within the United States
- Location: Albemarle Terr. & Kenmore Terr. at E. 21st St. Brooklyn, New York City
- Coordinates: 40°39′3″N 73°57′33″W
- Area: 2 acres (0.81 ha)
- Built: 1916-20
- Architect: Slee & Bryson
- Architectural style: Albemarle: Colonial Revival; Kenmore: English Arts & Crafts
- NRHP reference No.: 83001685
- NYCL No.: 0989

Significant dates
- Added to NRHP: June 30, 1983
- Designated NYSRHP: May 3, 1983
- Designated NYCL: July 11, 1978

The Albemarle–Kenmore Terraces Historic District is a small historic district located in the Flatbush neighborhood of Brooklyn, New York City. It consists of two short cul-de-sacs, Albemarle Terrace and Kenmore Terrace, off of East 21st Street, and the 32 houses on the two streets, as well as a four-family apartment building at the end of Albemarle Terrace. The New York City Landmarks Preservation Commission, which designated the district as a landmark in 1978, noted that the "terraces are distinguished by the uniform use of materials, height and color producing a harmonious effect".

== Architecture ==
The structures were designed by the local firm of Slee & Bryson, but differ in style between the two streets.

=== Albemarle Terrace ===
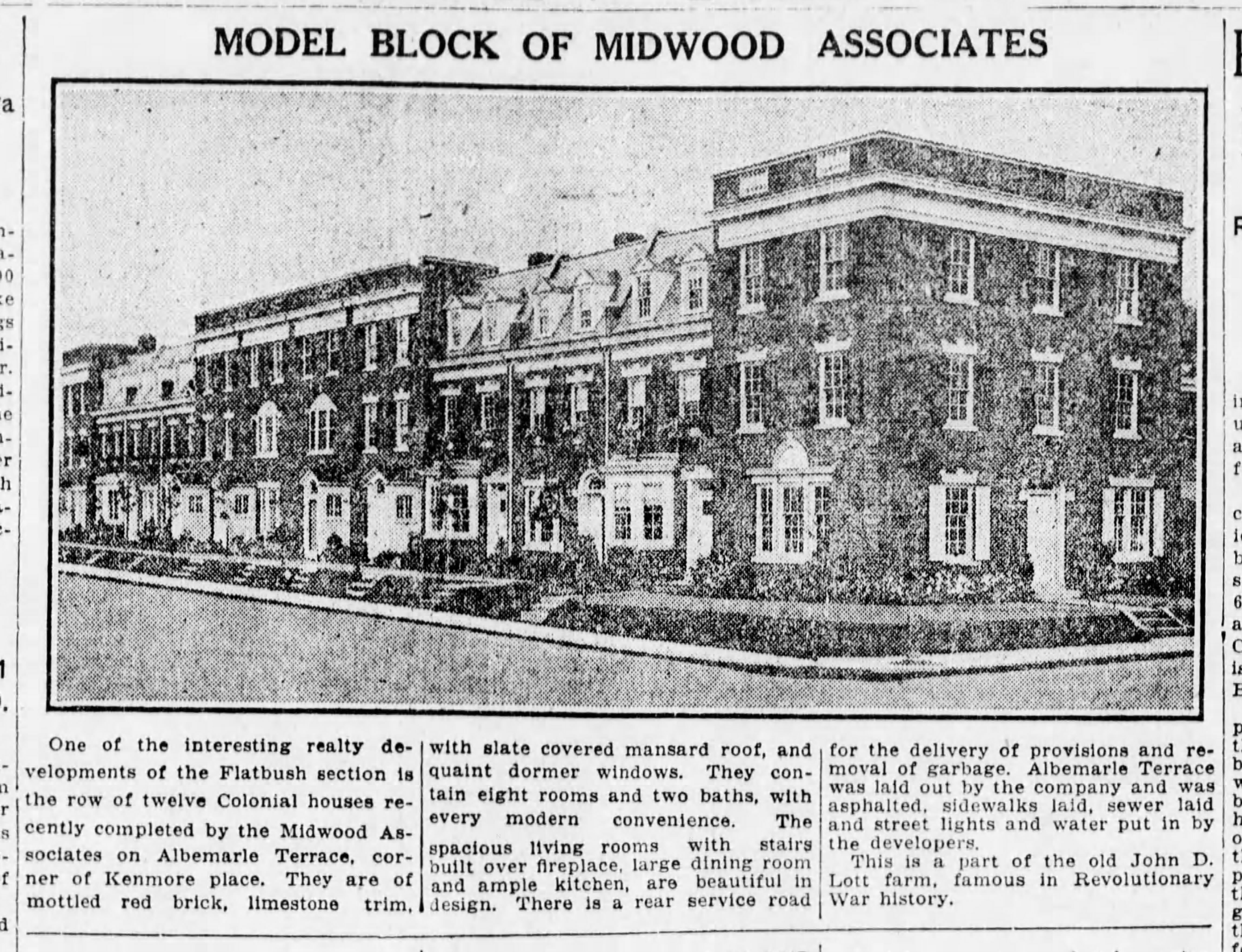
Midwood Associates advertisement in the Brooklyn Daily Eagle, August 1916.

The houses on Albemarle Terrace, built between 1916 and 1917, are Colonial Revival two and one-half- or three-story brick buildings located on courts and raised above street level behind terraces or front gardens. Many of these gardens are shaded by a generous canopy of mature Pin Oak trees. The buildings on Albemarle Terrace have long been praised by architectural critics as "the most fully realized Neo-Federal houses in the city—especially the smaller, gabled houses with dormers—they represent perfect bookends of New York's row house building history stretching from 1783 to 1917".

The southern row of Albemarle Terrace was constructed from 1916 to 1917 as the "model" homes and were generally alike in form and finish. The homes on the northern row were constructed between 1917 and 1918, and buyers were able to choose from an array of trim packages and finishes inside.

Both rows use the same material: red brick (with occasional burned singles) laid up in the Flemish bond pattern, limestone ornament, white-painted wood trim. Two general types of structure are used in both rows: "an 'A' type of three stories with flat roofs, and a 'B' type of two stories with a pitched attic story". Each type has two subtypes, with variance in fenestration between the two. For the A-type, A1 features four symmetrical 6-over-6 double hung windows on the upper two floors, while the second story of A2 features a triple window, underneath an elliptical arch with a fluted sunburst design. For the B-type, B1 features a triple-windowed bay at the first story, and a rectangular doorway consisting of a multi-light paneled door with a leaded glass transom, flanked by fluted pilasters, and topped with a limestone lintel carved with a paneled urn motif. B2 has an unbroken front facade, with a triple window instead of the bay, and an arched doorway with leaded glass fanlight flanked by Greek-revival style Doric colonettes. Copper roofing adorns the enclosed stoops on the A-type houses, as well as the dormers and bay windows on the B-types, with the pitched attic stories finished with Vermont Green slate roofs.

==== Addresses and numbering ====
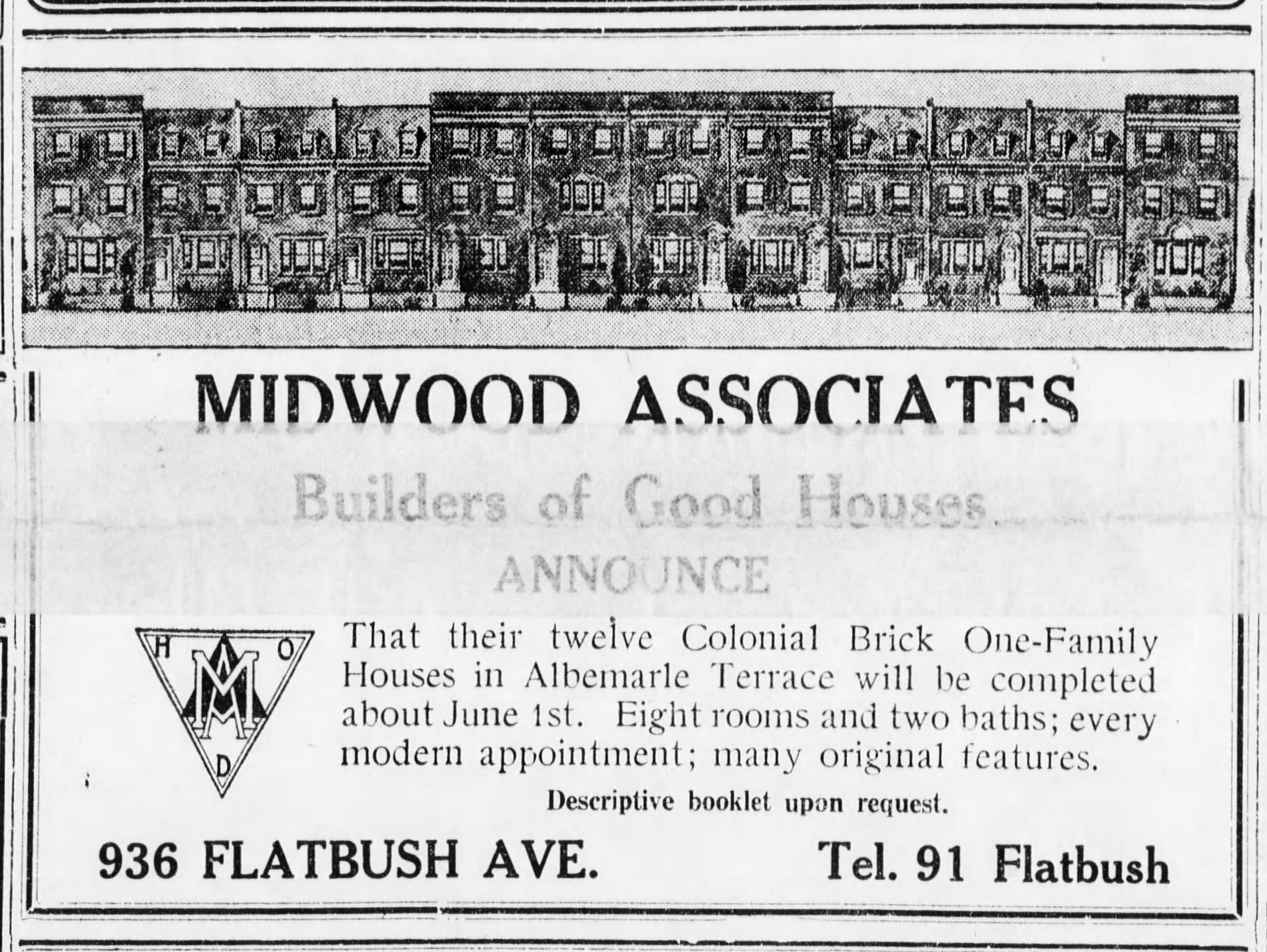
1916 advertisement by Midwood Associates showing the southern elevation of Albemarle Terrace. Published in the Brooklyn Daily Eagle, May 1917.

Due to the nature of the "mirrored" elevation combined with the dead-end block, Albemarle Terrace's address naming is not straightforward.

- Homes on the south side are even, and number from 2104–2114 and 2118–2126.
- Homes on the north side are odd, and number from 2103–2111 and 2115–2123.
- While the end-cap homes are a part of the development—255 East 21st Street to the south and 237 East 21st Street to the north—they do not have Albemarle Terrace addresses due to their means of egress existing on the perpendicular block.
- The aforementioned four-family apartment building is numbered 2127–2128, with the odd entrance accessible from the northern walk and the even entrance from the southern.

2113 and 2116 are not present in the house numbering system, presumably due to the "mirror" of the row that occurs at the midpoint in the street. While 2125 may have once been a separate lot during the construction of the block, it was instead purchased by the initial residents of 2123 for use as a carriage house, which has since been converted into living space, making 2123 Albemarle Terrace the largest home in the development.

=== Kenmore Terrace ===
On Kenmore Terrace, three of the houses are also in the Colonial Revival style, one of which was built in 1918 and other two in 1919–20, but the remaining six on the south side of the street show the influence of the Garden city movement, and were designed in the English Arts and Crafts style. These Kenmore cottages were built in 1918–19, and presage the automobile-based look of many suburbs built in the decades to come, as each house has a driveway leading to a private garage.

== Historic designation ==
The historic district was designated by the New York City Landmarks Preservation Commission in 1978, and was listed on the National Register of Historic Places in 1983.

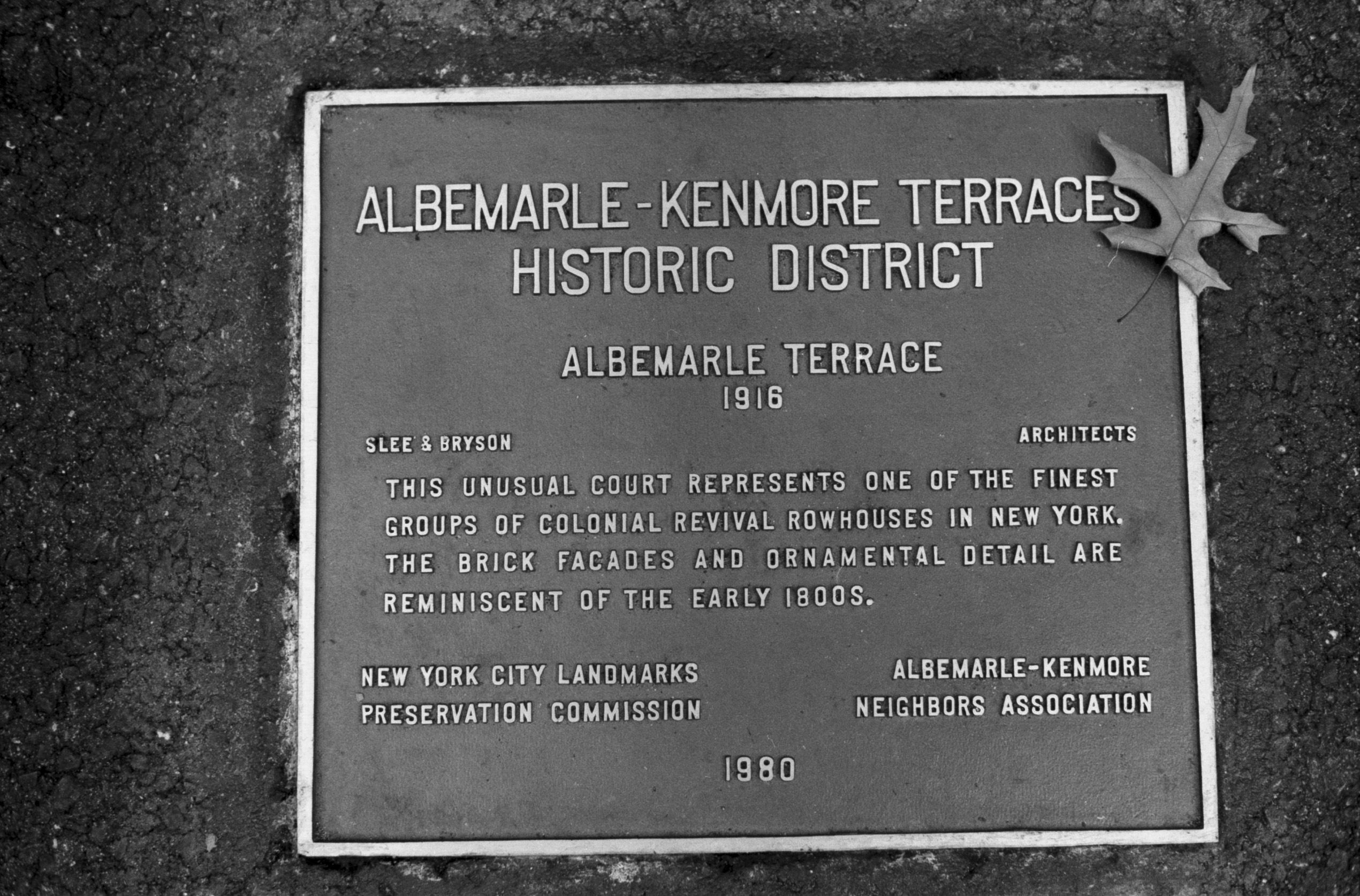
File:Albemarle-plaque.jpg

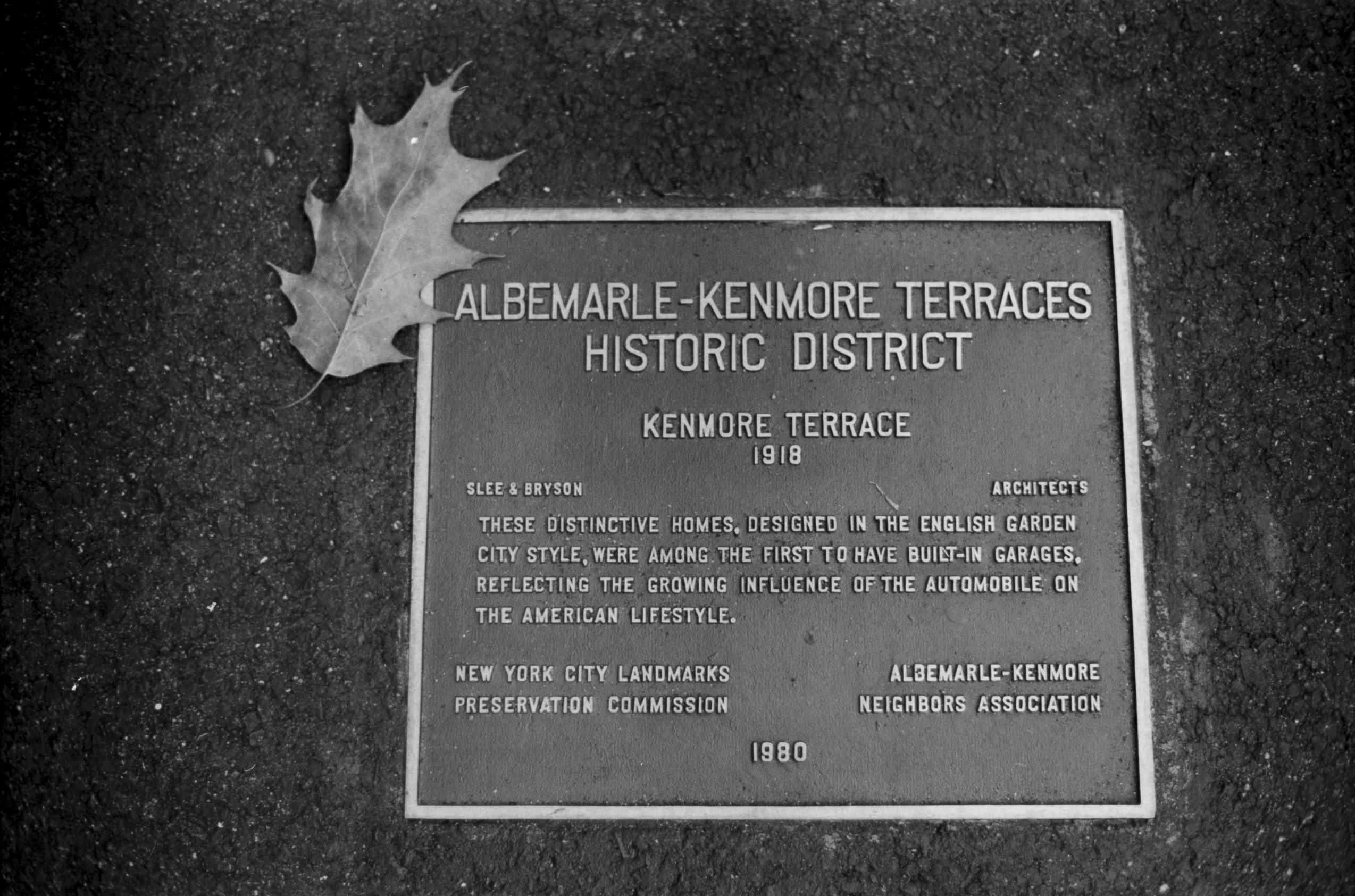
File:Kenmore-plaque.jpg

== Notable surroundings ==
Located on Kenmore Terrace, but not part of the historic district, is the landmarked parsonage of the Flatbush Reformed Dutch Church, a two and one-half-story wood-frame house designed in a vernacular style transitional between the Greek Revival and Italianate styles. The parsonage was built in 1853 on the west side of Flatbush Avenue (near present-day 892 Flatbush Avenue), and moved to its present location in 1918.

The historic district is close to a number of other New York City landmarks, such as Erasmus Hall High School, Flatbush Town Hall, Kings Theater, and the now-razed Flatbush District No.1 School (landmarked in 2007, but demolished in 2015) which was built in 1890 atop the site of the Flatbush African Burial Ground. The United States Post Office - Flatbush Station stands across from the site of the former school, and is listed on the U.S. National Register of Historic Places.

Additionally, a handful of non-landmarked yet architecturally significant buildings stand nearby:

- 2101 Church Avenue opened in 1928 as the Keith-Albee Kenmore Theatre—a vaudeville house—and later became a single screen movie theater, split up into four screens in 1970. The theater is now occupied by retail chain Target, among others. The building was designed by Eugene De Rosa, with its southern elevation adorned with Colonial Revival architectural vernacular similar to the buildings on Albemarle Terrace, as well as the church house of the Flatbush Reformed Dutch Church opposite it.
- 2127 Church Avenue/882 Flatbush Avenue once housed the office of Midwood Associates—the developer of the historic district—and still stands with marquees bearing the branding "Midwood Associates Buildings" along the southern and eastern façades.
- 261 East 21st St housed The Third Church of Christ, Scientist and was built in Greek Revival style, constructed in 1929 to the south of Albemarle Terrace at 261 East 21st St. Modeled after the Third Church's first house of worship in Harlem, it was designed by architects Cherry & Matz, who designed listed buildings such as Manhattan's Fourth Church of Christ, Scientist (now the Hebrew Tabernacle of Washington Heights) and the First Reformed Church of Piermont, New York. It has been the property of the Flatbush Seventh-day Adventist Church since July 1982.

Despite the changing landscape of Brooklyn as a whole, the area directly surrounding the historic district is remarkably intact in form from when it was developed after the Lott farm was sold in 1910.

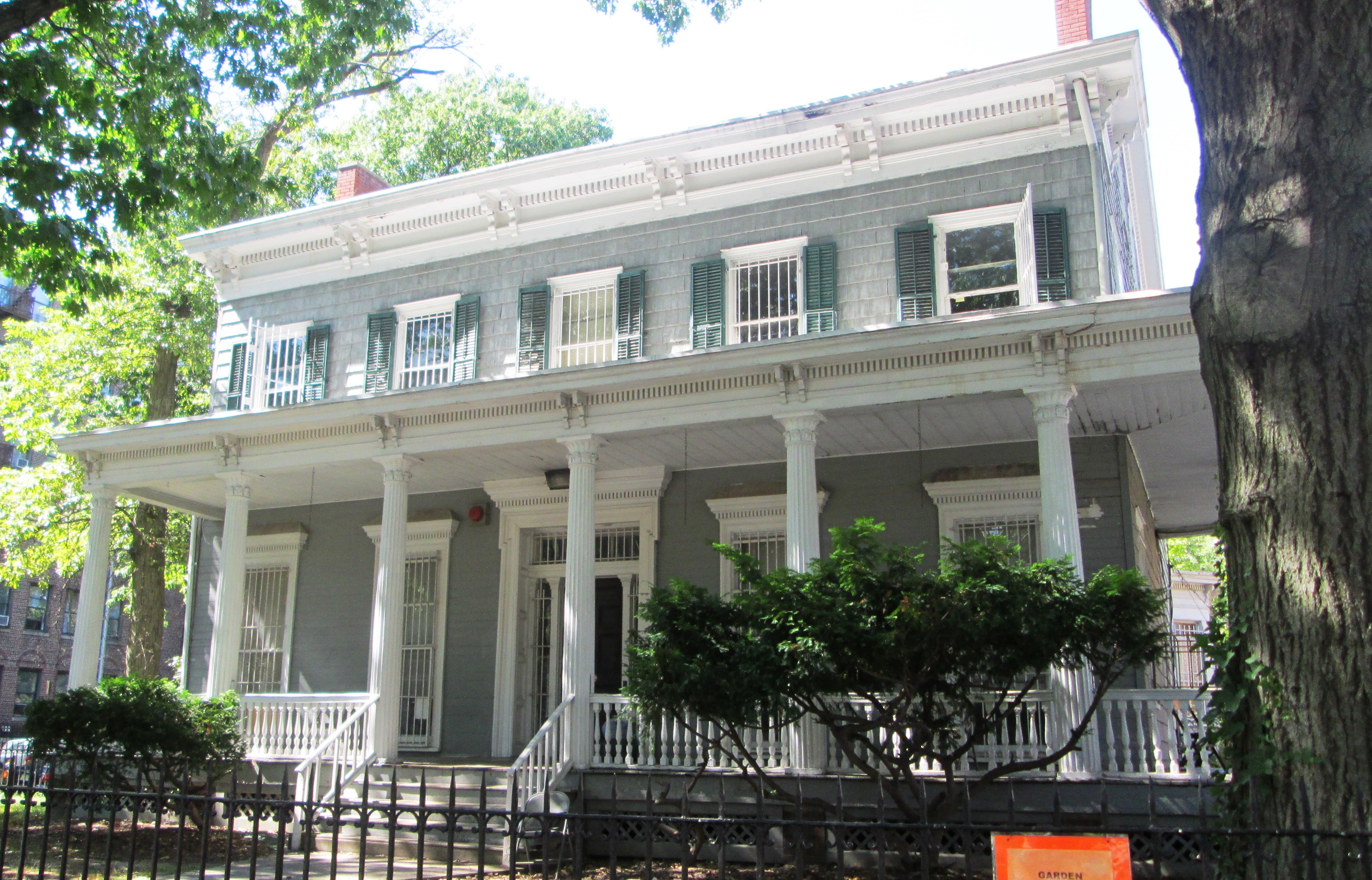
Parsonage of the Flatbush Dutch Reformed Church at 2103 Kenmore Terrace

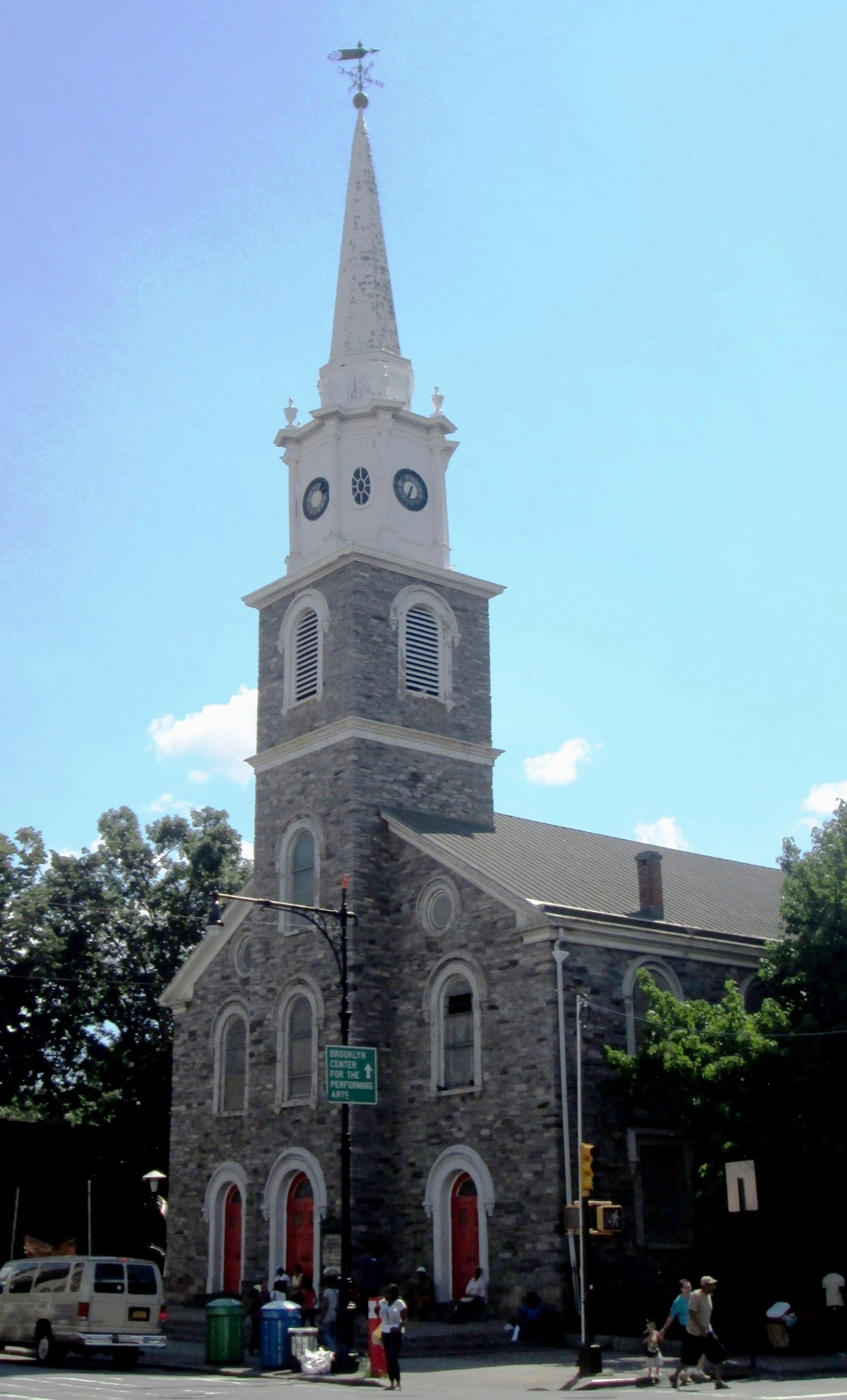
Flatbush Reformed Dutch Church at 890 Flatbush Avenue

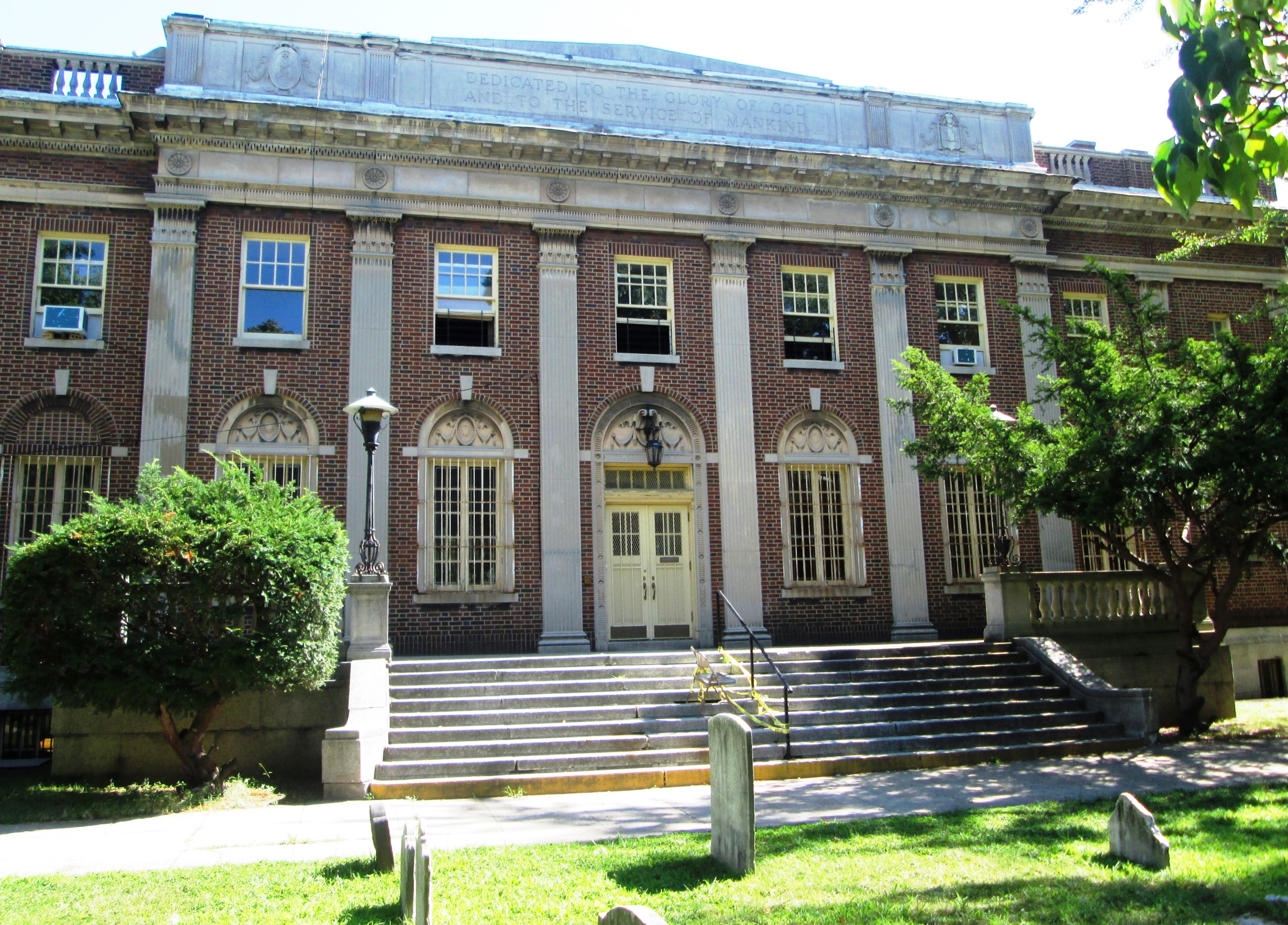
Church house of the Flatbush Reformed Dutch Church

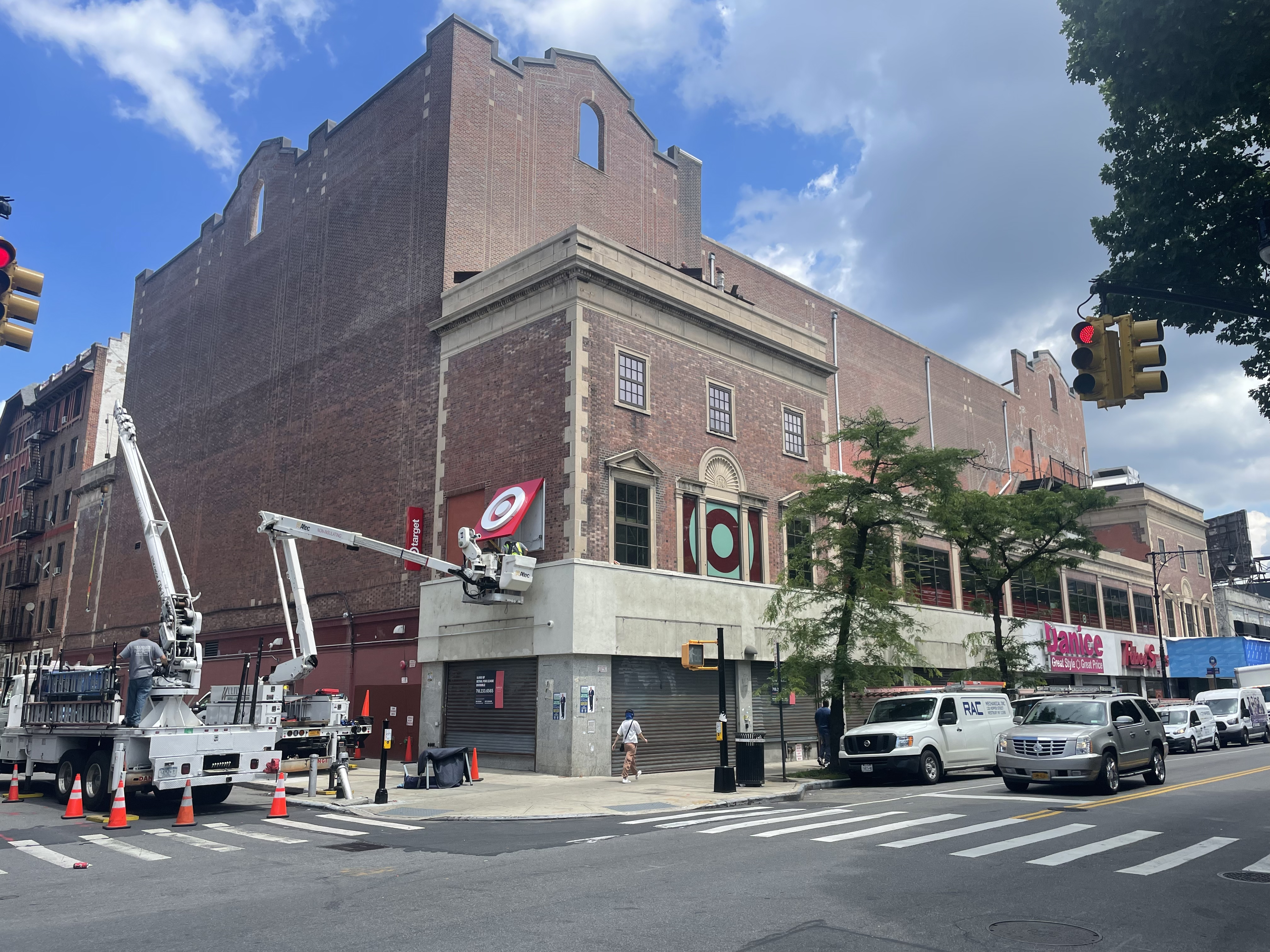
Keith-Albee Kenmore Theatre at 2101 Church Avenue

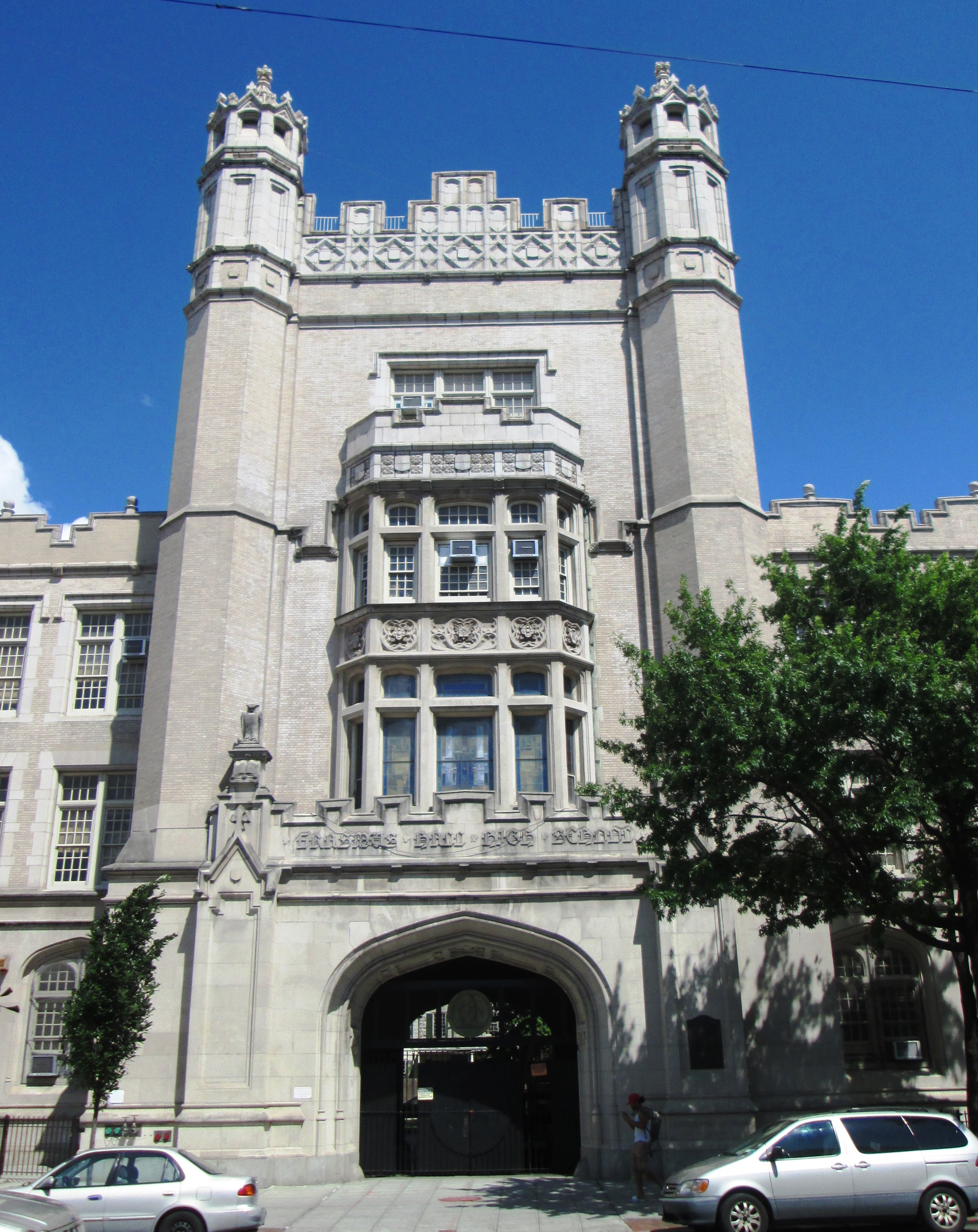
Erasmus Hall High School at 911 Flatbush Avenue

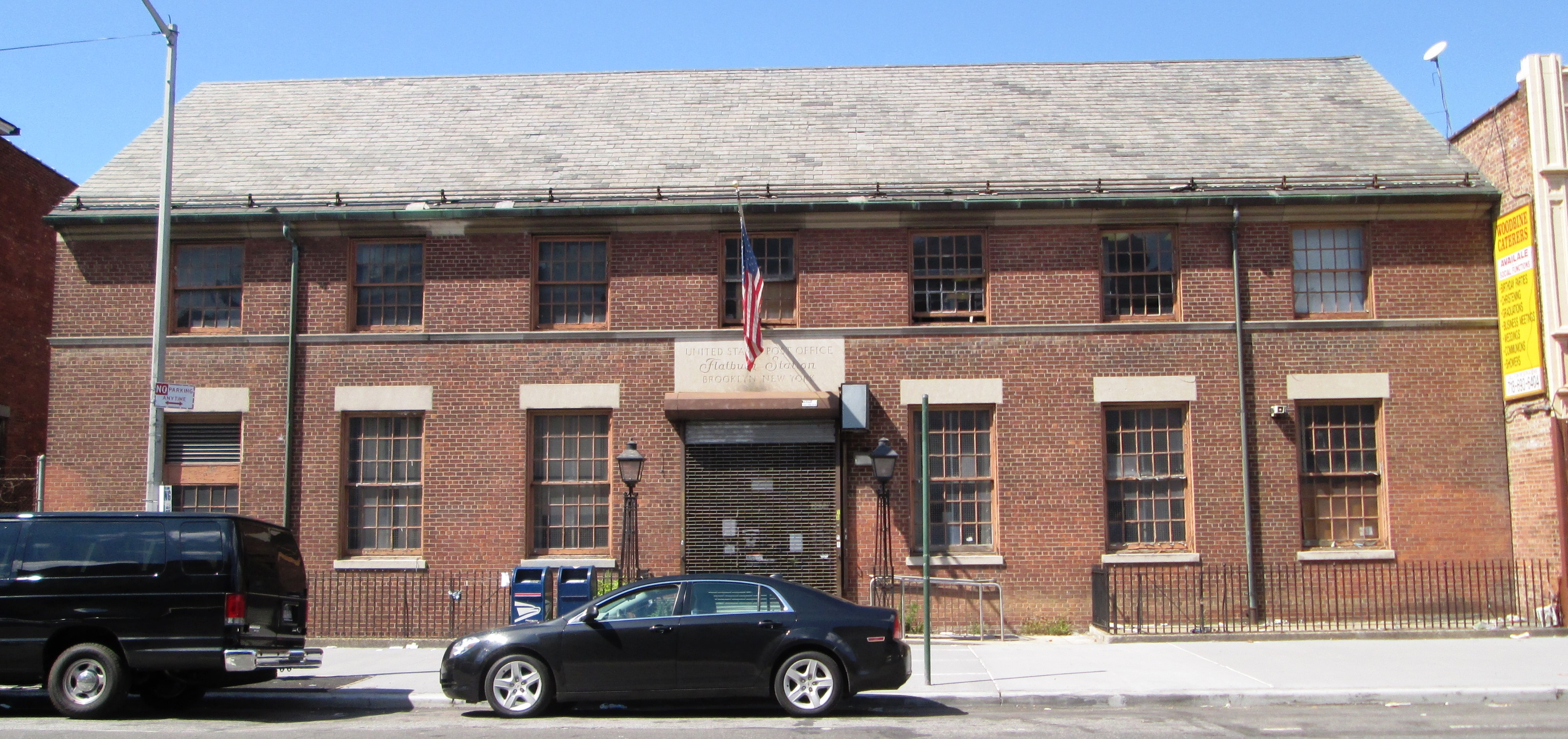
United States Post Office - Flatbush Station at 2273 Church Avenue

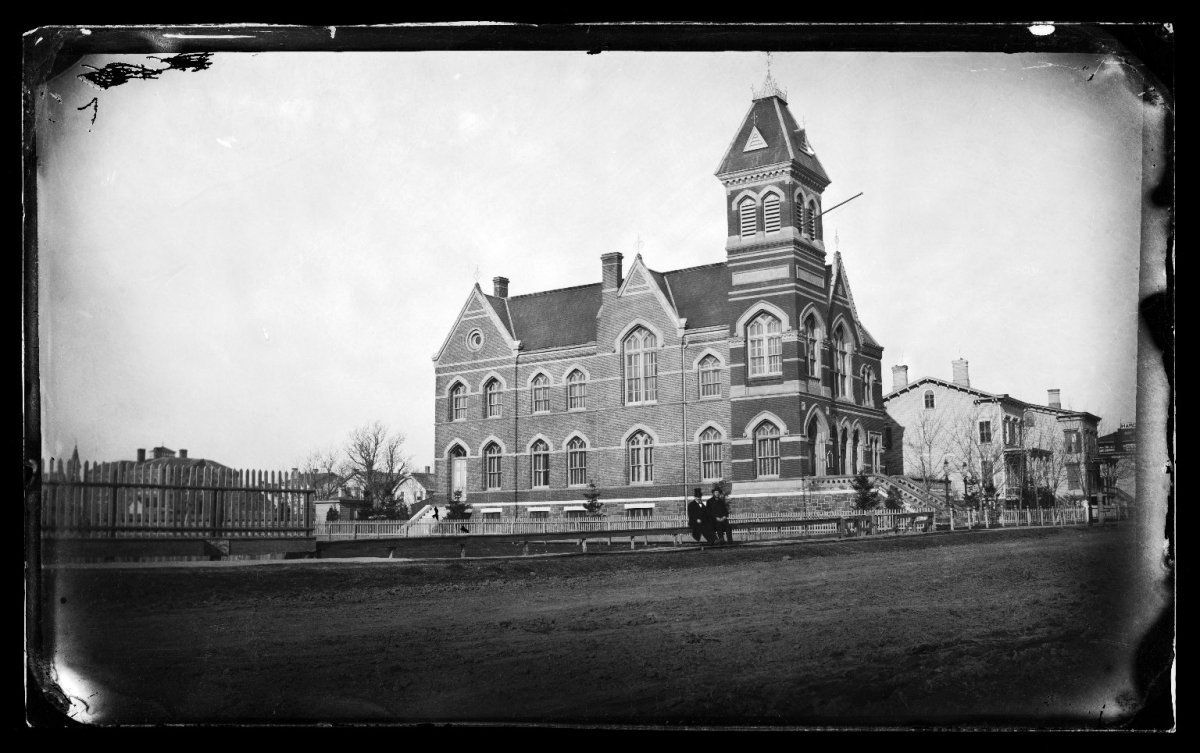
Flatbush Town Hall at 35 Snyder Avenue

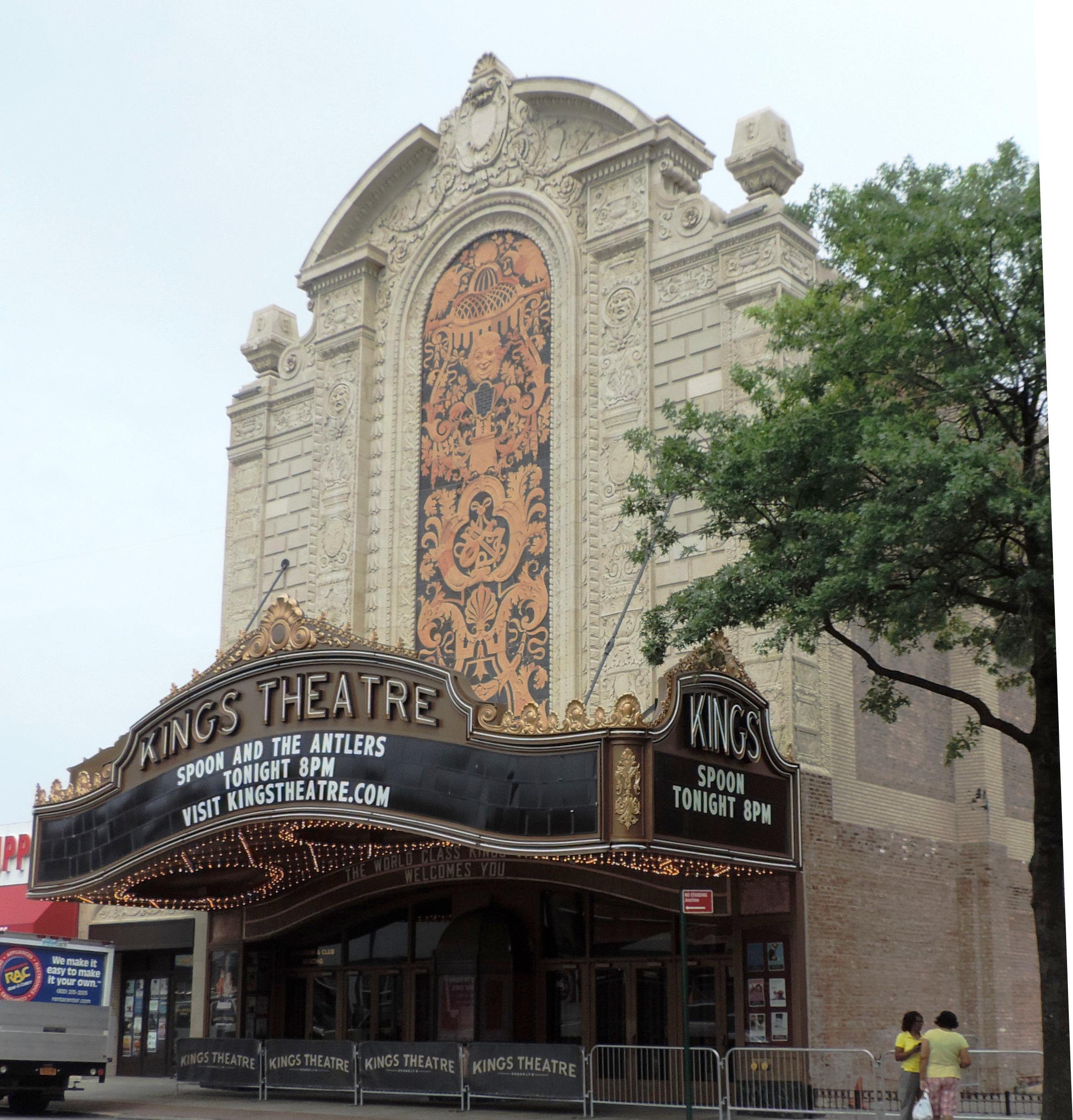
Kings Theatre at 1027 Flatbush Avenue

== Transportation ==
The historic district is closest to the New York City Subway station at Church Avenue (B and Q trains) and is accessible via two MTA-operated local bus routes: the B35 on Church Avenue, and the B41 route on Flatbush Avenue.

== See also ==
- List of New York City Landmarks
- National Register of Historic Places listings in Kings County, New York
