= Aucke Janse Van Nuys =

Carpenter

Aucke Janse Van Nuys (1622-1698) was a carpenter and a government official in New Amsterdam. He built the Brooklyn Ferry, the First Dutch Reformed Church in Flatbush, NY, the longest standing place of worship in New York City, and some of the earliest structures in what is now New York City. He was appointed schepen (magistrate) of the town in 1673. He pledged allegiance to the King of England in 1689, and was a patentee of large areas of the Bowery and Long Island, given to him by Governor Peter Stuyvesant.

Also known as: “Aucke Janse van Nuyse, Aucke Jans Van Huys, Aucke Jansen.”

Aucke Janse Van Nuys emigrated to the United States in 1651 with his wife and 4 children from Amsterdam, and probably came originally from a village named Nuis in Groningen.

He initially lived in what is now Manhattan and built some of the city's earliest structures.

He then helped build the infrastructure for the Brooklyn ferry, and then the first church built in New York City, the First Dutch Reformed Church.

Governor Stuyvesant ordered that the church be at least 60 feet long, and 28 feet wide, with a ceiling height of 12 to 14 feet. The project took six years and the church stood until 1699, replaced with a more solid one that lasted another 100 years. The current First Dutch Reformed church was built in the 1790s, but still occupies the site of where Aucke helped build the original one.

In 1673 Governor Colve appointed him schepen (magistrate), an office similar to that of alderman of the present time, and in 1674 he was one of the representatives to the "Convention of Delegates" called by the governor to meet in New Orange (Albany) after the capture of the Netherlands from the British. His name is in the list of those who in 1687 took the oath of allegiance to James II and Great Britain after New Netherland had been re-taken by the British. A facsimile of his signature is given in Stiles' History of Kings County, New York.

The last names Van Nuys and Okie (simplification of the name), that Auke brought to America, were spread throughout the United States among his descendants. One of them, Isaac Newton Van Nuys (1836-1912), gave his name to the town of Van Nuys, California, part of the San Fernando Valley in Los Angeles. He was a businessman, farmer and rancher who owned the entire southern portion of the San Fernando Valley.
