= Byram Cemetery =

Cemetery in Greenwich, Connecticut

Coordinates: 41.0013°N 73.6477°W

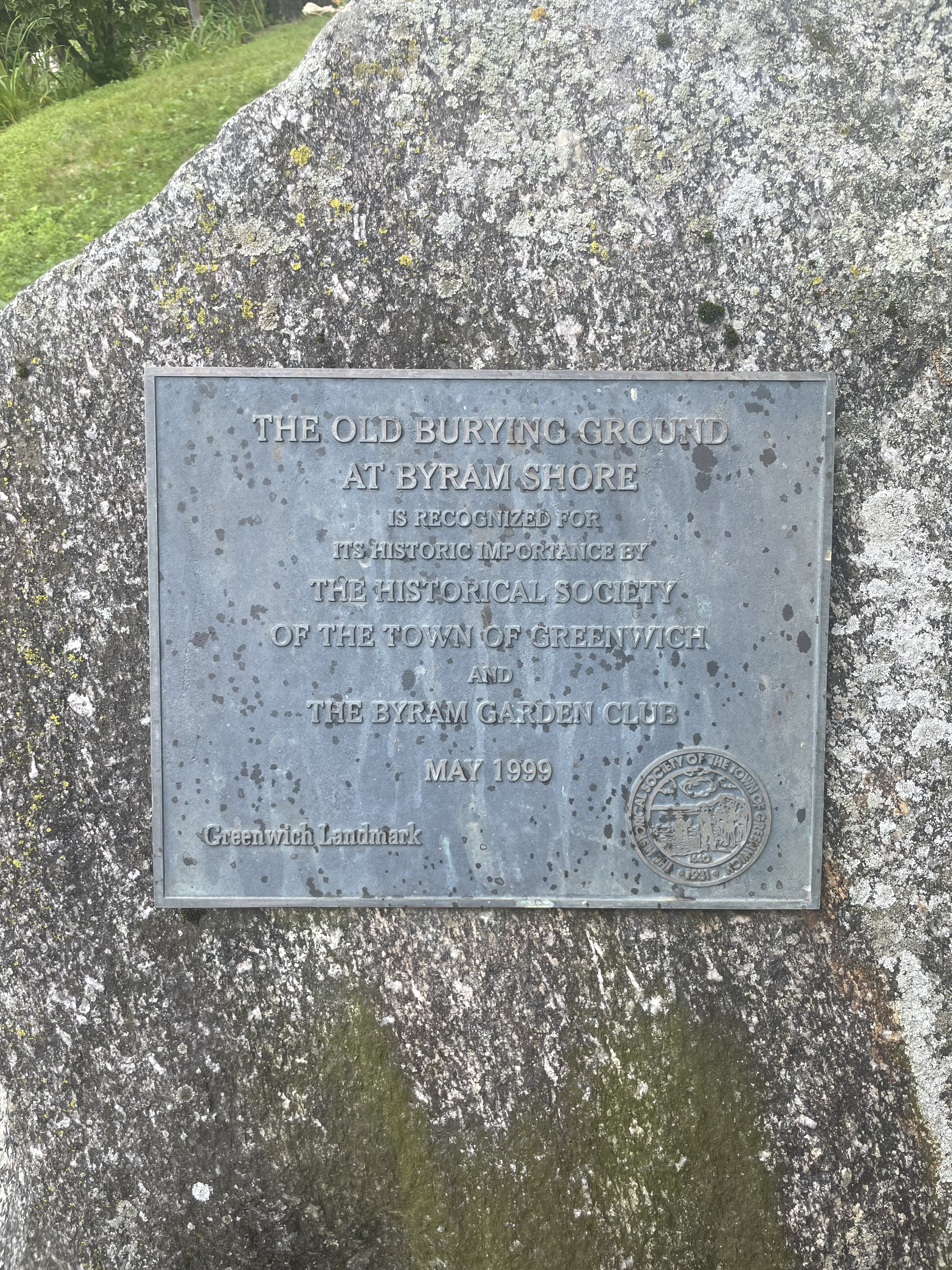
Plaque at entrance of Byram Cemetery

The Byram Cemetery (or the Old Burial Ground at Byram Shore Road) is a cemetery in Greenwich, Connecticut. It has headstones dated back to the 1700s, making it one of the oldest gravesites in the town. The cemetery is divided into 3 sections, one section for early settlers, the Lyon cemetery, and the African American cemetery. There are graves of Civil War veterans also located in the burial ground.

== The Lyons ==
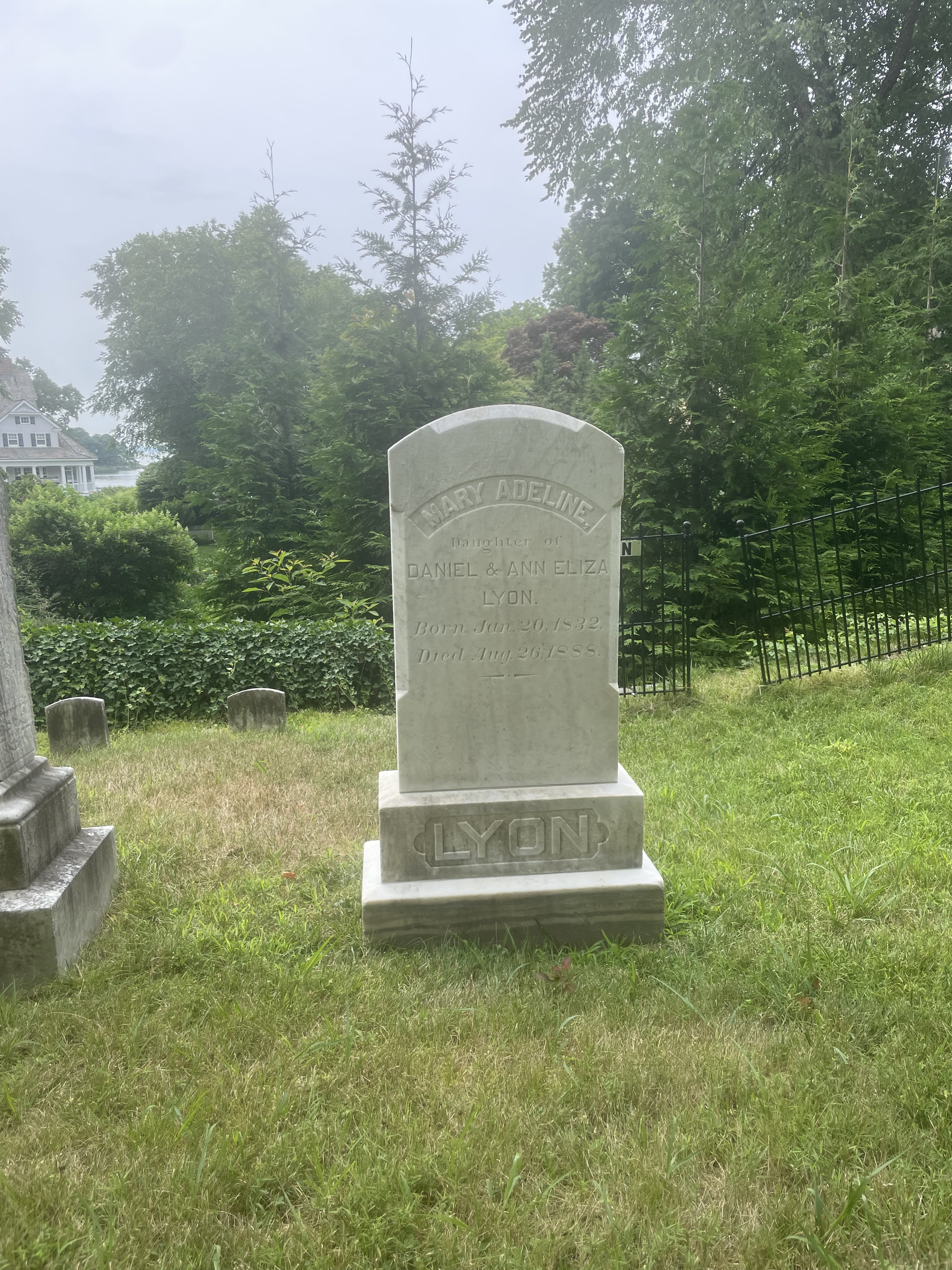
Headstone for one of the Lyon family members.

Connected to the cemetery is the former James Lyon House. Built in 1750, the house has since been demolished. The Lyon family can be traced back to the original Greenwich settlers, with Thomas Lyon arriving to Greenwich in 1649 from England.

The Lyons were prominent early settlers and owned large plots of land. In 1688 there were only 300 people in Greenwich, and Thomas was one of 52 of the landowners with around 360 acres of land.

The Lyon family owned slaves and buried them within the grave site on an unmarked section which is now known as the African American Cemetery.

== Recent history ==
Recent disputes have focused on whether the Town of Greenwich or neighboring residents are responsible for the graveyard's maintenance. These questions arose after Chris Antonik, the former resident of the James Lyon House who personally cared for the gravesite for over 30 years, passed in 2015. This led to the graveyard to become overrun with weeds.

=== The Stewarts ===
In 2017, a family by the name of Stewart moved into a house neighboring the graveyard, and sought to build a driveway by expanding their plot of land into the nearby gravesite. This caused a lawsuit between the Stewarts and the town of Greenwich over the potential desecration of the unmarked African American burial ground. The Stewarts claimed that in a survey of the land, no remains were found, however historical maps of the cemetery label that section of land as the African-American Cemetery.

=== Result of the lawsuit ===
Teresa Vega is one of the descendants of those buried in the gravesite and has worked to trace African and Native American heritage back to Greenwich and the Byram grave site. She has a blog documenting her findings, the court case, and research.

In a settlement reached in 2018, the three gravesites became the property of the state, and a plaque is to be placed to mark the African American cemetery.

=== Local volunteers ===
Local resident Alex Popp has worked with other volunteers to maintain and upkeep the maintenance of the cemetery and to preserve the history within the gravesite. Popp documents his work in a Facebook group.

=== Funding from the state ===
Ned Lamont, the governor of Connecticut, made an announcement in 2023 that the cemetery would be receiving US$5,000 in funding to restore broken graves and to maintain the site.
