= Cypress Cemetery =

Historic cemetery in Connecticut

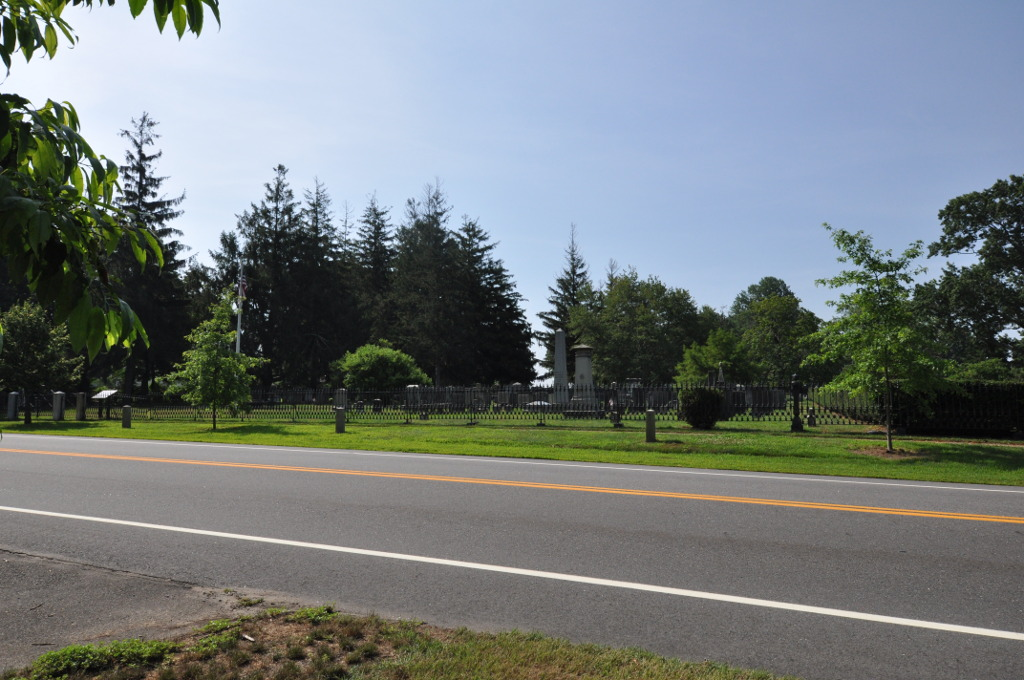
- Interactive map of Cypress Cemetery

Details
- Established: 17th century
- Location: 100 College Street, Old Saybrook, Connecticut
- Country: United States
- Coordinates: 41°16′58″N 72°21′17″W
- Website: http://cypresscemeteryosct.org/
- Find a Grave: Cypress Cemetery

Cypress Cemetery is an historic cemetery at 100 College Street in Old Saybrook, Connecticut. Established sometime in the 17th century, and still in active use, it is the town's oldest cemetery, with a wide variety of funerary art dating from the 17th to 21st centuries. The cemetery's oldest portion was listed on the National Register of Historic Places in 2018.

== Description and history ==
Cypress Cemetery is located on Saybrook Point, southeast of the town center, on the south side of College Street. College Street is the main road on the point, which extends easterly to the Connecticut River, and is bounded by North Cove and South Cove. The eastern end of Saybrook Point is where the English Saybrook Colony was founded in 1635. While it is believed that the cemetery may have been laid out by the colony's founder, Lion Gardiner not long after the colony's establishment, there is no evidence to support the idea. The oldest documented burial sites in the cemetery date to 1679, and the cemetery continues to be actively used for burials.

The cemetery is roughly rectangular, and occupies about 6 acres (2.4 ha). The street-facing edge is lined by a cast-iron fence, with gates for vehicular and pedestrian access. The older portion of the cemetery is about 3.5 acres (1.4 ha) in size and contains stones dating back to the 17th century. The yard contains a great variety of colonial gravestone carvers including those from Middletown, Boston, Newport, East Haddam, Durham, Windsor, Middlefield, Windham, and New London. The burial ground does not have a discernible organizing pattern – plots are laid out without particular regard to orientation or any formally laid out paths. The funerary monuments represent an artistic cross-section of New England colonial funerary practices, including examples of Boston stone cutters of the 17th and 18th century whose work is rarely found in Connecticut.

Anna Louise James is among those buried there, as is Lady Alice Fenwick (the first wife of George Fenwick).

== See also ==
- List of cemeteries in Connecticut
- National Register of Historic Places listings in Middlesex County, Connecticut
