= Joseph Platt Cooke =

American politician

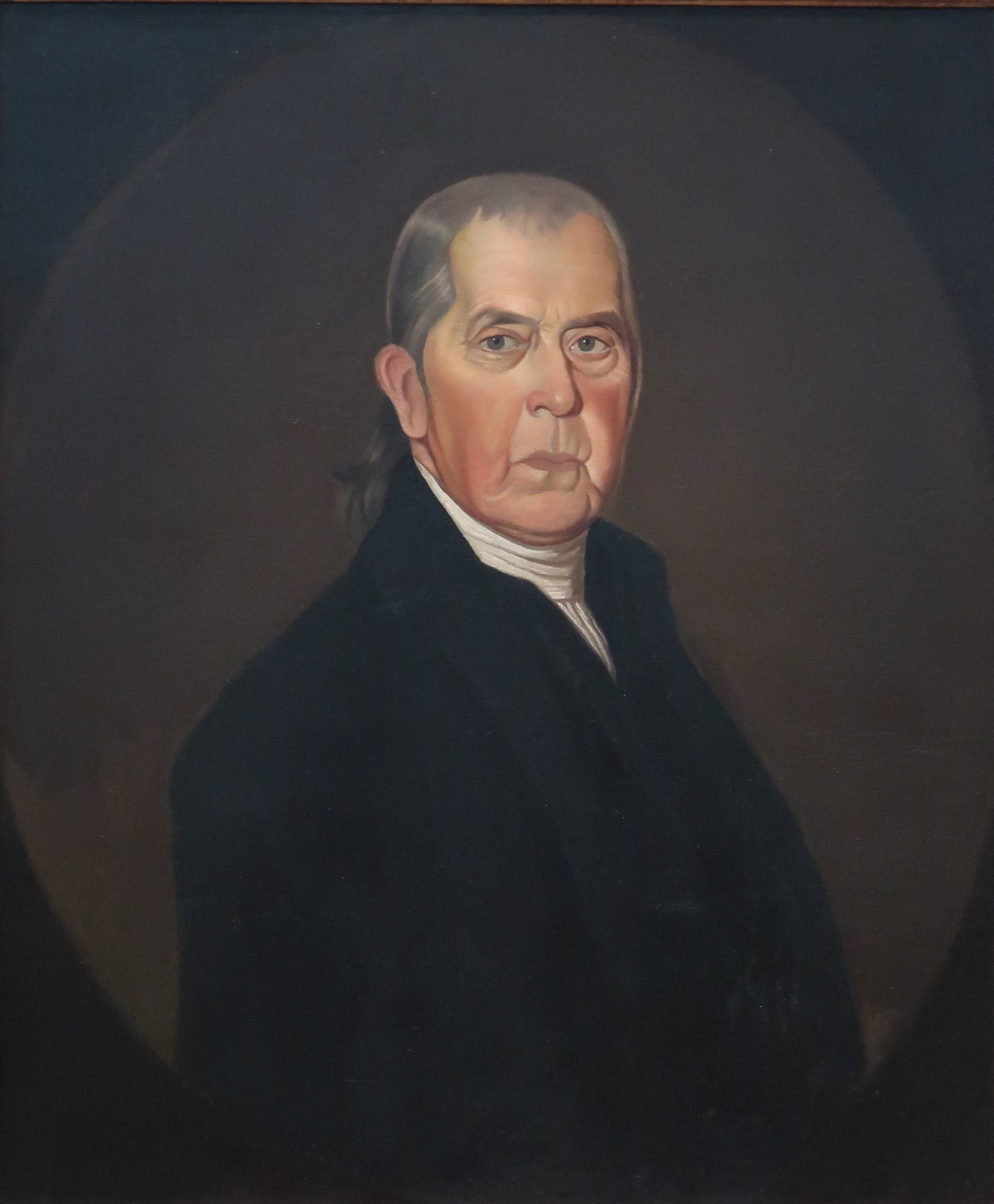
- Portrait of Colonel Joseph Platt Cooke, oil on panel by William Jennys, c. 1790-1795, Honolulu Museum of Art
- Born: January 4, 1730; Stratford, Connecticut Colony
- Died: February 3, 1816 (aged 86)
- Allegiance: United States
- Branch: Continental Army
- Conflicts: American Revolutionary War

Joseph Platt Cooke (January 4, 1730 – February 3, 1816) was an American military officer in the Revolutionary War, a Connecticut politician, and twice a delegate to the Congress of the Confederation. He was born in Stratford, Connecticut and graduated from Yale College in 1750. He died in Danbury, Connecticut.

He was the son of Reverend Samuel Cooke, and Elizabeth Platt. His grandfather Joseph Platt, also served in the Connecticut House of Representatives for many years.

In 1771, he was appointed colonel of the Sixteenth Regiment of the Connecticut militia, and during the American Revolutionary War he accompanied General Wolcott's forces to New York in 1776. He was in command of the state forces when the British burned Danbury on April 26 and April 27, 1777. His own home, which he had built at 342 Main Street in 1770, was partially destroyed by fire. He resigned his colonelcy early in 1778. In 1781 his home served as a meeting place for George Washington and the French military leaders, the Comte de Rochambeau and the Marquis de la Fayette.

Before, during, and after the Revolutionary War, Cooke played an active role in the political and judicial aspects of local government. He settled in Danbury and from 1763 to 1783 represented the town in about thirty sessions of the general assembly. He was justice of the peace in 1764, served as judge of the probate court for Danbury district 1776 to 1813, was a member of the council of safety in 1778, and was a member of the Connecticut House of Representatives in 1776, 1778, 1780–1782, and 1784. He represented Connecticut in the Congress of the Confederation during its sixth session (November 1, 1784 – December 24, 1784 in Trenton, New Jersey, and January 11, 1785 – November 4, 1785 in New York, New York) and its ninth session (November 5, 1787 – October 21, 1788 in New York, New York). He served on the Connecticut Governor's Council in 1803 He also served as a judge of the Connecticut Supreme Court of Errors from 1784 to 1803.

He was interred in Danbury at the North Main Street Cemetery.
