= List of African-American cemeteries in New York =

This is a list of African-American Cemeteries in New York.

== Individual cemeteries ==
Cemetery name	County	City or Town
Cemetery of the Asbury Colored Peoples Church	Westchester	Harrison
Montgomery "Colored Cemetery"	Orange	Montgomery
African Burial Ground National Monument	New York County (Manhattan)	City of New York
Flatbush African Burial Ground	Kings (Brooklyn)	City of New York
Old Town of Flushing Burial Ground	Queens	City of New York
Harlem African Burial Ground	New York (Manhattan)	City of New York
Frederick Douglass Memorial Park	Richmond (Staten Island)	City of New York
Mount Moor African-American Cemetery	Rockland	West Nyack
Rye African American Cemetery	Westchester	Rye
New Paltz Rural Cemetery (segregated section)	Ulster	New Paltz
Newburgh Colored Burial Ground	Orange	Newburgh
Turkey Hill Colored Cemetery Milan, New York	Dutchess	Milan, New York

== See also ==
- List of African American cemeteries
