= North Burying Ground (Danbury, Connecticut) =

Coordinates: 41°24′15″N 73°27′36″W

North Burying Ground, also known as Old North Main Street Cemetery, is an historic cemetery in Danbury, Connecticut, United States.

In 2005, a 17-year old local resident cleared the burying ground's entry way, allowing for public access.

== Notable burials ==
- Joseph Platt Cooke, American military officer in the Revolutionary War, a Connecticut politician, and twice a delegate to the Congress of the Confederation
