= Flatbush African Burial Ground =

Cemetery in Brooklyn, New York

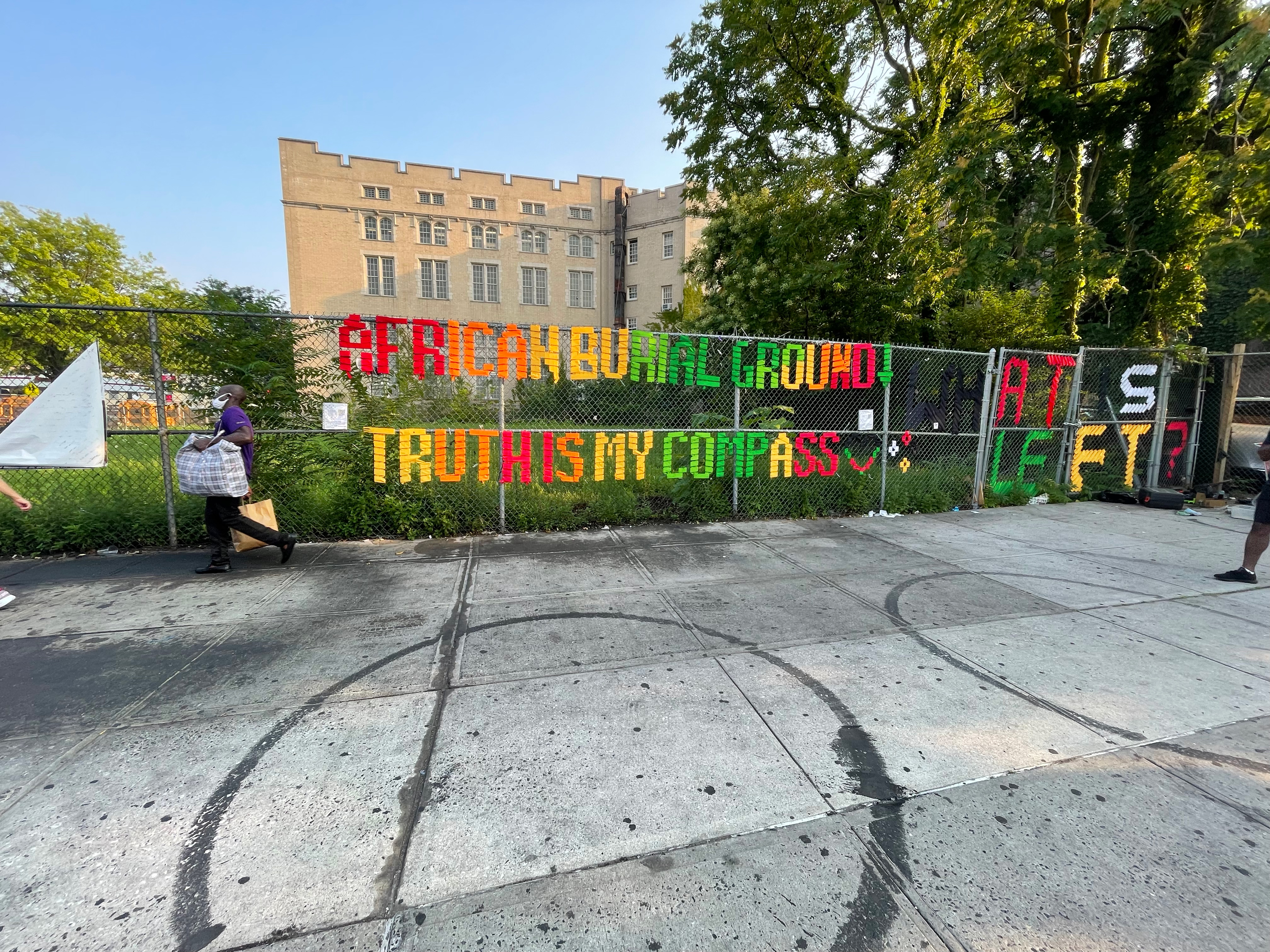
- A sign on a chainlink fence designating the Flatbush African Burial Ground site, 2021

- Location within New York City Location within New York Location within the United States
- Location: 2286 Church Avenue, Brooklyn, New York City, NY 10007
- Coordinates: 40°39′01″N 73°57′22″W

The Flatbush African Burial Ground or FABG is the site of a historic African-American cemetery dating to the 17th century at Church and Bedford Avenue in Brooklyn, on land formerly owned by the adjacent Flatbush Reformed Dutch Church.

== History ==
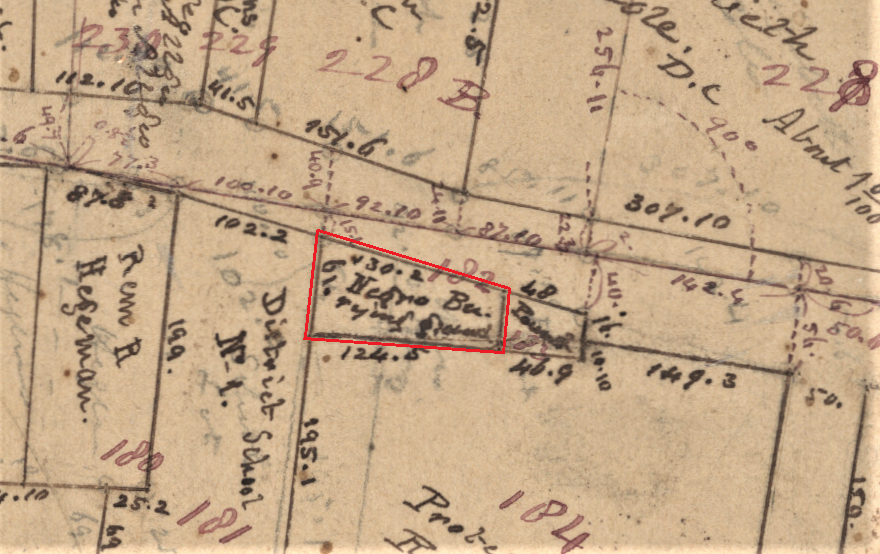
FABG area in T.G. Bergen map of 1855 Flatbush

Early Dutch settlers in the 1600s such as Leffert Pieterse, of the Lefferts family, owned enslaved people to work and use their agricultural knowledge to grow grain. Farming was central to Kings County, modern Brooklyn, as the second-largest provider of produce in the country to the end of the 1800s, and the burials of slaves and later free people of African descent were largely segregated from their owners or white neighbors in the cemetery of the Flatbush Dutch Reformed Church. Similar segregation of the Reformed Church burials in Harlem resulted in the Harlem African Burial Ground beneath the Metropolitan Transportation Authority's 126th Street Depot. The first national census in 1790 counted every third inhabitant of Kings County as black and recorded almost 60% of white households owning slaves, with the amount owning slaves higher in the town of Flatbush. Slavery in New York State was not fully abolished until 1827.

One of the earliest cartographic references to the Flatbush African Burial Ground is an 1855 map by Teunis G. Bergen, showing the "Negro Burying Ground" to the northeast of Erasmus Hall High School, which Bergen attended. John Y. Culyer's Flatbush District No. 1 School (later Public School 90) stood on a portion of the site from 1878 until 2015, when the city-designated landmark was demolished due to structural issues. The site has been slated for development by the New York City Department of Housing Preservation and Development, with a request for qualifications for contractors being released in January 2021 during the COVID-19 pandemic and ahead of online community workshops.

=== Known Burials ===
Phyllis Jacobs, born 1785, is recorded as being buried in the burial grounds in the late 1700s or early 1800. Her burial is mentioned in the book titled: A Historical Sketch of the Zabriske Homestead, Flatbush, LI written by Peter Shneck and published in 1881. In the book, Jacobs burial location is described as the Flatbush Burial Ground for "Colored People," East Broadway, Flatbush.

A 110-year old "negro woman named Eve" who was owned by Lawrence Voorhes, and previously Lawrence Ditmas for 80 years, was "piously interred in the African burying ground of the village of Flatbush, attended by a great concourse of the people of colour" on Sunday, March 25, 1810. She was described as of strong intellectual capacity, modest and unassuming, lively and cheerful, and enjoying an almost uninterrupted health as she worked during the summer months "by her own choice" in a garden which she delighted in.

== Gallery ==
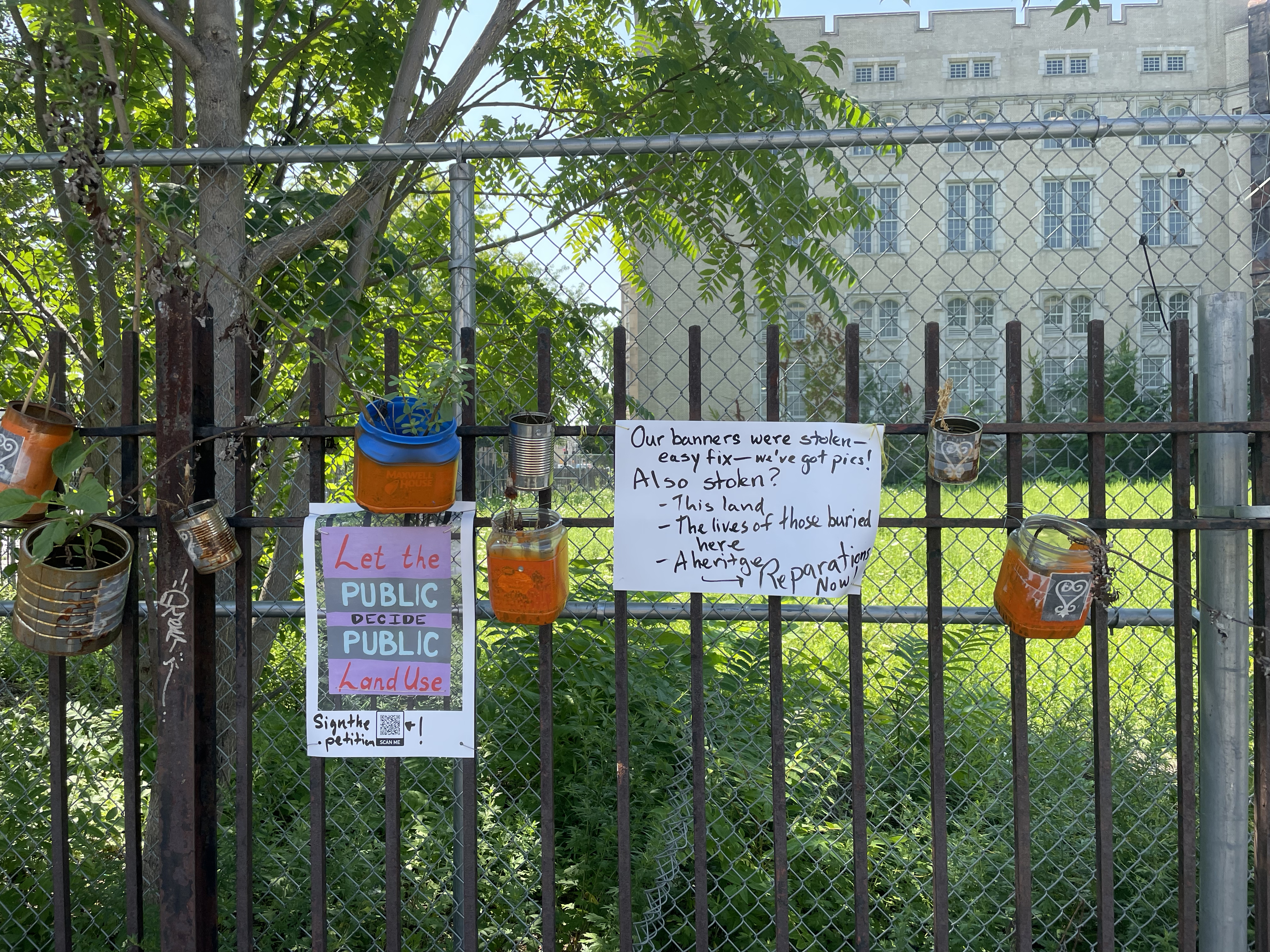
Signs and planters at the Flatbush African Burial Ground site, 2021

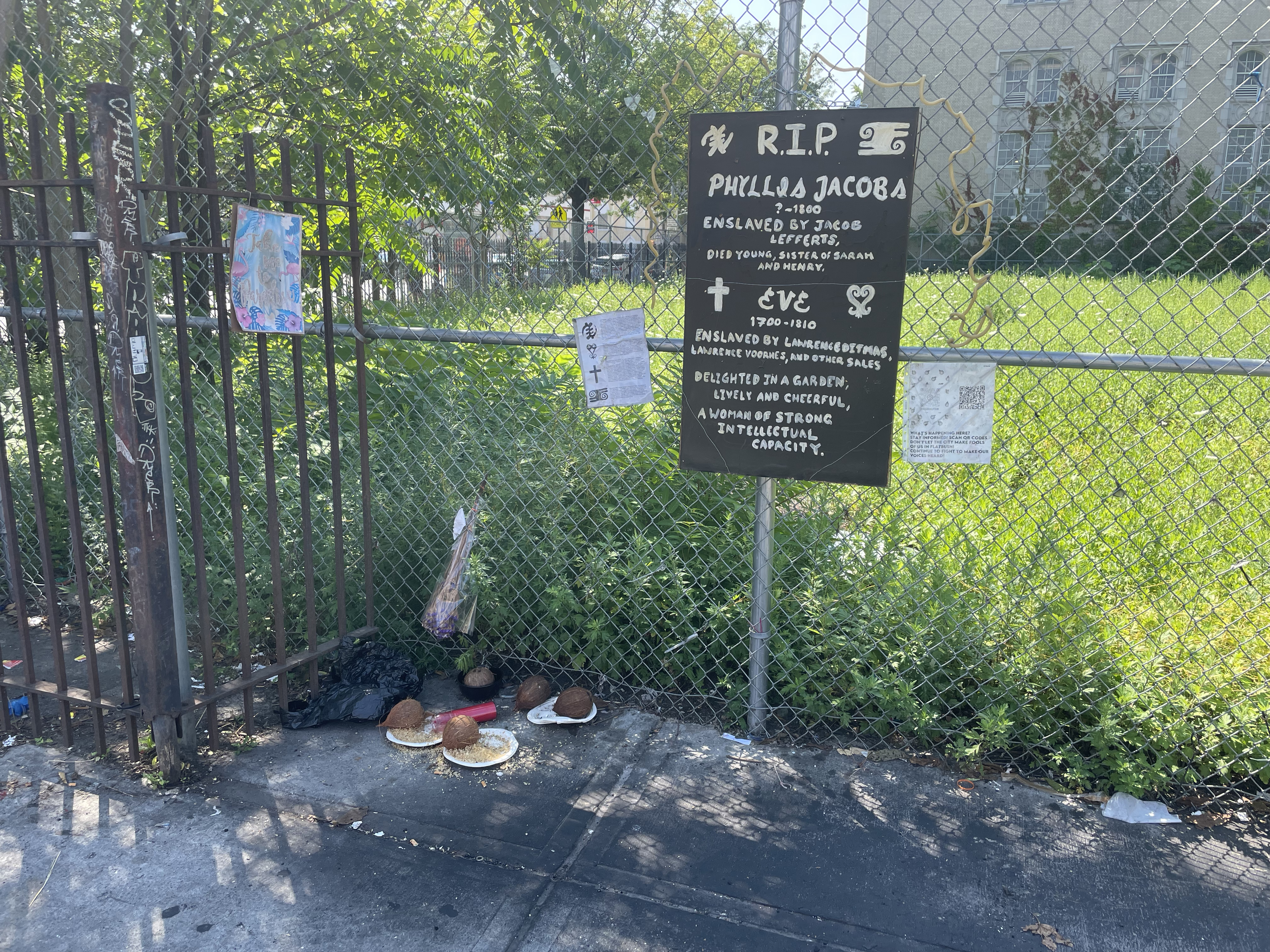
A hand painted sign at the FABG site, 2021

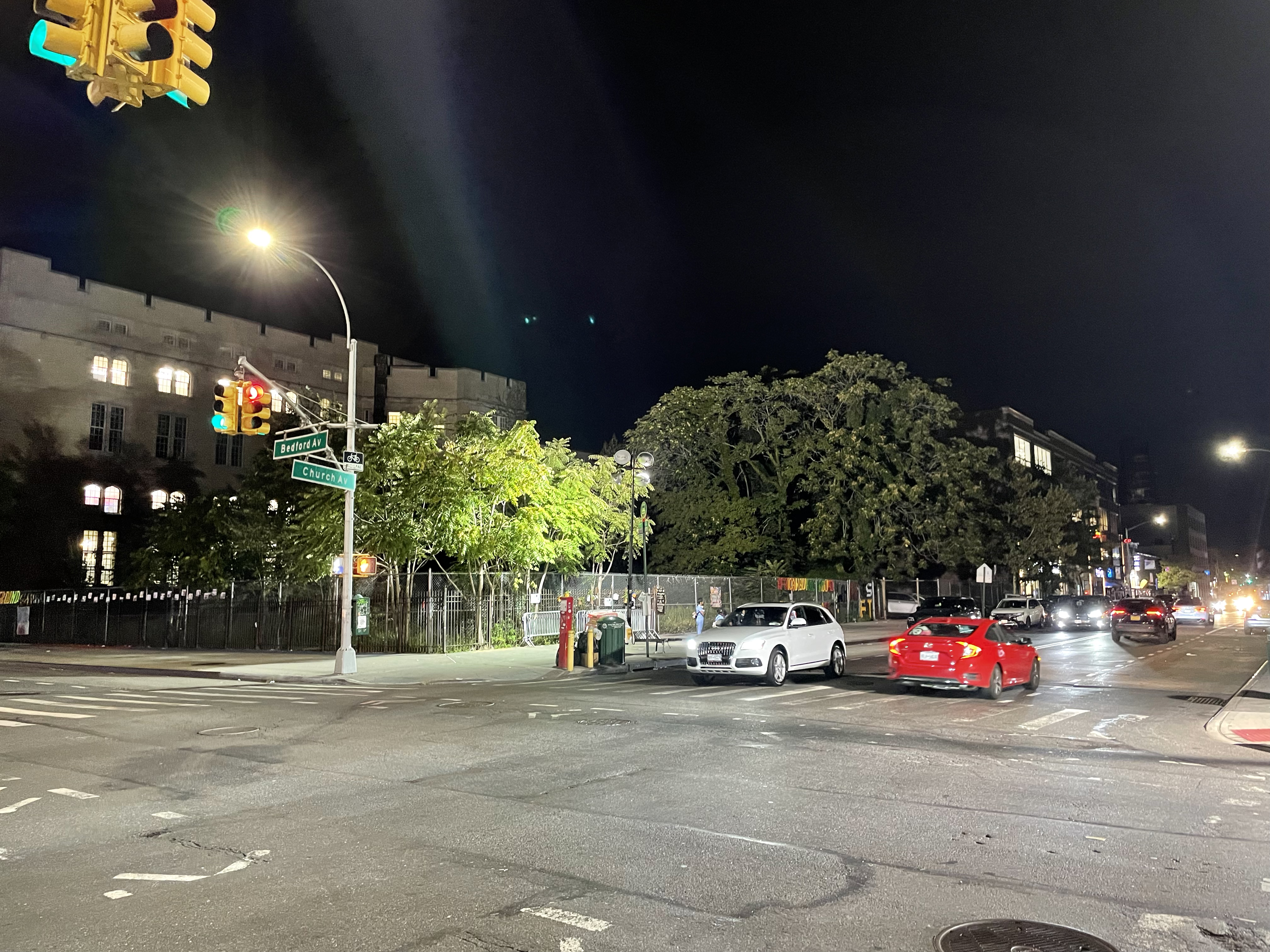
FABG site – the intersection of Church and Bedford at night, 2021

== See also ==
- African Burial Ground National Monument
