= Flatbush Reformed Dutch Church Complex =

Church in Brooklyn, New York

- U.S. National Register of Historic Places
- New York State Register of Historic Places
- New York City Landmark
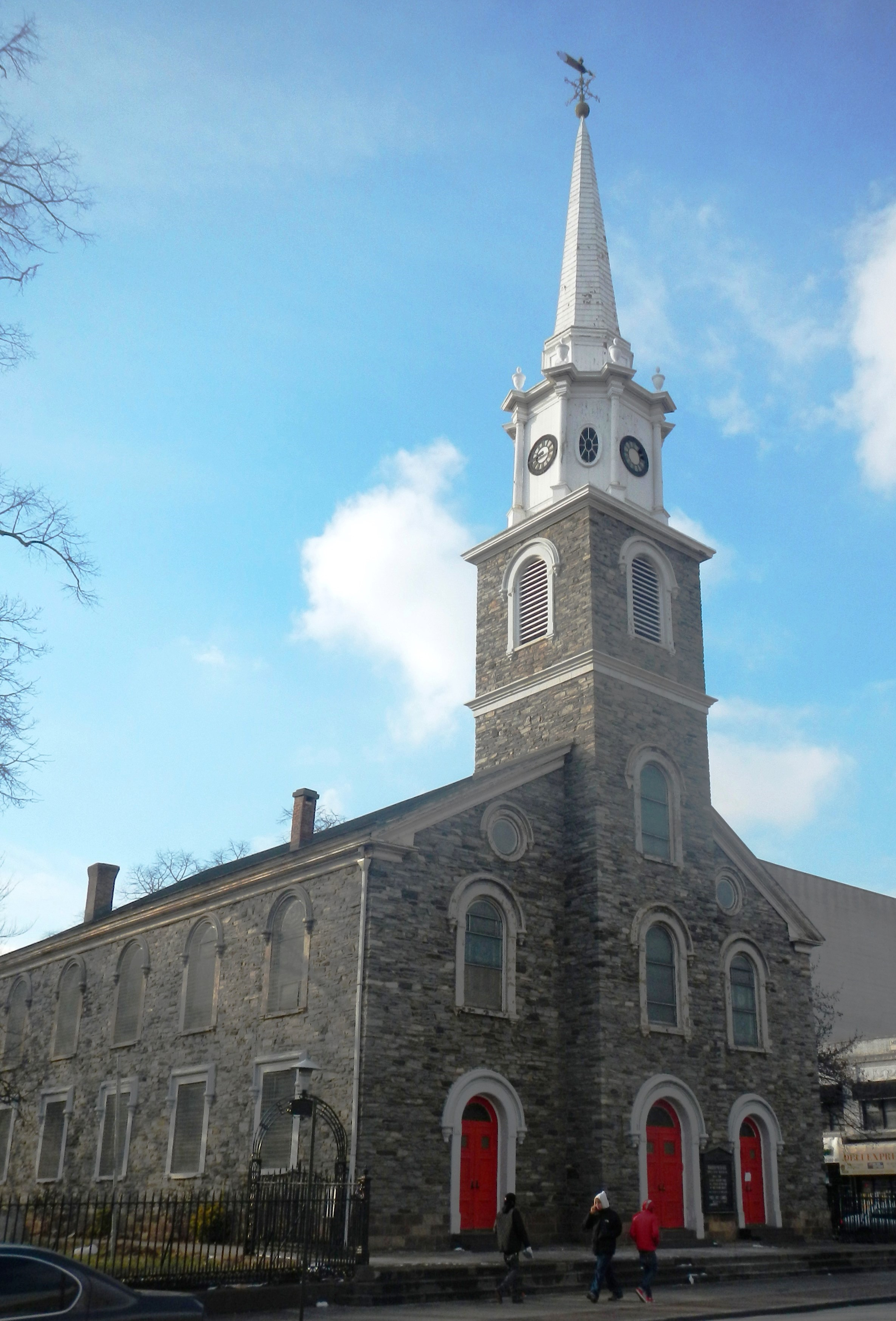
- (2013)

- Location within New York City Location within New York Location within the United States
- Location: 890 Flatbush Ave.Brooklyn, New York City
- Coordinates: 40°39′0″N 73°57′33″W
- Area: 2 acres (0.81 ha)
- Built: Church: 1793-98; Parsonage: 1853; Church House: 1923-24
- Architect: Church: Thomas Fardon; Church House: Meyer & Mathieu
- Architectural style: Church: Federal; Parsonage: Greek Revival / Italianate; Church House: Colonial Revival
- NRHP reference No.: 83001690
- NYSRHP No.: 04701.000016
- NYCL No.: 0170 (church); 1013 (parsonage)

Significant dates
- Added to NRHP: September 8, 1983
- Designated NYSRHP: August 9, 1983
- Designated NYCL: May 15, 1966; January 9, 1979 (expansion)

The Flatbush Reformed Protestant Dutch Church, also known as the Flatbush Reformed Church, is a historic Dutch Reformed church – now a member of the Reformed Church in America – at 890 Flatbush Avenue in the Flatbush neighborhood of Brooklyn, New York City. The church complex consists of the church, cemetery, parsonage and church house.

== History ==
The land on which the complex sits has been in continuous use for religious purposes longer than any other in New York City.

The congregation was founded in 1654 and the original church was built under the direction of Jan Gerritse Strijker at the order of Peter Stuyvesant. The 2.5-story stone Federal style church building designed by Thomas Fardon was constructed in 1793-98 and is the third church building on the site. It features a stone tower with stone belfry. The stained glass windows are by Tiffany studios and commemorate the descendants of many early settlers of Flatbush. The building was constructed of Manhattan schist, and the architecture includes Romanesque features such as arched windows and doors, as well as Tuscan colonettes. The church's bell was imported from Holland, and paid for by John Vanderbilt.

The bodies of American soldiers who died in the Battle of Long Island during the American War are reportedly buried underneath the church structure.

The cemetery is the last resting place for most of the founding families of Flatbush. The earliest legible grave marker dates to 1754. The 1853 parsonage is a 2.5-story wood-frame house designed in a vernacular style transitional between the Greek Revival and Italianate styles. It was moved to its present site at 2101-03 Kenmore Terrace in 1918. The church house is a 2.5-story red brick and limestone building designed by Meyers & Mathieu in the Colonial Revival style and erected in 1923–24.

The complex was initially designated a New York City Landmark in 1966, with the boundary expanded in 1979. It was listed on the National Register of Historic Places in 1983.

== Gallery ==
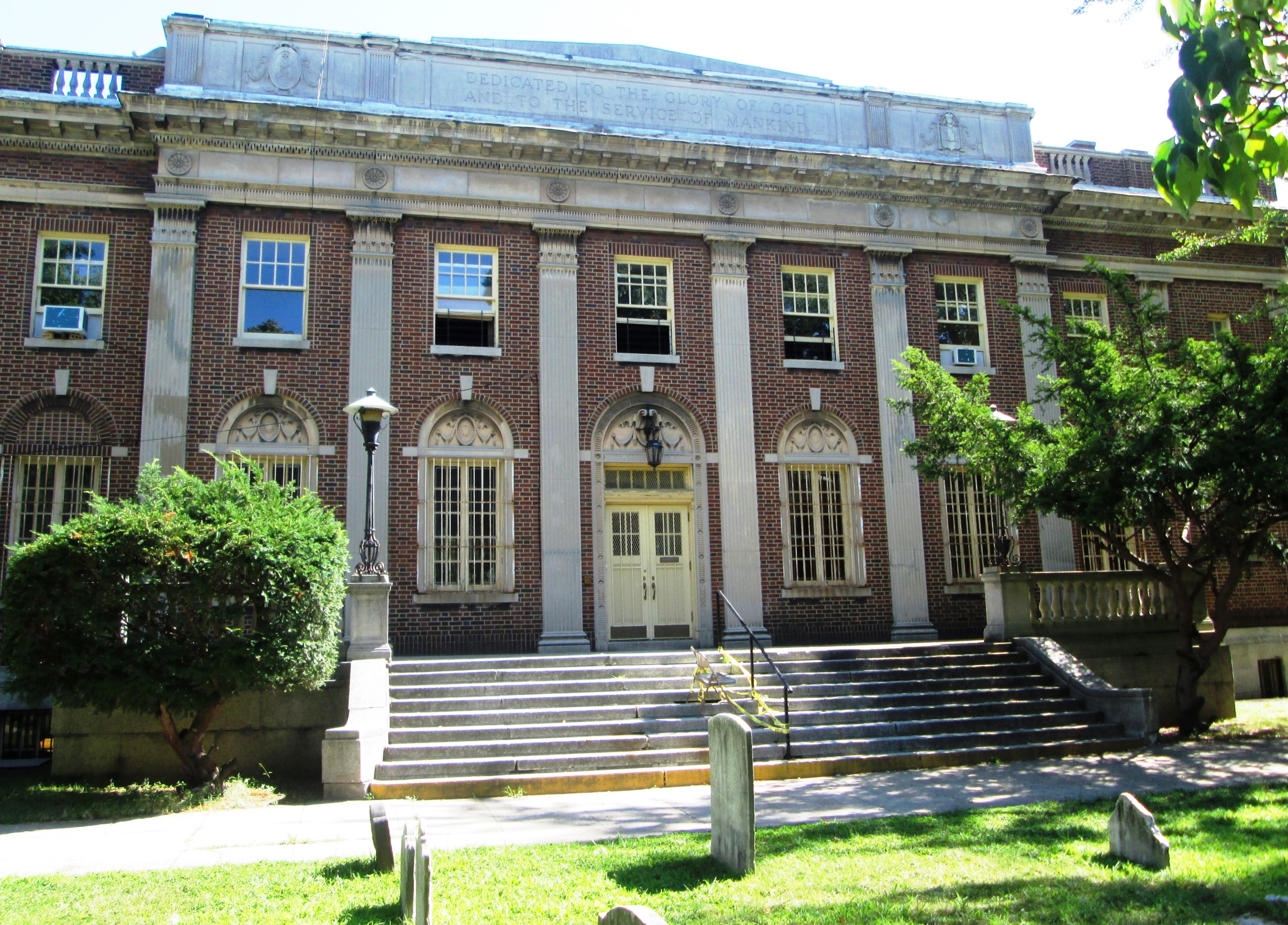
Church House

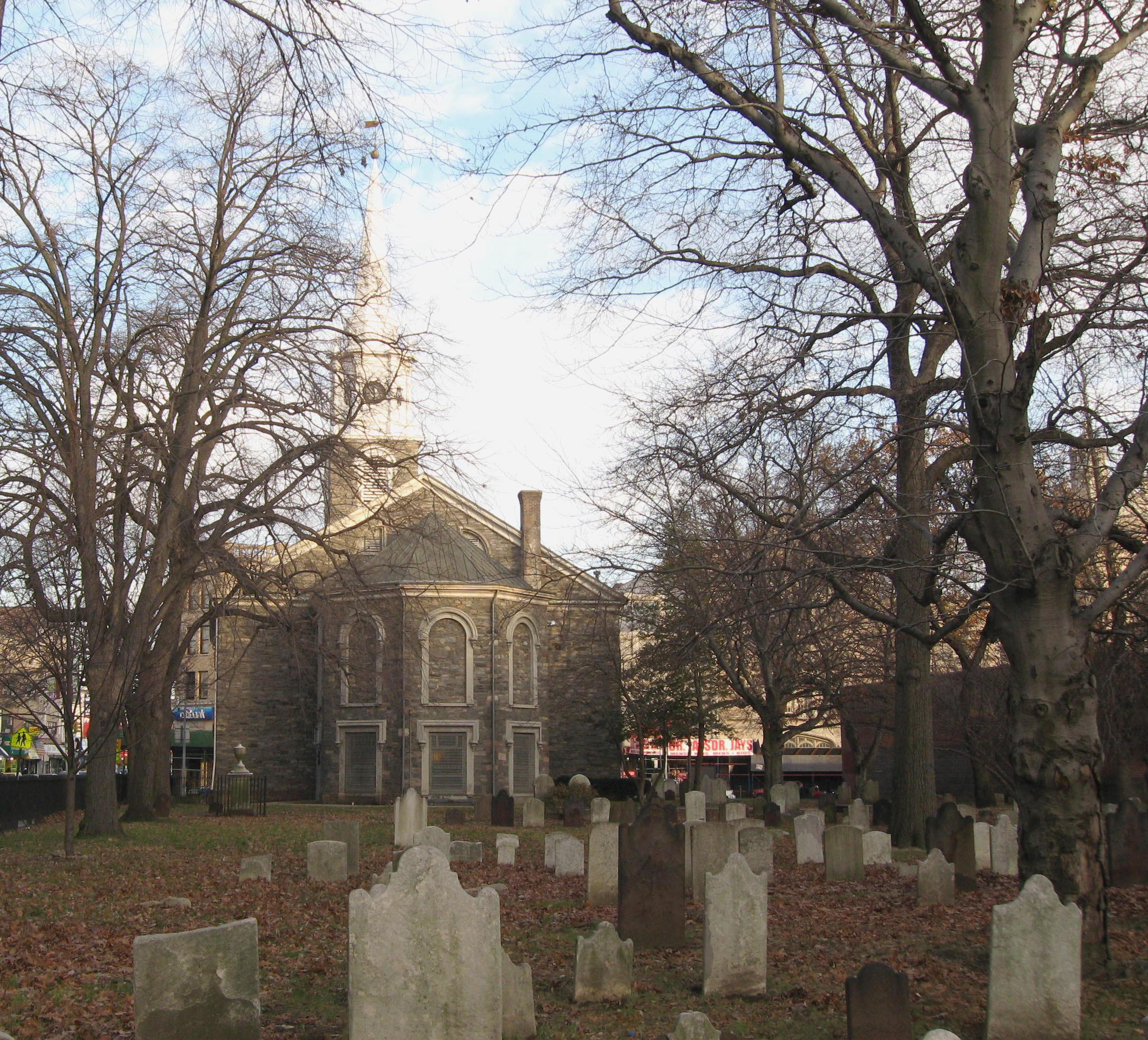
Cemetery

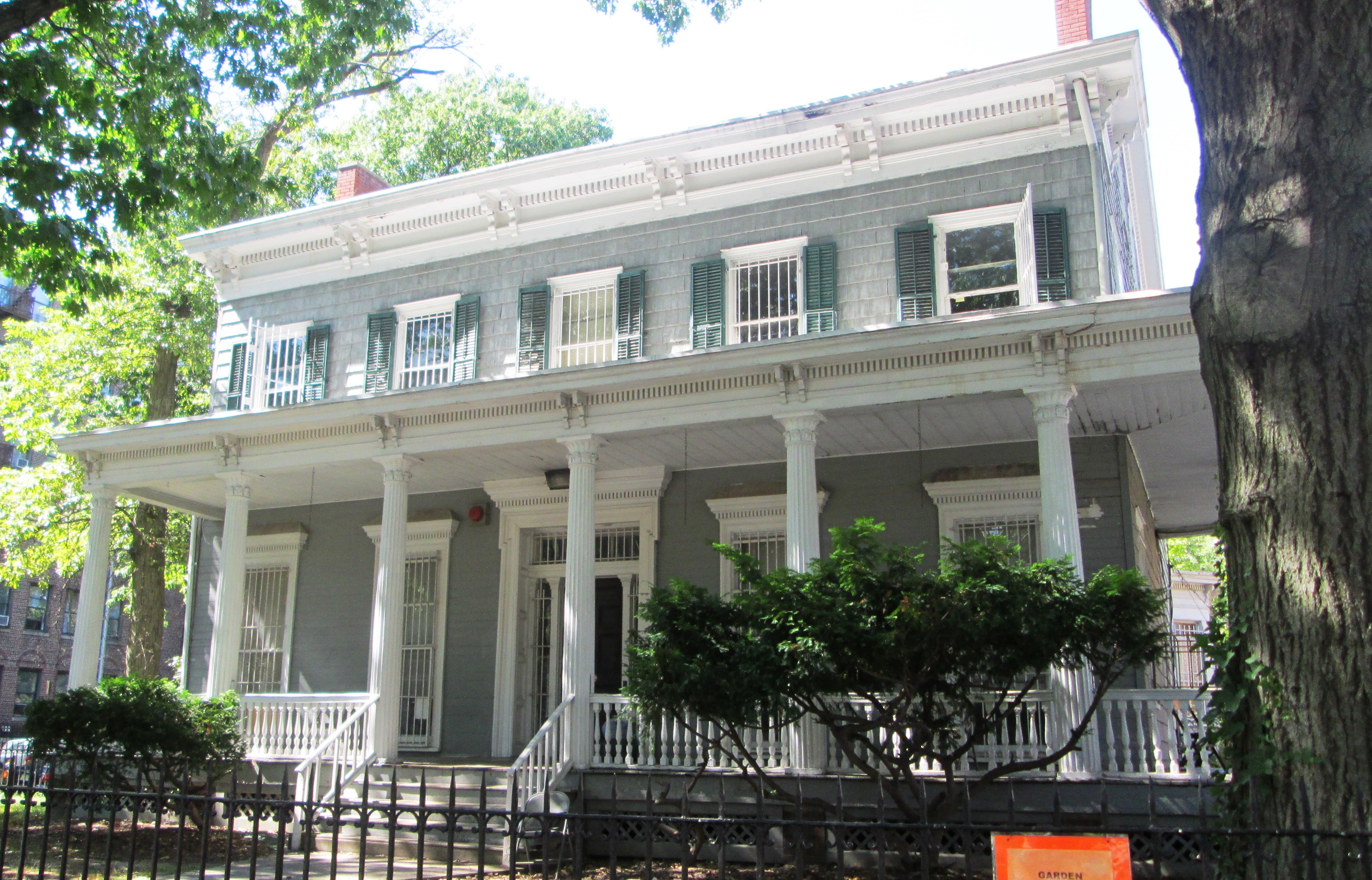
Parsonage

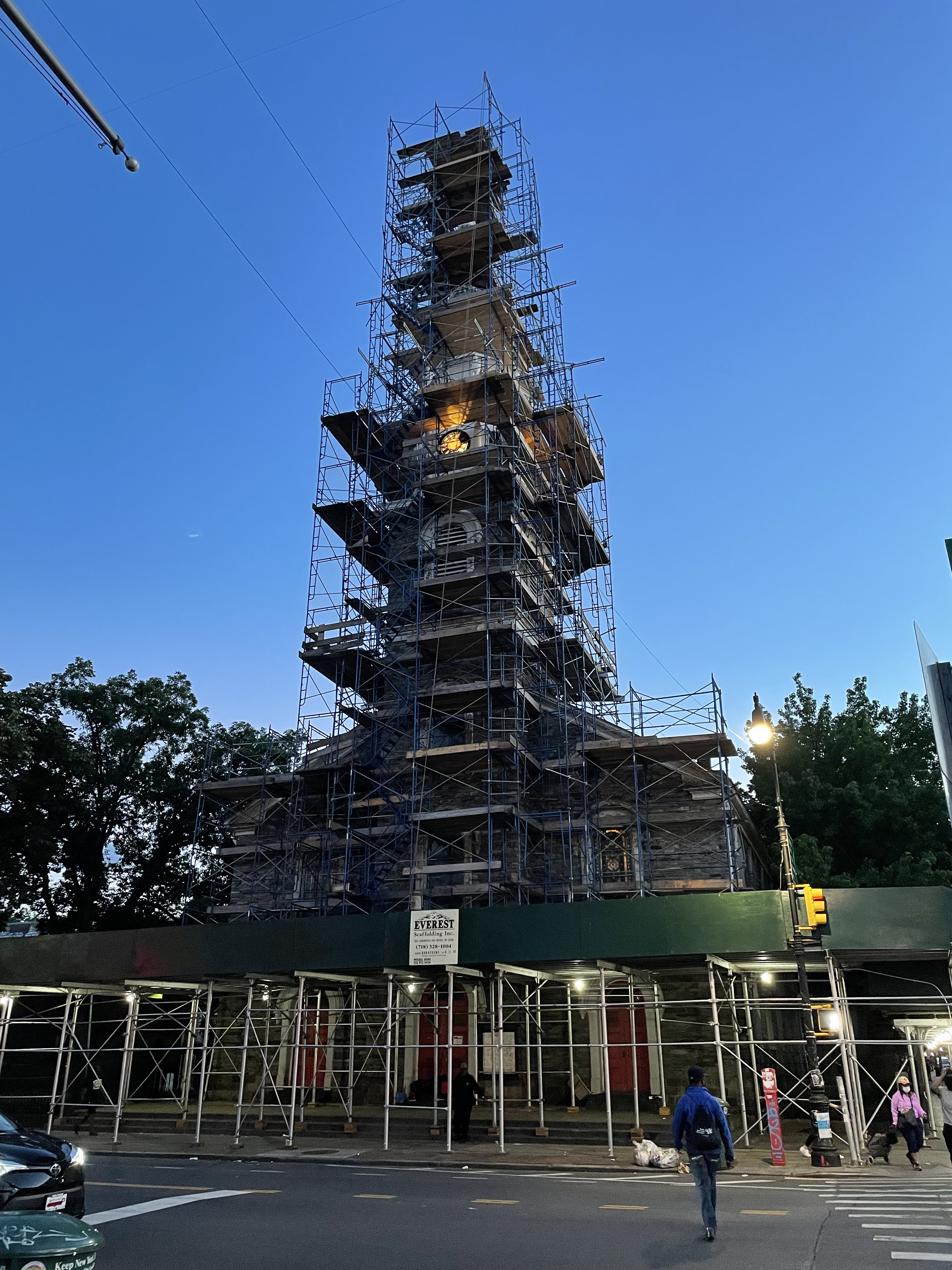
Undergoing repair work

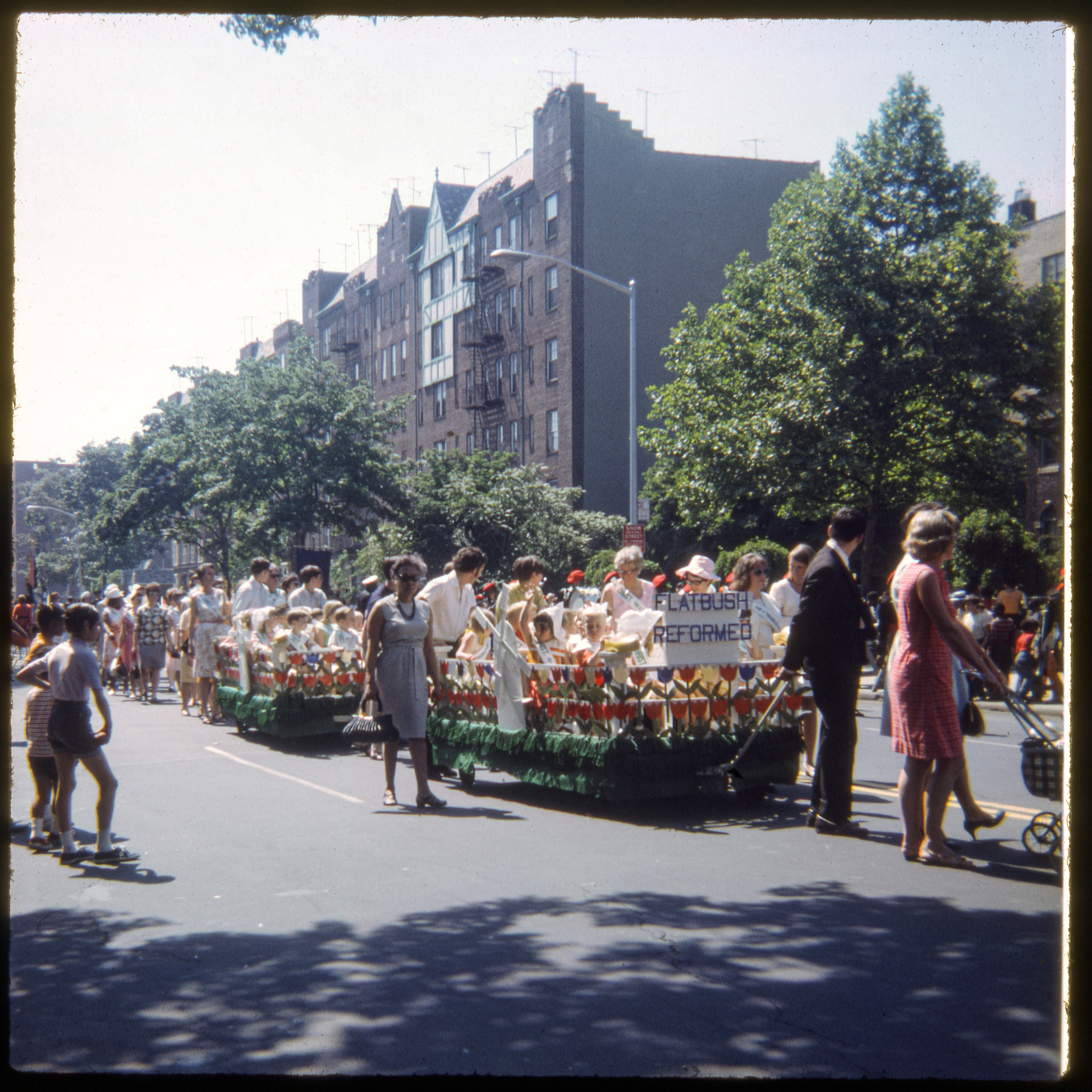
Flatbush Reformed members participating in a parade circa 1969 within Brooklyn, New York City

== See also ==
- Flatbush African Burial Ground
- List of New York City Landmarks
- National Register of Historic Places listings in Kings County, New York
