= Ninham (surname) =

Ninham is a town on the Isle of Wight. Ninham, or Nimham, is a surname. Notable people so named include:

- Abraham Nimham (1745–1778), Native American chief
- Barry Ninham (born 1936), Australian physicist
- Daniel Nimham (1726–1778), Native American chief
- Henry Ninham (1796–1874), English artist
  - John Ninham (c. 1754–1817), English artist profiled in his son's article
- Leigh Ninham (fl. 2003), Australian electoral candidate in Campbelltown
- Roger Ninham (1942–1985), Australian rower
- Sally Ninham (born 1969), Australian rower and historian

== See also ==
- Mount Nimham, in New York state, named after Daniel Nimham
- Ninham Shand, South African civil engineer known for:
  - Lesotho Highlands Water Project
  - Katse Dam
  - eponymous engineering consultancy merged into Aurecon
- Wampage I's child, Ninham-Wampage
