= Mount Nimham =

Mountain in New York, United States

- Location within New York Location within the United States

Highest point
- Elevation: 1,273 feet (388 m)
- Coordinates: 41°27′40″N 73°43′30″W

Geography
- Location: NW of Carmel, Putnam County, New York, U.S.
- Topo map: USGS Lake Carmel

Mount Nimham is a 1,273-foot-tall (388 m) mountain in Hudson Highlands of New York. It is located northwest of Carmel in Putnam County. Nimham Mountain is named after Chief Daniel Nimham of the Wappinger tribe. In 1940, an 82-foot-6-inch-tall (25.15 m) steel fire lookout tower was built on the mountain. The tower ceased fire lookout operations at the end of the 1988 fire lookout season and was officially closed the next year. The tower appears on the National Historic Lookout Register and is still open to the public.

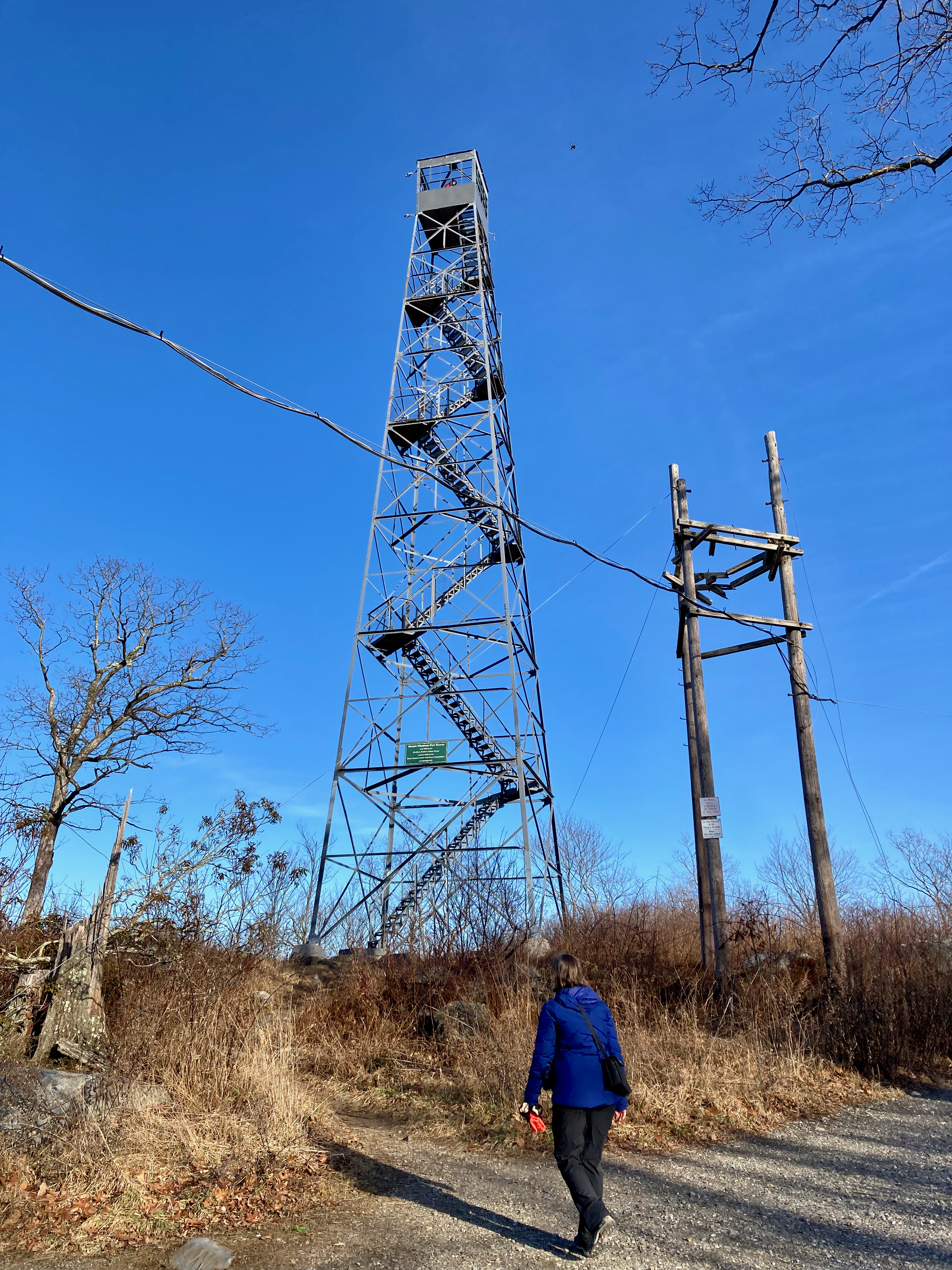
The fire tower in January 2022

== History ==
Nimham Mountain was named after Chief Daniel Nimham of the Wappinger tribe. The name was recently changed from "Ninham" to "Nimham" to correct a long-standing spelling error. In 1940, the Civilian Conservation Corps Camp P-135 of Peekskill constructed an 82-foot-6-inch-tall (25.15 m) International Derrick steel fire lookout tower on the mountain. The tower was first staffed for fire lookout purposes in 1941, reporting 73 fires and 266 visitors. Due to the increased use of aerial fire detection, the tower ceased fire lookout operations at the end of the 1988 fire lookout season. The tower was officially closed in early 1989 by the New York State Department of Environmental Conservation. In the mid-1990s, the town of Kent organized volunteers to restore the tower. The restoration work was completed in Spring 2005, with an official dedication ceremony on July 24, 2005. The tower appears on the National Historic Lookout Register; it is one of only a few towers in New York that still has the manufacturers identification tag, which reads: "THE INTERNATIONAL DERRICK & EQUIPMENT Company (IDECO) Columbus, Ohio - Los Angeles."
