= Liberty's Kids =

American animated historical fiction television series

- Genre: Historical fiction
- Created by: Kevin O'Donnell; Michael Maliani
- Developed by: Andy Heyward; Michael Maliani; Kevin O'Donnell; Robby London
- Written by: Doug McIntyre
- Directed by: Judy Reilly; Marsha Goodman Einstein; Pam Carter
- Voices of: Reo Jones; Chris Lundquist; Kathleen Barr; D. Kevin Williams; Walter Cronkite
- Theme music composer: Matthew Gerrard
- Opening theme: "Through My Own Eyes" performed by Aaron Carter and Kayla Hinkle
- Ending theme: "Through My Own Eyes" performed by Aaron Carter and Kayla Hinkle
- Composers: Eric Allaman; Stephen C. Marston; Craig Marks
- Country of origin: United States
- Original language: English
- No. of seasons: 1
- No. of episodes: 40

Production
- Executive producers: Andy Heyward; Michael Maliani; Robby London
- Producers: Kevin O'Donnell; Kaaren Brown
- Running time: 22 minutes
- Production companies: DIC Entertainment Corporation; WHYY-TV

Original release
- Network: PBS Kids
- Release: September 2, 2002 – April 4, 2003

Liberty's Kids (stylized on-screen as Liberty's Kids: Est. 1776) is an American animated historical fiction television series produced by DIC Entertainment Corporation and WHYY-TV, and originally aired on PBS Kids from September 2, 2002, to April 4, 2003, with reruns airing on most PBS stations until October 10, 2004.

The series was based on an idea by Kevin O'Donnell and developed for television by O'Donnell, Robby London, Mike Maliani, and Andy Heyward, initially under the name of Poor Richard's Almanac. It received two Daytime Emmy nominations in 2003 and 2004 for Outstanding Performer in an Animated Program (Walter Cronkite, playing Benjamin Franklin). Its purpose is to teach its viewers about the origins of the United States. Like the earlier cartoon mini-series This Is America, Charlie Brown, Liberty's Kids tells of young people in dramas surrounding the major events in the American Revolution and the American Revolutionary War.

The show features celebrity voice talents, such as CBS News anchorman Walter Cronkite (as Benjamin Franklin), Sylvester Stallone (as Paul Revere), Ben Stiller (as Thomas Jefferson), Billy Crystal (as John Adams), Annette Bening (as Abigail Adams), Dustin Hoffman (as Benedict Arnold), Michael Douglas (as Patrick Henry), Arnold Schwarzenegger (as Baron von Steuben), Liam Neeson (as John Paul Jones), Whoopi Goldberg (as Deborah Sampson), Charles Shaughnessy (as King George III), Michael York (as Admiral Lord Richard Howe), Don Francisco (as Bernardo de Gálvez), and Aaron Carter (as Joseph Plum Martin) who lend credence to characters critical to the forming of a free country, from the Boston Tea Party to the Constitutional Convention.

The episodes run a half-hour, including segments that include "The Liberty News Network" or LNN (a newscast delivered by Cronkite summarizing the events of the episode, with each including his trademark sign-off "that's the way it is"), "Mystery Guest" (a guessing game where the kids guess a historical figure, who often is a character in the episode), "Now and Then" (a segment comparing life in the Revolutionary Era and today), and "Continental Cartoons" (a rebus word guessing game). The LNN segment art was directed by designer Mike Bundlie. During syndicated airings, these are replaced by commercials.

== Plot ==
Benjamin Franklin and four fictional associates experience the American Revolution. Although the series spans 16 years from the Boston Tea Party in 1773 to the ratification of the U.S. Constitution and George Washington becoming the first U.S. president in 1789, no main characters appear to age much, except for Dr. Franklin.

== Characters ==
=== Fictional characters ===
- Sarah Phillips (Reo Jones) is a bright-eyed, red-headed teenage girl from England who travels to the Thirteen Colonies in 1773 at age 15 in search of her father, Major Phillips, who was last heard exploring the region of Ohio. Upon her arrival, she is warmly welcomed by and lives as a guest of Benjamin Franklin. Her mother, Lady Phillips, remains in England and is a good friend to Dr. Franklin. With the possibility of a war between the American colonists and England, she decides to become a reporter for Franklin's newspaper to offer a more balanced perspective to the press. Sarah believes firmly in the power of words, equal rights, and is not afraid to speak her mind. At the start of the series, she is a firm loyalist, which sparks many arguments between her and James. Later, Sarah realizes how much she has come to understand the people of the colonies and ends up supporting the Revolution. Some men know the way to her heart – good manners; James can seem almost jealous when this happens. Throughout the series, Sarah and James grow closer. At the end, her mother, Lady Phillips, joins Sarah and her father in the United States and Sarah hopes to explore more of her adopted country. She is the only character to appear in every episode.
- James Hiller (Chris Lundquist) is a 14-year-old (1773) American teenage colonist who works as an apprentice journalist for Franklin's newspaper. He holds a great deal of respect and admiration for Dr. Franklin and his works, particularly his invention of the lightning rod, as when he was an infant, his parents died in a fire caused by a lightning strike. Street-smart and impulsive, James pursues the revolution from a slightly one-sided perspective – something that prompts Sarah to counter his views. An apprentice in Franklin's Print Shop, James believes firmly in the American cause and will do almost anything to ensure the people receive an honest view of what is happening. In the process, he also faces the less positive aspects of the political conflict, which eventually forces his patriotic fervor into a new maturity. He highly values his friends, Sarah and Henri. He can be a little protective of Sarah while he attempts to keep Henri out of trouble, acting somewhat like an older brother figure to him. He is very laid-back and is constantly reminded of his bad etiquette and poor table manners by Sarah. At the end, James intends to start his own newspaper, following in the steps of his mentor.
- Henri Richard Maurice Dutoit LeFevbre (Kathleen Barr) is an energetic, rambunctious 8-year-old French boy (1773). He shares a similar tragic story as James; when he was 6 years old and still living in France, his parents made an agreement with a merchant for seven years of labor in exchange for passage to North America. However, three weeks into the voyage an illness broke out aboard the ship, killing half of those on board, including Henri's parents. The merchant decided to make Henri his cabin boy and treated him very cruelly, until James and Moses discovered him locked in a cage while collecting a new printer from the merchant. Together they smuggled Henri off the ship, and he found a home in Benjamin Franklin's workshop. While he speaks French fluently, Dr. Franklin has insisted that Henri learn to speak, read, and write in English and French. Henri's small size has proved more than useful to Sarah and James, though he has a tendency to land himself in all sorts of trouble while not fully understanding the dangers of the war. His lookout on life is that of a "huge party for his benefit" and he has been labeled a "magnet for trouble". In later episodes, he serves on the drum/bugle corps of the Continental Army. Curious and fearless, the only thing Henri values more than his freedom is finding a family. At the end, he returns to France with Marquis de Lafayette, whom he had become close to almost as a son. It is implied that Lafayette adopts Henri as his foster-son.
- Moses (D. Kevin Williams) was born in Africa, brought in chains to North America as a slave, and sold on the block in Charleston, South Carolina. Because of his ingenuity, Moses learned to read, forge metal, and buy his freedom, thus freeing himself from the slavery of the American south. To keep from being confused for a runaway slave, Moses is required to carry papers proving he is a free man. He eventually moved to Philadelphia and found work at Dr. Franklin's Print Shop. His brother, Cato, had not been so fortunate but later escaped, joining the British troops as a soldier to earn his freedom. Cato appears again when he does not tell on an African American Patriot spy, James Armistead, whose spying was crucial to the American victory at Yorktown, which ends the war for American independence. Moses looks out for Dr. Franklin's young wards, especially Henri. Like Henri, he values his freedom more than anything. Iron-willed Moses will never allow anyone to strip him of his dignity, despite his or her feelings on race. By working at the Print Shop, Moses hopes to educate children of all colors in the ideals of America so that everyone may one day be free. At the end, Moses reveals a plan to set up a school for free black children, but only to Dr. Franklin and Marquis de Lafayette. Cato goes to Canada with Mrs. Radcliffe, a British loyalist and friend of Sarah and her mother.

=== Historical characters depicted ===
==== Continental Army, Navy, and American militia ====
- George Washington (Cork Ramer)
- Major General William Alexander
- Colonel Ethan Allen
- Brigadier General George Rogers Clark (Norman Schwarzkopf)
- Major General Thomas Conway
- Margaret "Molly" Corbin
- Major General Horatio Gates
- Major General Nathanael Greene (John Michael Lee)
- Nathan Hale
- Alexander Hamilton (Andrew Rannells)
- Charles Lee
- Colonel John Jameson – appears in "Benedict Arnold"
- John Paul Jones (Liam Neeson)
- Tadeusz Kościuszko (John Michael Lee) – a Pole in Continental Army
- Colonel James Livingston
- Colonel John Laurens
- Captain John Parker
- John Paulding – appears in "Benedict Arnold"
- Joseph Plumb Martin (Aaron Carter)
- Israel Putnam – he appeared in the "Bunker Hill" and "The Turtle" episodes.
- Colonel Joseph Reed
- Deborah Samson aka Robert Shurtleff (Whoopi Goldberg)
- John Sullivan
- Benjamin Tallmadge – appears in "Benedict Arnold"
- Isaac Van Wart – appears in "Benedict Arnold", no lines
- Baron Friedrich Wilhelm von Steuben (Arnold Schwarzenegger) – a Prussian officer in the Continental army.
- David Williams – appears in "Benedict Arnold", no lines
- Anthony Wayne
- Udeny Wolf-Hutchinson (Carl Beck)
- Dr. Joseph Warren
- Samuel Prescott

==== British Army and Navy ====
- John André
- John Burgoyne
- Guy Carleton
- Henry Clinton
- General Charles Cornwallis
- Admiral Richard Howe (Michael York)
- General William Howe
- Richard Pearson
- Johann Rall – a Hessian officer in British service

==== French officers and politicians ====
- Marquis de Lafayette (Ben Beck)
- Comte de Rochambeau
- Johann de Kalb
- Admiral Comte de Grasse
- Comte de Vergennes (John Michael Lee)
- King Louis XVI of France – appears in "Allies at Last", no lines

==== Spanish Army ====
- Bernardo de Gálvez (Don Francisco), credited as Mario Kreutzberger

==== Native Americans ====
- Joseph Brant
- Cornstalk
- Abraham Nimham

==== Turncoats and spies ====
- Benedict Arnold (Dustin Hoffman)
- James Armistead
- Edward Bancroft
- John Honeyman
- Paul Wentworth

==== American family members ====
- Abigail Adams, wife of John Adams (Annette Bening)
- John Quincy Adams, older son of John Adams
- Thomas Adams, younger son of John Adams
- Peggy Shippen, wife of Benedict Arnold (Maria Shriver)

==== American politicians ====
- John Adams (Billy Crystal)
- Jonathan L. Austin – appears in "Allies at Last"
- Samuel Adams
- Samuel Chase
- Silas Deane
- Benjamin Franklin (Walter Cronkite)
- John Hancock
- Patrick Henry (Michael Douglas)
- John Jay
- Thomas Jefferson (Ben Stiller)
- Henry Laurens
- Richard Henry Lee
- James Madison (Warren Buffett)
- Caesar Rodney
- Edward Rutledge
- Luther Martin
- John Dickinson
- Charles Pinckney
- John Witherspoon

==== British politicians ====
- King George III of Great Britain (Charles Shaughnessy)
- Charles Fox
- Alexander Wedderburn
- Lord North

==== Other historical figures ====
- David Bushnell
- Elizabeth Freeman aka Mum Bett (Yolanda King)
- James Craik – appears in "Lafayette Arrives", no lines
- William Dawes
- Josiah Franklin – appears in "In Praise of Ben", no lines
- James Franklin
- Moses Michael Hays
- Edward Jenner
- Sybil Ludington (Kayla Hinkle)
- Thomas Paine
- Paul Revere (Sylvester Stallone)
- Theodore Sedgwick
- Benjamin West
- Phillis Wheatley

== Episodes ==
=== Series overview ===
Season	Episodes	Originally released	
Season	Episodes	First released	Last released
1	40	September 2, 2002	April 4, 2003

The following table contains all 40 episodes of Liberty's Kids, with links to relevant historical articles.

No.	Title	Dates	Written by	Subjects covered	Mystery guest	Original release date
1	"The Boston Tea Party"	1773 December 16	Doug McIntyre	Boston Tea Party	Samuel Adams	September 2, 2002
Sarah Phillips arrives in Boston aboard the Dartmouth. Moses, James, and Henri travel from Philadelphia to Boston to welcome Sarah but encounter a group of men dressed as Mohawks led by Sam Adams. He leads his gang of disguised patriots aboard the Dartmouth to dump crates of tea into the harbor. When British soldiers arrive, Moses takes Sarah, James, and Henri to meet Phillis Wheatley, who provides them with shelter for the night.
2	"The Intolerable Acts"	1774 March	Doug McIntyre	Intolerable Acts	Phillis Wheatley	September 3, 2002
In London, Weddebrun brings Dr. Ben Franklin to trial over his supposed involvement in the Boston Tea Party. Meanwhile, James, Sarah, Henri and Moses are stuck in Boston at the home of Phillis Wheatley as British troops arrive in large numbers and place the city under curfew. As the soldiers begin quartering in the homes of Bostonians, James and Henri hang posters all over town denouncing the Intolerable Acts.
3	"United We Stand"	1774 September	Larry B. Williams	First Continental Congress	Abigail Adams	September 4, 2002
Back in Philadelphia, John and Sam Adams visit The Pennsylvania Gazette where James clashes with John Adams over his defense of the soldiers involved in the Boston Massacre. John Adams tells James he must learn the difference between patriots and mob rule. Later, while covering the First Continental Congress, James witnesses a mob tar and feather a British sailor. Sarah travels to Boston with supplies for the resistance movement and meets Abigail Adams.
4	"Liberty or Death"	1775 March	Doug McIntyre	Give me Liberty or give me Death!	Patrick Henry	September 5, 2002
Having traveled to Virginia to buy a new printing press, Moses spots his brother, Cato, about to be sold into slavery and attempts to stop it. Meanwhile, Sarah and James listen to Patrick Henry's "Give me liberty or give me death!" speech at St. John's Church in Richmond. Henri, James, and Sarah race to rescue Moses after he is captured for trying to free his brother.
5	"Midnight Ride"	1775 April	Cliff MacGillivray and Kelly Ward	Midnight Ride of Paul Revere	Paul Revere	September 6, 2002
James and Sarah travel to Boston with a message from The Mechanics, a colonial intelligence network. They successfully meet with Dr. Joseph Warren and join Paul Revere and William Dawes on their midnight ride. After helping John Hancock and Sam Adams escape the British, James and Sarah stay up all night writing their story for the newspaper.
6	"The Shot Heard Round the World"	1775 April 19	Cliff MacGillivray and Kelly Ward	Battles of Lexington and Concord	John Parker	September 9, 2002
James and Sarah witness the Battles of Lexington and Concord from opposing sides, with James reporting under Captain John Parker and Sarah awaiting safely at the British camp. At North Bridge, a skirmish between British troops and American militiamen leaves many dead, including Sarah's cousin Tom Philips. Dr. Franklin arrives in Philadelphia, where Moses shows him the news stories James and Sarah have written about the brewing war.
7	"Green Mountain Boys"	1775 May	Jay Abramowitz	Capture of Fort Ticonderoga	Ethan Allen	September 10, 2002
The gang reads a newspaper article from the New Hampshire Grants written by a man named Ethan Allen. James, Sarah, and Henri travel to the Grants but are kidnapped by Allen and the Green Mountain Boys in Vermont. They watch the militia forcibly drive away a portly landowner, then stow away with Allen and Colonel Benedict Arnold during the mission to capture Fort Ticonderoga.
8	"The Second Continental Congress"	1775 May	Larry B. Williams	Second Continental Congress	John Hancock	September 11, 2002
A British spy named Paul Wentworth poses as a newspaper owner to convince James and Henri to divulge details from the closed sessions of the Second Continental Congress. Meanwhile, Dr. Franklin assigns Sarah and Moses to attend to the needs of Colonel George Washington and witness his selection as General of the Continental Army.
9	"Bunker Hill"	1775 June 17	Jim Fisher, Jim Staahl, and Robby London	Battle of Bunker Hill	Joseph Warren	September 12, 2002
James witnesses the Battle of Bunker Hill from the American camp, while Sarah searches the British camp looking for Lieutenant Hampton, a British soldier who served under her father, Major Samuel Phillips. In the aftermath, Sarah learns Lt. Hampton perished on the front lines. Dr. Joseph Warren is also killed in action, much to James's grief.
10	"Postmaster General Franklin"	1775 July	Bill Dial	Benjamin Franklin	John Adams	September 13, 2002
Sarah receives a letter from her mother in London, stating she has not received any letters from Sarah or Sarah's father in the Ohio wilderness. The gang uncovers a plot by the Royal Mail Service to intercept and confiscate letters from the colonies. James and Sarah attempt to deliver a batch of mail between Philadelphia and New York, meeting with a committee of correspondence along the way. Meanwhile, Dr. Franklin is appointed Postmaster General by the Second Continental Congress.
11	"Washington Takes Command"	1775 July	Jim McGrath	George Washington; Siege of Boston	George Washington	September 16, 2002
James, Sarah, and Henri spend 6 months with George Washington and his army outside Boston. During winter, James joins Colonel Henry Knox on his sojourn to Fort Ticonderoga to retrieve the heavy artillery confiscated from the British. General Washington uses the supplies and takes command of the army, lifting the British occupation of Boston.
12	"Common Sense"	1776 January	Elaine Zicree and Marc Zicree	Common Sense	Thomas Paine	September 17, 2002
Dr. Franklin's old protégé Thomas Paine comes by the print shop to ask them to anonymously print his pamphlet Common Sense, which makes the case for breaking away from Britain. James and Henri are inspired, but Sarah is repulsed by the notion of rebellion and refuses to read its contents. The whole city of Philadelphia soon reads the pamphlet, sparking widespread support and popularity for the American rebellion.
13	"The First Fourth of July"	1776 July	Brooks Wachtel	Declaration of Independence	Thomas Jefferson	September 18, 2002
James attempts to find out more about the debate over the Declaration; he rounds up delegates from New Jersey and Delaware. Meanwhile, Sarah goes through Thomas Jefferson's trash.
14	"New York, New York"	1776 July	Jim McGrath	New York and New Jersey campaign Battle of Long Island	Lord Stirling	September 19, 2002
Sarah visits Mrs. Radcliffe, a New York Loyalist. Meanwhile, James witnesses the loss of New York City to the British and Henri pretends to be an American spy.
15	"The Turtle"	1776 September	Bill Dial	Turtle; Attack on Eagle	David Bushnell	September 20, 2002
James, Sarah, and Henri travel to New York, where they encounter Admiral Lord Richard Howe's siege on New York Harbor. Hearing rumors of a sea monster within the harbor, the group stumbles across David Bushnell and his prototype submarine nicknamed "The Turtle". James and Henri assist in Bushnell's mission to detonate a bomb underneath HMS Eagle while Sarah tries to save the life of Sergeant Lee.
16	"One Life to Lose"	1776 September	Jay Abramowitz	Nathan Hale	Nathan Hale	September 23, 2002
The kids discover that Nathan Hale is a spy and witness his execution. Meanwhile, James is almost impressed into the British Navy and Franklin attends the Staten Island Peace Conference.
17	"Captain Molly"	1776 November	Cliff MacGillivray and Kelly Ward	Molly Corbin; Battle of Fort Washington	Margaret Corbin	September 24, 2002
Sarah encamps with Margaret Corbin at Fort Tryon, while James witnesses the loss of Forts Tryon and Washington to the British.
18	"American Crisis"	1776 December	Elaine Zicree and Marc Zicree	The American Crisis	Robert Bell	September 25, 2002
James and Sarah witness the terrible conditions of the Continental Army after defeats in New York and New Jersey and return to Philadelphia to help Thomas Paine publish The American Crisis.
19	"Across the Delaware"	1776 December	Jim McGrath	George Washington's crossing of the Delaware River; Battle of Trenton; Battle of Princeton	John Honeyman	September 26, 2002
James learns of a plan to attack the British before enlistments run out, then crosses the Delaware with Washington before the Battle of Trenton.
20	"An American in Paris"	1776 December	Bruce Franklin Singer	Benjamin Franklin in France; Forage War	Silas Deane; Alexander Hamilton	September 27, 2002
Franklin, now ambassador to France, works tirelessly to get military aid from the French foreign minister Vergennes. Meanwhile, James meets up with Capt. Alexander Hamilton on the way to Washington's winter encampment at Morristown, New Jersey, and Sarah contracts smallpox in Boston, recovering with the assistance of Abigail Adams in what is today Quincy, Massachusetts.
21	"Sybil Ludington"	1777 April	Jay Abramowitz	Sybil Ludington; Battle of Ridgefield	Sybil Ludington	September 30, 2002
James goes to Connecticut to learn of Colonel Henry Ludington and instead learns of the exploits of the "female Paul Revere". Meanwhile, Sarah is again with Benedict Arnold, and both witness the destruction of Danbury by the British.
22	"Lafayette Arrives"	1777 September	Michael A. Medlock	Marquis de Lafayette; Battle of Brandywine	Baron de Kalb	October 1, 2002
Lafayette arrives in Philadelphia and meets the kids before offering his services to the Continental Congress. He is later wounded at the Battle of Brandywine.
23	"The Hessians are Coming"	1777 June	Jim Fisher and Jim Staahl	Battles of Saratoga	Philip Schuyler	October 2, 2002
Both James and Sarah witness the Battle of Saratoga, Sarah from her coverage of Benedict Arnold and James from the vantage point of being tied to a Hessian deserter.
24	"Valley Forge"	1778 February	Marc and Elaine Zicree	Valley Forge; Conway Cabal	Baron von Steuben	October 3, 2002
James and Sarah see the hardship that Joseph Plumb Martin and other foot soldiers endure during the war. Washington faces a possible mutiny, while von Steuben drills Washington's troops.
25	"Allies at Last"	1778 February	Bruce Franklin Singer	Treaty of Alliance; Declaration of Loyalty	Jonathan L. Austin; Moses Michael Hays	October 4, 2002
In Passy, Franklin is able to negotiate a treaty of alliance and an audience with King Louis XVI. Meanwhile, James and Moses travel to Newport, Rhode Island and meet with Jewish merchant Moses Michael Hays while Sarah and Henri remain in occupied Philadelphia...and they hate it.
26	"Honor and Compromise"	1778 June	Cliff MacGillivray; Kelly Ward	Articles of Confederation; Battle of Monmouth	Henry Laurens; Abraham Nimham	November 4, 2002
The Continental Congress in York is divided among factions led by Richard Henry Lee and Samuel Chase. Meanwhile, Washington has to deal with opposition from General Charles Lee with regard to his battle strategy.
27	"The New Frontier"	1779 October	Jay Abramowitz	Cornstalk; Fort Wilson riot	Cornstalk	November 5, 2002
In Philadelphia, James encounters mob violence against James Wilson. Meanwhile, Sarah is on the Ohio frontier, where she encounters her father and Shawnee chief Cornstalk.
28	"Not Yet Begun to Fight"	1779 September	Brooks Wachtel	Battle of Flamborough Head	John Paul Jones	November 6, 2002
Shipwrecked on her way back to England, Sarah is rescued by the USS Bonhomme Richard and in the midst of battle, John Paul Jones helps her see that her true loyalty lies with America.
29	"The Great Galvez"	1780 March	Paul Diamond	Bernardo de Gálvez; Battle of Fort Charlotte	Bernardo de Galvez; Charles Fox	November 7, 2002
James is on the frontier, where he meets George Rogers Clark and Bernando de Galvez, the latter at the Battle of Fort Charlotte. Meanwhile, Sarah is in England, but it no longer feels like home.
30	"In Praise of Ben"	1780 April	Phil Harnage	Benjamin Franklin	Benjamin Franklin	November 8, 2002
When Sarah returns from England, she finds Henri fighting with a young boy. Henri explains that he has done this because the boy was saying bad things about Ben Franklin. The boy says he only said this because that is what his father said. Sarah, Moses and James explain to the boy and his father about Ben Franklin's life and inventions.
31	"Bostonians"	1780 June	Bruce Franklin Singer	Adams Family; Sullivan's Expedition	Joseph Brant	January 19, 2003
Sarah again visits the Adams family, when John is drafting the Massachusetts Constitution and preparing for a diplomatic mission to Europe. Meanwhile, James learns the horrors of the war for Native Americans from Iroquois chief Joseph Brant.
32	"Benedict Arnold"	1780 July	Jim Fisher; Jim Staahl	Benedict Arnold	Benedict Arnold	January 20, 2003
James is interviewing skinners when they capture British spy Andre, who is carrying blueprints of West Point. Finding out where he got them, James must later comfort Sarah when her friend, General Arnold, is unmasked as a traitor.
33	"Conflict in the South"	1781 January	Jim Fisher; Jim Staahl	Raid on Richmond; Southern theater of the American Revolutionary War	Nathanael Greene	January 21, 2003
James tags along with General Nathanael Greene on his campaign in the South. Meanwhile, Sarah is horrified when she finds out that Thomas Jefferson owns slaves. Thomas Jefferson admits that he does not like the fact.
34	"Deborah Samson: Soldier of the Revolution"	1781 July	Cliff MacGillivray; Kelly Ward	Deborah Samson; Battle of Rhode Island	Deborah Sampson; John Laurens	January 22, 2003
Sarah meets Deborah Samson, a female soldier who enlisted under the identity Robert Shurtleff. Meanwhile, General Washington attempts to organize an offensive with General Rochambeau from their base in Rhode Island and Vergennes attempts to organize a peace conference with the British.
35	"James Armistead"	1781 September	Jay Abramowitz	James Armistead	James Armistead	January 23, 2003
Encamped with Lafayette's army in Virginia, Henri enlists as a drummer boy and Sarah meets slave and double agent James Armistead. Meanwhile, General Washington prepares for a major offensive against the British.
36	"Yorktown"	1781 October	Jay Abramowitz	Siege of Yorktown	Charles Cornwallis	March 31, 2003
James and Sarah witness the epic battle of Yorktown. Meanwhile, Moses' brother may not get the freedom he was promised, since the British lost.
37	"Born Free and Equal"	1781 August	Bruce Franklin Singer	Mum Bett	Elizabeth Freeman	April 1, 2003
Sarah travels to the Berkshires and learns of Mum Bett, a slave who sues for her freedom and wins with help from attorney Theodore Sedgwick. Meanwhile, King George III is unwilling to admit that England has lost the war.
38	"The Man Who Wouldn't Be King"	1783 March, December	Jay Abramowitz	Treaty of Paris; Newburgh Conspiracy; George Washington's resignation as commander-in-chief	Benjamin West	April 2, 2003
When interviewing Washington, James learns that officers in the Continental Army want to overthrow the government and install Washington as monarch, something Washington finds abhorrent. The episode ends with Washington going to Annapolis and resigning his commission on December 23, 1783.
39	"Going Home"	1786 August	Jay Abramowitz	Shays' Rebellion	Daniel Shays	April 3, 2003
James visits Daniel Shays, who is upset about the conditions Revolutionary War veterans are facing and leads a rebellion to shut the government down. In New York, Sarah again visits her Loyalist friend Mrs. Radcliffe, who ends up moving to Canada with Moses' brother Cato. Meanwhile, James considers buying a newspaper, Henri decides to go to France with Lafayette and Franklin returns to America with Lady Phillips.
40	"We the People"	1787 May	Bruce Franklin Singer	Constitutional Convention	James Madison	April 4, 2003
James and Sarah attempt to find out what is going on at the Constitutional Convention, and Moses is upset that the United States Constitution does not abolish slavery. Benjamin Franklin predicts that it will take another war to end slavery. Meanwhile, Moses opens a school for African American children. The final scene takes place two years later with the first inauguration of George Washington as the first President of the United States.

== Development ==
The show was originally known as Poor Richard's Almanac when the series was first announced in October 2000.

== Broadcast ==
=== United States ===
The show was originally broadcast on PBS Kids and PBS from September 2, 2002 to April 4, 2003, with reruns airing on most PBS stations until October 10, 2004, a day before the launch of PBS Kids Go!. It later reran on Cookie Jar-branded blocks, including Cookie Jar Kids Network (formerly DIC Kids Network) on syndication from July 8, 2004 to August 29, 2009, again from September 25, 2010 to September 15, 2011, Cookie Jar Toons on This TV from September 5, 2009 to September 27, 2010, again from September 26, 2011 to September 28, 2012, and Cookie Jar TV on CBS from September 22, 2012 to September 21, 2013, so that those respective stations, CBS, and This TV, that broadcast the blocks, could fulfill FCC educational and informational requirements. The show also reran on The History Channel on July 4, 2008. In 2017, it played on Starz Kids & Family, and, until August 2019, regularly aired on Starz Encore Family. Until July 4, 2021, the series only aired as a series-long marathon on Independence Day on Starz Encore Family.

=== International ===
In 2005, it ran on Spacetoon in Arab League nations. This was the only other region to get the series other than Australia (where it aired on 9Go!).

== Home media releases ==
PBS Home Video released a VHS/DVD boxset of the series in 2003 for educational purposes. The boxset contained 20 VHS's/DVDs which each contained two episodes each. The boxsets also came with resource guides. PBS also released a 6-DVD boxset of the series.

On April 24, 2004, Ten-Strike Home Entertainment, a subsidiary of Bertelsmann, acquired exclusive North American distribution rights to the series. On June 29, 2004, to coincide with Independence Day, the company released three VHS/DVD volumes - The Boston Tea Party: The Movie, Give Me Liberty and The First Fourth of July, each containing three episodes, with the former being made in a feature-length format. The DVD version also came with an assortment of bonus features including a character guide, Historical Biographies and DVD-ROM features which are a printable coloring book and a web link. These releases were made for public use. A pamphlet inside the releases also confirmed that three more DVDs - Heroes and Traitors, American Battles and Daughters of the American Revolution would be released in September 2004, but they were unreleased.

In October 2008, Shout! Factory released Liberty's Kids: The Complete Series on DVD in Region 1. The 6-disc box set contains all 40 episodes of the series as well as several bonus features. This release has been discontinued and is out of print as Shout! Factory no longer has the distribution rights to the series.

In July 2013, Mill Creek Entertainment re-released Liberty's Kids: The Complete Series on DVD in a 4-disc set. Each disc contains 10 episodes each. Later in February 2017, Mill Creek Entertainment released Liberty's Kids: The Complete Series: Education Edition on DVD in Region 1. The 3-disc set contains all 40 episodes of the series as well as in-depth study guides for all episodes and activity pages.

== See also ==
- Founding Fathers of the United States
- List of television series and miniseries about the American Revolution
- List of films about the American Revolution
