= Daniel Nimham =

Wappinger leader

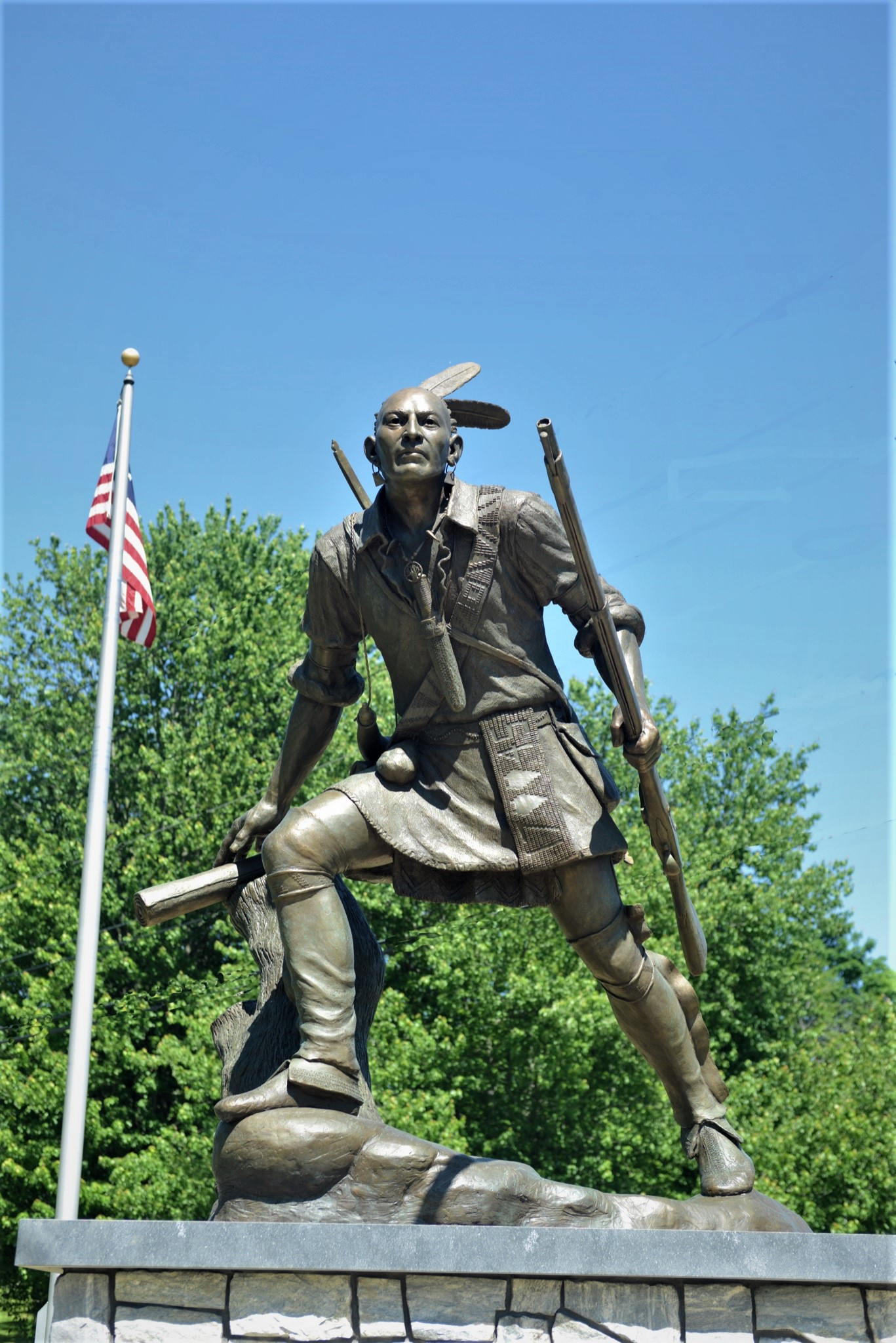
- A statue of Daniel Nimham located in the Town of Fishkill, New York, which was commissioned by the Town in 2021. Sculptor Michael Keropian
- Born: c. 1726
- Died: 1778 (aged 51–52)
- Children: Abraham

Daniel Nimham (also Ninham) (c. 1726 – 1778) was the last sachem of the Wappinger people and an American Revolutionary War combat veteran. He was the most prominent Native American of his time in the lower Hudson Valley.

== Background ==
Prior to Henry Hudson's arrival in 1609, the Wappinger People lived on the eastern shore of the today's Hudson River, a tidal estuary for some half its length. To them, it was the Muhheakantuck, "the river that flows both ways", and their territory spread from Manhattan Island north to the Roeliff Jansen Kill in Columbia County, and east as far as the Norwalk River in Fairfield County, Connecticut. The Wappinger were allied with the Mohican People to the north. Their settlements included camps along the major creeks and Hudson River tributaries with larger villages located where these streams met the river.

During the early period of European contact, the population of the Wappingers was in the thousands. The Wappinger band proper (one of a dozen or more bands in the Confederacy) are said to have occupied the highlands north of Anthony's Nose to Matteawan Creek (today's Fishkill Creek). Adriaen van der Donck, one of the earliest writers of this portion of the country, assigns them three villages on the Hudson; Keskistkonck, Pasquasheck and Nochpeems; but their principal village was Canopus, which was situated in a valley in Putnam county, and known as Canopus Hollow. To the Dutch and English they were known as the "River Indians" and the "Highland Indians". By 1700 the population of their entire Confederacy is estimated to have been reduced by disease and other causes to just 1000 individuals.

== History ==
Robert S. Grumet describes Daniel Nimham as the "leader of a small peripatetic group of from two hundred to three hundred displaced Mahican- and Munsee-speaking Indian people" who wandered the "mountainous contested borderlands separating Massachusetts, Connecticut, New York, New Jersey, and Pennsylvania. They built small bark houses and log cabins on sparsely settled lands in remote valleys far from colonial roads and towns, and made meager livings weaving baskets, crafting brooms and working seasonally as laborers or servants on nearby farms.

Daniel Nimham very likely learned to speak English from his father "One Shake” / Cornelius Nimham and at the Stockbridge Mission in Stockbridge, Mass., which the Wappinger had visited in the 1740s.

After 1746, Nimham’s residence was at Westenhuck, near Great Barrington, Massachusetts. In 1755, during King George's War, he, with most of his fighting men, traveled to Albany and entered the English service under Sir William Johnson, In 1756, the Nimham clan and around 200 Wappingers moved to the Stockbridge Mission, primarily to protect the older people, women and children. By March 1758, he was in Stockbridge, serving as town constable, although it appears he continued to frequent the ancestral lands around Wiccopee in Dutchess County, New York, and was claimed to make up until his death an annual pilgrimage up Mount Nimham in Kent in nearby Putnam County to survey all he claimed to still be Wappinger territory.

While there he was said to stay in an encampment described as "an area west of today's Boyd's Dam, at the southwest base of the mountain." This appears to correspond to the location of the last known settlement of Wappinger on their native soil, a small band living on a low tract of land by the side of a brook, under a high hill in the northern part of the Town of Kent as late as 1811.

== Land claims ==
In 1697, Adolphus Philipse, a wealthy New York City merchant and son of the first lord of Philipsburg Manor purchased land from two Dutch squatters, Jan Sybrandt (Seberinge) and Lambert Dorlandt. As they had never had a patent, Philips subsequently negotiated a confirmation deed with local representatives of the remaining Wappinger in which they renounced title to the land. Philipse claimed the deed set the Connecticut line as the patent's eastern border.

During the French and Indian War, the Wappingers or "Indians of the long reach" as that section of the river was called, furnished a corps of about three hundred, notably, to serve with Rogers' Rangers. They had moved their families to the Christian Indian mission settlement at Stockbridge, for the duration of the war. When the men returned, they found their land rented by the Philipses to tenant farmers.

While there is speculation that Daniel Nimham may have learned to speak English through the family of Catheryna Rombout Brett who lived in what is now the City of Beacon, New York, it was likely he learned to speak English through his father "One Shake" or Cornelius Nimham. Both One Shake and his brother Henry certainly could have actually played with Brett's children as they would have been the same age as Brett's children. However the Nimham's had already visited the Stockbridge Mission at Stockbridge, MA in the 1740s run by John Sergeant, and likely learned English there. Catherina was friends with the Nimham's and allowed Old Nimham, Daniel's paternal grandfather to stay on her land after it had been sold. Most historians suggest Daniel Nimham was born in the Fishkill Creek Region near the hamlet of Wiccopee, New York. Because of Nimham's multicultural skills, he went to court on several occasions to defend his people's land rights.

Nimham contested the validity of the Philipse's deed arguing with considerable justification that the Wappinger had been defrauded of their lands. The New York Council, dominated by manor lords, threw out Nimham's claim and jailed his legal advisor, Samuel Munrow, for "high misdemeanors". Undeterred, In 1766, Nimham and three Mohican chiefs: Jacob Cheeksaunkun, John Naunauphtaunk and Solomon Uhhaunauwaunmut from the Stockbridge area and three of their wives traveled to England to present his case to the royal Lords of Trade. The trip was financed largely by a combination of sympathetic rent rioters and land speculators. The London Chronicle describes the Nimham group of four chiefs as tall and strong, one being "six and a half feet without shoes...dressed in the Indian manner." Although he and his group were treated very well, he never had a meeting with the King directly (unlike the Four Mohawk Kings of half a century earlier), however he did speak with someone who was in the parliament who agreed to contact the governor in Albany, New York.

The Lords of Trade reported that there was sufficient cause to investigate "frauds and abuses of Indian lands...complained of in the American colonies, and in this colony in particular." And that, "the conduct of the lieutenant-governor and the council...does carry with it the colour of great prejudice and partiality, and of an intention to intimidate these Indians from prosecuting their claims." Upon a second hearing before New York Provincial Governor Sir Henry Moore and the Council, John Morin Scott argued that legal title to the land was only a secondary concern. Returning the land to the Indians would set an adverse precedent regarding other similar disputes.

== Stockbridge Militia ==
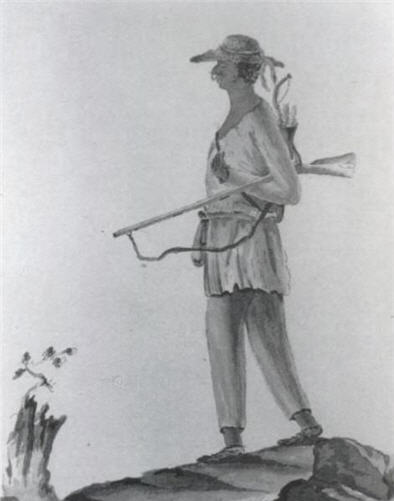
Johann Ewald sketch of a Stockbridge warrior

Daniel's son Abraham Nimham (born in 1745) was appointed captain of a company of Indian scouts serving with the Continental Army, a confederacy of Mohicans, Wappingers, Munsee and other local tribes (referred to as the Stockbridge Militia) by General George Washington.

Daniel and Abraham Nimham and his fellow Stockbridge warriors fought for the American cause during the Revolutionary War and were some of America's first Veterans. They served with Washington at Valley Forge and later with General Marquis de Lafayette's troops. It is noted that Daniel "faithfully served in the army as a soldier at Cambridge...In 1775 ".

On August 31, 1778, fifty Stockbridge Militia led by Nimham were attacked by the Queen's Rangers, a Loyalist military unit led by Lt. Colonel John Graves Simcoe in the Battle of Kingsbridge. The battle took place in what is now Van Cortlandt Park in the Bronx. A stone monument to the Stockbridge Militia who died during the battle marks a trail to the battlefield.

Mohican Sachem Hendrick Aupaumut and others of the tribe petitioned the General Court for compensation for the losses at the Battle of Kingsbridge, dated September 22, 1778. "Our young men have been employed in the present War against the common Enemy and many have lately fell in Battle. Their Widows are now left to care of themselves and their children; without help from their husbands, who at this season of the year provided for their families by hunting. We Indians depend on hunting to clothe ourselves and families. But when we get skins we know not where to go to trade for clothing. We are not able to make any ourselves. Our way of living is very different from our English breathren. And by this, we the subscribers, in behalf of our Tribe now earnestly pray you to consider our circumstances, and open your hearts, by providing such way by which we may be able to procure some coarse cloathing particularly Blankets."

By the early 1800s, many of the local native people from Stockbridge had joined the Oneida Nation in New York, eventually journeying west to Ontario and Wisconsin.

== Legacy ==
- In 1906, the Mount Vernon, New York Chapter of the Daughters of the American Revolution dedicated the Chief Nimham Memorial at Van Cortlandt Park in the Bronx, New York.
- In 1937 a bronze plaque was dedicated to the Sachem Daniel Nimham. The plaque was mounted to a boulder. Sculptor Michael Keropian removed the bronze plaque and had it refurbished. He then added it to the new base for the 8' sculpture dedicated in Fishkill, NY on June 11, 2022.
- Nimham Mountain, which rises to 1,260' in the town of Kent, Putnam County, New York, of NYS Route 41 is named after him.
- Lake Nimham in the town of Kent is named after him.
- The Nimham Mountain Fire Tower, an 83' tall historic steel tower atop Nimham Mountain is named after him.
- A marker on Gypsy Trail Road at the entrance to the park reads "Named in honor of the Sachem Daniel Nimham of Wappinger Indians killed in 1778 while fighting at Kings Bridge with our American Forces" and is dated 1932.
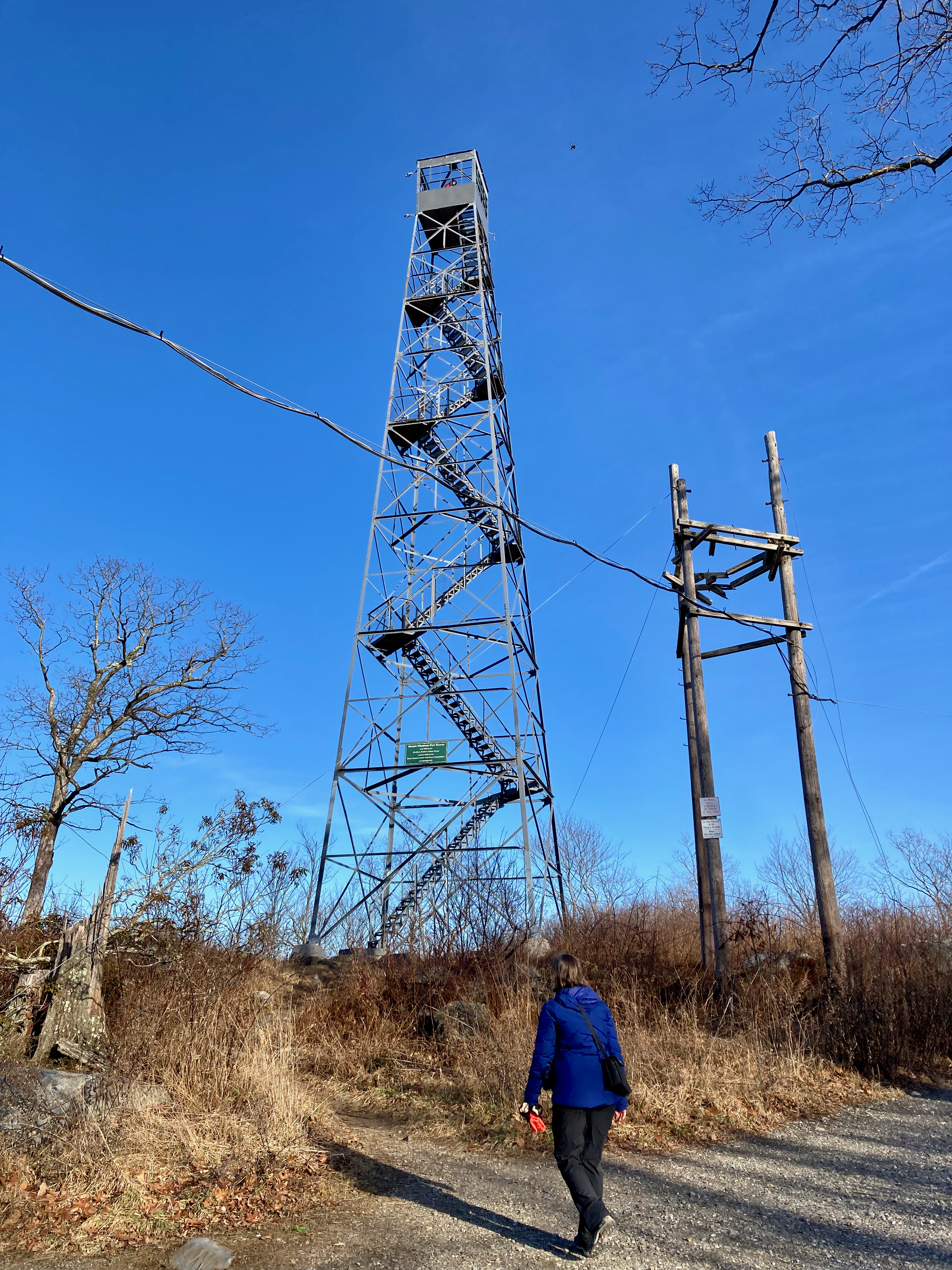
  Ninham mountain fire tower, Carmel, New York
- In 1932, the New York State Education Department erected an historical marker in Kent on Route 301 to commemorate Nimham.(41° 28.312′ N, 73° 45.612′ W.) A second marker was erected in 1937 at the intersection of State Route 52 and 82 in Fishkill.(41° 32.685′ N, 73° 52.16′ W.)
- New York State's Nimham Mountain Multiple Use Area was established in the town of Kent. The 1,054-acre property has an extensive network of trails and old roads and is popular with bikers, hikers and horseback riders.
- Starting in 2001 the Annual Daniel Nimham Intertribal Pow Wow was held in Putnam County in his honor. Members of tribes from all over the Northeast came and engaged in intertribal dancing and other rituals. The event was open to the public.
- Area sculptor Michael Keropian has created an 8' scale bronze sculpture dedicated to Sachem Daniel Nimham for the Town of Fishkill, New York.
- In 2021, the Nimham Trail opened as an alternate route for hikers climbing Breakneck Ridge in Hudson Highlands State Park.
- In 2022, the Town of Fishkill dedicated an eight-foot bronze statue by sculptor Michael Keropian, commissioned by the Town for installation at the Arrowhead intersection of NY-52 and NY-82 where a memorial plaque has stood since 1937. Town Supervisor Ozzy Albra hosted the ceremony which featured comments from elected officials, educators, the sculptor, and a number of special presentations by Native American community groups.
- There has been some question and confusion as to the spelling of Daniel Nimham's name. In the majority of deeds and records Daniel Nimham's last name has always been spelled with a "m" in the middle. His grandfather was called Nimhammaw (circa 1647). When the remaining Nimham's moved west to Oneida in the 1800s, their language changed from speaking Algonquin to Iroquoian. The latter language doesn't use the "m" in the middle of a word, so the Nimham name changed to Ninham. Since this is the language of the Stockbridge Munsee Mohican Community they naturally spell Nimham, Ninham with an 'n' in the middle. Where this can be confusing is in work on ancestry and research, where for example there are numerous Daniel, Henry, Aaron's Ninham's etc.
