= Sally Ninham =

Australian historian and rower

Personal information
- Full name: Sally Edna Ninham
- Nickname: Sal
- Nationality: Australian
- Born: 1969 (age 56–57) Maryland, USA

Sport
- Country: Australia
- Sport: Rowing
- Club: ANU Boat Club; Melbourne University Boat Club
Medal record
Women's rowing
Representing Australia
World Rowing Championships
Silver medal – second place	1990 Lake Barrington	LW4-

Sally Ninham is an Australian historian and a former national representative rower. As a lightweight rower she was a national champion and won a silver medal at the 1990 World Rowing Championships.

== Early life and education ==
Ninham was born in 1969 in the United States and grew up in Cook, Australian Capital Territory with her three brothers. She attended Cook Primary School, Campbell High School and Hawker College. She is the fourth child of Professor Barry William Ninham.

Sally Ninham studied at the Australian National University and La Trobe University, in Germany at the University of Hamburg and she undertook some studies at the University of California Berkeley. She obtained a BA (Hons) and a PhD.

== Rowing career ==
=== Rowing pedigree ===
Sally Ninham's grandfather William Charles Ninham was a master boat builder and stroked South Australian eights which contested the King's Cup in 1932, 1933 and 1935. Her great uncle Robert Maxwell Ninham rowed in that SA King's Cup eight of 1935 and was the South Australian entrant in the single scull contesting the President's Cup in 1938. Sally's uncle Roger Ninham rowed for Western Australia, New South Wales and was a dual Olympian - rowing at Rome 1960 and Tokyo 1964. Her uncle Darrell represented for Western Australia as a coxswain and her own father Barry stroked University of Western Australia eights at Australian University Championships.

=== Club and state rowing ===
Sally Ninham's senior club rowing was from the Australian National University Boat Club and the Melbourne University Boat Club. She won a New South Wales state championship title in 1989 in a lightweight coxless four.

She contested national titles at the Australian Rowing Championships in the lightweight pair and the lightweight coxless four on a number of occasions. In 1989 in ANU colours she placed second in the pair and in the four. In 1990, racing for MUBC she placed fifth in the pair and fourth in the four.

Ninham's sole state representation for Victoria came in 1990 when she was selected in the bow seat of the lightweight coxless four which contested and won the Victoria Cup at the Interstate Regatta within the Australian Rowing Championships.

=== International representative rowing ===
Ninham made her Australian representative debut in 1989 in the lightweight coxless four. They raced at the Lucerne International Regatta to a fourth place and then at the 1989 World Rowing Championships in Bled they again finished fourth. The following year at the 1990 World Rowing Championships in Lake Barrington, Ninham held the three seat in the women's lightweight four which won the silver medal. That same crew also raced that year at the 1990 Canadian Henley Regatta and won the lightweight coxless four title.

== Academic and business career ==
=== Scholar and author ===
An independent scholar and author affiliated with Melbourne's La Trobe University, her first published work was A Cohort of Pioneers, a study on Australia's growing intellectual, social, and research cultures since World War II. Her second book Ten African Cardinals tracked conversations with ten of the fourteen African cardinals of the Roman Catholic Church. The research for this she did in Africa, with her son.

=== Business ===
Ninham owns a ceramic studio, that runs classes.

== Personal ==
Ninham is married to James Peters, a national Australian champion lightweight rower (1981 coxless four), who also coached at the Australian national level. They have five children.
