= Moses Michael Hays =

American banker, merchant, and philanthropist

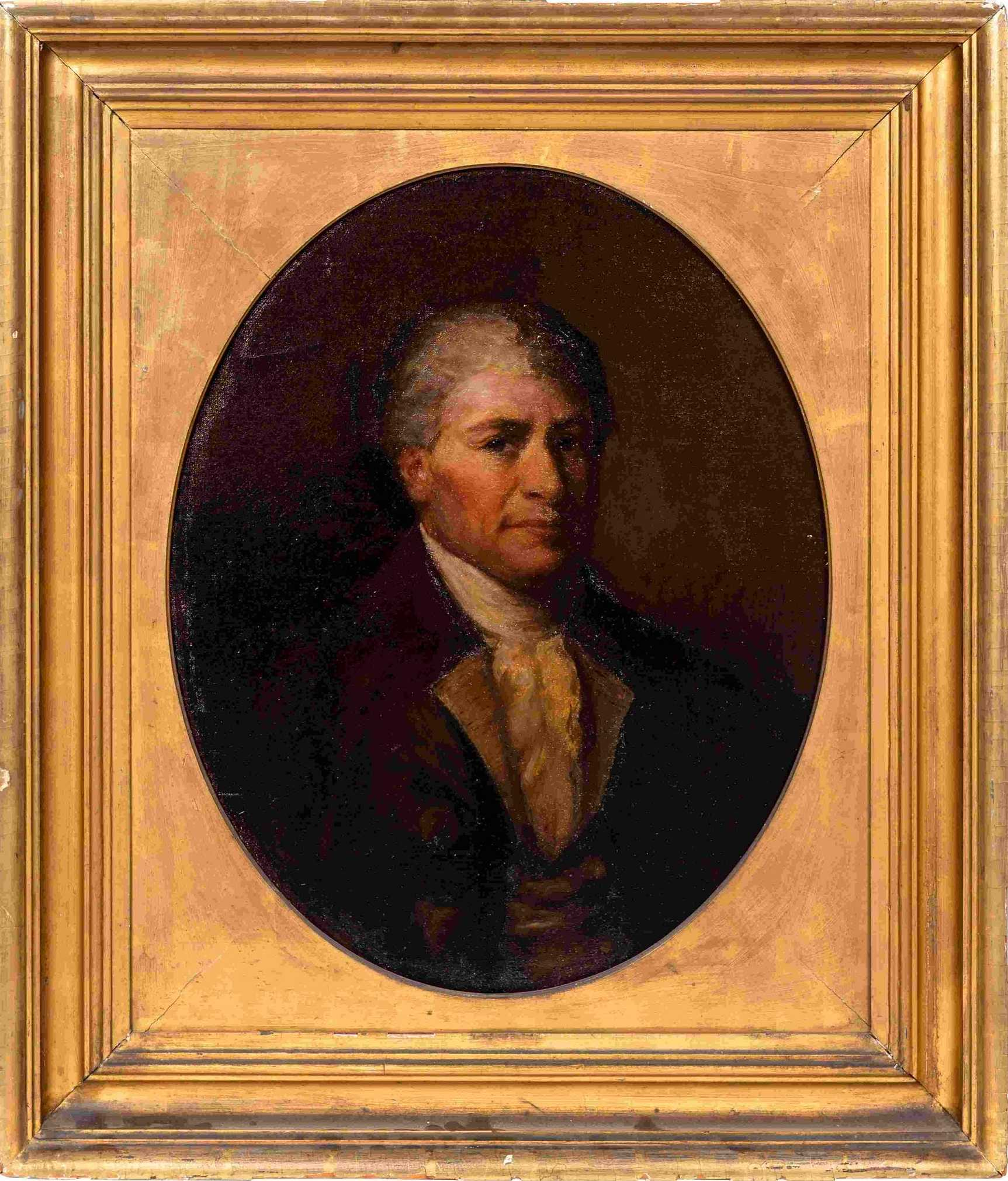
- portrait by Gilbert Stuart
- Born: 9 March 1739
- Died: 9 May 1805 (aged 66)

Moses Michael Hays (March 9, 1739 – May 9, 1805) was an American banker, merchant, and philanthropist. As Boston's most prominent 18th-century Jewish citizen, Moses Michael Hays set a high standard for civic leadership and charity.

He helped establish the New England Masonic movement and was elected Grand Master in 1792 with Paul Revere as his deputy.

== Early life ==
Hays was born in New York City in 1739 to Dutch Jewish immigrants Judah Hays and Rebecca Michaels. They were Sephardic, descended from Jews who had left Spain and Portugal. Judah Hays took his son into his shipping and retail business, and upon his death in 1764, left him the business and largest share of his assets. Moses continued his father's commitment to Congregation Shearith Israel, serving as second parnas (vice-president) in 1766 and parnas in 1767.

In 1766, Hays married Rachel Myers, younger sister of Myer Myers, a famed New York silversmith. The couple moved to Newport, Rhode Island in 1769, where Hays continued his shipping business. Business reverses landed him in debtors' prison but he was set free when he liquidated his assets and repaid his creditors. He immediately reestablished himself in the trans-Atlantic trade.

== Declaration of loyalty ==
In 1775, seventy-six men in Newport were asked to sign a declaration of loyalty to the American colonies that included the phrase "upon the true faith of a Christian." Hays publicly objected to the phrase and refused to sign, standing firm on the philosophy of "all men created equal". Instead he offered a letter affirming his belief that the Revolution was a just cause. Hays signed when the Christian portion of the oath was omitted.

== Move to Boston ==
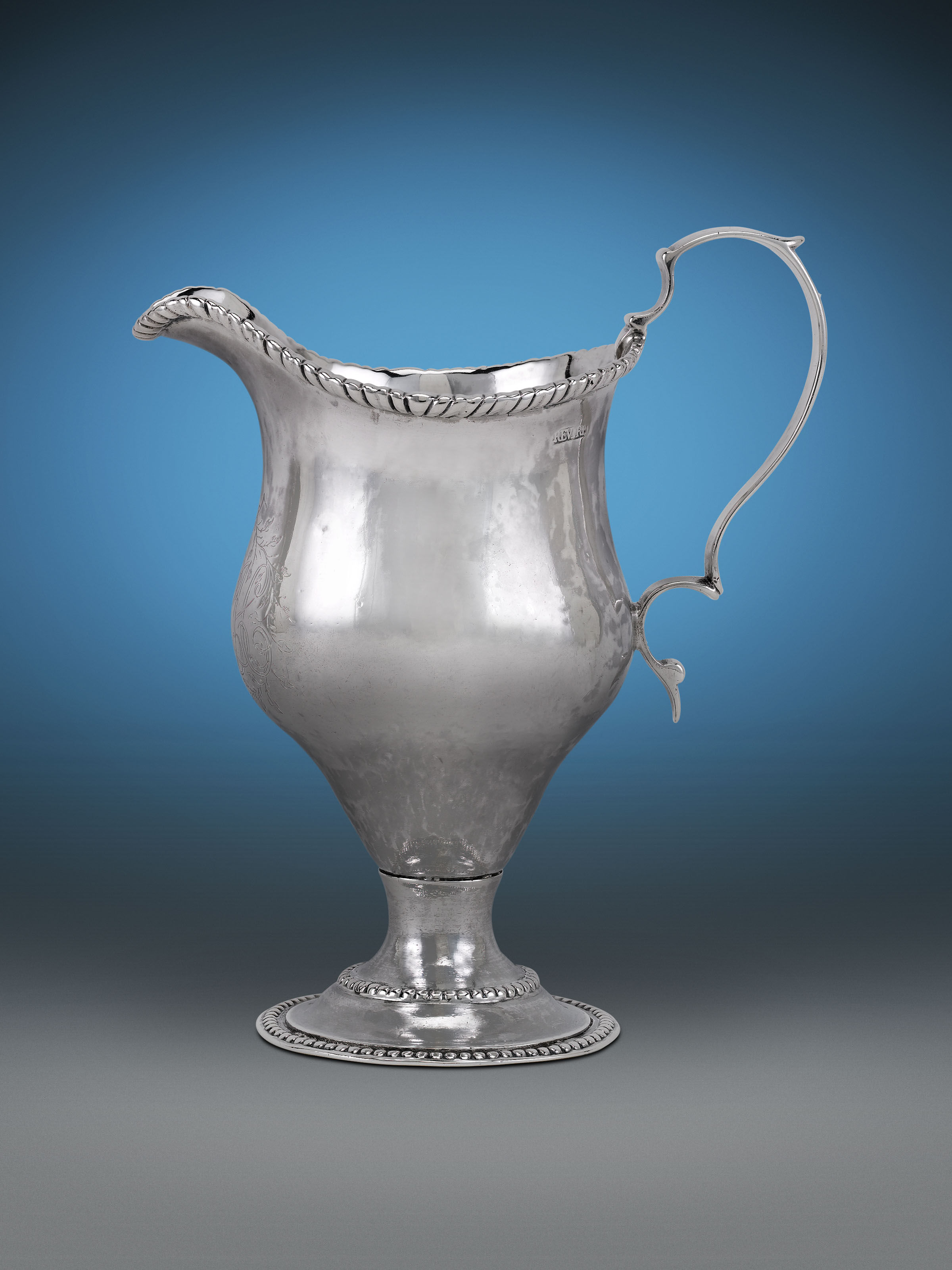
Silver Cream Jug by Paul Revere specially crafted for banker and philanthropist Moses Michael Hays. Stamped "REVERE". Circa 1783

The Hays family left Newport for Boston ahead of the British occupation in 1776. He opened a shipping office in Boston and was among the first merchants there to underwrite shipbuilding, trade and insurance to newly opened Far Eastern markets. In 1784, Hays became a founder and the first depositor of the Massachusetts Bank, still doing business today as part of the Bank of America.

== Legacy ==
In 1783, Rabbi Isaac de Abraham Touro, husband to Hays' sister Reyna, died in Jamaica. Reyna had three children: Abraham, Judah and Rebecca. Moses Hays brought Reyna and her family to Massachusetts and raised her children as his own.

Hays also helped establish the New England Masonic movement. When Hays was accepted into the Massachusetts Lodge in November 1782, he was the only Jew. (There were numerous Jewish men among founders of lodges in Charleston, South Carolina and cities in other Southern states.)

In 1792, the lodge members elected Hays as their Grand Master, with Paul Revere as his Deputy. Hays provided financial support to beautify Boston Common, establish theaters, and endow Harvard College. Hays' descendants helped found the Boston Athenæum and the Massachusetts General Hospital, and remain prominent in Boston public life to this day.

Hays died in 1805 and is buried at The Colonial Jewish Burying Ground in Newport. His story was used for an episode of Liberty's Kids.
