= Hendrick Aupaumut =

Mohican historian and diplomat

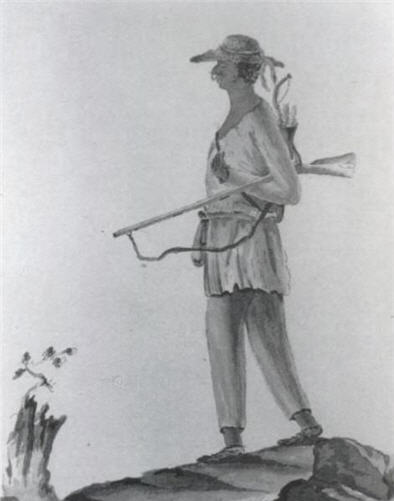
A member of the Stockbridge Militia.

Hendrick Aupaumut (1757–1830) was a Mohican historian and diplomat, born among the Stockbridge Indians in Massachusetts, United States, who were originally from the Hudson River Valley. He was educated by Moravians and converted to Protestantism. Aupaumut was a soldier at the time of the American Revolutionary War, in which he served on the American side as a captain of Mohican warriors.

== Revolutionary War ==
At the outbreak of hostilities, Aupaumut advocated for native tribes to declare for the American side. Traveling through the Ohio Country, he asked Stockbridge, Delaware, and Shawnee peoples to “to rise up against the Red Coats that they may not do as they please with this Big Island … let us humble them." He joined the Stockbridge Militia and served at the Battle of Orsikany and the Saratoga Campaign, rising to the rank of captain.

== Later life ==
According to some sources, Aupaumut also fought against Tecumseh's War during the War of 1812. Concerned about cultural changes and the future of indigenous communities in the new United States, he strove to find common ground and adopt European practices to help his people integrate. He wrote a history of the Mohican people and defended them to President Thomas Jefferson in a letter. He worked with the United States in its exchanges with tribes further west, hoping to negotiate peace, but was, ultimately, unsuccessful, because of powerful settler interests. With the other Stockbridge Indians, he moved westward to avoid increasing settler violence, until they relocated to their present reservation of Stockbridge-Munsee Community in Wisconsin. His notable works include a narrative of his diplomatic attempts in his embassy to the Western Indians.
