= Roger Ninham =

Australian rower

Personal information
- Born: 23 September 1942
- Died: 20 March 1985 (aged 42)
- Height: 6 ft 0 in (183 cm)
- Weight: 168 lb (76 kg)
Medal record
Men's rowing
Representing Australia
Commonwealth Games
Bronze medal – third place	1962 Perth	Men's Coxless Pair

Roger Arthur Ninham (23 September 1942 – 20 March 1985) was an Australian Olympian stillwater rower, a surfboat rower and surfcraft boat builder. As a stillwater rower he was a six-time national champion across both sculling and sweep-oared boats and competed at two Olympic Games.

== Rowing family ==
Ninham's father William Charles Ninham a boat builder, stroked South Australian eights which contested the King's Cup in 1932, 1933 and 1935. As a Perth-based boat building craftsman Bill had a long association with the West Australian Rowing Club and the Fremantle Rowing Club.

Roger's older brother Professor Barry Ninham rowed for the University of Western Australia at the Australian University Championships from 1954 to 1957 and in the 1970s coached crews at the Australian National University during his tenure as a teaching physicist. Their younger brother Darrell coxed West Australian Penrith Cup fours in the 1960s and rowed and coached at the masters level in the early 2000s. Roger's niece (Barry's daughter) Sally Ninham was an Australian national champion lightweight rower who won a silver medal at the 1990 World Rowing Championships.

== Club and state rowing ==
Roger Ninham's senior club rowing was initially from the West Australian Rowing Club and later from the Mosman Rowing Club.

Ninham's first state selection for Western Australia came when he was still aged 17 and selected into the 1960 men's eight which contested and won the King's Cup at the Interstate Regatta within Australian Rowing Championships. In 1961 he was the Western Australian entrant to race the President's Cup – the interstate single sculls championship. He won that 1961 title.

In Ninham relocated to Sydney and joined the Mosman Rowing Club. At the 1962 Australian Rowing Championships he contested and won the national coxless pair title in Mosman colours with Peter Raper and won the coxless four title with Raper, Maurice Grace and Bill Hatfield. In 1964 and 1966 he won the national coxless pair title again – both times paired with Bob Shirlaw. In 1966 he also contested the coxless four title in a composite Haberfield/Mosman crew.

== International representative rowing ==
The entire West Australian champion King's Cup eight of 1960 were selected without alteration as the Australian eight to compete at the 1960 Rome Olympics. The crew was graded as the second of the seven Australian Olympic boats picked for Rome and was therefore fully funded by the Australian Olympic Committee. Ninham rowed in the seven seat of the eight. They were eliminated in the repechage on Lake Albano at the 1960 Olympics.

The Mosman Rowing Club national champion coxless four of 1962 with Ninham at stroke was selected in toto as the coxless four for the 1962 Perth Commonwealth Games. Dissension amongst the members of the four saw Ninham and Hatfield move into the pair and the Victorian emergencies Newcomb and Boykett coming into the four. Ninham and Hatfield won bronze in the pair and the four were the only unplaced Australian boat at the Games.

In 1964 as the Australian champion coxless pair, Ninham and Bob Shirlaw were selected as Australia's coxless pair to compete at the 1964 Tokyo Olympics in the coxless pair. They finished third in the B final for an overall ninth place.

== Surfboats and boat building ==
Ninham had a deep involvement with surfcraft and surfboat rowing. As a young man he had worked for his father in Perth building rowing shells and surfboats and in Perth became involved in rowing surfboats. In the early 1960s he came to Sydney, worked for a local builder for a short period then set up his own boatyard in Manly Vale. In the 1960s he designed a unique timber and fibreglass double surf ski that is registered with the Australian Register of Historic Vessels. In 1971 a surfboat he had built and rowed for his club – Queenscliff SLSC – won the 1971 Australian National Championship in Perth. Other Surf Life Saving Clubs around the country sought orders for the same design and Ninham's boat-building business prospered.

In 1997 he was inducted into the Australian Surf Rowers League's Hall of Fame.

== Personal ==
Ninham's last year were spent in Sydney. He was diagnosed with a brain tumour in 1985 and died that same year. He was survived by his wife Marlene, daughters Tanya and Melissa, granddaughter Mia and grandson Samuel.
