= Mohicans =

Indigenous peoples of the Northeastern Woodlands

Muhhekunneuw Mahiikaniiwak

Total population
- c. 3,000

Regions with significant populations
- United States (formerly Upstate New York; currently Shawano County, Wisconsin)

Languages
- English, formerly Mohican

Religion
- Moravian Church

Related ethnic groups
- Lenape, Munsee, Abenaki

The Mohicans or Mahicans (/moʊˈhiːkənz/ or /məˈhiːkənz/) are an Indigenous people of the Northeastern Woodlands who spoke an Eastern Algonquian language. Historically, they were based in Upstate New York. Today, they are enrolled in the federally recognized Stockbridge Munsee Community in Wisconsin.

The Mohicans lived in the upper tidal Hudson River Valley, including the confluence of the Mohawk River (where present-day Albany, New York, developed) and into western New England centered on the upper Housatonic River watershed. After 1680, due to conflicts with the powerful Mohawk to the west during the Beaver Wars, many were driven southeastward across the present-day Massachusetts western border and the Taconic Mountains to Berkshire County around Stockbridge, Massachusetts.

They combined with Lenape Native Americans (a branch known as the Munsee) in Stockbridge, Massachusetts, and later the people moved west away from pressure of European invasion. They settled in what became Shawano County, Wisconsin. Most Eastern Native American populations were forced to reservation in Indian Territory during the 1830s, and other reservations in the American West later. Decades later the United States government organized the Stockbridge-Munsee Community with enrolled citizens of the Munsee people and a 22,000-acre (89 km^{2}) reservation, which was originally the land of the Menominee people.

Following the disruption of the American Revolutionary War, most of the Mohican descendants first migrated westward to join the Oneida, a Haudenosaunee people, on their reservation in central New York. The Oneida gave them about 22,000 acres for their use. After more than two decades, in the 1820s and 1830s, the Oneida and the Stockbridge moved again, pressured to sell their lands and relocate to northeastern Wisconsin under the federal Indian Removal Act. A group of Mohican also migrated to Ontario, Canada to live with the predominantly Haudenosaunee Six Nations of the Grand River reserve.

== Name ==
The tribe identified by the place where they lived: Muh-he-ka-neew (or "people of the continually flowing waters"). According to Daniel G. Brinton and James Hammond Trumbull, "two well-known authorities on Mohican history", the word Muh-he-kan refers to a body of water that flows in both directions, being tidal to most of its Mohican range, so they named the Hudson River Mahicanuck, or the river with waters that are never still. Therefore, they, along with other tribes living along the Hudson River, such as the Munsee to their west, known by the dialect of Lenape that they spoke, and Wappinger to the south, were called "the River Indians" by the Dutch and English.

The Dutch heard and transliterated the term for the people of the area in their own language, variously as: Mahigan, Mahinganak, Maikan, among other variants, which the English later expressed as Mohican, in a transliteration to their own spelling system. The French, adopting names used by their Indian allies in Canada, knew the Mohican as the Loups (or wolves). They referred to the Haudenosaunee Confederacy as the "Snake People" (as they were called by some competitors, or "Five Nations", representing their original tribes). Like the Munsee and Wappinger peoples, the Mohican were Algonquian-speaking, part of a large language family related also to the Lenape people, who occupied coastal areas from western Long Island to the Delaware River valley to the south.

== History ==
=== Mohican Confederacy ===
The Mohican were a confederacy of five tribes and as many as forty villages.

- Mohican proper, lived in the vicinity of today's Albany (Pempotowwuthut-Muhhcanneuw, "the fireplace of the Mahican Nation") west towards the Mohawk River and to the northwest to Lake Champlain and Lake George
- Mechkentowoon, lived along the west shore of the Hudson River above the Catskill Creek
- Wawyachtonoc (or Wawayachtonoc, "eddy people" or "people of the curving channel"), lived in Dutchess County and Columbia County eastward to the Housatonic River in Litchfield County, Connecticut, main village was Weantinock, additional villages: Shecomeco, Wechquadnach, Pamperaug, Bantam, Weataug, Scaticook
- Westenhuck (from hous atenuc, "on the other side of the mountains"), the name of a village near Great Barrington, Massachusetts. Often called the "Housatonic people", they lived in the Housatonic Valley in Connecticut and Massachusetts and in the vicinity of Great Barrington, which they called Mahaiwe, meaning "the place downstream"
- Wiekagjoc (from wikwajek, "upper reaches of a river"), lived east of the Hudson Rivers near the city of Hudson, Columbia County, New York

=== Conflict with the Mohawk ===
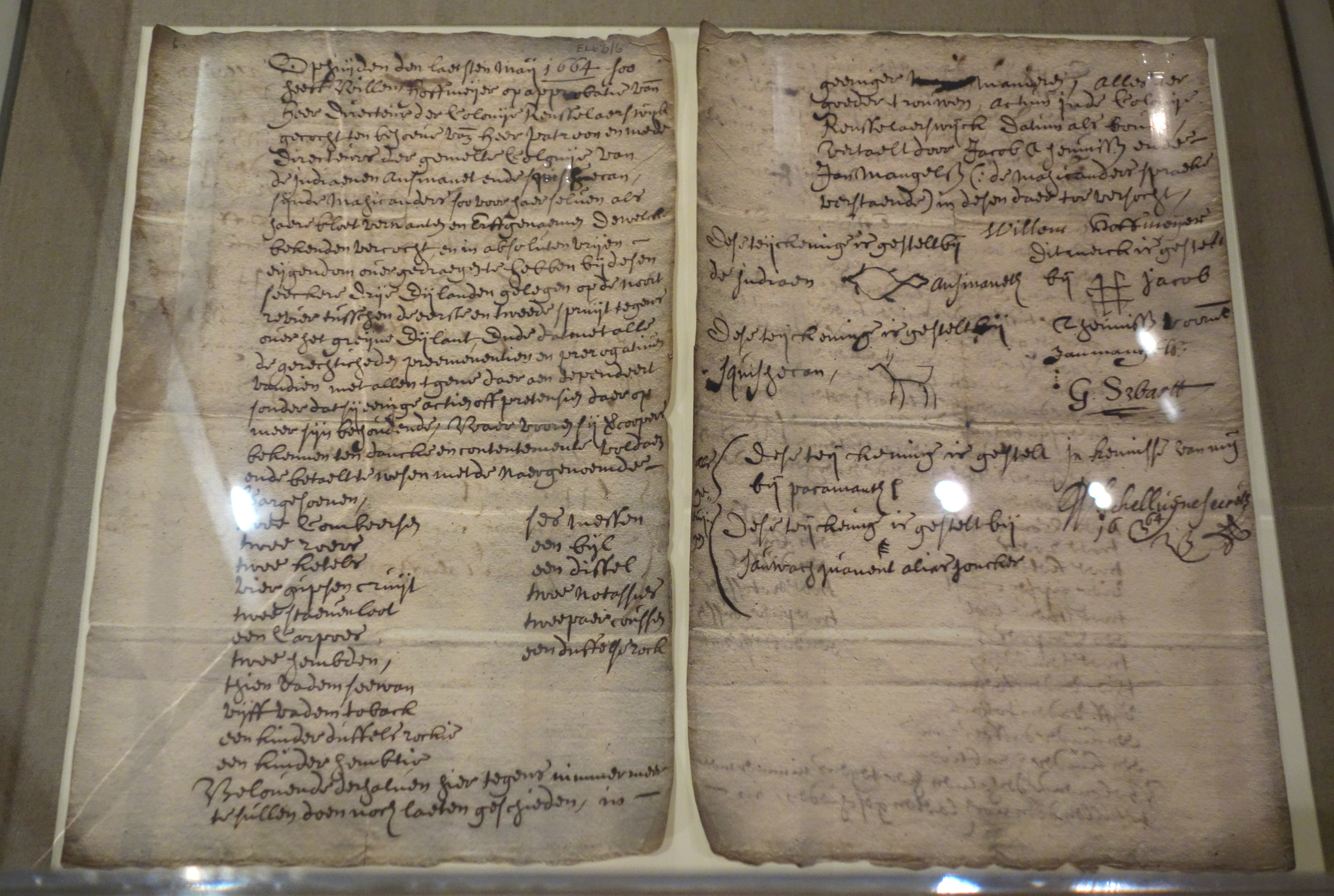
Land deed, 31 May 1664, Willem Hoffmeyer purchase of 3 islands in the Hudson River near Troy from three native Mohicans – Albany Institute of History and Art

The Algonquians, including the Mohican, and Haudenosaunee were traditional competitors and enemies. Haudenosaunee oral tradition, as recorded in the Jesuit Relations, speaks of a war between the Mohawks and an alliance of the Susquehannock and Algonquin sometime between 1580 and 1600. This was perhaps in response to the formation of the League of the Haudenosaunee.

In September 1609 Henry Hudson encountered Mohican villages just below present day Albany, with whom he traded goods for furs. Hudson returned to Holland with a cargo of valuable furs which immediately attracted Dutch merchants to the area. The first Dutch fur traders arrived on the Hudson River the following year to trade with the Mohicans. Besides exposing them to European epidemics, the fur trade destabilized the region.

In 1614, the Dutch decided to establish a permanent trading post on Castle Island, but first they had to arrange a truce to end fighting which had broken out between the Mohicans and Mohawks. Fighting broke out again between the Mohicans and Mohawks in 1617, and with Fort Nassau badly damaged by a freshet, the Dutch abandoned the fort. In 1618, having once again negotiated a truce, the Dutch rebuilt Fort Nassau on higher ground. Late that year, Fort Nassau was destroyed by flooding and abandoned for good. In 1624, Captain Cornelius Jacobsen May sailed the Nieuw Nederlandt upriver and landed eighteen families of Walloons on a plain opposite Castle Island. They commenced to construct Fort Orange.

The Mohicans invited the Algonquin and Innu (Montagnais) to bring their furs to Fort Orange as an alternative to French traders in Quebec. Seeing the Mohicans extend their control over the fur trade, the Mohawk attacked, with initial success. In 1625 or 1626 the Mohicans destroyed the easternmost Haudenosaunee "castle". The Mohawks then re-located south of the Mohawk River, closer to Fort Orange. In July 1626 many of the settlers moved to New Amsterdam because of the conflict. The Mohicans requested help from the Dutch and Commander Daniel Van Krieckebeek set out from the fort with six soldiers. Van Krieckebeek, three soldiers, and twenty-four Mohicans were killed when their party was ambushed by the Mohawk about a mile from the fort. The Mohawks withdrew with some body parts of those slain for later consumption as a demonstration of supremacy.

War continued to rage between the Mohicans and Mohawks throughout the area from Skahnéhtati (Schenectady) to Kinderhoek (Kinderhook). By 1629, the Mohawks had taken over territories on the west bank of the Hudson River that were formerly held by the Mohicans. The conflict caused most of the Mohicans to migrate eastward across the Hudson River into western Massachusetts and Connecticut. The Mohawks gained a near-monopoly in the fur trade with the Dutch by prohibiting the nearby Algonquian-speaking tribes to the north or east from trading.

=== Stockbridge ===
Many Mohicans settled in the town of Stockbridge, Massachusetts, where they gradually became known as the "Stockbridge Indians". Etow Oh Koam, one of their chiefs, accompanied three Mohawk chiefs on a state visit to Queen Anne and her government in England in 1710. They were popularly referred to as the Four Mohawk Kings.

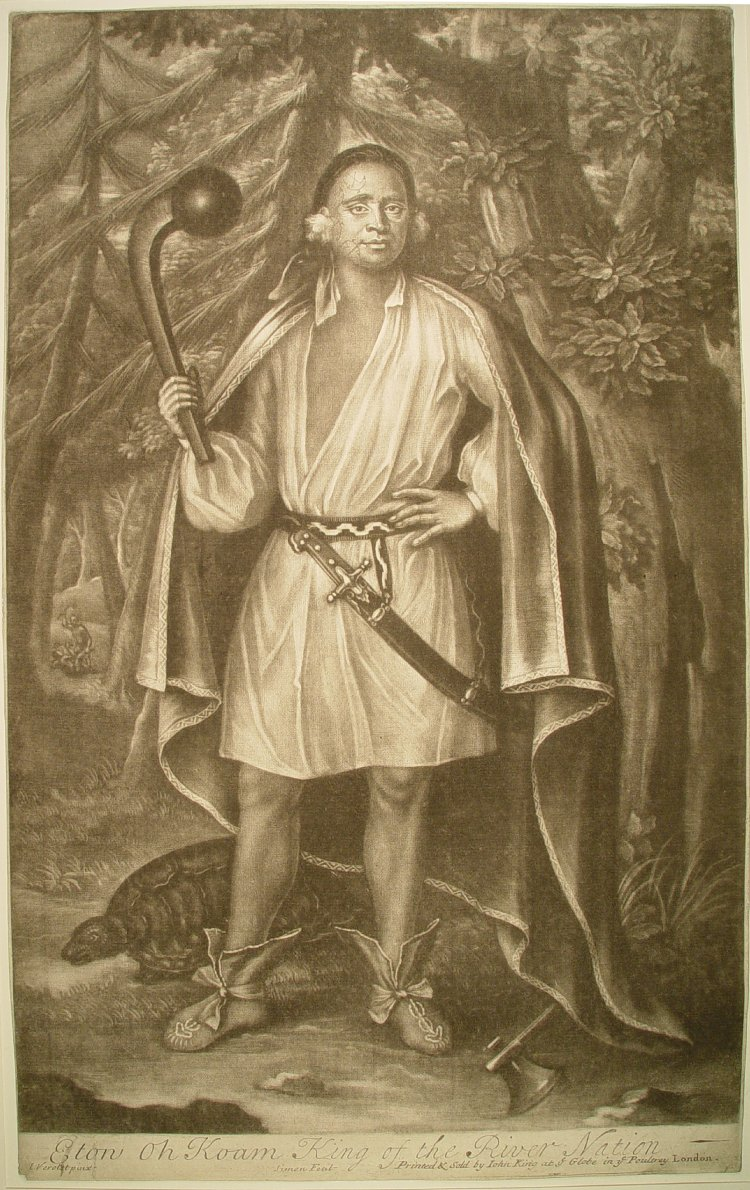
The Mohican chief Etow Oh Koam, referred to as one of the Four Mohawk Kings in a state visit to Queen Anne in 1710. By John Simon, c. 1750.

The Stockbridge Indians allowed Protestant missionaries, including Jonathan Edwards, to live among them. In the 18th century, many converted to Christianity, while keeping certain traditions of their own. They fought on the side of the British colonists in the French and Indian War (also known as the Seven Years' War). During the American Revolution, they sided with the colonists.

In the 18th century, some of the Mohicans developed strong ties with missionaries of the Moravian Church from Bethlehem, Pennsylvania, who founded a mission at their village of Shekomeko in Dutchess County, New York. Henry Rauch reached out to two Mohican leaders, Maumauntissekun, also known as Shabash; and Wassamapah, who took him back to Shekomeko. They named him the new religious teacher. Over time, Rauch won listeners, as the Mohicans had suffered much from disease and warfare, which had disrupted their society. Early in 1742, Shabash and two other Mohicans accompanied Rauch to Bethlehem, where he was to be ordained as a deacon. The three Mohicans were baptized on 11 February 1742 in John de Turk's barn nearby at Oley, Pennsylvania. Shabash was the first Mohican of Shekomeko to adopt the Christian religion. The Moravians built a chapel for the Mohican people in 1743. They defended the Mohican against European colonists' exploitation, trying to protect them against land encroachment and abuses of liquor.

On a 1738 visit to New York, the Mohicans spoke to Governor Lewis Morris concerning the sale of their land near Shekomeko. The Governor promised they would be paid as soon as the lands were surveyed. He suggested that for their own security, they should mark off their square mile of land they wished to keep, which the Mohicans never did. In September 1743, still under the Acting-Governor George Clarke the land was finally surveyed by New York Assembly agents and divided into lots, a row of which ran through the Indians' reserved land. With some help from the missionaries, on 17 October 1743 and already under the new Royal Governor George Clinton, Shabash put together a petition of names of people who could attest that the land in which one of the lots was running through was theirs. Despite Shabash's appeals, his persistence, and the missionaries' help, the Mohicans lost the case. The lots were eventually bought up by European-American colonists and the Mohicans were forced out of Shekomeko. Some who opposed the missionaries' work accused them of being secret Catholic Jesuits (who had been outlawed from the colony in 1700) and of working with the Mohicans on the side of the French. The missionaries were summoned more than once before colonial government, but also had supporters. In the late 1740s the colonial government at Poughkeepsie expelled the missionaries from New York, in part because of their advocacy of Mohican rights. European colonists soon took over the Mohican land.

==== Revolutionary War ====
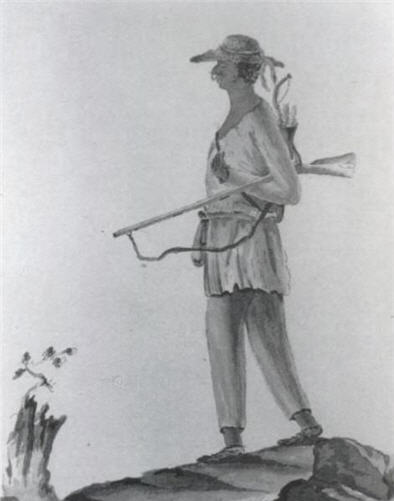
Von Ewald sketch of a Stockbridge Militia warrior who fought on the Patriot side in the Continental Army during the American Revolutionary War

In August 1775, the Six Nations staged a council fire near Albany, after news of Bunker Hill had made war seem imminent. After much debate, they decided that such a war was a private affair between the British and the colonists (known as Rebels, Revolutionaries, Congress-Men, American Whigs, or Patriots), and that they should stay out of it. Mohawk Chief Joseph Brant feared that the Indians would lose their lands if the Colonists achieved independence. Sir William Johnson, his son John Johnson and son-in-law Guy Johnson and Brant used all their influence to engage the Haudenosaunee to fight for the British cause. The Mohawk, Onondaga, Cayuga, and Seneca ultimately became allies and provided warriors for the battles in the New York area. The Oneida and Tuscarora sided with the Colonists. The Mohicans, who as Algonquians were not part of the Haudenosaunee Confederacy, sided with the Patriots, serving at the Siege of Boston, and the battles of Saratoga and Monmouth.

In 1778 they lost forty warriors of their Stockbridge Militia, around half "Stockbridge Indians" who were remnants of both Mohican and Wappinger tribes, in a British attack on the land of the van Cortlandt family. (In 1888, the property became Van Cortlandt Park in the Bronx, New York.) The Battle of Kingsbridge decimated the troop's ranks. It received a commendation from George Washington, was paid $1,000 and dismissed.

=== Move to Oneida, New York ===
After the Revolution the citizens of the new United States forced many Native Americans off their land and westward. In the 1780s, groups of Stockbridge Indians, today regarded as Stockbridge Munsee, moved from Massachusetts to a new location among the Oneida people in central New York, who had been granted a 300,000-acre (120,000 ha) reservation for their service to the Patriots, out of their former territory of 6,000,000 acres (2,400,000 ha). They called their settlement New Stockbridge. Some individuals and families, mostly people who were old or those with special ties to the area, remained behind at Stockbridge.

The central figures of Mohican society, including the chief sachem, Joseph Quanaukaunt, and his counselors and relatives, were part of the move to New Stockbridge. At the new town, the Stockbridge emigrants controlled their own affairs and combined traditional ways with the new as they chose. After learning from the Christian missionaries, the Stockbridge Indians were experienced in English ways. At New Stockbridge they replicated their former town. While continuing as Christians, they retained their language and Mohican cultural traditions. In general, their evolving Mohican identity was still rooted in traditions of the past.

=== Removal to Wisconsin ===
In the 1820s and 1830s, most of the Stockbridge Indians moved to Shawano County, Wisconsin, where they were promised land by the US government under the policy of Indian removal. In Wisconsin, they settled on reservations with the Lenape (called Munsee after one of their major dialects), who were also speakers of one of the Algonquian languages. Together, the two formed a band and are federally recognized as the Stockbridge-Munsee Community.

Their 22,000-acre reservation is known as that of the Stockbridge-Munsee Band of Mohican Indians and is located near the town of Bowler. Since the late twentieth century, they have developed the North Star Mohican Resort and Casino on their reservation, which has successfully generated funds for tribal welfare and economic development.

== Territory ==
In their own language, the Mohican identified collectively as the Muhhekunneuw, "people of the waters that are never still".

At the time of their first contact with Europeans traders along the river in the 1590s, the Mohican were living in and around the Hudson River (or Mahicannituck). After 1609, at the time of the Dutch settlement of New Netherland, they also ranged along the eastern Mohawk River and the Hoosic River, and south along the Hudson to the Roeliff Jansen Kill, where they bordered on the Wappinger people. This nation inhabited the river area and its interior southward to today's New York City.

Most of the Mohican communities lay along the upper tidal reaches of the Hudson River and along the watersheds of Kinderhook-Claverack-Taghkanic Creek, the Roeliff Jansen Kill, Catskil Creek, and adjacent areas of the Housatonic watershed. Mohican territory reached along Hudson River watersheds northeastward to Wood Creek just south of Lake Champlain.

=== Land claims ===
In the late 20th century, the Stockbridge-Munsee were among tribes filing land claims against New York, which had been ruled to have unconstitutionally acquired land from Indians without Senate ratification. The Stockbridge-Munsee filed a land claim against New York state for 23,000 acres (9,300 ha) in Madison County, the location of its former property. In 2011, outgoing governor David Paterson announced having reached a deal with the tribe. They would be given nearly 2 acres (0.81 ha) in Madison County and give up their larger claim in exchange for the state's giving them 330 acres of land in Sullivan County in the Catskill Mountains, where the government was trying to encourage economic development. The federal government had agreed to take the land in trust, making it eligible for development as a gaming casino, and the state would allow gaming, an increasingly important source of revenue for American Indians. Race track and casinos, private interests and other tribes opposed the deal.

In 2011, the Stockbridge-Munsee Community Band of the Mohican Indians regained ownership 156 acres along the Hudson River, a tract known as Papscanee Island Nature Preserve near East Greenbush and Schodack. The land was donated to descendants of its Indigenous inhabitants by the Open Space Initiative. Prior to colonization, the island was used for ceremonies by the Mohicans before it was acquired by Dutch merchant Kiliaen Van Rensselaer in 1637. The property is managed by Rensselaer County and the Rensselaer Land Trust for public access and protection, while owned by the Mohicans.

== Language ==
The formally extinct Mohican language belonged to the Eastern Algonquian branch of the Algonquian language family.

== Culture ==
The Mohican villages were governed by hereditary sachems advised by a council of clan elders. They had a matrilineal kinship system, with property and inheritance (including such hereditary offices) passed through the maternal line. Moravian missionary John Heckewelder and early anthropologist Lewis H. Morgan both learned from Mohican informants that their matrilineal society was divided into three phratries (Turkey, Turtle, and Wolf). These were divided into clans or subclans, including a potentially prominent Bear Clan. This finding is supported by the evidence of Mohican signatures on treaties and land deeds (see the works of Shirley Dunn).

A general council of sachems met regularly at Scodac (east of present-day Albany) to decide important matters affecting the entire confederacy. In his history of the Indians of the Hudson River, Edward Manning Ruttenber described the clans of the Mohican as the Bear, the Turkey, the Turtle, and the Wolf. Each had a role in the lives of the people, and the Wolf served as warriors in the north to defend against the Mohawk, the easternmost of the Five Nations of the Haudenosaunee.

Like the Munsee-speaking communities to their south, Mohican villages followed a dispersed settlement pattern, with each community likely dominated by a single lineage or clan. The villages usually consisted of a small cluster of small and mid-sized longhouses, and were located along floodplains. During times of war, they built fortifications in defensive locations (such as along ridges) as places of retreat. Their cornfields were located near their communities; the women also cultivated varieties of squash, beans, sunflowers, and other crops from the Eastern Agricultural Complex. Horticulture and the gathering and processing of nuts (hickory, butternuts, black walnuts and acorns), fruits (blueberries, raspberries, juneberries among many others), and roots (groundnuts, wood lilies, arrowroot among others) provided much of their diet. This was supplemented by the men hunting game (turkeys, deer, elk, bears, and moose in the Taconics) and fishing (sturgeon, alewives, shad, eels, lamprey and striped bass).

== Representation in media ==
James Fenimore Cooper based his novel, The Last of the Mohicans, on the Mohican tribe. His description includes some cultural aspects of the Mohegan, a different Algonquian tribe that lived in eastern Connecticut. Cooper set his novel in the Hudson Valley, Mohican land, but used some Mohegan names for his characters, such as Uncas.

The novel has been adapted for the cinema more than a dozen times, the first time in 1920. Michael Mann directed a 1992 adaptation, which starred Daniel Day-Lewis as a White man adopted and raised by the Mohican.

== Notable historical Mohicans ==
Contemporary people should be listed under the tribe in which they are enrolled.

- Etow Oh Koam, Mohican sachem and one of the Four Indian Kings, who, with three Mohawk leaders, made a state visit to Queen Anne and her government in England in 1710.
- Hendrick Aupaumut (1757–1830), sachem, historian, and American Revolutionary War captain
- Electa Quinney (1798–1885), first public teacher and school mistress in Wisconsin
- John Wannuaucon Quinney (1797–1855), diplomat

== See also ==
- Native American tribes in Massachusetts

== Bibliography ==
- Aupaumut, Hendrick. (1790). "History of the Muh-he-con-nuk Indians", in American Indian Nonfiction, An Anthology of Writings, 1760s–1930s (pp. 63–71). Norman: University of Oklahoma Press.
- Nekatcit. The Celestial Bear Comes Down to Earth: The Bear Sacrifice Ceremony of the Munsee-Mahican in Canada as Related by Nekatcit Edited by Frank G. Speck in collaboration with Jesse Moses, Delaware Nation. Pub. 1945, Reading Public Museum.
- Jones, Electa. (1854). "Stockbridge Past and Present".
- Ruttenber, E. M. (1872). "History of the Indian Tribes of Hudson's River; Their Origin, Manners and Customs; Tribal and Sub-Tribal Organizations; Wars, Treaties, Etc., Etc." Albany: J. Munsell History Series.
- Starna, William A.: From Homeland to New Land: A History of the Mahican Indians, 1600–1830. University of Nebraska Press, 2013. ISBN 978-0803244955
- Brasser, T. J. (1978). "Mahican", in B. G. Trigger (Ed.), Northeast (pp. 198–212). Handbook of North American Indian languages (Vol. 15). Washington, D.C.: Smithsonian Institution.
- Cappel, Constance, "The Smallpox Genocide of the Odawa Tribe at L'Arbre Croche, 1763", The History of a Native American People, Lewiston, New York: Edwin Mellen Press, 2007.
- Conkey, Laura E.; Bolissevain, Ethel; & Goddard, Ives. (1978). "Indians of southern New England and Long Island: Late period", in B. G. Trigger (Ed.), Northeast (pp. 177–189). Handbook of North American Indian languages (Vol. 15). Washington, D.C.: Smithsonian Institution.
- Salwen, Bert. (1978). "Indians of southern New England and Long Island: Early period", in B. G. Trigger (Ed.), Northeast (pp. 160–176). Handbook of North American Indian languages (Vol. 15). Washington, D.C.: Smithsonian Institution.
- Simpson, J. A.; & Weiner, E. S. C. (1989). "Mohican", Oxford English Dictionary. Oxford: Clarendon Press. (Online version).
- Sturtevant, William C. (Ed.). (1978–present). Handbook of North American Indians (Vol. 1–20). Washington, D. C.: Smithsonian Institution.
- Trigger, Bruce G. (Ed.). (1978). Northeast, Handbook of North American Indians (Vol. 15). Washington, D. C.: Smithsonian Institution.
