= Wappinger =

Native American tribe

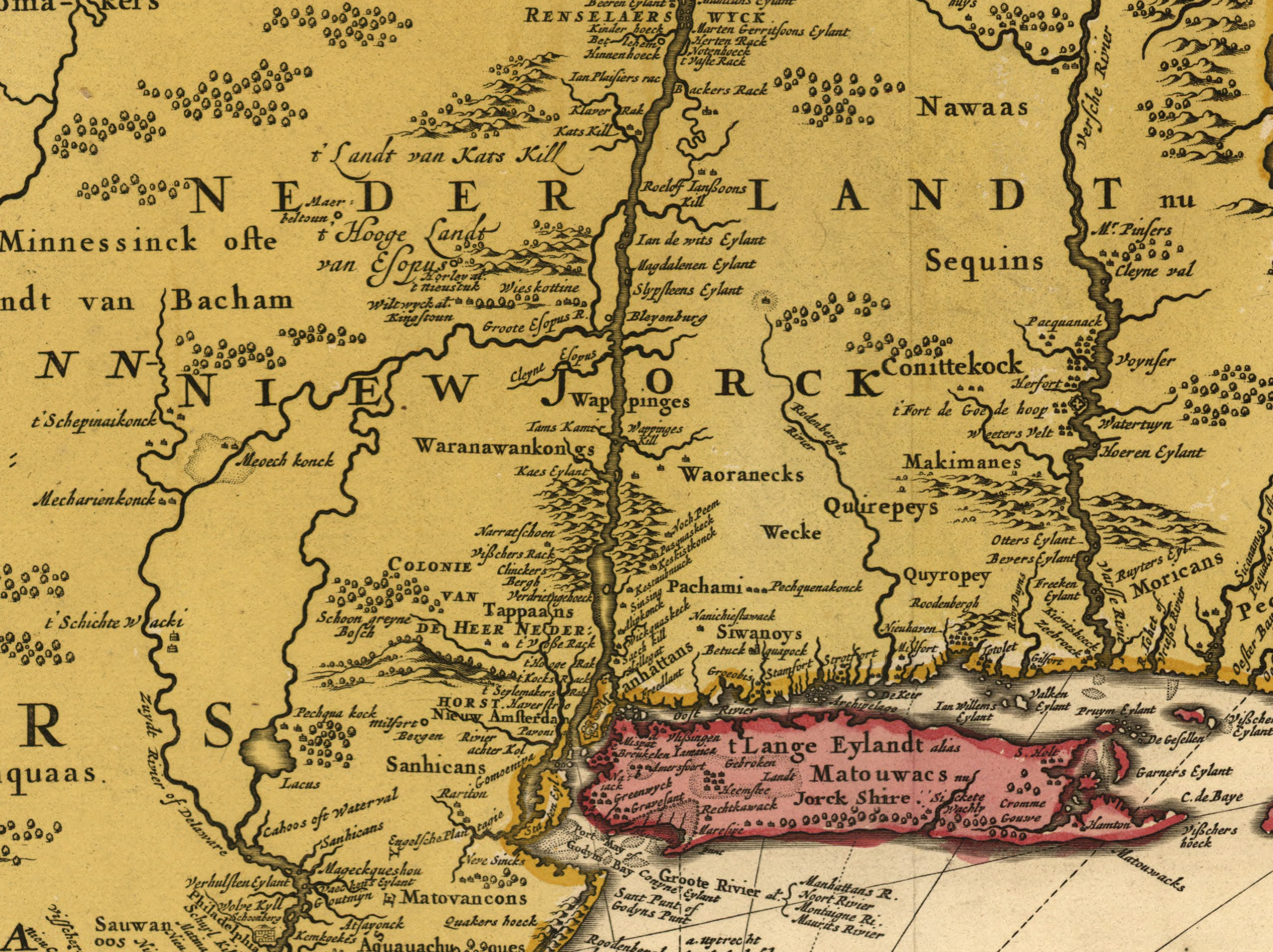
- Wappinger territory (in center, "Wappinges"), from a copy of a 1685 reinterpretation of a 1656 map

Total population
- Extinct as a tribe, descendants joined the Stockbridge-Munsee

Regions with significant populations
- United States (New York)

Languages
- Eastern Algonquian languages, probably Munsee

Religion
- traditional tribal religion

Related ethnic groups
- Other Algonquian peoples

The Wappinger (/ˈwɒpɪndʒər/ WOP-in-jər) were an Eastern Algonquian Munsee-speaking Native American people from what is now southern New York and western Connecticut.

At the time of first contact in the 17th century they were primarily based in what is now Dutchess County, New York, but their territory included the east bank of the Hudson in what became both Putnam and Westchester counties south to the western Bronx and northern Manhattan Island. To the east they reached to the Connecticut River Valley, and to the north the Roeliff Jansen Kill in southernmost Columbia County, New York, marked the end of their territory.

Their nearest allies were the Mohican to the north, the Montaukett to the southeast on Long Island, and the other Algonquin tribes to the east. Like the Lenape, the Wappinger were highly decentralized as a people. They formed numerous loosely associated bands that had established geographic territories.

The Wequaesgeek, a Wappinger people living along the lower Hudson River near today's New York City, were among the first to be recorded encountering European adventurers and traders when Henry Hudson's Half Moon appeared in 1609.

Long after their original settlements had been decimated by wars with the colonists, wars with other Indian tribes, questionable land sales, waves of diseases brought by the Europeans, and absorption into other tribes, their last sachem and a group of their heavily dwindled people were residing at the "prayer town" sanctuary of Stockbridge, Massachusetts. A stalwart spokesman for Native American concerns and valiant soldier, Daniel Nimham had traveled to Great Britain in the 1760s to argue for a return of tribal lands, and served in both the French and Indian Wars (on behalf of the English) and American Revolution (in support of the Colonists). He died with his son Abraham in a slaughter of the Stockbridge Militia at the Battle of Kingsbridge in 1778.

Following the war, what was left of a combined Mohican and Wappinger community in Stockbridge, Massachusetts, left to join the Oneida people in Oneida County in western New York. There they were joined by the remnants of the Munsee, forming the Stockbridge-Munsee tribe.

From that time, the Wappinger ceased to have an independent name in history, and their people intermarried with others. Their descendants were subsequently relocated to a Stockbridge-Munsee reservation in Shawano County, Wisconsin. The tribe operates a casino there, and in 2010 was awarded two small parcels suitable for casinos in New York State in return for dropping larger land claims there.

The totem (or emblem) of the Wappinger was the "enchanted wolf", with the right paw raised defiantly. By one account, they shared this totem with the Mohicans.

== Name ==
The origin of the name Wappinger is unknown. While the present-day spelling was used as early as 1643, numerous alternate phonetic spellings were also used by early European settlers well into the late 19th century. Each linguistic group tended to transliterate Native American names according to their own languages. Among these spellings and terms are:

Wappink, Wappings, Wappingers, Wappingoes, Wawpings, Pomptons, Wapings, Opings, Opines, Massaco, Menunkatuck, Naugatuck, Nochpeem, Wangunk Wappans, Wappings, Wappinghs, Wapanoos, Wappanoos, Wappinoo, Wappenos, Wappinoes, Wappinex, Wappinx, Wapingeis, Wabinga, Wabingies, Wapingoes, Wapings, Wappinges, Wapinger and Wappenger.

Anthropologist Ives Goddard suggests the Munsee language-word wápinkw, used by the Lenape and meaning "opossum", might be related to the name Wappinger. No evidence supports the folk etymology of the name coming from a word meaning "easterner", as suggested by Edward Manning Ruttenber in 1906 and John Reed Swanton in 1952.

Others suggest that Wappinger is anglicized from the Dutch word wapendragers, meaning "weapon-bearers", alluding to the warring relationship between the Dutch and the Wappinger. Such reference would correspond to the first appearance of the spelling in 1643. This was thirty-four years after the Dutch aboard Hudson's Half Moon would have enquired what the people called themselves. The 1643 date reflects a period of great conflict with the Native people, including the preemptive Pavonia massacre by the Dutch, which precipitated Kieft's War.

== Language ==
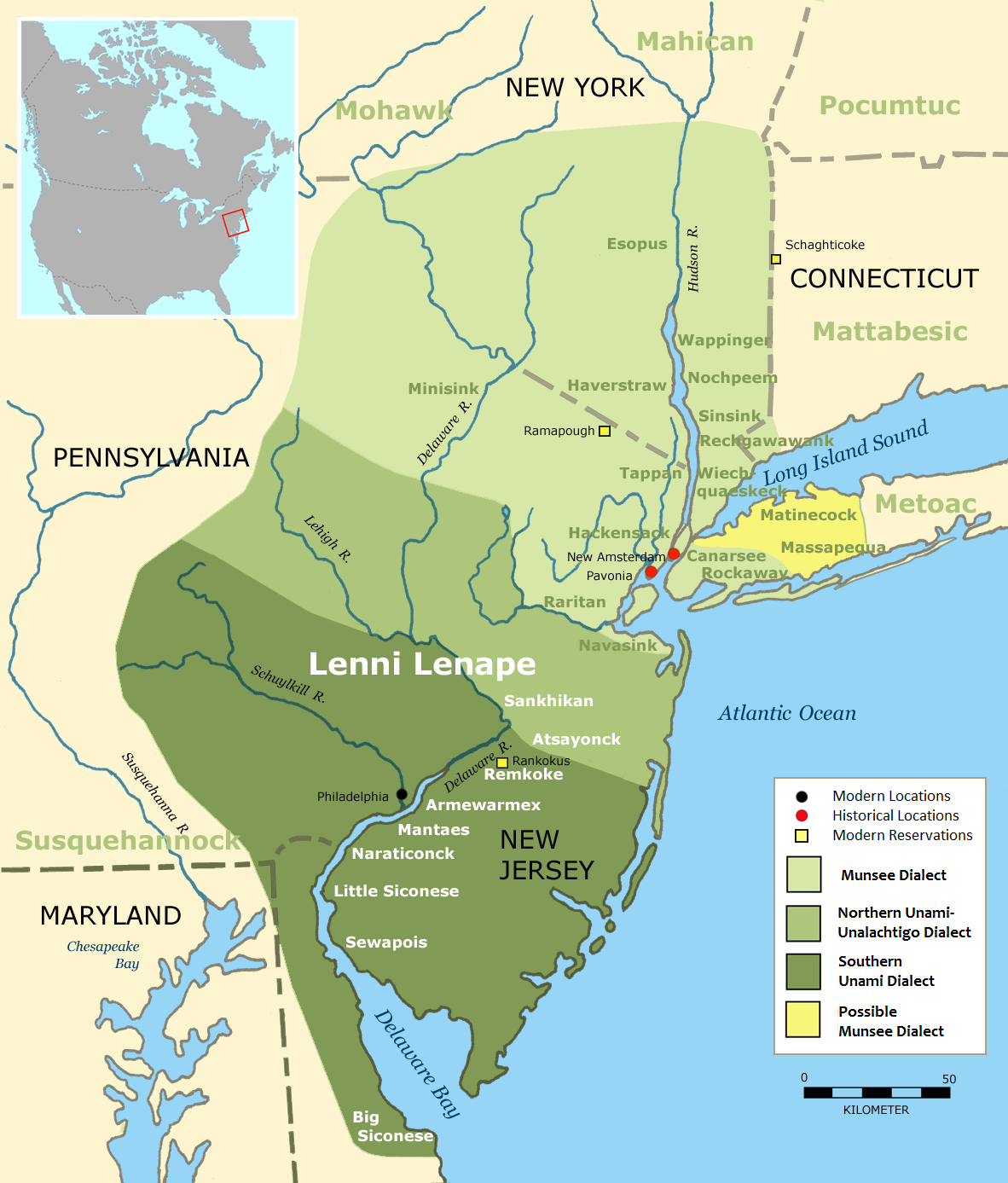
The Wappinger spoke a dialect of the Munsee language, a Lenape tongue

The Wappinger were most closely related to the Munsee, a large subgroup of the Lenape people. All three were among the Eastern Algonquian-speaking subgroup of the Algonquian peoples. They spoke using very similar Lenape languages, with the Wappinger dialect most closely related to the Munsee language.

Their nearest allies were the Mohican to the north, the Montaukett to the southeast on Long Island, and other Algonquin tribes to the east. Like the Lenape, the Wappinger were highly decentralized as a people. They formed approximately 18 loosely associated bands that had established geographic territories.

== History ==
The Wappinger had summer and winter camps. They cultivated maize, beans, and various species of squash. They also hunted game, fished, collected shellfish, and gathered fruits, flowers, seeds, roots, and nuts. By 1609, the Wappingers' earliest recorded European contact, their settlements included camps along the major rivers between the Hudson and Housatonic, with larger villages located at the river mouths. Settlements near fresh water and arable land could remain in one location for about 20 years, until the people moved to another place some miles away. Despite many references to their villages and other site types by early European explorers and settlers, few contact-period sites have been identified in southeastern New York.

=== 17th century ===
The Wappinger first came into contact with Europeans in 1609, when Henry Hudson's expedition reached this territory on the Half Moon. The total population of the Wappinger people at that time has been estimated at between 3,000 and 13,200 individuals.

Robert Juet, an officer on the Half Moon, provides an account in his journal of some of the lower Hudson Valley Native Americans. In his entries for September 4 and 5, 1609, he says:

"This day the people of the country came aboord of us, seeming very glad of our comming, and brought greene tabacco, and gave us of it for knives and beads. They goe in deere skins loose, well dressed. They have yellow copper. They desire cloathes, and are very civill ... They have great store of maize or Indian wheate whereof they make good bread. The country is full of great and tall oakes. This day [September 5, 1609] many of the people came aboord, some in mantles of feathers, and some in skinnes of divers sorts of good furres. Some women also came to us with hempe. They had red copper tabacco pipes and other things of copper they did wear about their neckes. At night they went on land againe, so wee rode very quite, but durst not trust them" (Juet 1959:28).

Dutch navigator and colonist David Pieterz De Vries recorded another description of the Wappinger who resided around Fort Amsterdam:

"The Indians about here are tolerably stout, have black hair with a long, lock which they let hang on one side of the head. Their hair is shorn on the top of the head like a cock's comb. Their clothing is a coat of beaver skins over the body, with the fur inside in winter and outside in summer; they have, also, sometimes a bear's hide, or a coat of the skins of wild cats, or hefspanen [probably raccoon], which is an animal most as hairy as a wild cat, and is also very good to eat. They also wear coats of turkey feathers, which they know how to put together. Their pride is to paint their faces strangely with red or black lead, so that they look like fiends. Some of the women are very well featured, having long countenances. Their hair hangs loose from their head; they are very foul and dirty; they sometimes paint their faces, and draw a black ring around their eyes."

As the Dutch began to settle in the area, they pressured the Connecticut Wappinger to sell their lands and seek refuge with other Algonquian-speaking tribes. The western bands, however, stood their ground amid rising tensions.

Following the Pavonia massacre by colonists, during Kieft's War in 1643, the remaining Wappinger bands united against the Dutch, attacking settlements throughout New Netherland. The Dutch responded with the March 1644 slaughter of between 500 and 700 members of Wappinger bands in the Pound Ridge Massacre, most burned alive in a surprise attack upon their sacred wintering ground. It was a severe blow to the tribe.

The Dutch and the Mohawk, their trading partner and powerful member of the Iroquois Nation in central and western New York, defeated the Wappinger by 1645. Together, the allies killed more than 1500 Wappinger during the two years of the war, a devastating toll for the Wappinger.

The Wappinger faced the Dutch again in the 1655 Peach War, a three-day engagement that left an estimated 100 settlers and 60 Wappinger dead, and strained relations further between the two groups. After the war, the confederation broke apart, and many of the surviving Wappinger left their native lands for the protection of neighboring tribes, settling in particular in the "prayer town" Stockbridge, Massachusetts in the western part of the colony, where Natives had settled who had converted to Christianity.

=== 18th century ===
In 1765, the remaining Wappinger in Dutchess County sued the Philipse family for control of the Philipse Patent land (Note: Then part of Dutchess County, but subsequently all of Putnam County, New York) but lost. In the aftermath the Philipses raised rents on the European-American tenant farmers, sparking colonist riots across the region.

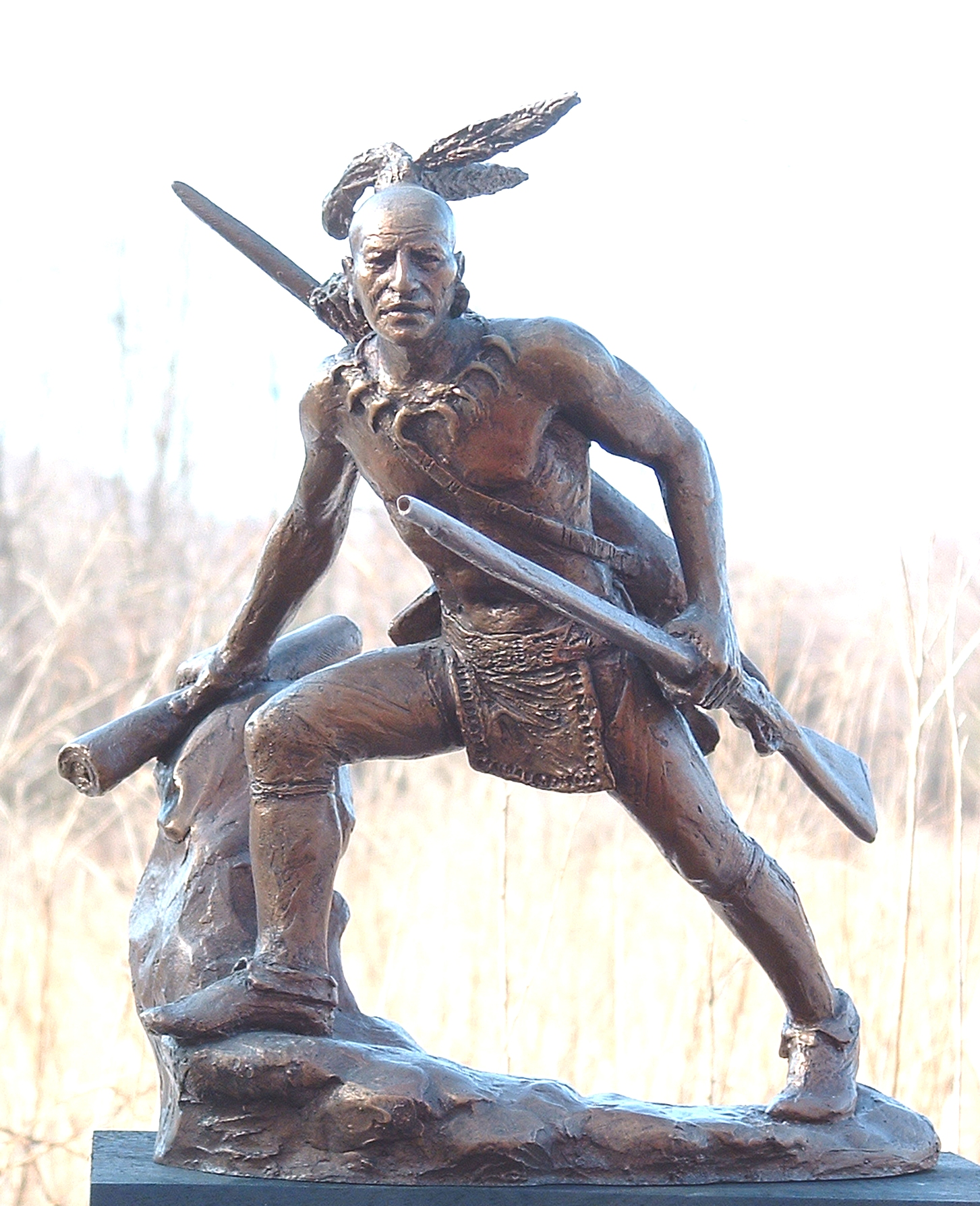
Daniel Nimham, last sachem of the Wappinger

In 1766 Daniel Nimham, last sachem of the Wappinger, was part of a delegation that traveled to London to petition the British Crown for a restoration of land rights and better treatment by the American colonists. Britain had controlled former "Dutch" lands in New York since 1664. Nimham was then living in Stockbridge, but he was originally from the Wappinger settlement of Wiccopee, New York, in today's East Fishkill near the Hudson. He argued before the royal Lords of Trade, who were generally sympathetic to his claims, but did not arrange for the Wappinger to regain any land after he returned to North America.

The Lords of Trade reported that there was sufficient cause to investigate

"frauds and abuses of Indian lands...complained of in the American colonies, and in this colony in particular." And that, "the conduct of the lieutenant-governor and the council...does carry with it the colour of great prejudice and partiality, and of an intention to intimidate these Indians from prosecuting their claims."

Upon a second hearing before New York Provincial Governor Sir Henry Moore and the council, John Morin Scott argued that legal title to the land was only a secondary concern. He said that returning the land to the Indians would set an adverse precedent regarding other similar disputes. Nimham did not give up the cause. When the opportunity to serve with the Continental Army in the American Revolution arose, he chose it over the British in the hopes of receiving fairer treatment by the American government in its aftermath. It was not to be.

Many Wappinger served in the Stockbridge Militia during the American Revolution. Nimham, his son and heir Abraham, and some forty warriors were killed or mortally wounded in the Battle of Kingsbridge in the Bronx on August 30, 1778. It proved an irrevocable blow to the tribe, which had also been decimated by European diseases.

=== 19th century ===
Following the American Revolutionary War, what was left of a combined Mohican and Wappinger community in Stockbridge, Massachusetts, left to join the Oneida people in Oneida County in western New York. There they were joined by the remnants of the Munsee, forming the Stockbridge-Munsee tribe.

From that time the Wappinger ceased to have an independent name in history, and their people intermarried with others. A few scattered remnants still remained in their original territory. As late as 1811, a small band was recorded as having a settlement on a low tract of land by the side of a brook, under a high hill in the northern part of the Town of Kent in Putnam County. (Note: This may well be the same place described as the settlement where David Nimham stayed during his annual pilgrimage up Mount Nimham to survey all he claimed to still be Wappinger territory; it is described as "an area west of today's Boyd's Dam, at the southwest base of the mountain".)

Later in the early 19th century, the Stockbridge-Munsee in New York were forced to remove to Wisconsin. Today, members of the federally recognized Stockbridge-Munsee Nation reside mostly there on a reservation, where they operate a casino. In 2010 the tribe was awarded two tiny parcels suitable for casinos in New York State in return for dropping larger land claims there.

== Bands ==
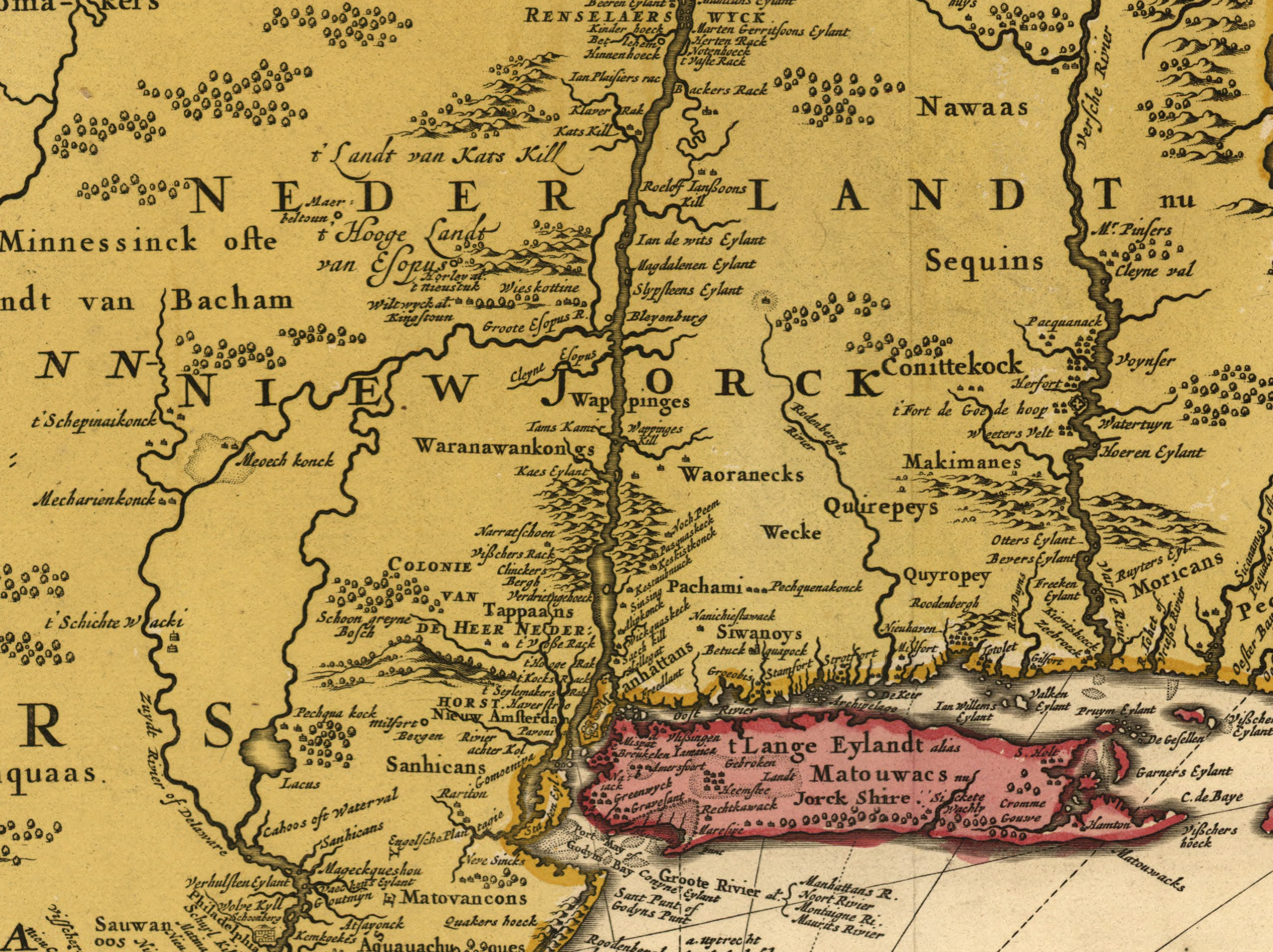
Wappinger bands appear east of the Hudson on this excerpt of Novi Belgii Novæque Angliæ (Amsterdam, 1685) ("New Netherland and New England", and also parts of Virginia, a copy of a 1685 interpretation by Petrus Schenk Junior of a 1656 map by Nicolaes Visscher I)

The suggested bands of the Wappinger, headed by sachems, have been described as including:

- Wappinger (proper), lived on the east side of the Hudson River in present-day Dutchess County, New York
- Hammonasset, an eastern group at the mouth of the Connecticut River, in present-day Middlesex County, Connecticut
- Kitchawank, lived in northern Westchester County, New York in the area of Croton-on-Hudson, New York, site of the oldest oyster-shell middens found on the North Atlantic Coast. There they built a large, fortified village, called Navish, at the neck of Croton Point.
- Massaco, along the Farmington River in Connecticut
- Nochpeem, in southern portions of present-day Dutchess and western and northern Putnam counties, New York. Their tribal fire at one point was in Kent.
- Paugussett, along the Housatonic River, present-day eastern Fairfield and western New Haven counties of Connecticut
- Podunk, east of the Connecticut River in eastern Hartford County, Connecticut
- Poquonock, western present-day Hartford County, Connecticut
- Quinnipiac, in central New Haven County, Connecticut
  - The Menunkatuck, were a sub-group of the Quinnipiac, living along the coast in present-day in Guilford in New Haven County, Connecticut.
- Sicaog, in present-day Hartford County, Connecticut
- Sintsink, also Sinsink, Sinck Sinck, and Sint Sinck, origin of the name of the penitentiary Sing Sing in Ossining, east of the Hudson River in present-day Westchester County, New York
- Siwanoy, southeast coastal Bronx as far as Hell Gate, and interior southernmost Westchester County, New York, into southwestern Fairfield County, Connecticut at the Five Mile River.
- Tankiteke, also "Pachami" and "Pachani", central coastal and extreme western Fairfield County, Connecticut, north to Danbury, north and west into northern Westchester County, New York, eastern Putnam County, New York and southeastern Dutchess County, New York
- Tunxis, Farmington, in southwestern Hartford County, Connecticut
- Wangunk, also sometimes called the "Mattabesset", they lived in the Mattabesset area in central Connecticut. Originally located around Hartford and Wethersfield, but were displaced by settlers and relocated to land around the oxbow bend in the Connecticut River.
- Wecquaesgeek (Wiechquaeskeck, Wickquasgeck, Weckquaesgeek), southwestern Westchester County, New York, originally centered on the mouth of the Saeck Kill in today's Yonkers, and ranging south into the western Bronx along the Hudson and Harlem rivers. Had hunting grounds on the northern three-quarters of Manhattan Island, and ranged north to present-day Tarrytown and Pocantico Hills.

While Edward Manning Ruttenber suggested in 1872 that there had been a Wappinger Confederacy, as did anthropologist James Mooney in 1910, Ives Goddard contests their view. He writes that no evidence supports this idea.

== Legacy ==
The Wappinger are the namesake of several areas in New York, including:

- Town of Wappinger
- Village of Wappingers Falls
- Wappinger Creek
- Wappinger Trail, Briarcliff Manor, New York

Broadway in New York City also follows their ancient trail.

== Notable Wappinger ==
- Abraham Nimham (1745–1778), captain in the Continental Army during the American Revolutionary War
- Daniel Nimham (1726–1778), sachem and member of the Stockbridge Militia in the American Revolutionary War

== Bibliography ==
- Goddard, Ives (1978). "Delaware". In Trigger, Bruce G. (ed.). Handbook of North American Indians: Northeast, Vol. 15. Washington, DC: Smithsonian Institution. pp. 213–39. ISBN 978-0-1600-4575-2.
- Hauptman, Laurence M. (2017). "The Road to Kingsbridge: Daniel Nimham and the Stockbridge Indian Company in the American Revolution". American Indian. 18 (3). Smithsonian's National Museum of the American Indian: 34–39.
- Sebeok, Thomas, ed. (1977). Native Languages of the Americas, Volume 2. Springer. p. 380. ISBN 978-1-4757-1562-0.
- Swanton, John Reed (1952). The Indian Tribes of North America. Baltimore, MD: Genealogical Books. ISBN 978-0-8063-1730-4.
