= Stockbridge Militia =

Native American military unit from 1775 to 1778

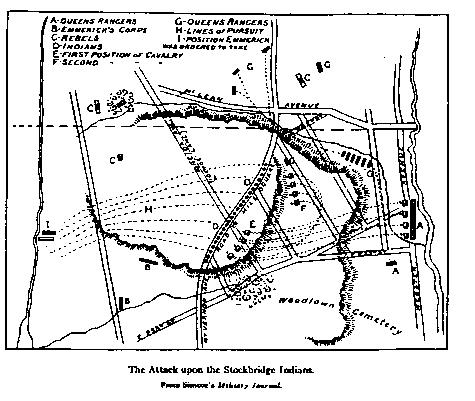
- Lt. Col. Simcoe's description of the battle. Woodlawn Cemetery is visible at bottom right.
- Active: 1775–1778
- Allegiance: United States
- Branch: John Nixon's Brigade, 8th Massachusetts Regiment, Massachusetts Militia, Continental Army
- Type: Conventional soldiers, scouts
- Role: Conventional 18th-century European warfare and scouting operations
- Engagements: American Revolutionary War; Siege of Boston; Capture of Fort Ticonderoga; Siege of Ticonderoga; Battle of Saratoga; Battle of Monmouth

Commanders
- Notable commanders: Major General Horatio Gates; Brigadier General John Nixon; Jehoiaikim Mtohksin (Stockbridge officer); Abraham Nimham (Stockbridge officer)

The Stockbridge Militia was a Native American military unit from Stockbridge, Massachusetts which served in the Continental Army during the American Revolutionary War. The militia unit was composed of Mohican, Wappinger, Munsee, Tunxis, Shawnee, and Housatonic people in the Stockbridge area. While most northeastern tribes, such as Joseph Brant's Mohawks, aligned themselves with the British, the Stockbridge tribes allied with the American Patriots. Led by Jehoiaikim Mtohksin and Abraham Nimham, they were the first group of Native Americans to fight for the cause of American independence during the Revolutionary War. They fought with the belief that their support of the American colonists would result in the protection of their lands and sovereignty. On the contrary, they were displaced from their ancestral lands.

== Early military service in Continental Army ==
In 1774, as the revolution began to get under way in Massachusetts, members of the Stockbridge tribes met at the Red Lion Inn to pledge their loyalty to the American cause:

Wherever your armies go, there we will go; you shall always find us by your side; and if providence calls us to sacrifice our Lives in the field of battle, we will fall where you fall, and lay our bones by yours. Nor shall peace ever be made between our nation and the Red-Coats until our brothers -the white people- lead the way.

This first incarnation of the militia served at the Siege of Boston and the Capture of Fort Ticonderoga in 1775. This militia disbanded soon thereafter, with some Indians returning to their homes and others continuing to serve as scouts for various units.

In 1777, a new militia was gradually formed as Stockbridge men from the 8th Massachusetts Regiment, Nixon's Brigade, and other units gathered under the command of Major General Horatio Gates. This new, loosely organized Stockbridge Militia, now part of the Continental Army, was led by Jehoiaikim Mtohksin. Abraham Nimham, the son of famed Wappinger sachem Daniel Nimham, joined the unit as Mtohksin's second-in-command. From 1777 to 1778 they participated in the Siege of Ticonderoga, the Battle of Saratoga, and the Battle of Monmouth.

== The Stockbridge Massacre ==
In August 1778, the Stockbridge Militia was stationed at an outpost in what is now the Bronx, just north of Manhattan. They were attached to a newly formed Light Infantry Corps commanded by Continental Army general Mordecai Gist. The Queen's Rangers, a Loyalist military unit under the command of Lieutenant Colonel John Graves Simcoe, led an attack on the Stockbridge Militia in what became known as the Battle of Kingsbridge, Battle of Cortlandt Ridge, Battle of Van Cortlandt's Woods, or the Stockbridge Massacre. The Queen's Rangers were developed from Rogers' Rangers, a provincial unit in which many Stockbridge Indians had served during the French and Indian War.

The battle took place in the northeast of today's Van Cortlandt Park, in an area known today as "Indian Field" about one mile north of Kingsbridge in today's Bronx. The Queen's Rangers led a cavalry charge against the Stockbridge Militia, scattering the unit. By most accounts roughly 40 Stockbridge Militia were killed in the battle, while the Queen's Rangers suffered comparatively light casualties, with 1 cavalryman killed and 3 wounded. Due to the chaos of the battle, the Stockbridge Militia did not bury their casualties, though local residents quickly combed over the battlefield and buried any bodies they found.

== Physical appearance of Stockbridge soldier ==
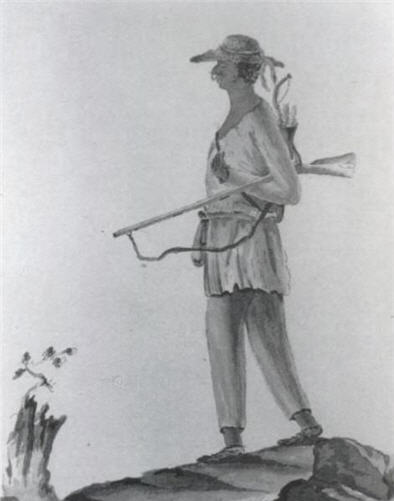
Von Ewald sketch of a Stockbridge warrior

After the fighting, Hessian captain Johann Von Ewald sketched a Stockbridge warrior based on one of the dead who had been left behind. The picture is the only known contemporary depiction of a Revolutionary-era Stockbridge militiaman. Von Ewald described the Indian casualties after his examination:

Their costume was a shirt of coarse linen down to the knees, long trousers also of linen down to the feet, on which they wore shoes of deerskin, and the head was covered with a hat made of bast. Their weapons were a rifle or musket, a quiver with some twenty arrows, and a short battle-axe, which they know how to throw very skillfully. Through the nose and in the ears they wore rings, and on their heads only the hair of the crown remained standing in a circle the size of a dollar-piece, the remainder being shaved off bare. They pull out with pincers all the hairs of the beard, as well as those on all other parts of the body.

The bodies of the Indians were left on the battlefield. Soon after, local residents discovered the corpses being scavenged by dogs, and they buried them in a mass grave. By the 19th century the spirit of their sachem was said to haunt the land of "Indian Field".

== Heavy losses and end of military service ==
That engagement was the last of the war for the militia; Abraham's father, Daniel Nimham, was the last hereditary sachem of the Wappinger, and the other casualties represented a significant loss to the total population of the tribe back in Massachusetts. Requesting leave to return home to help the families of the dead, the company was paid $1,000.00 for their service and discharged by order of George Washington in September 1778.

== Post war years of Stockbridge veterans ==
=== Shays' Rebellion, tribal suffrage, and tribal removal ===
After the survivors returned to Stockbridge, they were not recognized for their service and instead faced harassment at home. Indigenous communities struggled to maintain their land because during their absence -- it had been sold or taken through debts, mortgages, or fraud. White settlers grew to exclude Indigenous peoples from community council and from acquiring land. By 1783, Mohican people had their land ownership taken away.

By the time of Shays's Rebellion much of the Indian community at Stockbridge had left for the Brothertown community in New York. According to the historian Patrick Frazier, "The remaining Stockbridges appear not to have participated in the agrarian fray; if they had, it is hard to say which side they would have taken, since they had friends on both." It has been suggested that their service during the American Revolution created strong support for Indian suffrage, in the new Commonwealth of Massachusetts; although article five of the first draft, of the state's new constitution, excluded Indians, as eligible voters, it was soundly defeated and the second draft gave all men the right to vote.

Most of the Indian survivors eventually settled in Oneida County, New York and were later moved to Wisconsin, forming the Stockbridge-Munsee tribal reservation.
