= Abraham Nimham =

18th-century American soldier

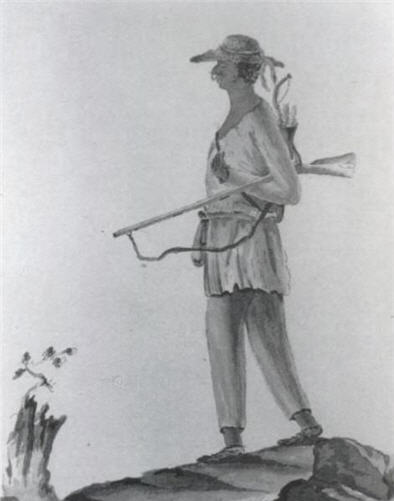
A member of the Stockbridge Militia.

Abraham Nimham (c. 1745 – August 31, 1778) was a Native American man who was the son of sachem and emissary Daniel Nimham, and himself a Wappinger leader. During the Revolutionary War, he served with his father in the Stockbridge Militia, often accompanying him on diplomatic and recruiting missions.

Nimham was commissioned a captain, and was given command of a detachment of sixty Stockbridge and River Indian soldiers. On April 28, 1778, Nimham and his father joined the Continental Army at White Plains, New York.

On August 31, 1778, both Abraham and Daniel Nimham were ambushed and killed by a ranger patrol under the command of John Graves Simcoe during the Battle of Kingsbridge at Cortlandt Ridge.
