= Barry Ninham =

Australian physicist

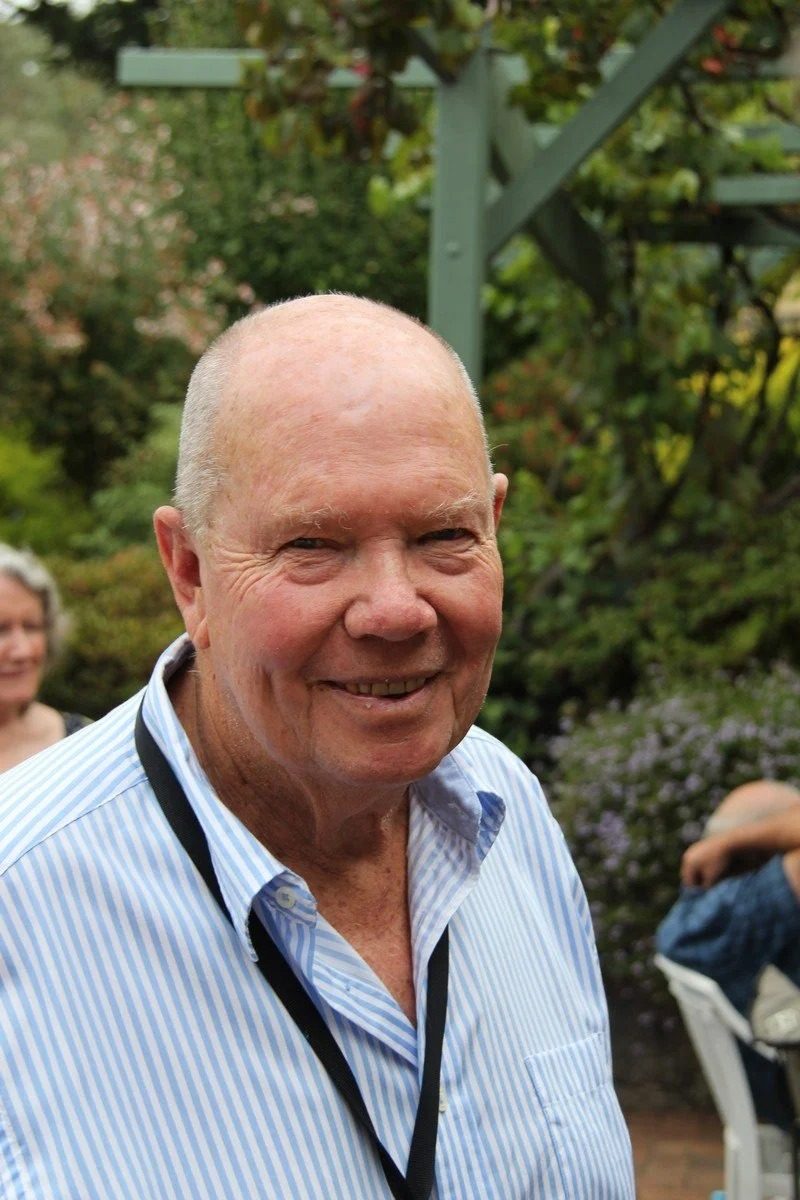
Barry Ninham

Barry William Ninham AO DSc FAA (born 9 April 1936, Croydon, South Australia – present) is an Australian physicist who has received many awards for his research.

Barry Ninham attended Guildford Grammar School in Perth from 1945 to 1952. He then studied at University of Western Australia where he received an M.Sc. in theoretical physics in 1957. In 1962, he received a Ph.D. in mathematical physics from University of Maryland, doing research in statistical mechanics with Elliott W. Montroll as thesis advisor.

From 1962 to 1970 he was lecturer, senior lecturer and finally associate professor at the Department of Applied Mathematics of the University of New South Wales. In 1970 he became professor of the newly formed Department of Applied Mathematics at the Institute of Advanced Studies of the Australian National University.

Ninham was elected a Fellow of the Australian Academy of Science in 1978, appointed an Officer of the Order of Australia in 2014, and awarded the Matthew Flinders Medal and Lecture in 2016.

== Publications ==
- Random and Restricted Walks: Theory and Application, M. Barber, B. W. Ninham, Gordon & Breach, New York (1970), 176pp. ISBN 067702620X
- Dispersion Forces, J. Mahanty, B. W. Ninham, Academic Press, London and New York (1976), 236pp. ISBN 0124650503
- The Mathematics and Physics of Disordered Media: Percolation, Random Walk, Modeling, and Simulation, Editors: B. D. Hughes & B. W. Ninham, Springer, (1983) Volume 1035. ISBN 978-3-540-12707-9 (Print) 978-3-540-38693-3 (Online)
- The Language of Shape, S. T. Hyde, S. Andersson, K. Larsson, S. Lidin, T. Landh, Z. Blum and B. W. Ninham, Elsevier Science B.V. Amsterdam (1997), 470pp
- Molecular Forces and Self Assembly: in Colloid, Nano Sciences and Biology, B. W. Ninham & P. Lonostro, Cambridge Molecular Science, Cambridge University Press (2010), 365pp. ISBN 9780521896009
- Aqua Incognita, Why Ice Floats on Water and Galileo 400 Years on, Editors, P. Lonostro & B. W. Ninham, Connor Court publishers Ballarat, Victoria (2014), 505pp. ISBN 1925138216
- Interaction of Particles in Colloidal Dispersions: a collection of papers based on the lectures presented at the IUTAM-IUPAC Symposium, Canberra, March 1981, Advances in Colloid & Interface Science, (1982), vol. 16, ISSN 0001-8686 (Elsevier, Amsterdam) B. W. Ninham, J. T. G. Overbeek, A. C. Zettlemoyer
- Colloids and Surfaces A: Physicochemical and Engineering Aspects, Volumes 129–130, Pages 1–458 (30 November 1997) in honour of Prof. B. W. Ninham Edited by S. Hyde Elsevier
- Current Opinion in Colloid and Interface Science, (2004), vol 9 (1-2), 1-198. Editors: W. Kunz, P. Lonostro and B. W. Ninham Elsevier publishers ISSN: 1359 -0294
