= Sequassen =

17th-century Wangunk sachem at Hartford, Connecticut

Sachem of Suckiaug (Wangunk)

Personal details
- Born: Unknown
- Died: Before 1670
- Relations: Wawarme (sister); Miantonomi (brother-in-law)
- Parent: Sowheag (Sequin), Wangunk grand sachem (father)
- Known for: Sale of the land that became Hartford (1636) and of the Tunxis country in the Farmington Valley (1640)
- Residence: Suckiaug (now Hartford); for a time Mattaneag (now Windsor)
- Other names: Sequasson, Sunckquasson

Sequassen (fl. 1633–1657; died before 1670), also recorded as Sequasson and Sunckquasson, (Note: The name appears in many spellings in colonial records. Roger Williams wrote it "Souwonckquawsin" in 1637, and the records of the Connecticut Colony use forms such as "Sunckquasson" and "Saquassen". The court records also give "Saqueston" (1640) and "Seoquassen" (1656). A Dutch record of 1649 calls him "Sonquassen", and J. Hammond Trumbull gives "Sasawin" as an alias. Older histories sometimes confused him with his father, Sowheag, who was also known as "Sequin" or "Sequeen".) was a Wangunk sachem of Suckiaug (also spelled Saukiog or Sicaog), the Native village at what is now Hartford, Connecticut. He was a son of the Wangunk grand sachem Sowheag (also called Sequin). English colonial sources identify him as the sachem from whom the founders of Hartford obtained their land in 1636, and as the seller of the Tunxis country in the Farmington Valley in 1640. During the 1640s he was a rival of the Mohegan sachem Uncas, a conflict that contributed to the war between Uncas and the Narragansett sachem Miantonomi. Defeated by Uncas in 1643, Sequassen spent several years in exile in present-day Massachusetts and returned in 1650 at the request of the Mohawk. Uncas objected to his restoration, but by 1656 the two sachems were acting together in a dispute with the Podunk.

== Family ==
Sequassen was the son of Sowheag, the grand sachem of the Wangunk (an Algonquian-speaking people whose villages lined the central Connecticut River), who lived first at Pyquag (Wethersfield) and later at Mattabesset (Middletown). (Note: Sowheag was described as "the late Sequeen" in a Dutch report of 1649, and is generally said to have died about that year.) In a letter of July 1637 to John Winthrop, Roger Williams called him "old Sequins Sonn", and a Dutch report of 1649 names him as "the son of the late Sequeen". According to the historian Katherine Hermes, Sowheag succeeded his father, Altarbaenhoot, as grand sachem; Altarbaenhoot probably died in an epidemic in 1634. (Note: The name Altarbaenhoot comes from the 1633 Dutch deed for the House of Hope, which says that "Sequeen" was to live beside the Dutch post at the request of "the sachem Altarbaenhoet, and all interested tribes". Trumbull and Ives identify the Altarbaenhoet of the deed with Natawanute, sachem of Matianuck in present-day Windsor.) Hermes describes Sequassen as apparently Sowheag's eldest son, who often negotiated with the English and the Dutch. Sowheag's other children included Wawarme, Sepunnamo, Towkishke, Seacutt, Turramuggus, Montowese and Wesumpsha.

His sister Wawarme (also Warwarme or Wawaloam) was Sowheag's eldest daughter. She married Miantonomi, (Note: Records generally call Miantonomi's wife Wawaloam, and scholars differ about whether Wawarme and Wawaloam were the same person, although all agree that Miantonomi and Sequassen were closely linked by kinship.) and in 1670 she was described as "the sister and onely heire of Sunckquasson". (Note: Other kin were also treated as heirs. Seacutt, another son of Sowheag, is named among Sequassen's heirs in the Farmington confirmatory deed of 1673.) The anthropologist Timothy Ives, citing the 1933 account of Mathias Spiess, writes that she ruled the Suckiaug community as sunksquaw (a female sachem) alongside her brother. In 1643 Miantonomi justified his attack on Uncas by claiming Sequassen as a relative. No child of Sequassen is named in the records, but the historian Thomas Wickman, of Trinity College, cites letters of 1647 showing that a daughter of his had lived "in servitude or slavery" in Rhode Island, and that Sequassen and her uncle had taken her back to Connecticut against the wishes of Captain Robert Morris of Portsmouth.

Altarbaenhoot (grand sachem, d. c. 1634)
Sowheag (Sequin) (grand sachem, d. c. 1649)
Miantonomi	Wawarme	Sequassen	Sepunnamo	Towkishke	Seacutt	Turramuggus	Montowese	Wesumpsha

Shaded boxes show his direct line of descent, and the dashed line marks a marriage. The birth order of Sowheag's children is not known. (Note: Sowheag's descent from Altarbaenhoot follows Hermes. The list of Sowheag's children follows the Native Northeast Portal, Spiess and Hermes. Hermes and Maravel identify Sepunnamo as a daughter. The records name no children of Sequassen, although Wickman cites evidence of an unnamed daughter. When the Hartford sale was confirmed in 1670, his sister Wawarme was described as his "only heir". These sources do not say whether Wesumpsha was a son or a daughter.)

== Sachem of Suckiaug ==
Wangunk villages at the time of English settlement
1	Poquonnoc (Windsor Locks)
2	Matianuck and Mattacomacok (Windsor)
3	Suckiaug (Hartford; Sequassen's community)
4	Pyquag (Wethersfield; first seat of Sowheag)
5	Nayaug and Naubuc (Glastonbury)
6	Wangunk (Portland; the village at the bend that gave the Wangunk their name)
7	Mattabesek (Middletown; later seat of Sowheag)
8	Coginchaug (Durham)
9	Cockaponset (Haddam)
10	Pattyquonk and Machemoodus (East Haddam)
11	Cossonnacock (near the old Haddam–Lyme line; approximate)

Village list after Lavin; markers show the modern towns named in that list, not exact village sites. Red marks Sequassen's community; green marks the village of Wangunk, which gave the people their name. (Note: Lavin places Cossonnacock in the "Haddam/Lyme area", and Swanton "near the line between the towns of Haddam and Lyme"; its marker is placed at Hadlyme and is approximate.)

Suckiaug was the Native village at what is now Hartford. It was one of more than a dozen villages of the Wangunk, an Algonquian-speaking people who lived along both banks of the Connecticut River from present-day Windsor Locks south to East Haddam, a distance of about 34 miles (55 km). Their name, which means "bend", comes from their village at the great bend of the river in present-day Portland.

Each Wangunk village had its own sachem. The archaeologist Lucianne Lavin, of the Institute for American Indian Studies, writes that early Dutch and English records show the villages united under a grand sachem, in the 1630s Sowheag, whose sons, daughters and other kin were the sachems of individual villages. Other evidence points to looser ties. The nineteenth-century historian John W. De Forest noted that the same names appear on Native deeds from Windsor to Middletown, but also that in later years "the little sagamores sold land and performed other acts of sovereignty on their own authority". In a study of seventeenth-century land deeds, Ives found decisions made by group consensus, women among the recognized holders of land rights, and individuals whose standing extended across several communities through kinship and marriage.

Sequassen, the sachem of Suckiaug, was one of Sowheag's sons; Hermes describes him as apparently the eldest, who often conducted negotiations with the English and the Dutch. He did not succeed his father as grand sachem: the historian J. Hammond Trumbull names Turramuggus as Sowheag's successor. Even so, colonial records called Sequassen "the chief sachem" when he sold land well beyond Suckiaug, in the Farmington Valley.

Several neighboring peoples claimed authority over the Wangunk villages at different times: the Pequot, who claimed the valley by conquest before 1633; the Narragansett, whose sachem Miantonomi was Sequassen's brother-in-law; and the Mohegan sachem Uncas, who after defeating Sequassen in 1643 claimed his country by conquest. Ives describes Sequassen and Uncas as competing during the 1640s "for political power within the Native community and for the favor of colonial authorities".

== Early life and the Pequot War ==
The Dutch based their claim to land at Hartford on a 1633 purchase from the Pequot sachem Wapyquart (Tatobem), who held the valley by conquest; Sequassen's name does not appear in that deed. In July 1640 Sequassen testified before the Connecticut court that he had never sold land to the Dutch, had never been conquered by the Pequots or paid them tribute, and had at one time lived at Mattaneag in present-day Windsor. (Note: The 1633 Dutch deed allowed an exiled sachem called "Sequeen" to return; Ives identifies him as Sowheag. John W. De Forest (1851) took "Sequeen" to be Sequassen, an identification followed by Sylvester (1910) and Bradstreet (1933), but a Dutch report of 1649 calls Sequassen "the son of the late Sequeen".) In 1633 he was named with the sachem Natawanute as one of the "rightful owners" of the land at Matianuck (Windsor) sold to the Plymouth traders. During the Pequot War, Roger Williams reported in July 1637 that Sequassen had intercepted twenty Pequot women and children who were fleeing toward the Mohawk.

== Land transactions ==
The English settlers who founded Hartford acquired the Suckiaug lands from Sequassen in 1635 or 1636. The grantees were Samuel Stone and William Goodwin, acting for the town's proprietors. The deed is believed to have reserved land in the South Meadow, near the Dutch post, for the Native community. Sequassen later renewed the grant to John Haynes and the first magistrates and extended it westward. The original deed is lost. The 1670 confirmation says that Sequassen had granted the land "by a writeing under his hand", running north from a marked tree on the Wethersfield line to the Windsor bounds, and from the Connecticut River "into the wilderness towards the west full six miles". It adds that the grant was made with the consent of the inhabitants, "in presence of many of the natives of the place and English inhabitants". (Note: Sylvester states that the English bought the same territory a second time in 1640, "evidently with the intention of putting the Indians into better humor".)

The confirmation, dated July 5, 1670, refers to "our predecessor Sunckquasson" and does not bear his mark. Maussecup (Masseeckcup), whom Hermes and Maravel identify as the son of Miantonomi and Wawarme, and William squa signed "in behalf of ourselves and Wawarme the sister and onely heire of Sunckquasson", together with Keepequam, Seacutt, Jack Spiner, Currecombe, Wehassatuck squa and Seacunck squa, described as "the onely inhabitants that are surviving". In return for "a further gratification", they confirmed the land to Samuel Willys, John Talcott, James Richards and John Allyn on behalf of the Hartford proprietors. According to the historian Charles W. Burpee, when the deed was confirmed the proprietors were taxed to pay the surviving Native people the value of their holdings in the South Meadow. The historian David M. Powers groups the 1670 deed with other later "renewal" deeds in New England that are conventional English property transfers, and writes that such deeds "seem to have been made—or perhaps better, made up—retroactively". Most of that land had passed out of Native hands by 1723, and the remaining members of the Suckiaug community later joined the Tunxis at Farmington.

Sequassen also appeared before the colony's court in ordinary disputes. In September 1639 the settler Richard Lyman complained that Sequassen had burned his hedge and had not paid the damages he had earlier promised before the governor. Sequassen appeared and promised to pay within four days; otherwise the court would order his goods seized. (Note: Isaac W. Stuart's 1851 account names the injured settler as Andrew Warner; the court record names Richard Lyman.)

=== Farmington ===
West of Hartford lay the country of the Tunxis, whose main village stood at a bend of the Farmington River near present-day Farmington. According to the 1670 deed, Sequassen enlarged his Hartford grant westward "so far as his country went", and when Farmington was settled in 1640, a writing between the English and Pethus, "the sachem or gentleman of that place", made "full mention" of Sequassen's grant. The English treated these transactions as covering the whole Tunxis country, about 300 square miles. Although his own village was Suckiaug, the Farmington town records call him "the chief sachem" and state that the magistrates "bought the whole country to the Mohawks country" from him. Older historians accepted this description. De Forest wrote that the Tunxis "were, at an early period, subject to Sequassen", and Trumbull called them "a branch of the tribe of which Sequasson was chief sachem". The anthropologist Kenneth Feder writes that the English believed a ruler could sign away the land of subordinate groups, and that Sequassen regarded himself as leader of several such groups, including the Tunxis. The Tunxis, none of whom signed the deed, believed they had only agreed to let the English live among them. (Note: John R. Swanton listed the Tunxis as a sachemship separate from both Sicaog (Suckiaug) and the Wangunk.) Wickman likewise writes that Sequassen "may not have been fully authorized" to sell the Tunxis lands. By the time of a new agreement in April 1650, De Forest writes, "Sequassen's authority was now of no account", and the Tunxis leaders Pethus and Ahamo negotiated for themselves, keeping a reserved tract at Indian Neck, in Farmington south of present-day Route 4. (Note: Accounts of the reserved acreage differ. Feder gives about 90 to 100 acres at Indian Neck; De Forest writes that the Tunxis reserved about 170 acres of Indian Neck and received a further 200 acres on the other side of the Farmington River.)

== Conflict with Uncas ==
In August 1642 Native informants told the English of an alleged plan by Miantonomi, Sowheag and Sequassen to attack the English settlements. No attack took place. In the early 1640s Sequassen's warriors killed a leading Mohegan, and others shot arrows at Uncas as he traveled by canoe down the Connecticut River. Uncas demanded six of Sequassen's men in compensation. Governor John Haynes persuaded him to accept only the killer, but Sequassen refused to surrender him, because the man was a relative and favorite of Miantonomi. The magistrates then left Uncas free to take his own revenge. In 1643 Uncas attacked Sequassen at Suckiaug, killing seven or eight of his warriors and wounding thirteen, burning wigwams and carrying off plunder. Haynes then had to assure Miantonomi that the English had not been involved. Miantonomi's retaliation against Uncas ended in his capture and execution later that year. In 1664 Major John Mason testified before the Connecticut General Court that Uncas had driven "Sunckquasson [Sequassen] and his men out of theire country in a just warre".

=== Alleged plot, 1646 ===
De Forest's account of an alleged plot of 1646 draws on the records of the Commissioners of the United Colonies. In the spring of 1646 Sequassen and Watchibrok, a Potatuck man, were staying together at Waranoke (Westfield). According to Watchibrok, Sequassen gave him wampum and asked him to kill Haynes, Edward Hopkins and William Whiting at Hartford. The two would then flee to the Mohawk, spreading word that Uncas was responsible, "and Sequassen would have a chance to rise again". Watchibrok instead revealed the plan to the Hartford magistrates.

Sequassen ignored a summons to Hartford and, despite an offer of safe conduct, did not appear before the Commissioners of the United Colonies at New Haven. Two sagamores, Nepinsoit and Naimataique, who said they were his friends, told the Commissioners that, "having been a great sachem once, and now being poor", he was ashamed to come without a present. He took refuge among the Pocumtuc at Deerfield, where Uncas's warriors seized him at the colonists' request. Sequassen was held in prison at Hartford for several weeks and released when nothing was proved against him.

De Forest cautioned that the story "rest[s] almost wholly upon the evidence of Watchibrok", whom he called "unquestionably a liar and a villain". Spiess (1933) and the historian Albert E. Van Dusen (1961) suggested that Uncas himself may have been behind the plot. (Note: Charles Cuningham (1939), following Benjamin Trumbull, describes the same plot without naming the sachem. Sylvester's version differs, describing a plot with a Potatuck man to kill Uncas himself.)

== Later life ==
After his defeat by Uncas in 1643, Sequassen lived in exile among allies at Waranoke (Westfield) and among the Pocumtuc people at Pocumtuck (Deerfield), in present-day Massachusetts. Both communities belonged to a loose alliance of about a dozen Connecticut Valley villages sometimes called the Pocumtuck. The Pocumtuc resented Uncas's seizure of Sequassen from their territory after the 1646 accusation, and in August 1648, with wampum from the Narragansett and Niantic, they gathered warriors at Pocumtuck to attack Uncas. In 1650 the Mohawk asked the Commissioners of the United Colonies to allow Sequassen to return home. The Commissioners replied that they had never forbidden his return provided he behaved inoffensively, but formally granted the request.

Sequassen's restoration was contested. In 1651 Uncas complained to the Commissioners that Sequassen was being "set up" as "a great Sachem", although he had refused to pay the wampum he owed Uncas "as his conqueror". Uncas said that he had "conquered his country", given it to the English, and not opposed their decision to spare Sequassen's life. The Commissioners disclaimed any effort "to make Sequassen greate" but asked Connecticut to examine Uncas's claim, and the Connecticut General Court declared that it did not allow or approve his being "exhalted ... to great Sachemship".

By 1656 Sequassen and Uncas were acting together. After a man of the Podunk, the Native community on the east side of the river in present-day East Hartford and South Windsor, killed a Mattabesset sagamore who was Sequassen's relative, Sequassen and Uncas's councillor Foxen brought the case before the magistrates at Hartford. The Podunk sachem Tontonimo withdrew to the Podunk fort, which the local historian Joseph O. Goodwin placed at Fort Hill on the Hockanum River in present-day East Hartford. The Podunk eventually surrendered the killer.

Sequassen was still living in 1657, and nothing is recorded of him after the Podunk dispute. The date of his death is not known, but he had died by July 1670, when the confirmation of the Hartford sale called him "our predecessor". Ives summarizes that, like his father, Sequassen "had been defeated by the Mohegans, temporarily exiled, and returned to his former domain to find a more powerful colonial government".

== Remembrance ==
Hermes writes that the Wangunk "remain largely erased from Connecticut history", even though they were "the people who allowed the English to settle in Hartford". She notes that with no Wangunk tribal nation surviving as an organized entity, there is no central repository for their records, and that historians did not trace Wangunk genealogy as they did for the Mohegan or Narragansett, so that members of Sowheag's family "appeared in history books almost as if out of nowhere". Wangunk descendants still live in the region.

Several places and organizations in Connecticut have borne Sequassen's name:

- Sequassen Street in Hartford's South Meadow, part of the area developed by Samuel Colt and now within Coltsville. Originally South Meadow Highway No. 5, it was named for Sequassen as the grantor of the first Hartford deed. Nearby streets were named for signers of the 1670 confirmation: Wawarme Avenue for his sister, Masseek Street for her son Maussecup, Curcombe Street and Weehassat Street. (Note: The Municipal Art Society credits Samuel Colt with the street names and dates the confirmatory deed to 1671; the deed itself is dated July 5, 1670.)
- Sequassen Lodge No. 74 of the Independent Order of Odd Fellows in Plainville.
- Sequassen Road in Farmington.
- Camp Sequassen, a Boy Scouts of America camp of the Connecticut Yankee Council on West Hill Pond in Winsted.

== Works cited ==
=== Books and articles ===
- Adams, Sherman W. (1886). "Settlement of the Town". In Trumbull, J. Hammond (ed.). The Memorial History of Hartford County, Connecticut, 1633–1884 (PDF). Vol. 1. Boston: Edward L. Osgood.
- Bradstreet, Howard (1933). The Story of the War with the Pequots, Re-Told. Tercentenary Commission of the State of Connecticut, Committee on Historical Publications. New Haven: Yale University Press.
- Burpee, Charles W. (1928). History of Hartford County, Connecticut, 1633–1928. Vol. 1. Chicago: S. J. Clarke.
- Cuningham, Charles E. (1939). "John Haynes of Connecticut". The New England Quarterly. 12 (4): 654–680. JSTOR 360448.
- De Forest, John W. (1851). History of the Indians of Connecticut from the Earliest Known Period to 1850. Hartford: Wm. Jas. Hamersley.
- Feder, Ken (Spring 2026). "The First People of the Farmington Valley". Estuary.
- Goodwin, Nathaniel (1845). The Descendants of Thomas Olcott, One of the First Settlers of Hartford, Connecticut. Hartford: Case, Tiffany and Burnham. Appendix, pp. 62–63.
- Goodwin, Joseph O. (1879). East Hartford: Its History and Traditions. Hartford.
- Hermes, Katherine; Maravel, Alexandra (2017). "Finding the Onepennys Among the Wongunk". Bulletin of the Archaeological Society of Connecticut (79): 95–109.
- Hermes, Katherine (March 25, 2019). "Repairing Hartford's indigenous past". History@Work. National Council on Public History.
- Ives, Timothy Howlett (2001). Wangunk Ethnohistory: A Case Study of a Connecticut River Indian Community (M.A. thesis). College of William & Mary. doi:10.21220/s2-xcrv-vp43.
- Ives, Timothy H. (2009). "Expressions of Community: Reconstructing Native Identity in Seventeenth-Century Central Connecticut through Land Deed Analysis". In Dunn, Shirley W. (ed.). Mohican Seminar 3: The Journey – An Algonquian Peoples Seminar. New York State Museum Bulletin 511. Albany: University of the State of New York. pp. 25–38.
- Lavin, Lucianne (2017). "Pre-Colonial History of the Wangunk". Bulletin of the Archaeological Society of Connecticut (79): 41–48.
- "Seacutt". Native Northeast Portal.
- "Sowheage, - 1649". Native Northeast Portal.
- Powers, David M. (Summer 2017). "William Pynchon, the Agawam Indians, and the 1636 Deed for Springfield". Historical Journal of Massachusetts. 45 (2): 144–167.
- Trumbull, J. Hammond, ed. (1850). The Public Records of the Colony of Connecticut, Prior to the Union with New Haven Colony, May, 1665. Hartford: Brown & Parsons.
- Municipal Art Society of Hartford (1911). History of Hartford Streets. Bulletin No. 9. Hartford – via hartford.omaxfield.com.
- Spiess, Mathias (1933). The Indians of Connecticut. Tercentenary Commission of the State of Connecticut, Committee on Historical Publications. New Haven: Yale University Press.
- Swanton, John R. (1952). The Indian Tribes of North America. Bureau of American Ethnology Bulletin 145. Washington, D.C.: Government Printing Office.
- Sylvester, Herbert Milton (1910). Indian Wars of New England. Vol. 1. Boston: W. B. Clarke Company.
- Trumbull, J. Hammond (1886). "The Indians of Hartford County". In Trumbull, J. Hammond (ed.). The Memorial History of Hartford County, Connecticut, 1633–1884 (PDF). Vol. 1. Boston: Edward L. Osgood.
- Van Dusen, Albert E. (1961). Connecticut. New York: Random House.
- Wickman, Thomas (Spring 2021). "Our Best Places: Gender, Food Sovereignty, and Miantonomi's Kin on the Connecticut River". Early American Studies. 19 (2): 215–263. JSTOR 27077831.

=== Newspapers ===
- "Assessments for Cost of Setting New Curb and Setting Curb on Sequassen Street". Hartford Courant. January 22, 1918. p. 15 – via Newspapers.com.
- "Street Names Reflect Time's Passage". Hartford Courant. April 17, 1995.
- Feder, Kenneth L. (September 4, 1992). "Pequots' victory is a rare one for the Indians of New England". Hartford Courant. p. D13 – via Newspapers.com.
- "Sequassen Lodge Greets Officers". New Britain Herald. December 19, 1930. p. 9 – via Newspapers.com.
- Scæva [Isaac W. Stuart] (January 29, 1851). "Hartford: Its Purchase—Its Distribution and Plan. No. 3". Hartford Courant. p. 2 – via Newspapers.com.
- Shedd, Ian (August 2, 1998). "Memories of Sequassen long-lasting". New Haven Register. p. 3 – via Newspapers.com.
