= Sowheag =

17th-century Wangunk grand sachem in Connecticut

Grand sachem of the Wangunk
- Preceded by: Altarbaenhoot
- Succeeded by: Turramuggus

Personal details
- Born: Unknown
- Died: Before 1650
- Children: Sequassen; Wawarme; Turramuggus; Sepunnamo
- Known for: Land grants to the founders of Wethersfield and Middletown; dispute with Wethersfield, 1637–1639
- Other names: Sequin, Sequeen

Sowheag (fl. 1633–1642; died before 1650), also called Sequin or Sequeen, (Note: English records give the name as Sowheag, Sowheage, Soheage and Suheage. The nineteenth-century historian John W. De Forest considered "Sequin" a title, "another version of the word sachem or king", rather than a personal name. The Dutch used "Sequin" or "Sequeen" both for the people of the central Connecticut River valley and for their chief sachem.) was a grand sachem of the Wangunk, an Algonquian-speaking people of the central Connecticut River valley in present-day Connecticut. He lived first at Pyquag, where he sold land to the English settlers who founded Wethersfield, and later at Mattabesset, where he granted the land that became Middletown. After the Wethersfield settlers drove him from Pyquag, the English suspected him of helping the Pequot attack the town in 1637, and for several years Connecticut treated him as an enemy, although recent historians doubt that he was involved. His children included Sequassen, the sachem at Hartford; Wawarme, whom some historians identify as the wife of the Narragansett sachem Miantonomi; and his successor, Turramuggus. In 1673 the town of Middletown confirmed a reservation of 300 acres at Wangunk for his heirs and the Mattabesset community, in present-day Portland.

== Names and identity ==
The Dutch navigator Adriaen Block, who sailed up the Connecticut River in 1614, called the people of the central valley the "Sequins". The historian J. Hammond Trumbull writes that Dutch records used the name for both the people and their chief sachem, and that "the Chief Sequeen" from whom the Dutch bought land in 1633 was probably the man the English knew as Sowheag or Sequin.

Since the mid-nineteenth century, historians have treated Sequin and Sowheag as one man, who moved from Pyquag to Mattabesset; the English used the name Sowheag more often after 1637. (Note: Two older errors are sometimes repeated. Benjamin Trumbull, in his 1797 history of Connecticut, made Sequin of Pyquag and Sowheag of Mattabesset two different sachems. De Forest, who corrected that error in 1851, himself identified the Dutch "Sequeen" with Sowheag's son Sequassen, although a Dutch report of 1649 calls Sequassen "the son of the late Sequeen".)

According to the historian Katherine Hermes, a former chair of the history department at Central Connecticut State University, Sowheag succeeded his father, Altarbaenhoot, as grand sachem; Altarbaenhoot probably died in an epidemic in 1634. (Note: The name Altarbaenhoot comes from the 1633 Dutch deed for the House of Hope, which says that "Sequeen" was to live beside the Dutch post at the request of "the sachem Altarbaenhoet, and all interested tribes". Trumbull and Ives identify the Altarbaenhoet of the deed with Natawanute, sachem of Matianuck in present-day Windsor.)

== Grand sachem ==
Places in Sowheag's life
1	Suckiaug (Hartford; village of his son Sequassen)
2	Pyquag (Wethersfield; Sowheag's first seat)
3	Mattabesset (Middletown; his later seat, with a fort at Indian Hill, now Indian Hill Cemetery)
4	Wangunk Reservation (Portland; laid out in 1673 for his heirs)
5	Thirty Mile Island (Haddam; where his daughter Towkishke was sunksquaw)

Red marks Sowheag's two seats; green marks the reservation set aside for his heirs. Markers show modern towns or landmarks and are approximate.

The archaeologist Lucianne Lavin, of the Institute for American Indian Studies, writes that early Dutch and English records show "a strong central Wangunk government residing in the grand sachem Sowheag and his sons, daughters, and other kin, who were sachems of the various Wangunk villages". Trumbull describes the Sequins' territory as running along both sides of the river from northern Haddam to Windsor. The anthropologist Timothy Ives is more cautious. He argues that the idea of the Wangunk as a single tribe under central leadership began with the nineteenth-century historian John W. De Forest, and that connected leadership among neighboring communities "does not mean they were under central leadership".

Before 1633 the Pequot defeated the Sequins "after three different battles, in open field", according to Wouter van Twiller, director of New Netherland from 1633 to 1638, and probably gained greater control of the valley's fur trade. In June 1633 the Dutch bought land at Suckiaug (now Hartford) from the Pequot sachem Wapyquart (Tatobem) for the trading post later called the House of Hope. The deed provided that "Sequeen should dwell with us", which Ives reads as allowing a former chief sachem of the Sequins, previously exiled, to return. A smallpox epidemic in the winter and spring of 1633–1634 killed a large part of the Sequin population.

== Pyquag (Wethersfield) ==
When English settlers from Massachusetts Bay arrived at Pyquag in 1634, Sowheag was living there as sachem. No deed of his sale to them survives. In 1665 the surveyor George Hubbard certified that "Wethersfield men gaue so much unto Sowheag as was to his satisfaction for all their plantations", a tract six miles wide along both sides of the river, running six miles west and three miles east of it.

According to Governor John Winthrop, Sowheag had given the English land on condition "that he might sit down by them, and be protected". When he set up his wigwam at Wethersfield, the settlers "drave him away by force", and he moved to Mattabesset.

== Mattabesset (Middletown) ==
At Mattabesset, Sowheag is said to have had a fort on the high ground west of the present city of Middletown, at a place later called Indian Hill, now the site of Indian Hill Cemetery. The quarrel with Wethersfield continued after his move. On April 23, 1637, during the Pequot War, the Pequot attacked Wethersfield, killing six men and three women and carrying off two girls. The English believed that Sowheag, "not being of strength to repair this injury by open force", had secretly called in the Pequot. The documentary record gives no proof of this, and recent historians regard his part in the attack as doubtful. Connecticut asked the magistrates and elders of Massachusetts Bay for advice. They replied that if the settlers had wronged him first, Sowheag was entitled under "the law of nations" to right himself "either by force or fraud".

In April 1638 the Connecticut General Court found that both sides had committed "divers outrages & wronges", but that "the first breach was on the saide English pte". It forgave all past wrongs, received Sowheag "againe ... in Amytie", and sent Samuel Stone, William Goodwin and Thomas Stanton to settle matters with him. The peace did not last: in August 1639 the court ordered 100 men raised against Mattabesset, where "severall guilty persons reside and haue beene harbored by Soheage", who had refused to surrender them. The New Haven Colony objected that a new war so soon after the Pequot War would endanger its settlements, and the expedition was dropped.

Sowheag also kept up his ties with the Narragansett. In 1639, when Miantonomi sent gifts of wampum to Governor Winthrop, Winthrop noted that "Sequin, the sachem of Connecticut, sent five fathom" as well, which the historian Thomas Wickman, of Trinity College, takes as a sign that the two leaders were allies and probably kin. According to Ives, Sowheag's "political strength in the Mattabesett area and lack of cooperation with colonial authorities discouraged English settlement there for another decade". In February 1641 the General Court tried to hold him accountable for a mare killed "by his Indeans" (Note: The court record is dated February 8, 1640, in the Old Style calendar, in which the year began on March 25.) and decided to tell New Haven that he was an enemy of the English. In 1641 it banned tree-cutting within three miles of the mouth of the Mattabesset River, which Ives reads as a buffer zone. In August 1642 Native informants reported that Miantonomi was trying to form a confederation with Sowheag and Sequassen to destroy the English settlements. An anonymous "Relation of the Plott" named the three as "Maantanemo the greate Sachem of the Naragancetts, Soheage or Sequin the Sachem of Matebeseck, & Sasawin or Sequassen the Sachem of Sicaogg". No attack took place. That September the Connecticut General Court swore its own members to secrecy while it prepared action against "the Plott of the Indeans meeting about Tunxis". The record leaves the target's name blank; Trumbull, who edited the records in 1850, judged that it "doubtless refers to Sowheag or Sequin".

Before 1650 Sowheag granted "great part of the Township of Midleton" to Governor John Haynes. No deed was written, but the grant is described in the later confirmation by his heirs. In a 2017 history of the Wangunk Reservation, Ives dates Sowheag's permission for English settlement there to 1649, "shortly before his passing". It included a reservation of about 40 acres on the Mattabesset River for a man named Sawsean and his descendants. The English settled Middletown in 1650.

== Death and succession ==
The date of Sowheag's death is not recorded. He had died by 1649, when Governor Peter Stuyvesant of New Netherland, in a report to the States General, referred to him as "the late Sequeen". (Note: Ives (2017) dates Sowheag's permission for the settlement of Middletown to 1649, "shortly before his passing". Wickman suggests an earlier date. In March 1643 Haynes wrote of a disputed "Claime that is made the Mattabeseicke Sachims land", and of a son of Miantonomi who might come to press it; Wickman reads this as a sign that Sowheag had "apparently" died in the previous months.) Ives writes that Sowheag "had long been a chief sachem among the River Indians", and that his career followed a pattern later repeated by his son Sequassen: defeat by a stronger Native power, temporary exile, and a return to part of his former domain.

His successor was his son Turramuggus, whom the historians Katherine Hermes and Alexandra Maravel describe as sachem of Wethersfield and Middletown. Turramuggus died before 1705 and was succeeded by his son Peetoosoh, who was living at Wangunk in 1706.

== Heirs and the Wangunk Reservation ==
Sowheag's heirs confirmed both of his land grants in the 1670s. A deed of December 1671 confirmed his sale of Wethersfield. It was signed by Turramuggus; Sepunnamo, "daughter to Sowheage"; and four others named as his heirs. On January 24, 1672/73, Sepunnamo and other proprietors, "Being priuy to & well acquainted with Sowheag the great Sacham of Mattabesett his gift" to Haynes, confirmed the grant of Middletown. The deed reserved 300 acres on the east side of the river "to be & remayn the heirs of Sowheag & the Mattabeset Indians & their heirs for Euer". On May 28, 1673, the reservation was laid out at Wangunk, in present-day Portland, for thirteen Native proprietors whom Middletown described as "heirs of Sowheag".

The Wangunk held the reservation for about a century. In 1765 the Connecticut General Assembly ordered the remaining 200 or so acres sold. The petition stated that most of the roughly forty surviving members had dispersed to the Mohegan, to Farmington, Hartford and New Hartford, and that only a few people remained on the land, among them Mary, the elderly widow of the "late sachem" Cushoy.

== Family ==
Sowheag's children included Sequassen, Wawarme, Sepunnamo, Towkishke, Seacutt, Turramuggus and Wesumpsha. Hermes describes Sequassen as apparently the eldest son, who often negotiated with the English and the Dutch, and Wawarme as the eldest daughter. Hermes and Maravel write that Wawarme was one of Sowheag's three daughters and Sepunnamo another, and that Wawarme married Miantonomi and was the mother of Maussecup. They treat Wawarme and Wawaloam, the name records generally give Miantonomi's wife, as the same woman, although scholars differ on this. (Note: The identification goes back to Maussecup. The historian William DeLoss Love, noting that Maussecup was Miantonomi's son and the first signer of Hartford's 1670 deed, thought it probable that Miantonomi had made a marriage alliance with Sequassen's family, and suggested that Wawarme was Maussecup's mother. The historian Howard M. Chapin, writing in 1931 on the Narragansett sachems, found no evidence for a link between Wawaloam and Sequassen's family beyond Miantonomi's regard for Sequassen as a relative; he noted that Wawaloam called the Niantic sachem Ninigret her uncle, and reasoned from a 1637 letter of Roger Williams that Miantonomi's wife at that time was a sister of the Niantic sachem Wepitamock.) Ives, citing the 1933 account of Mathias Spiess, writes that Wawarme ruled the community at Suckiaug as sunksquaw (a female sachem) alongside Sequassen, and Hermes and Maravel describe Towkishke as a sunksquaw of Thirty Mile Island (now Haddam Island) and the Haddam area, a title later held by her daughter Pampenum. Wickman writes that after Miantonomi's execution in 1643, Wangunk women including Wawarme, Sepunnamo and Towkishke "were among the community leaders who carried forward claims to sovereignty" along the river.

The sachem Montowese, who sold land north of New Haven to the New Haven settlers in 1638, is often described as Sowheag's son, although the 1638 agreement calls him "a nephew to Sequin".

Altarbaenhoot (grand sachem, d. c. 1634)
Sowheag (grand sachem, d. before 1650)
Miantonomi	Wawarme (sunksquaw at Suckiaug)	Sequassen (sachem of Suckiaug)	Sepunnamo	Towkishke (sunksquaw at Haddam)	Seacutt	Turramuggus (grand sachem)	Wesumpsha
Maussecup	Peetoosoh (sachem)

Sowheag's family. The dashed line marks a marriage. The birth order of Sowheag's children is not known. (Note: Sowheag's descent from Altarbaenhoot follows Hermes. The list of his children follows the Native Northeast Portal, Spiess and Hermes; Montowese is left out because the 1638 deed calls him Sequin's nephew. The marriage of Wawarme and Miantonomi follows Hermes and Maravel; some scholars doubt it. Maussecup and Peetoosoh follow Hermes and Maravel and Stiles. Titles follow Ives for Wawarme, Trumbull for Turramuggus, and Hermes and Maravel for Towkishke and Peetoosoh. These sources do not say whether Wesumpsha was a son or a daughter.)

== Later research ==
Hermes writes that the Wangunk "remain largely erased from Connecticut history". She notes that with no Wangunk tribal nation surviving as an organized entity, there is no central repository for their records, and that historians did not trace Wangunk genealogy as they did for the Mohegan or Narragansett, so that members of Sowheag's family "appeared in history books almost as if out of nowhere". Hermes and Maravel have traced Sowheag's descendants through colonial deeds, wills and court records into the eighteenth century.

== Works cited ==
- Chapin, Howard M. (1931). Sachems of the Narragansetts. Providence: Rhode Island Historical Society.
- De Forest, John W. (1851). History of the Indians of Connecticut from the Earliest Known Period to 1850. Hartford: Wm. Jas. Hamersley.
- Hermes, Katherine; Maravel, Alexandra (2017). "Finding the Onepennys Among the Wongunk". Bulletin of the Archaeological Society of Connecticut (79): 95–109.
- Hermes, Katherine (March 25, 2019). "Repairing Hartford's indigenous past". History@Work. National Council on Public History.
- Ives, Timothy Howlett (2001). Wangunk Ethnohistory: A Case Study of a Connecticut River Indian Community (M.A. thesis). College of William & Mary. doi:10.21220/s2-xcrv-vp43.
- Ives, Timothy H. (2017). "A Brief History of the Wangunk Reservation". Bulletin of the Archaeological Society of Connecticut (79): 49–56.
- Lavin, Lucianne (2017). "Pre-Colonial History of the Wangunk". Bulletin of the Archaeological Society of Connecticut (79): 41–48.
- Love, William DeLoss (1914). The Colonial History of Hartford, Gathered from the Original Records. Hartford: Published by the author.
- "Sowheage, - 1649". Native Northeast Portal.
- Trumbull, J. Hammond, ed. (1850). The Public Records of the Colony of Connecticut, Prior to the Union with New Haven Colony, May, 1665. Hartford: Brown & Parsons.
- Spiess, Mathias (1933). The Indians of Connecticut. Tercentenary Commission of the State of Connecticut, Committee on Historical Publications. New Haven: Yale University Press.
- Stiles, Henry R. (1904). The History of Ancient Wethersfield, Connecticut. Vol. 1. New York: Grafton Press.
- Trumbull, J. Hammond (1886). "The Indians of Hartford County". In Trumbull, J. Hammond (ed.). The Memorial History of Hartford County, Connecticut, 1633–1884 (PDF). Vol. 1. Boston: Edward L. Osgood.
- Wickman, Thomas (Spring 2021). "Our Best Places: Gender, Food Sovereignty, and Miantonomi's Kin on the Connecticut River". Early American Studies. 19 (2): 215–263. JSTOR 27077831.
