= Saukiog =

17th-century Wangunk village at Hartford, Connecticut

Saukiog Suckiaug, Suckiog, Sicaog
- Former Wangunk village
- Approximate location in Connecticut
- Coordinates: 41.76°N 72.68°W (Note: Approximate; the exact site of the village is not recorded.)
- Present-day location: Hartford, Connecticut
- First recorded: 1633
- Land confirmed to Hartford: 1670
- Community moved to Farmington: After 1725

Government
  - Type: Sachemship
  - Sachem: Sequassen (fl. 1633 – c. 1657)
  - Sunksquaw: Wawarme (his sister)

Population
  - Estimate (1725): 40
- Approximate count by Governor Joseph Talcott

Saukiog (also Suckiaug, Suckiog or Sicaog) was a Wangunk village on the Connecticut River at what is now Hartford, Connecticut. The Dutch built a trading post there in 1633, and in 1636 the English settlers who founded Hartford obtained its land from the village's sachem, Sequassen. Members of the community remained on reserved land in Hartford's South Meadow into the eighteenth century, and later joined the Tunxis at Farmington.

== Name ==
The name has been spelled Saukiog, Suckiaug, Suckiog, Suckiage, Sicaog, Sickaog, Siacaog and Suckiauk. The 1633 Dutch deed for the site calls it "Sicajoock". The historian William DeLoss Love derived the name from "sucki-auke", meaning "black earth", and it has also been translated as "black soil" or "dark earth". Trinity College's land acknowledgment glosses it as "black fertile earth".

== People and political setting ==
According to the archaeologist Lucianne Lavin of the Institute for American Indian Studies, Saukiog was one of more than a dozen Wangunk villages along both banks of the Connecticut River, from present-day Windsor Locks to East Haddam. The Smithsonian ethnologist John R. Swanton classes the river peoples as speakers of an Algonquian language. Lavin writes that early Dutch and English records show the villages united in the 1630s under a grand sachem, Sowheag, whose sons, daughters and other kin were sachems of individual villages. Sowheag's son Sequassen was sachem of Saukiog, and the anthropologist Timothy Ives, citing the 1933 account of Mathias Spiess, writes that Sequassen's sister Wawarme ruled the community alongside him as sunksquaw (a female sachem).

Some older works treated Saukiog as a tribe of its own. Swanton (1952) listed "Sicaog" as a sachemship separate from the Wangunk, within a larger Wappinger grouping. More recent scholarship treats Saukiog as a Wangunk village.

== History ==
Places in the history of Saukiog
| 1 | Little Meadow (Love's probable site of the village in 1636) |
| 2 | House of Hope (Dutch trading post, 1633) |
| 3 | Indian Lot (northern tract of the Indian land, near the later Colt's Ferry; in Native hands until 1723) |
| 4 | South Meadow Indian land (reserved for the Native community; scene of Uncas's attack in 1643) |
| 5 | Nawaas fort (fortified village reported by Block in 1614, placed by Trumbull in South Windsor) |

All locations are approximate and follow the written descriptions in the sources. Red marks Native sites at Saukiog.

The Dutch navigator Adriaen Block sailed up the Connecticut River in 1614. His report describes the "Sequins" living near the river's great bend and, farther upstream at latitude 41°48′, a fortified village of the "Nawaas", which the nineteenth-century historian and philologist J. Hammond Trumbull placed in present-day South Windsor, across the river and upstream from Saukiog. Before 1633 the Pequot claimed the central Connecticut River valley by conquest. In 1633 the Pequot sachem Wapyquart (Tatobem) sold the Dutch land at Saukiog, where they built the trading post later known as the House of Hope. A smallpox epidemic in 1633–1634 killed a large part of the region's Native population.

In 1636 Sequassen granted the land of Saukiog to Samuel Stone and William Goodwin for the English settlers who founded Hartford. The grant ran from the Wethersfield line north to Windsor and "full six miles" west of the river. The original deed is lost; its terms survive in a confirmation of 1670. The Native community kept land in the South Meadow, near the Dutch post. Love placed the village itself in the Little Meadow beside the North Meadow Creek, north of the English settlement, where the pioneers found the Native people living in 1636. The 1638 Treaty of Hartford, which ended the Pequot War, was negotiated at Hartford on the land of Saukiog, where the historian Thomas Wickman, of Trinity College, writes that the Narragansett sachem Miantonomi had close allies and kin.

In 1643 the Mohegan sachem Uncas attacked Sequassen at Saukiog, killing seven or eight of his men and burning wigwams. Love places the fighting in the South Meadow, in the early summer of that year. Sequassen went into exile and returned in 1650. In January 1644, while Sequassen was in exile, a Hartford town meeting ordered an inquiry into whether the land "yt ded belong to the indians aptayning to Soaquasen", and land that had belonged to someone named Manorolos, now belonged to the town. (Note: The name Manorolos appears nowhere else in the records. Love read the order as referring to two tracts of Indian land in the South Meadow, one belonging to Sequassen and the other to Manorolos, whom he identified as "a Sequin chief who had lived near the Dutch". Wickman notes that the record does not say whether Manorolos was a man or a woman.)

In 1663 the town of Hartford reserved land in the South Meadow for the Native community. On July 5, 1670, eight Native signers confirmed the 1636 grant to the town's proprietors. Two of them, Maussecup and William squa, signed also for Sequassen's sister Wawarme as his "onely heire"; Maussecup was her son by Miantonomi. The deed describes the signers and Wawarme as "the onely inhabitants that are surviving" of the land. The northern part of the Indian land, near the river at the site later known as Colt's Ferry, remained in Native hands until 1723. In 1713 Sarah Onepenny left her land in the South Meadow to her grandson Scipio, a servant of Colonel William Whiting, and in 1723 Scipio, called Scipio Two Shoes, sold the lot "whereon ye Wigwams are now Standing" to Whiting. In 1725 Governor Joseph Talcott counted about forty Native people living in the meadow south of the town; the remaining members of the community later moved to Farmington and joined the Tunxis.

== Remembrance ==
Several streets in Hartford's South Meadow, near Colt Park, are named for Native people connected with Saukiog, including Sequassen Street, Wawarme Avenue and Masseek Street, the last named for Maussecup, a signer of the 1670 deed. The historian Katherine Hermes writes that the Wangunk "remain largely erased from Connecticut history", although they were "the people who allowed the English to settle in Hartford, which they called Suckiog".

The name is used by present-day groups in the city. Since 2019 local Indigenous community members, working with Ebony Horsewomen, the Hartford Public Library and other organizations, have held a Saukiog Harvest Festival in Hartford, which the organizers describe as a celebration of Indigenous presence rather than a traditional powwow. A 2026 land acknowledgment poster at Trinity College describes the campus as lying in "a Wangunk territory called 'Suckiaug.'"
