= Park River (Connecticut) =

River in the U.S. state of Connecticut

Coordinates: 41°45′36.1″N 72°39′52.7″W

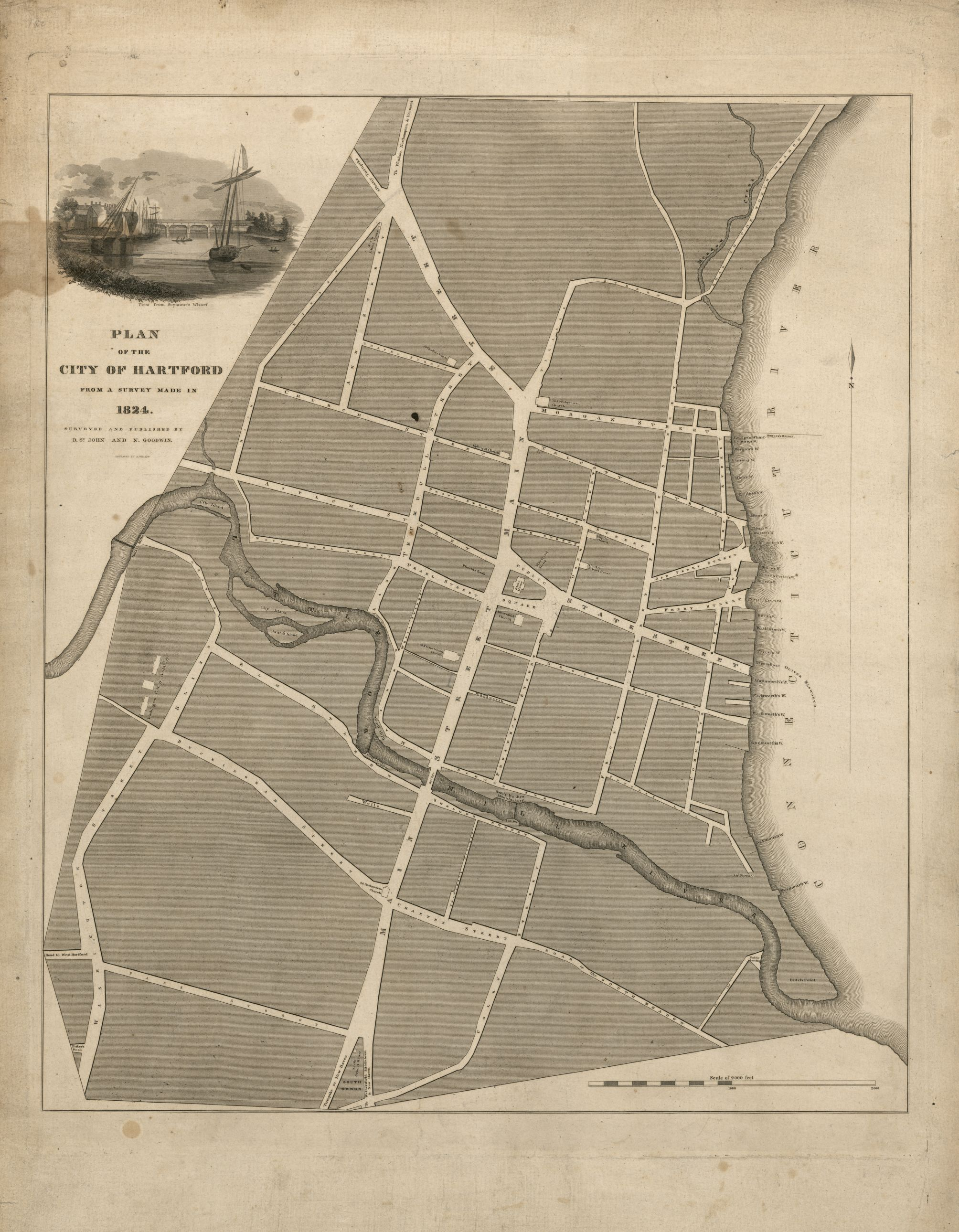
The original course of the Park River is visible in this 1824 survey map of Hartford

The Park River is a tributary of the Connecticut River in Hartford, Connecticut. It was officially named the Park River in 1892 after Bushnell Park, through which it flowed in downtown Hartford. A local newspaper had advocated for that name rather than the “’Hog River’” name which was then in use. Between 1940 and the 1980s, the 2.3-mile (3.7 km) river was buried by the Army Corps of Engineers to prevent the spring floods regularly caused by increased surface runoff from urban development.

== History ==
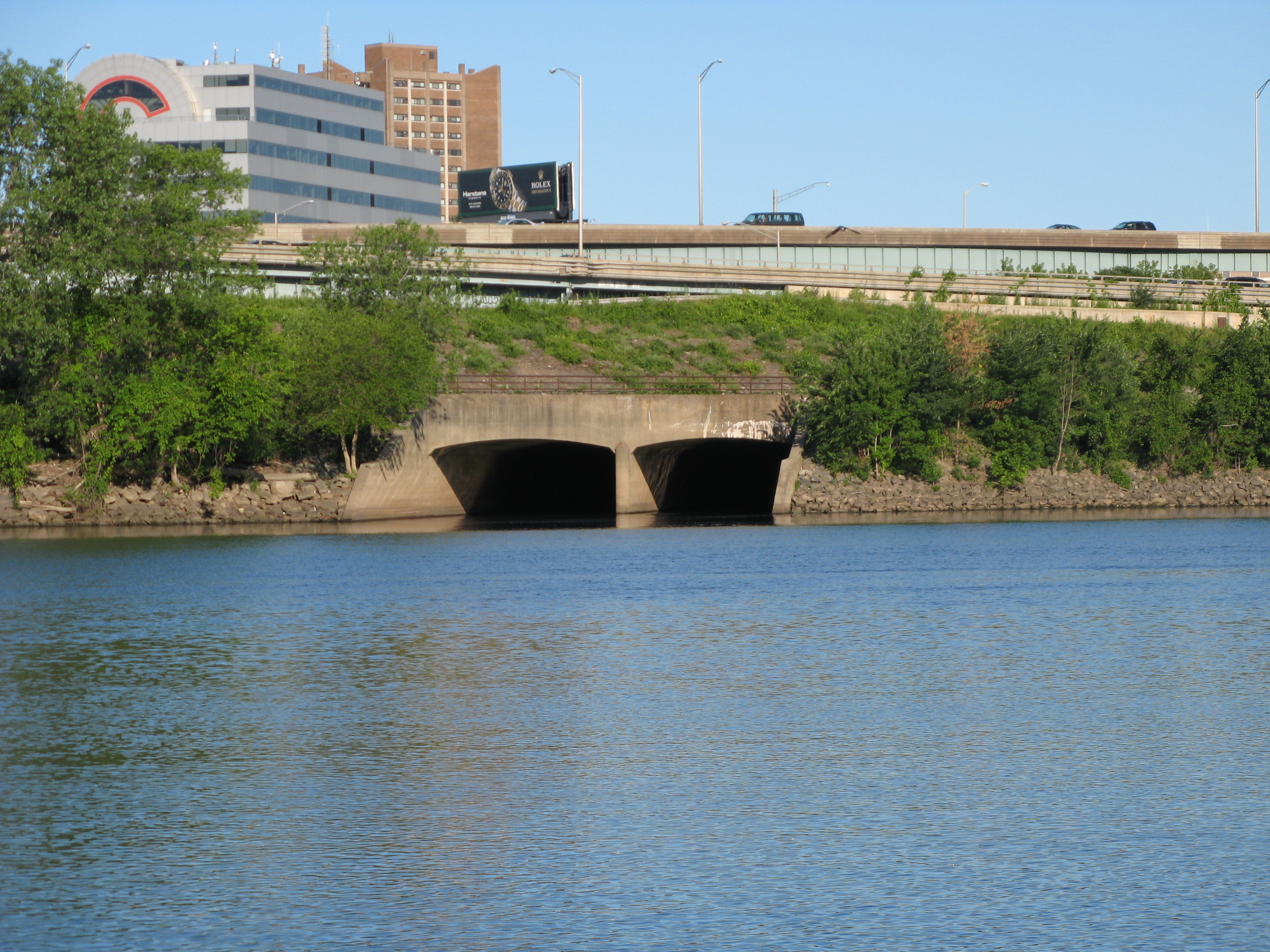
The confluence of the Park River and the Connecticut River

Before European settlement, several indigenous Algonquian peoples, including the Wangunk or Wongunk, Saukiog or Suckiaug, Podunk, and Tunxis peoples lived on the fertile banks of the Connecticut and Park rivers. In 1633, fur traders from the Dutch West India Company set up Fort Goede Hoop at the Park and Connecticut rivers' confluence. The Dutch referred to the Connecticut River as the "Great River", and called its tributary, the Park, the "Little River".

The first English settlers arrived in the area in 1635; the following year, the Reverend Thomas Hooker led 100 of his congregation to form a new settlement north of the Dutch fort. The first mill in the settlement was built on the Little River by Matthew Allyn to grind local corn. During industrialization, the Little River became known as Mill River because of the numerous mills built to use its water power.

The lower part of the river was prone to flooding. Damaging floods in 1936 and 1938 led to a public works project to move the lower part underground, which was started by the US Army Corps of Engineers in 1940. The conduit under Bushnell Park (for which the river was named) was completed in 1943–1949. Sections farther upriver were completed after the next big floods in August 1955, which followed two hurricanes (Connie and Diane) that came about a week apart, and the whole project was completed in the 1980s, with a total of more than 9 miles of river underground.

== North Branch Park River watershed ==
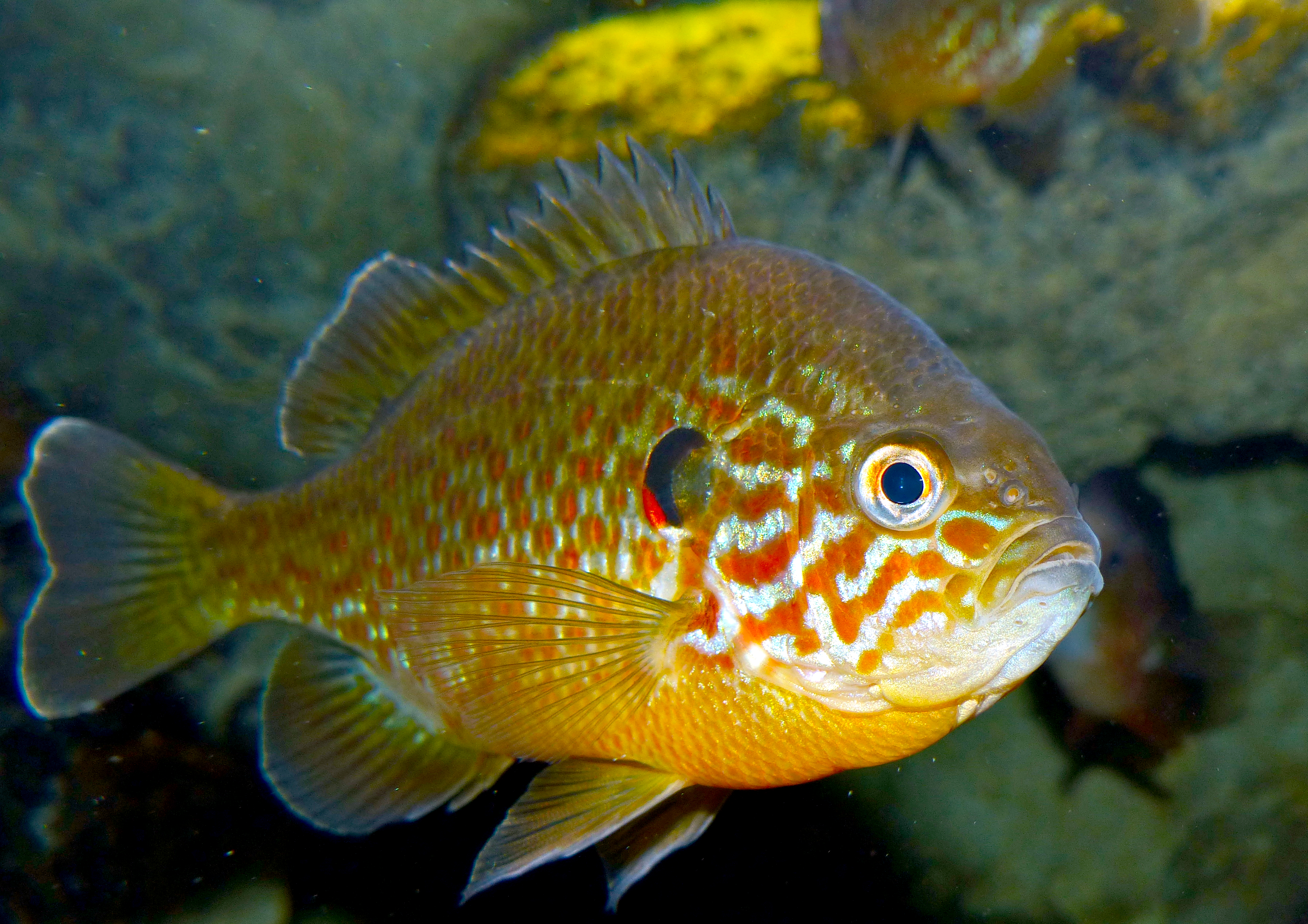
Pumpkinseed (Lepomis gibbosus)

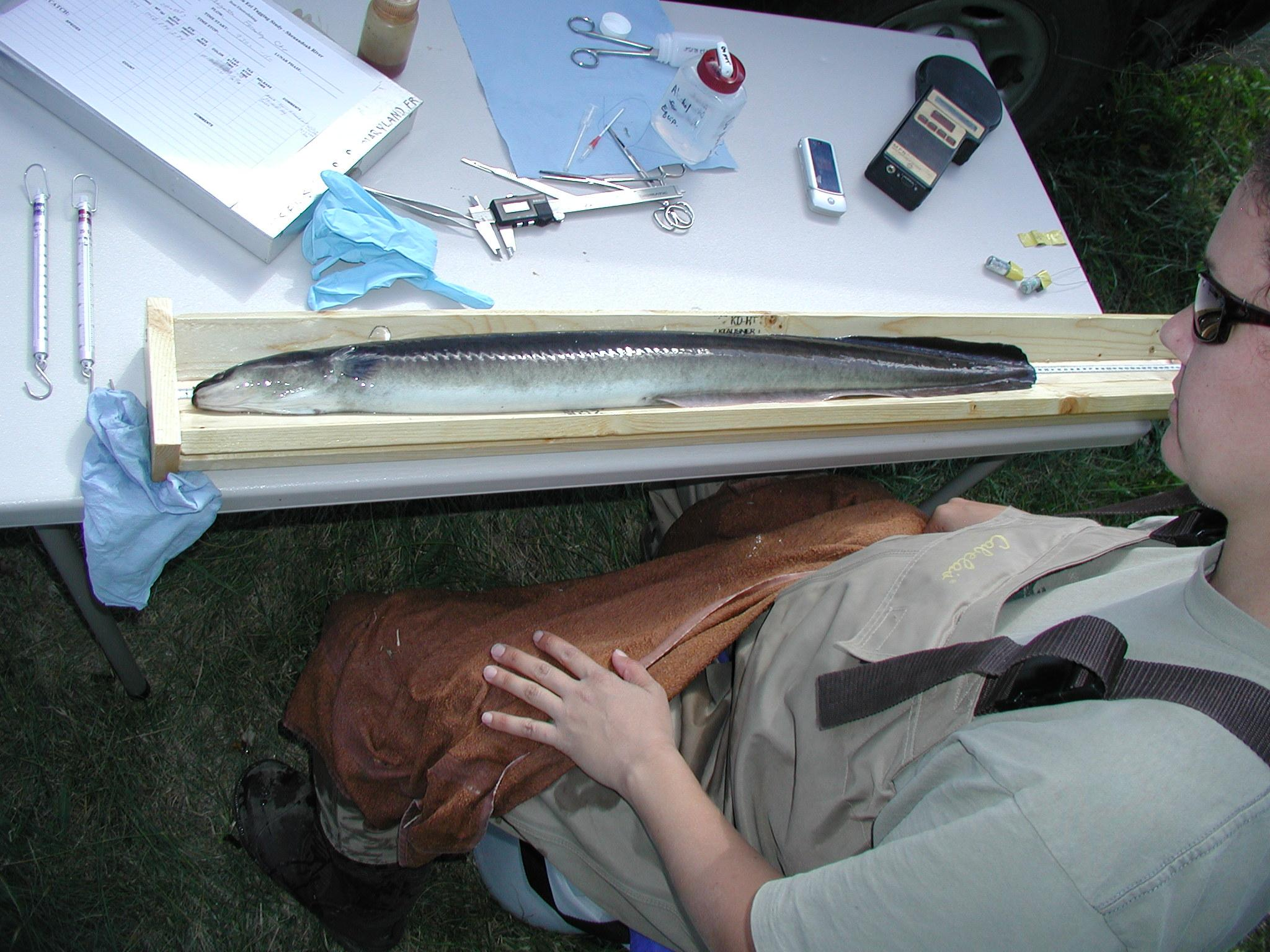
American eel

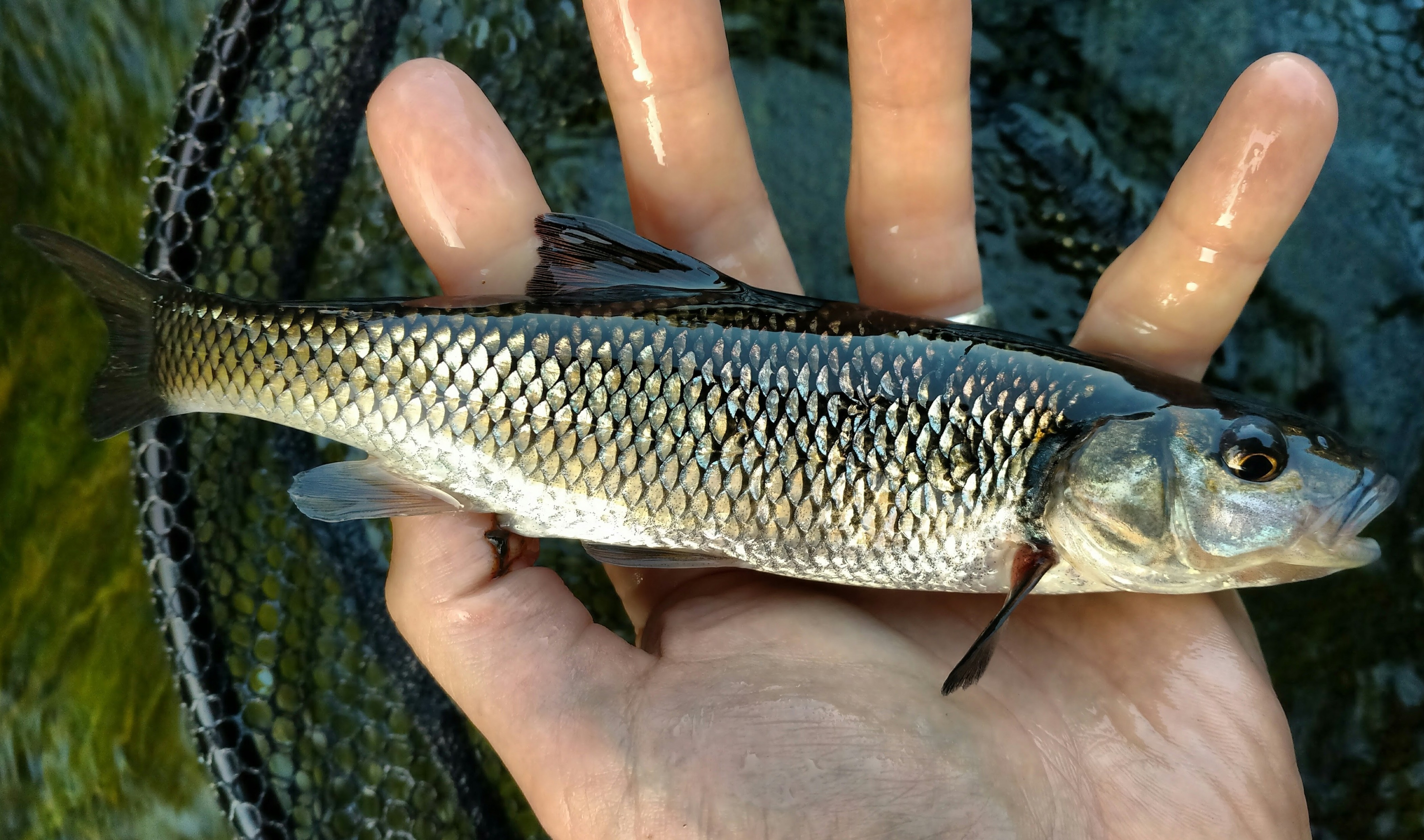
Fallfish

The North Branch Park River watershed is a 28.6 square-mile basin within the larger (78 square-mile) Park River watershed. It has a watershed management plan that was completed in 2010. and its subwatersheds are mapped here.

Four major tributaries in the upper watershed—Beamans Brook, Wash Brook, Filley Brook, and Tumbledown Brook (Tumble Brook)--drain Bloomfield (68% of the watershed) and northern parts of West Hartford (17% of the watershed), converging near the University of Hartford to form the North Branch of the Park River. The North Branch then flows between the West End, Blue Hills, and Asylum Hill neighborhoods of Hartford (11% of its watershed) before pouring into an underground conduit just north of Farmington Avenue. The North Branch then flows approximately 0.5 miles in an underground conduit before joining the South Branch Park River in Pope Park, and ultimately flowing to the Connecticut River via the 2.3-mile (3.7 km) Park River conduit.

The North Branch watershed includes Nook Farm, named for the bend or nook in the river just south of Nook Farm. Nook Farm became an artists’ colony that included the authors Harriet Beecher Stowe and Mark Twain. Twain and his wife Livy built an elaborate home overlooking the North Branch floodplain, where he enjoyed seeing its marshes and wildlife from his house. The “nook” portion of the North Branch was visible from the west-facing side of the house, as seen in a photo of it taken from the library window.

The nook was filled in before 1934 to allow construction of a row of apartments on Farmington Avenue, and a new straight channel for the North Branch was dug to the west of it. That channel was buried after 1965 to create land for athletic fields for the nearby Hartford Public High School, and for a parking lot for the Twain House.

The watershed features a number of native and introduced fish, many of which are game fish. A 2000 survey found American Eel, Pumpkinseed, and Tessellated darter to be the most abundant species in the North Branch. A 2008 survey found that North Branch tributary creeks hold large populations of Eastern blacknose dace and Longnose dace. Largemouth Bass, Fallfish, Common shiner, Common carp, Bluegill, Redbreast sunfish, Rock Bass, White sucker, and Banded killifish are also found throughout the North Branch and its tributaries.

== South Branch Park River watershed ==
The South Branch Park River watershed covers 39.6 square miles, and the river is formed by the confluence of Trout Brook and Piper Brook, near New Britain Avenue in the Elmwood section of West Hartford. The South Branch is exposed from there to Pope Park, where it joins the North Branch and flows from there to the Connecticut River in a conduit.

There was extensive flooding in Elmwood near the upper end of the South Branch after the two hurricanes in August 1955, and a large flood control project was started to reduce the risk of future flooding. This project was completed in 1993, and major maintenance of the structures was done in 2015–16. The South Branch is classified as impaired for recreation due to elevated bacteria levels, although it has no recreational facilities.

The Trout Brook watershed covers 17.7 square miles, and, 66% of West Hartford is in the Trout Brook watershed. Sections of Trout Brook are impaired, and there was controversy in 2014 about cutting down forest near the brook to build more homes. Piper Brook starts in St. Mary's Cemetery in New Britain, has an 11.5 square mile watershed, and also has impaired sections. Bass Brook is the other brook in the watershed, with a 10.4 square mile watershed, which starts near the intersection of Corbin & Farmington avenues and flows into Piper Brook near CT Route 9 in New Britain. Other towns in the South Branch watershed are Newington, Farmington and Wethersfield.

== See also ==
The name Hog River derives from the pig farms along what was originally called the “Little River”.

- List of rivers of Connecticut
