= Wampano =

Wampano may refer to:

- Quiripi language or Wampano, an Algonquian language formerly spoken by the indigenous people of southwestern Connecticut and central Long Island
- Wampano, the sub-tribal Renapi/Lenape Dawnland Confederacy of the Quinnipiac nation of the Algonquian family in present-day Connecticut
