= Podunk people =

Extinct Native American tribe from Connecticut

Podunk
Total population
- extinct as a tribe, primarily merged with Pequot in late 17th century

Regions with significant populations
- Hartford County, Connecticut, U.S.

Languages
- an Algonquian language

Religion
- Indigenous religion

Related ethnic groups
- Pequot, Tunxis

The Podunk were a Native American people who spoke an Algonquian Quiripi language and lived primarily in what is now known as Hartford County, Connecticut, United States. English colonists adopted use of a Nipmuc dialect word for the territory of this people.

The Podunk are likely the Hoccanum people.

== Name ==
Podunk is of Algonquian origin, meaning 'where you sink in mire', or a boggy place, in the Nipmuc dialect. The Podunk people called their homeplace Nowashe, meaning 'between rivers'.

== Territory ==
This tribe lived in territory near the mouth of the Park River at its confluence with the Connecticut River. The Dutch called these waterways the Little River and Great River, respectively. The Dutch indicated their territory on an early 17th-century map with the term Nowass, likely a transliteration of the Algonquian word.

The former Podunk land is included in the towns of East Hartford, East Windsor, South Windsor, Manchester, part of Ellington, Vernon, Bolton, Marlborough and Glastonbury. According to a late 19th-century history, the region north of the Hockanum River was generally known as Podunk in colonial times; that south of the river, as Hockanum; however, these are likely the same people.

== Culture ==
Like other Indigenous peoples of the Northeastern Woodlands, the Podunk built their summer lodges near the river. They fished for shad and salmon, and lampreys in their season. The men hunted deer and bear, as well as small game. The women cultivated and processed varieties of maize and beans, as well as drying the meats and preparing skins. They used the furs of otter, mink, and beaver for clothing, and used other hides to cover their wigwams. In winter they moved to inland campsites. In the winter, they ate dried venison and bear meat. Their tools, artifacts, and other archeological evidence have been found along the rivers and in the highlands.

== 17th-century history ==
English colonists entered the Connecticut River valley around 1631. They called the local people the River Tribes. After the English began to settle in this area, the General Court reserved much of the land to the Podunk as their traditional territory. In the Winter of 1635, the Podunk kept alive the ill-prepared settlers at Hartford with their gifts of "malt, and acorns, and grains." During this time, the Podunk were governed by two sachems, Waginacut and Arramamet.

Before the English-Narragansett war, the Podunk seemed to have had a peaceful relationship with colonists. Until about 1675 they lived nearby. However, the English restricted the Podunk in many ways. Smiths were not to work for the Podunk, and none but licensed traders were to buy their corn, beaver, venison, or timber. The English forbade any trade in arms, horses, dogs, or boats, or in "dangerous" supplies, such as cider or alcohol.

The Podunk were forbidden to enter English houses or handle the weapons of the settlers, nor were they to bring their own guns into the towns. If found in the English colony at night, they were at risk of arrest by a guard, or of being shot if they had a conflict. The Podunk were not allowed to harbor outsiders in their villages. In 1653 the English ordered them to give up their arms to prove their loyalty.

In 1657, a dispute between the Podunks and both the Mohegans and Tunxis surrounding the murder of a "Connecticut sagamore," seems to have led to the outbreak of a war against Uncas, sachem of the Mohegans, where the Podunks were aided by the Pocomtuc.

In 1659, Thomas Burnham (1617–1688) purchased the tract of land now covered by the towns of South Windsor and East Hartford from Tantinomo. "Fort Hill" is probably the fort to which "one-eyed" Tantinomo withdrew at the time of his quarrel with chiefs Uncas and Sequassen in 1665, when the English unsuccessfully attempted arbitration between them.

The Podunks briefly fought in the 1675–76 King Philip's War, in which most of their fighting men died. After Metacomet (Wampanoag), also known as King Philip, was killed, the surviving Podunk dispersed. Most merged into the Pequot, while others joined the Poquonoc, Suckiag, and Tunxis. English colonists claimed their former lands.
