= Sisson-South Whitney Historic District =

- Sisson-South Whitney District
- U.S. National Register of Historic Places
- U.S. Historic district
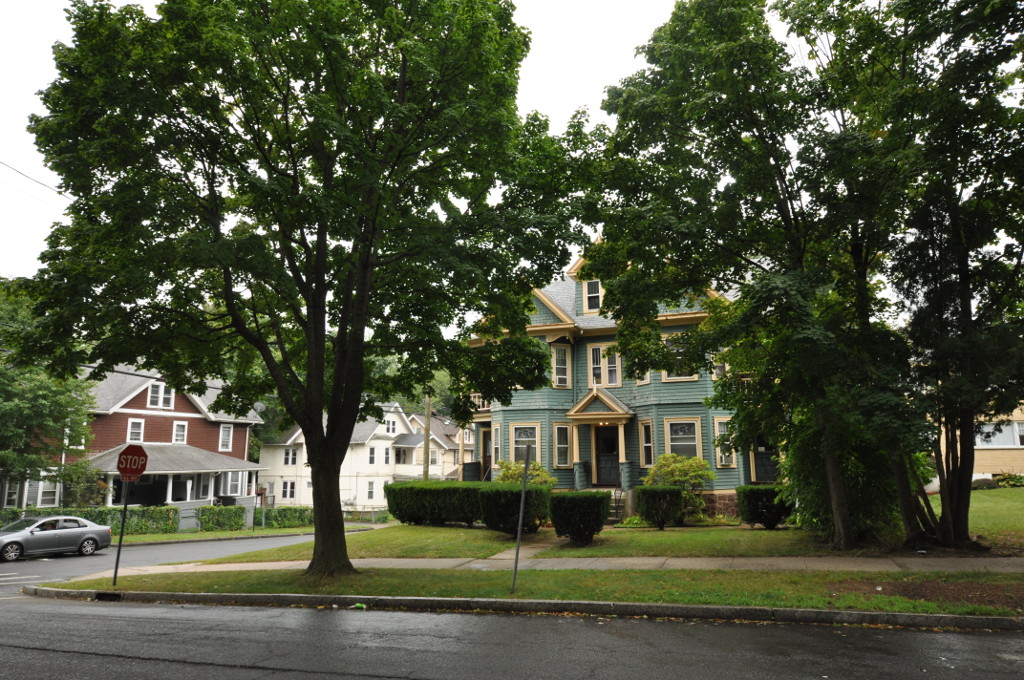

- Location within Connecticut Location within the United States
- Location: Roughly bounded by West Boulevard, South Whitney Street, Farmington & Sisson Avenues, Hartford, Connecticut
- Coordinates: 41°45′51″N 72°42′32″W
- Built: 1865
- NRHP reference No.: 13000526
- Added to NRHP: July 24, 2013

The Sisson-South Whitney Historic District encompasses a neighborhood in the West End area of Hartford, Connecticut, that was built out between 1890 and 1930 as a streetcar suburb. It is roughly bounded by Farmington Avenue, South Whitney Street, West Boulevard, and Sisson Avenue, and includes a diversity of residential and commercial architecture, reflective of its initial development and subsequent growth. The district was listed on the National Register of Historic Places in 2013.

== Description and history ==
Hartford's West End, roughly from the Park River to the western city line, was primarily farmland until about 1870. By the early 1890s, the city's streetcar network had extended into the area, and the farmland was purchased by developers, platted, subdivided, and developed. Farmington Avenue developed as a commercial service area for the neighborhood, with residential areas to the north and south. South Whitney Street was laid out in 1897, and Sisson Avenue in 1900. Nearly 1/3 of the district's buildings were erected between 1890 and 1909, and development continued at a similar pace for the next two decades.

The historic district extends along Farmington Avenue between South Whitney and Sisson Avenue, with only a few buildings on streets just north of Farmington. It extends along South Whitney, Sisson Avenue, and Evergreen Avenue, all the way to West Boulevard, and along the latter two nearly to Capitol Avenue. Most of its buildings are residential two-story structures, of which the majority are wood frame construction. Stylistically they are diverse, using the architectural vocabulary of revival styles popular at the time. Residences are typically set on small lots with uniform setbacks and scale, giving those areas a unified streetscape.

== See also ==
- National Register of Historic Places listings in Hartford, Connecticut
