= Quiripi language =

Language

Quiripi
- Native to: United States
- Region: Gold Coast, Long Island
- Ethnicity: Quinnipiac, Unquachog, Mattabessett (Wangunk), Podunk, Tunxis, Paugussett
- Extinct: ca. 1900
- Language family: Algic: Algonquian; Eastern Algonquian; Quiripi

Language codes
- ISO 639-3: qyp
- Glottolog: wamp1250
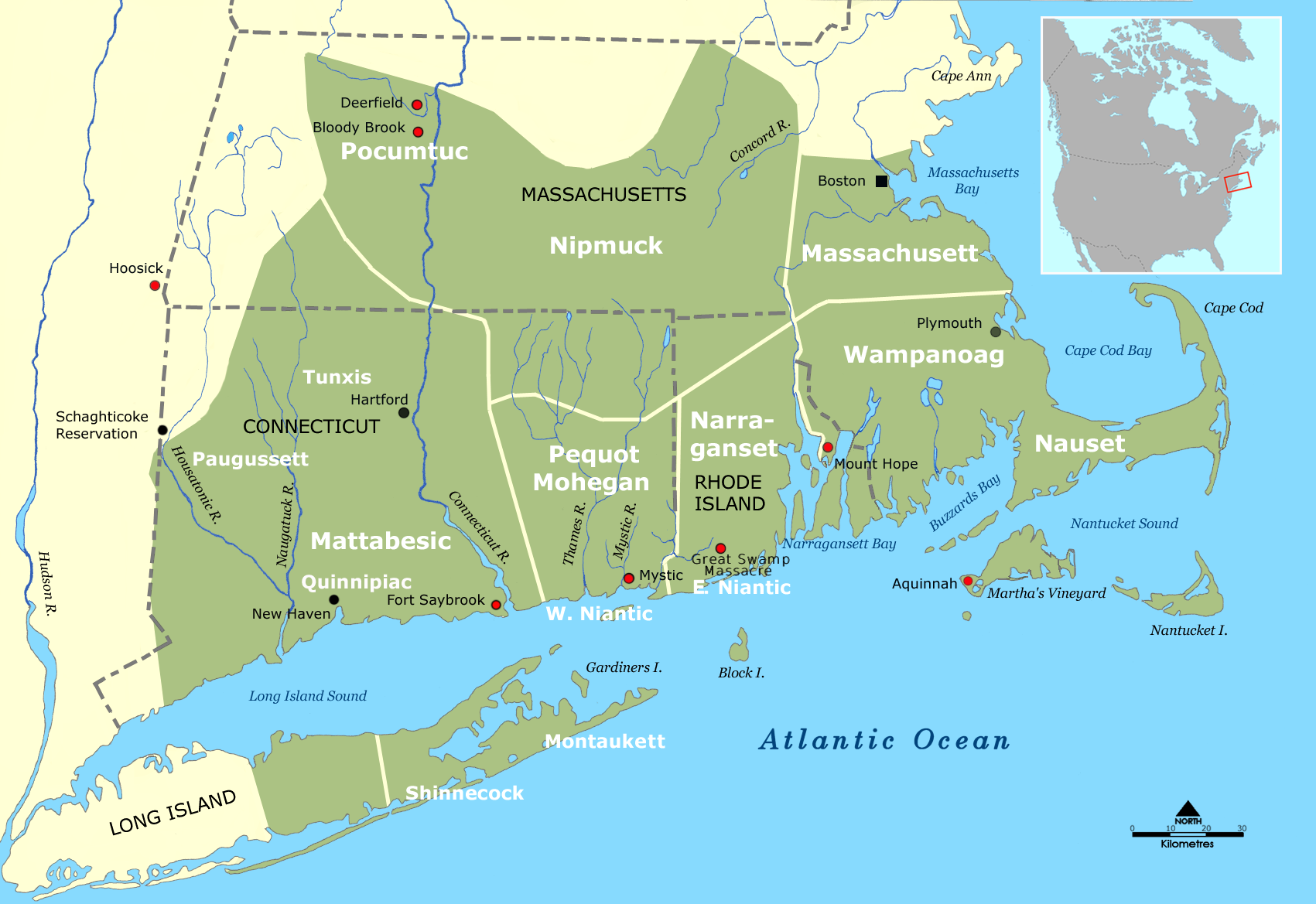
- The location of the Paugussett, Tunxis, Podunk, Quinnipiac, Mattabesic (Wangunk), Unquachog and their neighbors, c. 1600

Quiripi (pronounced /ˈkwɪrɪpiː/KWIH-rih-pee) is an extinct Algonquian language formerly spoken by the Quinnipiac, an Indigenous nation of southwestern Connecticut and central Long Island, It has been extinct since the end of the 19th century, although Frank Siebert was able to record a few Unquachog words from an elderly woman in 1932.

== Name ==
Quiripi has also been called also known as Mattabesic, Quiripi-Unquachog, Quiripi-Naugatuck, and Wampano.

== Affiliation and dialects ==
Quiripi is an Eastern Algonquian language of the Algonquian language family. It shared several linguistic features with the other Algonquian languages of southern New England, such as Massachusett and Mohegan-Pequot, including the shifting of Proto-Eastern Algonquian */aː/ and */eː/ to /ãː/ and /aː/, respectively, and the palatalization of earlier */k/ before certain front vowels. There appear to have been two major dialects of Quiripi: an "insular" dialect spoken on Long Island by the Unquachog and a "mainland" dialect spoken by the other groups in Connecticut, principally the Quinnipiac.

== Attestation ==
Quiripi is very poorly attested, though some sources do exist. One of the earliest Quiripi vocabularies was a 67-page bilingual catechism compiled in 1658 by Abraham Pierson, the elder, during his ministry at Branford, Connecticut, which remains the chief source of modern conclusions about Quiripi. Unfortunately, the catechism was "poorly translated" by Pierson, containing an "unidiomatic, non-Algonquian sentence structure." It also displays signs of dialect mixture. Other sources of information on the language include a vocabulary collected by the Rev. Ezra Stiles in the late 1700s and a 202-word Unquachog vocabulary recorded by Thomas Jefferson in 1791, though the Jefferson vocabulary also shows clear signs of dialect mixture and "external influences." Additionally, three early hymns written circa 1740 at the Moravian Shekomeko mission near Kent, Connecticut, have been translated by Carl Masthay.

== Phonology ==
Linguist Blair Rudes attempted to reconstitute the phonology of Quiripi, using the extant documentation, comparison with related Algonquian languages, as "reconstructing forward" from Proto-Algonquian. In Rudes' analysis, Quiripi contains the following consonant phonemes:

	Labial	Alveolar	Palatal	Velar	Glottal
Plosive	p	t	tʃ	k	
Fricative		s	(ʃ)^{*}		h
Nasal	m	n			
Rhotic		r			
Semivowel	w		j		

/ʃ/ was a distinct phoneme only in the mainland dialect; in Unquachog it had merged with /s/

Quiripi's vowel system as reconstituted by Rudes is similar to that of the other Southern New England Algonquian languages. It consists of two short vowels /a/ and /ə/, and four long vowels /aː/, /iː/, /uː/, and /ʌ̃/.

== Bibliography ==
- Costa, David J. (2007). "The Dialectology of Southern New England Algonquian." In Papers of the 38th Algonquian Conference, ed. H. C. Wolfart. Winnipeg: University of Manitoba, pp. 81–127
- Goddard, Ives (1978). "Eastern Algonquian Languages." In Northeast, ed. Bruce G. Trigger. Vol. 15 of Handbook of North American Indians, ed. William C. Sturtevant. Washington, D.C.: Smithsonian Institution, pp. 70–77
- Mithun, Marianne (1999). The Languages of Native North America. Cambridge: Cambridge University Press
- "Quiripi (Quinnipiac, Unquachog, Wampano, Naugatuck, Mattabesic)." Native American Language Net
- Pierson, Rev. Abraham (1980). Some Helps for the Indians 1658 Bilingual Catechism, reprinted in "Language and Lore of the Long Island Indians," Readings in Long Island Archaeology and Ethnohistory, Vol. IV. Stony Brook, NY: Suffolk County Archaeological Association
- Rudes, Blair A. (1997). "Resurrecting Wampano (Quiripi) from the Dead: Phonological Preliminaries." Anthropological Linguistics (39)1:1–59
- Salwen, Bert (1978). "Indians of Southern New England and Long Island: Early Period." In Northeast, ed. Bruce G. Trigger. Vol. 15 of Handbook of North American Indians, ed. William C. Sturtevant. Washington, D.C.: Smithsonian Institution, pp. 160–176
