= Massaco =

Indigenous settlement in Connecticut, US

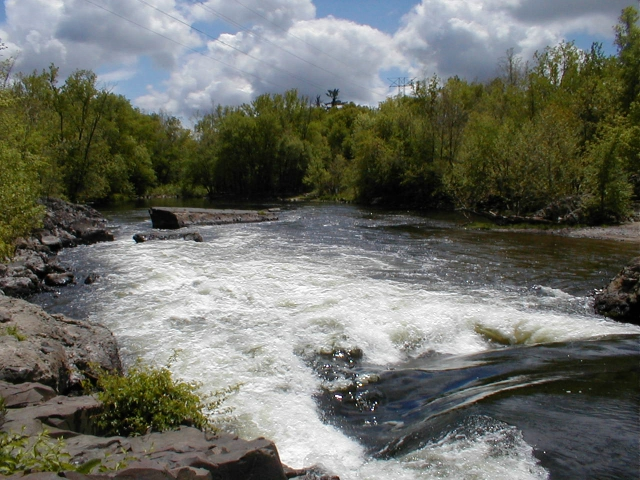
The Farmington River, that ran through the Massaco territory, was once called the Tunxis River

Massaco was a native settlement in Connecticut, United States, near the present-day towns of Simsbury and Canton along the banks of the Farmington River. The small, local Algonquian-speaking Indians who lived there in the 17th and early 18th centuries belonged to the Tunxis, a Wappinger people.

The Massaco were first encountered by Dutch settlers at the beginning of the 17th century, who referred to the river where they dwelt as the Massaco. Over time, the term Massaco came to refer to the indigenous peoples, the river, the village they occupied, and the land adjacent to the river.

The area known as Massaco was transferred to European settlers, when a local Native man, Manahanoose, burnt a large quantity of tar belonging to John Griffin. Manahanoose was arrested and fined 500 fathoms, or 914.4 meters, of wampum. The local Indians did not possess that vast quantity of wampum, so the coithe sachem, or political leader, of the native community deeded the land to Griffin to avoid the initial alternative penalty determined by the General Court of the colony of Connecticut, which would have been to serve Griffin or be exchanged for Black slaves. The "Massaco Division" included the lands around the towns of Canton and Simsbury, as well as parts of Granby, Connecticut.

== See also ==
- Connecticut Colony
