= Hammonasset people =

Historical Native American tribe of Connecticut

Coordinates: 41.2787°N 72.5466°W

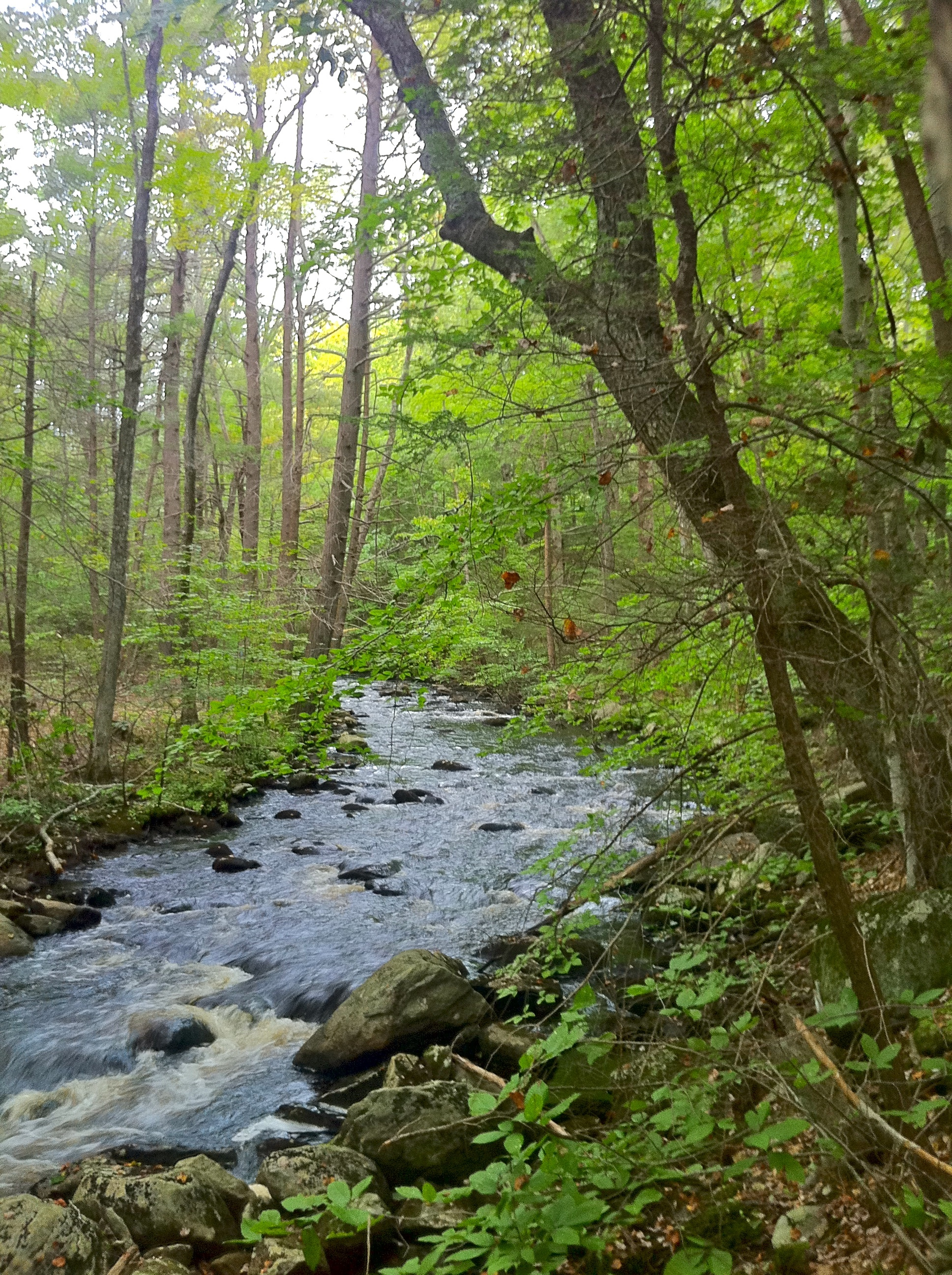
- The Hammonasset River was part of the territory of the Hammonassett people

Total population
- merged into Tunxis people in the mid-18th century

Regions with significant populations
- Connecticut, U.S.

Languages
- Algonquian language

Religion
- Indigenous religion

Related ethnic groups
- Quinnipiac, Tunxis

The Hammonasset people were a historical Indigenous people of the Northeastern Woodlands whose territory was along the west bank of the Connecticut River to the Hammonasset River in Connecticut.

== Language ==
The Hammonasset spoke an Algonquian language.

== Culture ==
In their society, villages were organized by patrilineal clans with names appointed by animal totems. The indigenous people who settled in the area named it Hammonasset, which roughly translates to “where we dig the ground.”

== Economy and subsistence ==
They subsisted by fishing and hunting, and raised corn, beans, and squash. The Hammonasset River was one of the few to have salmon runs.

== History ==
=== 17th century ===
The first European colonists arrived in their territory area in 1638.

They were once a band of Quinnipiac people, who were recorded living near Guilford, Connecticut. Their leader was named Sebequnash, or "The Man Who Weeps."

In 1730, the band's population was 250 to 300 people. By 1774, they were reduced to only 38 people. They moved to Farmington, Connecticut, to live among the Tunxis in 1768.
