= Griffin (ship) =

History
- Name: Griffin

General characteristics
- Complement: 300

Griffin was the name of a 17th-century ship known to have sailed between England and English settlements along Massachusetts Bay in British America. Several historical and genealogical references show Griffin making such journeys in 1633 and 1634.

The 1633 journey left from Downs, England, and landed at Plymouth in Plymouth Colony on September 3. This 1633 journey carried religious dissidents, including Thomas Hooker, Samuel Stone, John Cotton, and others totaling 200 people. The ship Griffin weighed in at 300 tons and she saw the birth of at least one child, Seaborn Cotton, during the 1633 voyage.

In 1634 Griffin carried Anne Hutchinson to the Massachusetts colony. Hutchinson's oldest son had preceded her the previous year, also on Griffin.

There are at least several other ships known to have used Griffin or similar names in preceding or following centuries. Most if not all such non-17th-century references probably refer to another vessel carrying the same name, such as the Danish warship Griffen, which sailed the Baltic Sea in the late 15th century, or Robert de La Salle's ship Le Griffon, which sailed the Great Lakes in the late 17th century.
