= Mattabesset =

Mattabesset was a region and settlement once occupied by the Wangunk, a historical Native American tribe, along the Connecticut River. The Mattabesset River reaches the Connecticut River near Middletown, Connecticut. European settler colonists established Middletown on the part of the region on the west side of the river, and a succession of settlements on the east side of the river, including Chatham and Middle Haddam, became East Hampton, Connecticut.

== Name ==
Romanizations vary widely, including Mattabesec, Mattabeseck, Mattabessett, Mattabesset, and Mattabéeset. However, it is widely known to be pronounced “Matta-bess-ic” despite usually being spelled “mattabesset”

== History ==
This region was occupied by Wangunk, an Algonquian language-speaking Indigenous people of the Northeastern Woodlands. Dutch colonizers initially visited the region in 1614. At the time of English incursions into the area, the local sachem, or Native political leader, was Sowheag, also known as Sequin. After conflict with settlers, he moved from the village of Pyquaug, later known as Weathersfield, Connecticut, to Mattabesett.

Nineteenth-century historian John Warner Barber wrote:

The lands in this township were obtained from the Indians in connection with the lands in Middletown. But a reservation, laid out partly at Indian hill, and partly a little east of the Chatham meeting house, was held by them till about 1767; when, having dwindled to small number, they sold their right, and united with the Farmington Indians. These Indians have been sometimes called Wongonks or Wongoms, but the reservation was for the heirs of the Sowheag and Mattabessett Indians, and they were doubtless of the same tribe with the Indians on the west side of the river. A little clan inhabited, or frequented, the region about Pocotopogue pond, and had a place of rendezvous on the principal island which that encloses. These were also, probably, a part of the Mattabessett Indians.

In 1650, the General Court of Connecticut sent researchers to the Mattabesett region, who concluded that Middletown and Chatham could support 15 families. Sowheag apparently had ceded some of the land to Governor John Haynes.

Connecticut established three reservations for the Wangunk people in Middletown and Chatham. The Wangunk occupied one in the Newfield neighborhood of Middletown through 1713. In Chatham, one was established for a man named Sawsean and his descendants. The third, 300 acres, was established for Sowheag, the sachem of Mattabesett, and the Native peoples of Mattabesett. In a 1761 survey of Indigenous peoples in Connecticut, local Native peoples still resided at "Mattabéeset (at Wongunck, opposite Middletown)."

Archaeologist Bert Salwen writes, "Names like Nipmuck, Pocumtuck, and Mattabesec sometimes appear in the literature as designations for large 'tribes' or 'confederacies' (Speck 1928a: pl. 20; Swanton 1952), but this usage does not seem to fit the seventeenth-century situation. At best, some of these names may reflect linguistic or cultural homogeneity, but the scarcity of evidence makes even linguistic identification difficult in most cases (Day 1962, 1969)." Both Salwen and Ives Goddard contest the idea of a "great Delaware-speaking Wappinger-Mattabesec confederacy stretching from the Hudson to the Connecticut" rivers.

== See also ==
- Mattabesset River
- Mattabesett Trail
