= Haddam Island State Park =

Park in Haddam, Connecticut, US

- Location within Connecticut Location within the United States
- Location: Haddam, Connecticut, United States
- Coordinates: 41°29′30″N 72°31′5″W
- Area: 14 acres (5.7 ha)
- Elevation: 10 ft (3.0 m)
- Established: 1944
- Administrator: Connecticut Department of Energy and Environmental Protection
- Designation: Connecticut state park
- Website: Official website

Haddam Island State Park is an undeveloped 14-acre (5.7 ha) island in the lower Connecticut River in the town of Haddam, Connecticut, in the United States. The park is only accessible by boat. Recommended activities are boating, fishing, and birdwatching.

== History ==
The English settlers in the Connecticut Colony originally named the island Thirty Mile Island because it was erroneously believed to be 30 miles (48 km) north of the Connecticut River's mouth. The original English settlement in the area was called Thirty Mile Island Plantation. In May 1662, an area of 150 square miles (390 km^{2}) of land, including the island, was sold by the Wangunk tribe to the English settlers for 30 coats. However, the natives reserved the right to use the island as part of the sale stipulations. Though little documentation exists today, the Wangunk tribe lived on the island and in the surrounding area before selling it along with the rest of their land. Recorded deeds show that the Wangunk tribe made another land sale in 1672, and the remaining parcels of Wangunk land were sold between 1765 and 1769.

At the close of the 18th century, the island was one of the most important fishing locations on the Connecticut River. By 1819, the island was listed as 18 acres (7.3 ha) in area and was expected to increase in size following the construction of a pier 90 rods north of the island, which caused the accumulation of sand at the head of the island. The island is currently listed as 14 acres (5.7 ha) in size. In the 19th century, two fishing companies operated from the island and constructed piers, and the island was also used for grazing cattle and farming corn. Records in the late 19th century indicate that the Haddam Island area of the Connecticut River was dredged annually. The island became a popular recreational area with picnics and private events in the beginning of the 20th century. The island was purchased by the State of Connecticut in 1944, and it became a state park. According to legend, Captain Kidd buried some of his treasure on the island, but none has been found.

== Activities ==
Haddam Island State Park is home to a large number of bird species, especially during annual migrations, which make it suitable for birdwatching. Bird-banding and other research activities have taken place on the island. Other recommended activities are boating and fishing. Access via boat is available from the Haddam Meadows State Park boat launch, a half mile south of Haddam Island. The northern side of the island has a beach that is fragile and cannot support heavy visitation, and the island has a significant amount of poison ivy.
