= Quinnipiac =

Historic Native American group

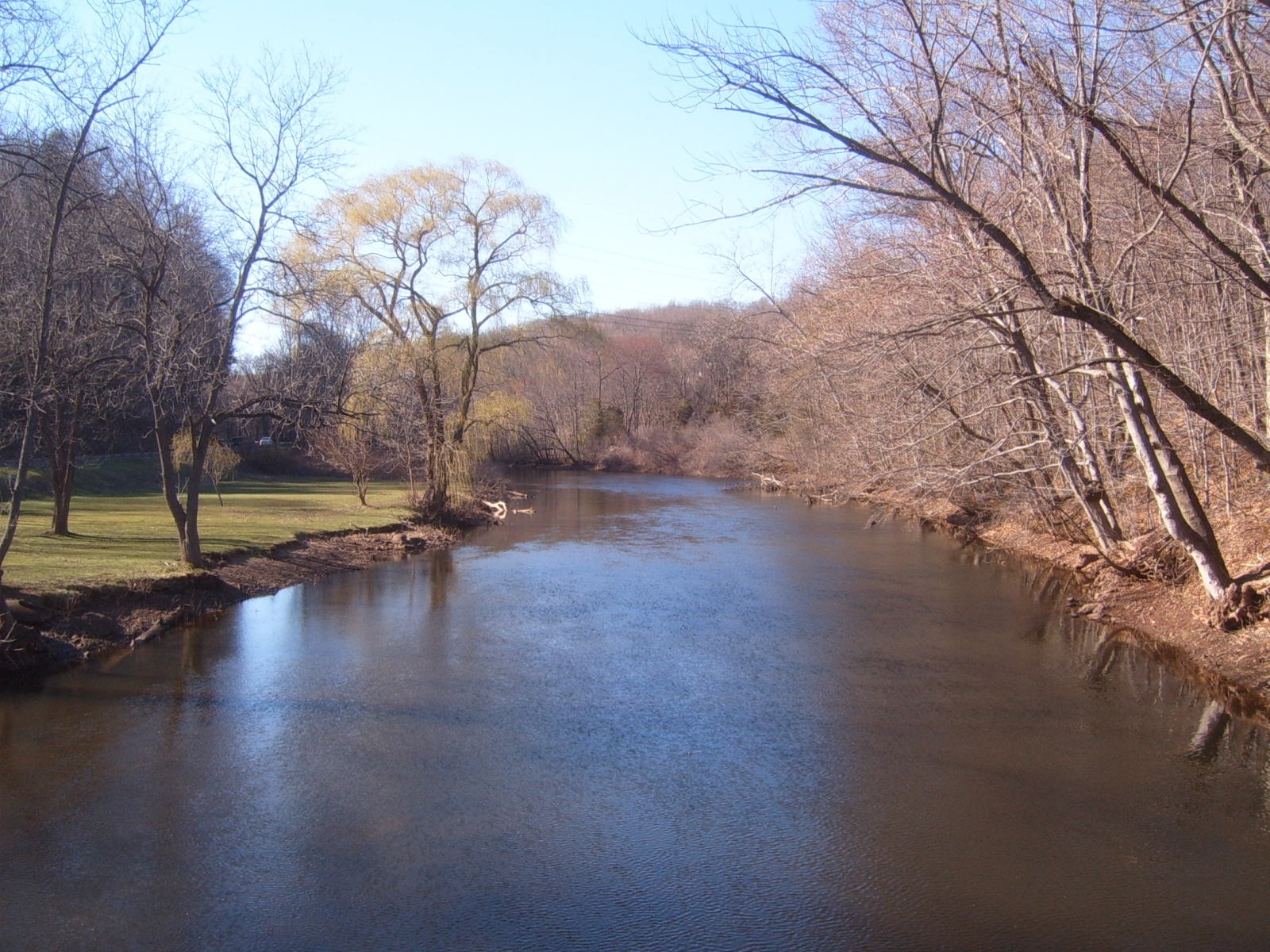
- The Quinnipiac River looking west into the Quinnipiac River Gorge

Total population
- extinct as a tribe; merged into the Stockbridge Munsee Community and Brotherton Indian Community, now in Wisconsin

Regions with significant populations
- United States (Connecticut)

Languages
- Quiripi language

Religion
- Indigenous religion

Related ethnic groups
- other Wappinger peoples

The Quinnipiac were a historical Indigenous people of the Northeastern Woodlands. They lived in present-day New Haven County, Connecticut, along the Quinnipiac River. Their primary village, also called Quinnipiac, was where New Haven, Connecticut is today.

== Name ==
The Quinnipiac name translates as "Long-water people." It was also spelled Quienepiage, Quenepiake, Qunnipiéuk, Qunnipiuck, Qunnipiug, Quinnpiipuck, Quunnipieuck, and Qvinipiak.

== Language ==
The Quinnipiac and several neighboring tribes in central Connecticut and central Long Island all spoke Quiripi, an Eastern Algonquian language. Reverend Abraham Pierson translated the catechism into Quiripi in 1658. Reverend Ezra Stiles and Thomas Jefferson both collected word lists in Quiripi. The language went extinct in the late 19th century.

== Political structure ==
Seventeenth century colonist and writer on Indian tribes Daniel Gookin asserted the Quinnipiac were part of the Pequot; this association is unlikely, given that the Quinnipiac sought military protection from the Pequot and Mohawk in their first treaty with English settlers. 19th-century historian Edward Manning Ruttenber regarded the Quinnipiac as part of the Wappinger confederacy. The Quinnipiac tribal leader was a sachem. The Totoket people were part of the Quinnipiac sachemdom. The Hammonasset were likely also part of the Quinnipiac sachemdom.

== History ==
=== 17th century ===
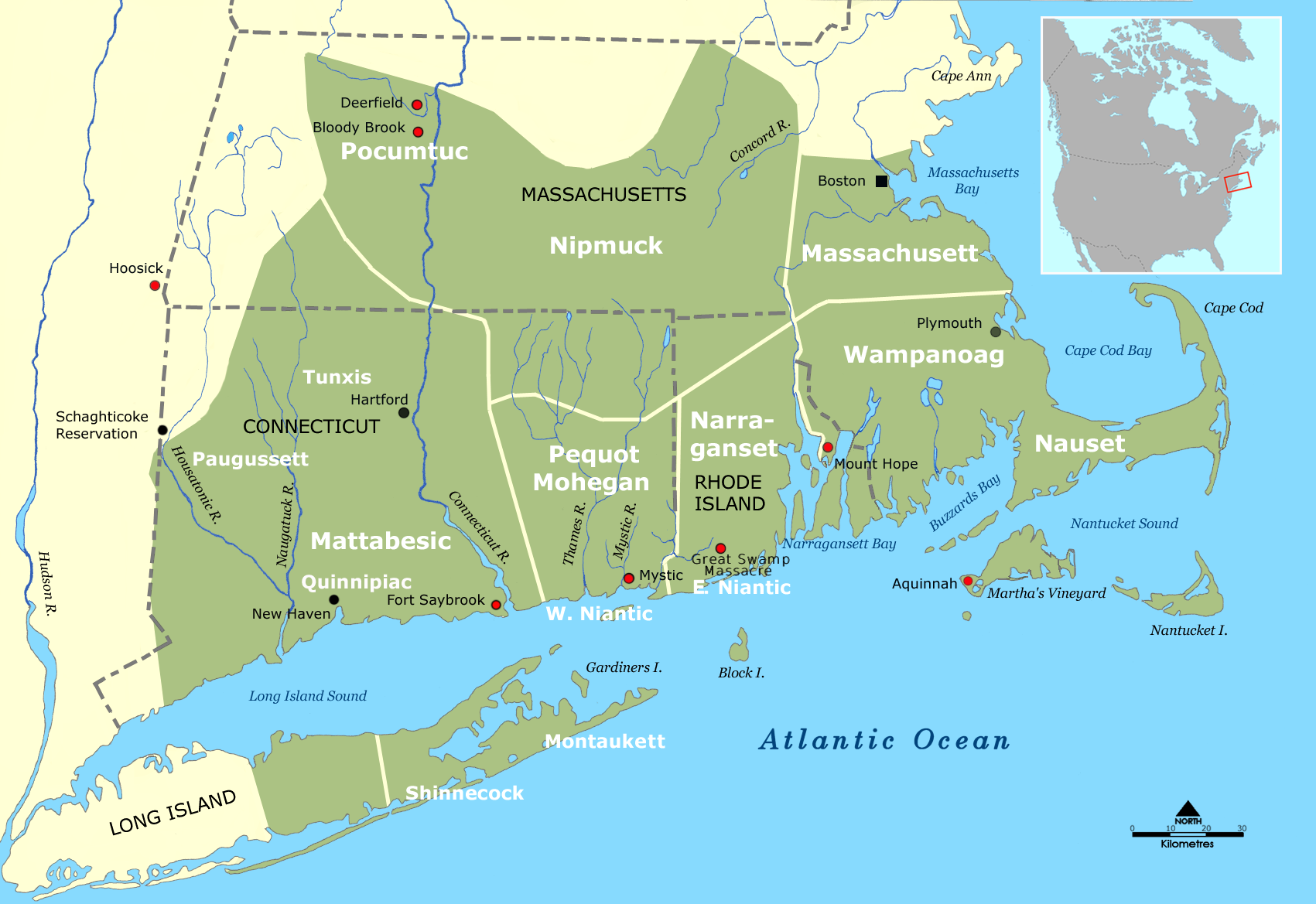
The Quinnipiac and their neighbors, ca. 1600 CE

The Puritans established the first Indian Reservation in 1638. Located near New Haven, Connecticut, the reserve was for the Quinnipiac, but only included 1,200 acres, a small portion of their original territory. The reservation's residents, described as "free" Indians, were placed under the authority of an English agent. They were not allowed to sell or abandon that land, and Native peoples from other tribes were not allowed to visit.

From around 1651 to 1669, Reverend Abraham Pierson, a Congregational minister, proselytized the Quinnipiac near Branford, Connecticut. He translated Christian texts into the Quiripi language. Missionization was not very successful, and the tribe showed "a perverse contempt" for the church.

=== 18th century ===
In 1730, there were an estimated 250 to 300 Quinnipiac. In 1768, some Quinnipiac left their reservation and joined the Tunxi near Farmington, Connecticut. In 1774, only an estimated 38 Quinnipiac survived. They were part of the large Mahican tribe, whose descendants ultimately migrated to Wisconsin with the Stockbridge Munsee Community and Brotherton Indian Community.

== Sources ==
- Aoki, Andrew L.; Schultz, Jeffrey D.; Kaynie, Kerry L., eds. (2000). Encyclopedia of Minorities in American Politics: Hispanic Americans and Native Americans. Phoenix, AZ: Oryx Press. ISBN 978-1-57356-149-5.
- Hodge, Frederick Webb (1910). Handbook of American Indians North of Mexico: N-Z. Washington, DC: U.S. Government Printing Office.
- Swanton, John Reed (1952). The Indian Tribes of North America. Genealogical Publishing Com. pp. 102–03. ISBN 9780806317304.
