= Wawaloam =

Wawaloam (before 1620 – after 1661) (also known as Wararme) was a leader of the Narragansett tribe in Rhode Island, and she was the wife of Miantonomi.

Wawaloam was a daughter of Sowheag (often mis-stated to be Sequasson), an ally of Miantonomi, who was likely a Wangunk or Nipmuc sachem living near the Connecticut River. The name "Wawaloam" may refer to the flight of a sparrow in the Nipmuc language.

In 1632 Wawaloam and Miantinomi visited Governor John Winthrop at his home in Boston, Massachusetts. In 1638 Wawaloam and Miantonomi marched with Roger Williams to Hartford with one hundred warriors to negotiate with the authorities there for Providence's protection. In June of 1661 while at her village of Aspanansuck (Exeter Hill) Wawaloam signed an affidavit regarding Misquamicut, which she swore was taken from the Pequots and given to Socho (Sassawwaw) for military services rendered prior to the Pequot War (1637). In the late 1800s a farmer in Exeter, Rhode Island William M. Bailey, created a stone memorial to Wawaloan using a large boulder, and later, the nearby school in Exeter was named after her. A campground in nearby Richmond, Rhode Island is also named after Wawaloam as is a bridge on the South County trail.
