= Samuel Stone =

American puritan minister (1602–1663)

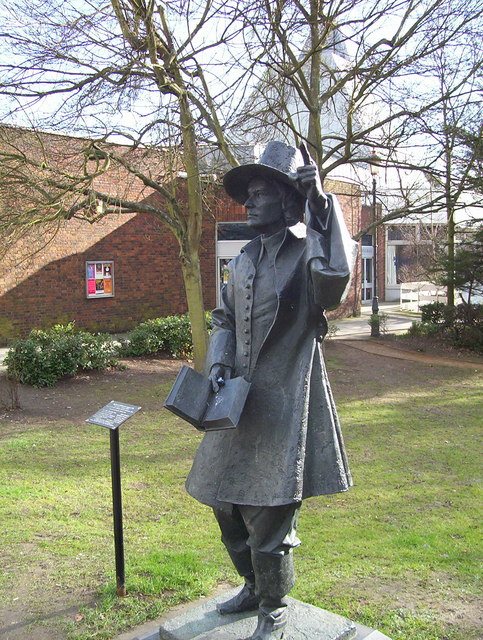
- The statue of Samuel Stone in Hertford, England.
- Born: July 18, 1602; Hertford, Hertfordshire, England
- Died: July 20, 1663 (aged 61); Hartford, Connecticut, English America
- Known for: Co-founder of Hartford, Connecticut

Samuel Stone (July 18, 1602 – 20 July 1663) was an English Puritan minister and co-founder of Hartford, Connecticut.

== Biography ==
Stone was born in Hertford, the county town of Hertfordshire, England. The name of the town is pronounced "Hartford".

In 1620, he left Hertford to study at Emmanuel College, Cambridge, from where he graduated in 1624. He was ordained on July 8, 1626, at Peterborough and a year later became curate at Stisted, Essex. In 1633, Samuel Stone and Thomas Hooker sailed across the Atlantic on a ship named the Griffin. They arrived in Boston on 4 September of the same year, and a few weeks later, Samuel Stone became a Teacher of the Cambridge Church under Hooker, who was the preacher. In 1644, he became a Freeman. In 1636, Stone and Hooker led their congregation from New Towne (now Cambridge, Massachusetts) and established a new colony at House of Hope (a Dutch fort and trading post), making peace with the local Indians and renaming the town they called Saukiog as Hartford, after Stone's birthplace - they thus became the town's founding fathers.

== Personal life ==
Stone was twice married. By his second wife, Elizabeth Allyn, whom he wed in 1641, he had four surviving children—a son Samuel and four daughters, Elizabeth, Rebecca, Mary and Sarah. He published "A Congregational Church, a Catholike Visible Church" in London in 1642, in answer to Samuel Hudson's "Visible Catholick Church", and left two works in manuscript: a catechism and a confutation of the Antinomians. Records show that he was an active buyer and seller of land in Hartford.

There is a statue of Samuel Stone in the centre of Hertford, Hertfordshire.
