= Wangunk =

Historical Indigenous people of Connecticut, US

Wangunk Mattabesec
Total population
- No longer exists as a distinct tribe, some descendants merged into the Brotherton Indians

Regions with significant populations
- United States (Connecticut)

Languages
- Munsee language and Quiripi language

Religion
- Indigenous religion

Related ethnic groups
- Other Wappinger peoples and other Algonquian peoples

The Wangunk or Mattabesec refers to a collection of closely related Indigenous peoples of the Northeastern Woodlands all from central Connecticut. Many were members of the Wappinger, a Munsee-speaking confederacy. The Wangunk settled along the Connecticut River.

Prior to English arrival, the Wangunk had three major settlements along the Connecticut River, in the areas of the present-day towns of Portland, Middletown, and Wethersfield. They also used lands in other parts of what were later organized by English settlers as Middlesex and Hartford counties.

There are no Wangunk state-recognized tribes or federally recognized tribes.

Wangunk descendants, scholars at Wesleyan University, and the City of Middletown, Connecticut have made public statements affirming the Wangunk peoples' continuance and highlighting their historic erasure.

== Name ==
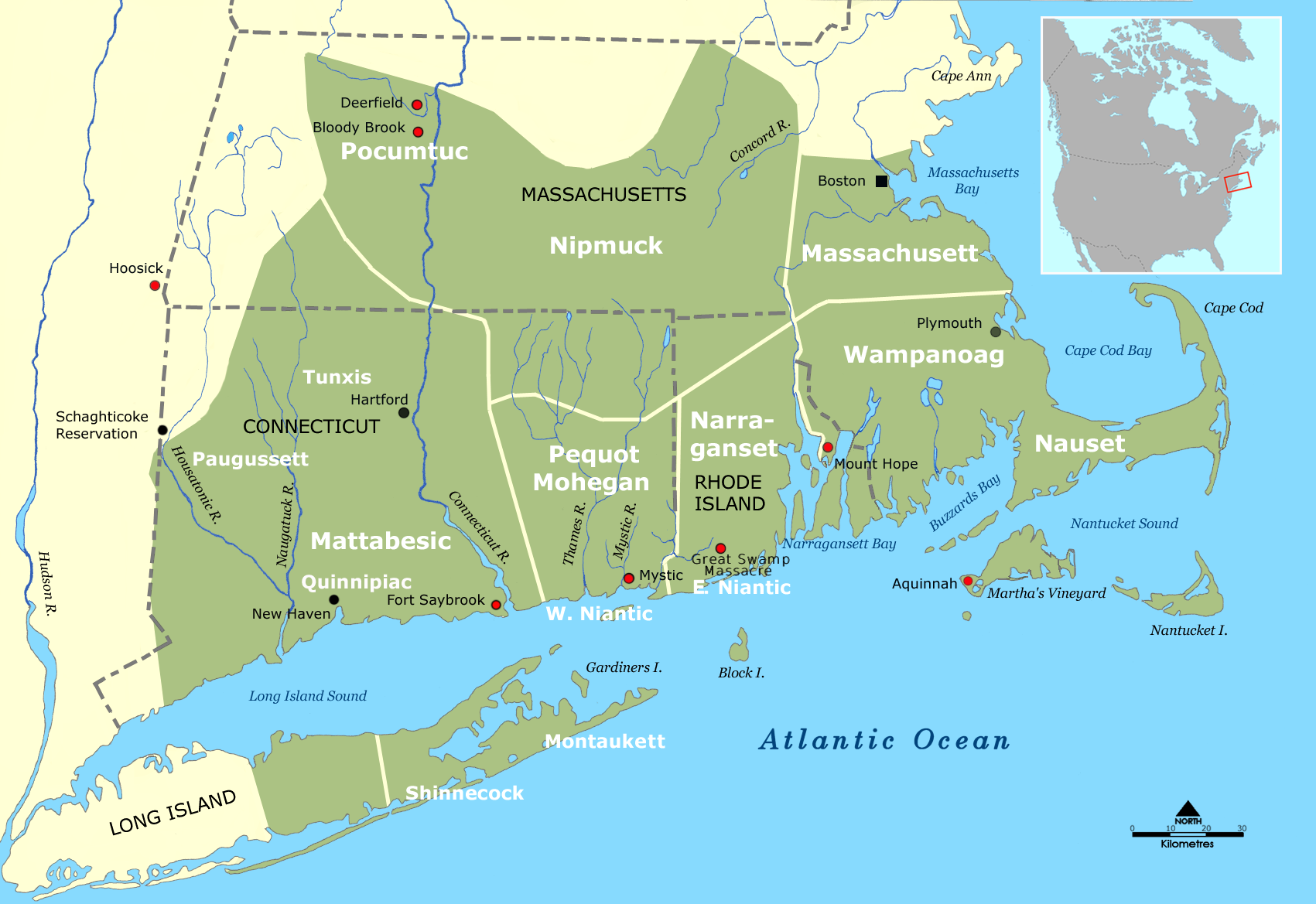
Tribal territories of Southern New England tribes about 1600. Grey dotted lines are approximate modern political boundaries.

The Wangunk were also called Wangums and Wongunk. Anthropologist John Reed Swanton called them the Mattabesec. Their name has also been written as Mattabessett or Mattabesch, but Wangunk is the name used by scholars and by contemporary Wangunk descendants.

The Wangunk and Mattabesec historically were separate and independent sachemships, but both terms came to be used to refer to a collection of Indigenous nations in central Connecticut with close kin ties who have no known common ethnonym.

== Language ==
Swanton writes that the Mattabesec were the most important nation of Wappinger confederacy, who spoke an Eastern Algonquian language.

Before European contact, the Wangunk spoke Quiripi, an Eastern Algonquian language which is part of the large Algonquian language family. They had strong connections with other of the many Algonquian nations, whose territory was along the Atlantic coast and rivers leading to the sea.

== Territory ==
Wangunk people lived in and near present-day Middletown, Haddam, and Portland, Connecticut, at the time the English arrived. Originally located around Hartford and Wethersfield, but displaced by settlers there, they relocated to the land around the oxbow bend in the Connecticut River. Before English settlement, there were at least half a dozen villages around the area on both sides of the river. Of these, Mattabassett (or Mattabesseck, Matabesset) was the name most associated with the Wangunk by the English (corresponding with Middletown). Other villages include Pocowset (Portland), Cockaponet (Haddam), Coginchaug, Cononnacock, and Machamodus. The Wangunk are also sometimes referred to as "the River People" because of their positioning within the fertile Connecticut River valley.

When the English settled and established Middletown on the west side of the river, the designated Wangunk reservation land was mainly on the East side of the river bend, with a small parcel on the West side, an area near where Indian Hill Cemetery was developed in 1850. Wongunk is also used to describe a meadow in Portland that was part of the Wangunk reservation. As the Wangunk felt pressure from the settlers for the land, they sold off portions of this land and joined either neighboring tribes such as the Tunxis (Farmington, Connecticut). The people formed new communities of Christian Indians, relocating to central New York, and then to the Great Lakes area, settling in Wisconsin. Others went to Indian Territory, which later became Oklahoma.

== History ==
=== Precolonial society ===
Like other Algonquian groups, the Wangunk political leadership rested with an individual leader called a sachem, based on English settler documentation. Most Algonquian social structures were known to be based on a matrilineal kinship system, by which inheritance and property passed through the maternal line. Children were considered born to their mother's family and clan. The women shared responsibilities and power within the tribe. The Wangunk seem to be consistent with this type. They lived off the seasonal economies of the region. Contemporary scholars think they migrated between two villages: one for winter and spring, another for summer and fall.

=== European contact (1614–1673) ===
The first known Wangunk interaction with Europeans was in 1614 with traders from the Dutch East India Company. The Wangunk's proximity to the Connecticut River made their homeland desirable for European fur traders, leading to conflicts with the Pequot tribe over the area. The Wangunk allied with Narragansett and reached out to English settlers as a defensive strategy against the Pequot.

Alliances may have shifted with the outbreak of the Pequot War in 1636. Colonial accounts suggest that Wangunk sachem Sequassen assisted the Pequot in their attack on Wethersfield, where he resided at the time. Around the same time, Sowheage relocated to Mattabesett, later to be developed as Middletown. This movement and the confusion of the war may be reasons why Middletown was not founded until 1650, later than other towns in the region. During this period, Natives and settlers living at Middletown are documented as engaging in a series of land transactions, culminating in a written reservation deed in 1673.

Land transactions between the Wangunk and settlers took place within the European legal system of land ownership. This is based on concepts of individual property and land improvement – to be a proprietor is to own land individually and to work to "improve" it. Settlers often did not recognize Native communal ways of farming as "improvement". The Wangunk had a communal relationship to land. No single person or group had definite claim to a particular piece of land, and land could therefore not be bought or sold.

English colonial law did not recognize Native ways of owning land. Therefore, in order to keep claim to their lands amongst settler expropriation, Wangunk worked within the system of land proprietorship, at least for the purposes of legal documentation.

=== Early reservation period: 1673–1732 ===
After the establishment of Middletown in 1650, Connecticut's government reserved approximately 350 acres of land on the east side of the Connecticut River for the descendants of Wangunk sachem Sowheage and the Wangunk tribe. The reservation remained undefined until 1673, when 13 of Sowheage's heirs signed a document which created two parcels, one of 50 acres at Indian Hill and another of 250 acres upland, on the east side of the Connecticut River. Reservation land was specified as belonging to Wangunk heirs forever. In Wangunk Meadow, next to the reservation land on the east side of Connecticut River, individual Wangunk households owned plots amounting to 9 acres.

Wangunk land ownership remained largely communal into the reservation period. Those who signed deeds did not necessarily "own" the land, and therefore sales were often contested by other Wangunk. Most Wangunk in this period were unable to read English deeds. The establishment of the reservation was economically harmful to the Wangunk, who needed a larger area of land to carry on their traditional agricultural and hunting practices. The lack of economic opportunities led to poverty and debt. During this period some Wangunk were enslaved by or became indentured to English colonists.

King Philip's War broke out in 1675 as a united Indian resistance movement. The Wangunk, along with many other tribes, remained neutral. This neutrality may have been coerced, as English people passed a series of laws during this period limiting Indian economic opportunities and access to weapons, and demanding hostages from tribes.

During and after King Philip's War, some Wangunk sold land to colonists, often to pay debts. The English population of Middletown grew, and in the late 17th century, colonists began building homes on Wangunk Meadows on the east bank of the river next to the reservation. In 1714, this group of settlers split from Middletown and formed the Third Society of Middletown, which had its own meetinghouse and separate leadership. By 1713, the Wangunk had been forced to vacate the Mattabessett portion of the reservation, which was in central Middletown.

=== Later reservation period: 1732–1767 ===
Settler encroachment on Indian land accelerated in 1732 when the Third Society got a new pastor, who built his home on the reservation. Some Wangunk began converting to Christianity during this period, resulting in migration to Christian communities. In 1746, the Third Society petitioned the Connecticut General Assembly for a new meeting house and were granted land on the Wangunk reservation. The meeting house served to justify increased settler claims to reservation land, which they said the Wangunk were not putting to proper use.

In 1757, after two petitions from settlers to the Connecticut General Assembly, Wangunk Richard Ranney, who lived away from the reservation, made a land claim and was granted 10 acres. Settlers petitioned twice more for the privilege to buy the reservation lands. In 1762, a group of male Wangunk submitted a memorial to the assembly requesting that the entire reservation be sold. A committee approved this request, citing the fact that only women and children were left on the reservation. The group of Wangunk left on the reservation were unable to support themselves, so part of the sale of their land went to payment of debts. During this time, several Wangunk men are known to have served in the French and Indian War in order to gain employment. In 1767, the Third Society officially became the town of Chatham (later Portland).

=== Post-Reservation and Wangunk Diaspora: 1767–1813 ===
In 1769, ten Wangunk including Samuel Ashpo in Farmington, Connecticut asked permission to sell their lands at Wangunk. The last piece of Wangunk reservation land in Chatham was sold somewhere between 1772 and 1784. The aged widow Mary Cushoy was living there with three children. The town selectmen persuaded her to sell the reservation about 1771, saying they had paid to support her family, and aided other Wangunk. In 1772, the town spent more than 90 pounds to support Cushoy. They paid themselves back by the sale of the land. After the sale of Cushoy's land, the Wangunk "seem, at that time, to have entirely left the place. Thus ended the national existence of the Wangunks," wrote historian John William De Forest in 1853.

In the 18th century, many Wangunk moved away from the reservation. Some of these individuals married members of other Native tribes, including Quinnipiac and Mohegan. Individual Wangunk are known to have lived into old age and to have had children on the Mohegan reservation. Some Wangunk served in the American Revolutionary War.

Connecticut historian John William De Forest (1826–1906), wrote that after the sale of the last Wangunk lands: "Mary Cushoy was living on the town of Chatham as late as 1771. Three years later, the number of Indians residing in that township was two. In 1785, a committee was appointed by the Legislature to collect all of the money due on the Indian lands at Wangunk, and pay it over to the proprietors, who seem, at that time, to have entirely left the place. Thus ended the national existence of the Wangunks, or, as they were sometimes called, the Wangums."

Other Wangunk joined the Farmington Indians in Connecticut, a group that formed when the Tunxi invited other Native Americans to move to their reservation and become a new tribe. The Farmington Indians were Christian Indians who later moved to Oneida, New York, where they were given space on the Oneida Reservation. Later, as European Americans encroached on this land, they removed to Brotherton, Wisconsin Territory, named for the people known as the Brotherton Indians. A large number of Wangunk moved to Farmington; many of them participated in the tribe's later movements to new settlement. Despite increased geographic distance, the Wangunk continued to identify as Wangunk, sign land deeds, and return to Middletown for important occasions after moving away.

Bette Nepash, or Old Betty, a Wangunk, held yearly tribal gatherings until the 1810s. These gatherings helped continue a longstanding Wangunk connection to the region. After Nepash's death, Jonathan Palmer was identified as the last Indian in Middletown when he died in 1813. But, the Palmer family line has survived into the present and many members continue to live in Middlesex County.

== Historical figures ==
- Sowheage: When colonists first entered the Connecticut River Valley in the early 17th century, Sowheage (also spelled Sequin or Sowheag) was the grand sachem presiding over all the Wangunk territory, including lands at Pyquag, Wangunk, and Mattabesett. While he was living at Pyquag during this time, Sowheage relocated his seat of power to Mattabessett following a series of conflicts with the English. Harboring animosity for the English, Sowheage has been linked to the Pequot War: he incited the Pequot to attack the colonists and sheltered Pequot warriors. Sowheage died in approximately 1649; he was survived by many children who as adults occupied positions of power long past his death.

Among these children were Montowese, a leader among the Quinnipiac and Wangunk. Another was Sequassen, sachem of Suckiog (Hartford,) who navigated a tense relationship with the colonists in Hartford and challenged the Mohegan leader Uncas for power in the region, removing to Massachusetts after his defeat.

Sowheage's son Turramuggus (b. 1623) assumed leadership in the Wethersfield area and was involved in several large land transactions with the English colonists, signing a 1668 deed of 300 acres to Richard Beckley, a 1672 deed concerning land at Durham, and two deeds during 1673 concerning land at Wethersfield and Eastbury. Additionally, Turramuggus was kept as a hostage in a prison at Hartford during King Philip's War. Turramuggus likely died sometime before 1704.

His son Peetoosh succeeded him as a sachem among the Wangunk, but little was recorded about Peetoosh in surviving colonial documents. Sowheage had another son, Seacutt, and three daughters: Wawarme (aka Wawaloam), Towwehashque, and Sepunnamoe.

- Towwehashque: Towwehashque (died c. 1693), sister of Turramuggus, reigned as Saunks Squaw over Haddam and its surrounding territory, including Thirty Mile Island. Towwehashque (also spelled Townhashque, Towkishk) is noted in the colonial record for selling a piece of Wangunk meadowland to John Clark in 1691. Although she attempted to sell land at Thirty Mile Island to Samuel Wyllys in 1662, this transaction was nullified.

Her daughter Pampenum became responsible for the land in 1697. As sovereign of the island, Pampenum (d. 1704) attempted to keep control over her land for future Wangunk generations through two separate wills, naming Cheehums (aka Wampeawask), wife of the Mohegan sachem Mahomet I, as her successor Saunks Squaw. In addition, she prohibited her descendants from selling the land to any non-Indians. Ultimately, this land was sold in the closing decades of the 18th century, along with other Wangunk reservation land, but Pampenum is noted for her resolve and determination in retaining these lands by using the colonial court system.

- Robin: Robin (Robbins, Robins, sometimes confused with his son Doctor Robin or Puccaca) is thought by some to be another son of Sowheage, but this is unlikely. He was married to the daughter of Chiamugg. In the 1660s, Robin appears in the court records to have lived in Wethersfield. In 1704 Robin, Mashoot, and Sarah Onepenny the Younger inherited small sums from Sarah Hopewell, a Native woman of Wethersfield. She was the daughter of Thomas Hopewell and Ocinne. Robin is listed as one of the "heirs and descendents of Sowheag" in the 1673 confirmatory deed reserving 300 acres of land for the Wangunk on the east side of the Connecticut River.

Robin's son, "Old Robin," was a medicine man in the tribe and acquired the title of "Doctor" among the English for his and his family's ability to heal scrofula. Doctor "Old" Robin died in 1757 and is buried in the Ancient Burying Ground in Hartford. Many of his heirs appear over the years in the colonial record. For instance, his son Samuel Robin, who was living at Tunxis at the time, signed a 1762 petition to the General Assembly indicating that he, his wife Moll, and the other Indian signatories, wished to sell their tribal lands under pressure from the colonists.

- Richard Ranney was born September 8, 1732, to a daughter of Doctor Robin. He died sometime after 1775. He was raised in Newtown, probably by a settler named Richard Ranney, who raised him as a Christian, taught him to speak and write the English language, and trained him as a joiner. While it is unclear what circumstances led Ranney to be raised in a settler family, the Yale Indian Papers Project suggests that he likely served as a type of indentured servant to the family. In 1756, Ranney petitioned the General Assembly for the purchase of 10 acres of Wangunk land from Cushoy, and was granted his appeal in 1758. After that point, Ranney drops from any Wangunk records until 1775, when he enlisted in Capt. William Goodrich's Company of Indians.
- Onepenny family: Onepenny's name first appeared on a deed in 1660 at Stratford Ferry, Connecticut; he is also listed on the deed for Coginchaug, signed in January 1672 or 1673. In 1678, he was recorded as Noquittemaug on the list of persons who ceded their land at Shetucket.

Sarah Onepenny the Elder (d. 1713), was the daughter of Onepenny and Sepunnamoe, the Saunks Squaw in Hartford and Middletown. Hannah Onepenny was her sister. Sarah married Pewampskin, a native man who lived in Wethersfield. They had a daughter, Sarah Onepenny the Younger (d. 1728), possibly another daughter Alice, and three sons: Cushoy, Nannamaroos, and Siana.

Cushoy was the son of Sarah Onepenny the Elder and Pewampskin, and great-grandson of Sowheage. Cushoy was understood by colonists to be the leader of the Wangunk tribe from as early as 1713, when he first signed a deed, until 1763 when he died. This caused controversy in the family, as there was a dispute over who should inherit Turramuggus's sachemship. Additionally, there was a family dispute over who the next Sunk Squaw should be. Cushoy's wife, Asquasuttock, called herself "a native sunksquaw" and "suck squaw of Woongum" in 1718 and 1722, respectively. She was the daughter of Massecuppe and granddaughter of the Narragansett grand sachem, Miantonomoh and his spouse, Wawarme.

In the written record of the surveillance and construction of a highway in 1728, colonists attested that Cushoy spoke "in behalf of ye other Indians." In the 1756 "Memorial of Selectmen of Middletown," the Selectmen of Middletown explain to the Connecticut General Assembly that Cushoy did "not having any [relative] to help him, as his children, all being dead, his grandchildren young." They claim that Cushoy had "been unable to support himself and would have perished for hunger and want of clothing had he not been relieved by the selectmen of said town." Specifically, they tell the General Assembly that they paid about 57 shillings for the care of Cushoy and his son Tom over a year-long period, and that this debt would happily be settled in exchange for the land in question. This petition to the assembly was denied, but the selectmen eventually acquired the land and settled the debt amongst themselves. Cushoy and his wife Asquasuttock (also called Tike or Mary Cushoy), and his sons, Ben and Tom, all died of various illnesses or ill health in 1763, 1771, 1746, and 1755, respectively. Shortly before his death in 1746, Ben Cushoy (alt. sp. Cushaw) bought up many Native rights in the reserved lands.

Sarah Onepenny the Younger was the daughter of Sarah Onepenny the Elder and Pewampskin. Deeds and a declaration by her son Mamooson to the Middletown town clerk in 1726 show she was married to a man named Kickemus (aka Kembosh and Keepamug). She signed a deed known as the "Eastbury deed" (Glastonbury), which ceded hundreds of acres east of the Connecticut River to the representatives of Wethersfield. She had three sons, Mamooson, Long Simon and Peter Sanchuse (d. 1729), as well as one nephew, Scipio. She willed her entire estate to her nephew Scipio Twoshoes in 1727. The land she deeded was called Wongog and was in or near Middletown.

Members of the Onepenny Family are featured in a pamphlet by Joseph Barrett, "Indian Proprietors of Mattebeseck and Their Descendants (n.d., ca. 1850)," that has many errors. Barrett incorrectly understood Mamooson's genealogy, for example. He identified the man Pewampskin as the "sunksquaw," when the sunksquaw was a woman, Sarah Onepenny the Elder. Any reliance on Barrett, therefore, should be with caution.

- Jonathan Palmer (unknown-1819), referred to improperly by Carl Price as "Jonathan Indian," was a Wangunk man who lived in East Hampton. His descendants still reside there. In 1818, a local doctor, John Richmond, sought "a complete human skeleton with which to demonstrate to his students the fine points of anatomy." He reportedly thought, "What a fine skeleton Jonathan Indian would make!" Richmond offered Jonathan "a pint of rum every month" in exchange for "the possession of his body after death for medical purposes." By 1819, Jonathan was dead, likely as a result of alcoholism. As his family began to mourn the loss of their "lamented grandfather," Doctor Richmond arrived at their door with the "ratified contract" for his possession of their grandfather's body. Though Palmer's family protested when Doctor Richmond threatened to "have the law on them," they relented, and Richmond took the body.

== Wangunk landmarks ==
- Lake Pocotopaug is a site that has been mentioned in many different accounts of the Wangunk people as an area that they frequented for fishing and hunting. It is located in what is now called East Hampton, and is approximately 9 miles in circumference. Many arrowheads have been found along the banks of the river. The Wangunk did not record what the site meant to their people. But English settlers told many "Indian stories" about the lake since the 1700s; these are uncorroborated.
- Indian Hill Cemetery: During the Reservation period, the territory of what became Indian Hill Cemetery was a part of the initial Wangunk reservation. In the mid-19th century, the mostly ethnic English residents, who dominated the population, created the cemetery for their own use, in part to change the association of Indian Hill as having been central to Wangunk life. The gates to the cemetery include an image of a stereotypical "noble savage"; this is one of the only markers of the land's colonial history and present.

The meaning of Indian Hill for the settlers' descendants developed in the context of the 19th-century rural cemetery movement. As Kavanagh states: "as American citizens realized that their experiment in republican government had the potential for a "limitless future," they were faced with the daunting task of constructing for themselves an "immemorial past.

For the 1850 founding of the cemetery this poem was read:

On this high place, that swells so fair,
O'er town and river, grove and lea,
We stand, O God, with song and prayer.
To give these grounds to Death and Thee.
To Death, thy servant, who, of old,
With tomahawk and arrowy spear,
As by our fathers we are told,
Hath reaped a bloody harvest here.

- Wangunk meadows: This was one of the areas that the Wangunk continued to occupy after English settlers arrived in 1650 to set up Middletown. There are records noting the fertility of the meadowland and Wangunk cultivation of corn in this area. According to present-day landmarks, the meadowland is located between the Connecticut River and Route 17, and has both hilly and low terrain.

There are many records of settlers being interested in this land and asking the courts to purchase small section of land at different points in time. In his analysis of land distribution, Timothy Ives noted that "Indians tended to hold upland communally while village plots and scattered meadowland were occupied and used by individual settler households." Ives describes the process of dispossession of small plots of land, which he said resulted in different farming areas being cultivated by the Wangunk and the colonizers by the late 1600s.

- Family Cemetery in East Hampton
- Deer Island: Haddam Island State Park, formerly known as Deer Island and Wangunk Island, served as part of the Wangunk reservation until the late 18th century.

== Religion ==
=== Conversion efforts ===
Throughout colonial New England and the Connecticut River Valley, colonial efforts to convert native populations to Christianity were carried out both by individuals and town governments. Conversion to Christianity also often required the rejection of Wangunk language, culture, and family. Rev. Richard Treat established a school for Wangunk children in 1734, which aimed to teach Christian scripture and morality, in addition to the English language. But, lacking community funding, the school closed four months later.

== Descendants ==
In 2003, Van Thomas Green, who claimed to be a Wangunk descendant (through Betty Cuschoy, his great-great-aunt), filed suit against the town of Portland, Wesleyan University, and other parties. He sought $10 million in damages or compensation, the return of 300 acres to tribal descendants, and federal recognition for his family as a tribe. The case was dismissed in a US District Court due to the plaintiff's lack of standing. In his complaint Green alleged that Indian burial grounds in Glastonbury and Portland, Connecticut, have been desecrated; that from 1799 to 2003 tribal lands were unlawfully transferred in violation of 25 U.S.C. § 177; and that agreements regarding 300 acres of land set aside for the heirs of the Wangunk band of Indians were not honored. The court ruled that he was unable to establish any causal connection between the injury and/or conduct complained of and some challenged action of defendants Wesleyan University and others. Elements of this lawsuit are treated in a student documentary, The Last of the Wangunks, which features Green. The video also includes interviews with Gary O'Neil and genealogist Vicki Welch, Director at Seven Generations Research, both of whom challenge Green's claims to being a Wangunk descendant.

Wangunk descendant Gary O'Neil "Red Oak" has said that "hundreds of Wangunks" are living today, including in Connecticut, Massachusetts, and Rhode Island. O'Neil, a descendant of Jonathan Palmer (Wangunk) through his father's line, has been an organizer and leader of the Wangunk in Connecticut since the 1970s. He and his daughter Kyle have exhibited work honoring their Wangunk heritage.

In 2023, City of Middletown presented a proclamation to Gary O'Neil in recognition of Indigenous Peoples' Day. A press release by the Mayor's office stated: "The Wangunk people are the native inhabitants and caretakers of the land in and around Middletown, and have lived in this area for thousands of years. The Wangunk people have persisted to this day through their resiliency and spirit". In 2024, the Mayor's office issued a press release stating that "all of the Middletown area ... is Wangunk land," and highlighted the importance of "bring[ing] awareness and recognition to the Wangunk people.

In November 2025, Wesleyan University held a two-day symposium, "World of the Wangunk." Wesleyan students Fiona O'Reilly and Angelica Mock wrote that "the Wangunk community has not been erased, but is instead vibrant and present".
