= Tunxis =

Historical Native American tribe from Connecticut

Total population
- Extinct as a tribe

Regions with significant populations
- United States (Connecticut)

Languages
- an Eastern Algonquian language

Religion
- Indigenous religion

Related ethnic groups
- Other Wappinger tribes and other Algonquian peoples

The Tunxis were an Indigenous peoples of the Northeastern Woodlands from Connecticut. They were a tribe of Wappinger people who spoke an Eastern Algonquian language and are mainly known to history through their interactions with English settlers in New England.

Also known as the Sepous, they were one of several Native communities in the lower Connecticut River Valley who shared common cultural traits.

In 1634, shortly after English colonists migrating from the Massachusetts Bay Colony moved into the region, a smallpox epidemic swept through the region, killing many of the Natives. The Tunxis people would have been as affected as the other groups.

== 17th century ==
At the time the English colonization began, the main settlement of the Tunxis was on the Farmington River, some distance upstream from its confluence with the Connecticut River. In 1640, the Tunxis sold their agricultural fields to the governor of the Connecticut Colony, who was acting on behalf of a group of colonists from nearby Hartford, who called their new settlement Farmington. The Tunxis retained an area beside the Farmington River that came to be called “Indian Neck.” This deed was confirmed by another deed in 1650.

In the 1640s, the Tunxis community may have had between 100 and 150 members. Relations with the colonists were often uneasy, and the Tunxis were also involved in multiple meetings and skirmishes with other tribes. Because of this, in 1658, the General Court ordered the group to move its settlement from the east side of the Farmington River, very close to the center of the white settlement, to a site on the west side, on high ground soon known as "Fort Hill". In 1673, the Tunxis' disagreement with the Farmington settlers about the limits of the earlier sale led to the execution of a new confirmatory deed, with 200 acres of upland reserved to the Indians; their continuing ownership of the land at Indian Neck was confirmed in a postscript to the deed. Perhaps as a result of this recent amicable agreement, the Tunxis did not flee their homes or join with the Indians during King Philip’s War (1675-1676), and some served as scouts for the colonists’ forces. In 1688, the Tunxis demonstrated their friendliness by allowing a local Englishmen to suggest who he felt their sachem (leader) should be, and accepted his choice.

== 18th century ==
Encroachment on the Tunxis landholdings by English colonists caused them to make at least two complaints to the Connecticut General Assembly during the 18th century. In 1738, a petition claimed that most of Indian Neck had been taken over by non-Indian neighbors, but no action was taken. In 1768, one James Wauwus (with others) presented another petition, which stated that the English had taken over all of Indian Neck. A committee appointed by the legislature found that only four of a multitude of deeds had been properly validated by the legislature, but then recommended recognizing many of the others anyway. Wauwus and others protested, and the General Assembly rejected the report, but exactly what happened after that is not clear.

The Tunxis village of Massaco was vacated by 1750. In 1768, surviving Hammonasset people merged into the Tunxis tribe living in Farmington, Connecticut.

Over time, the Tunxis had become largely Christianized and sold parts of their remaining land to settle debts. As more and more European settlers crowded into Farmington, the idea of moving away to secure more land and the company of more people like themselves held more appeal. In 1774, the Tunxis decided to sell their remaining lands and use the proceeds to move to the Brothertown settlement in the Oneida territory in New York. A few remained behind; Samson Occom counted eight in 1785.

== 19th century ==
Some members of these families lingered in town until the late 19th century.

== See also ==
- Massaco, a Tunxis settlement
