= Mohegan Congregational Church =

Native American owned church building

Coordinates: 41°28′24″N 72°05′54″W

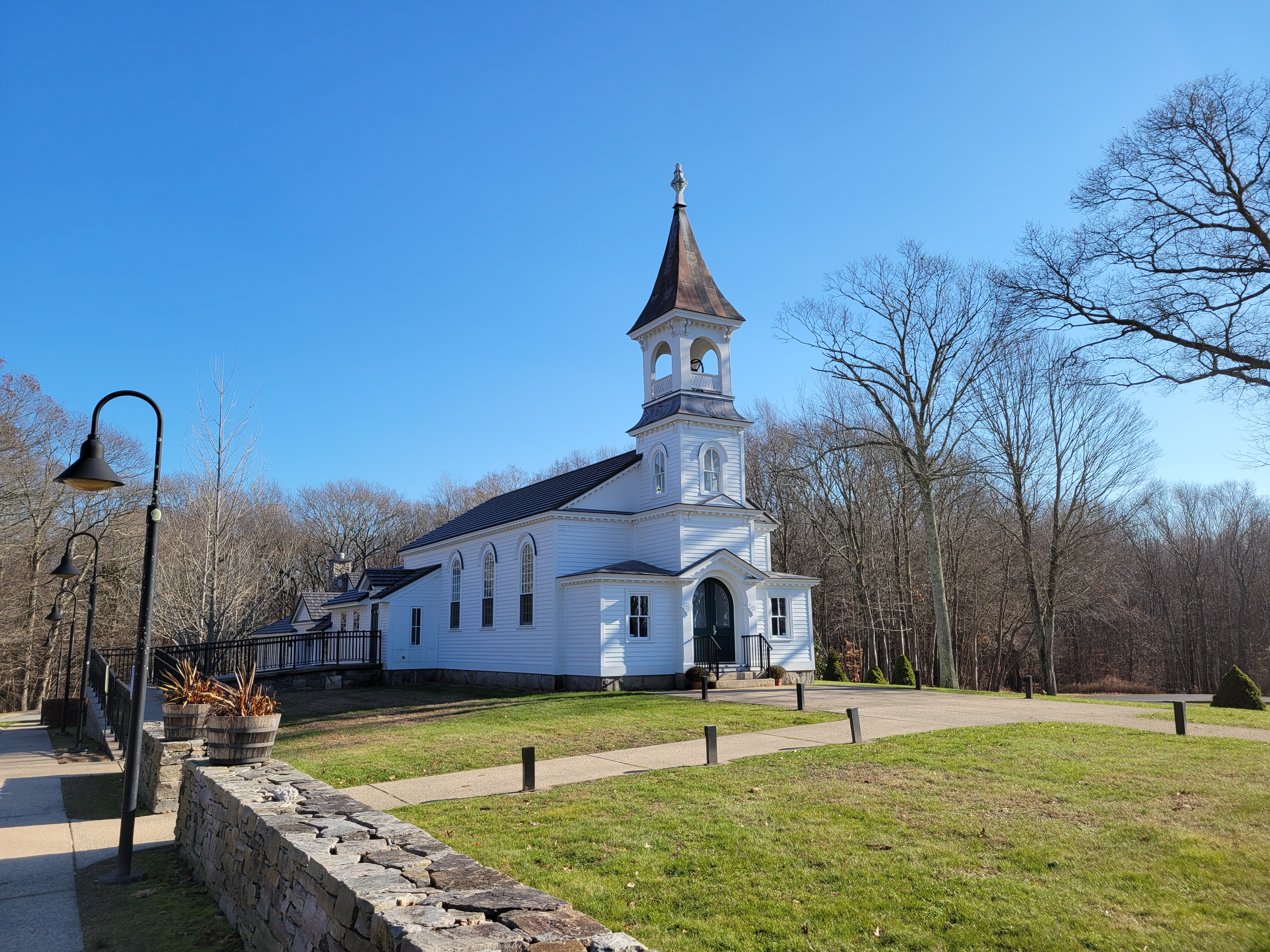
Exterior of the church in Uncasville, CT

The Mohegan Congregational Church, located in Uncasville, Connecticut, is a historic tribal church founded in 1831 by the Mohegan Tribe. It has served not only as a place of worship but also as a center of tribal governance, cultural preservation, and community cohesion. The church is widely considered one of the central reasons the Mohegan people have remained united and visible as a distinct tribal nation into the present day.

== History ==
The Mohegan Congregational Church was established in 1831 by Mohegan tribal members on tribal trust land. Built with their own hands, the church served as a religious institution and a organizing space during a time when Native communities across the United States were being forcibly removed from their homelands.

The church was a direct response to growing pressure on Indigenous lands and sovereignty during the 19th century. Mohegan leaders viewed its establishment as a strategic move to maintain their social structure, land presence, and political identity at a time when these were under significant threat.

Notable Mohegan figures associated with the church include Fidelia Fielding, the last fluent speaker of the Mohegan-Pequot language, and Emma Fielding Baker, a political and cultural leader who used the church as a base for strengthening Mohegan identity through the early 20th century.

== Cultural preservation ==
The Mohegan Church has played a role in preserving tribal identity, especially during periods when external pressures threatened to erode it. While Christian in practice, the church was adapted by Mohegan leaders to serve cultural and political functions as well. It became a site for community rituals, oral storytelling, and traditional practices that helped sustain Mohegan ways of life even under assimilationist policies.

Mohegan women were particularly instrumental in this preservation. Figures like Fidelia Fielding and Gladys Tantaquidgeon carried on traditions through both religious and cultural instruction, using the church as a venue to share oral histories and ensure generational continuity.

== Impact on federal recognition ==
In the 20th century, as the Mohegan Tribe pursued federal recognition, the church played an administrative role. It functioned as the de facto tribal government building and community center, housing meetings that preserved the organizational structure and documentation required by the Bureau of Indian Affairs to prove continuous community and political existence.

Ernest Gilman, a Mohegan elder and key leader in the recognition effort, held regular meetings at the church throughout the mid-1900s. These gatherings helped document "active membership" and "continuous activity," both components of the federal recognition criteria. The meeting minutes and church records from this period were submitted as supporting evidence during the petition process.

When the Mohegan Tribe achieved federal recognition in 1994, the church's unbroken institutional presence was cited as crucial proof that the tribe had never ceased to function as a self-governing community.

== Architecture and preservation ==
The Mohegan Congregational Church is built in a traditional New England Congregational style, with white clapboard siding, a gabled roof, and a central steeple. Though modest in scale, the church is rich in symbolic value as it is a testament to the tribe's resilience and determination to remain rooted in their ancestral lands.

The building has undergone restoration efforts led and funded by the tribe. While regular services are no longer held, the tribe uses it primarily for historic presentations and as an occasional addition to tours offered by the Tantaquidgeon Museum.

== See also ==
- Tantaquidgeon Museum- Mohegan Tribe's Museum; oldest Native American owned and operated museum.
