= Mohegan Tribe =

Federally recognized tribe in Connecticut

Coordinates: 41°29′24″N 72°05′17″W

Mohegan Tribe of Indians of Connecticut Mohiksak
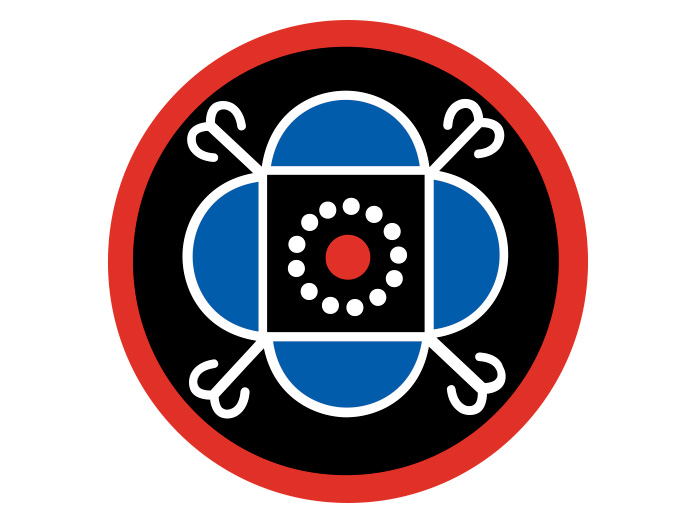
- Official Seal of the Mohegan Tribe
- Motto: "Mundu Wigo" (Mohegan) "The Creator is Good"
- The Mohegan Reservation within Connecticut
- Capital: Uncasville, Connecticut
- Official languages: English; Mohegan
- Demonym: Mohegan
- Government: Elective monarchy
  - Tribal Chief: Marilynn Malerba
  - Tribal Council Chairman: James Gessner
  - Council of Elders Chairman: Laurence Roberge
- Legislature: Mohegan Government
  - Upper house: Tribal Council
  - Lower house: Council of Elders

Independence
  - de facto: September 21, 1638
  - Recognised: March 7, 1994

Area
  - Total: 2.05 km^{2} (0.79 sq mi)

Population
  - 2010 estimate: 1,920
- Currency: United States dollar
- Time zone: ET

The Mohegan Tribe (/ˈmoʊhiːɡæn/ MOH-hee-gan, Mohegan-Pequot: Mohiksak) is a federally recognized tribe and sovereign tribal nation of Mohegan people. Their reservation is the Mohegan Indian Reservation, located on the Thames River in Uncasville, Connecticut.

Mohegan independence as a sovereign nation has been documented by treaties and laws for over 350 years, such as the Treaty of Hartford, secured by their Sachem (Chief) Uncas after his cooperation and victory with the English in the Pequot War (1637–1638). Although the Treaty of Hartford established English recognition of the tribe's sovereignty in 1638, after the colonial period and loss of lands, the tribe struggled to maintain recognition of its identity. Legal proceedings started in 1704.

The tribe reorganized in the late 20th century and filed a federal land claims suit, seeking to regain land that the state of Connecticut had illegally sold. As part of the settlement, the Mohegan Nation gained federal recognition by the United States government in 1994 via the Mohegan Nation (Connecticut) Land Claim Settlement Act. The United States authorized the cleaned-up United Nuclear site for use as Mohegan reservation lands, and the property was transferred to the federal government in trust for the tribe.

Gaining a sovereign reservation enabled the Mohegan to establish gaming operations on their lands to generate revenue for welfare and economic development of their tribe. They opened the Mohegan Sun casino on October 12, 1996, near the former Fort Shantok site above the Thames River. With revenues from the casino, the tribe donates to charitable organizations throughout Connecticut and invests in the development of tribal businesses throughout the United States.

As of 2024, the Mohegan Tribe had an estimated enrolled population of approximately 2,400 members.

== History ==
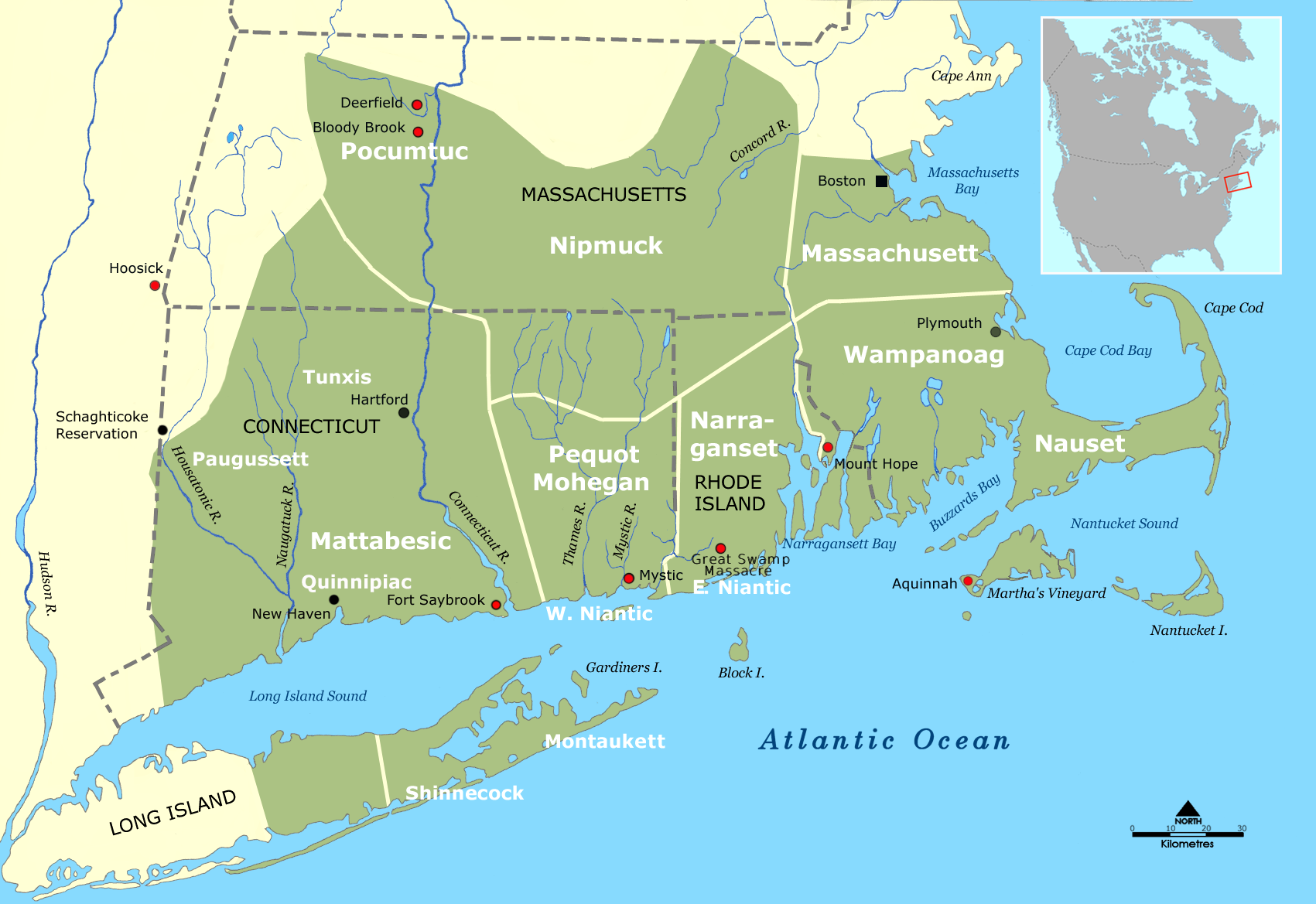
Pre-colonial tribal territories of southern New England, including the Mohegan homeland in present-day Connecticut

=== Origins and split from the Pequot ===
The Mohegan people originated as a branch of the Pequot, both of whom were part of the larger Algonquian-speaking cultural and linguistic group inhabiting southern New England prior to European contact. According to oral traditions and archaeological studies, the Pequot and Mohegan share common ancestral ties to the Lenni Lenape (Delaware) peoples and are believed to have migrated from the Hudson River Valley region into present-day Connecticut during the late prehistoric period.

Before the seventeenth century, Mohegan life revolved around the outdoors, sustaining themselves through farming what is referred to as the Three Sisters: corn, beans, and squash, as well as sunflowers. As needed, they hunted and gathered various game and wild flora. Mohegan language contains many words related to stones. Stones play a dynamic role in Mohegan culture, including, but not limited to, being a tool to connect one to one's ancestors.

=== 17th-century ===
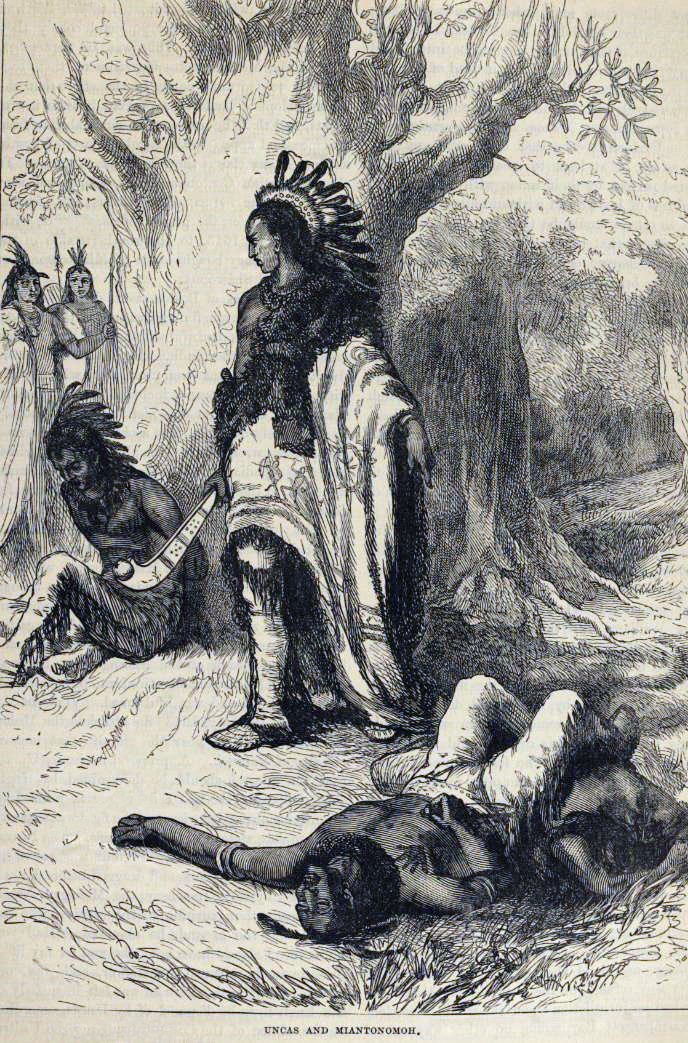
An 1874 illustration of Uncas killing Miantonomoh in 1643

By the early 17th century, tensions within the Pequot led to a major rift between the Sachem Sassacus and the rising leader Uncas (Mohegan-Pequot: Wôks). Uncas advocated for greater cooperation with the newly arrived English settlers, while Sassacus sought to resist colonial encroachment. This ideological divide caused Uncas and his followers to break away and form a new tribal entity, the Mohegan, a name sometimes interpreted as "Wolf People."

The split became permanent following the outbreak of the Pequot War (1637–1638), in which the Mohegan allied with the English and the Narragansett against the Pequot. The Mohegan’s support proved pivotal in the defeat of the Pequot, and in the aftermath, Uncas was recognized by the English as the sachem of the Mohegan under the Treaty of Hartford (1638), which laid the foundation for Mohegan political autonomy.

Following the establishment of the Mohegan as an independent tribe in the wake of the Pequot War, the 17th century was a period of both opportunity and volatility for the Mohegan people. Under the leadership of Uncas, the Mohegan solidified their alliance with the English colonists, positioning themselves as a regional power among southern New England tribes.

Uncas established the Mohegan settlement at Shantok, located along the Thames River (Connecticut), where the tribe defended their territory from rival Indigenous nations, particularly the Narragansett, who launched attacks in retaliation for Mohegan involvement in the Pequot conflict. The resulting tensions led to multiple skirmishes, but the Mohegan retained control of their land through English support and military assistance.

The Mohegan alliance with the English also endured through the outbreak of King Philip's War (1675–1678), one of the most devastating conflicts between Native peoples and English settlers in New England. Unlike many tribes who joined the Wampanoag-led resistance, the Mohegan once again sided with the English. This decision helped the tribe avoid the mass displacement and destruction experienced by many other Indigenous communities.

Despite these alliances, the long-term effects of colonial expansion and war were felt deeply by the Mohegan. Epidemics, land loss, and increased dependency on English trade goods eroded traditional lifeways. Nevertheless, by maintaining a relatively stable relationship with colonial governments, the Mohegan were able to preserve a degree of political autonomy and territorial continuity into the 18th century.

=== 18th–19th century ===
The 18th and 19th centuries were marked by significant land loss and legal uncertainty for the Mohegan Tribe. Despite their alliance with the English during colonial wars, the Mohegan gradually lost control over much of their ancestral territory through a combination of fraudulent land transactions, state encroachment, and shifting colonial policies.

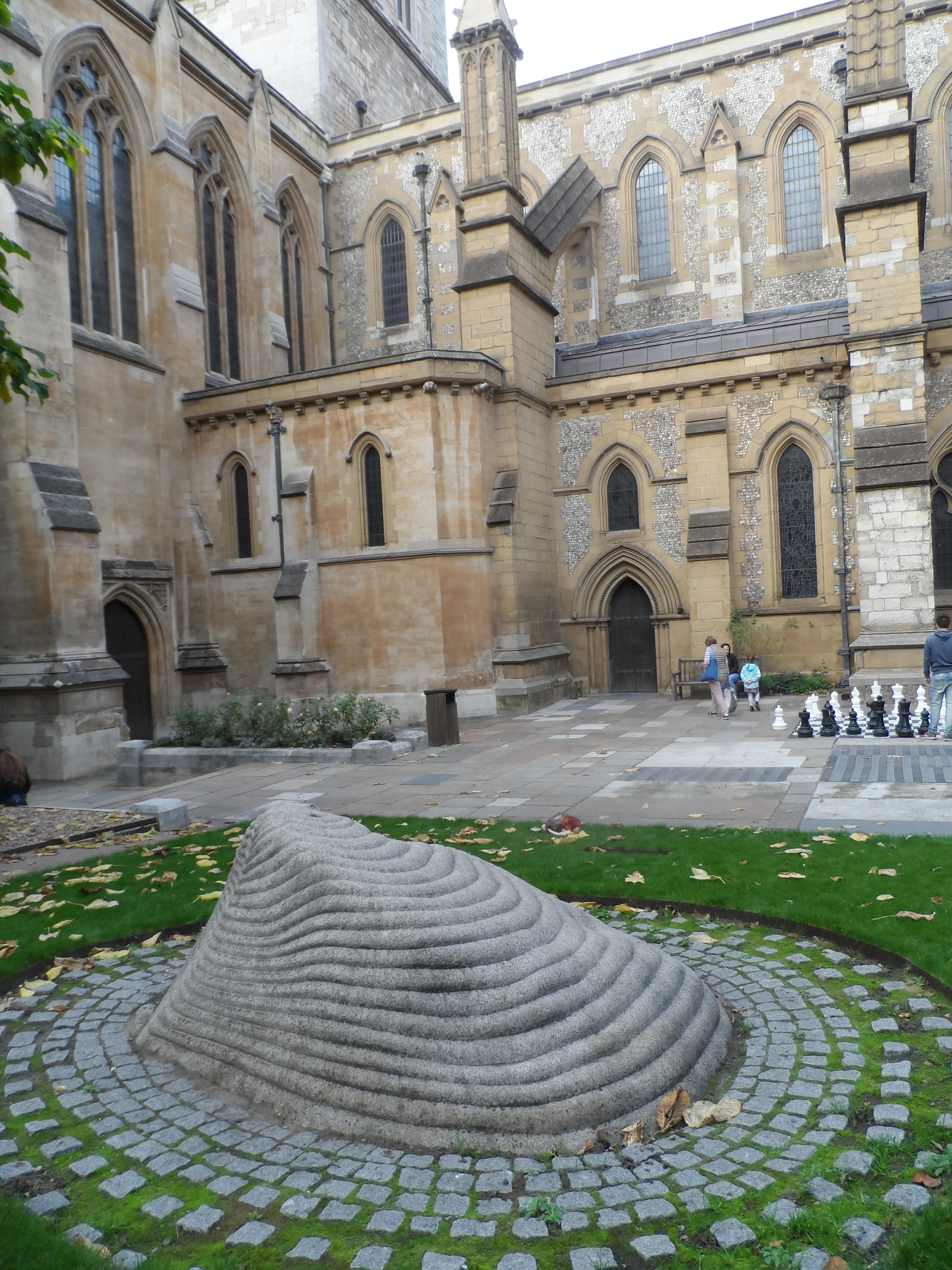
Mahomet Weyonomon's memorial stone at Southwark Cathedral, London.

In 1735, Mohegan sachem Mahomet Weyonomon traveled to England to petition the British Crown for fair treatment and protection of tribal lands. Although he died shortly after his arrival and was buried in Southwark Cathedral, his journey represented an early attempt by the Mohegan to use diplomatic and legal means to defend their sovereignty.

Throughout the 18th century, Connecticut authorities held Mohegan lands in trust, but this arrangement was increasingly violated as non-Native settlers encroached on the territory. The tribe brought its grievances to the British courts in a series of cases known as the "Mohegan Land Controversy," beginning in 1704. Though initially favorable to the tribe, these proceedings were never fully enforced, and by the 19th century, much of Mohegan land had been sold or lost.

Despite these challenges, Mohegan cultural identity persisted. Notably, Fidelia Fielding (1827–1908), the last fluent speaker of the Mohegan-Pequot language, kept personal diaries written in Mohegan that became foundational to later language revitalization efforts. Her writings, preserved and later repatriated by the tribe, would play a central role in reviving the language and reclaiming Mohegan heritage in the 20th and 21st centuries.

=== 20th century ===
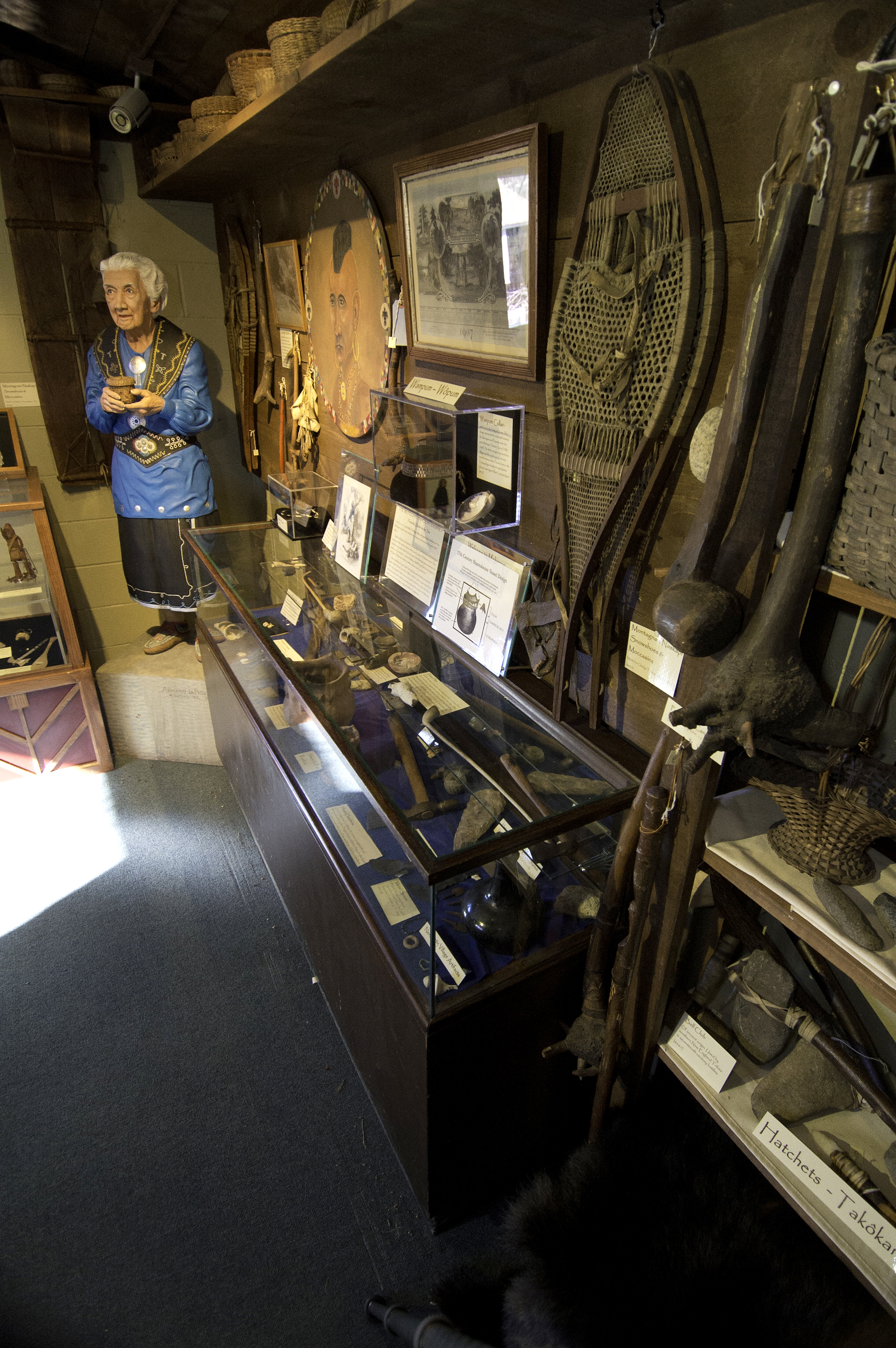
The Mohegan Tribe's museum is the oldest Indian owned and operated museum in America. Gladys Tantaquidgeon along with her brother, Harold and father John, built the museum in 1931 in Uncasville, CT as a place to keep Mohegan treasures.

During the 20th century, the Mohegan Tribe underwent a period of cultural revival and political reorganization, setting the foundation for their eventual federal recognition. After centuries of land loss and state interference, the tribe took steps to formalize its governance and preserve its heritage through grassroots efforts.

A central figure in this movement was Gladys Tantaquidgeon (1899–2005), a Mohegan medicine woman, anthropologist, and public intellectual who played a key role in preserving tribal traditions. Alongside her father and brother, she co-founded the Tantaquidgeon Museum in 1931 in Uncasville, Connecticut. It is the oldest Native American-owned and operated museum in the United States and served as a cultural stronghold for Mohegan history, language, and spirituality during a time of widespread cultural assimilation. Tantaquidgeon's efforts were complemented by the work of her grandniece, Melissa Tantaquidgeon Zobel, who became the tribe’s official historian and worked to preserve Mohegan oral traditions and literature.

In the 1980s, as federal policy became more favorable toward tribal self-governance, the Mohegan Tribe began pursuing federal recognition. To establish a formal political identity, the tribe drafted a written constitution in 1983, outlining its governmental structure, legal powers, and cultural priorities. The Mohegan government was reorganized to include a nine-member Tribal Council and a seven-member Council of Elders, both elected by the tribal community. These bodies assumed responsibility for executive, legislative, and judicial functions, and also oversaw matters of cultural integrity and enrollment. This period of legal and cultural consolidation enabled the Mohegan to prepare for a formal land claim, leading to the landmark recognition settlement of the 1990s.

=== Federal recognition (1994) ===
After decades of legal and political groundwork, the Mohegan Tribe achieved federal recognition on March 7, 1994, through the passage of the Mohegan Nation (Connecticut) Land Claim Settlement Act (Public Law 103–377). This milestone followed years of advocacy aimed at addressing historical injustices related to land dispossession and state interference in tribal affairs.

In 1978, the tribe initiated a federal land claim against the State of Connecticut, alleging that land sold by the state in the 19th century had been transferred without the required approval of the federal government, in violation of the Indian Nonintercourse Act. Negotiations with state and federal officials led to a legislative settlement in the early 1990s, which formally recognized the Mohegan as a sovereign tribe under U.S. law.

As part of the agreement, the federal government took into trust a 240-acre site near Uncasville, Connecticut — previously home to a contaminated United Nuclear facility — and designated it as the official Mohegan Reservation. The site was remediated and transferred to tribal control, giving the Mohegan a land base on which to re-establish economic and political independence.

Federal recognition granted the Mohegan Tribe full access to federal programs and protections under the Bureau of Indian Affairs and affirmed the legitimacy of their tribal government, constitution, and judicial system. The settlement also authorized the tribe to pursue commercial development, leading directly to the establishment of the Mohegan Sun casino two years later in 1996.

== Government ==
The Mohegan Tribe has created and maintained an independent governmental structure since before Europeans arrived in North America. The Mohegan Government has evolved to exercise complete civil and criminal jurisdiction over their lands using the Constitution of the Mohegan Tribe of Indians of Connecticut, which they wrote in the 20th century.

The Mohegan Nation is governed by the Mohegan people. They elect a Tribal Council of nine Tribal Members and a Council of Elders, composed of seven Tribal Members. All legislative and executive powers of the Tribe not granted to the Council of Elders are vested with the Tribal Council. Marilynn Malerba was named the 18th lifetime chief of the Mohegan Tribe on August 15, 2010, and is the first female chief in modern history to hold this position.

The Council of Elders oversees judicial matters and the tribe's cultural integrity. It also exercises legislative powers with respect to rules governing tribal membership and enrollment. The Tribal Court adjudicates on all non-gaming matters. Historically, the tribe has acted as a democratic representative nation. A constitution was drafted in 1983 and has undergone several revisions and amendments since. The Council of Elders upholds and interprets this document.

Following the Congressional passage of the 1988 Indian Gaming Regulatory Act, the Mohegan Nation used its cooperative relationship with the State of Connecticut to negotiate a gaming compact. It gained federal recognition in 1994 and received land in the settlement under the Mohegan Nation (Connecticut) Land Claim Settlement Act (1994). The US took into trust the cleaned-up United Nuclear site for use by the Mohegan as a sovereign reservation. Since 1996, the tribe has slowly been buying pieces of their original land back.

=== Constitution ===
In the Mohegan Constitution, the tribe outlines its goals as:

1) To establish and enforce rules of tribal custom…for the management of tribal society, including but not limited to, the conduct of tribal ceremonies and rituals. (Mohegan Constitution, 1996, Article X, Section 2, h)

(2) To promote and protect the health, peace, morals, and general welfare of the Tribe and its members, and to establish traditional policies regarding the education of tribal members. (Mohegan Constitution, 1996, Article X, Section 2, h).

=== Vision Statement ===
In 1997, the Mohegan Tribe's Council of Elders adopted a vision statement reflecting their identity and roots, stating the tribe’s commitment to ancestry, learning, and the environment. This is reflected in the constitution.

In 1997 the Mohegan Tribe's Council of Elders adopted the following Vision Statement:

We are the Wolf People, children of Mundo, a part of the Tree of Life. Our ancestors
form our roots, our living Tribe is the trunk, our grandchildren are the buds of our future.
We remember and teach the stories of our ancestors.
We watch. We listen. We learn.
We respect Mother Earth, our Elders, and all that comes from Mundo.
We are willing to break arrows of peace to heal old and new wounds. We acknowledge and learn
from our mistakes.
We walk as a single spirit on the Trail of Life. We are guided by thirteen generations
past and responsible to thirteen generations to come.
We survive as a nation guided by the wisdom of our past. Our circular trail returns
us to wholeness as a people.

=== Sovereignty and legal jurisdiction ===
As a federally recognized tribe, the Mohegan Tribe is a sovereign political entity with the inherent authority to govern its internal affairs. This status is affirmed by the United States government through the Mohegan Nation (Connecticut) Land Claim Settlement Act of 1994 and by longstanding principles of tribal sovereignty in the United States.

The Mohegan government exercises civil and criminal jurisdiction within its reservation boundaries in Uncasville, Connecticut, and operates an independent legal system governed by its tribal constitution and laws. The tribe has authority over issues such as law enforcement, taxation, civil regulation, family law, and zoning. In addition, the Mohegan Tribal Court adjudicates legal matters not involving gaming, while gaming oversight is handled separately under federal and tribal regulatory compacts.

The tribe maintains a government-to-government relationship with both the federal government and the State of Connecticut. Under this relationship, the tribe negotiates compacts, consults on regulatory matters, and collaborates on areas such as public safety, health, education, and environmental management.

== Mohegan Reservation ==
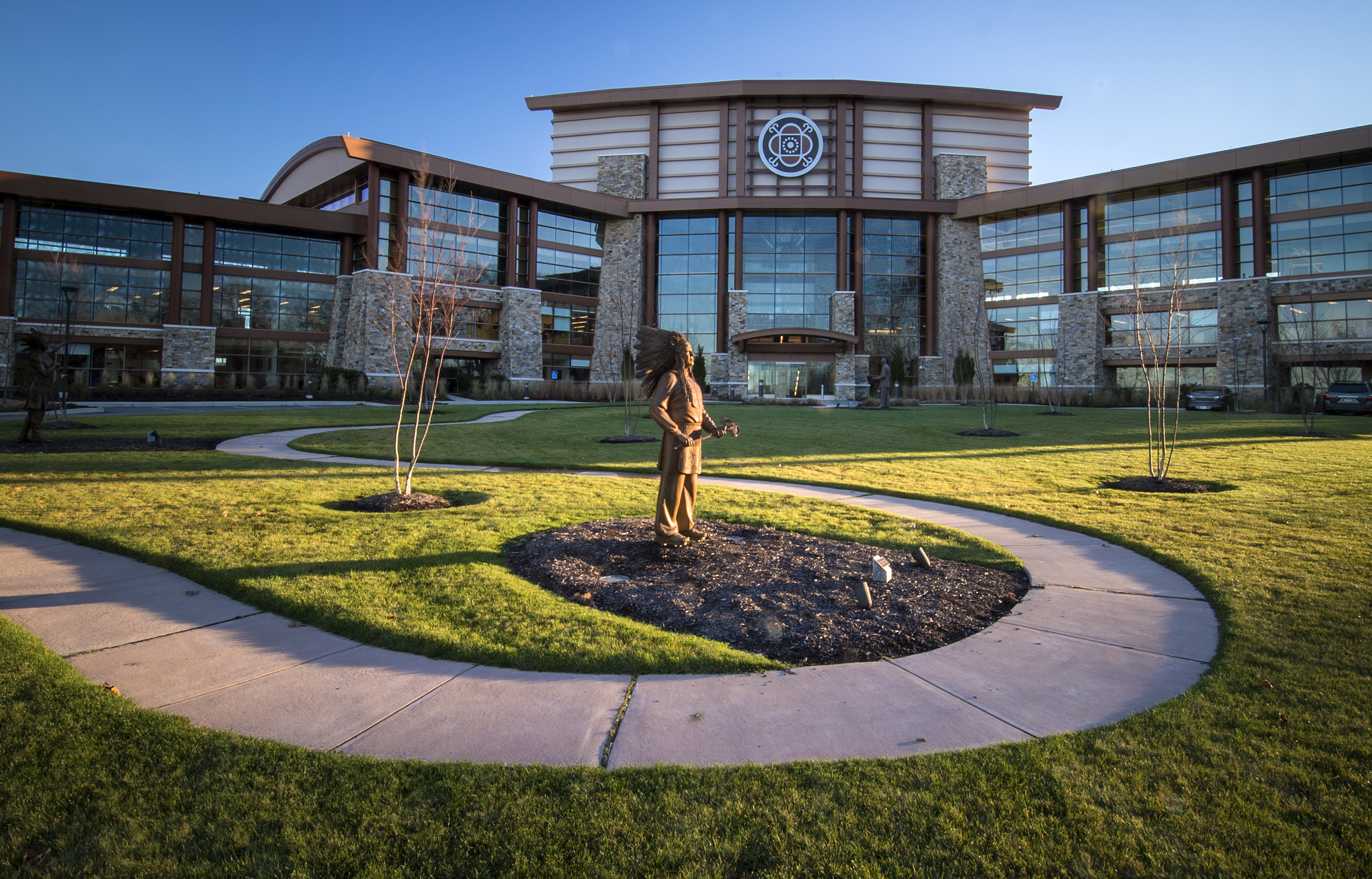
The Mohegan Tribe Community Center and Government Building in Uncasville, Connecticut.

The Mohegan Reservation (Mohegan-Pequot: mohiksuk) is located in Uncasville, a village within the town of Montville, Connecticut, along the eastern bank of the Thames River (Connecticut). The reservation covers approximately 240 acres (0.97 km²) and was formally established as part of the Mohegan Nation (Connecticut) Land Claim Settlement Act in 1994.The land was formerly the site of a contaminated facility operated by the United Nuclear Corporation. As part of the settlement agreement, the site was remediated and transferred into federal trust for the Mohegan Tribe, thereby establishing a sovereign land base for the first time in centuries.

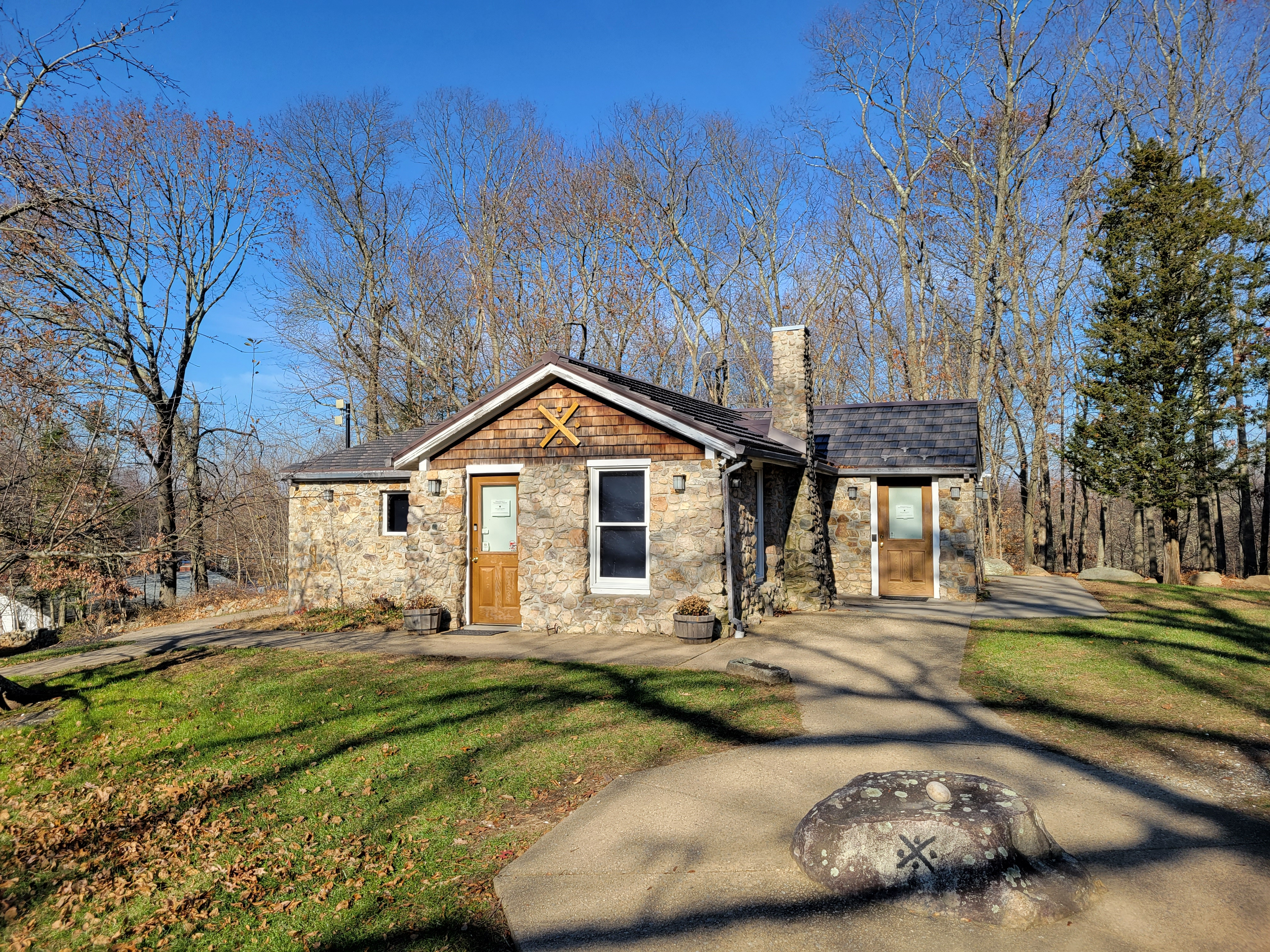
The Tantaquidgeon Museum in Uncasville, Connecticut — the oldest Native American-owned and operated museum in the United States.

The reservation boundaries includes Fort Shantok State Park, site of the principal settlement of the Mohegan people during the 17th century, as well as the Mohegan Congregational Church.

=== Tantaquidgeon Museum ===
The Tantaquidgeon Museum is a central institution in the Mohegan Tribe’s efforts to preserve and promote cultural heritage. Founded in 1931 by Gladys Tantaquidgeon, along with her father John and brother Harold, the museum is located in Uncasville, Connecticut, and is recognized as the oldest Native American-owned and operated museum in the United States. The museum houses a wide-ranging collection of Mohegan artifacts, including stone tools, traditional clothing, ceremonial items, and historical documents.

== Economy ==
The Mohegan Tribe has used gaming to generate revenue for economic development of the Tribe, its members, and the surrounding communities. The Tribe operates its casinos and resorts through Mohegan, previously known as Mohegan Tribal Gaming Authority and then as Mohegan Gaming & Entertainment until May 2022. The organization develops and manages resorts in the United States, Canada, and Northern Asia.

=== Mohegan Sun ===
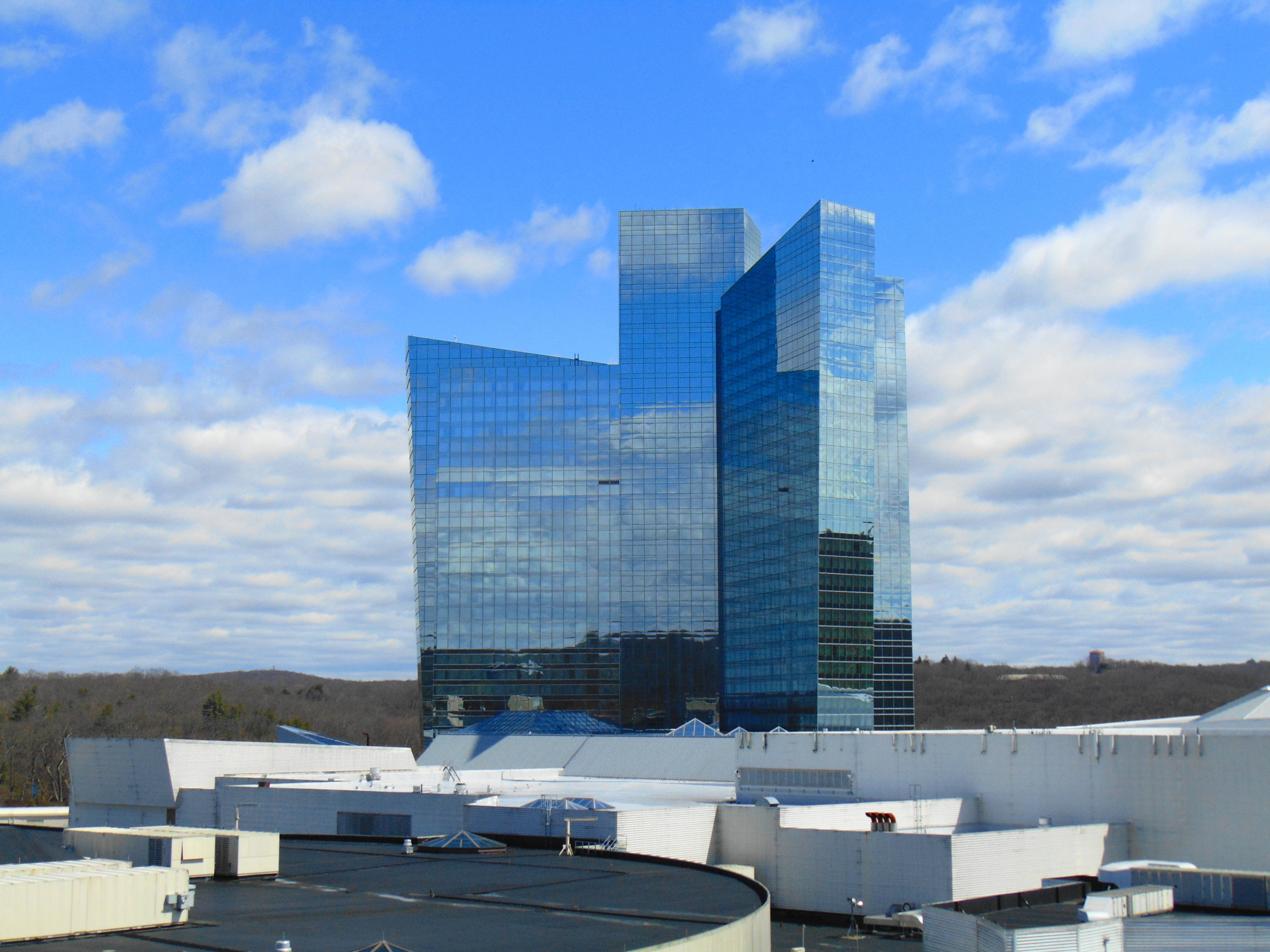
The Sky Tower at Mohegan Sun, the tribe’s flagship casino and resort in Uncasville, Connecticut

The tribe's flagship commercial enterprise is the Mohegan Sun, a casino and entertainment resort located on the Mohegan Reservation in Uncasville, Connecticut. Opened in 1996, Mohegan Sun was established following the 1994 federal recognition of the tribe and a gaming compact negotiated with the State of Connecticut..

Under the compact, the Mohegan Tribe agreed to contribute 25% of slot machine revenue to the state, which has resulted in over $2.5 billion in payments since the casino’s opening. In addition to gaming, Mohegan Sun features hotels, dining, concert venues, sports arenas, and retail space. The resort is one of the largest employers in the region and a major contributor to Connecticut’s tourism economy, directly employing about 10,000 individuals.

As mandated by federal law and the Mohegan Tribe's Constitution and laws, profits from Native American gaming support tribal governments' health, education, welfare, and infrastructure. Although tribes are entitled to certain federal grants, by 1997, the Mohegan Tribe was able to return or reject funds. That year, it turned back $2.2 million in grant funds to the Department of Housing and Urban Development (HUD) for redistribution to other Native American nations.

Since its opening in October 1996, the Mohegan Sun has generated substantial revenues for Connecticut's economy:

- Approximately $2.5 billion in slot revenue contributions to the State of Connecticut
- Over $4 billion is salaries, wages and benefits for employees
- Over $6 billion in goods and services
- Over $200 million in state taxes
- Over $65 million in state services
- Over $18 million in charitable donations

=== Other investments ===
The tribe was a part owner of the New England Black Wolves National Lacrosse League franchise, and is the full owner of the WNBA's Connecticut Sun. It is the first Native American tribe to own a professional sports franchise. In 2021, the WNBA introduced new jerseys to reflect the significant role of female leadership in Mohegan tribal tradition. The tribe designed the jerseys in a collaborative effort involving the Chief, Council of Elders, tribal council, and medicine woman. Each symbol on the jersey was chosen to correspond to a part of tribal history and identity.

A tribe-affiliated company also owns Resorts Casino Hotel in Atlantic City, New Jersey, and Inspire Entertainment Resort located in Incheon, South Korea. Additionally, it is affiliated with other resorts throughout Northern Asia and the United States, including New Jersey, Washington, and Pennsylvania.

In 2018, Mohegan Gaming and Entertainment was awarded the management contract for the Niagara Fallsview Casino Resort and Casino Niagara in Niagara Falls, Ontario under a 21-year contract beginning in June 2019. This marked its first properties in Canada. In September 2019, the company was also awarded a contract to operate the casino at the new Virgin Hotels Las Vegas, located on the former Hard Rock Hotel and Casino site. This made them the first Native American tribe to operate a Las Vegas casino. In May 2024, Mohegan and Virgin Hotels Las Vegas announced the end of their partnership, with the tribe expected to have exited by 2025.

To promote its environmentally friendly philosophy, the tribe invested in a Wood Pellets facility in 2014.

=== Economic self-sufficiency ===
Economic success has enabled the Mohegan Tribe to prioritize self-governance and reduce dependence on federal assistance. In 1997, the tribe voluntarily returned $2.2 million in federal housing grants to the Department of Housing and Urban Development (HUD), citing its ability to fund similar programs independently.

The tribe has also invested in public infrastructure, including building a $35 million access road to the reservation and funding an $11 million regional water project. Additionally, the Mohegan Tribe contributes annually to the Town of Montville in lieu of taxes and supports small business development through the Community Economic Development Fund.

=== Partnership with other tribes ===
The Mohegan Tribe has played a supportive role in the development of economic self-sufficiency for other federally recognized tribes through strategic investments and partnerships. These initiatives reflect a broader commitment to intertribal solidarity and Indigenous empowerment. In 2004, the Mohegan tribe began to use its 1.3 billion dollar revenue to invest in other tribes. They loaned 3.1 million dollars to the Menominee and looked into more deals with other tribes. This promotes a tribe-helping-tribe mentality as revenues from Casinos are used largely to support reservation services.

In 2016, the Mohegan and Tunica-Biloxi Tribe of Louisiana entered into a partnership to remodel the Paragon Casino Resort in Marksville, Louisiana. As of 2021, the Casino is moving towards being debt-free and was able to reinstate employee benefits.

In 2017, the Mohegan Tribe entered into an agreement with the Cowlitz Indian Tribe of Washington to operate the ilani Casino Resort near Ridgefield. The partnership provided startup capital and leveraged Mohegan's experience in casino development and regulation to ensure a successful launch of the Cowlitz’s first major enterprise.

=== Charitable contributions ===
The tribe provides a large source of revenue to the State of Connecticut, paying more than each corporation in the state combined. The Mohegan Tribe used its own funds to pay for the $35 million access road that enables visitors to reach Mohegan Sun without tying up Montville roads. The tribe has worked closely with its neighbors and provided the funding for an $11 million regional water project in order to ensure safe, clean drinking water.

The tribe has been a strong advocate for ensuring that Connecticut's communities get a greater share of slot revenues. It proposed a successful initiative to modify the funding formula so that communities most affected by the casinos receive additional funds from the Pequot-Mohegan Fund.

In addition, the Mohegan Tribe pays the Town of Montville $500,000 each year in lieu of taxes. The Tribe is a partner in the Community Economic Development Fund, a revolving loan program that will help regional small businesses create jobs. The tribe is the first and only non-bank investor in such a program in Connecticut.

In 2012, the Tribe hosted the annual U.S. Sustainable and Responsible Investing conference. As of 2012, they had invested more than any individual government agency in SRI efforts.

The Mohegan Tribe also engages in direct charitable giving and community sponsorships across southeastern Connecticut. Donations have supported hospitals, youth sports leagues, food banks, educational programs, veterans’ organizations, and environmental conservation projects. Through Mohegan Sun and tribal initiatives, the tribe sponsors events such as blood drives, back-to-school supply programs, and fundraising campaigns for cancer research. In 2020, the tribe donated more than 50,000 dollars of food and donated other products to Montville Senior Center, the United Way of Southeastern Connecticut, and Gemma E. Moran United Way/Labor Food Bank in New London. They provided 10,000 grocery bags to a food bank in Connecticut during this time, as well as gloves and masks to local medical professionals.

A member of the Mohegan Tribe sits on the board of trustees for the University of Connecticut.

These intertribal investments are structured to respect the sovereignty of partner tribes while offering shared access to revenue opportunities and institutional knowledge. The Mohegan Tribe views such partnerships as a reflection of traditional Indigenous values of cooperation and mutual support.

=== Sustainability ===
The Mohegan Tribe integrates principles of Socially Responsible Investing (SRI) into its business practices and governance, aligning financial success with environmental ethics and community values. Mohegan has adopted sustainability measures across its enterprises, particularly within Mohegan Sun, which implements energy-efficient technologies, comprehensive recycling programs, and water conservation systems. The resort also partners with local environmental groups on waste management and green infrastructure initiatives.

== Notable Mohegan ==
- Emma Baker (1828–1916), early 20th-century tribal chairwoman who revived the Green Corn Ceremony and worked to preserve Mohegan customs.
- Faith Davison (1940–2019), Mohegan anthropologist and researcher; contributed to the preservation of Mohegan history and culture.
- Fidelia Hoscott Fielding (1827–1908), last fluent speaker of the Mohegan-Pequot language; preserved the language through phonetic diaries now used in revitalization efforts.
- Stephanie Fielding, Mohegan linguist and language revitalization specialist; instrumental in reconstructing the Mohegan-Pequot language using the diaries of Fidelia Fielding.
- Sarah Harris, vice chairwoman of the Mohegan Tribal Council
- Marilynn Malerba (b. 1953), lifetime Chief of the Mohegan Tribe and the first Native American to serve as Treasurer of the United States; advisor to the Secretary of the Treasury on community development and tribal engagement.
- Samson Occom (1723–1792), Presbyterian minister, educator, and diplomat; one of the first Native Americans to publish writings in English and a key figure in the founding of the Brothertown Indian Nation.
- Madeline Sayet (b. 1989), Mohegan theater director, playwright, and educator; known for integrating Mohegan stories and perspectives into contemporary theater.
- Rachel Sayet, Mohegan educator and cultural advocate; works to promote Mohegan traditions and history through public speaking and education.
- Gladys Tantaquidgeon (1899–2005), anthropologist, herbalist, and co-founder of the Tantaquidgeon Museum; known for preserving Mohegan medicine and traditions during the assimilation era.
- Harold Tantaquidgeon (1904–1989), U.S. Navy veteran and co-founder of the Tantaquidgeon Museum; contributed to tribal historic preservation.
- Uncas (c. 1588 – c. 1683), founding sachem of the Mohegan Tribe; established Mohegan independence from the Pequot and formed early alliances with English colonists.
- Mahomet Weyonomon (c. 1700–1736), Mohegan sachem who traveled to England in 1735 to petition the Crown for protection of tribal lands; honored posthumously by Queen Elizabeth II with a memorial stone in Southwark Cathedral.
- Melissa Tantaquidgeon Zobel (b. 1960), Mohegan author, tribal historian, and storyteller; serves as Vice Chairwoman of the Mohegan Council of Elders and is active in cultural and language preservation initiatives.

== See also ==
- Mohegan people
- Mahican – tribe with similar name
- The Last of the Mohicans, historical fiction of a tribe with similar name
