= Tantaquidgeon =

Tantaquidgeon is a Mohegan name and may refer to

== People ==
- Gladys Tantaquidgeon (1899–2005), a Mohegan medicine woman
- Melissa Tantaquidgeon Zobel (born 1960), a Mohegan historian and storyteller

== Other ==
- Tantaquidgeon Museum, the oldest Native American owned and operated museum; located on Mohegan Hill, Uncasville, Connecticut
