= Rachel Sayet =

American educator

Rachel Sayet or Akitusu (Mohegan for 'She Who Reads') is a Mohegan tribal member and Native American educator. Sayet focuses on food sovereignty and the revival of traditional Native foods. Sayet has lectured at historical societies, conferences, high schools and universities, using storytelling and discussions of Native American foods. She states in her many writings that her main goal is to expand awareness of Native New England history and culture.

== Early life ==
Rachel Sayet grew up attending events and festivals centered around Indigenous food. She attended the Green Corn Festival, Succotash Time, and summer powwows around New England. Sayet was the oldest in her family, she also has a younger sister, Madeline Sayet. Being the oldest in her family allowed her to spend more time with her elders alone. During her time with her elders, Sayet would drink tea and tell stories. They would go to the woods to pick flowers and herbs and Sayet would hear stories of giants and little people. These were some of her favorite stories to hear growing up. Sayet's mother, Melissa Tantaquidgeon Zobel, serves as both the Mohegan Medicine Woman and Tribal Historian. Sayet's entire family had a mission of educating people about the history of Native People in New England. Sayet's Uncle Harold once stated, "you can't hate someone you know a lot about."

== Education ==
Rachel Sayet received her Bachelor of Science from Cornell University in Ithaca, New York. She later received her master's degree from Harvard University in anthropology. Sayet's thesis was on stories of a culture hero named Moshup, a giant who is taller than the tallest trees and stays near the ocean catching whales. Moshup married Granny Squannit who was the leader of little people and keeper of plants and medicine, which ties back to the stories she would hear as a girl. Moshup exists both in Mohegan and Wampanoag traditions. Moshup and Granny Squannit represent the balance between male and female and big and small.

== Tantaquidgeon Indian Museum ==
Sayet's aunt, Dr. Gladys Iola Tantaquidgeon, Mohegan Medicine Woman, founded the Tantaquidgeon Indian Museum with her brother in 1931. The museum is located in Uncasville, Connecticut and is now the oldest Native-run museum in the country. Within the museum are Mohegan artifacts, with a room dedicated to artifacts from other tribes across Indian Country. The museum began an initiative to further food sovereignty by including a garden and a greenhouse.

== Work in food sovereignty ==
Sayet started her food sovereignty work in the fall of 2017. In September, she visited the Red Lake Chippewa Nation in Northern Minnesota. During her time there, Sayet participated in their food summit, which was sponsored by the Red Lake Local Foods Initiative. Sayet learned skills to reclaim traditional diets such as seed saving. She visited their fishery that processes local walleye, which is shipped and distributed worldwide. Later in the fall of 2017, Sayet joined a team of Indigenous chefs led by Chef Sean Sherman called Sioux Chef team. The team of chefs hosted a series of pop-up dinners in New York City during the week of Thanksgiving. Each dinner had a regional theme, with the ultimate goal to re-Indigenize Thanksgiving.
