= Sable (disambiguation) =

A sable is a mammal in the mustelid (weasel) family.

Sable may also refer to:

== Animals ==
- American Sable, an ARBA-recognised rabbit breed
- Sable, a dog coat pattern
- Sable, a ferret coat coloring
- Sable antelope, an antelope which inhabits wooded savanna in Africa
- Sablefish or sable, a white fish also known as the butterfish

== Places ==
- Sable Island, an island in Nova Scotia
- Sable (building), a residential tower complex in Jersey City, New Jersey

== People ==
- Avinash Sable, Indian athlete
- Devdatta Sable, Indian music composer
- Jean Baptiste Point du Sable, first permanent non-native settler of Chicago area
- Mark Sable, American writer
- Mia Sable, American actress, voice actress and singer-songwriter
- Sable (wrestler) or Rena Greek, professional wrestler
- Krishnarao Sable also known as Shahir Sable, Indian folk artist

== Fictional characters ==
- Sable (dragon), a dragon in the Dragonlance universe
- Sable, a character from the 2017 film, Dragonheart: Battle for the Heartfire, played by Marte Germaine Christensen
- Sable Able, an Animal Crossing character
- Sable Colby, a character on The Colbys and Dynasty
- Sable Knight, a character from Howard Pyle's novel The Story of King Arthur and his Knights written in 1903
- Sedgewick Sable, a fictional male feline character from the Lackadaisy webcomics
- Silver Sable, a fictional female mercenary from Marvel Comics
- Jon Sable, a fictional mercenary and comic book
- The Prince of Sablé, from Kaeru no Tame ni Kane wa Naru
- Sable Ward, a fictional character from the asymmetrical multiplayer survival horror game Dead by Daylight

== Media ==
- Sable (TV series) (1987–1988), a TV drama
- Sables (film) ("Sands"), French silent film
- Sable (video game), a video game published by Raw Fury
- Sable (EP), 2024 EP by Bon Iver

== Other uses ==
- SABLE, a markup language for speech synthesis developed by Bell Labs
- Sable (heraldry), the colour black in heraldry
- USS Sable (IX-81), a US Navy freshwater aircraft carrier
- Mercury Sable, an automobile model
- Sable, a knife manufactured by Chris Reeve Knives
- Kolinsky sable-hair brush, a type of paintbrush often used for watercolor
- Sable Aviation, a fixed wing aircraft company that flies to Sable Island
- Several entries in the List of grape varieties, including Sable Rouge
- The Zimbabwe national rugby union team, known as the The Sables

== See also ==
- Sablé (disambiguation)
- Sabel (disambiguation)
- Samur (disambiguation) – for interwiki links for transliteration of the translation of "Sable" into Turkish, Bulgarian and Romanian
- Sobol (disambiguation) – for interwiki links for transliteration of the translation of "Sable" into Russian, Polish, and Ukrainian
- Zobel (disambiguation) – for interwiki links for transliteration of the translation of "Sable" into German
