= Sabel =

Sabel may refer to:

- Sabel (TV series), a Philippine soap opera
- Sabel (surname), a Germanic surname
- Sabel (film), a 2004 Philippine film
- Antonette Ruth Sabel (1894-1974), music educator
- Sabel v Puma, a CJEU case

== See also ==
- Sable (disambiguation)
