= Earth Tower =

Hotel in Connecticut, United States

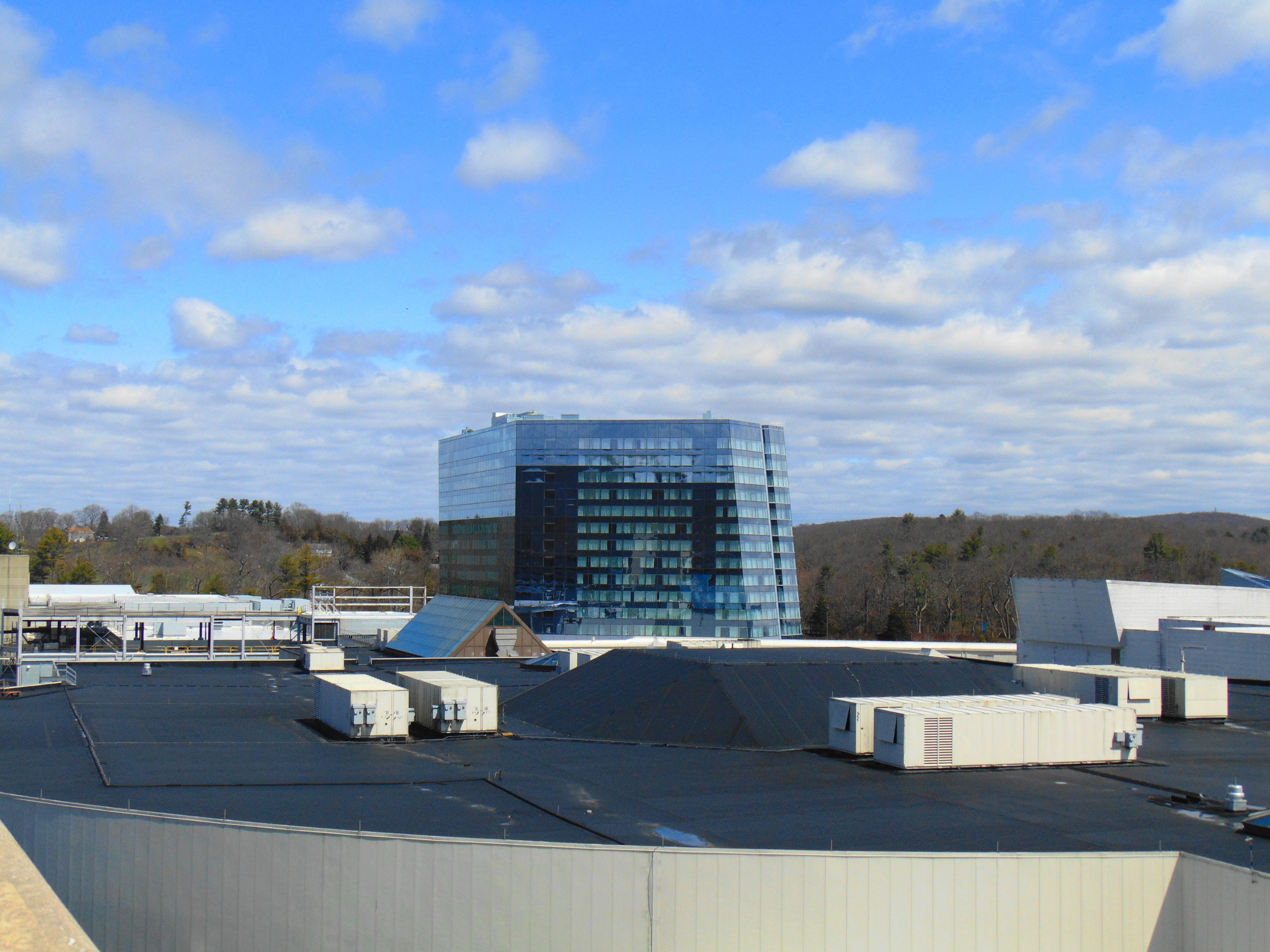
- Interactive map of the Earth Tower area

General information
- Status: Operating
- Type: Hotel
- Location: Uncasville, Connecticut, United States, 1 Mohegan Sun Boulevard
- Coordinates: 41°29′36″N 72°05′26″W
- Groundbreaking: March 2015
- Opened: November 18, 2016
- Owner: Mohegan Indian Tribe

Height
- Height: 156 ft (48 m)

Technical details
- Floor count: 14
- Floor area: 400,000 sq ft (37,000 m^{2})

Design and construction
- Architect: Kohn Pederson Fox

Other information
- Number of rooms: 400
- Number of suites: 39

Website
- mohegansun.com

Earth Tower is a 400-room, 242,000-square-foot (22,500 m^{2}) tower located at the Mohegan Sun Casino in Uncasville, Connecticut.

== History ==
In 1995, Mohegan Sun asked Kohn Pedersen Fox, an architectural firm, to design a new hotel based on the 1,200-room Sky Tower, which was also designed by the firm. The project was held off until 2008, when Mohegan Sun publicly announced plans to build the hotel, however the Great Recession further delayed construction. The groundbreaking finally took place in March 2015 with A/Z Corporation hired to construct the tower. The Earth Tower was opened on November 18, 2016.

== Features ==
The tower has a pool, a spa, and a fitness center. There are gas fire pits outside. Earth Tower has 400 rooms, with 39 suites. Earth Tower is connected to the Casino of the Earth, and is therefore connected to all the casinos of Mohegan Sun. There is also a hallway that connects the Earth Tower to the Sky Tower lobby. Bean and Vine Cafe & Wine Bar is a full-service coffee and wine bar, which is the only dining option located in the Earth Tower.

== See also ==
- Foxwoods Resort Casino, the other casino in Connecticut
