= Zobel =

Zobel may refer to:

- Zobel, a mountain range in the Ethiopian district of Kobo
- Zobel (surname), including a list of people with the name
- Zobel network constant resistance networks invented by Otto Zobel
- Zobel Building, a building in downtown Los Angeles
- Zóbel de Ayala family of the Philippines
- A nickname of the De La Salle-Santiago Zobel School in Muntinlupa, Philippines, named after a member of the Zobel de Ayala family.
- The German name for sable
- The German Zobel-class fast attack craft
