= Emma Fielding Baker =

Leader of the Mohegan Pequots (1828–1916)

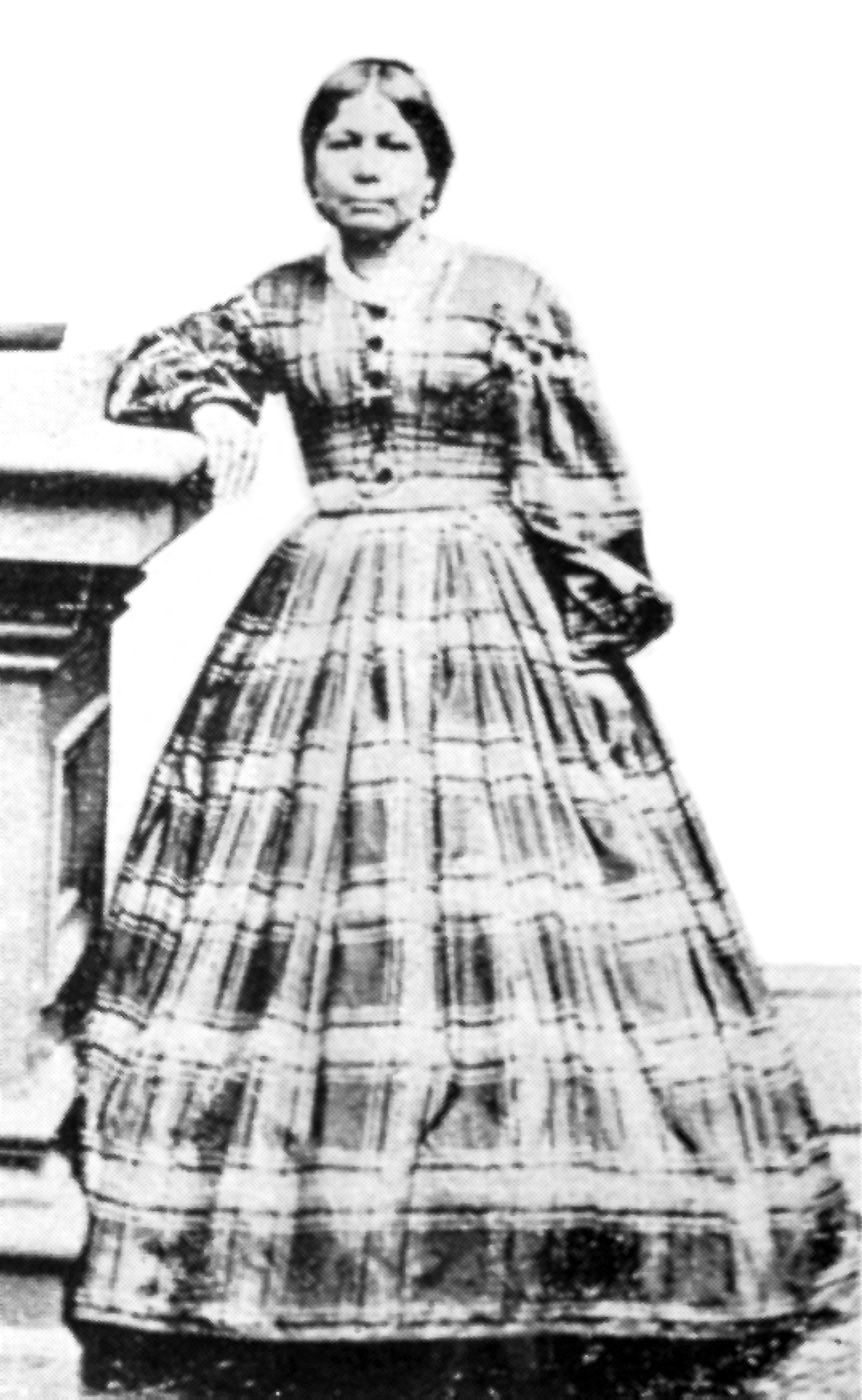
- Born: Emma Fielding Baker; December 5, 1828; Mohegan (now Fort Shantok, Montville, Connecticut)
- Died: January 20, 1916 (aged 87)
- Occupations: Tribal historian, medicine woman (posthumous)

Emma Tyler Fielding Baker December 5, 1828 – January 20, 1916) was a member of the Mohegan Pequot Indian tribe and was posthumously awarded the title of Mohegan medicine woman in 1992. Medicine women were culture-bearers and required to have an in-depth knowledge of tribal customs and possess good leadership qualities. She was also a tribal historian and ceremonial leader of the Mohegan Tribe.

== Early life and family ==
Baker was born in the village of Mohegan (now Fort Shantok, Montville, Conn.) on December 5, 1828, to Francis Fielding and Rachel Commenwas Hoscott and was one of ten children. As an adult, Baker helped preserve tribal historical records and oral traditions thus becoming known as a culture-bearer. Baker married a Mohegan man named Henry Greenwood Baker on November 30, 1854, who became the father of her eight children.

== Leadership within the tribe ==
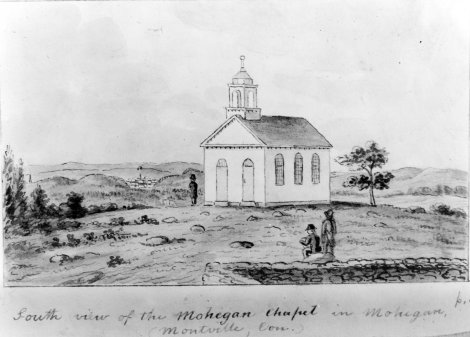
South View of Mohegan Chapel, in Montville, Conn. "South View of Mohegan Chapel, Monhegan" in Montville, a sketch by John Warner Barber for his Historical Collections of Connecticut (1836). According to the Connecticut Historical Society, the chapel was constructed in 1831 with funds from the "benevolent ladies in Norwich, Hartford, and New London" as a church for Mohegan and white residents of the reservation in Montville." (Source: Montville, Connecticut Wiki Page)

In 1860, Baker served as the president of the Church Ladies Sewing Society which was considered to be an auxiliary of the Mohegan Church. This group of women worked to preserve Mohegan culture and, as part of their matriarchal role within the tribe, considered new chiefs and decided land claims. This group met regularly at the Mohegan Church in Montville, Conn. One of Baker's actions as president was to restore an ancient Mohegan Green Corn Festival nicknamed the "Wigwam Festival" ("wigwam" meaning "welcome"). This Festival continues into the present as a celebration of Mohegan tribal culture and is annually held during the third weekend in August. Because the Mohegan Green Corn Festival was to be held on the grounds of the Mohegan Congregational Church (whose land was tribally owned), this provided solidarity for the tribe in the following years when the reservation land was eventually broken up. Baker also served as a Sunday School teacher at the Mohegan Church.

Baker was elected president of the Mohegan Indian League in 1896. She represented the Mohegan Nation before the all-white, all-male Connecticut legislature as part of an endeavor to protect Mohegan land and sacred sites. She also chaired the Mohegan tribal council. and documented the desecration of the Norwich Royal Mohegan Burial Ground. Baker also lent some "Indian Relics" to the Converse Art Gallery in Norwich, Conn., for display in honor of the anniversary of the town on Saturday, July 3, 1909; this display was curated by the Daughters of the American Revolution. Long after her death, she was posthumously elected as a member of the Connecticut Women's Hall of Fame in 1994.

== Later life and legacy ==
Baker was a "nanu" (mentor or respected elder woman) to her niece Gladys Tantaquidgeon, by instructing her in tribal spirituality and herbal medicine which Baker had learned from Martha Uncas, her grand-aunt.

Baker died on January 20, 1916, and is buried at Shantok Burial Grounds in Uncasville, Connecticut. Baker was immortalized in 2017 by artist Adam Chambers when he created her portrait for one of eleven ornaments to decorate one of the 56 trees representing each U.S. state and territory at the President's Park in Washington, D.C. She was selected because she is considered a Connecticut native who dedicated her life to promote tolerance and diversity.

Ralph W. Sturges (1918–2007), Baker's great-grandson, was instrumental in assisting the Mohegan Tribe achieve construction of the Mohegan Sun Casino on 240 acres of the Tribe's reservation land in Uncasville, Conn. The casino opened October 12, 1996, eighty years after Baker's death. With proceeds from this casino, the Mohegan Tribe was able to contribute $10 million to the Smithsonian Institution toward building the National Museum of the American Indian.

== Gallery ==
Images of Fielding Baker
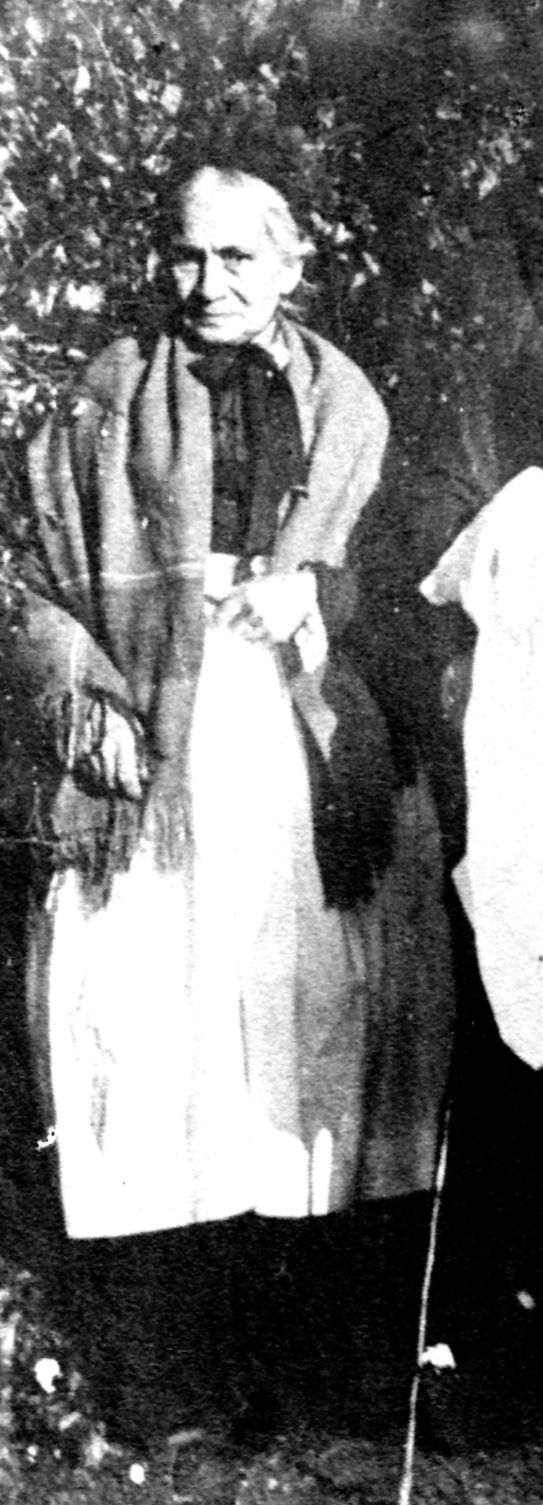

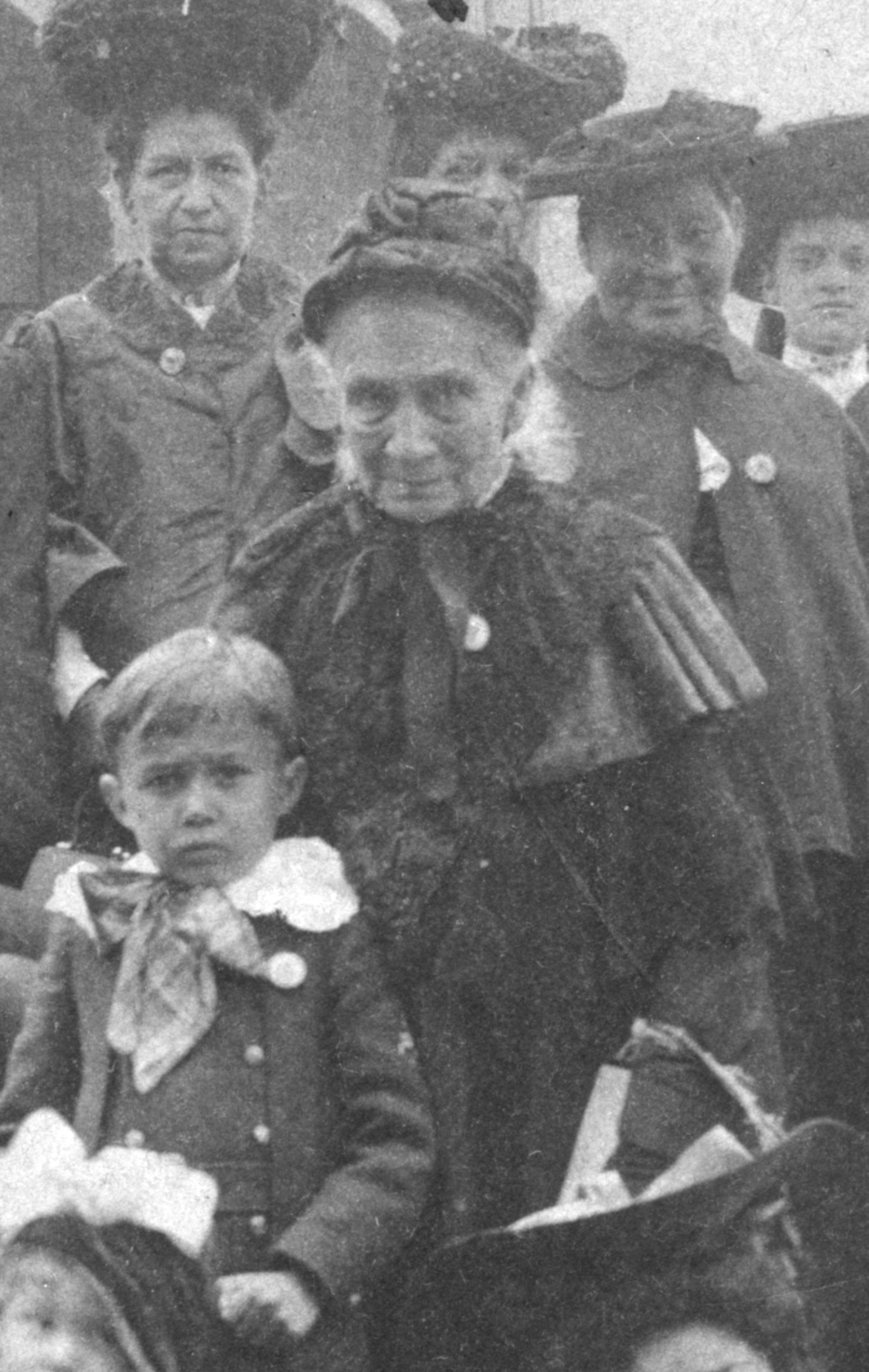

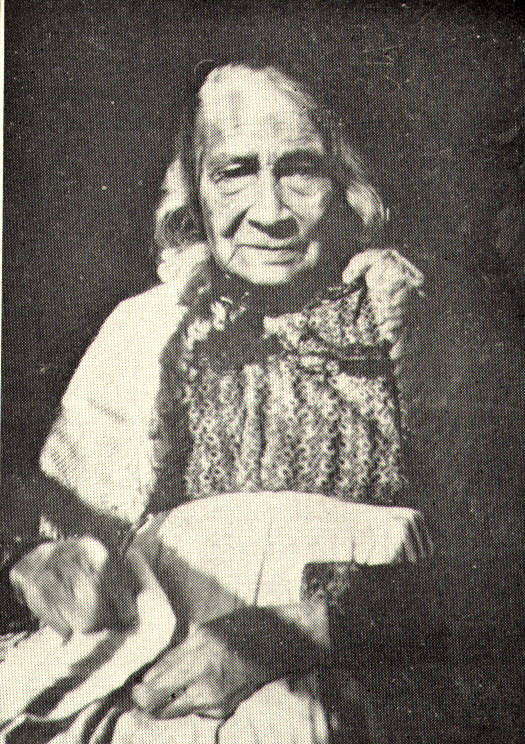

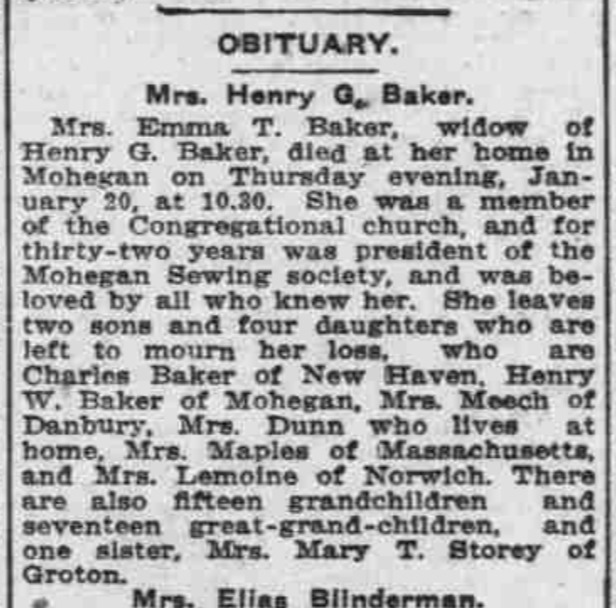
Obituary of Emma Tyler Fielding Baker (Mrs. Henry G. Baker) from the "Norwich Bulletin," January 24, 1916.

== See also ==
- List of Native American politicians
- Native American women in politics
