= Fidelia Fielding =

Last-known speaker of the traditional Mohegan Pequot language

Fidelia Hoscott Fielding
- Cits Pátunáhshô
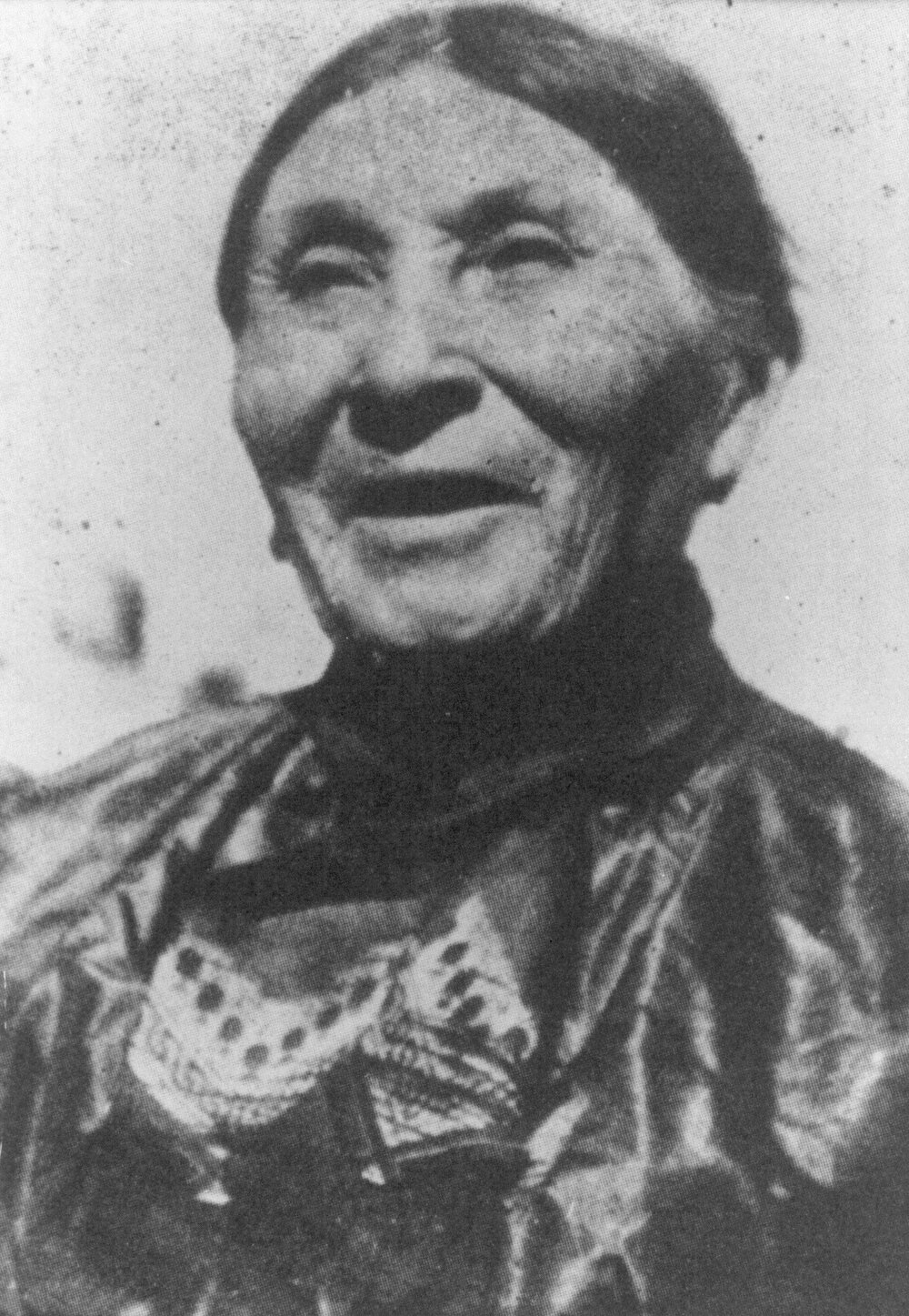
- Born: Fidelia Ann Hoscott Smith; September 15, 1827; Montville, New London County, Connecticut, U.S.
- Died: July 18, 1908 (aged 80); Montville, New London County, Connecticut, U.S.
- Resting place: Fort Shantok State Park, Montville, New London County, Connecticut, U.S.
- Known for: Last speaker of Mohegan-Pequot language
- Spouse: William H. Fielding (born 1822–died 1889)
- Parent(s): Bartholomew Valentine Smith (c. 1811–1843) and Sarah A. Wyyougs (1804–1868)
- Relatives: Stephanie Fielding

Fidelia Ann Hoscott Fielding (née Smith; September 15, 1827 – July 18, 1908), also known as Cits Pátunáhshô ("Flying Bird"), was the last-known speaker of the traditional Mohegan Pequot language. She was a daughter of Bartholomew Valentine Smith (c. 1811 – 1843) and Sarah A. Wyyougs (1804–1868), and granddaughter of Martha Shantup Uncas (1761–1859),

She married a Mohegan mariner, William H. Fielding (born 1822–died 1889). They lived in one of the last "tribe houses," a reservation-era log cabin dwelling. She was known to be an independent-minded woman who was well-versed in tribal traditions, and who continued to speak the traditional Mohegan Pequot language during her elder years.

== Mohegan language ==
Fielding insisted upon retaining the everyday use of the Mohegan language during an era when most New England Native peoples were becoming increasingly fluent in English. Her maternal grandmother Martha Uncas spoke it with family members, and other Mohegan people continued to speak and understand some of the language, but by 1900, few were as fluent as Fidelia and her sister. As an adult, Fielding kept four diaries in the language, which later became vital sources for reconstructing the syntax of Mohegan Pequot and related Algonquian languages.

Fielding was regarded as a nanu (respected elder woman) and mentor to Gladys Tantaquidgeon, a traditional Mohegan woman who also studied anthropology at the University of Pennsylvania and served as a research assistant to Frank Speck. Tantaquidgeon conducted field work and service work for a variety of Native communities and agencies before coming home to Uncasville. In Uncasville, Gladys and her family founded the Tantaquidgeon Indian Museum, and she became a respected elder herself, working on material and cultural preservation.

Many modern sources suggest that anthropologist Frank G. Speck, as a child, lived with Fidelia Fielding, but there is no evidence to support that in any Mohegan tribal records or oral memories. Speck recalled, in his own publications and correspondence, that he first met Fielding around 1900, when he was an anthropology student at Columbia University. Speck was in the midst of a camping trip to Fort Shantok, Connecticut, when he met up with several Mohegan young men—Burrill Tantaquidgeon, Jerome Roscoe Skeesucks, and Edwin Fowler—who introduced him to Fielding. This encounter sparked a lifelong friendship with the Tantaquidgeon family. Speck interviewed Fielding, recording notes on the Mohegan language that he shared with his professor, John Dyneley Prince, who encouraged further research. Fielding eventually allowed Speck to view her personal daybooks (also called diaries) in which she recorded brief observations on the weather and local events, so that he could understand and accurately record the written version of the Mohegan language.

This material that Speck collected from Fielding inspired four publications in 1903 alone: “The Remnants of our Eastern Indian Tribes” in The American Inventor, Vol. 10, pp. 266–268; “A Mohegan-Pequot Witchcraft Tale” in Journal of American Folklore, Vol. 16, pp. 104–107; “The Last of the Mohegans” in The Papoose Vol. 1, No. 4, pp. 2–5; and “Mohegan Traditions of ‘Muhkeahweesug,’ the Little Men” in The Papoose No . 7, pp. 11–14. Speck also co-authored a 1904 article with J. Dyneley Prince, “The Modem Pequots and their Language” in American Anthropologist, n. s., Vol. V pp. 193–212.

In 1908, after Fielding's death, a relative, John Cooper, gave her diaries to Frank Speck for safekeeping. Speck later deposited them in George Gustav Heye's Heye Foundation/Museum of the American Indian in New York City. These documents were later relocated, as part of the Huntington collection, to the Division of Rare and Manuscript Collections at Cornell University before being repatriated to the Mohegan Tribe's archive collection on November 4, 2020, where they currently reside.

== Legacy and honors ==
Fidelia Fielding died on July 18, 1908, in Montville, Connecticut, and was buried at the Ancient Burial Grounds of the Mohegans at Fort Shantok State Park in Montville, Connecticut. A memorial marker was placed there to honor her, at a ceremony with an estimated 1,000 people in attendance on May 24, 1936.

Credited with being an instrumental influence in recording and preserving the language, in 1994 she was posthumously inducted into the Connecticut Women's Hall of Fame under the category Education & Preservation. Fielding is one of only three American Indians who have been inducted into the Connecticut Women's Hall of Fame. Years later, Gladys Tantaquidgeon, a Mohegan woman trained by Fielding who similarly insisted on preserving traditional ways, was also inducted into the Hall of Fame.

During Fielding's lifetime, parents were reluctant to use or teach the Mohegan language to their children, for fear of prejudice or reprisals from the English speakers around them. In the present day, linguists from the Mohegan Language Project, including Stephanie Fielding (a descendant), have been carefully working with materials compiled and archived by Fielding and Speck in order to reconstruct and reanimate Mohegan-Pequot as a living language for new generations.
