= Zobel (surname) =

Zobel (German pronunciation: [ˈtsoːbl]) is a German family name. It may occasionally appear as Zóbel (Spanish pronunciation: [ˈsoβel]) in Spanish-language texts.

== Notable people ==
- Benjamin Zobel, German painter
- Claudia Zobel, Filipino actress
- Craig Zobel, American film director and co-creator of Homestar Runner
- Enrique J. Zóbel, Filipino businessman
- Fernando Zóbel de Ayala, Filipino businessman
- Fernando Zóbel, Spanish Filipino artist
- Friedrich Zobel, Austrian military officer
- Hermann Zobel, Danish equestrian
- Hiller B. Zobel, US judge and author
- Jaime Augusto Zóbel de Ayala, Filipino businessman
- Jaime Zóbel, Filipino businessman
- Jan Zobel, American accountant, community organizer
- Joel Reyes Zobel, (Filipino) GMA Network's DZBB-AM radio commentator (not related to the Zobel de Ayala family)
- Joseph Zobel, Martinican author
- Marita Zóbel, Filipino actress
- Marius Zobel, German swimmer
- María Vallejo-Nágera Zobel, Spanish novelist
- Marita Zobel (born 1941), Filipino actress
- Martin Zobel, Estonian plant ecologist
- Melchior Zobel von Giebelstadt, 16th century bishop
- Melissa Tantaquidgeon Zobel, US historian
- Otto Julius Zobel, early 20th century electrical filter inventor and researcher
- Peter Zobel, Danish businessman and equestrian
- Rainer Zobel, former German football (soccer) player and current coach
- Richard Zobel, US actor
- Rya Zobel, federal judge on the U.S. District Court for the District of Massachusetts
- Vanessa-Kim Zobel (born 1988), German politician
