= Sablé =

Sablé may refer to:

- Sablé (biscuit), a shortbread cookie
- Sablé-sur-Sarthe, France
  - Sablé FC (France), French football club
- Julien Sablé (born 1980), French footballer
- Robert de Sablé, multiple people
- Victor Sablé (1911–1997), French politician
