= Madeline Sayet =

American director and writer (born 1989)

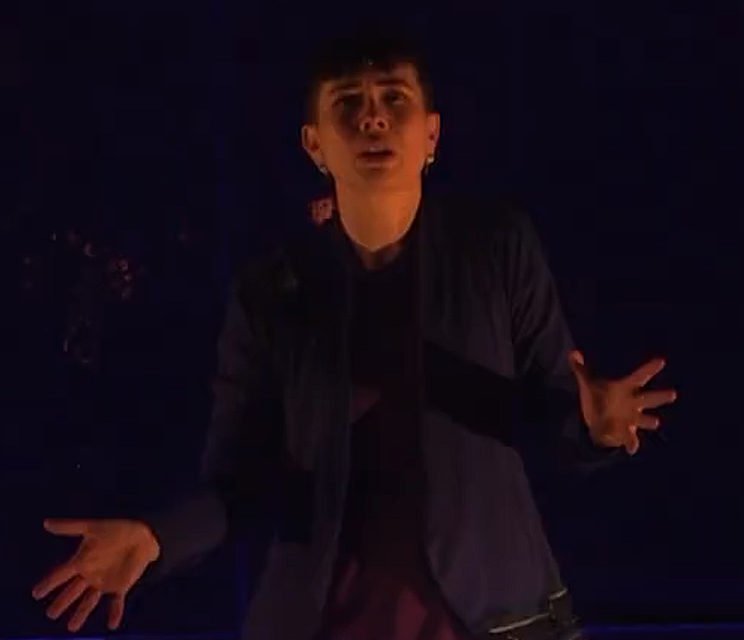
- Born: July 1, 1989 (age 37)
- Relatives: Gladys Tantaquidgeon, Melissa Tantaquidgeon Zobel

Madeline Sayet (born July 1, 1989) is a Native American (Mohegan) director and writer. She grew up in Norwich and Uncasville, Connecticut.

== Early life and education ==
Sayet was brought up on stories and traditions of the Mohegan tribe from her great-aunt Gladys Tantaquidgeon, former Medicine Woman, and her mother, Melissa Tantaquidgeon Zobel (née Melissa Jayne Fawcett), current Medicine Woman. Sayet holds ancestral ties to Fidelia Fielding who was the last fluent speaker of the Mohegan language, and died in 1908. These ties serve as an influence for much of her work.

From an early age, oral traditions and storytelling all played a major role in her work. In high school, Sayet took part at the Eugene O'Neill Theatre Center's National Puppetry Conference. Post graduation, she went on to study under the Atlantic Theater Company at New York University as part of the Tisch School of the Arts. After receiving her BFA in Theater, she continued her studies as part of the graduate program, where she received her MA in Arts Politics and Post-Colonial Theory, at NYU's Gallatin School of Individualized Study. During this time, she co-founded and directed the Mad & Merry Theatre Company. Sayet adapted classical pieces to incorporate her own culture. She also has an MA in Shakespeare from The Shakespeare Institute in Stratford Upon Avon, UK.

== Career ==
Madeline Sayet is currently the executive director of the Yale Indigenous Performing Arts Program. In 2018, she was named a Forbes 30 Under 30 in Hollywood & Entertainment for her work as a stage director, reimagining the classics. Early in Sayet's directing and writing career, she remade the Shakespeare classic "The Tempest" by incorporating Mohegan language and culture. This production served as her graduate thesis at New York University and was brought onstage at the Brooklyn Lyceum. While at NYU, Sayet launched The Mad and Merry Theatre Company, which completed three successful seasons of programming dedicated to reimagining classic stories before disbanding. During this time Sayet wrote "Daughters of Leda," a play that chronicles the stories of well-known mythological characters such as: Leda and The Swan, Adam and Eve, Helen, Clytemnestra, Iphigenia, and Electra from the female perspective, which was produced as part of the Women Center Stage Festival, the Dream Up Festival, and Dixon Place's Works-In-Progress. She is the recipient of the White House Champion of Change Award for Native America for her work as a director, writer, performer and educator.

In 2015 Sayet made her opera debut when she directed a new production of The Magic Flute for the Glimmerglass Opera,. In 2015 she also launched the Native Shakespeare Ensemble at American Indian Artists, Inc. (Amerinda) with productions of Macbeth and The Winter's Tale. Sayet also directed "Sliver of a Full Moon" by Mary Kathryn Nagle, which is a play about the Violence Against Women Act (VAWA) that pays tribute to the re-authorization that occurred in 2013. It aims to get the audience to see Native women that were affected by violence to be seen as human beings rather than symbols.

In Mohegan, her job is called "Kutayun Uyasunaquock" which means "Our Heart She Leads Us There." She is currently a TED Fellow, MIT Media Lab Director's Fellow, and National Directing Fellow. In 2021, she served as the transitional Co-Artistic Director of Red Eagle Soaring: Native Youth Theatre. She served as the Resident Artistic Director at Amerinda from 2013 to 2016, the artistic director of the Mad & Merry Theatre Company from 2011 to 2014, and has been a Van Lier Directing Fellow at Second Stage Theatre, and a Creative Community Fellow at National Arts Strategies'.

In 2019, she performed her solo performance piece "Where We Belong," at Shakespeare's Globe in London, making her the first Native American playwright to have her work performed in that space. "Where We Belong" was then produced as a film adaptation by Woolly Mammoth Theatre Company, in association with the Folger Shakespeare Library in 2021, followed by a national tour of the production, directed by Mei Ann Teo. For the Chicago run of Where We Belong at The Goodman Theatre, Sayet was nominated for the Jeff Award for Best Solo Performance.

== Awards ==
- Forbes 30 Under 30: Hollywood & Entertainment
- TED Fellow
- MIT Media Lab Director's Fellow
- National Directors Fellowship
- Leo Bronstein Homage Award— New York University
- White House Champion of Change Award for Native America

== Works ==
=== Directing ===
- Whale Song, by Cathy Tagnak Rexford
- L'incoronazione di Poppea, by Claudio Monteverdi
- The Winter's Tale, by William Shakespeare
- The Magic Flute, by Wolfgang Amadeus Mozart/Emanuel Schikaneder, English translation by Kelley Rourke
- Powwow Highway, by William S. Yellow Robe, Jr.
- Miss Lead, by Mary Kathryn Nagle
- Uncommon Women and Others, by Wendy Wasserstein
- The Tempest, by Shakespeare

=== Writing ===
- Antigone or And Still She Must Rise Up
- Where We Belong
- Up and Down the River
- Daughters of Leda
- Who Flies Apart
- The Pants
- "When The Whipporwill Calls" in Dawnland Voices: Writing from Indigenous New England
