= Sabel (surname) =

Sabel is a surname commonly found in Scandinavia, and is most densely found in Sweden. This surname is of Germanic and Jewish origin. There are many variants of this surname such as the English surname Sabell, the German surname Seibel, or even the Polish form Szajbel. Notable persons with the surname include:

- Anton Sabel (1902-1983), German politician
- Charles Sabel (born 1947), professor of law and social science at Columbia Law School
- Erik Sabel (born 1974), American baseball player
- Oliver Sabel, a character in the German soap opera Verbotene Liebe

== See also ==
- Sable (disambiguation)
