= Robert de Sablé =

Robert de Sablé can refer to:

- Robert I de Sablé (1035–1098), seigneur de Craon, father of Robert II de Sablé
- Robert II de Sablé (1065–1110), seigneur de Sablé, grandfather of Robert III de Sablé
- Robert III de Sablé (1122–1152), seigneur de Sablé, father of Robert IV de Sablé
- Robert IV de Sablé (1150–1193), Grand Master of the Knights Templar
