= Stephanie Fielding =

Mohegan linguist

- Yôpôwi Yoht
- Born: Stephanie Mugford Fielding
- Other name: Morning Fire
- Citizenship: Mohegan, American
- Education: Massachusetts Institute of Technology (MS); University of Connecticut (BA)
- Occupations: Linguist, teacher, writer, editor, graphic artist, radio announcer
- Known for: Reconstruction of the Mohegan language
- Notable work: A Modern Mohegan Dictionary (2006)
- Board member of: Norwich Community Development Corp.; Endangered Language Fund
- Relatives: Fidelia Fielding (Great-great-great-aunt)

Stephanie "Morning Fire" Fielding (Mohegan: Yôpôwi Yoht) is a Mohegan linguist. Her work focuses on the resurrection and revitalization of the Mohegan language. During the 2017-2018 academic year, she was a Presidential Fellow and lecturer in the Department of Linguistics at Yale University. Fielding lives on the Mohegan reservation in southeastern Connecticut, in Uncasville. She is a member of the Baha'i faith.

== Biography and career ==
Fielding holds a Bachelor of Arts in linguistics and anthropology from the University of Connecticut, as well as a Master of Science in linguistics from the Massachusetts Institute of Technology (MIT). She was the first student to graduate from a two-year Masters program at MIT "for members of indigenous communities whose languages are dead or dying." Her Master's thesis, The Phonology of Mohegan-Pequot, includes diary excerpts written in Mohegan from her relative Fidelia Fielding, the last fluent speaker of the Mohegan language. Much of Fielding's graduate work focused on linguistic algorithms that allow her to take accepted proto-Algonquian words in order to recreate an authentic Mohegan vocabulary.

In 2006, Fielding published A Modern Mohegan Dictionary. She also created the online Mohegan Language Project, a central part of her efforts to keep her ancestral language alive. Of this project, Fielding states that "the goal is fluency," and offers links to a Mohegan-English dictionary, phrase book, pronunciation guide, exercises, and an audio option. In an interview with the New York Times, Fielding said "In order for a language to survive and resurrect, it needs people talking it, and for people to talk it, there has to be a society that works on it." Fielding has also written a short story collection, as well as multiple children's books to offer both children and parents exposure to and practice with the language.

She has worked "as a teacher, writer, editor, graphic artist and radio announcer. She has also served on the board of directors of educational institutions, media outlets, non-profit organizations, and religious organizations." She often translates English into Mohegan for speakers at Mohegan traditional ceremonies. She also worked "extensively" on the Walk Norwich Project in 2015 to aid in adding a Mohegan pathway.
