= Mahomet Weyonomon =

Mohegan Native American chief

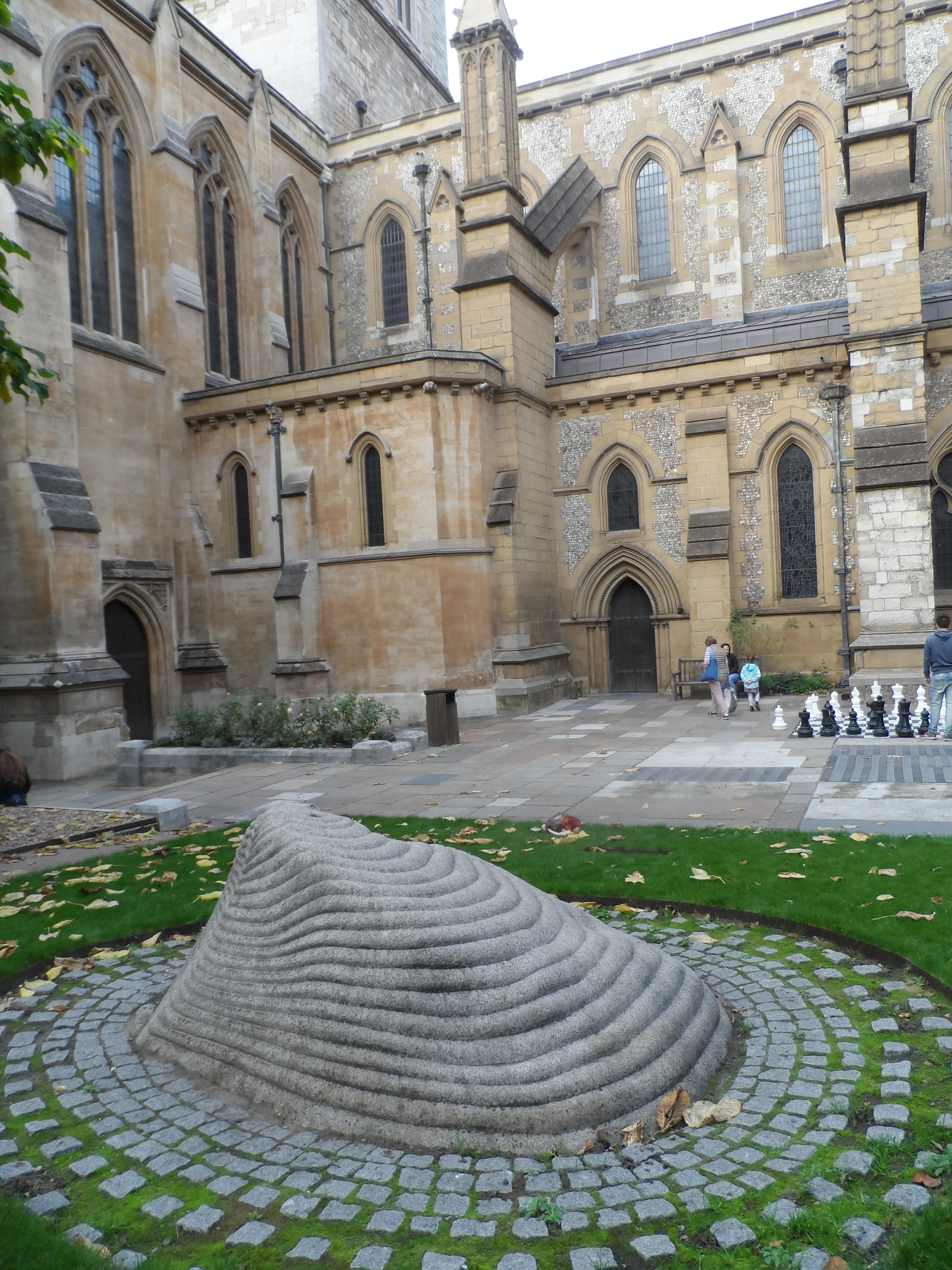
- Mahomet Weyonomon's memorial stone, London
- Born: c. 1700; Mohegan territory, Connecticut Colony
- Died: 11 August 1736 (age about 36); London, Great Britain
- Resting place: outside Southwark Cathedral
- Citizenship: Mohegan
- Title: Sachem

Mahomet Weyonomon (c. 1700 – 11 August 1736) was a Native American tribal chieftain (or sachem) of the Mohegan tribe from Connecticut, who travelled to England in 1735 to petition King George II for better treatment of his people.

== Life ==
Mahomet was the great-grandson of Uncas, an important sachem of the Mohegan tribe. In 1735, Captain John Mason, a descendant of the settler who had been asked by Uncas to act as a guardian and trustee over the Mohegan land, engineered Mahomet's election to the position of Sachem in place of his great Uncle, Ben Uncas, who was more favoured by the Colony of Connecticut.

By 1735, the Mohegan people had lost much of their planting and hunting lands to Euro-American settlers in New England. Accompanied by two settlers who supported his cause, John and Samuel Mason, and another Mohegan, AughQuant, Weyonomon travelled to England, where the four rented accommodation at St Mary Aldermanbury in the City of London while they prepared their petition to the King. King George II referred the matter to the Lords Commissioners on Foreign Trade and Plantations; however, both John Mason and Weyonomon succumbed to smallpox in 1736 before their case could be heard by the commission.

As a foreigner, he was not permitted to be buried in the City of London, and he was interred in an unmarked grave outside St Mary Overie, now Southwark Cathedral. On 22 November 2006, Queen Elizabeth II dedicated a memorial (a sculpture by British artist Peter Randall-Page) to Mahomet Weyonomon at the cathedral, accompanied by a traditional funeral ceremony conducted by members of the Mohegan tribe.
