= Fort Shantok =

Archaeological site in Connecticut, United States

Coordinates: 41.4778°N 72.0778°W

- Fort Shantok Archeological District
- U.S. National Register of Historic Places
- U.S. National Historic Landmark
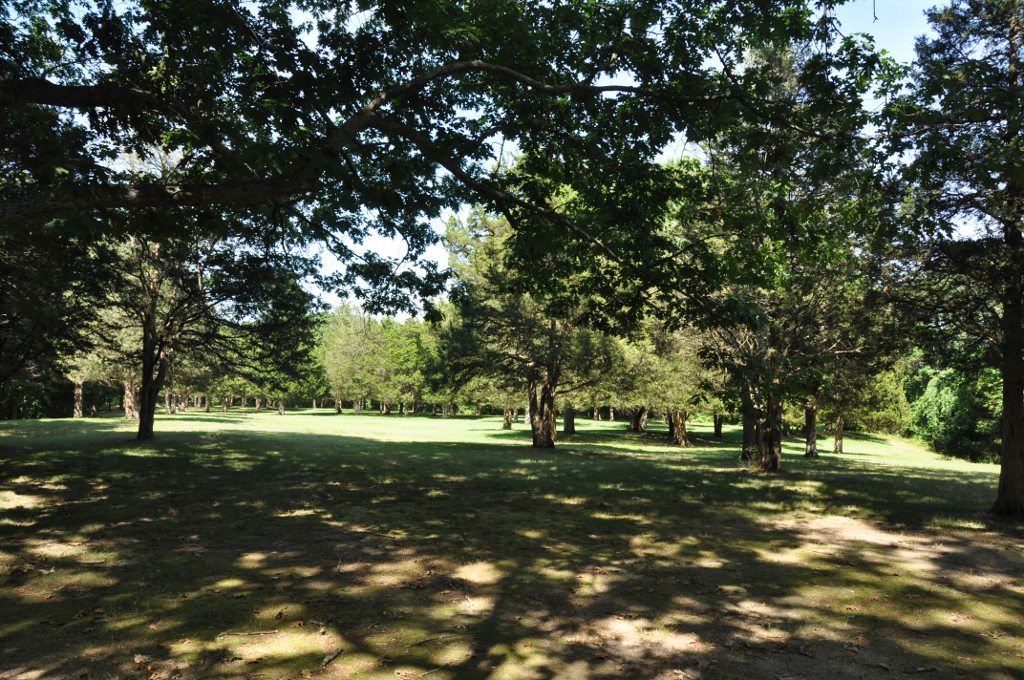

- Location within Connecticut Location within the United States
- Location: Montville, Connecticut
- NRHP reference No.: 86000469

Significant dates
- Added to NRHP: March 20, 1986
- Designated NHL: April 12, 1993

Fort Shantok, in Montville, Connecticut, United States, was the site of the principal Mohegan settlement between 1636 and 1682 and the sacred ground of Uncas, one of the most prominent and influential Mohegan leaders and statesmen of his era. Originally part of Mohegan reservation lands, the property was taken by the state of Connecticut in the 20th century and Fort Shantok State Park was established. In 1995, following legal action by the tribe to recover its lands, the state returned the park to Mohegan control. The tribe now operates the area, part of its reservation, as a local park. The grounds were declared a National Historic Landmark (as the Fort Shantok Archaeological District) in 1993.

== Description ==
The fort was purchased by the State Park and Forest commission in 1930 and added to the Fort Shantok State Park, increasing the park to 160 acres. The area was declared a National Historic Landmark in 1993. However, it does not appear that the Mohegans had a choice regarding said purchase, per the history declared by them.

In 1994, through a land claims settlement act, the Mohegans paid $3 million for return of the land.

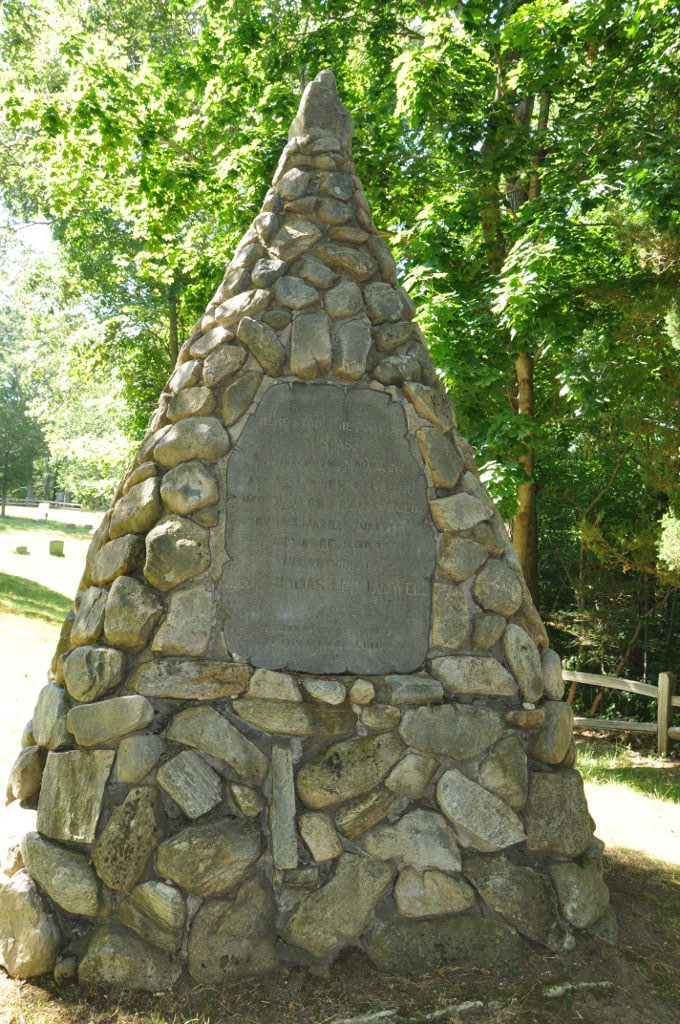
The Leffingwell Memorial marker at Fort Shantok

The district is located within the Mohegan Indian Reservation just west of the Thames River and south of the Mohegan Sun casino off Route 2A. The fort was used as a burial ground and contains over one hundred identified graves.

The Mohegans decided not to build on the land or further develop it in order to preserve the land's history. The Archaeological Consulting Services offered to preserve eight acres of the two tribal sites, but the tribe decided to preserve all the property instead.

Fort Shantok represents a location of distinction to the Mohegan people, because it is the first site where they settled with Sachem Uncas in the 17th century. In addition, Fort Shantok was used as a stronghold by the Mohegan leader Uncas when fending off an attack from the Narragansetts during 1645. Although the fort was sturdy and well-defended, the attack continued until an English force led by Lt. Thomas Leffingwell provided reprovisions. At this point, the Narragansetts abandoned the siege and returned home.

There is a memorial in the shape of a wigwam known as the Leffingwell Memorial in the fort, the inscription stating, "Here stood the fort of Uncas Sachem of the Mohegans and friend of the English; here in 1645 when beseiged [sic] by the Narragansetts he was relieved by the bravery of Lt. T. I. Leffingwell."

It is one of the few places where Native American ceramics have been preserved in southern New England in any state, due to the area's highly acidic soil, climate, and colonial construction. These ceramics have been used in an attempt by archeologists to determine migration patterns in local New England tribes, such as the Pequots.

== See also ==
- National Register of Historic Places listings in New London County, Connecticut
- List of National Historic Landmarks in Connecticut
