= Melissa Tantaquidgeon Zobel =

Mohegan author, historian (born 1960)

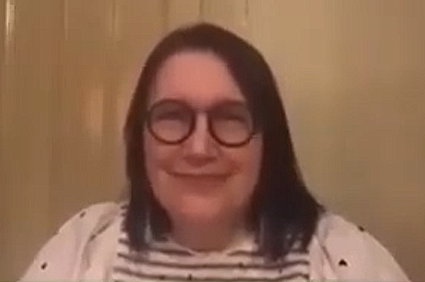
- Born: Melissa Jayne Fawcett; March 24, 1960 (age 66)
- Education: Georgetown University; University of Connecticut; Fairfield University
- Occupations: Author, Storyteller, Historian, Tribal Elder
- Spouse: Randy Zobel
- Children: 3
- Relatives: Gladys Tantaquidgeon, Madeline Sayet

Melissa Tantaquidgeon Zobel (born Melissa Jayne Fawcett; March 24, 1960) is a Mohegan author, historian, and storyteller who serves as Vice-Chairwoman for the Mohegan Tribal Council of Elders. Also a prolific writer, Zobel has published many books including the historical biography, Medicine Trail: The Life and Lessons of Gladys Tantaquidgeon, and the futuristic novel Oracles. Some publications appear under her maiden name of Melissa Jayne Fawcett.

== Education ==
Melissa Tantaquidgeon Zobel grew up on the home site of Reverend Samson Occom, one of the first Christian American Indian ministers. Her Great Aunt, Dr. Gladys Tantaquidgeon, former Mohegan Medicine Woman and a co-founder the Tantaquidgeon Indian Museum, trained the young Zobel in tribal oral traditions, beliefs and sacred practices.

Zobel served as high school president of The Williams School in New London, Connecticut. After receiving her B.S.F.S. in History and Diplomacy from Georgetown University, where she was both a member of the Phi Alpha Theta History Honor Society and recipient of the Lorenze Tsosie Native American Scholarship. She earned an M.A. in history from the University of Connecticut—the school from which both her mother and great-aunt, Dr. Gladys Tantaquidgeon, both prominent Mohegan figures, received degrees.

In 2012, Tantaquidgeon Zobel earned the degree of M.F.A. from Fairfield University.

== Career ==
Zobel has served as the storyteller of the Mohegan Tribe and traveled all throughout New England. She has held a number of tribal positions and elected posts, including the Mohegan Federal Recognition Coordinator from 1992 to 1994 and the first Native American Gubernatorial Appointee to the Connecticut Historical Commission in 1994. As an author, her first recognized work came in 1992, when she was awarded the first annual Non-Fiction Award of the Native Writers' Circle of the Americas. This accolade was presented for her manuscript, The Lasting of the Mohegans. Zobel later became the first American Indian appointed by Governor Lowell P. Weicker Jr. to the Connecticut Historical Commission.

In 1996, Zobel also received the first annual Chief Little Hatchet Award, given in recognition of her efforts in fostering the survival of the Mohegan people. She won a $10,000 essay contest in 2009 for an essay in which she shared her perspectives on the difficulties and opportunities of the current economic and political landscape. She also won a national award for The Accomac Business Model. The contest, called "Native Insight: Thoughts on Recession, Recovery & Opportunity," was sponsored by the Alaska Federation of Natives, in partnership with the National Congress of American Indians and the Council for Native Hawaiian Advancement.

In 2024, Zobel was elected to the Mohegan Council of Elders, and internally appointed as Vice-Chairwoman.

== Personal life ==
Melissa Tantaquidgeon Zobel lives in Connecticut.

== Publications ==
- Wabanaki Blues. Poisoned Pencil, 2015. ISBN 978-1929345120
- Fire Hollow. Raven's Wing Books, 2010. ISBN 0980100453
- Makiawisug: The Gift of the Little People. Little People Pubns, 1997; ISBN 0965693325
- Medicine Trail: The Life and Lessons of Gladys Tantaquidgeon. University of Arizona Press, 2000. ISBN 0816520690
- Oracles: A Novel. University of New Mexico Press, 2004; ISBN 0826331912
- The Road to Elsewhere. Scribes Valley Publishing; First edition, 2009; ISBN 0974265276
- The Lasting of the Mohegans: Part I, The Story of the Wolf People. The Mohegan Tribe, 1995; ASIN B0006QGXTK

== See also ==
- Native American women in politics
