= Gladys Tantaquidgeon =

Native American anthropologist, Medicine Woman, author (1899–2005)

Dr. Gladys Tantaquidgeon
- Born: Gladys Iola Tantaquidgeon; June 15, 1899; Mohegan Hill, Uncasville, Connecticut, USA
- Died: November 1, 2005 (aged 106); Mohegan Hill, Uncasville, Connecticut USA
- Education: University of Pennsylvania, School of Anthropology
- Occupations: Native American anthropologist, medicine woman, social worker, author
- Employer(s): Bureau of Indian Affairs, Federal Indian Arts and Crafts Board
- Known for: Preserving customary Mohegan spirituality, Native ceremonies and art forms

Gladys Iola Tantaquidgeon (June 15, 1899 – November 1, 2005) was a Mohegan medicine woman, anthropologist, author, tribal council member, and elder based in Connecticut.

As a young girl, she was selected by women elders for training in traditional pharmacology and culture. She studied anthropology at the University of Pennsylvania with Frank Speck. Beginning in 1934, Tantaquidgeon worked with the Bureau of Indian Affairs for more than a decade, including several years among western Native American tribes. Together with her father and brother, in 1931 she founded the Tantaquidgeon Indian Museum, the oldest to be owned and operated by Native Americans.

She published several books about Native American traditional medicine and healing with plants. For years she preserved vital records and correspondence of tribal members; these proved integral to the Mohegan case for federal recognition, which the Mohegan received in 1994. That year, Tantaquidgeon was inducted into the Connecticut Women's Hall of Fame.

== Biography ==
Gladys Tantaquidgeon was the third of seven children born to Mohegan parents, John and Harriet Fielding Tantaquidgeon. They lived on Mohegan Hill in Quinnetucket (Uncasville, Connecticut). She was a 10th-generation descendant of the Mohegan chief Uncas, who was prominent in the colonial era. Culturally, the Mohegan tribe is Algonquian; linguistically, they speak one of the many Algonquian languages. In childhood, Gladys learned traditional practices, beliefs, and lore from nanus, respected women elders. By age five, the tribal nanus chose her to be schooled in the traditions of Mohegan culture. One of her mentors was the Mohegan traditionalist Fidelia Fielding (1827–1908). From Fielding, she learned the ways of the makiawisug who guard the healing plants.

Another mentor was her maternal aunt, Nanu Emma Fielding Baker (1828–1916). In 1992 Baker was posthumously elected by the tribe as the Mohegan Tribal Medicine Woman and was inducted into the Connecticut Women's Hall of Fame for her work in education and preservation. Gladys started studying with her aunt in 1904, specializing in traditional herbal medicine, and attending classes in local schools.

In 1919, at the age of 20, Tantaquidgeon attended the University of Pennsylvania to study anthropology. Penn anthropologist Frank Speck met Gladys as a child while he was working with her nanu Fidelia Fielding. When Gladys was old enough, Speck invited her to study with him at Penn; he arranged housing for her with foreign students at his home in Swarthmore, enrolled her in classes, and enlisted her as a fieldwork assistant to broaden her understanding of Native American cultures. Tantaquidgeon later did field work related to the Lenape and other eastern Algonquian tribes. She expanded her knowledge of traditional pharmacopeia by researching herbal medicine practices among many related East Coast tribes.

From 1934 to 1947, at the time of the Indian Reorganization Act and the Indian New Deal under the administration of President Franklin D. Roosevelt, Tantaquidgeon started work with the US Bureau of Indian Affairs. She was hired in 1934 under the Wheeler-Howard Act to administer social service benefits for Indians. At first she was assigned to the Yankton Sioux Indian Reservation in South Dakota.

In 1938 Tantaquidgeon transferred to the Indian Arts and Crafts Board to serve as a "Native Arts Specialist". Working in the Dakotas, Montana, and Wyoming, she helped indigenous artisans preserve traditional skills and arts. In addition, she helped them form cooperatives and other institutions for the sale and management of their arts. She developed ways for tribes to revive their cultural practices. According to the Mohegan Tribal Historian Melissa Fawcett, while working for the federal Indian Arts and Crafts Board, Tantaquidgeon also helped preserve customs that had been prohibited in the 19th century, such as the Ghost Dance and the Sun Dance. Part of Tantaquidgeon's job was to encourage the restoration of these and other previously prohibited traditional practices.

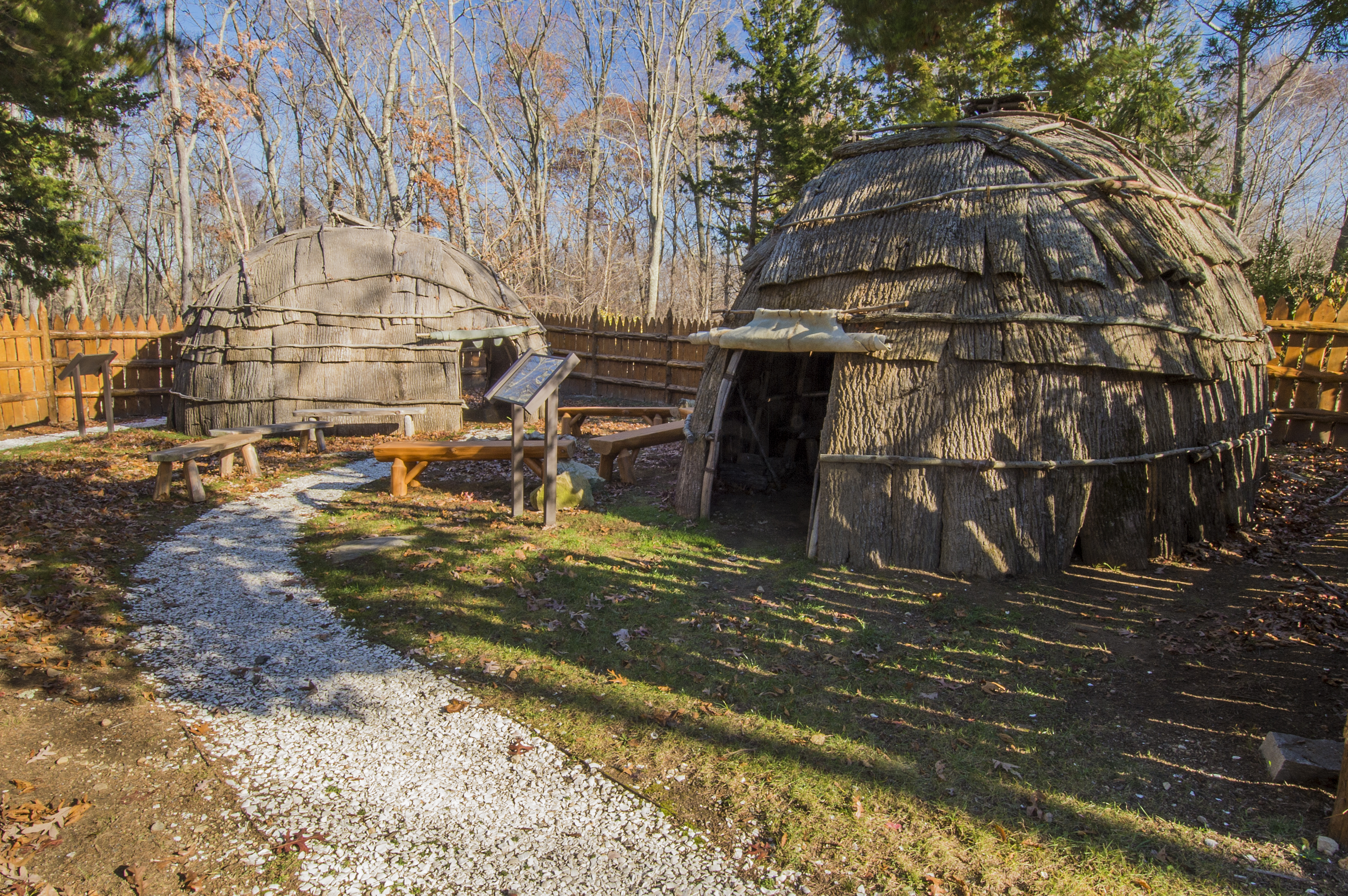
This village installation is an addition to the Tantaquidgeon Indian Museum

In 1931, Tantaquidgeon worked with her brother Harry, a former chief, and father John to found the Tantaquidgeon Indian Museum. It is the oldest such museum to be owned and operated by Native Americans. After concluding her government service in 1947, Tantaquidgeon returned to Mohegan Hill, Uncasville. She worked full-time at the museum for the next 50 years, until 1998.

As a librarian in the Niantic Women's Prison in the late 1940s, Tantaquidgeon helped minority women. During the 1970s and 1980s, she also served on the Mohegan Tribal Council, encouraging the preservation and revival of tribal customs and language. Tantaguidgeon also served as the special guardian of Mohegan Hill during the 20th century.

Tantaquidgeon published several books in her lifetime about traditional herbal medicine. Her best-known work, A Study of Delaware Indian Medicine Practices and Folk Beliefs (1942), was reprinted in 1972, 1995, and 2000 as Folk Medicine of the Delaware and Related Algonkian Indians. In 1992 she was elected as the Tribal Medicine Woman of the Mohegan. She preserved numerous records and tribal correspondence in boxes under her bed. These proved critical as documentation to aid the tribe's case for federal recognition. The tribe proved community continuity and was acknowledged as a federally recognized tribe in 1994, as part of a settlement linked to their claim for the lands that make up the present-day Mohegan reservation.

=== Legacy, awards and honors ===
- Tantaquidgeon was awarded the 'Tiffany Jewel' by the University of Connecticut for being an "outstanding role model."
- Tantaquidgeon was awarded the Connecticut Education Association's Friend of Education Award.
- For "consistent endeavor in the area of social justice", she received the National Organization for Women's Harriet Tubman Award in 1996.
- She received honorary doctorates from the University of Connecticut (Doctor of Humane Letters degree, 1987) and Yale University (1994).
- In 1994, she was inducted into the Connecticut Women's Hall of Fame.
- Her 100th birthday, June 15, 1999, was declared as 'Gladys Tantaquidgeon Day' by Gov. John G. Rowland of Connecticut; and it was marked in the U.S. Congress by Hon. Sam Gejdenson.
- Her likeness was carved out of sacred basswood and resides in the Tantaquidgeon Museum.
