= Tantaquidgeon Museum =

Oldest Native American Owned and Operated Museum

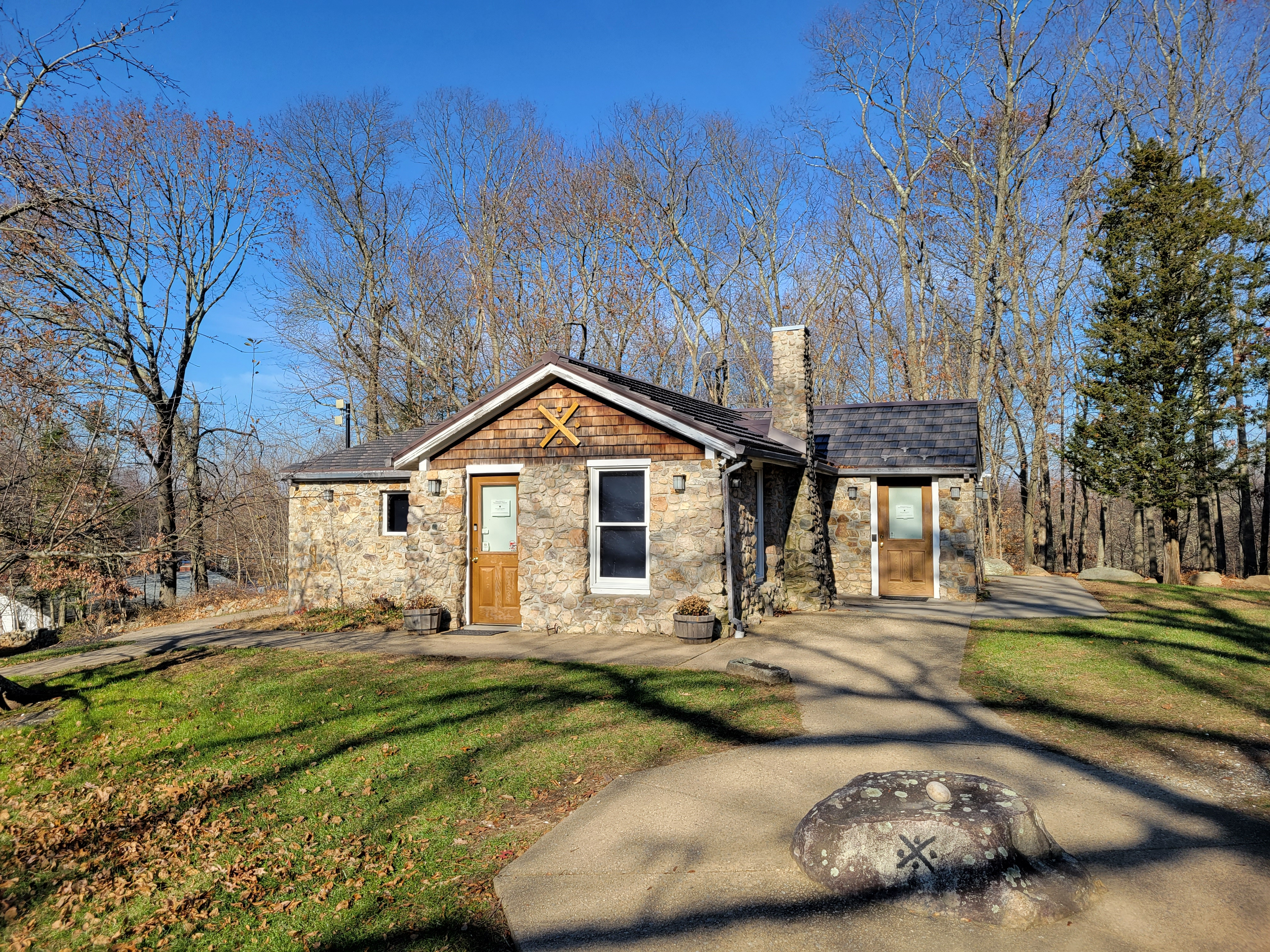
- Outside of Museum in Uncasville, CT
- Established: 1931
- Location: Mohegan Tribe of Indians of Connecticut, Connecticut, United States

The Tantaquidgeon Museum is the oldest museum in the United States that is owned and operated by a Native American tribe. Located in Uncasville, Connecticut, it was founded in 1931 by Gladys Tantaquidgeon, a Mohegan medicine woman and anthropologist, alongside her father John Tantaquidgeon and his brother Harold Tantaquidgeon. The museum remains a cultural institution for the Mohegan Tribe that preserves Native American heritage, especially Mohegan traditions, stories, and artifacts.

== History ==
The Tantaquidgeon Museum was established in 1931 as part of an effort to protect Mohegan culture at a time when Native American traditions were under threat. Gladys Tantaquidgeon, trained in anthropology at the University of Pennsylvania under Frank Speck, envisioned the museum as a place where Mohegan people could reclaim and preserve their history on their own terms.

Built from native stone, the museum is located on Mohegan Hill near the Mohegan Church. It was one of the earliest institutions in the country founded by Native people to educate both Native and non-Native audiences about indigenous culture, medicine, and spirituality.

== Collections ==
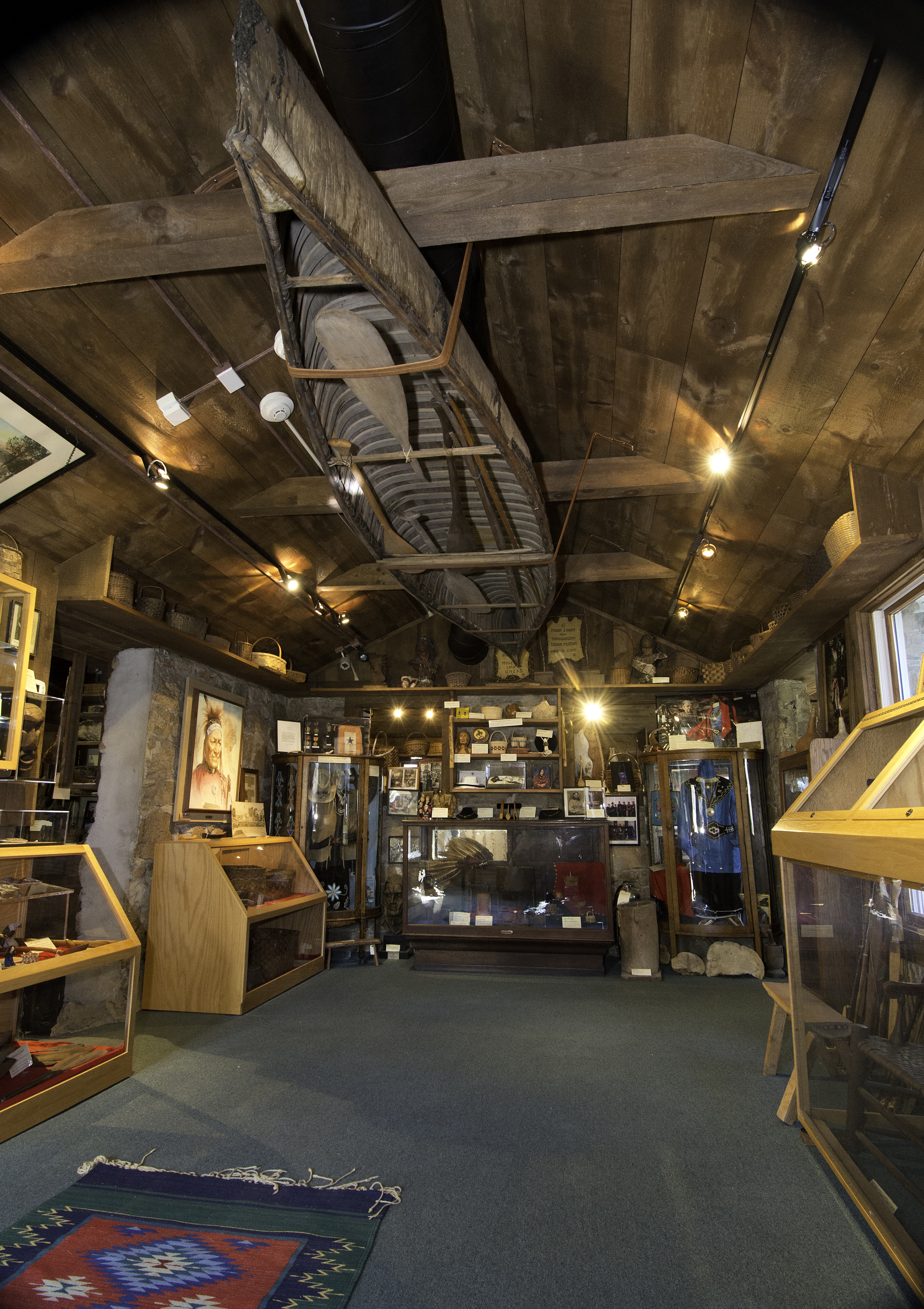
Interior of the museum.

The museum houses a wide array of Native American artifacts, including Mohegan baskets, clothing, tools, and ceremonial items. Over time, the collection has grown to include items from other tribes across North America. One of its most important features is its archive of oral histories and written records of Mohegan culture, many of which were preserved by Gladys Tantaquidgeon herself.

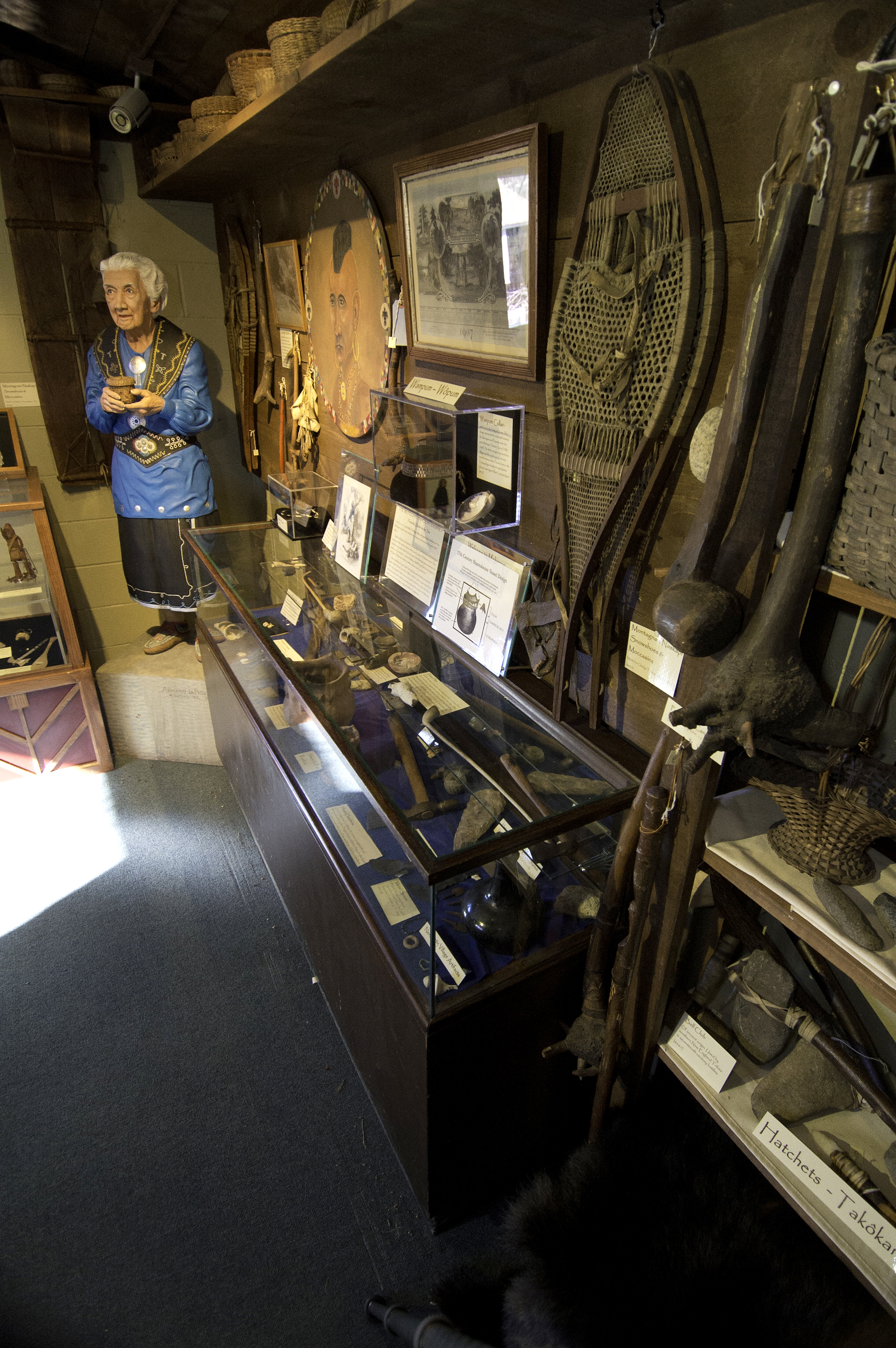
Interior exhibit showcasing Mohegan artifacts.

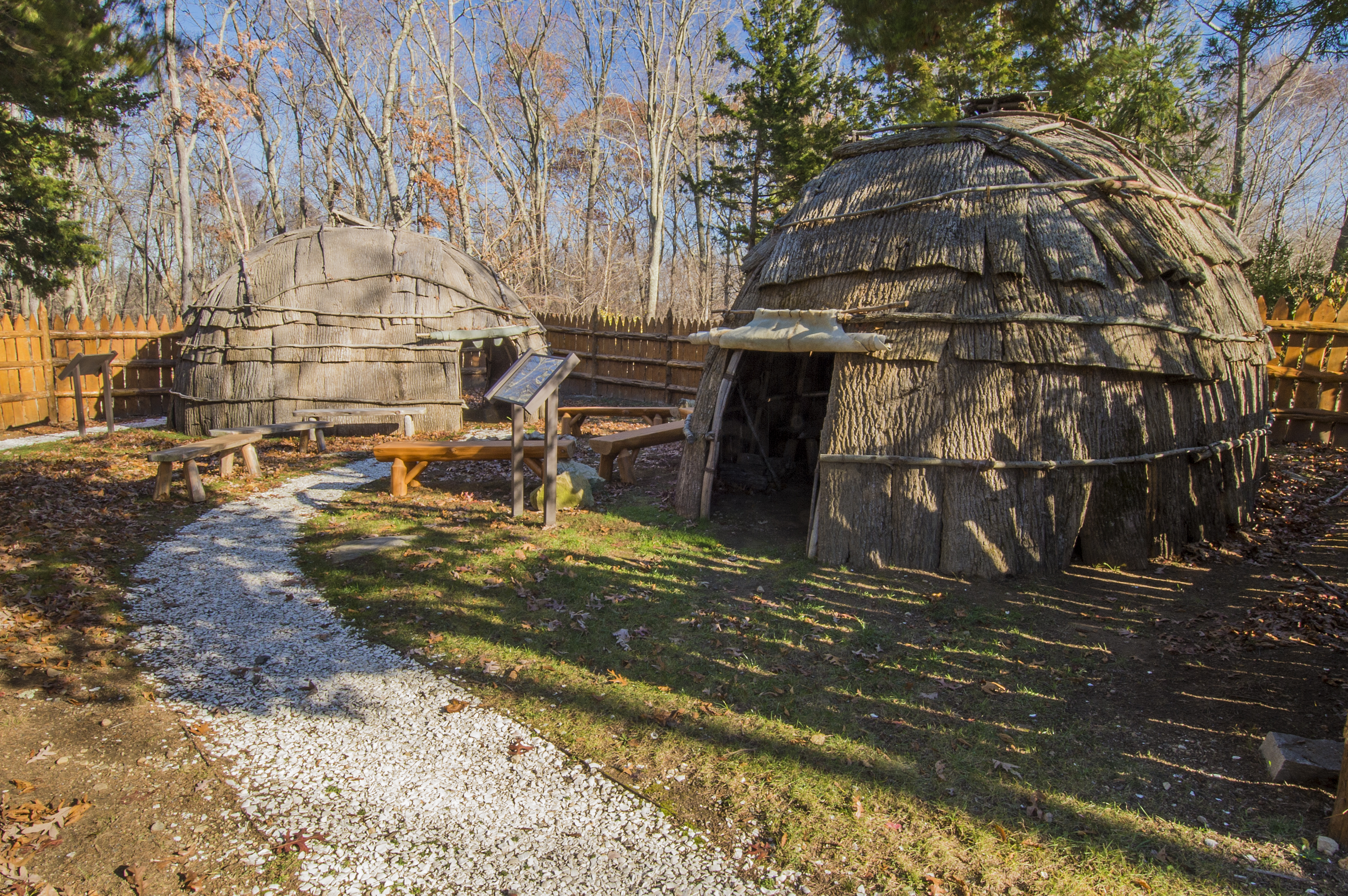
Traditional village exhibit in the exterior of the museum.

In 2017, Yale University transferred a collection of historical Mohegan artifacts back to the tribe, which were then housed at the Tantaquidgeon Museum. This act marked a significant milestone in Mohegan efforts to reclaim their cultural patrimony and expand the museum's holdings.

== Impact ==
The Tantaquidgeon Museum serves not only as a historical archive but also as a center for cultural education and revitalization. It has played a central role in the Mohegan Tribe's preservation and teaching of language, traditions, and spiritual practices. It remains free and open to the public, operating as a symbol of Native self-determination in cultural preservation.

The museum has also become a model for other indigenous-run institutions around the world, offering an alternative to traditional Western museum models by emphasizing community engagement and cultural continuity.

== Founders ==
=== Gladys Tantaquidgeon ===
Gladys Tantaquidgeon (1899–2005) was a revered Mohegan elder, anthropologist, and author. She worked for the Bureau of Indian Affairs and served as a tribal council member for decades. Her book, Folk Medicine of the Delaware and Related Algonkian Indians, remains a seminal work in the field of indigenous ethnobotany. She was inducted into the Connecticut Women's Hall of Fame in recognition of her contributions to cultural preservation and education.

== Educational programs ==
The museum has long been involved in educational outreach, both in-person and online. It has partnered with schools and organizations to provide resources on Native American history and culture, especially through local initiatives such as Where I Live: Connecticut.

== See also ==
- Mohegan Congregational Church, the building that prevented the Mohegans from being expelled via the Trail of Tears
