= Pequot (disambiguation) =

The Pequot are a Native American people of Connecticut.

Pequot may also refer to:

- Pequot language, historically spoken by the people
- Pequot Capital Management, a hedge fund
- USS Pequot, a list of ships
- Pequot war the Wikipedia article
- The Pequot War a nonfiction book by Alfred A. Cave

== See also ==
- Pequod (disambiguation)
