= Mystic massacre =

Massacre of American Indians during the Pequot War

Coordinates: 41°21′35″N 71°58′36″W

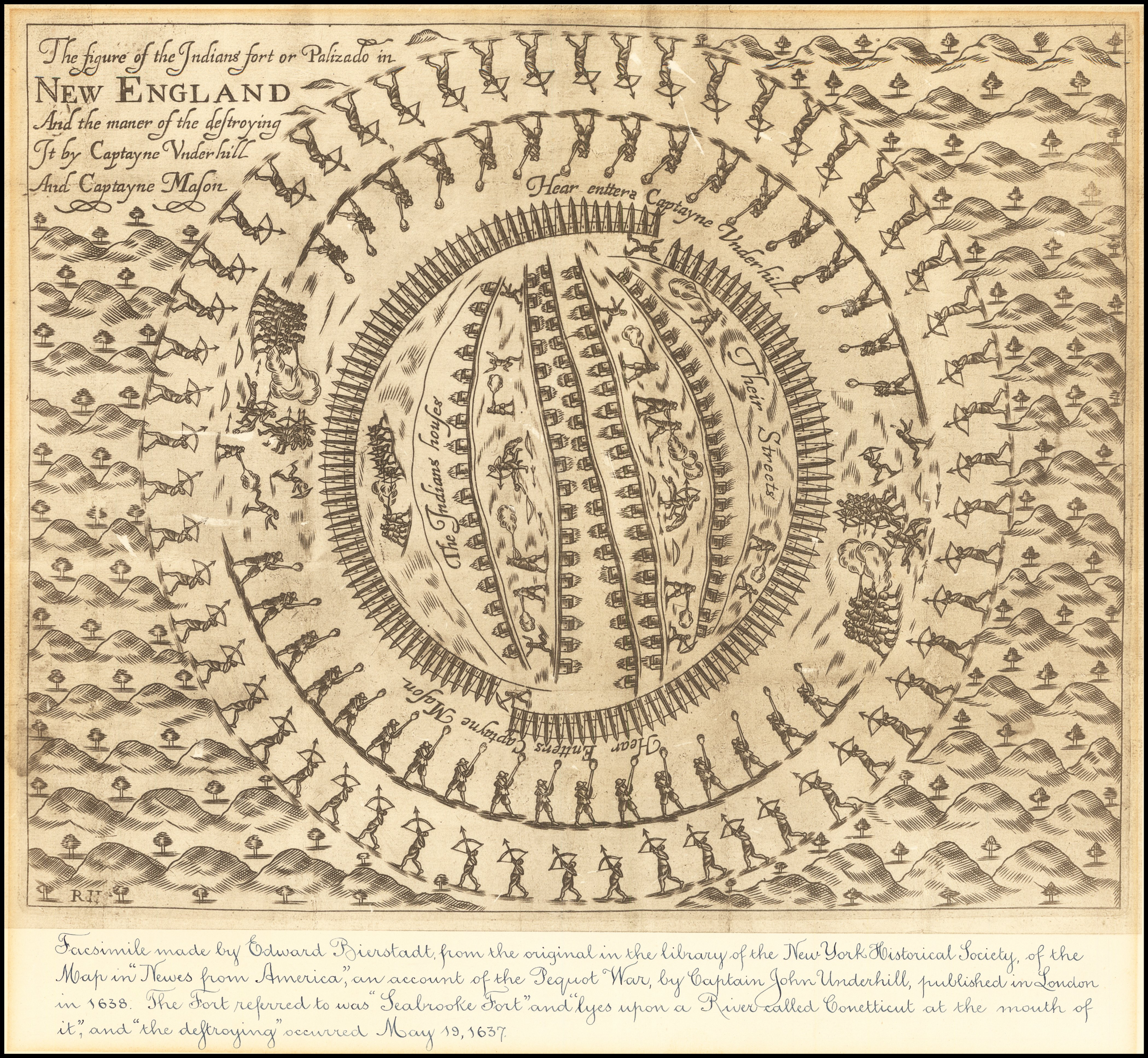
Engraving depicting the attack on the Pequot Fort, published in 1638 (Photo Facsimile made in circa 1870)

The Mystic massacre – also known as the Pequot massacre and the Battle of Mystic Fort – took place on May 26, 1637 during the Pequot War, when a force from the Connecticut Colony under Captain John Mason and their Narragansett and Mohegan allies set fire to the Pequot Fort near the Mystic River. They shot anyone who tried to escape the wooden palisade fortress and killed most of the village. There were between 400 and 700 Pequots killed during the attack; the only Pequot survivors were warriors who were away in a raiding party with their sachem Sassacus.

== Background ==
The Pequots were the dominant Native American tribe in the southeastern portion of the Connecticut Colony, and they had long been enemies of the neighboring Mohegan and Narragansett tribes. The New England colonists established trade with all three tribes, exchanging European goods for wampum and furs. The Pequots eventually allied with the Dutch colonists, while the Mohegans and others allied with the New England colonists.

A trader named John Oldham was murdered and his trading ship looted by Pequots, and retaliation raids ensued by Colonists and their Native American allies. On April 23, 1637, 200 Pequot warriors attacked the village of Wethersfield killing six men and three women, all unarmed noncombatants. This was a major turning point in the Pequot war as it enraged the settlers that the warriors would kill civilians and led to increased support for the Pequot War among colonists. According to Katherine Grandjean, the Great Colonial Hurricane of 1635 damaged the corn and other crop harvests of that year, making food supplies scarce and creating competition for winter food supplies. This in turn increased the tensions between the Pequots and Colonists who were ill-prepared to face periods of famine.

== Massacre ==
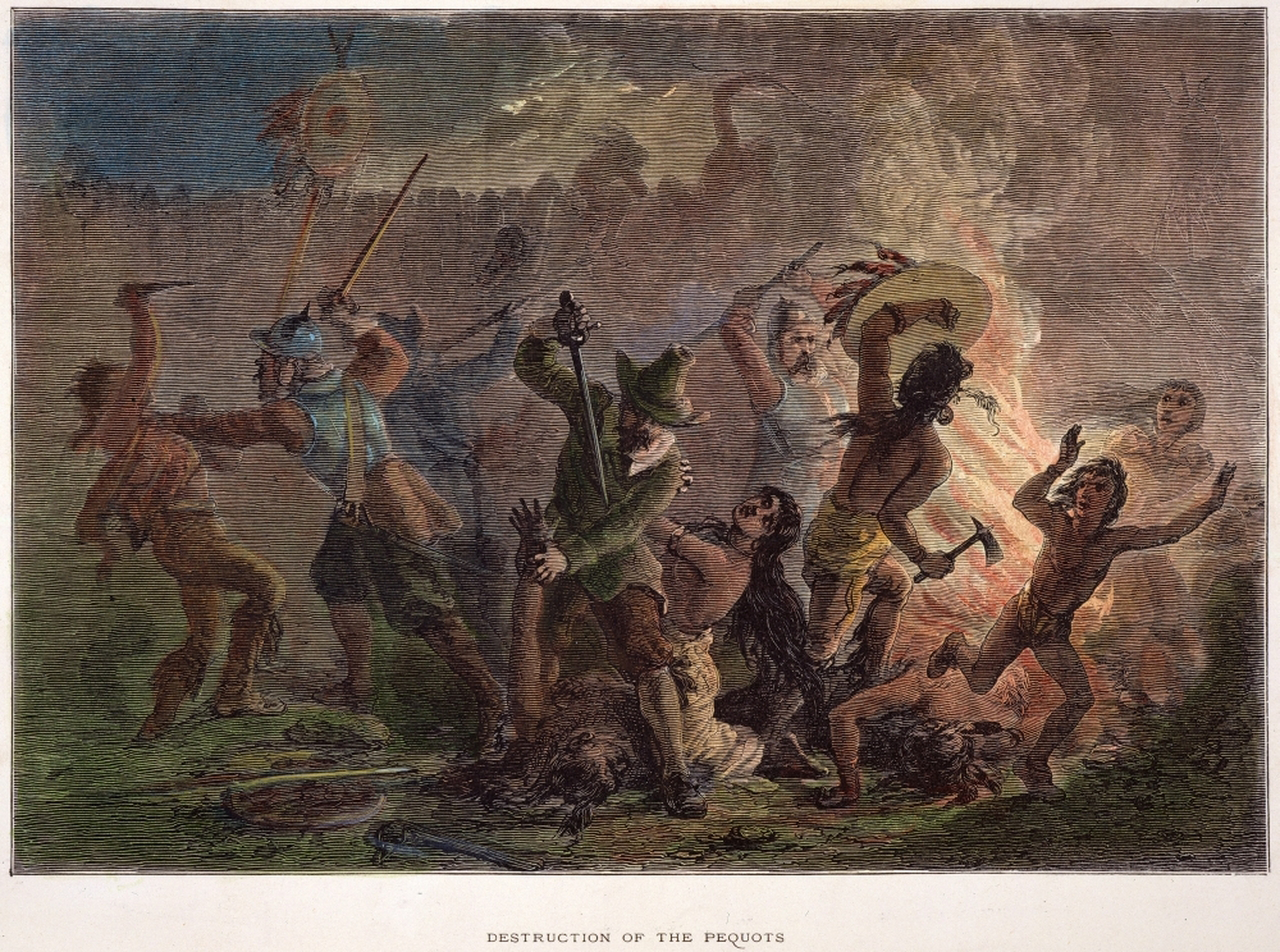
Destruction of the Pequots and their fort near Stonington, Connecticut by the English colonists under the command of Captain John Mason, May 1637

The Connecticut towns raised a militia commanded by Captain John Mason consisting of 90 men, plus 70 Mohegans under sachems Uncas and Wequash. Twenty more men under Captain John Underhill joined him from Fort Saybrook. At the same time, Pequot sachem Sassacus took a few hundred warriors and set out to attack Hartford, Connecticut.

Captain Mason recruited more than 200 Narragansett and Niantic Natives to join his force. On the night of May 26, 1637, the Colonial and Native forces arrived at the fortified Pequot village, which was on a low hill near the Mystic River. The large village was surrounded by a palisade with only two exits. The Colonial forces first attempted a surprise attack but they withdrew after stiff resistance from the Pequots.

In response, Mason ordered that the village should be set ablaze and its two exits blocked off. As the fire raged, many trapped Pequots were shot as they attempted to escape by climbing over the palisade; those men, women, and children who did get out were killed by Narragansett fighters. Captain Underhill described the scene and his participation:

"Captaine Mason entring into a Wigwam, brought out a fire-brand, after hee had wounded many in the house, then hee set fire on the West-side where he entred, my selfe set fire on the South end with a traine of Powder, the fires of both meeting in the center of the Fort blazed most terribly, and burnt all in the space of halfe an houre; many couragious fellowes were unwilling to come out, and fought most desperately through the Palisadoes, so as they were scorched and burnt with the very flame, and were deprived of their armes, in regard the fire burnt their very bowstrings, and so perished valiantly: mercy they did deserve for their valour, could we have had opportunitie to have bestowed it; many were burnt in the Fort, both men, women, and children, others forced out, and came in troopes to the Indians, twentie, and thirtie at a time, which our souldiers received and entertained with the point of the sword; downe fell men, women, and children, those that scaped us, fell into the hands of the Indians, that were in the reere of us; it is reported by themselves, that there were about foure hundred soules in this Fort, and not above five of them escaped out of our hands."

Mohegans would collect the heads of fallen Pequots, taking scalps as war trophies. Hundreds of Pequots were killed; the colonists reported that only five village occupants escaped while seven were taken prisoner.

Returning Pequot warriors chased after the Colonial forces after discovering the massacre, but the Connecticut forces avoided any Pequot counterattack despite getting lost for a brief period during their retreat back to the Connecticut Colony.

== Aftermath ==
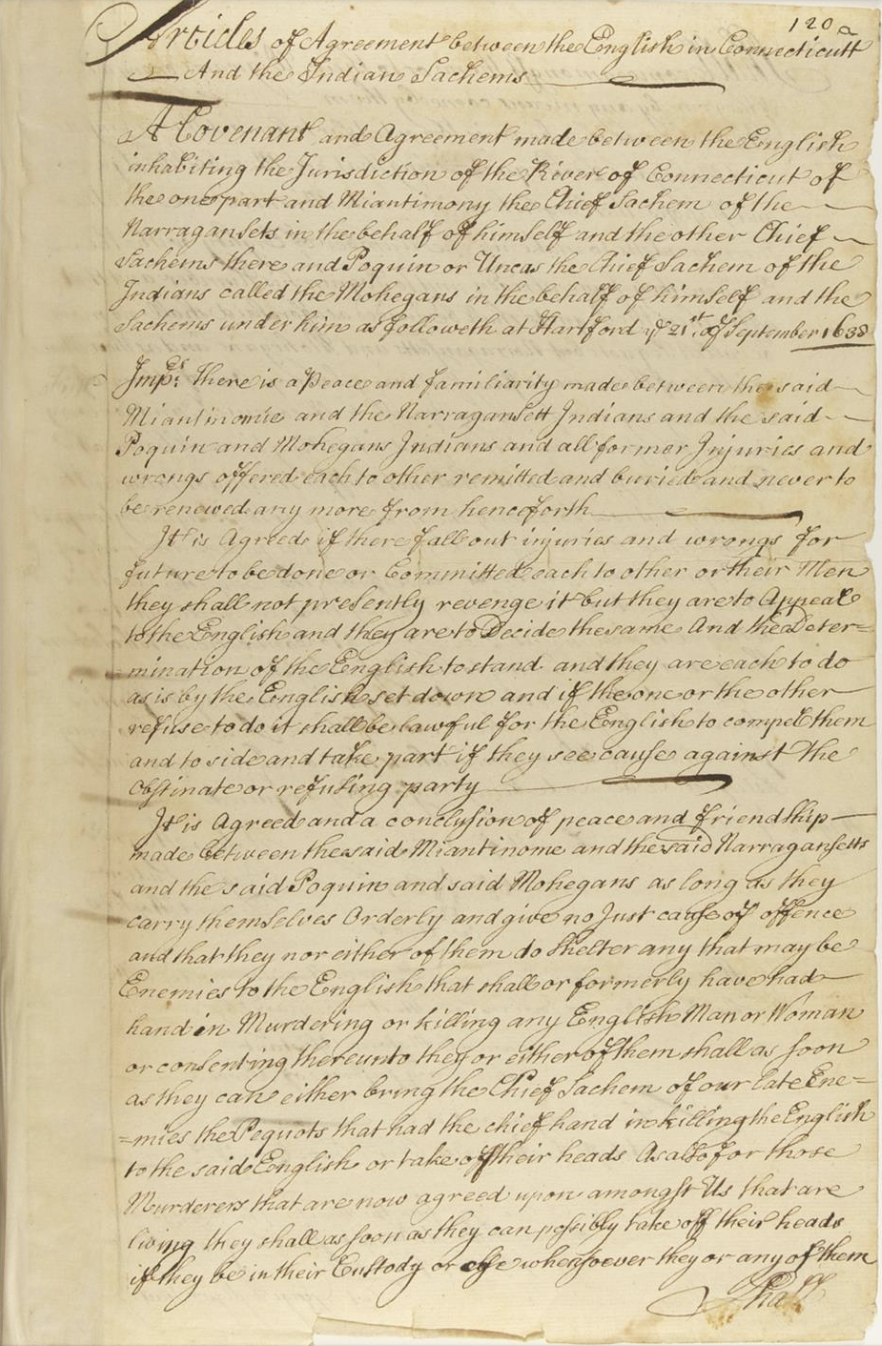
A 1743 copy of the Treaty of Hartford of 1638, which was imposed by the English colonists and sought to eradicate the Pequot cultural identity by prohibiting the Pequots from returning to their lands, speaking their tribal language, or referring to themselves as Pequots.

Estimates of Pequot deaths range from 400 to 700, including women, children, and the elderly. The colonists suffered between 22 and 26 casualties with two confirmed dead. Approximately 40 Narragansett warriors were wounded as the colonists mistook many of them for Pequots. The massacre effectively broke the Pequots, and Sassacus and many of his followers were surrounded in a swamp near a Mattabesset village called Sasqua. The battle which followed is known as the "Fairfield Swamp Fight", in which nearly 180 warriors were killed, wounded, or captured. Sassacus escaped with about 80 of his men, but he was killed by the Mohawks, who sent his scalp to the colonists as a symbol of friendship.

The Pequot numbers were so diminished that they ceased to be a tribe in most senses. The treaty mandated that the remaining Pequots were to be absorbed into the Mohegan and Narragansett tribes, nor were they allowed to refer to themselves as Pequots. In the latter half of the 20th century, Pequot descendants revived the tribe, achieving federal recognition in 1983 and settlement of some land claims.

== Modern reappraisals ==
During the emergence of the modern Pequot tribe in the 1990s, an article in The New England Quarterly considered arguments for and against whether the Mystic massacre should be considered an act of genocide. Rebecca Joyce Frey lists the incident as genocide in her 2009 book Genocide and International Justice. Steven M. Wise from Harvard Law School called the Mystic Massacre "the Puritans genocidal Indian War" where "one thousand Indians" were killed. Wise notes that Captain John Underhill justified the killing of the elderly, women, children, and the infirm by stating that "sometimes the Scripture declareth women and children must perish with their parents [...] We had sufficient light from the Word of God for our proceedings."

In 2020, some people called for the removal of a statue of John Mason at Palisado Green in Windsor, Connecticut following national civil rights protests about the removal of Confederate monuments and memorials. The statue was originally erected on the site of the Mystic Massacre in 1889, but it was moved to Windsor in 1996 because it was the location of Mason's home. In September 2020, the town council voted 5-4 to remove the statue and give it to Windsor Historical Society. But Dr. Kevin McBride, Director of Research at the Pequot Museum, noted that, when it was removed from its original location of the Mystic Massacre in the 1990s, the Pequot's tribal chairman Skip Hayward was against its removal because "If you take it down," he said, "no one will remember what happened here."

In early 2021, some people called for the removal of another statue depicting John Mason that stands outside the Connecticut State Capitol in Hartford. After a year of deliberations, a state commission decided that the statue should be removed but lawmakers from the Connecticut General Assembly would be permitted to debate its future.

The Mystic massacre was featured in the History Channel series 10 Days That Unexpectedly Changed America.

== See also ==
- Robert Seeley
