= Major Mason's Brief History of the Pequot War =

Major Mason's Brief History of the Pequot War is a 1677 historical primary source memoir of the Pequot War, written by the commander of the Connecticut Colony forces John Mason. It was written in 1670, but only posthumously published in 1677. Mason's work spans 12,000 words, including mention of his command over the Mystic massacre. Mason's history was heavily referenced by Increase Mather in his work A Relation of the Troubles.
