= John Mason (colonist) =

English Army major (1600–1672)

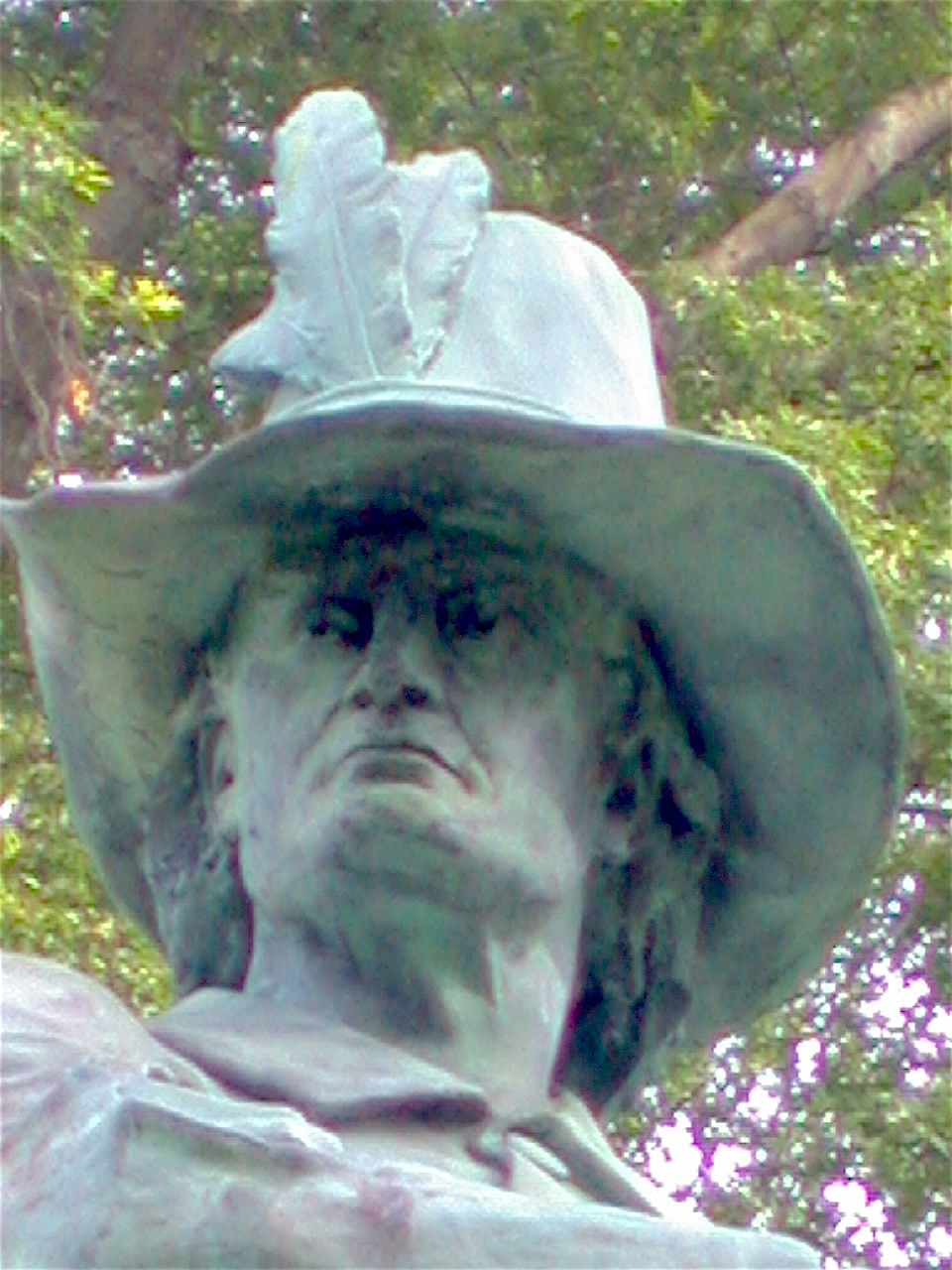

8th Deputy Governor of the Connecticut Colony
- In office 1660–1669
- Preceded by: John Winthrop the Younger
- Succeeded by: William Leete

Personal details
- Born: October 1600 Ravensthorpe, Northamptonshire, England
- Died: January 30, 1672 (aged 71) Norwich, Connecticut Colony, British America
- Spouse: Anne Peck
- Children: 8
- Nickname: "The Major"

Military service
- Allegiance: England; Massachusetts Bay Colony; Connecticut Colony
- Branch/service: English Army; Massachusetts Bay Militia; Connecticut Militia
- Rank: Major
- Battles/wars: Siege of Breda; Siege of 's-Hertogenbosch; Pequot War

John Mason (October 1600 – January 30, 1672) was an English-born settler, soldier, commander and Deputy Governor of the Connecticut Colony. Mason was best known for leading a group of Puritan settlers and Indian allies on a combined attack on a Pequot Fort in an event known as the Mystic Massacre. The destruction and loss of life he oversaw effectively ended the hegemony of the Pequot tribe in southeast Connecticut.

== Early life and education ==
Mason was born in Ravensthorpe, Northamptonshire, England. John Mason's baptism is recorded in the St. Deny's church records on October 5, 1600, and lists his father as Richard Mason, who was married on May 23, 1600, in Ravensthorpe to Alis Burlyn - Burlyn is probably an error for Butlyn because Alis Butlyn was baptized in Ravensthorpe on September 9, 1576. Alis could be the phonetic version of Alice.

Little is known about his youth and life there. Mason was well educated, but it is not known where he was schooled in England or perhaps a military school in the Netherlands. He enlisted in the military in 1624 and then went to the Netherlands to serve in the sectarian Thirty Years' War (1618–1648), where he gained significant tactical military experience, first seeing action in the Breda Campaign. His activities from the earliest days in New England give evidence of training as a military engineer. His prose is vigorous and direct in his regular correspondence with the Winthrop Family and in his history of the Pequot War.

By 1629 he was a lieutenant in the Brabant Campaign and participated in the Siege of s'-Hertogenbosch, literally "The Duke's Forrest" in English, and known historically in French as Bois-le-Duc. He served with Lord Thomas Fairfax under General Sir Horace Vere in the army of Frederik Hendrik, The Prince of Orange.

== Early life in America ==
In 1632, he joined the great Puritan exodus and sailed from England to the Massachusetts Bay Colony, settling in Dorchester where he was promptly appointed as the captain of the local militia. In 1633, he commanded the first American naval task force and pursued the pirate Dixie Bull, routing him from New England waters. He and Roger Ludlow planned and supervised the construction of the first fortifications on Castle Island (later known as Fort Independence) in Boston Harbor. In 1634, he was elected to represent Dorchester in the Massachusetts General Court, where permission was granted for him to remove to the fertile Connecticut River valley. In 1635, he settled in Windsor, Connecticut, at the confluence of the Farmington River and the Connecticut River; he lived there for the next twelve years and served as a civil Magistrate and military leader of the nascent Connecticut Colony. In 1640, he married Anne Peck from a prominent Puritan family; they had eight children.

== Pequot War 1636–1638 ==
The main battle of the Pequot War started in the predawn hours of May 26, 1637, when Colonial forces led by Captains John Mason and lieutenant Robert Seeley, along with their Indian allies, attacked one of two main fortified Pequot villages at Mystic. Only 20 soldiers breached the palisade's gate and were quickly overwhelmed, to the point that they utilized fire to create chaos and facilitate their escape from within. Sergeant William Hayden of Windsor is credited with saving the life of Captain Mason inside the fort, using his sword to cut through the bow-string of one of the Pequot warriors aiming his weapon at Mason. The ensuing conflagration trapped the majority of the Pequots and caused their death; those who managed to exit were slain by the sword or musket from the others who surrounded the fort. Only a handful of approximately 500 men, women, and children survived what became known as the Battle of Mistick Fort.

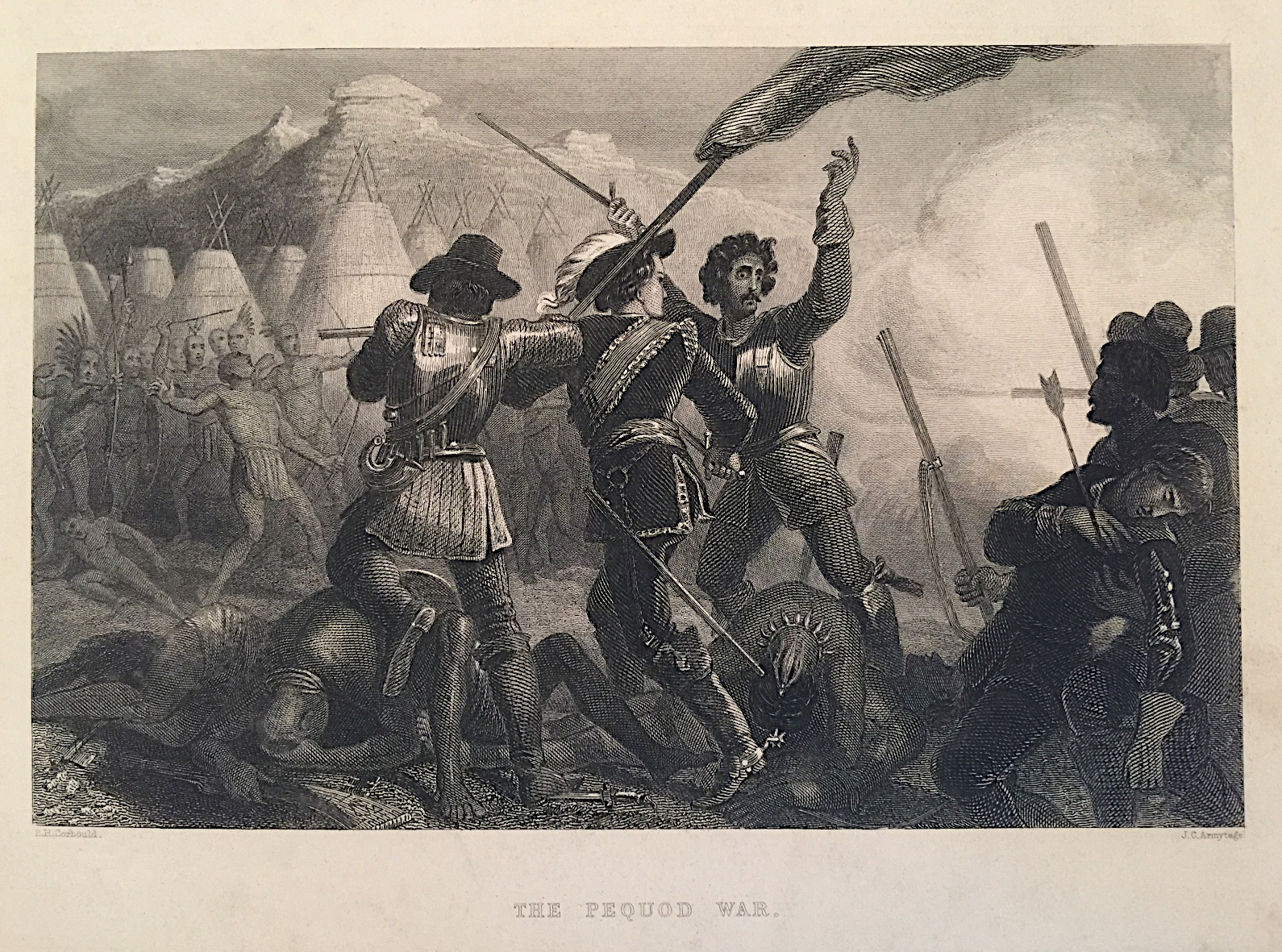
Pequot War Etching

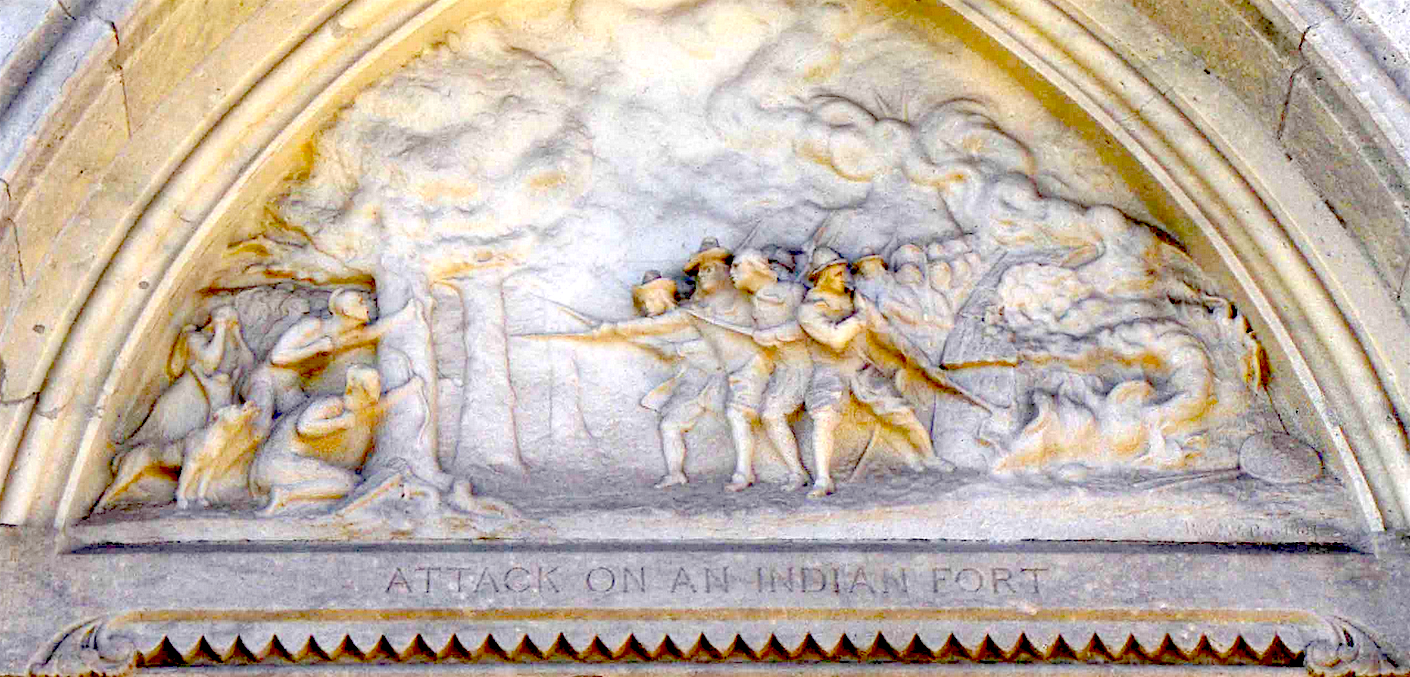
Pequot War Attack

As the soldiers made the exhausted withdrawal march to their boats, they faced several attacks by frantic warriors from the other village of Weinshauks, but again the Pequots suffered very heavy losses versus relatively few by the Colonists. These two defeats broke the resources and spirit of the tribe, who then decided to retreat west to the Hudson River area. They were pursued along the southern coast, with other confrontations at Sachem's Head and the Fairfield swamp, suffering more deaths and capture. Pequot grand sachem Sassacus and his core band did make it to New York, but Sassacus was killed there by the Mohawks; they cut off his hands and head and delivered them to the Massachusetts Bay Colony without explanation for their actions.

Mason recounted his experiences in the Pequot War in his memoir Major Mason's Brief History of the Pequot War, which was originally printed in 1677 by Increase Mather and later reprinted by Thomas Prince in 1736.

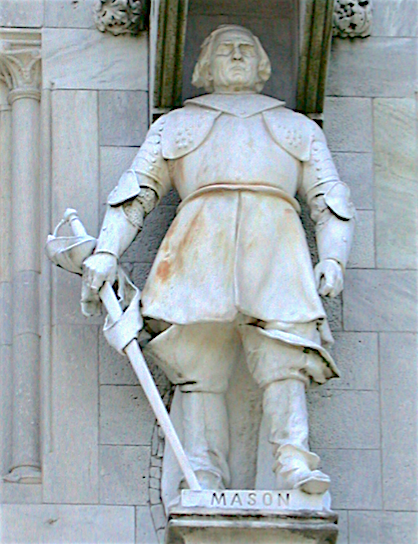
Capitol Figure

The most prominent episode in Mason's lifelong career of public service was his overall command as captain of the Colonial forces in the Pequot War in 1637. This was the first declared and sustained conflict in Southern New England, a complex and risky campaign. The large and powerful Pequot Tribe had subjugated other local tribes, killed numerous Colonial settlers and destroyed vital corn crops. The Massachusetts Bay Colony eventually declared war with them, and reluctantly the infant Connecticut Colony was quickly drawn into the conflict.

The Pequots greatly outnumbered the colonists, but had inferior weapons and tactics. The colonists also had the guidance and support of numerous Indian allies who were tributaries to the Pequots, especially Mohegan Sachem Uncas, who formed a unique and lasting bond with Mason and also Wequash Cooke. This brief and decisive war, with the Mystic Massacre in particular, forever changed the complexion of American society. It is debated whether or not this event is considered a battle or massacre, given it may have involved deliberate arson of an indigenous village, with deaths of women and children estimated in the hundreds. The battle at Mistick Fort was featured in the History Channel series 10 Days That Unexpectedly Changed America, and is central to scholarly arguments regarding genocide studies in the colonial era. Following this victory, Mason was promoted to major and received numerous land grants as a reward for his services. Mason's Island at the mouth of the Mystic River remained in his family for over 250 years.

== After the Pequot War ==
In 1640, an event took place that forever changed the political boundaries of the Connecticut River Valley. From its founding until that time, Springfield, Massachusetts (then called Agawam) had been administered by the Connecticut Colony, along with Connecticut's three other settlements at Wethersfield, Hartford, and Windsor. In the spring of 1640, grain was very scarce and cattle were dying of starvation. The nearby Connecticut River Valley settlements of Windsor (then called "Matianuck") and Hartford (then called "Newtown") gave power to William Pynchon, the founder of Springfield, to buy corn for all three English settlements. If the Indians would not sell their corn at market prices, then Pynchon was authorized to offer more money. The Indians refused to sell their corn at market prices, and then later refused to sell it at "reasonable" prices. Pynchon refused to buy it, believing it best not to broadcast the English colonists' weaknesses, and also wanting to keep market values steady.

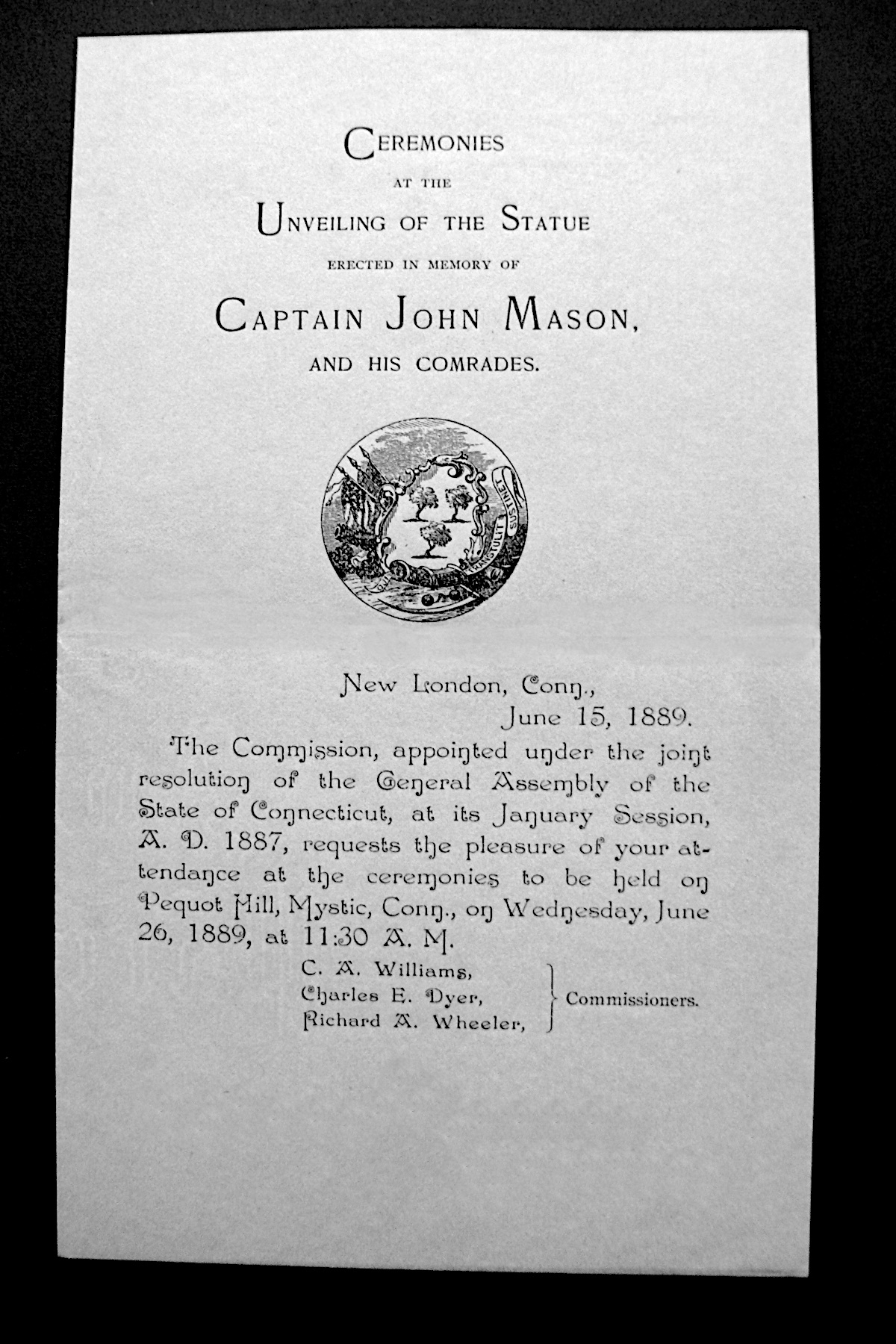
1889 Unveiling Invitation

Leading citizens of what became Hartford were furious with Pynchon for not purchasing any grain. With Windsor and Wethersfield's consent, the three southerly settlements commissioned John Mason to travel to Springfield with "money in one hand and a sword in the other." On reaching what became Springfield, Mason threatened the local Indians with war if they did not sell their corn at a "reasonable price." The Indians capitulated and ultimately sold the colonists corn; however, Mason's intimidating approach led to the Indians' deepening distrust of the English colonists. Pynchon, an avowed "man of peace," believed in negotiation with the Indians, whereas Mason believed in subduing Indians by force, if necessary. This philosophical difference led to Mason using "hard words" against Pynchon. Pynchon's settlement, however, agreed with him and his philosophy, and that same year voted to separate from the Connecticut Colony and be annexed by the Massachusetts Bay Colony. As this local controversy was heating up, the Massachusetts Bay Colony decided to reassert its jurisdiction over the land bordering the Connecticut River, realizing that it was valuable for farming.

In 1645, Sir Thomas Fairfax was made commander in chief, and he addressed a letter to Major Mason in Connecticut urging him to return to England, join his standard, and accept a Major-General's commission in the Parliamentary Army to serve in the English Civil War. Mason declined this offer and remained in Connecticut.

In 1647, Mason assumed command of Saybrook Fort which controlled the main trade and supply route to the upper river valley. The fort mysteriously burned to the ground but another improved fort was quickly built nearby. He spent the next twelve years there and served as Commissioner of the United Colonies, as the chief military officer, magistrate, and peacekeeper. He was continually called upon to negotiate the purchase of Indian lands, write treaties, or arbitrate some Indian quarrel, many of which were instigated by his friend Uncas. His leadership abilities were unrivaled, which prompted the New Haven Colony to offer him a very lucrative position as manager of their enterprise in relocating to the Delaware River area. However, he declined the offer and remained in Connecticut.

== Founding of Norwich ==
In 1659, Major Mason moved from the mouth of the Connecticut River to the head of the Thames River, together with his son-in-law Rev. James Fitch and most of the Saybrook residents, and founded the town of Norwich, Connecticut. The land "nine miles square" was purchased from Mohegan Sachem Uncas, who also signed all the territory in his tribe's domain over to Mason as a protector and administrator. Questions regarding title and control of these thousands of acres created legal disputes which lasted for seventy years; the Mohegan Land Case actually consisted of several cases and appeals making their way through various courts in Connecticut, Massachusetts, and even back in London, England, before the Lords Commissioners. Several of the Major's Mason's descendants in the role of the Tribal overseers, went bankrupt and even died in England in the process of defending the Mohegan land rights.

During his twelve years in Norwich, John Mason served for nine years as Deputy Governor (1660 to 1669), and he helped to write the Connecticut Charter. He served as acting Governor from 1661 to 1663 while Governor John Winthrop Jr. went to England to obtain approval of the Charter from King Charles II.

John Mason was one of the most trusted men in Connecticut during his three and a half decades of residence there, in both civil and military matters. In his latter years, the formal colony records referred to him simply as "the Major," without forename or surname.

== Later life and death ==
In the summer of 1670, Mason acted as an intermediary between Roger Williams and the Connecticut government regarding a boundary dispute between Rhode Island and Connecticut.

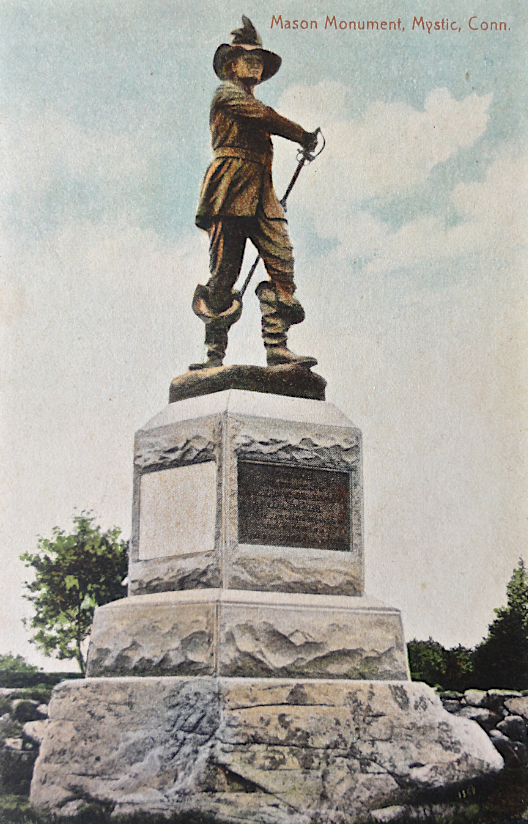
Mason Statue Mystic Conn

In 1669, pleading old age and infirmities, he retired to a revered advisory position, but he suffered painfully in the last years of his life from cancer, which was then referred to as the "strangury". He died on January 30, 1672, from complications related to cancer. He is buried, although unmarked, in the Post-Gager cemetery with the other founders of Norwichtown, Connecticut.

== Family ==
John Mason married his first wife (name unknown) in 1634 at Dorchester; she died in the spring of 1638 at Windsor. They had a daughter named Israel who was born in the winter of 1635 at Windsor; she married John Bissell Jr. on June 17, 1657, at Windsor. They had nine children. He died in 1693 and it is uncertain when she died.

Mason married Anne Peck in July 1639 in Hingham, Massachusetts. Anne was born on November 16, 1619, in Hingham, Norfolk, England and died in 1671 in Norwich, Connecticut. She was the daughter of Rev. Robert Peck, who was born at Beccles, Suffolk, England, in 1580. Peck was a talented and influential clergyman and Puritan who had fled his Hingham, Norfolk, England church after the crackdown by Archbishop Laud.

Matthew Grant included "Captain Masen" in his list of "some omitted in former records being gone yet had children born here", and credited him with four children born in Windsor. These would include the daughter Israel by his first wife, and then Priscilla (b. 1641), Samuel (b. 1644), and John (b. 1646) with second wife Anne.

Children born at Saybrook, Connecticut were Rachel (b. 1648), Ann (b. 1650), and Daniel (b. 1652); and then Elizabeth was born at Stonington, Connecticut, in 1654.

Mason's sons Samuel, John, and Daniel were also military officers and prominent civil servants. Many subsequent descendants served as military officers, doctors, lawyers, and reverends in America.

== Memorials ==
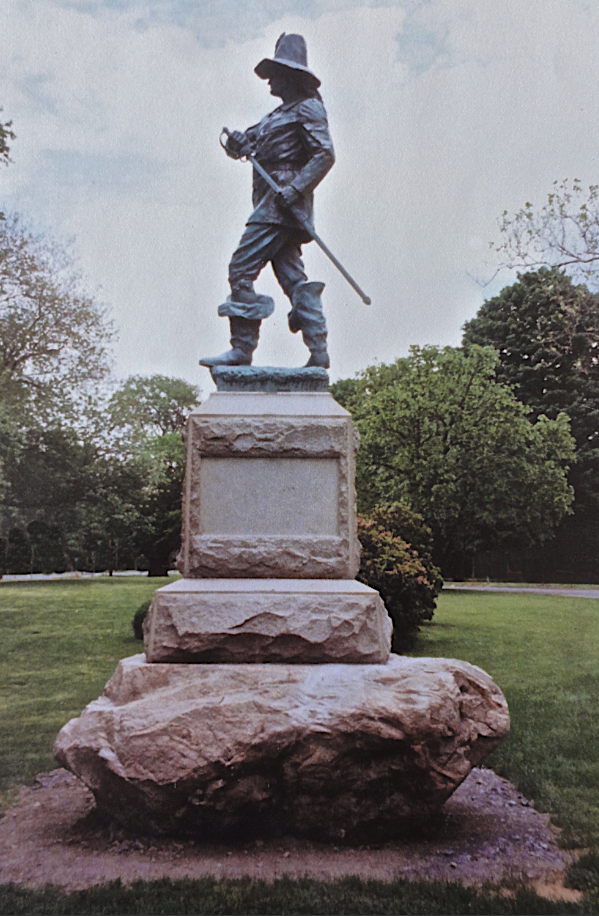
Mason Statue Windsor CT

After the Civil War, a statue movement was sweeping the nation, and local citizens and organizations were erecting monuments of heroes and patriots everywhere. The prominent citizens of Mystic, Connecticut, decided to create a larger than life bronze and granite monument of Major John Mason, the commander of the Colonial forces in the 1637 Pequot War, the very first declared and sustained conflict in the early colonies. In 1889, the John Mason statue, carved by sculptor James G. C. Hamilton, was placed at the intersection of Pequot Avenue and Clift Street in Mystic, near what was thought to be the location of the fortified Pequot village where the Mystic Massacre occurred.

After the Pequot War, the Colonial government declared the once dominant Pequot Tribe to be extinct, even though a few survivors and descendants continued to remain in their former territory. They were ignored, along with occasional complaints about the statue being on the sacred site where their ancestors perished. The statue remained there for 103 years, until the early 1990s when the modern-day Pequots managed to obtain federal recognition, at which point former and new complaints about the statue could no longer be ignored. Studying the sensitivity and appropriateness of the statue's location on a cultural "sacred site", a committee chartered by the Town of Groton, Connecticut, recommended that it be relocated.

In 1996, the State of Connecticut (DEP/Parks Dept.) decided to relocate the statue of Major John Mason to the Palisado Green in Windsor, Connecticut, at 41°51′29″N 72°38′11″W, which is where John Mason lived at the time of the war. The original plaque which glorified him for the war victory was removed and given to the Mystic River Historical Society and a new plaque replaced it, outlining the Major's entire career. This essentially re-birthed the statue to now represent John Mason in a more balanced and comprehensive manner for a lifetime of public service, including many prominent accomplishments as the principal founder of the Connecticut Colony.

- Commander of first American Naval task force against the pirate Dixie Bull 1633
- Lieutenant at Dorchester and Civil Engineer of initial fortifications at Castle Island in Boston Harbor, later known as Fort Independence, 1634
- Deputy for Dorchester to Massachusetts Bay Colony General Court, 1634–1635
- Captain and Commander of Colonial forces in the Pequot War 1637
- Deputy for Windsor to Connecticut Court, 1637–1641
- Assistant to the Connecticut Court, 1642–1659, 1669–71 [CT Civil List 35]
- Commander of Saybrook Fort 1647–1659.
- War committee for Saybrook, May 1653, October 1654
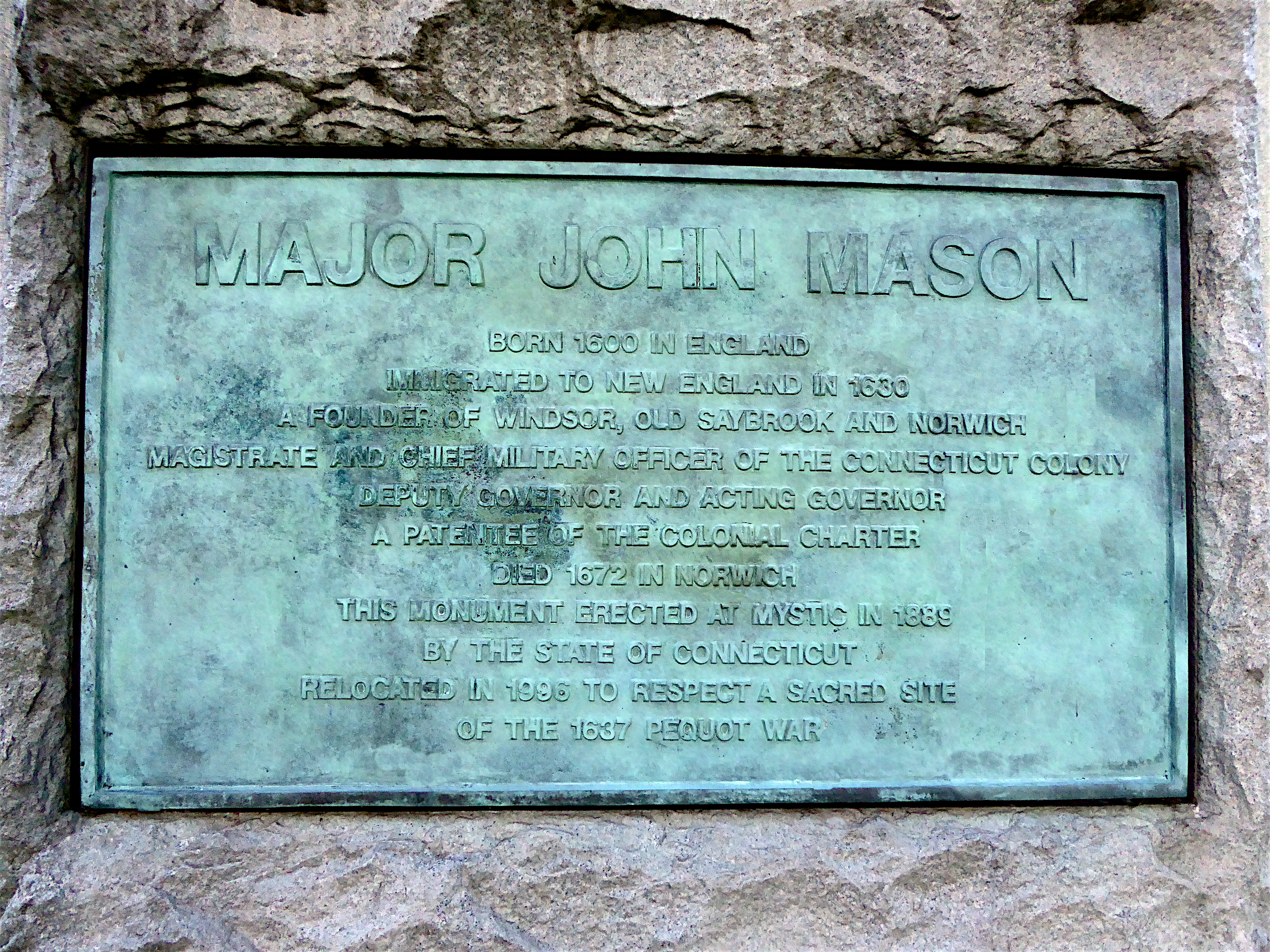
  Replacement plaque on the John Mason Statue in Windsor, Connecticut US
- Major General - chief military officer of the United Colonies 1654–1672
- Deputy Governor of Connecticut Colony, 1660–1668
- Acting Governor from 1661 to 1663, while Gov. John Winthrop Jr. went to London to obtain approval of the Charter from King Charles II
- Commissioner for United Colonies, June 1654, May 1655, May 1656, May 1657, May 1660, May 1661
- Patentee of the original Connecticut Constitution - Royal Charter, 1662
- Overseer (first Indian Agent) and Administrator of Mohegan Lands 1659–1672

In honor of Norwich's bicentennial in 1859, The Mason Monument Association was formed and money was donated to erect a Founders Monument in the original burial grounds at Bean Hill. Major John Mason was their leader and this monument is also referred to as the Mason Monument but includes the names of all the 38 original settlers.

== Estate ==
Coat of Arms of John Mason

On February 10, 1634 "Captayne Mason" received a grant of 2 acres (8,100 m^{2}) in Dorchester. He drew 6 acres (24,000 m^{2}) of meadow beyond Naponset in lot #73.

In the Windsor land inventory on February 28, 1640, John Mason held seven parcels, six of which were granted to him: "a home lot with some additions to it", 10 acres (40,000 m^{2}); "in the Palisado where his house stands and mead adjoining" 20.5 acres (83,000 m^{2}); "in the first mead on the north side of the rivulet, for mead and addition in swamp" 8 acres (32,000 m^{2}); "in the northwest field for upland" 8 acres (32,000 m^{2}) "with some addition on the bank side"; "over the Great River in breadth by the river twenty-six rods more or less, and continues that breadth to the east side of the west marsh, and there it is but sixteen rods in breadth and so continues to the end of the three miles"; 9 acres (36,000 m^{2}) "of land by Rocky Hill"; and "by a deed of exchange with Thomas Duy [Dewey] ... on the east side of the Great River in breadth eighteen rods more or less, in length three miles".

On January 5, 1641, Connecticut court ordered "that Captain Mason shall have 500 acres (2.0 km^{2}) of ground, for him and his heirs, about Pequot Country, and the dispose of 500 more acres to such soldiers as joined with him in the service when they conquered the Indians there".

On July 12, 1644, John Mason of Windsor sold to William Hosford of Windsor 8 acres (32,000 m^{2}) in a little meadow with addition of swamp.

On September 11, 1651 "the island commonly called Chippachauge in Mistick Bay is given to Capt. John Mason, and also 100 acres (0.40 km^{2}) of upland and 10 acres (40,000 m^{2}) of meadow near Mistick, where he shall make choice". Henceforth, this island became known as Mason's Island, situated at the mouth of the Mystic River in Stonington, Connecticut. It was owned by the Mason family from 1651 to 1913.

On March 14, 1660, the "jurisdiction power over that land that Uncas and Wawequa have made over to Major Mason is by him surrendered to this Colony. Nevertheless for the laying out of those lands to farms or plantations the Court doth leave it in the hands of Major Mason. It is also ordered and provided with the consent of Major Mason, that Uncus & Wawequa and their Indians and successors shall be supplied with sufficient planting ground at all times as the Court sees cause out of that land. And the Major doth reserve for himself a competence of land sufficient to make a farm".

On May 14, 1663, the court granted "unto the Major, our worshipful Deputy Governor, 500 acres (2.0 km^{2}) of land for a farm, where he shall choose it, if it may not be prejudicial to a plantation already set up or to set up, so there be not above 50 acres (200,000 m^{2}) of meadow in it". On 13 October 1664, the "Major propounding to the Court to take up his former grant of a farm, at a place by the Indians called Pomakuck, near Norwich, the Court grants liberty to him to take up his former grant in that place, upon the same terms as it was granted to him by the Court".

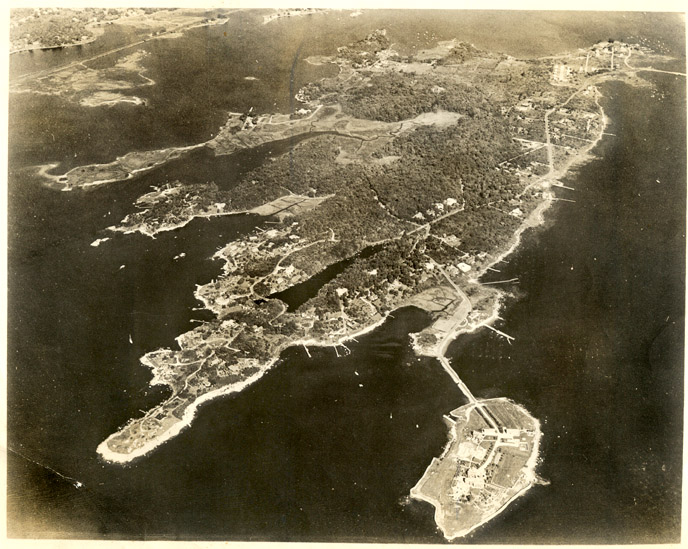
Masons Island circa 1950

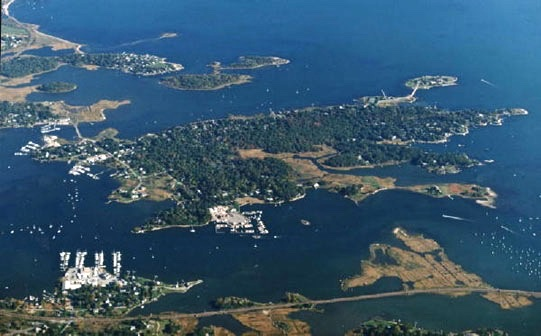
Masons Island Mystic aerial view

On May 20, 1668, the "Major desiring this Court to grant him a farm" of about 300 acres (1.2 km^{2}), for "one of his sons, his desire is hereby granted (provided there be not above 30 acres (120,000 m^{2}) of meadow) and Lt. Griswold & Ensign Tracy are hereby desired to lay it out to him in some convenient place near that tract of land granted Jer[emiah] Adams, it being the place the Major hath pitched upon, the name of the place is Uncupsitt, provided it prejudice no plantation or former grant".

On May 9, 1672 "Ensign Tracy is appointed to join with Sergeant Tho[mas] Leffingwell in laying out to the Major and Mr. Howkins their grants of land according to their grants".

== Descendants ==
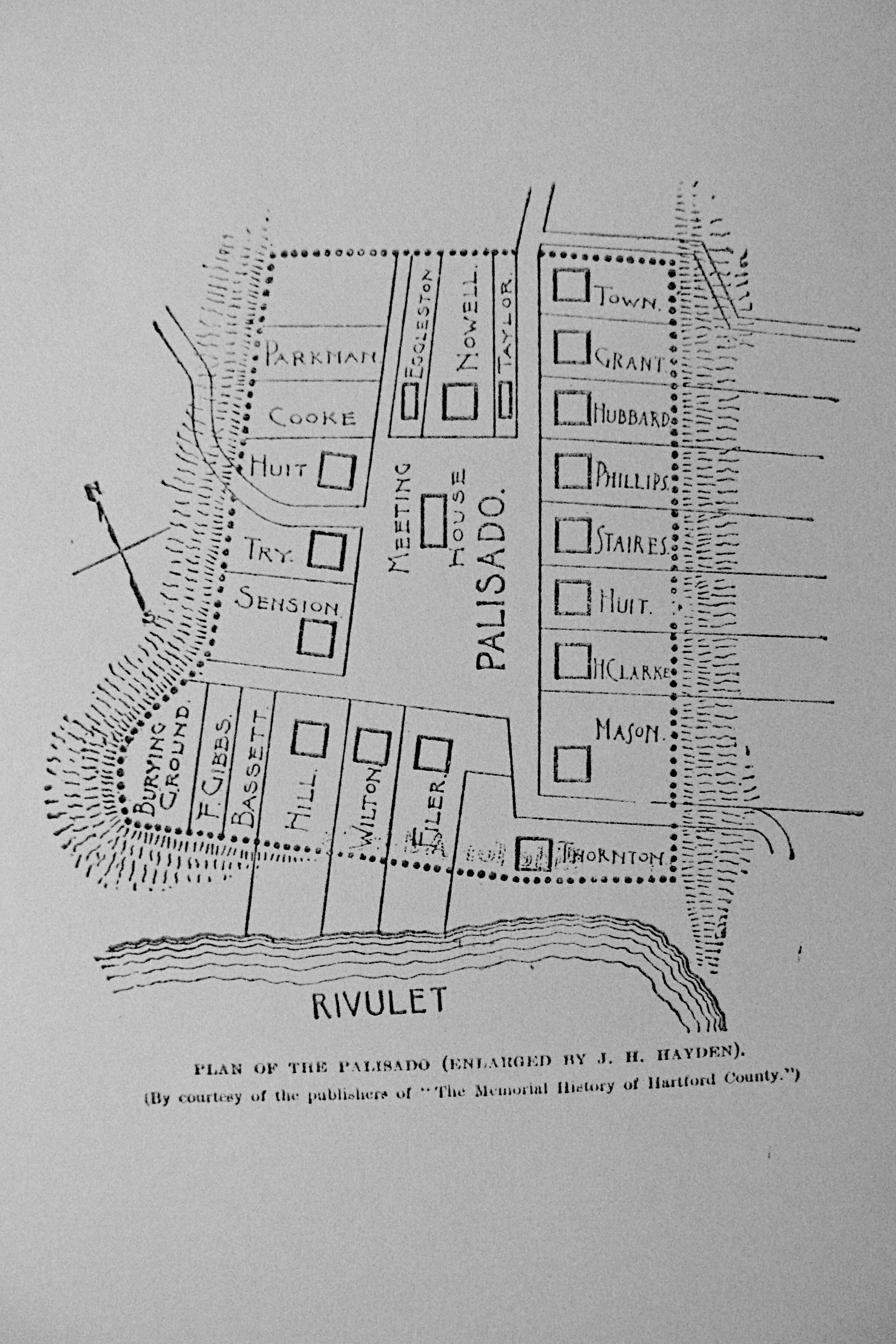
Windsor Palisado Plan

John Mason's descendants number in the thousands today. Some of his notable descendants include;

- David Brewster is an American journalist.
- Diane Brewster was an American television actress.
- Martha Wadsworth Brewster, (1710 – c. 1757) a poet and writer and one of the earliest American female literary figures.
- Catherine Drew Gilpin Faust (born September 18, 1947), is an American historian, college administrator, and the president of Harvard University.
- James Rudolph Garfield, (October 17, 1865 – March 24, 1950) was a U.S. politician, lawyer and son of President James Abram Garfield and First Lady Lucretia Garfield.
- Harry Augustus Garfield, (October 11, 1863 – December 12, 1942) was an American lawyer and academic. He was the eighth president of his alma mater, Williams College in Williamstown, Massachusetts.
- John Mason Kemper, was the 11th headmaster at Phillips Academy
- John Forbes Kerry, (born December 11, 1943) is the 68th Secretary of State of the United States and former senior United States senator from Massachusetts (served as chairman of the Senate Foreign Relations Committee).
- George Trumbull Ladd, was an American philosopher and psychologist.
- Brice Lalonde, is a former socialist and green party leader in France, who ran for President of France in the Presidential elections, 1981. In 1988 he was named Minister of the Environment, and in 1990 founded the Green Party Génération Ecologie.
- W. Patrick Lang. US Army officer, US Intelligence Executive, and author.
- Jeremiah Mason, was a United States senator from New Hampshire.
- John Sanford Mason, (August 21, 1824 – November 29, 1897) was a career officer in the United States Army who served as a general in the Union Army during the American Civil War.
- Robert Noyce, nicknamed "the Mayor of Silicon Valley", was an inventor of the integrated circuit or microchip.
- Robert Charles Winthrop, was an American lawyer and philanthropist and one time Speaker of the United States House of Representatives.

== See also ==
- Robert Seeley
- John Oldham
- Uncas
