= Fairfield Swamp Fight =

Battle during the Pequot War

The Great Swamp Fight
- Part of the Pequot War
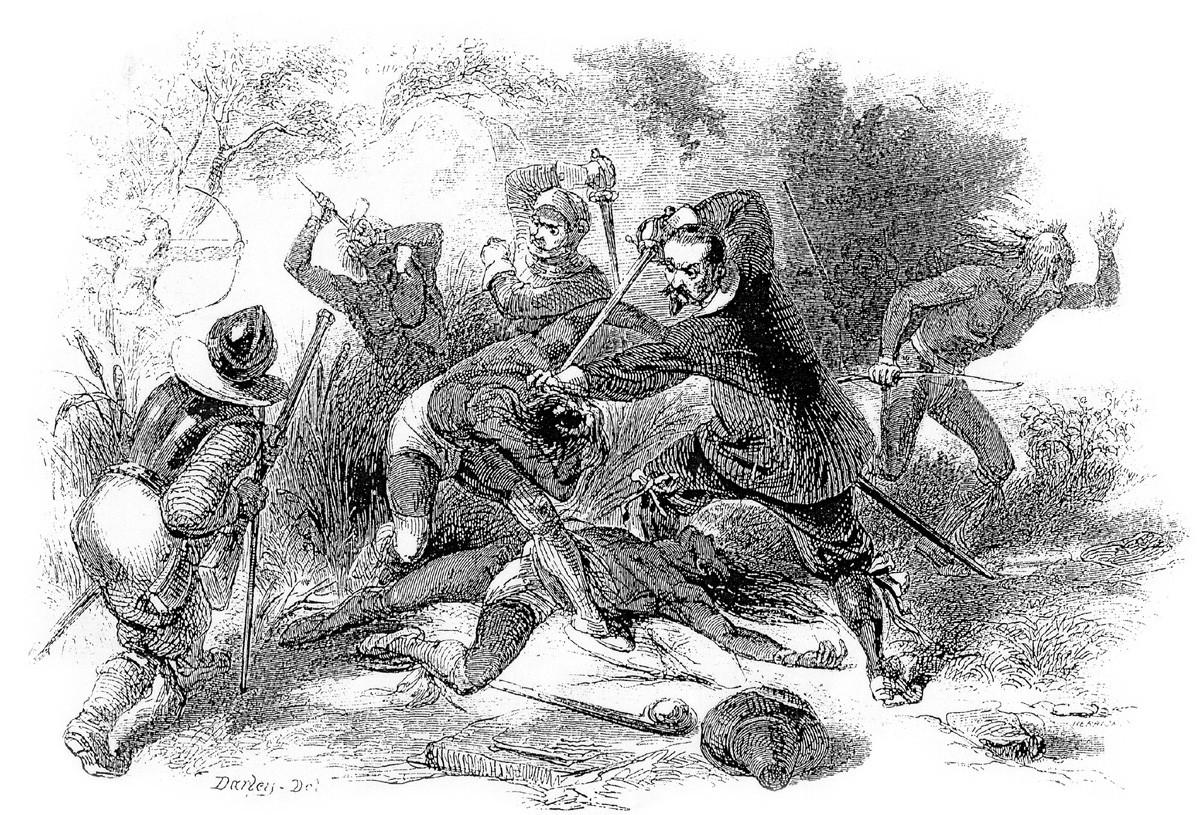
Date	July 13–14, 1637
Location	present-day Fairfield, Connecticut 41.13833°N 73.29028°W
Result	English victory and the disbanding of the Pequot tribe

Belligerents
Pequot people	English colonists

Commanders and leaders
Sassacus	Capt. Israel Stoughton; Capt. John Mason

Strength
100 warriors	120 under Stoughton

Casualties and losses
Nearly all Pequot warriors present	Several wounded, none killed
- Location within Connecticut

The Fairfield Swamp Fight (also known as the Great Swamp Fight) was the last engagement of the Pequot War and marked defeat of the Pequot tribe in the war and the loss of their recognition as a political entity in the 17th century. The participants in the conflict were the Pequot and the English with their allied tribes (the Mohegan and Narragansett). The Fairfield Swamp Fight occurred July 13–14, 1637 in what is present-day Fairfield, Connecticut. The town of Fairfield was founded after the battle in 1639.

== Before the battle ==
The English (and their Narragansett and Mohegan allies) drove the Pequot from their homes in the wake of the Mystic massacre in May 1637. Fleeing westward along the Connecticut coastline, the Pequot arrived in Sasqua Village, present-day Fairfield, where they sought refuge with the Sasquas Indians, a tribe of some 200 members.

The Hartford General Court dispatched Captain Israel Stoughton and his troops numbering some 120 soldiers to southern Connecticut, with the goal of ending the Pequot War and the capture of Sassacus, the Pequot chief sachem. As they moved westward, the English encountered stragglers from the band of Pequots and obtained intelligence about the whereabouts of Sassacus and his fellow tribesmen. As the English forces approached Sasqua Village, several Pequot on a hill just beyond the English revealed their position. Recognizing this, they attempted to flee. The English followed them to investigate. The compromised Pequots rushed up the hill, the English following. The Pequot sought refuge in a swamp, later named Sadque, and the English continued to search the abandoned village and encircle the swamp the Pequots had sought refuge in. Lieutenant Davenport attempted to force his way through, but a volley of arrows prevented his success.

== The battle ==
Among the participants in the battle were Captain John Mason, the man responsible for the massacre at Mystic, and Roger Ludlow, a statesman from Wethersfield. The combined English forces surrounded the swamp, firing rounds into the thickets. These acts were meant to force the Pequot into negotiations for the release of non-combatants.

=== Day 1 – July 13th ===
The English surrounded the Pequot warriors at a distance of roughly four yards apart from one another. Thomas Stanton, "a man well acquainted with Indian language and manners", was sent into the swamp to talk to the Indians. Stanton was able to negotiate a settlement with Sassacus for the release of some 180 elderly men, women and children who would surrender to the English. In addition to the Pequot non-combatants that were released, the Pequot hosts, the 200 Sasquas Indians were released as well. Roughly 100 Pequot warriors remained with Sassacus in the swamp. The remaining warriors refused to surrender. The fighting resumed and continued through the night. The English entered the swamp and systematically shot down the Pequot warriors, some of whom were later found drowned in the bottom of the swamp. The Pequot warriors held their location through the night until the fog rolled in the following morning.

=== Day 2 – July 14th ===
The English soldiers, Captain Patrick's forces specifically, had the clear advantage with their use of "small shot" during the engagement. The small shot was essentially multiple musket bullets fired at a single time. This was disabling to the Pequot forces. Initially, the Pequot warriors took advantage of the English and their slow advance. Sassacus and his warriors were able to exploit a weak point in Patrick’s perimeter. The Pequot at this point attempted to break the English perimeter on the offensive. This ability to break through the English perimeter led to Sassacus’ escape to the Mohawk territories of New York.

The casualties among the colonists were few. John Winthrop was quoted saying, "[the Pequot] coming up behind the bushes very near our men... shot many arrows into their hats, sleeves and stocks, yet (which was a very miracle) not one of ours was wounded." Mason's account supported this, saying that "several were found slain", a reference to them being injured.

== The aftermath ==
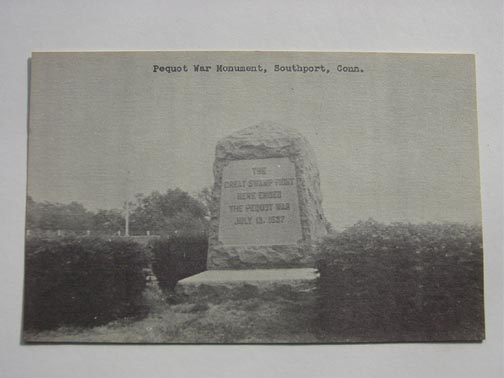
Fairfield Swamp Fight Monument

Most, if not all, of the Pequot warriors were killed during the engagement. The 180 Pequot non-combatants were taken captive and dispersed among the English and their allies. Many of the slaves taken prisoner did not remain in captivity for long because of their inability to adapt to their roles in servitude. Some of those captured were shipped off to the West Indies into the slave trade. The soldiers took Pequot wampum, some kettles and other items as spoils. In the ensuing weeks after the battle, the Mohawk Indians of New York tracked down Sassacus and the Pequot warriors accompanying him. The Mohawk murdered Sassacus, sending his head to Hartford as evidence of his capture.

On September 21, 1638, the Treaty of Hartford formally ended the war and eliminated the Pequot political and cultural identity. The survivors were not allowed to live on tribal lands, and any geographic locations bearing the name of the Pequot were changed. Among these were the Pequot River, renamed the Thames, and Pequot Village, which was renamed New London.

Roger Ludlow, one of the soldiers in the forces that fought the Pequot at the swamp fight, later petitioned the General Court to found a settlement on the same location and the surrounding lands. Being "charmed with the landscape", under his leadership, the plantation of Uncos was founded in 1639, later becoming the town of Fairfield.

== Battlefield preservation efforts ==
The Mashantucket Pequot Museum filed an application with the National Park Service American Battlefield Protection Program in January 2007 to develop a phased plan to research, protect, and preserve the sites involved in the Pequot War. Among these sites was the Fairfield Swamp area. Kevin McBride, an archaeologist and professor from the research center at the University of Connecticut, is leading the program.

Researchers from the Mashantucket Pequot Museum and Research Center were able to determine study and core areas from narrative accounts (those of Philip Vincent, John Mason, William Hubbard, Increase Mather and the John Winthrop Papers) as well as the Connecticut Colonial Records, local deeds and other records. Using non-invasive techniques, including the use of metal detectors, researchers were able to mark spots of interest to determine the origin of the artifacts. Much of the original swamp and surrounding areas have been impacted substantially through residential and commercial development. The construction of Interstate 95 resulted in the filling of approximately half of the entire swamp. As a result of this, many of the archaeological artifacts are thought to be lost.

Among the goals of the preservation efforts, the researchers hoped to find an exact location for the Pequot Swamp and the areas surrounding it. Once that land was found, they hoped to secure permission from local landowners to further survey the land. Among the initial findings of the report was new information about Pequot armaments. The armaments held by the Pequot are beginning to be reconsidered and among them are thought to be firearms and "Mohawk Hammers".

== Bibliography ==
- Chet, Guy. Conquering the American Wilderness: The Triumph of European Warfare in Colonial Northeast. Amherst: University of Massachusetts Press, 2003.
- Child, Frank Samuel. Fairfield: Ancient and Modern. Fairfield, CT: The Fairfield Historical Society, 1909.
- DeForest, John W. History of the Indians of Connecticut. 1850, reprint. Hamden, CT: The Shoe String Press, 1964.
- Fairfield Museum and Research Center. "The Great Swamp Fight". Explore Fairfield History. https://web.archive.org/web/20080723165035/http://www.fairfieldhs.org/explore-fairfield-history.php (accessed October 27, 2009)
- Katz, Steven T. "The Pequot War Revisited". The New England Quarterly 64, no. 2 (June 1991): 206–224.
- Mashantucket Pequot Museum and Research Center. "Pequot Swamp Fight Battlefield". American Battlefield Protection Program Grant. https://web.archive.org/web/20110606041502/http://www.pequotmuseum.org/uploaded_images/AC632AE0-2B69-4BA5-B4AF-AB9B3D601335/fairfieldlandholders.pdf (accessed October 27, 2009).
- Mason, John. A Brief History of the Pequot War (1736). Paul Royster, ed. pp. 1–33. In DigitalCommons, University of Nebraska-Lincoln, http://digitalcommons.unl.edu/etas/42, accessed 8/14/09.
- U.S. Department of the Interior. National Park Service. Battle of Mystic Fort Documentation Plan By Kevin McBride and David Naumec of the Mashantuck Pequot Museum and Research Center. Technical Report, American Battlefield Protection Plan, 2009.
