= The Pequot War =

The Pequot War applies to:

- Pequot war the Wikipedia article
- The Pequot War a nonfiction book by Alfred A. Cave

== See also ==
- The Pequot Press which redirects to Globe Pequot Press
- Pequots a Native American people of Connecticut
