= Robert Seeley =

- Born: 1602; Bluntisham, Huntingdonshire, England
- Died: 1668 (aged 65–66); New York, Province of New York, British America
- Occupations: landowner, second in command in Pequot War,
- Known for: Founder of Watertown, Massachusetts, Wethersfield, Connecticut, and New Haven, Connecticut
- Spouse: Mary[unknown]Heath-Mason
- Children: Nathaniel, (Possibly) Obadiah
- Parent(s): William Seely & Grace Prett

Robert Seeley, also Seely, Seelye, or Ciely, (1602–1668) was an early Puritan settler in the Massachusetts Bay Colony who helped establish Watertown, Wethersfield, and New Haven. He also served as second-in-command to John Mason in the Pequot War.

== Early life ==
Coat of Arms of Robert Seeley

Robert Seeley was born in Bluntisham-cum-Earith, Huntingdonshire, England in 1602. His father William was a joiner (cabinet maker) . In 1623 Robert moved to London, where he became an apprentice cordwainer (shoemaker). He married Mary (unknown maiden name) Heath Mason, widow of William Heath, widow of Walter Mason, in 1626 and began attending the church of the Puritan minister John Davenport that same year. Robert and Mary had one son Nathaniel 16 September 1627, baptized at St Stephen's Parish, Coleman Street, London.

== The Great Migration ==
In 1630 Robert, Mary and Nathaniel sailed with John Winthrop as a part of the original Puritan expedition to Massachusetts. Soon after arriving in the New World, Seeley became one of the original forty settlers of Watertown, one of Massachusetts' earliest Puritan communities. He employed his training in surveying by laying out many of the plots for the settlers. He was granted freeman status in 1631.

== Wethersfield and the Pequot War ==
In 1633 or 1634, Seeley joined a ten-man expedition led by John Oldham to the Connecticut River. The group soon established Wethersfield, the first English settlement on the Connecticut River. Oldham's death in 1636, presumed by the colonists to be at the hands of the Pequot, helped touch off the Pequot War in 1637. Seeley served as second-in-command to Captain John Mason in the war. He was severely wounded by an arrow to the head in an attack on a Pequot fort along the Mystic River. Captain Mason, who called Seeley a "valiant soldier", wrote of the incident, "Lieutenant Seeley was shot in the eyebrow with a flat headed Arrow, the Point turning downwards. I pulled out the arrow myself." Seeley carried a permanent scar from the wound.

== New Haven ==
1832 map of New Haven by J.W. Barber

When his old friend John Davenport arrived in Massachusetts, Seeley joined his group and helped establish the New Haven Colony in 1638. Seeley served as New Haven's first town marshal and lieutenant of the militia. He was generally known in the community as Lieutenant Seeley. He also participated in Theophilus Eaton's exploratory expedition in Long Island Sound.

== Later life ==
In 1659 Seeley briefly returned to England, living there until 1662 when he returned to the New World and settled in New Amsterdam (present-day Huntington, New York) on Long Island. He married second Mary Manning Walker December 22, 1666 in New York City. He died in New York City in 1668. In 1695 his heirs received 40 acres (160,000 m^{2}) of land in Watertown, resolving a suit which Seeley had filed 60 years earlier after settling in Wethersfield. In the suit he had claimed that he had not been given the area promised to the original settlers of Watertown. Seeley's son Nathaniel was killed in the build-up to the Great Swamp Fight 1675.

== Honors ==
- Robert Seeley's name is featured on three historic plaques listing town founders, in Watertown, Wethersfield, and New Haven.
- He is listed on a historic plaque at the base of a statue honoring John Mason as one who helped achieve victory for the colonists over the Pequot.

== See also ==
- Great Migration (Puritan)
- New Haven, Connecticut
- 10 Days that Unexpectedly Changed America

== Sources ==
- A Brief History of the Pequot War by Major John Mason, with an Introduction by the Rev. Thomas Prince (Kneeland and Green, Boston, 1736)
- "The English Life of Robert Seely" by Ralph M. Seely in The New England Historical and Genealogical Register (July 1962)
- Huntingdon Town Records, Vol. 1 by Charles R. Street (1887)
- "The Pequot War," http://www.colonialwarsct.org/1637.htm, from The Society of Wars in the State of Connecticut website
- The Public Records of Connecticut, Vol. 1 by J. Hammond Trumball (1850)
- Records of the Colony and Plantation of New Haven from 1638-1649 by Charles J. Hoady
- Seely History by Montell Seely and Kathryn Seely (Community Press, 1988)
- Watertown Records by the Watertown Historical Society (1894)

Scott, C. S. (2012). The Eel Catcher's Travels: Robert Seeley, 1602-1667. Carol Seeley Scott.
