= Pequot Fort =

- U.S. National Register of Historic Places
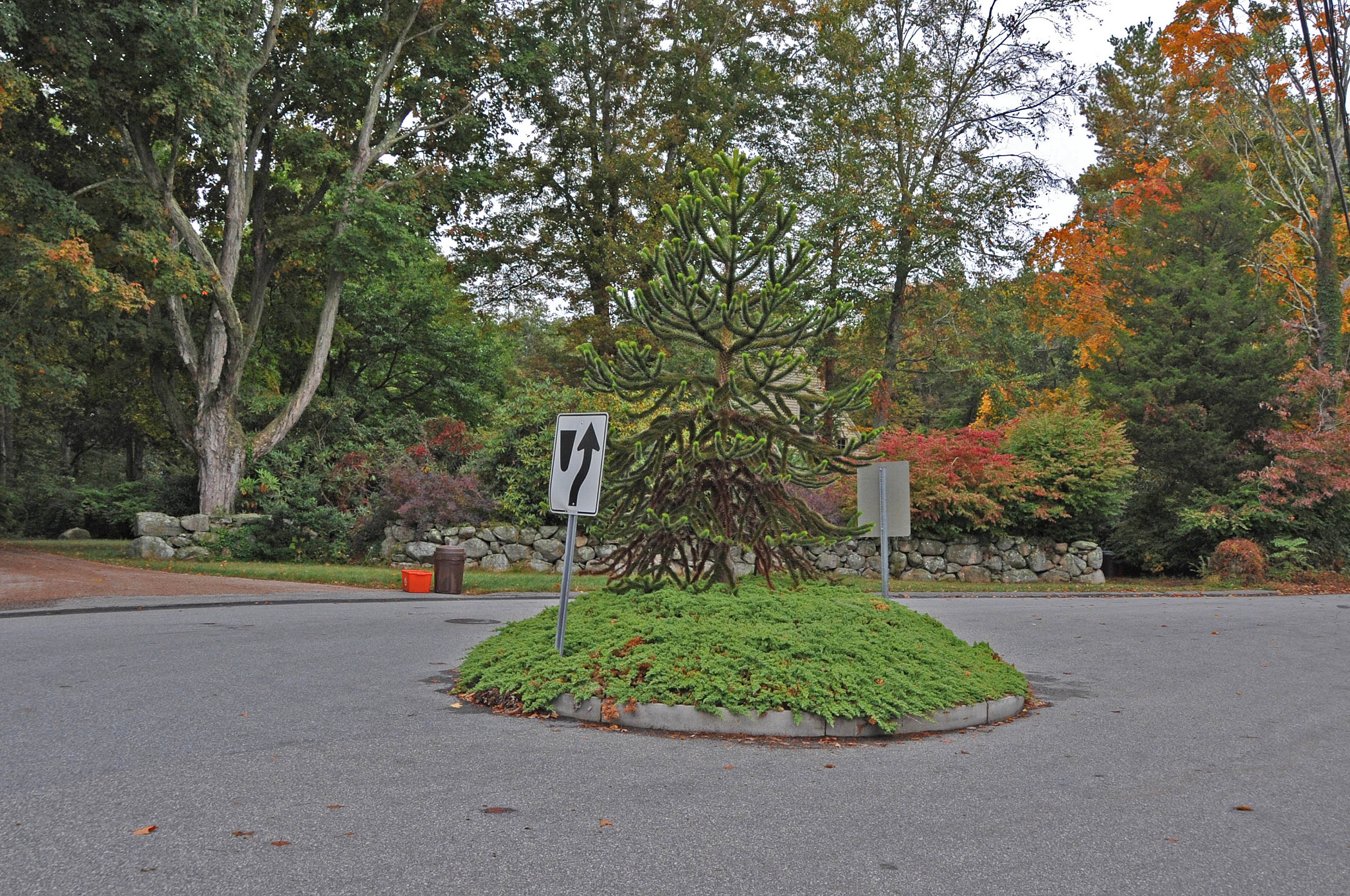

- Location within Connecticut Location within the United States
- Location: Pequot Avenue, Groton, Connecticut
- Coordinates: 41°21′35″N 71°58′36″W
- Area: 3 acres (1.2 ha)
- Built: 1637
- NRHP reference No.: 89002294
- Added to NRHP: January 19, 1990

The Pequot Fort was a fortified village on the Groton side of Mystic, Connecticut, located atop a ridge overlooking the Mystic River. It was a palisaded settlement of the Pequot Indian tribe until its destruction by forces from Connecticut Colony and the Mohegan Tribe during the Pequot War. The exact location of its archaeological remains is not certain, but it is commemorated by a small memorial at Pequot Avenue and Clift Street. The site previously included a statue of Major John Mason, who led the forces that destroyed the fort; it was removed in 1995 after protests by Pequot tribal members. The archaeological site was added to the National Register of Historic Places in 1990.

== Description ==
The fort was located on top of Pequot Hill along Pequot Avenue just north of the village of West Mystic. In the early 17th century, the Pequot were the largest and politically dominant tribe in what is now eastern Connecticut. Tensions rose in the 1630s over a variety of disputes between the Pequots and their neighbors, including the Narragansett to the east and the Mohegan to the north along with nearby English settlers of the Connecticut and Saybrook colonies and the Dutch colony of New Netherland. The Pequot War broke out in 1636 after English trader John Oldham was found murdered on his boat near Block Island. The Pequots were accused of sheltering the murderers, and one of their villages was burned by a Massachusetts Bay Colony force led by John Endecott. The Pequots responded by launching attacks on Saybrook and other Connecticut communities. In response, Captain John Mason led 90 colonists and 100 Mohegan warriors, augmented by a band of Narragansetts, against the Pequot fort at Mystic. Mason's force attacked the fort on May 26, 1637, burning it and killing between 400 and 700 people in what became known the Mystic massacre.

In 1889, a statue of Mason designed by James C. G. Hamilton was installed on Pequot Hill near the site where the massacre occurred. The memorial included a plaque describing Mason's role in leading the attack on the fort. In the early 1990s, members of the Pequot tribe petitioned for the statue's removal, citing offense at the commemoration of Mason and his role in massacre, and that its location was on grounds which they considered sacred. The statue was subsequently moved to Windsor, Connecticut in 1996.

== Archaeological site ==
Archaeological investigation of the summit area of Pequot Hill has yielded numerous American Indian and early colonial artifacts, with features that are interpreted as a palisaded village. The finds are consistent with post-destruction documentation of the site from the 17th to 19th centuries.

== See also ==
- National Register of Historic Places listings in New London County, Connecticut
