= Pequod =

Pequod or Pequot may refer to:

- The Pequod, or Pequot, a Native American people of Connecticut
- Pequod (Moby-Dick), a whaleship that appears in Herman Melville's 1851 novel Moby-Dick
- Pequod Glacier
- Pequod Mountain, in British Columbia, Canada
- In Limbus Company, Ahab's Crew is referred to as "The Pequod," in reference to Moby-Dick.
- In Metal Gear Solid V: The Phantom Pain, helicopter pilots use the callsign Pequod, in reference to Moby-Dick

== See also ==
- Pequot (disambiguation)
