= The Pequot War (book) =

1996 book by Alfred A. Cave

- Book jacket
- Author: Alfred A. Cave
- Genre: History
- Published: 1996
- Publisher: University of Massachusetts Press
- Publication place: United States
- Media type: Print, E-book, Audio
- Pages: 219
- ISBN: 9781558490291
- OCLC: 33405267
- Website: Official website

The Pequot War is a nonfiction book that reexamines historical sources on the Pequot War that resulted in new interpretations when this work was published in 1996. It was written by Alfred A. Cave and published by the University of Massachusetts Press. Also, this book is part of this university's series entitled: Native Americans of the Northeast.

== Synopsis ==
Cave challenges previous historical conclusions that the Euro-American Puritans were only motivated by the desire to advance self-interest through material gains in brutally executing the Pequot War. These were material gains such as "greed for Pequot land, wampum, [animal pelts], and slaves." Rather, Cave argues that Puritans viewed the Pequots as untrustworthy savages and as a dangerous threat. These feelings led to a war with the Native Americans. Also, it did result in the Puritans and two other Native nations taking control of former Pequot lands and their resources, as well as disenfranchising the Pequot as a recognized sovereign entity.

The author's analysis posits that Pequot aggression was not the primary factor leading to the conflict. To demonstrate this view, Cave emphasizes the Pequots' weakened position due to trade competition, loss of allies like the Mohegans who sided with the English, and the arrival of disease, which had reached the interior of New England. Additionally, Cave argues that Puritan ideology, particularly the view of Indians as agents of evil, played a significant role in setting the stage for war, rather than solely land and trade interests.

Puritan religious beliefs influenced the Puritan's understanding of events, and may have led to misinterpretations that cast the Pequots as the aggressors. Cave attempts to achieve a balanced view. He compares Pequot actions and motives with Puritan belief systems. However, he does not excuse the colonists' responsibility for the violence committed under the guise of religion. The attack on Fort Mystic, a brutal event that resulted in the deaths of many Pequot women, children and the elderly, is described by Cave as "an act of terrorism".
