= Mashantucket Pequot Museum and Research Center =

Museum of Native American culture in Connecticut

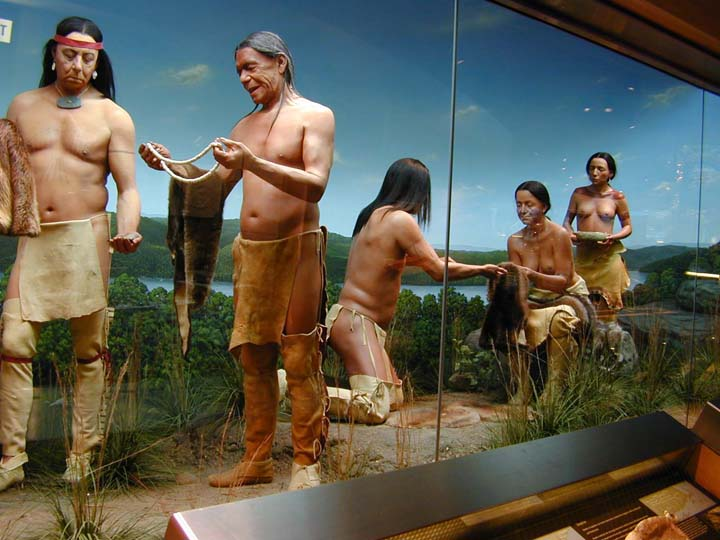
- Diorama in the museum
- Established: August 11, 1998
- Location: Mashantucket Pequot Tribal Nation, Connecticut, United States
- Coordinates: 41.46611°N 71.96278°W
- Website: pequotmuseum.org

The Mashantucket Pequot Museum and Research Center is a museum of Native American culture in Mashantucket, Connecticut, owned and operated by the Mashantucket Pequot Tribal Nation.

== Overview ==
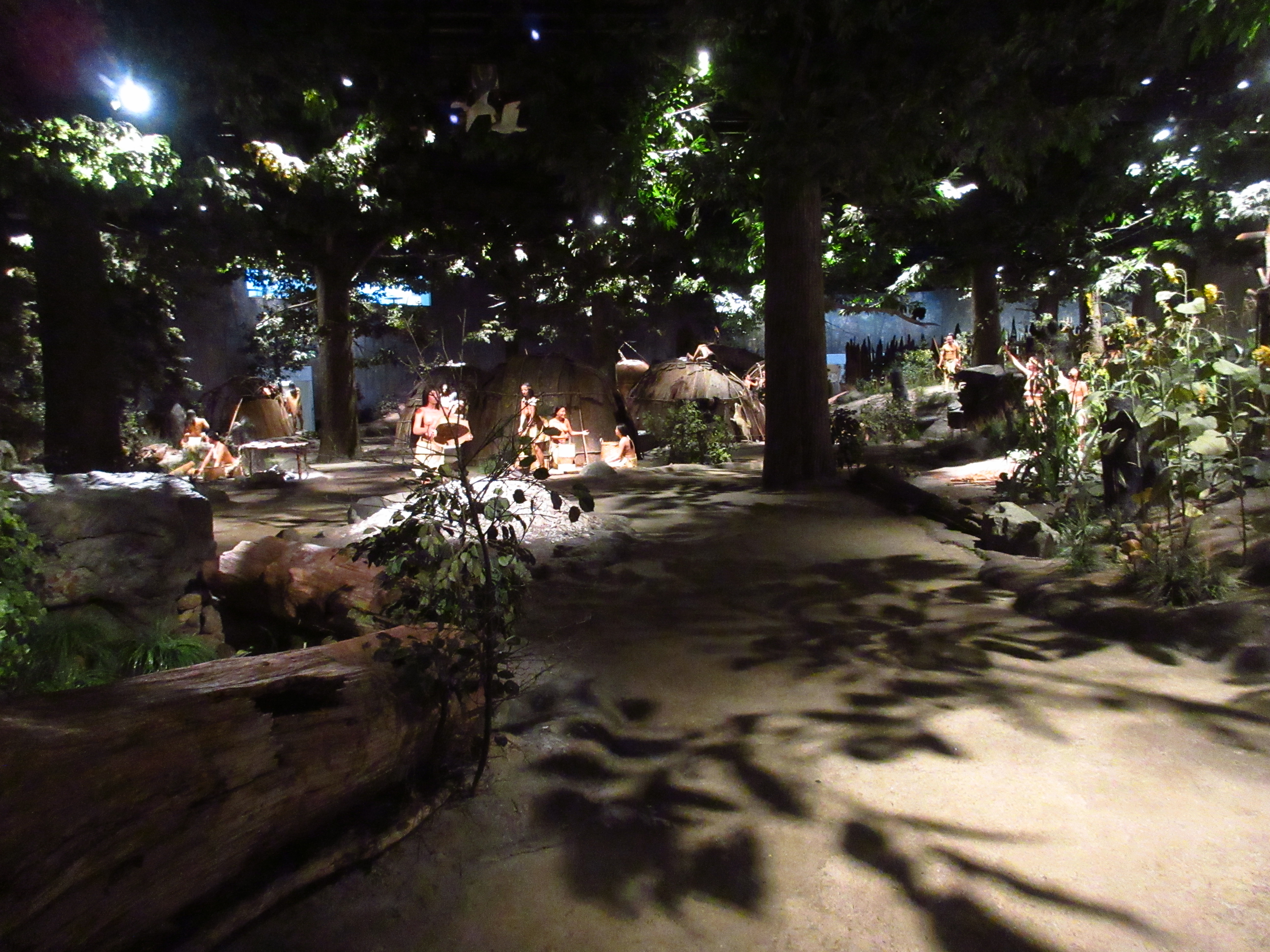
The diorama of a traditional village is largest exhibit in the museum.

The Mashantucket Pequot Museum and Research Center, located near the tribe's Foxwoods Resort Casino, opened August 11, 1998. The 308,000 ft^{2} (28,600 m^{2}) facility was built at a cost of $193.4 million, largely funded by casino revenues. It includes a museum and resources for scholarly research on the histories and cultures of the native peoples of the United States and Canada.

== Museum exhibits ==
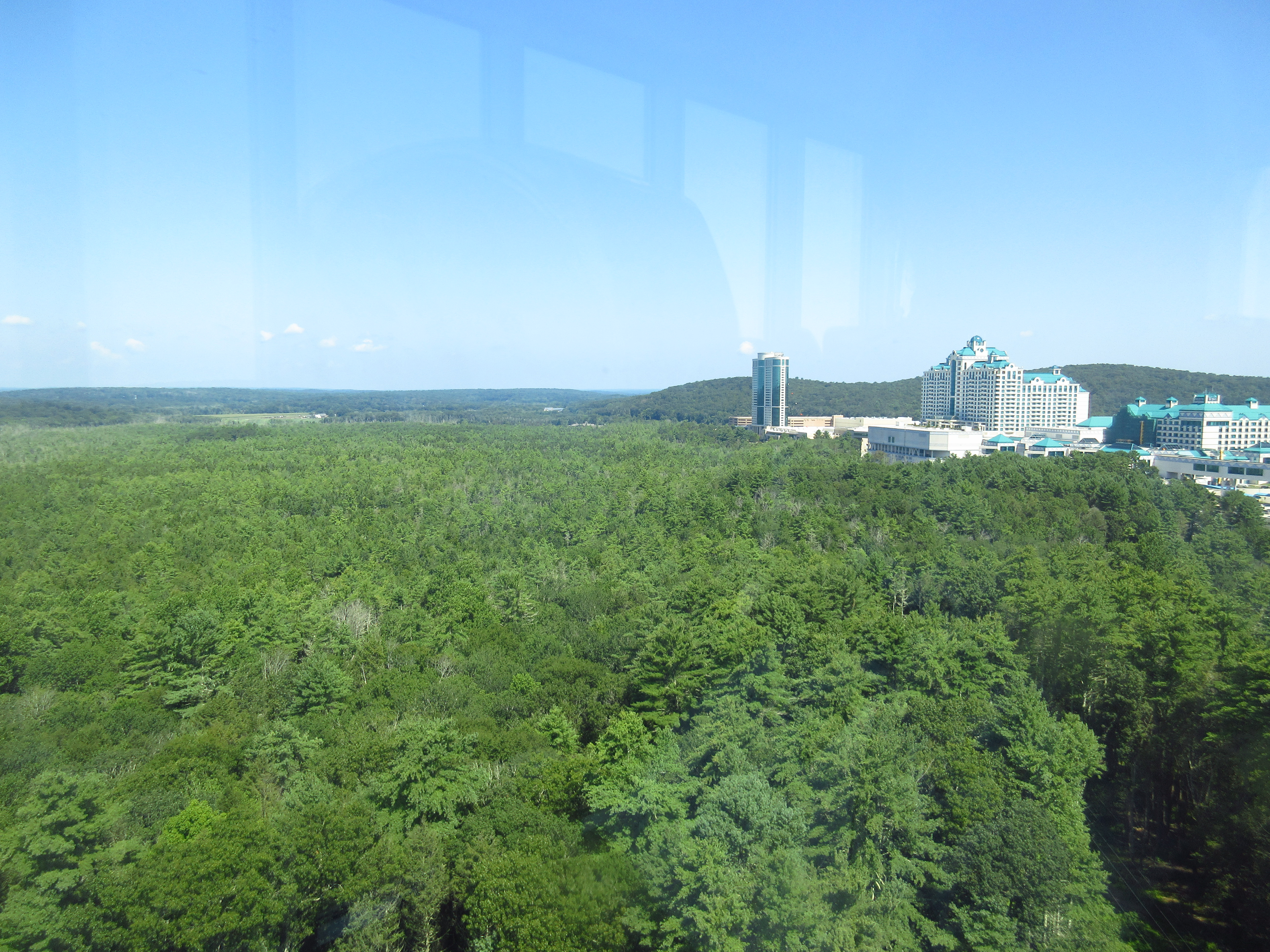
View of the casino and hotel from the observatory at the museum

The museum's permanent collection includes artifacts of Native American peoples of eastern North America from the 16th century to the 20th century, as well as commissioned art works and traditional crafts by modern Native Americans. A series of interactive exhibits and life-size three-dimensional dioramas depicts the lifeways and history of the Mashantucket Pequot and their ancestors from the last glacial period through modern times. One highlight is a 22,000 ft^{2} (2,000 m^{2}) walk-through re-creation of a coastal Pequot village around the year 1550, shortly before the first contact with Europeans. The village is populated by 51 life-size figures of Pequot individuals engaged in activities such as building wigwams, sharpening arrows, and weaving mats. A 600 ft (180 m) photomural of an oak-hickory forest surrounds the village.

A 185 ft (56 m) observation tower allows visitors to view the Mashantucket Pequot reservation, the casino, and surrounding areas of southeastern Connecticut.

The museum reports having about 250,000 visitors each year. A reviewer for Connecticut Magazine described the museum as "rival[ing] anything in the nation" and commented that the Pequot village reconstruction and other dioramas "almost put EPCOT to shame".

== Facility ==
The glass and steel building complex that houses the museum and research center was designed by New York City architects Polshek and Partners. The building design is intended to blend and merge with the surrounding natural landscape. A circular building, the Gathering Space, forms the focal center of the complex and serves as its main entry. Elements of the design are based on the plan of the Pequot fort at Mystic, Connecticut, that played an important role in the tribe's history. The complex received several awards for design and construction, including:

- American Architecture Award, Chicago Athenaeum, 1998
- Best of 1998 Award, New York Construction News
- Merit Award, American Institute of Architects (AIA) New York state, 1999
- Merit Award, AIA New England Regional Design Awards Program, 1999
- Innovative Design and Excellence in Architecture with Steel Award, AIA and American Institute of Steel Construction, 1999
- Honor Award, AIA Connecticut, 2000
- AIA National Award for Architecture, 2000
- New York Association of Consulting Engineers Platinum Award for Excellence in Structural Design, 2000
- Merit Winner, Engineering Awards of Excellence, 2000

In 2006, the museum building's green roof, which covers 65,000 ft^{2} (6,000 m^{2}), was recognized with a Green Roof Award of Excellence.
