= Treaty of Hartford (1638) =

1638 treaty between New England, the Mohegan and the Narragansett

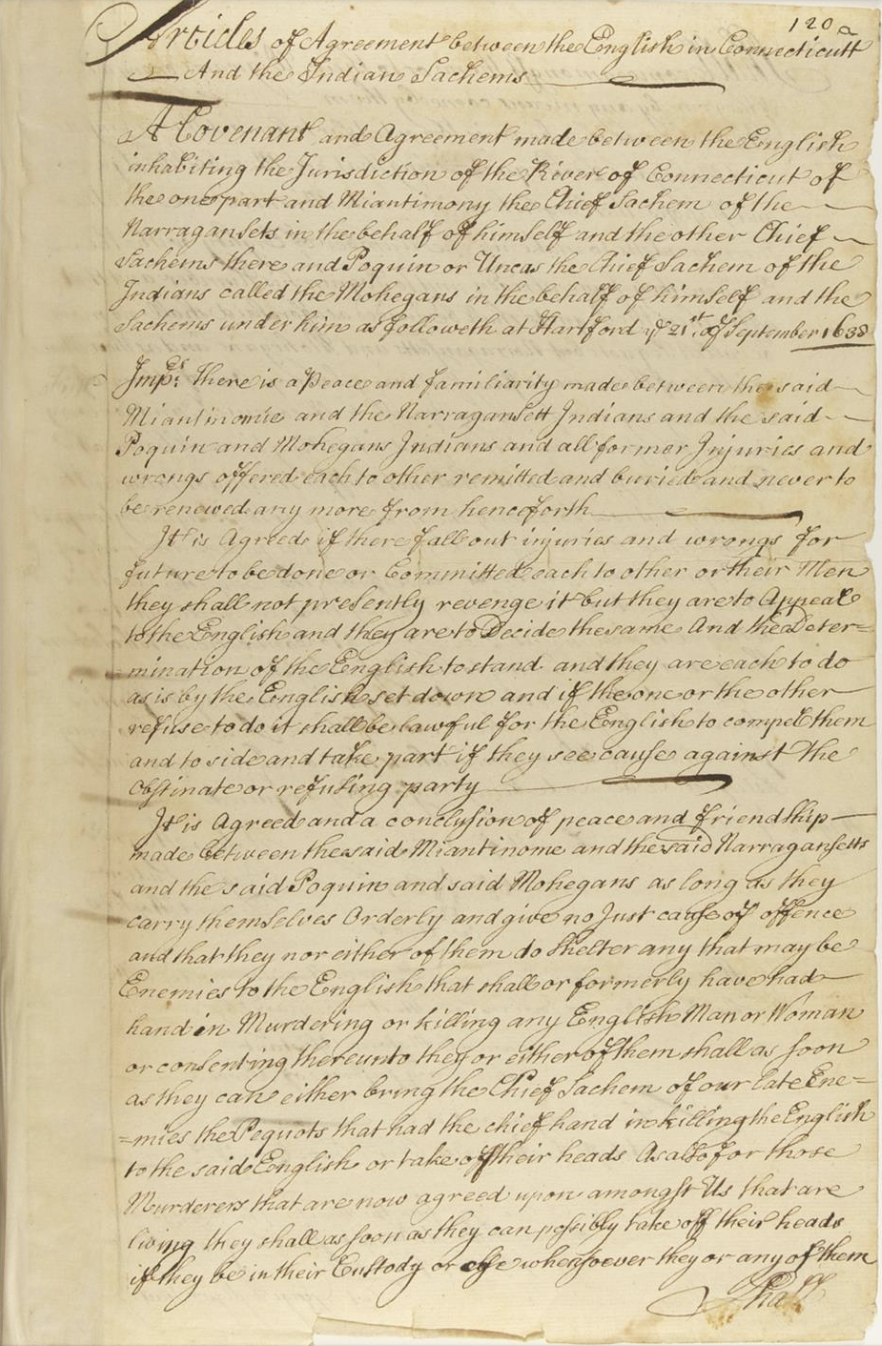
A 1743 copy of the Treaty of Hartford of 1638, which sought to eradicate the Pequot cultural identity by prohibiting the Pequots from returning to their lands, speaking their tribal language, or referring to themselves as Pequots.

The Treaty of Hartford was a treaty concluded between English colonists in Connecticut, the Mohegan nation and the Narragansett nation on September 21, 1638, following the Pequot War, in Hartford, Connecticut. It sought to eradicate the Pequot cultural identity by prohibiting the Pequots from returning to their lands, speaking their tribal language, or referring to themselves as Pequots.

== Background ==
The Pequot War of 1636 and 1637 saw the virtual elimination of the Pequot Indians. The victors, English colonists living along the Connecticut River and their Mohegan and Narragansett allies, met to decide on the division of the fruits of victory.

== The Treaty ==
The Mohegan and Narragansett tribes and the three English settlements in New England that would become the Connecticut River Colony in 1639, participated in the treaty. Surviving Pequot prisoners were divided between the tribes, with an unspecified number of captives being kept by the New England colonists; each tribe received 80 captives, with 20 captives being awarded to Ninigret, a sachem of the Eastern Niantic who were allied with the Narragansett.

The Pequot lands went to the Connecticut River towns. The other major feature of this treaty was to outlaw the Pequot name. Any survivors would be referred to in the future as Mohegans or Narragansett. No Pequot town or settlement would be allowed. This treaty was signed on September 21, 1638.

The Massachusetts Bay Colony, which had also participated in the anti-Pequot alliance, was not a party to the Treaty of Hartford. This led to a dispute between Massachusetts and Connecticut, with the Bay colony insisting that the Treaty of Hartford usurped its rights over Pequot lands under previous agreements with the Narragansetts and the Mohegans.

== Present day debate ==
In 2025, Connecticut State Senator Cathy Osten proposed a resolution to condemn the 1638 treaty, supported by testimony from Latoya Cluff, vice chair of the Mashantucket Pequots Tribal Council.

In March 2025, the Government Administration and Elections Committee voted 14–5 to approve the measure, sending it to the state Senate.

This follows a failed effort four years earlier to remove John Mason's sculpture from the State Capitol building.
