= Sassacus =

Pequot sachem (c. 1560 – June 1637)

Pequot leader
- In office 1632 – June 1637
- Preceded by: Tatobem

Personal details
- Born: c. 1560
- Died: June 1637 (aged 76–77) Present-Day New York
- Cause of death: Murdered by the Mohawk Tribe

Military service
- Battles/wars: Pequot War; Fairfield Swamp Fight

Sassacus is also a genus of jumping spiders.

Sassacus (Massachusett: Sassakusu, "fierce") (c. 1560 – June 1637) was a Pequot sachem who was born near present-day Groton, Connecticut. He became grand sachem after his father, Tatobem, was killed in 1632. The Mohegans led by sachem Uncas rebelled against domination by the Pequots. Sassacus and the Pequots were defeated by English colonists allied with the Narragansett and Mohegans in the Pequot War.

Sassacus fled to what he thought was safety among the Iroquois Mohawks in present-day New York state, but they murdered him and then sent his head and hands to the Connecticut Colony as a symbolic offering of friendship.

Sassacus possibly had a brother who married Ninigret's daughter, and his sister-in-law may have married Harman Garrett.
