= 10 Days That Unexpectedly Changed America =

2006 US documentary television series

- Genre: Documentary
- Written by: Steven Gillon
- Country of origin: United States
- Original language: English
- No. of seasons: 1
- No. of episodes: 10

Production
- Running time: 60 minutes
- Production company: History Channel

Original release
- Network: History Channel
- Release: April 9 – April 14, 2006

10 Days That Unexpectedly Changed America is a ten-hour, ten-part television miniseries that aired on the History Channel from April 9 through April 14, 2006. The material was later adapted and published as a book by the same title.

== Overview ==
The ten days featured in the series, in chronological order. The book and television series take different approaches to analyzing these events.

== List of episodes ==
Episode number	Event	Date of Event
1	The Mystic Massacre of the Pequot War	May 26, 1637
2	Shays' Rebellion in Western Massachusetts led by Daniel Shays	January 25, 1787
3	The beginning of the California Gold Rush when people were moving from East to West	January 24, 1848
4	The Battle of Antietam during the American Civil War	September 17, 1862
5	The Homestead Strike in Homestead, Pennsylvania	July 6, 1892
6	The assassination of President William McKinley	September 6, 1901
7	The Scopes trial about teaching evolution in the schools of Dayton, Tennessee	July 21, 1925
8	Albert Einstein signs a letter to President Franklin D. Roosevelt urging him to explore nuclear weapons	July 16, 1939
9	Elvis Presley appears on The Ed Sullivan Show	September 9, 1956
10	Civil rights workers James Chaney, Andrew Goodman, and Michael Schwerner are murdered in Philadelphia, Mississippi	June 21, 1964
