= Pequot War =

1630s conflict in New England

- Part of the American Indian Wars and European colonization of the Americas
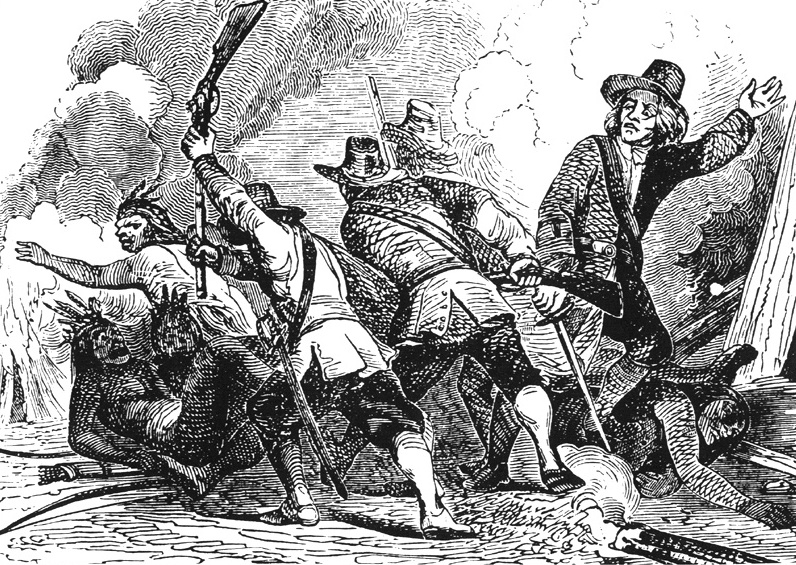
- A 19th-century engraving depicting an incident in the Pequot War
Date	July 1636 – September 1638
Location	New England Colonies
Result	English victory; Pequot defeat; Treaty of Hartford (1638)

Belligerents
Pequot tribe Western Niantic people	Massachusetts Bay Colony; Plymouth Colony; Saybrook Colony; Connecticut Colony; Narragansett; Mohegans

Commanders and leaders
Pequot: Sassacus (executed); Western Niantic: Sassious	Massachusetts Bay: Henry Vane; John Winthrop; John Underhill; John Endecott; Nathaniel Turner; Plymouth: Edward Winslow; William Bradford; Myles Standish; Connecticut: Thomas Hooker; John Mason; Robert Seeley; American Indian allies: Uncas; Wequash Cooke; Miantonomoh

The Pequot War was a conflict that took place in 1636 and ended in 1638 in New England, between the Pequot nation and a joint effort of the English colonists from the Massachusetts Bay, Plymouth, and Saybrook colonies and their allies from the Narragansett and Mohegan nations. The war concluded with the decisive defeat of the Pequot. In an event called the Mystic massacre, English colonists of the Connecticut Colony and their allies set the village of Pequot Fort ablaze, blocked the exits, and shot anyone trying to escape. By the end of the war, about 700 Pequots had been killed or taken into captivity.

Hundreds of Pequot prisoners were enslaved. While some of the enslaved persons were kept in the colonies of the region, they were generally deemed unfit as slaves and less desirable than enslaved people of African origin. Because of this, most of the enslaved Pequots were eventually sold to colonists in Bermuda or the West Indies, while a minority of the original numbers remained in the region. Other survivors were dispersed as captives to the Narragansett and Mohegan nations.

The Treaty of Hartford of 1638 sought to eradicate the Pequot cultural identity by prohibiting the Pequots from returning to their lands, speaking their tribal language, or referring to themselves as Pequots. The result was the elimination of the Pequot nation as a viable polity in southern New England, and the English colonial authorities classified them as extinct. Survivors who remained in the area were absorbed into other local nations; however, a western band retained sovereignty in Connecticut and are today a Federally recognized tribal nation.

== Origin ==
The Pequot and the Mohegan people were at one time a single sociopolitical entity. Anthropologists and historians contend that they split into the two competing groups sometime before contact with the Puritan English colonists. The earliest historians of the Pequot War speculated that the Pequot people migrated from the upper Hudson River Valley toward central and eastern Connecticut sometime around 1500. These claims are disputed by the evidence of modern archaeology and anthropology finds.

In the 1630s, the Connecticut River Valley was in turmoil. The Pequot aggressively extended their area of control at the expense of the Wampanoag to the north, the Narragansett to the east, the Connecticut River Valley Algonquian nations and the Mohegan to the west, and the Lenape Algonquian people of Long Island to the south. The nations contended for political dominance and control of the European fur trade. A series of epidemics over the course of the previous three decades had severely reduced the American Indian populations, and there was a power vacuum in the area as a result.

The Dutch and the English from Western Europe were also striving to extend the reach of their trade into the North American interior to achieve dominance in the lush, fertile region. The European colonies of the two were new at the time, as the original settlements had been founded in the 1620s. By 1636, the Dutch had fortified their trading post, and the English had built a trading fort at Saybrook. English Puritans from the Massachusetts Bay, along with the Pilgrims from Plymouth Colony, settled at the recently established river towns of Windsor (1632), Wethersfield (1633), Hartford (1635), and Springfield (1636). The Pilgrims had been allied with the Wampanoag since 1621.

== Causes for war ==
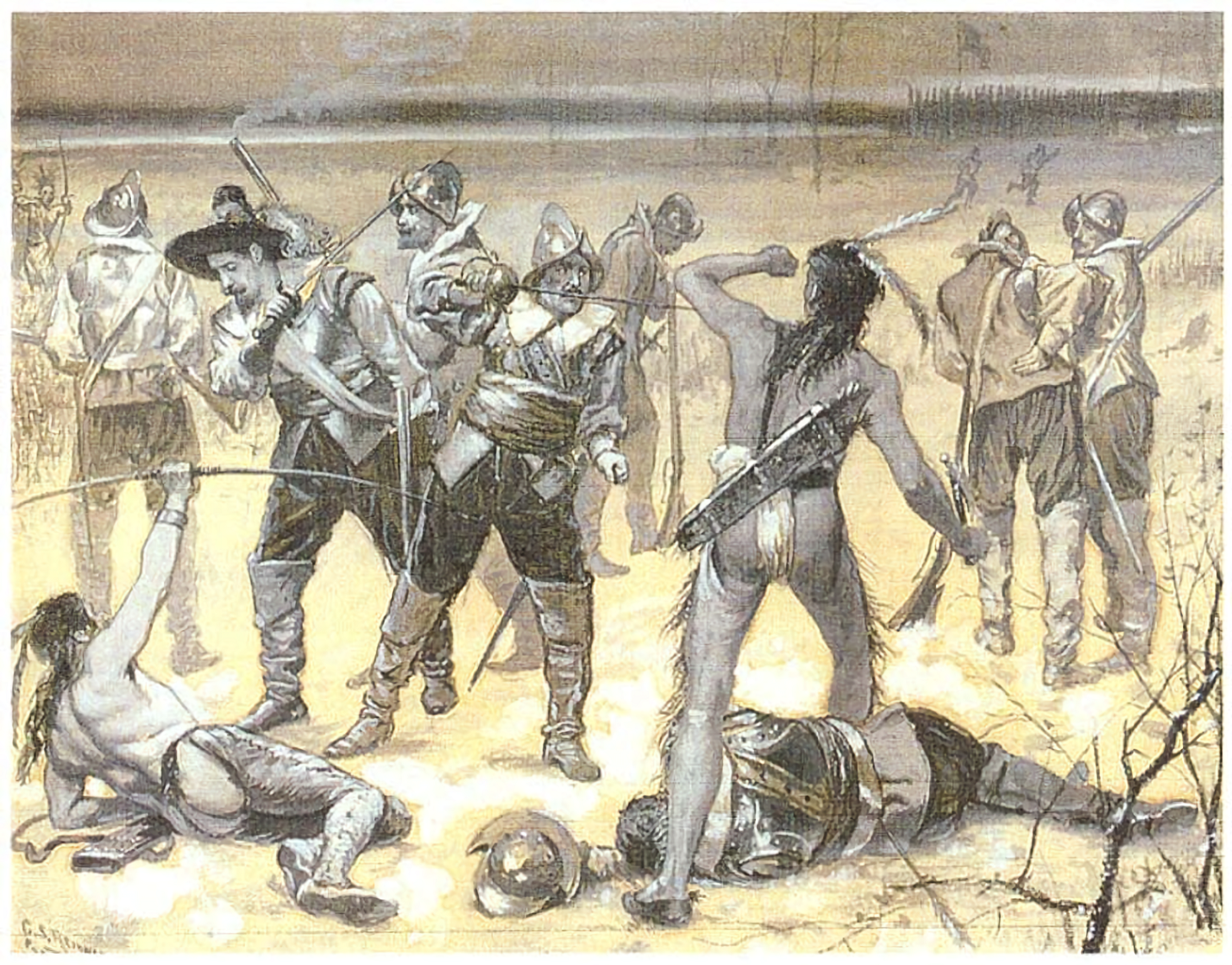
Lion Gardiner in the Pequot War from a Charles Stanley Reinhart drawing circa 1890

Beginning in the early 1630s, a series of contributing factors increased the tensions between English colonists and the nations of southeastern New England. Efforts to control fur trade access resulted in a series of escalating incidents and attacks that increased tensions on both sides. Political divisions widened between the Pequots and Mohegans as they aligned with different trade sources, the Mohegans with the English colonists and the Pequots with the Dutch colonists. The peace ended between the Dutch and Pequots when the Pequots assaulted a tribe of Indians who had tried to trade in the area of Hartford. Tensions grew as the Massachusetts Bay Colony became a stronghold for wampum production, which the Narragansetts and Pequots had controlled until the mid-1630s.

Adding to the tensions, John Stone and seven of his crew were murdered in 1634 by the Niantics, western tributary clients of the Pequots. Stone was from the West Indies and had been banished from Boston for malfeasance, including drunkenness, adultery, and piracy. He had abducted two Western Niantic men, forcing them to show him the way up the Connecticut River. Soon after, he and his crew were attacked and killed by a larger group of Western Niantics. The initial reactions in Boston varied from indifference to outright joy at Stone's death, but the colonial officials still felt compelled to protest the killing. According to the Pequots' later explanations, he was killed in reprisal for the Dutch murdering the principal Pequot sachem Tatobem, and they claimed to be unaware that Stone was English and not Dutch. (Contemporaneous accounts claim that the Pequots knew Stone to be English.) In the earlier incident, Tatobem had boarded a Dutch vessel to trade. Instead of conducting trade, the Dutch abducted him and demanded a substantial amount of ransom for his safe return. The Pequots quickly sent bushels of wampum to the Dutch, but received only Tatobem's dead body in return. But the colonial officials in Boston did not accept the Pequots' excuses that they had been unaware of Stone's nationality. Pequot sachem Sassacus sent the colonists some wampum to atone for the killing, but he refused the colonists' demands that the warriors responsible for Stone's death be turned over to them for trial and punishment.

The Great Colonial Hurricane of 1635 also placed a great deal of pressure on the harvests of that year, according to historian Katherine Grandjean, increasing competition for winter food supplies for several years afterwards throughout much of coastal Connecticut, Rhode Island, and Massachusetts. This, in turn, precipitated even greater tensions between the Pequots and English colonists, who were ill-prepared to face periods of famine.

A more proximate cause of the war was the killing of a trader named John Oldham, who was attacked on a voyage to Block Island on July 20, 1636. Several of his crew and he were killed and his ship was looted by Narragansett-allied Indians, who sought to discourage settlers from trading with their Pequot rivals. Oldham had a reputation as a troublemaker and had been exiled from Plymouth Colony shortly before the incident on Block Island. In the weeks that followed, officials from Massachusetts Bay, Rhode Island, and Connecticut assumed that the Narragansetts were the likely culprits. They knew that the Indians of Block Island were allies of the Eastern Niantics, who were allied with the Narragansetts, and they became suspicious of the Narragansetts. The murderers, meanwhile, escaped and were given sanctuary with the Pequots.

== Battles ==
There were several battles that collectively make up the Pequot War.

=== Massachusetts Bay Punitive Expedition (Endecott Expedition) ===
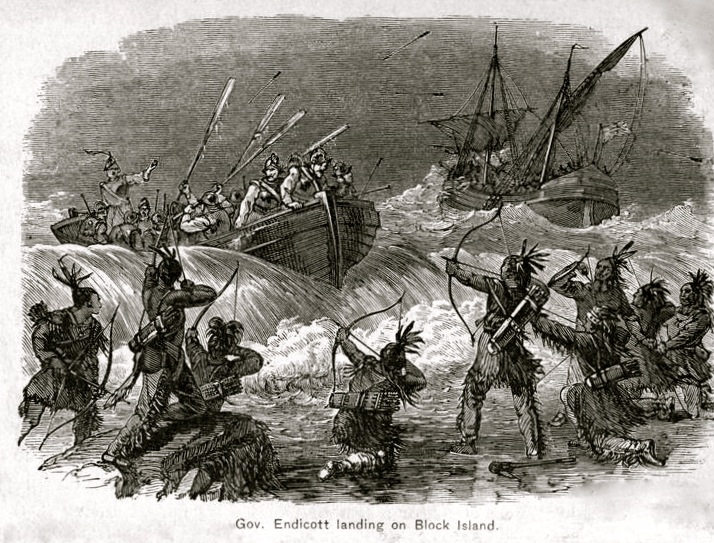
Engraving depicting Endecott's landing on Block Island

News of Oldham's death became the subject of sermons in the Massachusetts Bay Colony. In August, Governor Vane sent John Endecott to exact revenge on the Indians of Block Island. Endecott's party of roughly 90 men sailed to Block Island and attacked two apparently abandoned Niantic villages. Most of the Niantic escaped, while two of Endecott's men were injured. The English claimed to have killed 14, but later Narragansett reports claimed that only one Indian was killed on the island. The Massachusetts Bay militia burned the villages to the ground. They carried away crops that the Niantic had stored for winter and destroyed what they could not carry. Endecott went on to Fort Saybrook.

The English at Saybrook were unhappy about the raid, but agreed that some of them would accompany Endecott as guides. Endecott sailed along the coast to a Pequot village, where he repeated the previous year's demand for those responsible for the death of Stone, and now also for those who murdered Oldham. After some discussion, Endecott concluded that the Pequots were stalling and attacked, but most escaped into the woods. Endecott had his forces burn down the village and crops before sailing home.

=== Pequot raids ===
In the aftermath, the English of Connecticut Colony had to deal with the anger of the Pequots. The Pequots attempted to get their allies to join their cause, some 36 tributary villages, but were only partly effective. The Western Niantic (Nehantic) joined them, but the Eastern Niantic remained neutral. The traditional enemies of the Pequot, the Mohegan and the Narragansett, openly sided with the English. The Narragansetts had warred with and lost territory to the Pequots in 1622. Now, their friend Roger Williams urged the Narragansetts to side with the English against the Pequots.

Through the autumn and winter, Fort Saybrook was effectively besieged. People who ventured outside were killed. As spring arrived in 1637, the Pequots stepped up their raids on Connecticut towns. On April 23, Wangunk chief Sequin attacked Wethersfield with Pequot help. They killed six men and three women and a number of cattle and horses, and took two young girls captive. (They were daughters of William Swaine and were later ransomed by Dutch traders.) In all, the towns lost about 30 settlers.

In May, leaders of Connecticut River towns met in Hartford, raised a militia, and placed Captain John Mason in command. Mason set out with 90 militia and 70 Mohegan warriors under Uncas; their orders were to directly attack the Pequot at their fort. At Fort Saybrook, Captain Mason was joined by John Underhill with another 20 men. Underhill and Mason then sailed from Fort Saybrook to Narragansett Bay, a tactic intended to mislead Pequot spies along the shoreline into thinking that the English were not intending an attack. After gaining the support of 200 Narragansetts, Mason and Underhill marched their forces with Uncas and Wequash Cooke about 20 miles towards Mistick Fort (present-day Mystic). They briefly camped at Porter's Rocks near the head of the Mystic River before mounting a surprise attack just before dawn.

=== The Mystic massacre ===
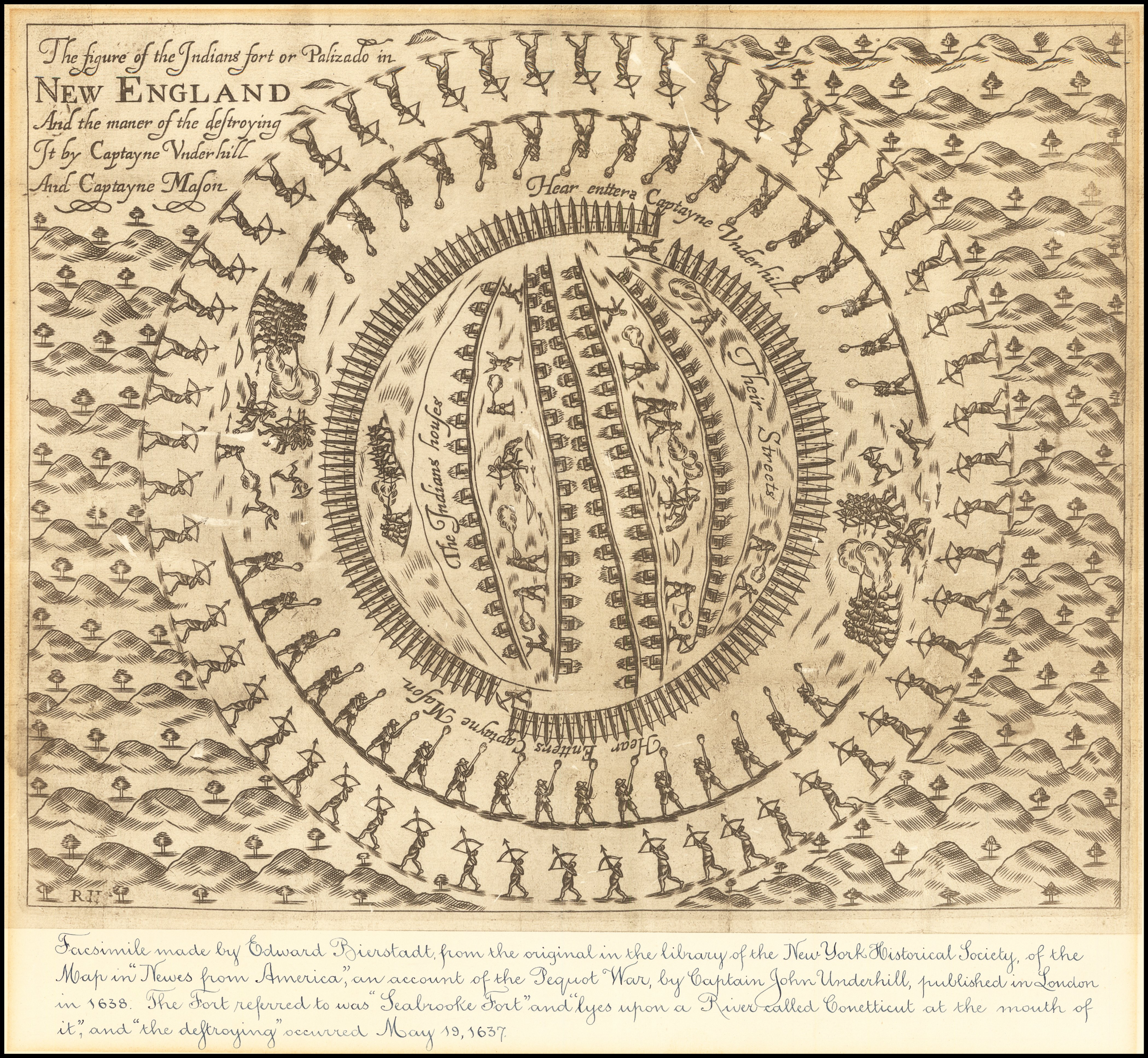
Engraving depicting the attack on the Pequot fort at Mystic, from John Underhill Newes from America, London, 1638

The Mystic Massacre started in the predawn hours of May 26, 1637, when colonial forces led by Captains John Mason and John Underhill, along with their allies from the Mohegan and Narragansett nations, surrounded one of two main fortified Pequot villages at Mistick. Only 20 soldiers breached the palisade's gate and they were quickly overwhelmed, to the point that they used fire to create chaos and facilitate their escape. The ensuing conflagration trapped the majority of the Pequots; those who managed to escape the fire were slain by the soldiers and warriors who surrounded the fort.

Mason later declared that the attack against the Pequots was the act of a God who "laughed his Enemies and the Enemies of his People to scorn", making the Pequot fort "as a fiery Oven", and "thus did the Lord judge among the Heathen." Of the estimated 500 Pequots in the fort, seven were taken prisoner and another seven escaped to the woods.

The Narragansetts and Mohegans with Mason and Underhill's colonial militia were horrified by the actions and "manner of the Englishmen's fight… because it is too furious, and slays too many men." The Narragansetts attempted to leave and return home, but were cut off by the Pequots from the other village of Weinshauks and had to be rescued by Underhill's men—after which they reluctantly rejoined the colonists for protection and were used to carry the wounded, thereby freeing more soldiers to fend off the numerous attacks along the withdrawal route.

=== War's end ===
The destruction of people and the village at Mistick Fort and losing even more warriors during the withdrawal pursuit broke the Pequot spirit, and they decided to abandon their villages and flee westward to seek refuge with the Mohawk Nation. Sassacus led roughly 400 warriors along the coast; when they crossed the Connecticut River, the Pequots killed three men whom they encountered near Fort Saybrook.

In mid-June, John Mason set out from Saybrook with 160 men and 40 Mohegan scouts led by Uncas. They caught up with the refugees at Sasqua, a Mattabesic village near present-day Fairfield, Connecticut. The colonists memorialized this event as the Fairfield Swamp Fight (not to be confused with the Great Swamp Fight during King Philip's War). The English surrounded the swamp and allowed several hundred to surrender, mostly women and children, but Sassacus slipped out before dawn with perhaps 80 warriors, and continued west.

Sassacus and his followers had hoped to gain refuge among the Mohawk in present-day New York. However, the Mohawk instead murdered his bodyguard and him, afterwards sending his head and hands to Hartford (for reasons which were never made clear). This essentially ended the Pequot War; colonial officials continued to call for hunting down what remained of the Pequots after war's end, but they granted asylum to any who went to live with the Narragansetts or Mohegans.

== Aftermath ==
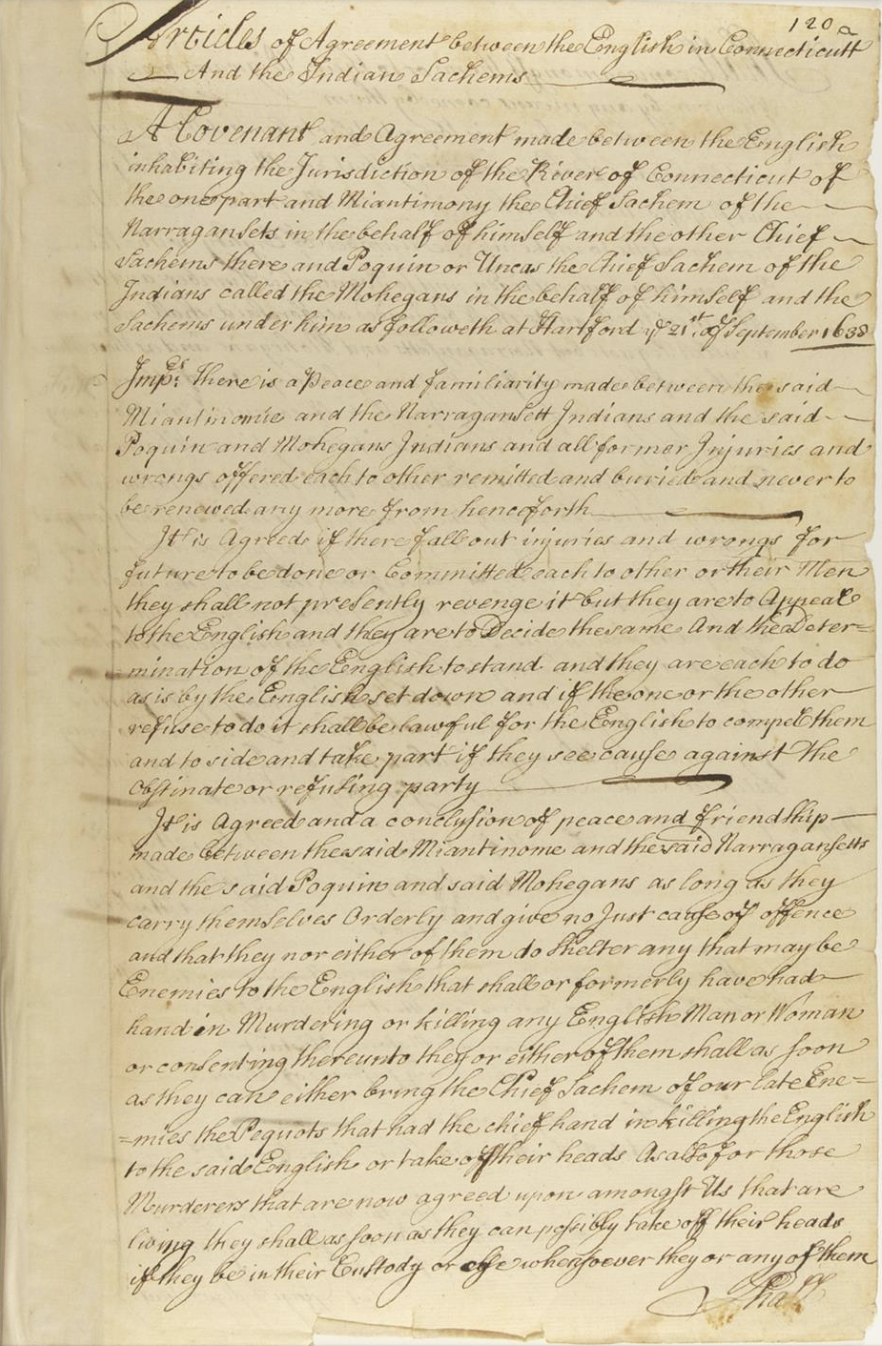
A 1743 copy of the Treaty of Hartford of 1638, which sought to eradicate the Pequot cultural identity by prohibiting the Pequots from returning to their lands, speaking their tribal language, or referring to themselves as Pequots.

In September, the Mohegans and Narragansetts met at the General Court of Connecticut and agreed on the disposition of the Pequot survivors. The agreement, known as the first Treaty of Hartford, was signed on September 21, 1638. About 200 Pequots survived the war; they finally gave up and submitted themselves under the authority of the sachem of the Mohegans or Narragansetts.

There were then given to Onkos, Sachem of Monheag, Eighty; to Myan Tonimo, Sachem of Narragansett, Eighty; and to Nynigrett, Twenty, when he should satisfy for a Mare of Edward Pomroye's killed by his Men. The Pequots were then bound by Covenant, That none should inhabit their native Country, nor should any of them be called PEQUOTS any more, but Moheags and Narragansatts for ever.

Other Pequots were enslaved and shipped to Bermuda or the West Indies, or were forced to become household slaves in English households in Connecticut and Massachusetts Bay. The Colonies essentially declared the Pequots extinct by prohibiting them from using the name any longer.

The colonists attributed their victory over the hostile Pequot nation to an act of God:

Let the whole Earth be filled with his glory! Thus the lord was pleased to smite our Enemies in the hinder Parts, and to give us their Land for an Inheritance.

This was the first instance wherein Algonquian peoples of southern New England encountered European-style warfare. After the Pequot War, no significant battles occurred between Indians and southern New England colonists for about 38 years. This long period of peace came to an end in 1675 with King Philip's War. According to historian Andrew Lipman, the Pequot War introduced the practice of colonists and Indians taking body parts as trophies of battle. Honor and monetary reimbursement was given to those who brought back heads and scalps of Pequots.

== Historical accounts and controversies ==
The earliest accounts of the Pequot War were written within one year of the war. Later histories recounted events from a similar perspective, restating arguments first used by military leaders such as John Underhill and John Mason, as well as Puritans Increase Mather and his son Cotton Mather.

Recent historians and others have reviewed these accounts. In 2004, an artist and archaeologist (Jack Dempsey and David R. Wagner) teamed up to evaluate the sequence of events in the Pequot War. Their popular history took issue with events and whether John Mason and John Underhill wrote the accounts that appeared under their names. The authors have been adopted as honorary members of the Lenape Pequots.

Most modern historians do not debate questions of the outcome of the battle or its chronology, such as Alfred A. Cave, a specialist in the ethnohistory of colonial America. However, Cave contends that Mason and Underhill's eyewitness accounts, as well as the contemporaneous histories of Mather and Hubbard, were more "polemical than substantive." Alden T. Vaughan writes that the Pequots were not "solely or even primarily responsible" for the war. "The Bay colony's gross escalation of violence… made all-out war unavoidable; until then, negotiation was at least conceivable."

== Documentaries ==
- In 2004, PBS aired the television documentary Mystic Voices: The Story of the Pequot War.
- The Mystic Massacre was featured in the 2006 History Channel series 10 Days that Unexpectedly Changed America.

== See also ==
- History of Connecticut
- History of Massachusetts
- Indian massacre
- Philip Vincent
- The Pequot War (book) by Alfred Caves
