= John Oldham (colonist) =

Early Puritan settler in Massachusetts

John "Captain Mad Jack" Oldham
- Born: July 1595; Derbyshire, England
- Died: July 20, 1636 (aged 40–41); Block Island
- Other name: "Mad Jack"
- Occupations: landowner, magistrate
- Known for: Founder of Wethersfield, Connecticut
- Spouse: Jane Bissell
- Children: Richard, Mary, John Jr.

John Oldham (July 1595 – July 20, 1636) was an early Puritan settler in Massachusetts. He was a captain, merchant, and "Indian trader." His death at the hands of the Native Americans was one of the causes of the Pequot War of 1636–37.

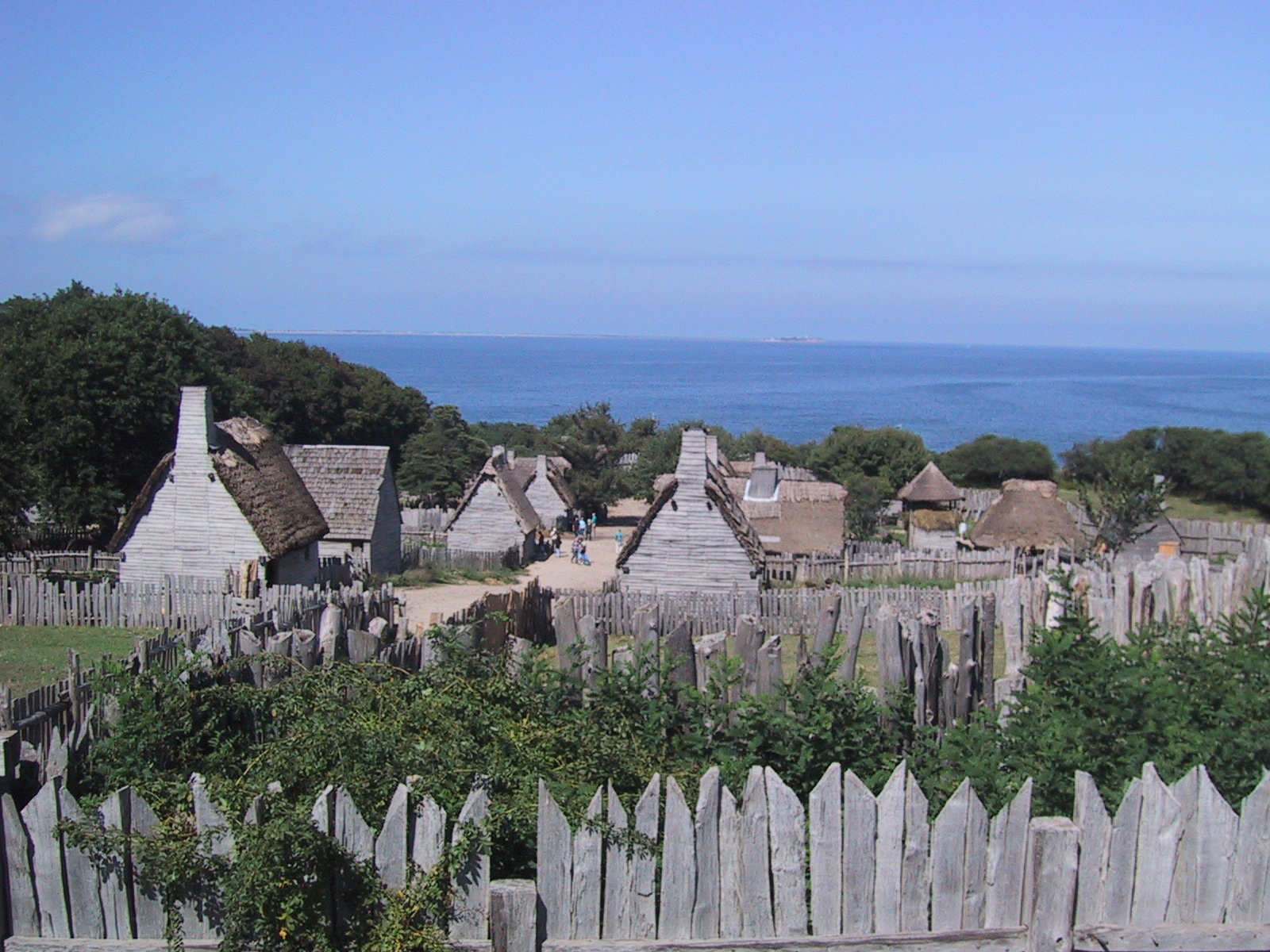
Plymouth Plantation, where Oldham first settled in America

== Early life ==
Oldham was born in Derbyshire, England, in 1595, and was baptized at the Church of All Saints (now Derby Cathedral) in Derby on July 15, 1595. He was a follower of the Puritans from an early age, and emigrated to Plymouth Colony with his sister in July 1623 aboard the Anne. His sister Lucretia Oldham Brewster was married to Jonathan Brewster, son of William Brewster, one of the signers of the Mayflower Compact.

== Banishment from Plymouth Plantation ==
Some of those who sailed on the Mayflower had come for economic opportunity rather than religious motivations. In 1624, Rev. John Lyford came to America and was welcomed at first, but soon Plymouth residents gravitated to him who did not share the Puritans' viewpoints. Lyford gave them encouragement and met with them in secret. Oldham was a supporter of Lyford, and the two of them stirred up dissension and trouble in Plymouth, according to the accounts of Pilgrim leader William Bradford.

Oldham and Lyford secretly wrote letters back to England disparaging and slandering the Pilgrims. Bradford intercepted some of these letters but did not mention it immediately to Oldham or Lyford. Oldham next refused to stand his scheduled watch (a communal duty expected of all the men) and began to be insolent to the Pilgrims' military advisor Miles Standish. He then drew his knife on Standish unprovoked, and angrily denounced him as a "beggarly rascal". Lyford and Oldham were put on trial for "plotting against them and disturbing their peace, both in respects of their civil and church state," and they were banished from Plymouth.

== After Plymouth ==
Along with Richard Vines, Oldham secured a land grant for Biddeford, Maine in 1630, although he continued to live in Massachusetts area. Oldham recovered and prospered from coastal trade with colonists and with the indigenous peoples. He became a representative to the General Court of Massachusetts from 1632 to 1634, and was the overseer of shot and powder for Massachusetts Bay Colony.

As a trader, Captain Oldham sailed to Virginia and England, but by 1630 he was back in the Massachusetts Bay Colony. He took up residence on an island in the Charles River and was a member of the church at Watertown. He represented Watertown in the colony's first General Court or assembly in 1634. He continued in the "Indian trade," sailing the coast from Maine to New Amsterdam.

In 1634, Oldham led a group of ten men (which included Captain Robert Seeley) along the Old Connecticut Path to establish Wethersfield, Connecticut, the first English settlement on the Connecticut River.

== Death ==
On July 20, 1636, Oldham was on a voyage to trade with Native Americans on Block Island when the Natives boarded his ship- whom were possibly of Narragansett origin. The Natives killed him and five of his crew, captured his two young nephews, and looted the ship's cargo. A fishing vessel rescued the nephews and tried to tow his sloop to port, but adverse winds affected them. They scuttled the ship but brought home the two boys.

The Narragansetts convinced the colonists that the Pequot peoples were responsible for killing Oldham. Oldham was known for his difficult ways and may have provoked the fight that killed him, but ministers across Massachusetts condemned the murders. Massachusetts Governor John Endecott was ordered to retaliate. The Bay Colony was outraged at this latest incident and sent John Endicott to Block Island.
