= Canonchet =

Narragansett Sachem and leader of Native American troops (died 1676)

Canonchet (also Nauntenoo or Cononchet or Quanonchet, died April 3, 1676) was a Narragansett Sachem and leader of Native American troops during the Great Swamp Fight and King Philip's War. He was a son of Miantonomo.

Canonchet was a leader of the separatist Native community, or those who did not ally with English colonialists and did not accept the authority of European settlers. He developed a reputation for resisting the colonial leaders, who viewed him as "Ringleader of almost all this mischief, and great incendiary betwixt us [the English] and the Narragansetts," and who said that as "the son of Miantonomi, and heir of all his pride and insolence, as well as his malice against the English," Canonchet was "a most perfideous villain." Once, when retreating from a group of Connecticut troops, he removed and threw down his European-style clothing as a way to symbolically challenge the ways of the settlers. He also maintained that traditional Native food sources, especially corn, were essential enough that it was worth risking capture to obtain them from contested regions. After the Narragansetts were driven from their tribal lands, he is said to have said: "We will die, to the last man, but we will not be slaves to the English." He proposed using the region of Northampton, Massachusetts as a refuge for children and the elderly.

These beliefs made Canonchet a target of colonial leaders, who commissioned Pequot, Mohegan, and Niantic executioners to kill him. The English decided to have Native executioners kill him because they believed, in the words of Increase Mather, that "those three Indian Nations are to become abominable to the other Indians [after killing Canonchet], and it is now their interest to be faithfull to the English, since their own Countrymen will never forgive them."

Canonchet was surprised and captured in Narragansett territory on April 2, 1676. His life was offered him on condition of making peace with the English, but he spurned the proposition. When informed that he was to be put to death, he said: "I like it well. I shall die before my heart is soft, and before I have spoken a word unworthy of myself." He asked to be executed by the Mohegan sachem Uncas, since he considered Uncas to be "his fellow Prince," as they were both sons of tribal chiefs. He was executed by the Mohegan sachem Oneco, the Pequot warrior Robin Cassacinamon, and the Niantic sachem Harman Garrett (or his son). After being shot, drawn, and quartered as a traitor in Stonington, Connecticut on April 3, Canonchet's head was sent to colonial leaders in Hartford, Connecticut, who celebrated his death.
