= Robin Cassacinamon =

Sachem Robin Cassacinamon

Governor and Sachem of the Pequot
- In office 1655–1692

Personal details
- Born: c.1620s
- Died: 1692
- Occupation: Tribal Chief, translator, soldier

Military service
- Allegiance: Pequot; New England Confederation
- Battles/wars: King Phillip's War

Robin Cassacinamon (c.1620s-1692) was a Pequot Indian governor appointed by the United Colonies to govern Pequots in southeastern Connecticut.

The New England colonies placed Cassacinamon under the authority of colonial ally Uncas of the Mohegan tribe following the Pequot War of 1637. In 1638, Cassacinamon became a servant in the home of John Winthrop in Boston where he learned English. He served as a translator, and he helped the Pequots to request to be under colonial authority rather than under Uncas. By the late 1640s Cassacinamon was with John Winthrop, Jr. in what is now New London.

By 1655, the United Colonies appointed Cassacinamon to be governor of the Pequots in settlements at Nameaug (New London, Connecticut) and Noank. Cassacinamon executed Canonchet during King Philip's War, and the colonies commended his service during the war. He used his negotiation skills to secure the return of some tribal lands, resulting in the establishment of an approximately 3,000-acre reservation in 1665-1666. He remained sachem until his death in 1692.

In the late 20th Century, the Mashantucket Pequot Tribal Nation adopted Cassacinamon's ligature as part of their tribal seal.
