= List of shipwrecks in 1990 =

The list of shipwrecks in 1990 includes ships sunk, foundered, grounded, or otherwise lost during 1990.

table of contents
1990
Jan	Feb	Mar	Apr
May	Jun	Jul	Aug
Sep	Oct	Nov	Dec
Unknown date

== January ==
=== 4 January ===
List of shipwrecks: 4 January 1990
Ship	State	Description
Boleslaw Krzywousty	Poland	Eritrean War of Independence: The cargo ship was hit by rockets fired by Eritrean rebels and either sank or was beached (16°23′N 39°12′E). Later declared a constructive total loss, lending credence to the possibility that she was beached.

=== 8 January ===
List of shipwrecks: 8 January 1990
Ship	State	Description
Orient Pioneer	Liberia	The bulk carrier was abandoned in the Indian Ocean. She was on a voyage from Tubarao, Brazil to Kaohsiung, Taiwan. Orient Pioneer sank on 21 January.

=== 9 January ===
List of shipwrecks: 9 January 1990
Ship	State	Description
Sally Albatross	Finland	The cruiseferry caught fire at Finnboda, Nacka, Sweden. Her superstructure was consequently scrapped and the hull was salvaged and rebuilt.

=== 20 January ===
List of shipwrecks: 20 January 1990
Ship	State	Description
Charlie	Cyprus	The cargo ship foundered in the Atlantic Ocean north of the Azores with the loss of all 27 crew.

=== 28 January ===
List of shipwrecks: 28 January 1990
Ship	State	Description
Bobby Lee	United States	The 32-foot (9.8 m) fishing vessel sank in Frederick Sound in the Alexander Archipelago in Southeast Alaska after she became disabled during bad weather. A United States Coast Guard helicopter rescued her crew of two.

=== 29 January ===
List of shipwrecks: 29 January 1990
Ship	State	Description
American Star	United States	The110-foot (33.5 m) crab-fishing vessel was wrecked on a beach on Otter Island in the Pribilof Islands in the Bering Sea. A United States Coast Guard helicopter rescued her entire crew of six.
Kittiwake	United States Fish and Wildlife Service	During a voyage in the Aleutian Islands from Kagalaska Island to Adak, Alaska, the 25-foot (7.6 m) motor vessel, an Alaska Maritime National Wildlife Refuge boat, drifted onto the western coast of Adak Island in the Aleutian Islands during a blizzard, was swamped by a wave, and capsized with the loss of one man and one woman – both United States Fish and Wildlife Service employees – on board. Her two survivors – a man and a woman – were rescued by United States Coast Guard and United States Navy personnel on 30 January.

=== 30 January ===
List of shipwrecks: 30 January 1990
Ship	State	Description
Flag Theofano	Greece	The bulk cement carrier foundered in the English Channel off the Isle of Wight with the loss of all nineteen crew.

=== Unknown date ===
List of shipwrecks: Unknown date in January 1990
Ship	State	Description
Bessledno	Soviet Union	The destroyer sank in the Taiwan Strait whilst under tow to India for scrapping.

== February ==
=== 4 February ===
List of shipwrecks: 4 February 1990
Ship	State	Description
Pavlov	United States	The 163-foot (49.7 m) fishing vessel was destroyed by fire in the Pribilof Islands. The fishing vessel Shishaldin (United States) rescued all 19 members of her crew from life rafts.

=== 22 February ===
List of shipwrecks: 22 February 1990
Ship	State	Description
Cobra	United States	The 58-foot (17.7 m) fishing vessel flooded and was abandoned in Swanson Harbor (58°11′30″N 135°05′00″W) in Southeast Alaska. The fishing vessel Jenny (United States) rescued her crew of four.

=== 27 February ===
List of shipwrecks: 27 February 1990
Ship	State	Description
Romance	United States	The 36-foot (11.0 m) troller rolled over and sank in the harbor at Wrangell, Alaska. Another fishing vessel rescued all four people – two adults and two children – aboard.

=== 28 February ===
List of shipwrecks: 28 February 1990
Ship	State	Description
J. Aus	United States	The 54-foot (16.5 m) fishing trawler disappeared in a gale in the Gulf of Alaska during a voyage from Blaine, Washington, to King Cove, Alaska, with the loss of all three people on board.

== March ==
=== 4 March ===
List of shipwrecks: 4 March 1990
Ship	State	Description
Toledo	Hong Kong	The bulk carrier was beached at Pendower Beach, Falmouth, Cornwall.

=== 9 March ===
List of shipwrecks: 9 March 1990
Ship	State	Description
K T	United States	The 65-foot (19.8 m) fishing vessel became disabled and sank at McLean Point (54°47′30″N 131°57′15″W) in Southeast Alaska. The tug Simpson (United States) rescued her entire crew of three.

=== 14 March ===
List of shipwrecks: 14 March 1990
Ship	State	Description
Alexandre P	Panama	The bulk carrier foundered off Dampier, Western Australia with the loss of all hands. She was on a voyage from Dampier to Cape Town, South Africa.

=== 15 March ===
List of shipwrecks: 15 March 1990
Ship	State	Description
Alaskan Monarch	United States	While trying to enter the harbor at St. Paul on Saint Paul Island in the Bering Sea, the 92-foot (28.0 m) crab-fishing vessel became trapped in ice and was forced aground by wind and surf. A United States Coast Guard helicopter rescued her crew of six as 25-foot (7.6 m) waves broke over her. She broke up on the beach, and her wreckage later was removed.

=== 22 March ===
List of shipwrecks: 22 March 1990
Ship	State	Description
Aleutian Enterprise	United States	The 142-foot (43.3 m) fish processing trawler capsized and sank in the Bering Sea approximately 60 nautical miles (110 km; 69 mi) south of Saint Paul Island with the loss of nine lives. There were 22 survivors.
Azalea	South Korea	The cargo ship sprung a leak when a ballast tank cracked. She capsized and sank in the North Sea while under tow 12 nautical miles (22 km; 14 mi) northwest of Haugesund, Norway. Four crew were killed. The wreck was located in 2023.

=== 29 March ===
List of shipwrecks: 29 March 1990
Ship	State	Description
Attu	United States	The 65-foot (19.8 m) longline fishing schooner ran aground and sank at Kayak Island on the south-central coast of Alaska. Her crew of seven survived.

== April ==
=== 2 April ===
List of shipwrecks: 2 April 1990
Ship	State	Description
Tadoussac	Canada	The lake freighter struck a bridge abutment at Port Colborne, Ontario. The ship received an 11-foot (3 m) crack in her hull and the abutment was also damaged.

=== 7 April ===
List of shipwrecks: 7 April 1990
Ship	State	Description
Scandinavian Star	Bahamas	The ferry suffered two fires fifteen minutes apart whilst in the Skagerrak. The second of which was arson. One hundred and fifty-eight people were killed in the fire, which burned for ten hours. She was subsequently repaired and returned to service.
Takan	United States	The 45-foot (13.7 m) halibut longliner sank in 15-foot (4.6 m) seas off (Cape Spencer in Southeast Alaska. Her four-man crew abandoned ship in survival suits and all were rescued by a United States Coast Guard helicopter.

=== 9 April ===
List of shipwrecks: 9 April 1990
Ship	State	Description
"Cotsmuir"	United Kingdom	The 24.39-metre (80.0 ft) fishing vessel's prop was fouled by her trawl and was towed to Amlwch Harbour, Isle of Anglesey, Wales. When the tide went out she rolled on her side and flooded on the next tide. Raised on 13 April, repaired and returned to service.

=== 19 April ===
List of shipwrecks: 19 April 1990
Ship	State	Description
Mineral Star	Cyprus	The cargo ship was beached at Vitória, Brazil after her engine room flooded. She was refloated in July, but was declared a constructive total loss and sold for scrap. Mineral Star was scrapped at Alang, India in 1992.

=== 25 April ===
List of shipwrecks: 25 April 1990
Ship	State	Description
Mardi Sue Lynn	United States	The 35-foot (10.7 m) crab-fishing vessel burned to the waterline at Cape Chiniak on the south-central coast of Alaska. Her crew of three abandoned ship in a Zodiac inflatable boat and survived.

=== 26 April ===
List of shipwrecks: 26 April 1990
Ship	State	Description
Deborah D	United States	The 99-foot (30.2 m) fish tender ran aground and sank while at anchor in Ursus Cove (59°32′N 153°40′W) on the south-central coast of Alaska.

=== 27 April ===
List of shipwrecks: 27 April 1990
Ship	State	Description
Troy	United States	The retired 90-foot (27.4 m) tug was scuttled as an artificial reef in 75 feet (23 m) of water in the North Atlantic Ocean east of Ocean City, New Jersey, at 39°15.290′N 074°14.060′W.

=== 29 April ===
List of shipwrecks: 29 April 1990
Ship	State	Description
Buzzard	United States	The 25-foot (7.6 m) fishing vessel sank off Naked Island (60°40′N 147°25′W) in Prince William Sound on the south-central coast of Alaska. The fishing vessel Breaker (United States) rescued her crew of three.

== May ==
=== 1 May ===
List of shipwrecks: 1 May 1990
Ship	State	Description
Beaver	United States	The 65-foot (19.8 m) fish tender ran aground without loss of life near Kodiak, Alaska, and was abandoned.
Little Ann	United States	The 90-foot (27.4 m) longline halibut-fishing vessel sank on Portlock Bank (58°20′00″N 150°30′00″W) in the Gulf of Alaska 60 nautical miles (110 km; 69 mi) east of Kodiak, Alaska. The fishing vessel Sandra Su (United States) rescued all eight people aboard.

=== 6 May ===
List of shipwrecks: 6 May 1990
Ship	State	Description
Captain Henry	United States	The retired 56-foot (17.1 m) LCM-6-class landing craft mechanized was scuttled as an artificial reef in the North Atlantic Ocean off Cape May, New Jersey, at 38°51.200′N 074°42.280′W.

=== 14 May ===
List of shipwrecks: 14 May 1990
Ship	State	Description
Unknown speed boat	Eritrean Liberation Front	Eritrean War of Independence: The speed boat blew up and sank during a battle with the minesweeper Razvedchik (Soviet Navy).

=== 15 May ===
List of shipwrecks: 15 May 1990
Ship	State	Description
Smokwa	United States	After being refloated from where she had sunk about a year earlier at her moorings near Port Lions, Alaska, on Kodiak Island, the derelict 1,588-ton steamer – formerly a ferry and later a fish processing vessel – was towed out of Kizhuyak Bay and scuttled in waters 6,000 feet (1,800 m) deep in the Gulf of Alaska. One account claims that she began to sink on her own before the scuttling process could begin, forcing her towing vessel, the salvage tug Salvage Chief (United States), to cut her loose to avoid being pulled under with her.

=== 27 May ===
List of shipwrecks: 27 May 1990
Ship	State	Description
Foxfire	United States	The 30-foot (9.1 m) fishing vessel burned and sank in Prince William Sound off Point Pigot (60°48′15″N 148°20′45″W) on the south-central coast of Alaska. The vessel Azuma Searay (United States) rescued the only person aboard.
Unknown speed boat	Eritrean Liberation Front	Eritrean War of Independence: The speed boat flipped from a depth charge explosion during a battle with the patrol boat AK-312 (Soviet Navy).
Unknown speed boat(s)	Eritrean Liberation Front	Eritrean War of Independence: One or two speed boats were shelled and sunk during a battle with the patrol boat AK-312 (Soviet Navy).

== June ==
=== 6 June ===
List of shipwrecks: 6 June 1990
Ship	State	Description
Va-Sea-Lees	United States	The 40-foot (12.2 m) fiberglass longline halibut fishing vessel was destroyed by an engine room fire and sank off the south-central coast of Alaska in Prince William Sound outside of Strawberry Channel (60°24′N 146°03′W).

=== 7 June ===
List of shipwrecks: 7 June 1990
Ship	State	Description
Coho	United States	The 29-foot (8.8 m) longline halibut-fishing vessel capsized and sank on the south-central coast of Alaska in Cook Inlet off Dangerous Cape (59°24′00″N 151°54′20″W) after she took water over her stern while heavily loaded with fish.

=== 19 June ===
List of shipwrecks: 19 June 1990
Ship	State	Description
Hana Cove	United States	The 50-foot (15.2 m) fish tender sank in Valdez Narrows (61°03′15″N 146°40′30″W) on the south-central coast of Alaska after she lost steering and struck a rock. Her crew of four swam to shore in survival suits and survived.

=== 20 June ===
List of shipwrecks: 20 June 1990
Ship	State	Description
Justy	United States	The 30-foot (9.1 m) fishing vessel sank near Robert Island (57°18′15″N 133°28′50″W) in Southeast Alaska. The fishing vessel Alaska Dawn (United States) rescued her crew of two.

=== 27 June ===
List of shipwrecks: 27 June 1990
Ship	State	Description
Shin Yang Ho	South Korea	The 261-foot (79.6 m) fishing vessel sank in Bristol Bay 60 nautical miles (110 km; 69 mi) south of Dillingham, Alaska, after colliding with the vessel Shinei Maru No. 63 (Japan). All 55 members of her crew survived.

== July ==
=== 7 July ===
List of shipwrecks: 7 July 1990
Ship	State	Description
Debby Joann	United States	The 38-foot (11.6 m) fishing vessel sank in 30 feet (9.1 m) of water in Cook Inlet off Kasilof, Alaska. The only person aboard survived.

=== 14 July ===
List of shipwrecks: 14 July 1990
Ship	State	Description
Lady Louise	United States	The 49-foot (14.9 m) salmon troller struck a rock and sank at Point Turbot (57°09′45″N 134°48′00″W) in Southeast Alaska. A private helicopter rescued her crew.

=== 17 July ===
List of shipwrecks: 17 July 1990
Ship	State	Description
Carol Moran	United States	The retired 100-foot (30.5 m) tug was scuttled as an artificial reef in 90 feet (27 m) of water in the North Atlantic Ocean east of Ocean City, New Jersey, at 39°15.449′N 074°14.173′W.

=== 22 July ===
List of shipwrecks: 22 July 1990
Ship	State	Description
Min Ping Yu No. 5540	China	The 17.5-metre (57 ft) fishing boat was stranded on a beach in Pingtan County, Fujian, and 25 corpses were found in two of its holds who had died from suffocation. It was used by the Taiwan military for repatriation of 76 mainland Chinese illegal immigrants, 63 of whom were kept in holds sealed with long nails by the military.

=== 30 July ===
List of shipwrecks: 30 July 1990
Ship	State	Description
Diosa del Mar	United States	The schooner ran aground on Ship Rock, Catalina Island, California (33°27′46″N 118°29′31″W) whilst avoiding a collision with a powerboat and sank.

== August ==
=== 3 August ===
List of shipwrecks: 3 August 1990
Ship	State	Description
Makaka	United States	The 152-foot (46.3 m) fish tender was wrecked without loss of life on Fern Reef (55°29′30″N 133°15′50″W) off San Fernando Island (55.5141667°N 133.3569444°W) in Southeast Alaska.

=== 6 August ===
List of shipwrecks: 6 August 1990
Ship	State	Description
St. Marks	United Kingdom	The 140-foot (43 m), 434-ton oil rig safety (rescue) vessel was sunk in a collision with the tugboat Vikingbank (United Kingdom) and/or a barge she was towing off Cromer.

=== 8 August ===
List of shipwrecks: 8 August 1990
Ship	State	Description
Lisa Michelle	United States	The retired 110-foot (33.5 m) barge was scuttled as an artificial reef in the North Atlantic Ocean off Cape May, New Jersey, at 38°53.505′N 074°40.075′W.

=== 13 August ===
List of shipwrecks: 13 August 1990
Ship	State	Description
Min Ping Yu No. 5202	China	The 50-foot (15 m) fishing boat was hit by the accompanying Taiwanese naval frigate ROCS Wen Shan 13 nautical miles (24 km; 15 mi) to the north of Keelung. It then broke into two pieces and sank. 21 people were drowned. It was used by the Taiwan military for repatriation of 50 mainland Chinese illegal immigrants.

=== 19 August ===
List of shipwrecks: 19 August 1990
Ship	State	Description
Karen Lee	United States	The 58-foot (17.7 m) salmon gillnetter capsized suddenly and sank off Peninsular Point (57°30′30″N 134°50′00″W) in Chatham Strait in the Alexander Archipelago in Southeast Alaska. The fishing vessel Polar Lady (United States) rescued all seven members of her crew.

=== 24 August ===
List of shipwrecks: 24 August 1990
Ship	State	Description
Verma	United States	The 46-foot (14.0 m) wooden salmon fishing vessel sank with the loss of one crew member after colliding with the tug John Brix (United States) in Snow Pass (56°17′N 132°57′W) in Southeast Alaska. The fishing vessel Viking Serenade (United States) rescued her other five crew members.

=== 27 August ===
List of shipwrecks: 27 August 1990
Ship	State	Description
Padgie	United States	The 45-foot (13.7 m) salmon troller was wrecked without loss of life in Yakutat Bay on the coast of Alaska after her anchor line broke.

=== 31 August ===
List of shipwrecks: 31 August 1990
Ship	State	Description
Unidentified patrol boat	Spanish Navy	The P-205 Type patrol boat was destroyed by a bomb planted by ETA at San Sebastián.

=== Unknown date ===
List of shipwrecks: Unknown
Ship	State	Description
Pasithea	Greece	Carrying a cargo of iron ore, the ore-oil bulk carrier was last heard from on 4 August and subsequently vanished soon thereafter in the Pacific Ocean off Kashima, Japan, during Typhoon Vernon.

== September ==
=== 1 September ===
List of shipwrecks: 1 September 1990
Ship	State	Description
Sea Lady	United States	The 36-foot (11.0 m) salmon-fishing vessel sank after an engine room fire destroyed her off Ninilchik, Alaska. Her two crew members were rescued from a life raft.

=== 3 September ===
List of shipwrecks: 3 September 1990
Ship	State	Description
Robert E. Lee	United States	The 24-foot (7.3 m) fishing vessel was swamped and wrecked on Perry Island in Prince William Sound on the south-central coast of Alaska. The only person aboard spent the night on the island and was rescued the next day by the fishing vessel Northern Light (United States).

=== 6 September ===
List of shipwrecks: 6 September 1990
Ship	State	Description
RFA Fort Victoria	Royal Navy	The Troubles, RFA Fort Victoria bombing: The Fort Victoria-class replenishment oiler was damaged at Belfast, County Antrim by a bomb placed in her engine room by the IRA. She was repaired and entered service three years behind schedule.

=== 9 September ===
List of shipwrecks: 9 September 1990
Ship	State	Description
Puck	United States	The 30-foot (9.1 m) fishing vessel capsized in Prince William Sound on the south-central coast of Alaska. The fishing vessel Controller Bay (United States) rescued the only person aboard from atop Puck′s overturned hull.

=== 11 September ===
List of shipwrecks: 1 September 1990
Ship	State	Description
Lieutenant	United States	The retired 51-foot (15.5 m) fishing trawler was scuttled as an artificial reef in the North Atlantic Ocean south of Long Island off Shinnecock Inlet, New York.

=== 12 September ===
List of shipwrecks: 12 September 1990
Ship	State	Description
Caddell	United States	The retired 178-foot (54.3 m) floating drydock was scuttled as an artificial reef in the North Atlantic Ocean off Fire Island south of Long Island, New York.

=== 13 September ===
List of shipwrecks: 13 September 1990
Ship	State	Description
Kanatee	United States	The 38-foot (11.6 m) fishing vessel flooded at Beauchamp Island (56°43′N 134°14′W) in Southeast Alaska southeast of Sitka, Alaska. Her crew of two abandoned ship in a skiff and was rescued from the beach by a United States Coast Guard helicopter.

=== 14 September ===
List of shipwrecks: 14 September 1990
Ship	State	Description
Ku Sun K	United States	The 32-foot (9.8 m) fishing vessel ran aground in Cannery Bay (53°42′30″N 166°47′30″W) on the northern coast of Unalaska Island in the Aleutian Islands after a wave struck her. The only person aboard survived.
Wilhaul Too	United States	The 92-foot (28.0 m) fish tender sank in Ugashik Bay, Alaska, in rough weather while operating with a hole in her hull. The refrigerated cargo ship Mizuho Ace (flag unknown) rescued her entire crew of seven.

=== 16 September ===
List of shipwrecks: 16 September 1990
Ship	State	Description
Sanda	United States	The 44-foot (13.4 m) longline halibut-fishing vessel dragged her anchor, ran aground, and broke up in the surf in Main Bay (60°33′N 148°02′W) on the south-central coast of Alaska. Her two-man crew survived and was rescued by the fishing vessel Rain Song (United States).
Wind Song	United States	The 50-foot (15.2 m) crab-fishing vessel was wrecked on Wingham Island in the Gulf of Alaska. A United States Coast Guard helicopter hoisted her four-man crew to safety.

=== 23 September ===
List of shipwrecks: 23 September 1990
Ship	State	Description
Janice M	United States	The 47-foot (14.3 m) longline fishing vessel was destroyed off Cape Hinchinbrook on the south-central coast of Alaska by a fire that started when a leaky gasoline can was placed near her cook stove. Her crew of three survived.

=== 27 September ===
List of shipwrecks: 27 September 1990
Ship	State	Description
Salmo Point	United States	The 85-foot (25.9 m) fishing vessel sank near Yakutat, Alaska. Wearing survival suits, all three of her crewmen were rescued by a United States Coast Guard helicopter.

=== 29 September ===
List of shipwrecks: 29 September 1990
Ship	State	Description
Day’s End	United States	The 31-foot (9.4 m) salmon-fishing vessel capsized off Montague Island off the south-central coast of Alaska. The only person aboard perished.

=== Unknown date ===
List of shipwrecks: Unknown date September 1990
Ship	State	Description
Ms. Aries	United States	The 42-foot (12.8 m) salmon seiner sank without loss of life during a voyage from Chignik to Kodiak, Alaska.
HMS Naiad	Royal Navy	The Leander-class frigate was sunk as a target.

== October ==
=== 1 October ===
List of shipwrecks: 1 October 1990
Ship	State	Description
Curlew	United States	The 33-foot (10.1 m) fish tender capsized and sank in bad weather off the Barren Islands off the south-central coast of Alaska. Her crew of two survived.

=== 8 October ===
List of shipwrecks: 8 October 1990
Ship	State	Description
Arcticus Rex	United States	The 29-foot (8.8 m) salmon-fishing vessel capsized and sank in Unimak Pass in the Aleutian Islands. Both members of her crew – a man and a woman – perished.

=== 16 October ===
List of shipwrecks: 16 October 1990
Ship	State	Description
Rio Orinoco	Cyprus	The asphalt tanker ran aground on the southern shore Anticosti Island in the Gulf of St. Lawrence. Salvage efforts initially failed and the vessel was declared a total loss and abandoned. A second round of salvage attempts later freed the vessel several months later.

=== 19 October ===
List of shipwrecks: 19 October 1990
Ship	State	Description
Joy Seas	United States	The 32-foot (9.8 m) fishing vessel ran aground and was lost in Bass Harbor (60°37′30″N 147°24′30″W) in Prince William Sound on the south-central coast of Alaska. A United States Coast Guard helicopter rescued her crew of five.

=== 24 October ===
List of shipwrecks: 24 October 1990
Ship	State	Description
Pacific Apollo	United States	The 167-foot (50.9 m) fishing vessel sank off the Queen Charlotte Islands off British Columbia, Canada. Three of the four people on board perished.

=== 30 October ===
List of shipwrecks: 30 October 1990
Ship	State	Description
Margaret Nancy	United States	The retired 75-foot (22.9 m) fishing trawler and clam dredger was scuttled as an artificial reef in the North Atlantic Ocean east of Ocean City, New Jersey, at 39°15.177′N 074°13.898′W.
Mary C	United States	The retired 240-foot (73.2 m) tank barge was scuttled as an artificial reef in the North Atlantic Ocean 6.5 nautical miles (12.0 km; 7.5 mi) off Harvey Cedars, New Jersey, in 80 feet (24 m) of water at 39°37.168′N 074°01.720′W.

== November ==
=== 9 November ===
List of shipwrecks: 9 November 1990
Ship	State	Description
Becca Dawn	United States	The 52-foot (15.8 m) longline halibut-fishing vessel rolled over sank with the loss of one life near Port Chatham (59°12′30″N 151°47′00″W) on the south-central coast of Alaska. A United States Coast Guard helicopter rescued her three survivors.

=== 17 November ===
List of shipwrecks: 17 November 1990
Ship	State	Description
Osa Ghent	Liberia	The tug capsized and sank at Singapore. She was refloated on 23 November.

=== 22 November ===
List of shipwrecks: 22 November 1990
Ship	State	Description
Antares	United Kingdom	The 54-foot (16 m) fishing trawler was fishing in Bute Sound when her nets were snagged by the submerged submarine HMS Trenchant (Royal Navy). She was pulled down and sunk with the loss of all four crew.

=== 25 November ===
List of shipwrecks: 25 November 1990
Ship	State	Description
Pisces	United States	The fishing vessel burned and capsized in the Bering Sea. Her entire crew of five was rescued after abandoning ship in a life raft.
Winterhawk	United States	The 95-foot (29.0 m) fishing vessel sank in a storm in the Bering Sea. All five crew members were rescued from a life raft.

== December ==
=== 4 December ===
List of shipwrecks: 4 December 1990
Ship	State	Description
HDMS Sælen	Royal Danish Navy	The Tumleren-class submarine sank in the Kattegat off Hesselø. She was refloated on 17 December. Subsequently repaired and returned to service.

=== 19 December ===
List of shipwrecks: 19 December 1990
Ship	State	Description
Unknown speed boats	Eritrean Liberation Front	Eritrean War of Independence: Two speed boats were shelled and sunk during a battle with the minesweeper Paravan (Soviet Navy).

=== 22 December ===
List of shipwrecks: 22 December 1990
Ship	State	Description
Tuvia	Israel	The ferry capsized and sank off Haifa, Israel, killing 20 crew members of the aircraft carrier USS Saratoga (United States Navy), who were being transferred to that ship.

=== 27 December ===
List of shipwrecks: 27 December 1990
Ship	State	Description
Finn and Baltic	Finland	The Finnpusku combination capsized and sank off Hanko. Later raised, repaired and returned to service in 1991 as Botnia and Steel.

=== 28 December ===
List of shipwrecks: 28 December 1990
Ship	State	Description
Jarita	Norway	The cargo ship sank in the English Channel off Margate, Kent, United Kingdom, with the loss of one of her four crew.
Jessica B	United States	The 77-foot (23.5 m) fishing vessel was wrecked without loss of life in Kashega Bay (53°28′50″N 167°10′30″W) on the coast of Unalaska Island in the Aleutian Islands.

=== 31 December ===
List of shipwrecks: 31 December 1990
Ship	State	Description
Transformer	United States	The 32-foot (9.8 m) fishing vessel was destroyed by fire in Prince William Sound near Port Bainbridge (59°57′N 148°21′W), Alaska. The only person aboard survived and was rescued by the fishing vessel Serenity (United States).

== Unknown date ==
List of shipwrecks: Unknown date 1990
Ship	State	Description
Mr. J	United States	The crab processor – a former PCE-842-class patrol craft and auxiliary minelayer – was towed out into the Pacific Ocean and scuttled sometime in the 1990s.
Ramada al Salaam Hotel	Kuwait	Iraqi occupation of Kuwait: The floating hotel, a former cruise ship, was attacked by Iraqi forces and destroyed at her moorings. She was later scrapped.
USS Yancey	United States Navy	The decommissioned Andromeda-class attack cargo ship was sunk in the Atlantic Ocean off Morehead City, North Carolina, to form an artificial reef.
