= Squannit =

Squannit may refer to:

- Granny Squannit, a figure in Wampanoag folklore
- Squannit (moon), satellite of the asteroid Moshup
