= Moshup =

Moshup may refer to:

- 66391 Moshup, an asteroid
- Maushop, a figure in Wampanoag folklore
- Moshup Beach, a beach in Aquinnah, Massachusetts
