= 66391 Moshup =

Binary near-Earth asteroid

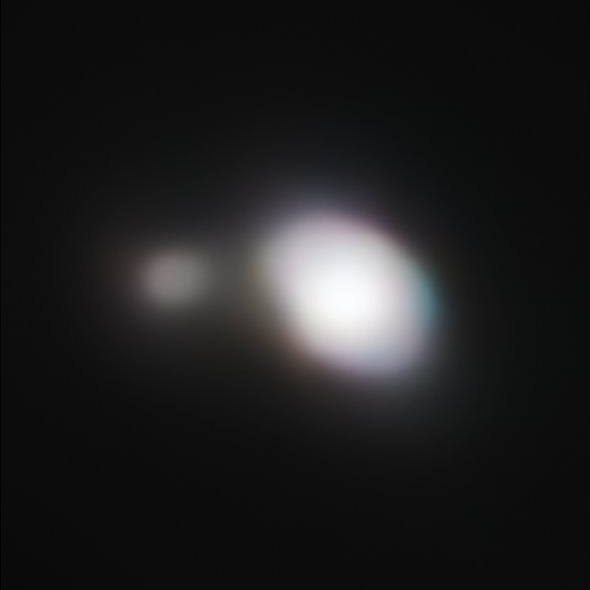
- Moshup and its satellite Squannit imaged by the Very Large Telescope's SPHERE instrument

Discovery
- Discovered by: LINEAR
- Discovery site: Lincoln Lab's ETS
- Discovery date: 20 May 1999

Designations
- Pronunciation: /ˈmɒʃʌp/
- Named after: Maushop (native American legend)
- Alternative designations: 1999 KW_{4}
- Minor planet category: Aten · NEO · PHA; Mercury-crosser; Venus-crosser

Orbital characteristics
- Epoch 4 September 2017 (JD 2458000.5)
- Uncertainty parameter 0
- Observation arc: 19.01 yr (6,942 days)
- Aphelion: 1.0845 AU
- Perihelion: 0.2000 AU
- Semi-major axis: 0.6422 AU
- Eccentricity: 0.6886
- Orbital period (sidereal): 0.51 yr (188 days)
- Mean anomaly: 359.03°
- Mean motion: 1° 54^{m} 54^{s} / day
- Inclination: 38.884°
- Longitude of ascending node: 244.91°
- Argument of perihelion: 192.62°
- Known satellites: 1 (Squannit /ˈskwɒnɪt/)
- Earth MOID: 0.0138 AU · 5.4 LD

Physical characteristics
- Dimensions: 1.532 × 1.495 × 1.347 km
- Mean diameter: 1.317±0.040 km
- Mass: (2.49±0.054)×10^{12} kg
- Mean density: 1.97±0.24 g/cm^{3}
- Synodic rotation period: 2.7650 h
- Geometric albedo: 0.26 (derived)
- Spectral type: SMASS=S; B–V=0.85±0.01; V–R=0.44±0.02; V–I=0.65±0.03
- Absolute magnitude (H): 16.5

66391 Moshup /ˈmɒʃʌp/, provisional designation 1999 KW_{4}, is a binary asteroid, classified as a near-Earth object and potentially hazardous asteroid of the Aten group, approximately 1.3 kilometers in diameter. It was discovered on 20 May 1999, by Lincoln Near-Earth Asteroid Research (LINEAR) at the Lincoln Laboratory's Experimental Test Site in Socorro, New Mexico, United States. It is a Mercury-crosser that comes extremely close to the Sun at a perihelion of 0.2 AU.

== Orbit ==
The asteroid orbits the Sun at a distance of 0.2–1.1 AU once every 6.18 months (188 days). Its orbit has an eccentricity of 0.69 and an inclination of 39° with respect to the ecliptic. A first precovery was taken by 2MASS at the Fred Lawrence Whipple Observatory in 1998, extending the body's observation arc by one year prior to its official discovery observation at Socorro.

As a potentially hazardous asteroid, it has an Earth minimum orbital intersection distance of 0.0138 AU (2,060,000 km), or 5.4 lunar distances. On 25 May 2036, it will pass 0.0155 AU (2,320,000 km) from Earth.

== Numbering and naming ==
This minor planet was numbered by the Minor Planet Center on 10 September 2003. It was named from Mohegan legend, after Moshup, a giant who lived in the coastal areas of New England. The asteroid's companion is named Squannit, after the wife of Moshup and a medicine woman of the Makiawisug (little people). The official naming citation was published by the Minor Planet Center on 27 August 2019 (M.P.C. 115894).

== Physical characteristics ==
In the SMASS classification, the asteroid a characterized as a stony S-type asteroid.

=== Satellite ===
Simulated animation of the Moshup binary system. The simulation speed is approx. 12,000 times real-time.

Moshup has a minor-planet moon orbiting it. The moon, named Squannit /ˈskwɒnɪt/, is approximately 360 metres in diameter, and orbits its primary every 16 hours at a mean distance of 2.6 kilometers. The presence of a companion was suggested by photometric observations made by Pravec and Šarounová and was confirmed by radar observations from Arecibo, announced on 23 May 2001 (also see below). Based on radar imaging, Squannit's dimensions are estimated to be 595 × 450 × 343 meters.

=== Diameter and shape ===
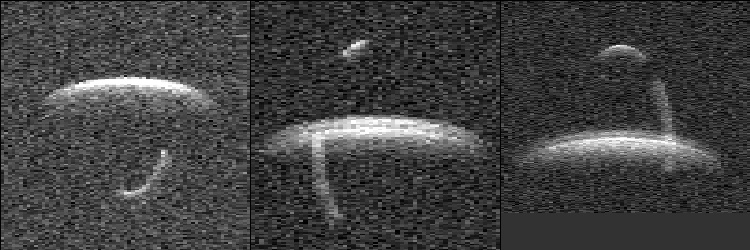
Radar images of Moshup and Squannit taken at Goldstone

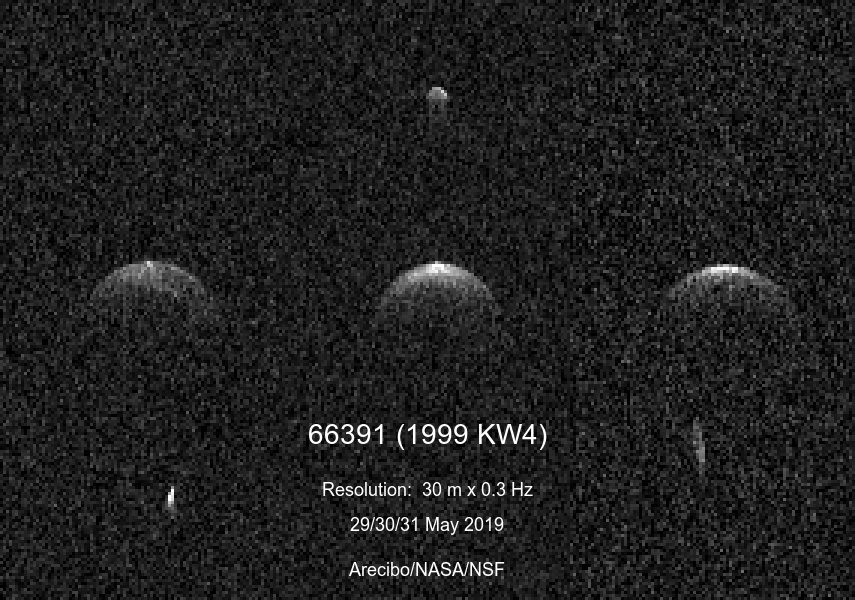
Collage of radar images taken at Arecibo in May 2019

According to radiometric observations from Arecibo Observatory, the asteroid has an effective mean diameter of 1.317 kilometers. The observations were taken from May 21–23, 2001, by Lance A. M. Benner, Steven J. Ostro, Jon D. Giorgini, Raymond F. Jurgens, Jean-Luc Margot and Michael C. Nolan.

The Collaborative Asteroid Lightcurve Link adopts a diameter of 1.3 kilometers and derives an albedo 0.26 with an absolute magnitude of 16.5.

The shapes of the two bodies and their dynamics are complex. With a dimension of approximately 1.42 × 1.36 × 1.18 kilometers for a simple triaxial ellipsoid, the asteroid has an oblate shape, which is dominated by an equatorial ridge at the body's potential-energy minimum. This bizarre property of the equatorial region means that it is close to breakup: raising a particle a meter above the surface would put it into orbit. As seen in the image above, the gravitational effects between the moon and the asteroid create a gigantic mountain extending in the equatorial plane around the entire asteroid. It was the first asteroid to be described as "muffin-shaped", which is now understood to be a very common shape for asteroids in critical rotation, including 101955 Bennu and 162173 Ryugu.

=== Lightcurves ===
During 19–27 June 2000, a rotational lightcurve of this asteroid was obtained from photometric observations by Petr Pravec and Lenka Šarounová at Ondřejov Observatory. Lightcurve analysis gave a rotation period of 2.7650 hours with a brightness variation of 0.12 magnitude (U=3).

== See also ==
- List of asteroid close approaches to Earth in 2019
- List of solar system objects by size
