= Oneco =

Sachem Oneco
- Owaneko

Sachem of the Mohegan
- Preceded by: Uncas
- Succeeded by: Caesar
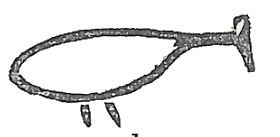
- Signature

Military service
- Allegiance: Mohegan
- Rank: Commander
- Battles/wars: King Phillip's War

Oneco (sometimes called Owaneko) was a sachem of the Mohegans in the Connecticut Colony and the son of Uncas. During King Philip's War (1675–78), he was a battlefield commander and has been credited as one of the executioners of Canonchet. Later, he was the lead petitioner in a legal case that tested whether the Mohegan sachemate was a political entity equal to The Crown.

== Biography ==
Oneco, the son of Uncas, served as war chief of the Mohegans during King Philip's War, distinguishing himself in battle. His service to the colonial cause during the war made him an important ally and he was given the right to sell his prisoners as slaves to New England settlers.

In 1676, Oneco joined in the execution of Canonchet, the Narragansett commander who had led the defense of the great swamp fortress. After the Pequot leader Robin Cassacinamon shot Canonchet, Oneco beheaded him and then quartered his body. Canonchet's death at the hands of Oneco was notable as Canonchet's father, Miantonomoh, had been killed by Oneco's father, Uncas, in 1643. (Note: According to a different account, however, it was Uncas' brother who killed Miantonomoh, Uncas thereafter partially cannibalizing him.)

After Uncas' death, Oneco succeeded to the leadership of the Mohegans. He was, in turn, succeeded by his own son, Caesar.

== 1703 land claims case ==
In 1703, the Mohegans found themselves in the midst of a property dispute with the Connecticut Colony. The colony claimed land traditional to the Mohegans on the basis of a 1699 sale executed by Oneco to the son of Nathaniel Foote. The legality of the sale, however, was questioned as Oneco had reportedly been intoxicated at the time it occurred. Samuel Mason, the son of John Mason, had succeeded his father as protector of the Mohegan lands – an office into which he had originally been commissioned by the great sachem Uncas – and organized an appeal to the Great and General Court of Connecticut, which was rebuffed. At Mason's urging, Oneco addressed a final appeal directly to Queen Anne in which he explained to her his divine right as sachem. With his authority originating directly from the gods, as opposed to the Crown, Oneco argued that the sachemate was a legal entity equal to the English monarchy. According to Oneco, his ancestors had been given a sacred pipe by the gods as a symbol of their authority and, as a testament to their friendship towards the English, now stored it in the same location as they kept a ceremonial sword given to them by Charles II of England. Oneco's argument was novel for describing a peer-to-peer relationship with the Crown and invoking the receipt of a diplomatic gift as proof of it. (Note: Oneco was joined in his petition to the Crown by several colonial landowners who also had various property disputes with the Connecticut government. Nicholas Hallam traveled to London in 1703, and again in 1704, to represent the petitioners.)

Oneco's letter was considered by the Board of Trade who referred the matter to the Attorney-General who, in a written opinion, determined Oneco's property claim had probable legal validity:

[Her Majesty] ... may command ye Governors of that Corporation not to oppress those Indians or to deprive them of their right, but to doe them right notwithstanding the Act made by them to dispossess them, which I am of opinion was illegall and void.

A royal commission was thereafter convened, with Massachusetts Bay governor Joseph Dudley at its head, to inquire into the matter. In a protest, the Connecticut government rejected the right of the Crown to intervene in what it viewed as its internal affairs, refused to appear in front of the inquiry, and prohibited all citizens of Connecticut from giving testimony. Nonetheless, on August 24, 1705, the commission unanimously ruled in favor of the Mohegans and ordered the return of land between New London and Norwich to tribal control.
