= Mohegan-Pequot language =

Eastern Algonquian language

Mohegan-Pequot
- Mohiks-Piqut Uyôtowáwôk
- Native to: United States
- Region: Southern New England, Eastern Long Island
- Ethnicity: Mohegan, Montauk, Niantic, Pequot, and Shinnecock
- Extinct: July 18, 1908, with the death of Fidelia Fielding
- Revival: beginning 2018
- Language family: Algic: Algonquian; Eastern; Mohegan-Pequot
- Writing system: Latin script

Language codes
- ISO 639-3: xpq
- Glottolog: pequ1242
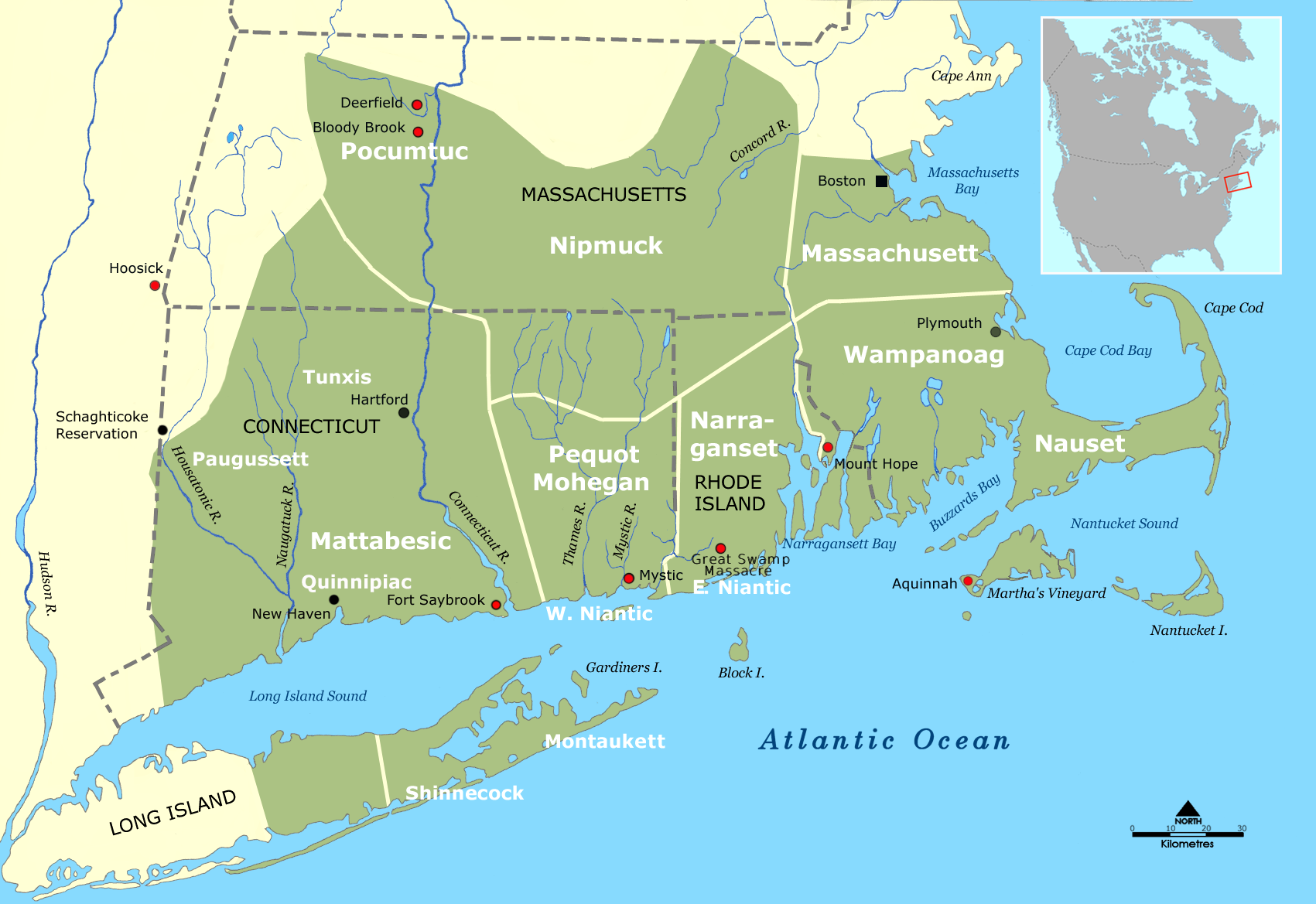
- The location of the Mohegan, Pequot, Montaukett, Niantic, and Shinnecock, and their neighbors, c. 1600

Mohegan-Pequot (also known as Mohegan-Pequot-Montauk, Secatogue, and Shinnecock-Poosepatuck) is an Algonquian language formerly spoken, and currently being reclaimed, by the Indigenous peoples of southern present-day New England and eastern Long Island. Dialects in New England included Mohegan, Pequot, and Niantic; and on Long Island, Montaukett and Shinnecock.

== History ==
The language was documented as early as the 17th century.

"In 1690, a Pequot vocabulary list was compiled by Rev. James Noyes in Groton. In 1717, Experience Mayhew, a Congregational Minister translated the Lord's Prayer into Mohegan-Pequot. Ezra Stiles, president of Yale University collected Pequot linguistic data in Groton in 1762."

One of the key figures in the legacy of the Mohegan language is Samson Occom (1723–1792), an 18th-century Mohegan minister and scholar. Though his surviving works are primarily in English, Occom was fluent in Mohegan and is believed to have used the language in his preaching. In 2022, Dartmouth College formally repatriated Occom’s personal papers to the Mohegan Tribe.

Another important tribal member was Gladys Tantaquidgeon, who was the tribe's medicine woman from 1916 until her death in 2005. She too assisted greatly in maintaining the Mohegan culture, as she collected thousands of tribal documents and artifacts. These documents were of critical importance to supporting the tribe's documentation for its case for federal recognition, which was approved in 1994.

== Revival ==
As of 2024, there are approximately 2,400 enrolled Mohegan tribal members (these figures vary by source). The Mohegan language has not been spoken conversationally for approximately 100 years; the last native speaker, Cits Pátunáhshô (Flying Bird), known in English as Fidelia Fielding, died in 1908. However, it is currently in the process of active revitalization. Fielding, a descendant of Chief Uncas and a primary source on the language, left behind four diaries, now being used in the process of restoring the language. Many of the dictionaries circulating are based on John Dyneley Prince and Frank G. Speck's interpretation of testimony by Fielding. In addition to her written contributions, Fielding practiced a traditional Mohegan lifestyle and was the last person to live in the traditional log dwelling.

The Mashantucket Pequot Museum and Research Center collection includes a 1992 menu "which attempts to translate such words as hamburger and hot dog into Mohegan-Pequot."

As of 2010, the Shinnecock and Unkechaug nations of Long Island, New York, had begun work with the State University of New York at Stony Brook, Southampton Campus, to revive their languages, or dialects of the above.

By 2012, the Mohegan Language Project had created lessons, a dictionary, and other online learning materials to revive their language. The project also has a complete grammar in the works, which has been put together by Stephanie Fielding. The primary goal of the project is for the next generation of Mohegan people to be fluent.

Prayers from the Baháʼí Faith have been translated into the Mohegan-Pequot language.

"It is a sacred obligation," says the Golden Hill Paugussett Chief, Big Eagle. "Indian people must keep their languages alive. If the language is not spoken, it must be made to live again."

== Phonology ==
=== Consonants ===
Mohegan-Pequot consonant phonemes
	Labial	Alveolar	Post- alveolar	Velar		Glottal
	Labial	Alveolar	Post- alveolar	plain	lab.	Glottal
Nasal	m (m)	n (n)				
Stop	p (p)	t (t)		k (k)	kʷ (q)	
Affricate			tʃ (c)			
Fricative		s (s)	ʃ (sh)			h (h)
Approximant			j (y)		w (w)	

/n/ is realized as [ŋ] before [k].

=== Vowels ===
==== Simple vowels ====
	Front	Central	Back
Close	iː (i)		uː (o)
Mid		ə (u)	ɔ̃ː (ô)
Open		a aː (a á)	

The nasal vowel /ɔ̃/ can range to an oral [ɔ]. ⟨a⟩ written with an acute accent (⟨á⟩) represents a long vowel /aː/.

==== Diphthongs ====
	Central	Back
Close		au
Mid		ɔ̃i
Open	ai	

== Orthography ==
Mohegan-Pequot was traditionally an oral language with no standardized writing system. The language was passed down entirely through spoken word. The only significant historic writings have been produced by European colonizers who interacted with the speakers of Mohegan-Pequot.

In the 21st century, as part of the revitalization effort, a practical orthography was created to represent the Mohegan language using the Latin alphabet. The foundational source for this work was the set of four phonetic diaries left behind by Fielding.

The dictionaries, grammar books, and other materials that are being developed in recent decades as part of the effort to revitalize Mohegan-Pequot have adopted and used a standardized Latin orthography consisting of twelve consonants and six vowels.

Consonants
Sound	Phonetic	Mohegan-Pequot examples	Gloss	English equivalent
c	[dʒ] ~ [tʃ]	nutcôhtam	'I want'	beach
h	[h]	mohiks	'Mohegan, Mohegan Indian'	hi
k	[g] ~ [k]	ôkatuq	'cloud'	geese, ski
m	[m]	pôcum	'cranberry'	man
n	[n]	nupáw	'five'	name
p	[b] ~ [p]	páyaq	'ten'	spit
q	[k^{w}] ~ [kw]	sôyôqat piyámáq	'It is cold' 'fish'	queen
s	[s] ~ [z] [z] beginning of a word [z] between two vowels [s] ~ [ʃ] in clusters sk, sp, sq	nis pahsukôsq	'two' 'board, floorboard'	miss
sh	[ʃ]	nihsh ôtshohkôk	'eel' 'legend, myth'	shoreline
t	[d] ~ [t]	manto	'God'	do, stop
w	[w]	wacuw	'hill, mountain'	weasel
y	[j]	nut'huyô	'I call him'	mayor

Vowels
Sound	Phonetic	Mohegan-Pequot examples	Gloss	English equivalent
a	[ə] ~ [a]	ahki	'land, Earth'	handle
á	[aː]	yáw	'four'	father
i	[ɪ] ~ [i]	maci	'bad, wicked'	pin
o	[uː] ~ [o]	nupotawá	'I make a fire'	obey, book
ô	[ɔ̃:] ~ [ɔː]	kôq	'porcupine'	bonbon
u	[ʌ]	shwut	'third'	cut

== Morphology ==
=== Nouns ===
Nouns in Mohegan have two forms: animate and inanimate. They are further distinguished by number. Animate nouns include people, animals, heavenly bodies (sun, moon, stars, but not clouds), and spirits. There are other items that fall into the category of animate such as certain cultural items and plants, but it is not known why these items are considered animate. It is something that is simply learned and memorized. One way to help identify if a noun is animate or inanimate is to look at its plural form. Plural animate nouns typically end in -k while plural inanimate nouns end in -sh.

Animate nouns have four forms: singular, plural, obviative and locative. The obviate form is used when there are two or more animate third person nouns in a sentence to mark the noun which is less salient (less relevant to the discourse). The unmarked noun is called the proximate, which is more salient/relevant to the discourse. The obviative is also used to mark a third-person possessed noun, with the possessor considered as the proximate, even if the possessed noun is more salient than its possessor. The locative is used to show where something is spatially. There is no obviative form for inanimate nouns, and neither the obviative nor the locative have plural forms (plurality is known through context).

Animate Nouns (with regular stems)	Mohegan Form	English Translation
Singular	winay	old woman
Plural	winayak	old women
Obviative	winayah	old woman/women
Locative	winayuk	at the old woman/women

Inanimate Nouns (with regular stems)	Mohegan Form	English Translation
Singular	wacuw	hill
Plural	wacuwash	hills
Locative	wacuwuk	at the hill/on the hill

Verbs

Verbs in Mohegan come in several forms. Independent verbs exist in four forms: inanimate intransitive, animate intransitive, transitive inanimate and transitive animate. There is also the conjunct form which does not carry the affixes (used to clarify person) that the aforementioned hold.

== Person, number and gender ==
Person

Mohegan animate intransitive verbs show who the subject is by utilizing affixes. Singular forms have prefixes, but third person (singular and plural) only have suffixes. In the plural forms there are inclusive and exclusive suffixes; the inclusive we includes the person who is speaking as well as the person they are talking to whereas the exclusive we does not include the person the speaker is talking to. When an animate intransitive verb stem ends in a long vowel (á, i, o or ô) the third person singular does not take a final -w, and in the third person plural these same verbs take -k as an ending in lieu of - wak.

Independent Verbs (animate intransitive)
Person	Mohegan	English Translation
1st person singular	**nu**kumotu	I steal
2nd person singular	**ku**kumotu	you steal
3rd person singular	kumotu**w**	he/she steals
3rd person obviative	kumotu**h**	he/she (obviative) steals
1st person plural exclusive	**nu**kumotu**mun**	we (I and he/she) steal
1st person plural inclusive	**ku**kumotu**mun**	we (I and you) steal
2nd person plural	**ku**kumotu**mô**	you (more than one) steal
3rd person plural	kumotu**wak**	they steal

*affixes indicated in bold type

Independent Verbs (animate intransitive w/long vowel ending)
Person	Mohegan	English Translation
1st person singular	**nu**yáhshá	I breathe
2nd person singular	**ku**yáhshá	you breathe
3rd person singular	yáhshá	he/she breathes
3rd person obviative	yáshá**h**	they (obviative) breathe
1st person plural exclusive	**nu**yáhshá**mun**	we (I and he/she) breathe
1st person plural inclusive	**ku**yáhshá**mun**	we (I and you) breathe
2nd person plural	**ku**yáhshá**mô**	you (more than one) breathe
3rd person plural	yáhshá**k**	they breathe

*affixes indicated in bold type

Numbers

Cardinal		Ordinal	
nuqut	one	nikôni	first
nis	two	nahahtôwi	second
shwi	three	shwut	third
yáw	four	yáwut	fourth
nupáw	five	nupáwut	fifth
qutôsk	six	qutôskut	sixth
nisôsk	seven	nisôskut	seventh
shwôsk	eight	shwôskut	eighth
pásukokun	nine	pásukokunut	ninth
páyaq	ten	páyaqut	tenth

== Space ==
Locative case

The locative case is used to show where something is. Mohegan utilizes the suffix -uk to indicate spatial relationships, which can be compared to the English prepositions on, at, and in. In Mohegan there is no plural form to go with the obviative and the locative: the same form is used for singular and plural with the difference being distinguished by context.

Mohegan	English Translation
cáhqin	house
cáhqinash	houses
cáhqinuk	in the house/houses

Absentative case

The absentative case is used to when referencing a person who has died (this includes any property that they left behind). This is accomplished by adding a suffix to either his/her name, title or the property.

Absentative
	Mohegan	English Translation
singular	nokunsi	my late grandfather
plural	nokunsuk	my late grandfathers
obviative singular	wokunsah	his late grandfather
obviative plural	wokunsukah	his late grandfathers
departed's possession singular	mushoyi	my late father's boat
departed's possessions plural	mushoyuk	my late father's boats

*suffix indicated by bold type

The following example shows the absentative case in use:

Niswi nusihsuk wikôtamak áposuhutut.

'Both of my late uncles enjoyed cooking.'

== Syntax ==
=== Possession ===
In Mohegan, there are two types of possession, alienable possession and inalienable possession. Nouns receive different marking depending on the relationship between the possessor and the possessed noun. If the possessed noun is connected (physically or sometimes metaphorically) to the possessed noun it is considered inalienable possession. For example in the phrase "the man's hand", the hand is possessed inalienably because it is inseparable from the man. Inalienable possession can also be metaphorical; for example, in the phrase "the man's mother", the mother is possessed inalienably because of a cultural perception of kinship as a "strong" connection. Inalienable nouns must always receive marking. If the possessor owns the possessed noun, but is not physically attached to it, it is considered alienable possession. In the phrase "the man's house", the house is possessed alienably because the house is not attached to the man.

Nouns pertaining to kinship and body parts are always classified as inalienable, but there are some terms that do not fall under either of these umbrellas that must be classified as inalienable, such as the noun home. Various affixes are used to denote inalienability and different affixes are used to differentiate animate/inanimate and singular/plural. Additionally, when a term requires possession but the possessor is unclear or unknown it is marked with a prefix that indicates an indefinite possessor.

The language also distinguishes between different forms of the first-person plural, separating inclusive ("we" including the person being addressed) from exclusive ("we" excluding the person being addressed). These distinctions are marked through specific combinations of affixes.

In the case of third-person possession involving animate nouns, Mohegan employs a grammatical feature known as obviation. This is used when one third person possesses another third-person entity, allowing speakers to identify which person is more central to the conversation. In such cases, an additional suffix is used to indicate that the possessed noun is obviative, or secondary in focus.

Inalienable Possession - Animate Singular
Person	Mohegan	English Translation
1st person singular	nutônihs	my daughter
2nd person singular	kutônihs	your daughter
3rd person singular	wutônihsah	his/her daughter
1st person plural exclusive	nutônihsun	our (exclusive) daughter
1st person plural inclusive	kutônihsun	our (inclusive) daughter
2nd person plural	kutônihsuw	your (plural) daughter
3rd person plural	wutônihsuwôwah	their daughter
indefinite possessor	mutônihs	an unknown person's daughter

Inalienable Possession - Inanimate Singular
Person	Mohegan	English Translation
1st person singular	nusit	my foot
2nd person singular	kusit	your foot
3rd person singular	wusit	his/her foot
1st person plural exclusive	nusitun	our (exclusive) foot
1st person plural inclusive	kusitun	our (inclusive) foot
2nd person plural	kusituw	your (plural) foot
3rd person plural	wusituw	their foot
indefinite possessor	musit	an unknown person's foot

The locative (-uk) and obviate (-ah) suffixes are added to the 1st, 2nd, and 3rd person singular forms. Whether the word is singular or plural should be suggested in the content of the sentence. The obviate affixes only go on animate nouns.

When a possessed noun is plural it must be shown. With an animate noun then suffix -ak is combined with the possessive ending (with the exception of third person singular and third person plural, where the plural is the same as the singular).

Inalienable Possession - Animate Plural
Person	Mohegan	English Translation
1st person singular	nutônihsak	my daughters
2nd person singular	kutônihsak	your daughters
3rd person singular	wutônihsah	his/her daughters
1st person plural exclusive	nutônihsunônak	our (exclusive) daughters
1st person plural inclusive	kutônihsunônak	our (inclusive) daughters
2nd person plural	kutônihsuwôwak	your (plural) daughters
3rd person plural	wetônihsuwôwah	their daughters

Inalienable Possession - Inanimate Plural
Person	Mohegan	English Translation
1st person singular	nusitash	my feet
2nd person singular	kusitash	your feet
3rd person singular	wusitash	their (obviative) foot
1st person plural exclusive	nusitunônash	our (exclusive) feet
1st person plural inclusive	kusitunônash	our (inclusive) feet
2nd person plural	kusituwôwash	your (plural) feet
3rd person plural	wusituwôwash	their feet
indefinite possessor	musitash	an unknown person's feet

*affixes on all charts are marked by bold type

Clause combining

In Mohegan grammar verbs that are in a dependent clause are said to be in the conjunct order. Conjunct verbs have the same numbers of persons for each verb, but they do not have prefixes, only suffixes. In turn, all of the person information is at the end of the word.

Conjunct Verbs: Animate Intransitives
Person	Mohegan	English Translation
1st person singular	yáhsháyôn	that I breathe
2nd person singular	yáhsháyan	that you breathe
3rd person singular	yáhshát	that he/she breathes
1st person plural (incl & excl)	yáhsháyak	that we breathe
2nd person plural	yáhsháyáq	that you (more than one) breathe
3rd person plural	yáhsháhutut	that they breathe
3rd person plural participle	yáhshácik	those who breathe
indefinite subject	yáhshámuk	that someone breathes

*suffixes on chart marked by bold type

Example: Mô yáyuw maci ákacuyǒn.

Translation: 'It was so bad that I am ashamed.'

When in the conjunct form if the first vowel of the word is a short vowel, that is /a/ or /u/, it changes to a long /á/.

Transitive verbs with inanimate objects take only a suffix as well. The suffix varies based on the ending of the stem.

For stems that end in -m- or -n- the suffixes are as follows:

1st person singular: -ôn

2nd person singular: -an

3rd person singular: -k

1st person plural: -ak

2nd person plural: -áq

3rd person plural: -hutut

3rd person plural participle: -kik

Indefinite subject (passive): -uk

For stems that end in -o- the suffixes are as follows:

1st person singular: -yôn

2nd person singular: -yan

3rd person singular: -ôk

1st person plural: -yak

2nd person plural: -yáq

3rd person plural: -w'hutut

3rd person plural participle: -ôkik

Indefinite subject (passive): -muk

For stems that end in -u- the suffixes are as follows:

1st person singular: -wôn

2nd person singular: -wan

3rd person singular: -k

1st person plural: -wak

2nd person plural: -wáq

3rd person plural: -'hutut

3rd person plural participle: -kik

Indefinite subject (passive): -muk

== See also ==
- Mohegan people
- Pequot
- Montaukett
- Niantic people
- Shinnecock Indian Nation
