= Diosa del Mar =

American ship

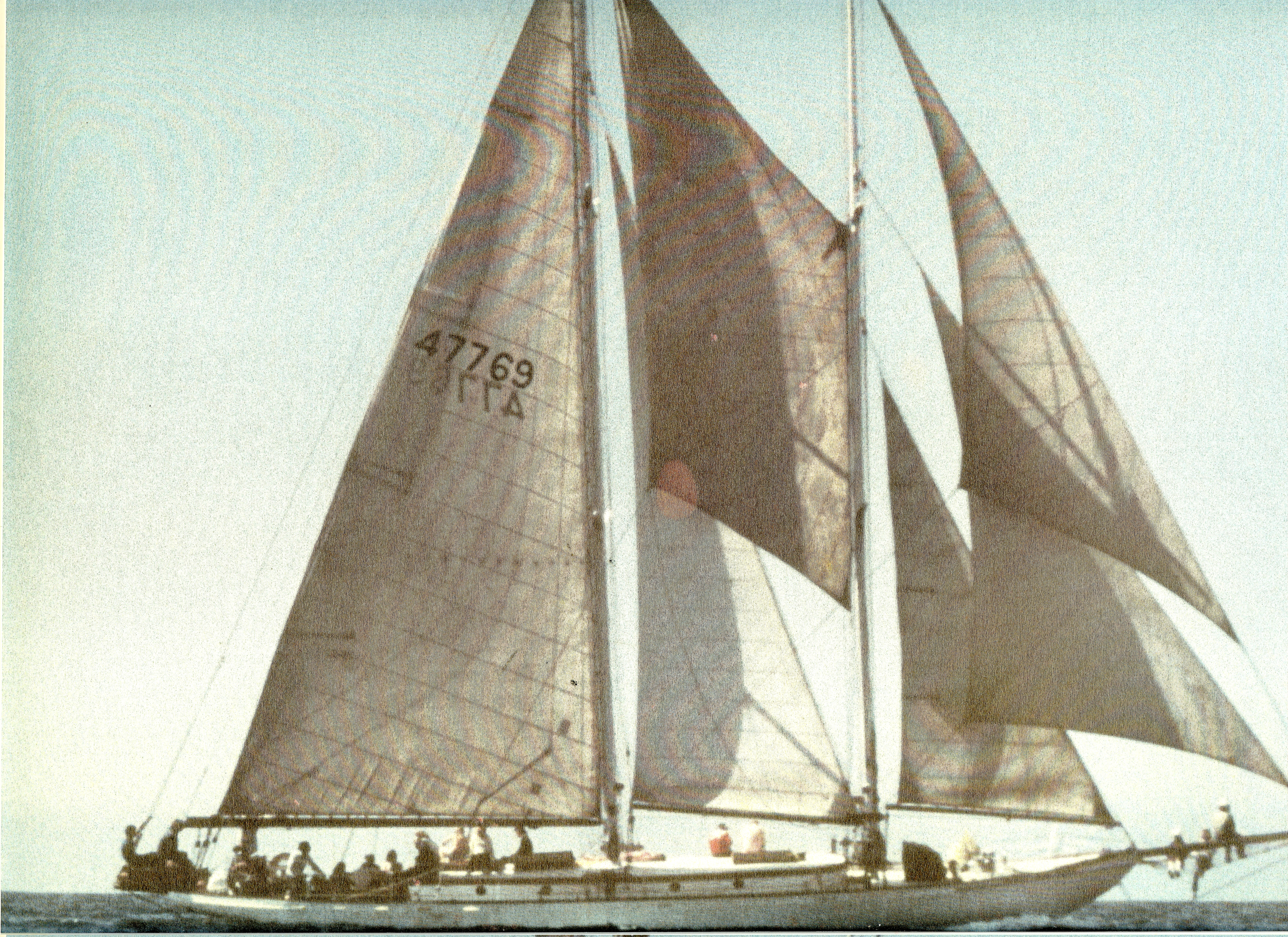
- Diosa del Mar under sail in 1979

History

United States
- Name: Uncas
- Owner: Vanderbilt family
- Builder: A.C. Brown and Sons, Tottenville, New York
- Launched: 1898
- Renamed: Wal Gar, Bonnie Doone, and Diosa del Mar
- Honors and awards: 1979 Serena Cup: fastest schooner in the Newport to Ensenada Race
- Fate: Sunk at Catalina Island, July 30, 1990
- Notes: Burned and rebuilt in 1927

General characteristics
- Type: Schooner
- Tons burthen: 30 tons
- Length: 66 ft 6 in (20.27 m)
- Draft: 6 ft 7 in (2.01 m)
- Propulsion: Sterling gas engine (1916), GM diesel engine (1925), 6-cylinder Chrysler engine (1951)
- Sail plan: 3,321 sq ft (308.5 m^{2}) sail area

Diosa del Mar (Spanish: Goddess of the Sea) was a wooden schooner that sank off of the coast of Catalina Island at 2:25 pm on July 30, 1990.

== Overview ==
The two-masted wooden schooner was designed by A. Cary Smith and built in 1898 by the firm of A.C. Brown and Sons of Tottenville, New York. It was originally christened Uncas after the famous chief Uncas of the Mohegan tribe. Through various owners, the name was subsequently changed to Wal Gar, Bonnie Doone, and finally Diosa del Mar. In Lloyd's Register of American Yachts it appears as Bonnie Doone until finally disappearing from the registry in 1959 under the ownership of a Dr. Irving E. Laby in Los Angeles, California.

The yacht was originally built as a staysail craft for the children of the wealthy Vanderbilt family. As originally built she weighed 30 tons, was 66 feet 6 inches (20.27 m) long, had a total sail area of 3,321 square feet (308.5 m^{2}), and a draft of 6 feet 7 inches (2.01 m). The Diosa del Mar was perfectly capable of deep ocean travel. Following the installation in 1916 of a Sterling gas engine, the vessel's capabilities were quite advanced. By 1925 it sported a full keel (modified from her original keel with auxiliary centerboard) and a GM diesel engine.

According to Lloyd's, the Diosa del Mar was burned and rebuilt in 1927. By 1951 it had been refitted with a six-cylinder Chrysler engine and was operating out of Newport Beach, California.

In 1979 the vessel won the Serena Cup as the fastest schooner in the Newport to Ensenada Race (California to Mexico). Subsequently, Diosa del Mar sailed from Los Angeles to Hilo, Hawaii, where the schooner operated as a charter until 1982 under the ownership of Roy Eugene "Gene" Deshler and Margo Deshler along with their two children. After returning to Los Angeles, she placed second in the Newport to Ensenada race of 1983. For most of the rest of its life the vessel operated as a charter out of Long Beach, California.

The yacht's demise came about near the end of the tenth annual Firemen's Race in 1990 off the coast of southern California. A small powerboat failed to spot the racing Diosa del Mar. The powerboat hove out of the Isthmus of Catalina, cutting in front of the doomed ship. Rather than risk injury or death to the driver and passengers on the smaller craft, Diosa del Mar's owner and captain Eddie Weinberg steered hard to starboard, crashing his ship against Ship Rock. The wreckage of the schooner was a favorite of divers for many years before finally breaking up beneath the waters of the Pacific Ocean. On July 2, 2012, captain Eddie Weinberg died at the Veterans Hospital in Long Beach.

The salvaged stern and mast from the Diosa Del Mar was on display at the Isthmus on Catalina Island, California, for a number of years.

== Shipwreck location ==
The wreck of Diosa del Mar is located at 33°27′46″N 118°29′31″W. Ship Rock is located 3 miles (4.8 km) east of the Isthmus on Catalina Island. The keel was salvaged.

Numerous people over the years, since the sinking of the Diosa Del Mar in 1990, had attempted to raise and salvage the keel of the boat. It took two attempts, and about 17 trips to Catalina to move masts and debris in preparation to raise the keel off the rocks and reef, and towed to Long Beach Harbor, California. The eventual successful salvaging operation in 1996 was "the talk" of the maritime groups and the news media in the Los Angeles Basin, since there had been so many failed attempts over the years.

== Gallery ==
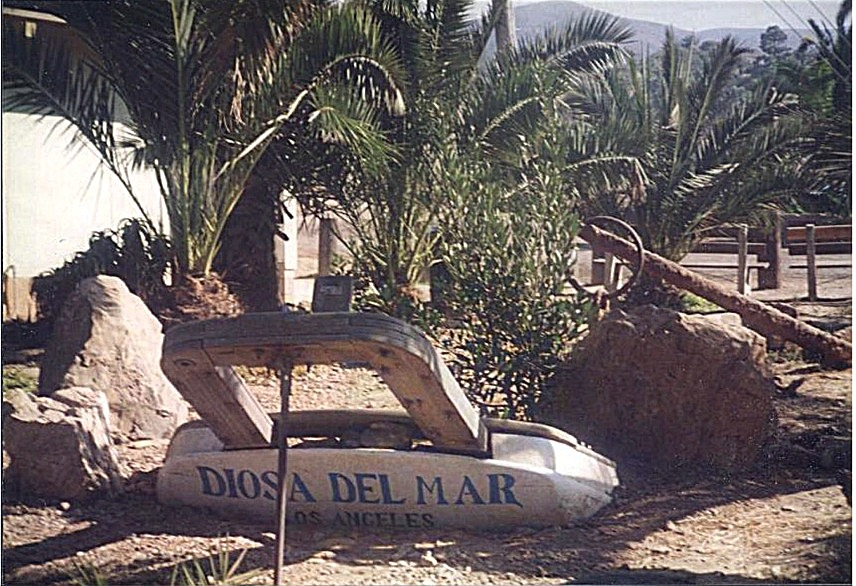
Stern and mast at the Isthmus on Catalina Island, California.

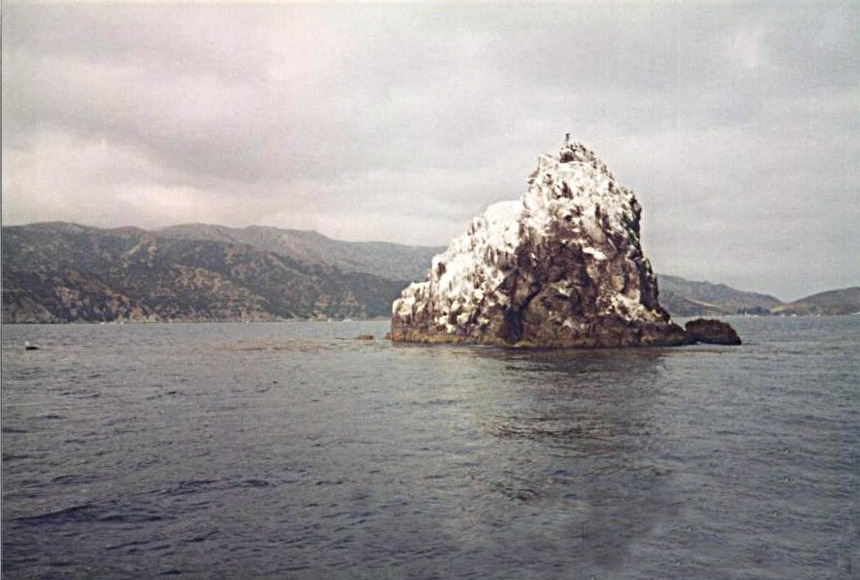
Ship Rock is located 3 miles (4.8 km) east of the Isthmus on Catalina Island, California.

Keel on land.
