= Cochegan Rock =

Significant boulder in Connecticut, USA

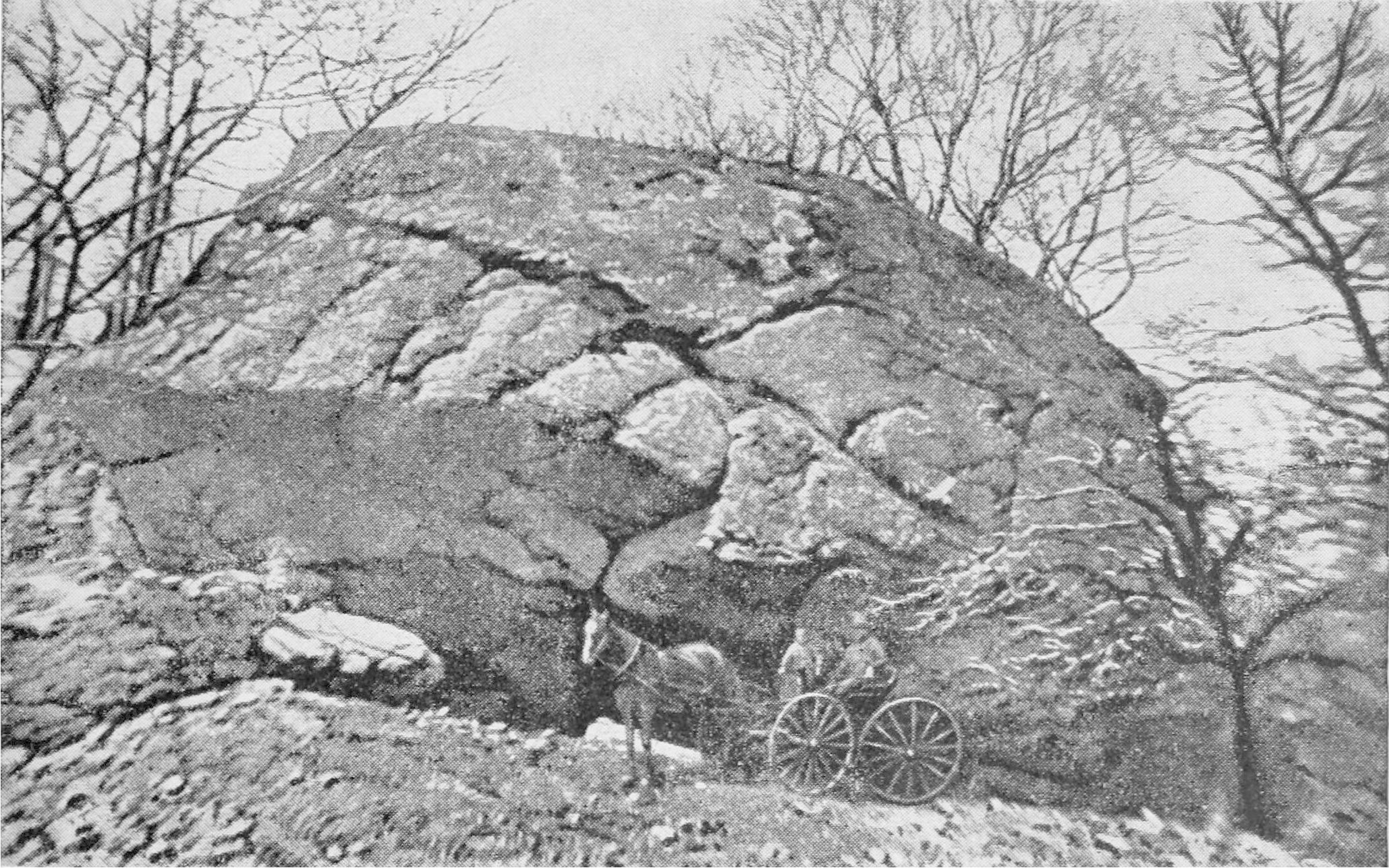

- Location within Connecticut
- Location: Montville, Connecticut, United States
- Coordinates: 41°28′13″N 72°07′13″W
- Administrator: The Mohegan Tribe
- Website: Cochegan Rock

Cochegan Rock is the largest known boulder in Connecticut. Located in Montville, it is about 54 feet long, 58 feet wide, and 50 feet high. It is estimated to weigh around 7,000 tons.

== Geologic history ==
Cochegan Rock is a large granite glacial erratic.

== History ==
Cochegan Rock is considered a sacred site by the local Mohegan Tribe, and is known for being the place where the Sachem Uncas conducted meetings with his council in the 1600s.

== Location ==
Cochegan Rock is located off of Raymond Hill Road and is about 900 feet from Interstate 395 in Montville, Connecticut. The property the rock is located was given to the Connecticut Rivers Council of the Boy Scouts of America by a local family in the 1960's before being reaquired by the Mohegan Tribe in 2007.

== See also ==
- List of individual rocks
