= Squannit (moon) =

Asteroid moon of 66391 Moshup

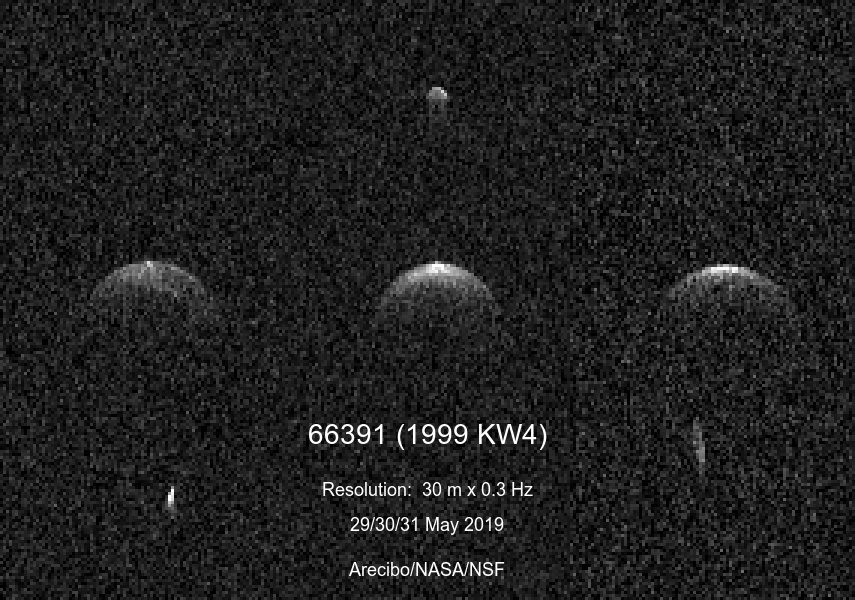
- Radar of Moshup and Squannit taken at Arecibo Observatory in May 2019

Discovery
- Discovered by: Petr Pravec; Lenka Kotková; Lance A. M. Benner; Steven J. Ostro; Jon D. Giorgini; Raymond F. Jurgens; Jean-Luc Margot; Michael C. Nolan
- Discovery date: May 21, 2001

Orbital characteristics
- Periapsis: 2,547 m
- Apoapsis: 2,549 m
- Satellite of: 66391 Moshup

Physical characteristics
- Mean diameter: 0.451 ± 0.027 km
- Mass: (1.35±0.24)×10^{11} kg
- Mean density: 2.8 g/cm^{3}
- Synodic rotation period: 0.7259 ± 0.0015 d

Squannit (officially (66391) Moshup I Squannit, formerly sometimes 1999 KW_{4} Beta) is a moon of the near-Earth asteroid 66391 Moshup. Its estimated diameter is about 450 meters. The moon and its parent asteroid are the closest known binary system to the Sun.

== Discovery and naming ==
The discovery of Squannit was made by a Czech astronomer team led by Petr Pravec and Lenka Kotková (-Šarounová) from the Ondřejov suggested by photometric observations on June 19, 2000, which was later confirmed by radar observations from the Arecibo Observatory by a team led by Steven J. Ostro until the official discovery on May 21, 2001.

The discovery was announced by the International Astronomical Union (IAU) two days later on 23 May 2001. On August 27, 2019, the Minor Planet Center announced, that in analogy to the parent asteroid it was given the name Squannit, after the wife of Moshup, who was a medicine woman of the Makiawisug (little people) people.

== Track properties ==
Squannite orbits the common barycenter on a right-hand and retrograde, almost circular orbit at an average distance of 2.548 km from the planetoid, which corresponds to 3.9 Moshup radii or 11.3 squannite radii. The moon takes 17 hours 25.2 minutes to complete one orbit, which corresponds to about 259 orbits in a Moshup year. The orbital eccentricity is 0.0004, the orbit is inclined 156.1° relative to the equator of Moshup. This puts the Moon well within Moshup's Hill sphere of 22 km.

In this binary system, a month lasts 6.3 days.

== Physical properties ==
=== Size and structure ===
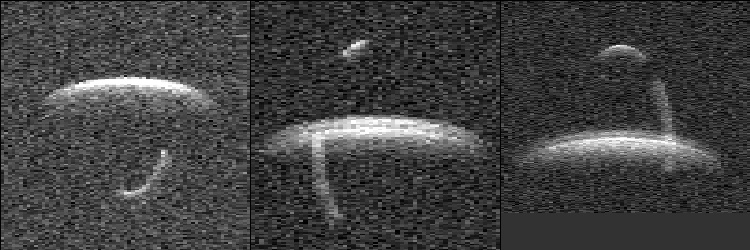
(66391) Moshup and Squannit.

Moshup and Squannit based on radar observations.

The observations so far indicate an irregularly shaped, elongated body; the most accurate diameter determination (geometric mean) is 451 ± 27 meters. Regarding the exact dimensions, the most accurate value is 0.571 × 0.463 × 0.349 km. The discovery of the moon had no significant impact on the size determination of the parent asteroid, According to current estimates, this has a size of about 1.3 km. Squannit has about a third of the diameter of Moshup, Therefore, its density of 2.8 g/cm^{3} is assumed to be much higher than that of Moshup, which is presumably a so-called rubble pile. Accordingly, Squannit should be more compact than the parent asteroid. Both bodies are believed to have been formed by a collision of a protoasteroid with another asteroid. The differences in composition could be due to the phenomenon of libration.

Based on the average diameter of 451 meters, this results in a surface area of approximately 0.64 km^{2} (0.25 sq mi). Squannit is 2.5 magnitudes dimmer than Moshup.

=== Rotation ===
Squannit rotates bound once on its axis every 17 hours and 25.2 minutes, with its long axis aligned with Moshup. This means that the asteroid completes about 259 rotations in one Moshup year.

== See also ==
- List of asteroids
- Minor-planet moon
