= Maushop =

Mythical figure in Wampanoag Folklore

Maushop or Moshup (/ˈmɒʃʌp/) is a mythical hero and giant from Wampanoag and Mohegan folklore. He is said to have several companions, including a giant frog and his wife Granny Squannit.

== Mythology ==
Maushop served as an explanation for geographical locations. According to legend, he came from Aquinnah on Martha's Vineyard and lived there from before the Wampanoag. Maushop was so large that his diet consisted mainly of whales. To catch them, he threw boulders into the water to make stepping stones. During a celebration, he emptied his pipe ashes into the ocean, and they became Nantucket.

At one point, a crab bites his toe causing him to stomp around, leaving large footprints in the ground. Moshup's Rock is named for this story, before Christian missionaries renamed it to "Devil's Footprint."

Maushop was seen as a provider for the Wampanoag, teaching them how to hunt and fish. The Wampanoag apparently became too reliant on him, so he left so they would learn how to survive on their own.

== Eponymy ==
66391 Moshup is an asteroid named after the giant.
