= Pasithea (ship) =

1971 Greek carrier ship, disappeared 1990

Pasithea was an ore-bulk-oil carrier that disappeared during Typhoon Vernon off of Kashima, Japan in August 1990. At the time of her loss, she was at the end of a voyage from Australia, with a cargo of iron ore, and anchored off shore on 1 August. Her last communication occurred on 4 August, shortly after getting under way to ride out the storm further off shore.

Pasithea was built in 1971 by Hitachi Shipbuilding Mukaishima - Onomichi, Japan, had a deadweight tonnage of 155,407, and was sailing under the flag of Greece at the time of her loss.

All crew 31 people lost their lives (24 men from Greece and 7 men from Philippines)
