= Uncas =

Mohegan sachem of the early colonial period

Sachem Uncas
- Wôks
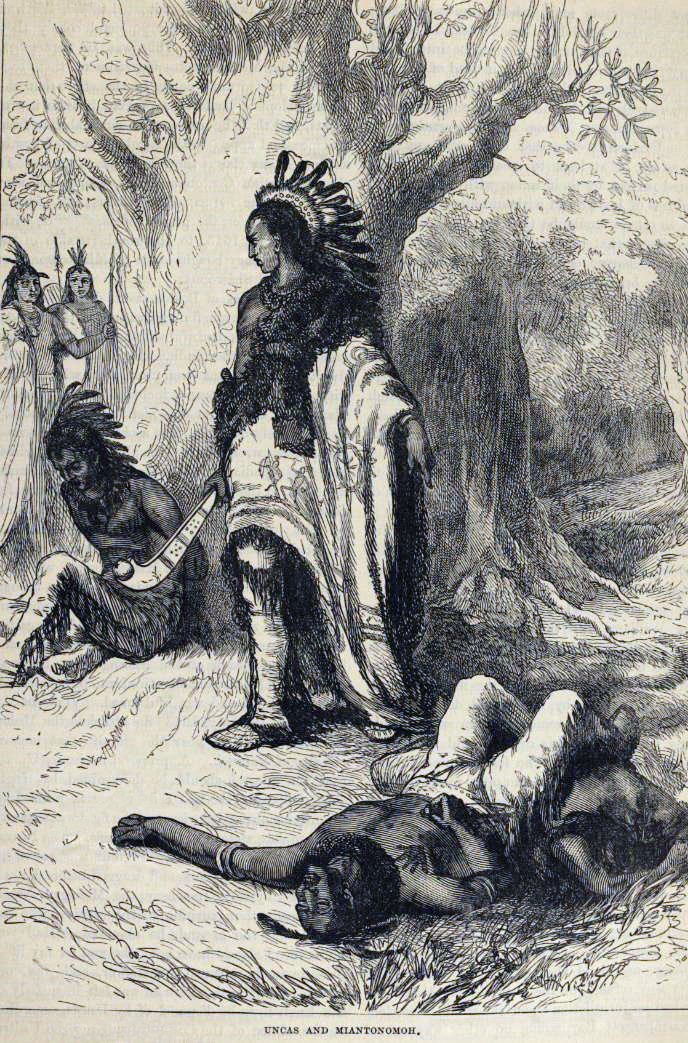
- An 1874 illustration of Uncas killing Miantonomoh in 1643

Sachem of the Mohegans

Personal details
- Born: c.1588
- Died: 1683 (aged 94–95) New London, Connecticut Colony
- Children: Oneco
- Parent: Owaneco
- Occupation: Tribal Chief, soldier
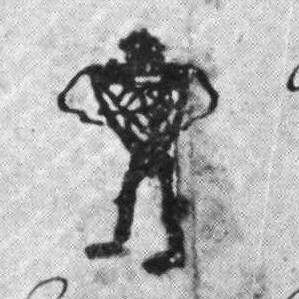
- Signature

Military service
- Allegiance: Mohegans; New England Confederation
- Rank: War Chief
- Battles/wars: War with the Narragansett; Pequot War; King Phillip's War

Uncas (Mohegan-Pequot: Wôks; c. 1588 – c. 1683) was a sachem of the Mohegans who made the Mohegans the leading regional Indian tribe in lower Connecticut, through his alliance with the New England colonists against other Indian tribes.

== Early life and family ==
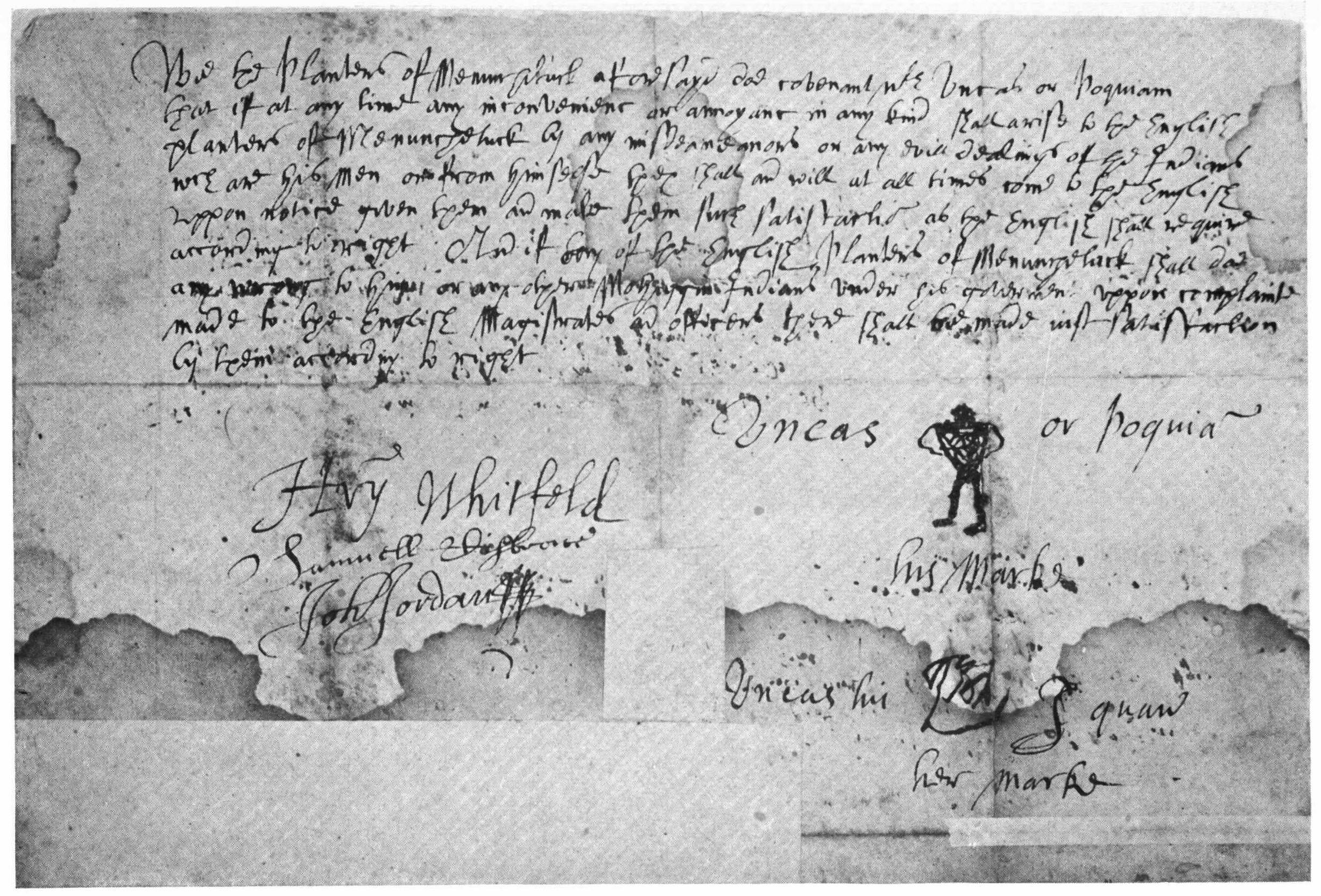
Document signed by Uncas and his wife

Uncas was born near the Thames River in present-day Connecticut, the son of the Mohegan sachem Owaneco. Uncas is a variant of the Mohegan term Wôks, meaning "Fox". He was a descendant of the principal sachems of the Mohegans, Pequots, and Narragansetts. Owaneco presided over the village known as Montonesuck. Uncas was bilingual, learning Mohegan and some English, and possibly some Dutch.

In 1626, Owaneco arranged for Uncas to marry the daughter of the principal Pequot sachem Tatobem to secure an alliance with them. Uncas had a total of seven wives, each of them high-ranking in her own right in the community. Owaneco died shortly after Uncas's first marriage, and Uncas had to submit to Tatobem's authority. Tatobem was captured and killed by the Dutch in 1633; Sassacus became his successor, but Uncas felt that he deserved to be sachem.

== Mohegan and Pequot Tribal Split ==
Owaneco's alliance with Tatobem was based upon a balance of power between the Mohegans and Pequots. After the death of Owaneco, the balance changed in favour of the Pequots. Uncas was unwilling to challenge the power of Tatobem; however, Uncas did begin contesting Pequot authority over the Mohegans. He deployed numerous hunting parties into Pequot land. In 1634 with Narragansett support, Uncas rebelled against Sassacus and Pequot authority. Uncas was defeated and became an exile among the Narragansetts. He soon returned from exile after ritually humiliating himself before Sassacus. His failed challenges resulted in Uncas having little land and few followers, but Uncas saw that the newly arriving Puritan colonists, though few in number, had better weapons and much courage, so he started to develop a new strategy and alliance to work towards his ultimate goal of Grand Sachem.

== Pequot War ==
About 1635, Uncas developed relationships with important figures in the Connecticut Colony. He was a trusted ally of Captain John Mason, a partnership which lasted three and a half decades and several family generations beyond. Uncas sent word to Jonathan Brewster that Sassacus was planning to attack the colonists on the Connecticut River. Brewster described Uncas as being "faithful" to the colonists. Uncas's "loyalty" to the colonists can perhaps also be seen in the way he spoke to powerful colonial figures such as Thomas Hooker, who he claimed planned for and wanted the war, though his claims remain unproven.

In 1637, during the Pequot War, Uncas was allied with the New England colonists and against the Pequots. He led his Mohegans in a joint attack with the colonists against the Pequots near Saybrook and again against the Pequot Fort at Mystic River. The Pequots were defeated with heavy losses and the Mohegans incorporated much of the remaining Pequot people and their land. The incorporation nearly doubled the population under Uncas's care. In the 1638 Treaty of Hartford, Uncas made the Mohegans a tributary of the Connecticut River Colony. The treaty dictated that Uncas could pursue his interests in the Pequot country only with the explicit approval of the Connecticut Colony. The Mohegans had become a regional power.

In 1640, Uncas added Sebequanash of the Hammonassets to his several wives. This marriage gave Uncas some type of control over their land which he promptly sold to New England colonists. The Hammonassets moved and became Mohegans.

== War with the Narragansett ==
The Mohegans were in continuous conflict with the Narragansetts over control of the former Pequot land. In the summer of 1643, this conflict turned into war.

The Mohegans defeated a Narragansett invasion force of around 1,000 men and captured their sachem Miantonomo. Uncas executed several of Miantonomo's fellow warriors in front of him, trying to solicit a response from Miantonomo. Consistent with the 1638 treaty, he turned Miantonomo over to the New England colonists.

The colonists put him on trial where he was found guilty. Uncas requested and was given authority to put Miantonomo to death, provided that the killing was done by Indian hands in Indian territory to prevent difficulties between the Narragansetts and the colonists. Miantonomo subsequently escaped from the Mohegan village where he was being held and jumped Yantic Falls in escape of the pursuing Mohegans. This site is also known as Indian Leap. Uncas' brother Wawequa, leading the pursuit, caught up to Miantonomo and struck him a fatal blow to the back of his head with a tomahawk. A monument stands near the site of Miantonomo's death. The exact location is unknown, since stones marking the original location of Miantonomo's grave were allegedly used by early settlers to construct a barn.

Author James Fenimore Cooper portrayed a fictional Uncas as having made the leap over the falls in his 1826 book The Last of the Mohicans.

Narragansett sachem Pessachus proposed to go to war to avenge the death of Miantonomo, but the colonists promised to support the Mohegans. Colonists from the New England Confederation formed an alliance with the Mohegans for their defense. The Narragansett attacks started in June 1644. With each success, the number of Narragansett allies grew. In 1645, Uncas and the Mohegans were under siege in Fort Shantok at Shattuck's Point and on the verge of a complete defeat when the colonists relieved them with supplies, led by Thomas Tracy and Thomas Leffingwell, and lifted the siege. The New England Confederation pledged any offensive action required to preserve Uncas in "his liberty and estate". The New England administration sent troops to defend the Mohegan fort at Shantok. When the colonists threatened to invade Narragansett territory, the Narragansett signed a peace treaty.

In 1646, the tributary tribe at Nameag, consisting of former Pequots, allied with the colonists and tried to become more independent. In response, Uncas attacked and plundered their village. The Bay Colony governor responded by threatening to allow the Narragansetts to attack the Mohegans. For the next several years, the New England colonists both asserted the Nameag's tributary status while supporting the Nameags in their independence. In 1655, the New England government removed the tribe from Uncas' authority.

== King Philip's War ==
King Philip's War started in June 1675. As tension was growing, Uncas strategically made friends with John Finch, a Christian preacher. Finch vouched on Uncas and the Mohegans behalf, promising their loyalty to the English. Uncas pledged his own son, Oneco and fifty warriors to fight with the colonists. He also gave up some of the weapons he had, as a show of good faith. In return, the Mohegans were supplied with arms from the Connecticut Council of War. Uncas saved Thomas Lathrop, an English captain, from an ambush. In the summer, the Mohegans officially entered the war on the side of the New England colonists. Uncas and his son led their forces in joint attacks with the colonists against the Wampanoags. In December, a combined New England-Mohegan force attacked a group of Narragansetts. The Mohegans continued to maintain their alliance until the war's end in July 1676.

== After death ==
Uncas died sometime between June 1683 and June 1684 in Norwich, New London County, Connecticut. Just before his passing, he created a new pledge to the Connecticut General Court which aimed to minimize violence caused by residual tension after King Phillip's War. His son, Oneco, took up leadership of the Mohegan tribe as the new sachem. He unfortunately ended up with a drinking problem who sold much of the Mohegans land. More land was sold by John Mason, whom Uncas made a trustee of the land. These sales were made with consent of Uncas's heirs. The hunting and fishing rights of the land remained with the Mohegans.

== Legacy ==
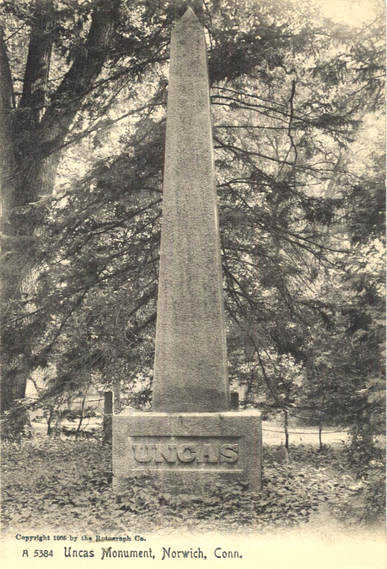
A 1905 postcard featuring a photo of the Uncas monument in Norwich, Connecticut laid by U.S. President Andrew Jackson

- President Andrew Jackson laid the foundation stone of a monument to Uncas in Norwich, Connecticut.
- Uncas Pond in Franklin, Massachusetts
- In 1907, William F. Cody laid a wreath on Uncas' monument as a commemoration to Uncas as the "Last of the Mohegans".
- James Fenimore Cooper's book The Last of the Mohicans had Chingachgook's son named Uncas.
- The two-masted wooden schooner Diosa del Mar was originally christened Uncas by the owning Vanderbilt family.
- Adolphus Busch, co-founder of Anheuser Busch, owned a summer estate in Cooperstown, New York, called the Uncas Lodge, a racehorse named Chief Uncas, as well as an ELCO ship named Chief Uncas (Boat). The Chief Uncas is still in operation today.
- Four United States Navy ships have been named USS Uncas.
- Uncasville in Eastern Connecticut is named after him.
- Uncas Lake in Nahantic State Forest, Lyme, CT is also named after the sachem.
- In the ceremonies of the Boy Scouts of America honor society the Order of the Arrow, a young man named Uncas is depicted as the son of a fictional Lenni Lenape chieftain named Chief Chingachgook, who is sent on a diplomatic mission by Chingachgook to unite the tribes of the Delaware Valley into a powerful alliance.
- In the DC Comics book Superman #276 in June 1974, Captain Thunder's attribute is labeled as "the bravery of Uncas."

== See also ==
- Oneco
- John Mason (colonist)
