= Granny Squannit =

Mythological figure in Wampanoag folklore

Granny Squannit (or Squant) is a mythological figure from Wampanoag and Mohegan folklore. She is the wife of the giant Maushop and can be either a small woodland or sea creature. Though Maushup is usually portrayed as a giant, Squannit is considered one of the Little People (makiawisug). Stories about Squannit vary widely from community to community, but she usually has magical powers and is often associated with the sea and with storms.

== Mythology ==
According to legend, Granny Squannit is one of the Makiawisug, and healers would often look to her for help or guidance. She is a powerful sorceress and arguments with her husband are said to cause storms.
