= Mohegan =

Algonquian tribe native to the northeastern US

mohiksak (Mohegan-Pequot)
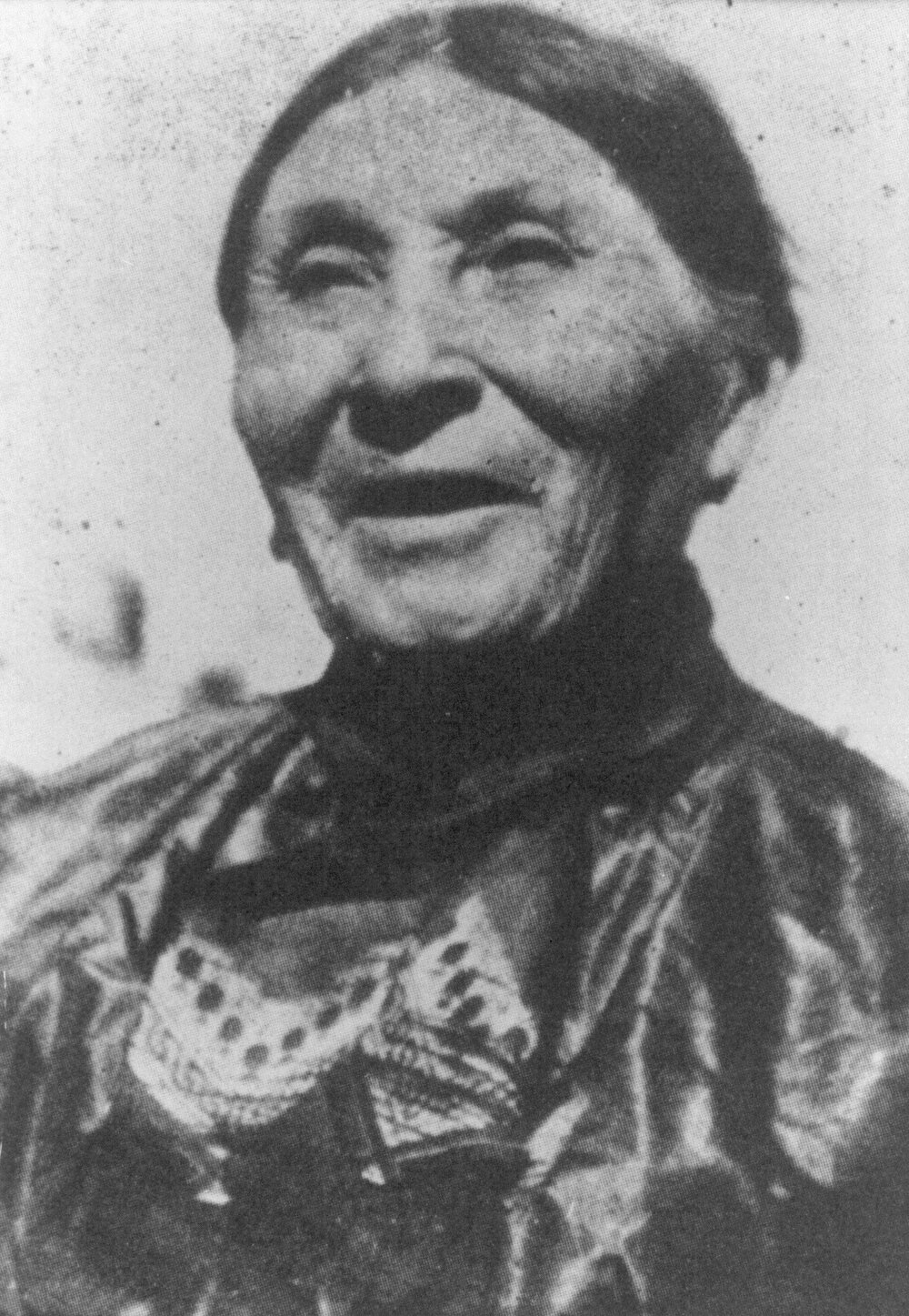
- Fidelia Fielding (Cits Pátunáhshô), last fluent speaker of the Mohegan-Pequot language

Total population
- 2,500 (2026 estimate)

Regions with significant populations
- Mohegan Indian Reservation, Connecticut, United States

Languages
- English, originally Mohegan-Pequot language

Religion
- Mohegan spirituality, Christianity

Related ethnic groups
- Pequot people

The Mohegan (/ˈmoʊhiːɡæn/, Mohegan-Pequot: mohiksak) are an Algonquian Native American people based in present-day Connecticut.They are part of the Eastern Algonquian linguistic and cultural family and historically shared close ties with the neighboring Pequot, from whom they separated in the early 17th century. The Mohegan are primarily enrolled in the Mohegan Tribe, a federally recognized tribe living on a reservation in the eastern upper Thames River valley of south-central Connecticut.

At the time of European contact, the Mohegan and Pequot were a unified tribal entity living in the southeastern Connecticut region, but the Mohegan gradually became independent as the hegemonic Pequot lost control over their trading empire and tributary groups. Over time, the Mohegan gradually lost ownership of much of their tribal lands. In 1978, Chief Rolling Cloud Hamilton petitioned for federal recognition of the Mohegan. Descendants of his Mohegan band operate independently of the federally recognized nation.

In 1994, a majority group of Mohegan gained federal recognition as the Mohegan Tribe of Indians of Connecticut (MTIC). They have been defined by the United States government as the "successor in interest to the aboriginal entity known as the Mohegan Indian Tribe." The United States took land into trust the same year, under an act of Congress to serve as a reservation for the tribe.

Most of the Mohegan people in Connecticut today live on the Mohegan Reservation near Uncasville in the Town of Montville, New London County. The MTIC operate the Mohegan Sun Casino on their reservation in Uncasville and the Mohegan Pennsylvania racetrack and casino near Wilkes-Barre, Pennsylvania.

== Etymology ==
The word Mohegan (Mohegan-Pequot: mohiksak, also historically moyahikaniwak) translates as "People of the Wolf".

Although similar in name, the Mohegan are a different tribe from the Mohican/Mahican (Mahican: Muhhekunneuw, transl. "people of the waters that are never still"), a fellow Eastern Algonquian tribe from the Hudson River Valley. The Dutch colonist Adriaen Block, one of the first Europeans to record the names of both tribes, clearly distinguished between the "Morhicans" (now the Mohegans) and the "Mahicans, Mahikanders, Mohicans, [or] Maikens". Nonetheless, in the United States, both tribes have been referred to in various historic documents by the spelling "Mohican", based on mistakes in translation and location. For example, the Mohegan minister and educator Samson Occom, despite being widely recognized as Mohegan, was referred to as a "Mohican" in early records at Dartmouth College.

== History ==
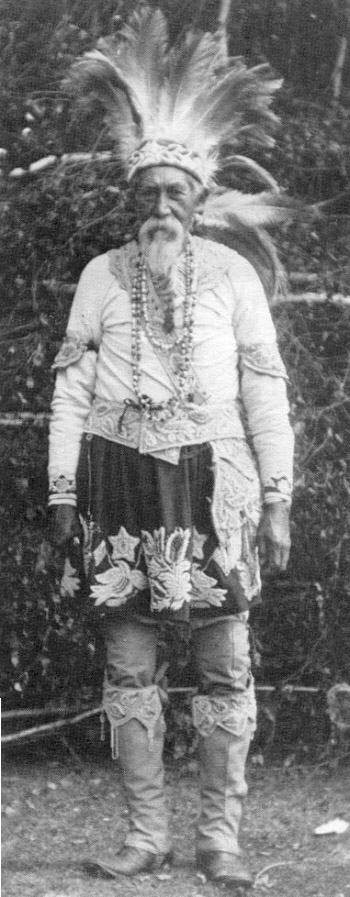
Lester Skeesuk, a Narraganset-Mohegan, in traditional regalia

The Mohegan people were historically based in central southern Connecticut, originally forming part of the Pequot people. Prior to European contact, both groups are believed to have been part of a larger coastal Algonquian-speaking population that migrated southward from the upper Hudson River Valley and other inland regions. The term "Pequot" was often used in early colonial records as a broad reference to multiple groups in southeastern Connecticut, including the Mohegan. However, internal kinship structures, clan systems, and oral histories preserve the understanding that the Mohegan and Pequot maintained separate leadership traditions and ceremonial practices even before formal political divisions took place.

The separation of the Mohegan from the Pequot occurred in the early 17th century. According to oral tradition and colonial-era records, a Mohegan leader named Uncas broke from the leadership of Pequot sachem Sassacus and established an independent community along the Thames River in present-day Connecticut. Following a council at Cochegan Rock, Uncas is said to have "broken the arrows of peace" with Sassacus, symbolizing the end of their political unity. Following their separation from the Pequot, the Mohegan established permanent settlements along the Thames, most notably at Shantok, and aligned with the English settlers against the Pequot.

In 1637, English Puritan colonists destroyed a Pequot fortified village at Mistick with the help of the Mohegan sachem Uncas, the Christian convert and sagamore Wequash Cooke, and the Narragansetts during the Pequot War. This ended with the death of Uncas' cousin Sassacus near Albany, New York, where he had fled, at the hands of the Mohawk, a Haudenosaunee nation from west of the Hudson River. Thereafter, the Mohegan became a separate tribal nation under the leadership of Uncas.

In 1933, John E. Hamilton (Chief Rolling Cloud) was appointed as a Grand Sachem by his mother Alice Storey through a traditional selection process based on heredity. She was a direct descendant of Uncas and of Tamaquashad, Sachem of the Pequot tribe. In Mohegan tradition, the position of tribal leadership was often hereditary through the maternal line.

=== Land claims and federal recognition ===
In the 1960s, during a period of rising activism among Native Americans, John Hamilton filed a number of land claims authorized by the "Council of Descendants of Mohegan Indians." The group had some 300 members at the time. In 1970 the Montville band of Mohegans expressed its dissatisfaction with land-claims litigation. When the Hamilton supporters left the meeting, this band elected Courtland Fowler as their new leader. Notes of that Council meeting referred to Hamilton as Sachem.

The group led by John Hamilton (although opposed by the Fowlers) worked with the attorney Jerome Griner in federal land claims through the 1970s. During this time, a Kent, Connecticut, property owners' organization, with some Native and non-Native members, worked to oppose the Hamilton land claims and the recognition petition for federal recognition, out of fear that tribal nations would take private properties.

In 1978, in response to the desires of tribal nations across the country to gain federal recognition and recover tribal sovereignty, the Bureau of Indian Affairs (BIA) established a formal administrative process. The process included specific criteria that BIA officials would judge as evidence of cultural continuity. In that same year, Hamilton's band submitted a petition for federal recognition for the Mohegan tribe.

The petition process stalled when John Hamilton died in 1988. The petition for federal recognition was revived in 1989, but the BIA's preliminary finding was that the Mohegan had not satisfied the criteria of documenting continuity in social community, and political authority and influence as a tribe through the twentieth century.

In 1990, the Mohegan band led by Chief Courtland Fowler submitted a detailed response to meet the BIA's concerns. The tribe included compiled genealogies and other records, including records pertaining to the Mohegan Congregational Church in Montville. BIA researchers used records provided by the Hamilton band, records from the Mohegan Church, and records maintained by Gladys Tantaquidgeon, who had kept genealogy and vital statistics of tribal members for her anthropological research.

In 1990, the Fowler group, identifying as the Mohegan Tribe of Indians of Connecticut (MTIC), decided that the tribe's membership would be restricted to documented descendants from a single family group, ca. 1860. This criterion excludes some of the Hamilton followers. By law, a Federally recognized tribe has the authority to determine its own rules for membership. The MTIC unsuccessfully attempted to stop other Mohegan people from using "Mohegan" as their tribal identity, in public records and in craftwork.

In its 1994 "Final Determination", the BIA cited the vital statistics and genealogies as documents that were decisive in demonstrating "that the tribe did indeed have social and political continuity during the middle of the 20th century." As a result, the Mohegan Tribe of Indians of Connecticut (MTIC) gained recognition as a sovereign tribal nation.

That same year, Congress passed the Mohegan Nation (Connecticut) Land Claim Settlement Act, which authorized the United States to take land into trust to establish a reservation for the Mohegan and settle their land claim. The final 1994 agreement between MTIC and the State in the settlement of land claims extinguished all pending land claims. The MTIC adopted a written constitution. MTIC is governed by a chief, an elected chairman and an elected tribal council, all of whom serve for specific terms.

The Mohegan people associated with Sachem John Hamilton persist as an independent group today. In his will, Hamilton named his non-Mohegan wife, Eleanor Fortin as Sachem. She is now the leader of the "Hamilton group." Despite their contentious histories and disagreements, both groups continued to participate in tribal activities and to identify as members of the Mohegan people. The Hamilton band of Mohegans continues to function and govern themselves independently of the MTIC, holding periodic gatherings and activities in their traditional territory of south-central Connecticut.

== Geography ==
The Mohegan homelands in Connecticut include landmarks such as Trading Cove on the Thames River, Cochegan Rock, Fort Shantok, and Mohegan Hill, where the Mohegan founded a Congregational Church in the early 1800s. In 1931, the Tantaquidgeon family built the Tantaquidgeon Museum on Mohegan Hill to house tribal artifacts and histories. Gladys Tantaquidgeon (1899–2005) served for years as the Tribe's medicine woman and unofficial historian. She studied anthropology at the University of Pennsylvania and worked for a decade with the Bureau of Indian Affairs. Returning to Connecticut, she operated this museum for six decades. It was one of the first museums to be owned and operated by American Indians.

== Culture ==
=== Language ===
The Mohegan language is part of the Mohegan-Pequot branch of the Eastern Algonquian languages, which include the traditional languages of many Indigenous peoples along the Atlantic coast from Canada to North Carolina.

One of the earliest known literate Mohegan figures was Samson Occom (1723–1792), a minister, scholar, and public intellectual. Occom was fluent in Mohegan and is believed to have used the language in preaching and teaching, though his surviving writings are in English. In 2022, Dartmouth College formally repatriated Occom’s personal papers, known as the Occom Papers, to the Mohegan Tribe.

The last living native speaker of Mohegan, Fidelia "Flying Bird" A. Hoscott Fielding, died in 1908. The Mohegan language was recorded primarily in her diaries, and in articles and a Smithsonian Institution report made by the early anthropologist, Frank Speck. Her niece, Gladys Tantaquidgeon, worked to preserve the language. Since 2012, the Mohegan Tribe has established a project to revive its language and establish new generations of native speakers.

=== Spirituality ===
Traditional Mohegan spirituality is centered on a relationship of balance and reciprocity with the natural world. The Creator, often referred to in English as Mundo, is understood not as a distant figure but as an ever-present force in the cycles of nature, community, and thought. All living beings are considered related, and animals, plants, and geographic features are treated with respect as part of a shared cosmology. Mohegan people often speak of ancestors as present and active in daily life, offering guidance through dreams, intuition, and memory.

==== Trail of Life ====
A foundational concept in Mohegan spirituality is the "Trail of Life", a symbolic rolling path that represents the course of human life. This trail is understood to extend thirteen generations backward and thirteen generations forward, placing each individual within a larger continuum of responsibility and memory. Choices made in the present are expected to honor the sacrifices of ancestors and protect the well-being of those yet to be born.

==== Mythical creatures ====
The Mohegan believe in the existence of the Makiawisug or little people. Associated with the whip-poor-will and wearing lady's slippers for shoes, these nocturnal spirits are said to have taught the Mohegan to grow corn and use healing plants. Small baskets of food are left by the Mohegan as offerings for the Makiawisug. Their leader is Granny Squannit, who is married to Moshup the giant.

==== Wigwam Festival ====
Prior to European colonization, the Mohegan held a number of traditional ceremonies along an annual calendar, but today only the Wigwam (Green Corn) Festival is generally practiced. The Wigwam Festival is a celebration of harvest, renewal, and thanksgiving which was revived in the 1860s by Mohegan medicine woman Emma Fielding Baker. The ceremony is held at Fort Shantok at the end of summer., and includes the building of a brush arbor and a feast with traditional foods.

=== Lifeways ===
Mohegan settlements were primarily composed of wigwams and followed seasonal cycles, with families moving between river valleys, coastal areas, and inland forests depending on the time of year and availability of resources. Women were traditionally responsible for agriculture, cultivating the "Three Sisters” of corn, beans, and squash, while men hunted and fished. Traditional foods include yokeag, a parched and pounded raw cornmeal, as well as suqatash (succotash), clam chowder, and oyster stew.

=== Ethnobotany ===
The Mohegan people have always had extensive knowledge of local flora and fauna, of hunting and fishing technologies, of seasonal adaptations, and of herbal medicine, as practices passed down through the generations. Gladys Tantaquidgeon was instrumental in recording herbal medicinal knowledge and folklore, and in comparing these plants and practices to those of other Algonquian peoples like the Lenni Lenape (Delaware) and Wampanoag. Tantaquidgeon recorded that an infusion of bark removed from the south side of the silver maple tree is used by the Mohegan for cough medicine. The Mohegan also use the inner bark of the sugar maple as a cough remedy, and the sap as a sweetening agent and to make maple syrup.

== Notable Mohegans ==
- Emma Fielding Baker (1828–1916), revivalist of the Green Corn Ceremony and Tribal Chairperson
- Faith Davison (1940–2019), researcher, consultant
- Samson Occom (1723–1792), Presbyterian minister, who helped relocate the Brothertown Indians to New York state.
- Fidelia Hoscott Fielding (Cits Pátunáhshô; 1827–1908), last native speaker of the Mohegan-Pequot language.
- Stephanie Fielding, linguist
- John E. Hamilton (1897–1988), Grand Sachem Chief Rolling Cloud, Indian rights activist
- Lynn Malerba (Mutáwi Mutáhash; b. 1953), tribal chief and United States Treasurer (2022–2024)
- Oneco, son of Uncas
- Madeline Sayet (b. 1989), writer, director, actress.
- Gladys Tantaquidgeon (1899–2005), anthropologist, herbalist, co-founder of the Tantaquidgeon Museum. Worked to preserve Mohegan culture through the 20th century.
- Melissa Tantaquidgeon Zobel (b. 1960) (née Melissa Jane Fawcett), Mohegan Tribal Historian and author of several books on Mohegan culture, including Medicine Trail: The Life and Lessons of Gladys Tantaquidgeon (2000)
- Uncas (Wôks; c. 1588 – c. 1683), famed sachem of the Mohegan
- Mahomet Weyonomon (c. 1700–1736), sachem who traveled to England in 1735 to seek better treatment of his people.

== In literature ==
Lydia Sigourney published her poem "The Rival Kings of Mohegan, contrasted with the Rival Brothers of Persia" in her 1827 collection of poetry. In that same collection are two other poems relating to the Mohegan nation, "The Chair of the Indian King" and "Burial of Mazeen". The first she describes as a rough, rocky recess in the region of Mohegan and known as "the chair of Uncas"; Mazeen she calls the last of the royal line of the Mohegan nation.

== See also ==
- Mohegan Indian Tribe
- Brothertown Indians
- Pequot people
- Mohegan Sun
