= Pequot =

Indigenous people from Connecticut, US

Pequots
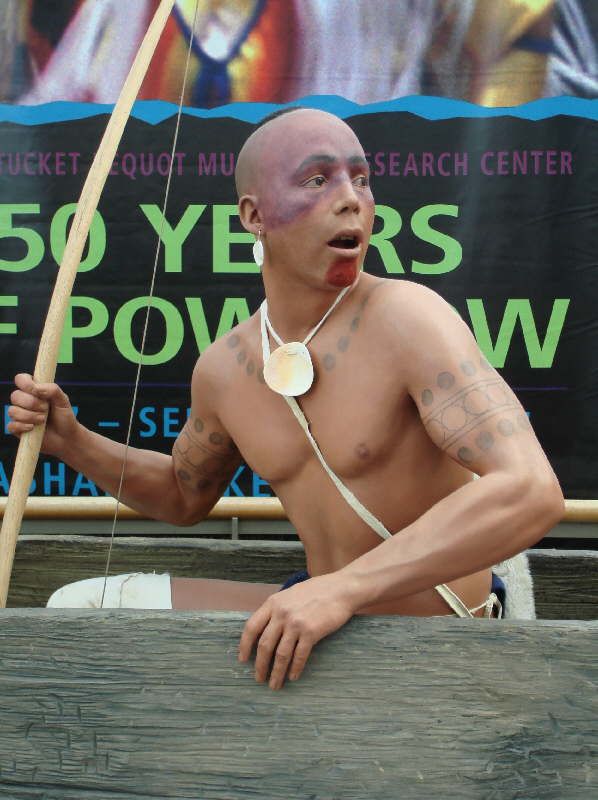
- Mashantucket Pequot Museum exhibit showing Mashantucket warrior

Total population
- 1620: 16,000 (est.) 1637: 3,000 (est.); 1910: 66; 1972: 21 2000: 1,000–2,000 (est.)

Regions with significant populations
- Eastern Pequot Tribal Nation, Lantern Hill, North Stonington, Connecticut: 1,130; Mashantucket Pequot Tribe or Western Pequot, Ledyard, Connecticut: 350

Languages
- Historically Pequot, a dialect of the Mohegan-Pequot language (an Algonquian language), now English

Religion
- Native American religion, Christianity

Related ethnic groups
- Mohegan

The Pequot (/ˈpiːkwɒt/ PEE-kwot) are a Native American people of Connecticut. The modern Pequot are members of the federally recognized Mashantucket Pequot Tribe, four other state-recognized groups in Connecticut including the Eastern Pequot Tribal Nation, or the Brothertown Indians of Wisconsin. They historically spoke Pequot, a dialect of the Mohegan-Pequot language, which became extinct by the early 20th century. Some tribal members are undertaking revival efforts.

The Pequot and the Mohegan were formerly a single group, but the Mohegan split off in the 17th century as the Pequot came to control much of Connecticut. Simmering tensions with the New England Colonies led to the Pequot War of 1634–1638, which some historians consider to be a genocide under modern day terms, which dramatically reduced the population and influence of the Pequot; many members were killed, enslaved, or dispersed. The Treaty of Hartford of 1638 sought to eradicate the Pequot cultural identity by prohibiting the Pequots from returning to their lands, speaking their tribal language, or referring to themselves as Pequots.

Small numbers of Pequots remain in Connecticut, receiving reservations at Mashantucket in 1666 and at the Pawcatuck River in 1683; others lived in different areas and with other tribes. In the 18th century, some Christian Pequot joined members of several other groups to form the Brothertown Indians in western New Hampshire. They relocated to Western New York in the 19th century, where they were allowed land by the Oneida people of the Iroquois League, and later to Wisconsin, where they were granted a reservation.

The Mashantucket Pequot Tribe received federal recognition in 1983 through a settlement of a land claim. In 1986, they founded the Foxwoods Resort Casino on their land. Located in proximity to the New York City metropolitan area, it has become one of the country's most successful Native American casinos.

The Pawcatuck River Pequot formed the Eastern Pequot Tribal Nation, which is recognized by Connecticut but is not federally recognized. Additionally, Pequot descendants are enrolled in the federally recognized Mohegan Tribe, as well as the Schaghticoke Tribal Nation and Golden Hill Paugussett Indian Nation of Connecticut, and the Brothertown Indians of Wisconsin, which also have degrees of state recognition. The Poospatuck Reservation on Long Island is home to a few hundred self-identified Pequot descendants.

== History ==
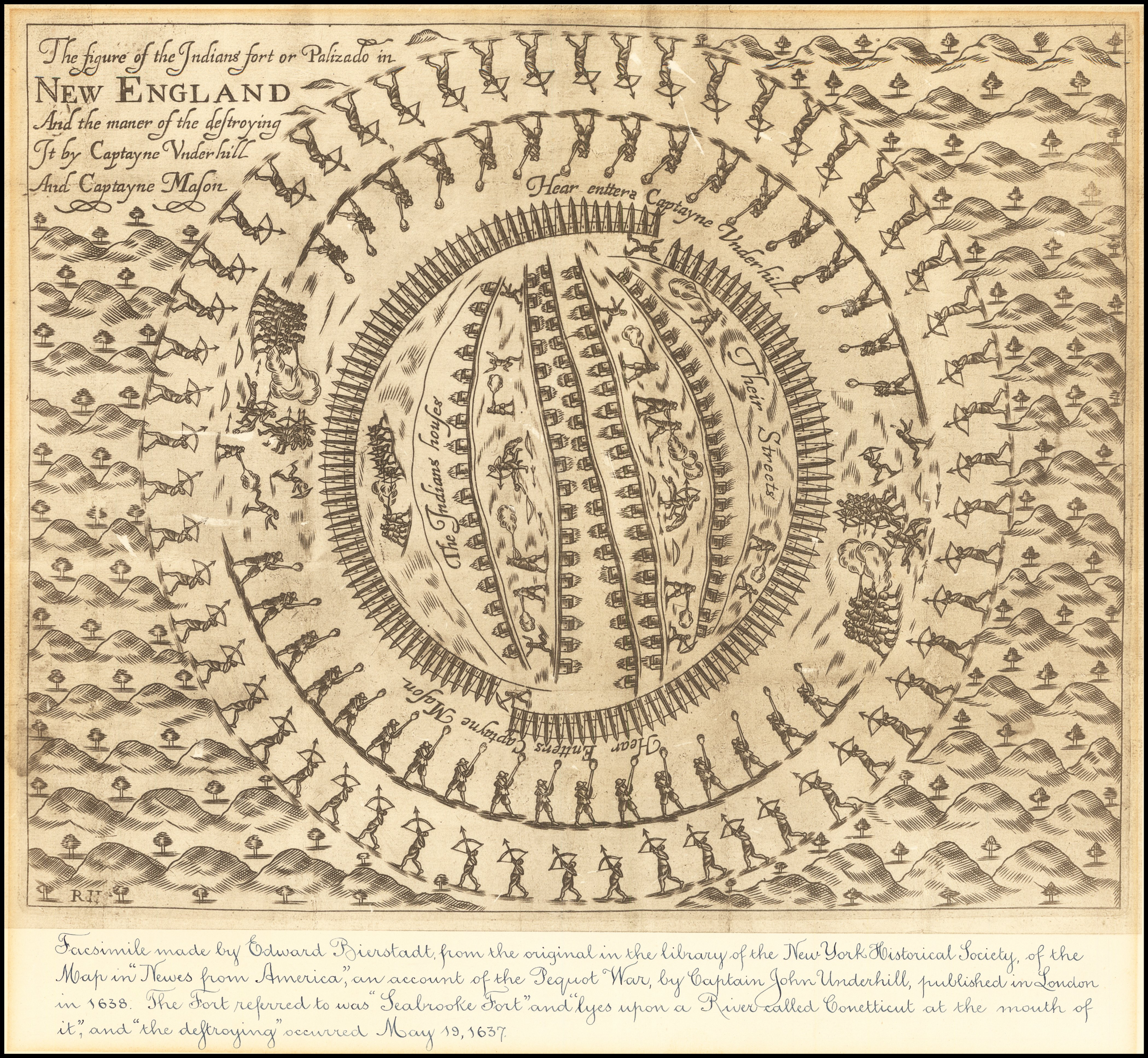
Depiction of the Mystic Massacre, by Massachusetts Bay colonists in 1637

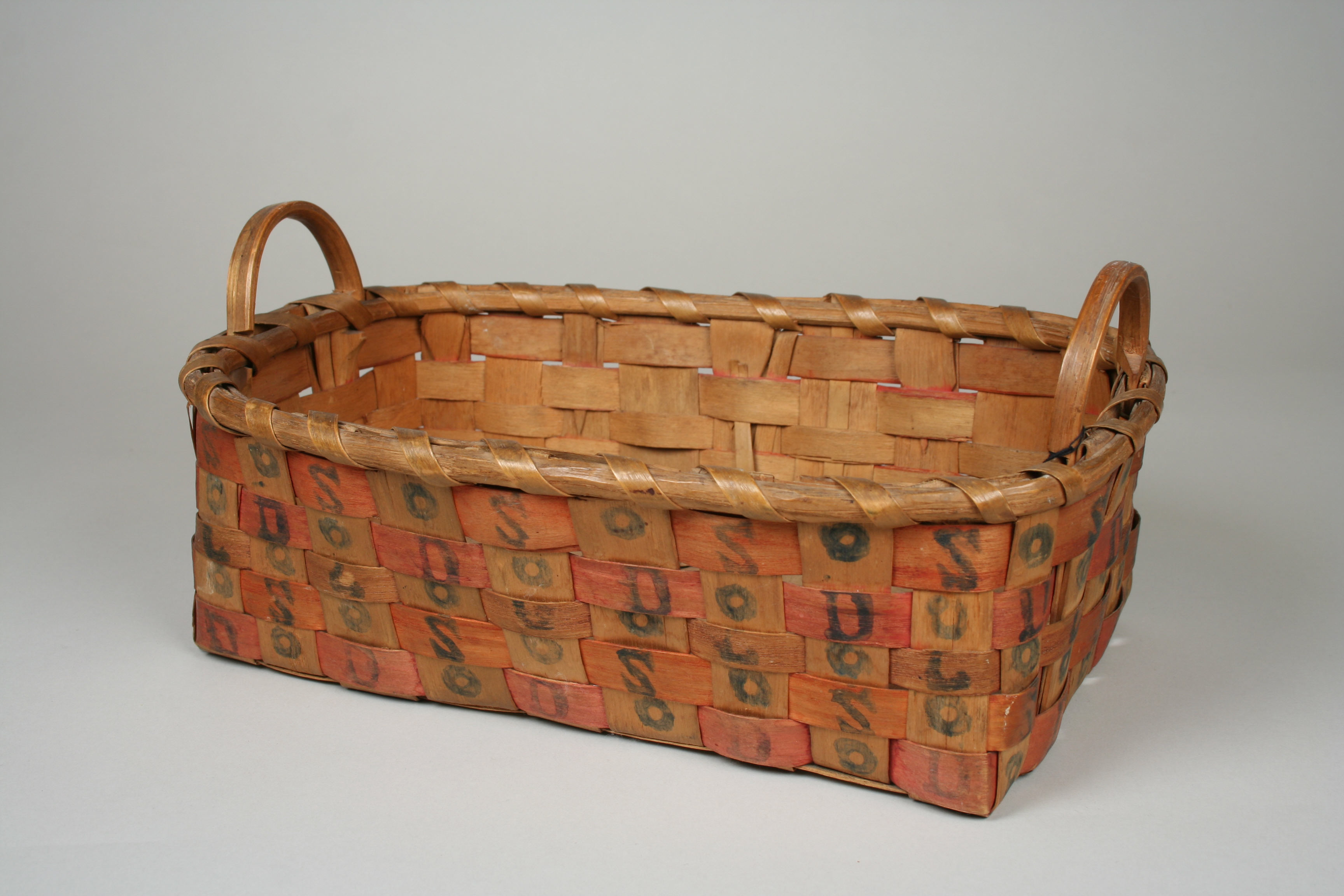
Pequot basket, c. 1840–60

=== Etymology ===
Pequot is an Algonquian word, the meaning of which is disputed among language specialists. Considerable scholarship on the Pequot claims that the name came from Pequttôog, meaning ‘the destroyers’ or ‘the men of the swamp’. Frank Speck was a leading specialist of the Mohegan-Pequot language in the early twentieth century, and he believed that another term was more plausible, meaning ‘the shallowness of a body of water’, given that the Pequot territory was along the coast of Long Island Sound.

Historians have debated whether the Pequot migrated about 1500 from the upper Hudson River Valley toward central and eastern Connecticut. The theory of Pequot migration to the Connecticut River Valley can be traced to Rev. William Hubbard, who claimed in 1677 that the Pequot had invaded the region some time before the establishment of Plymouth Colony rather than originating in the region. In the aftermath of King Philip's War, Hubbard detailed in his Narrative of the Troubles with the Indians in New-England the ferocity with which some of New England's tribes responded to the English. Hubbard described the Pequot as "foreigners" to the region; not invaders from another shore but "from the interior of the continent" who "by force seized upon one of the goodliest places near the sea, and became a Terror to all their Neighbors."

Much of the archaeological, linguistic and documentary evidence now available demonstrates that the Pequot were not invaders to the Connecticut River Valley but were indigenous in that area for thousands of years. By the time of the founding of Plymouth and Massachusetts Bay colonies, the Pequot had already attained a position of political, military, and economic dominance in central and eastern Connecticut. They occupied the coastal area between the Niantic tribe of the Niantic River of Connecticut and the Narragansett in western Rhode Island. The Pequot numbered some 16,000 persons in the most densely inhabited portion of southern New England.

The smallpox epidemic of 1616–1619 killed many of the Native Americans of the eastern coast of New England, but it did not reach the Pequot, Niantic nor Narragansett tribes. In 1633 the Dutch established a trading post called the House of Good Hope at Hartford. They executed the principal Pequot sachem, Tatobem, because of a violation of an agreement. After the Pequot paid the Dutch a large ransom, they returned Tatobem's body to his people. His successor was Sassacus.

In 1633, an epidemic devastated all of the region's tribes, and historians estimate that the Pequot suffered the loss of 80 percent of their population. At the outbreak of the Pequot War, Pequot survivors may have numbered only about 3,000.

=== Pequot War ===
Members of the Pequot tribe killed a resident of Connecticut Colony in 1636, John Oldham, and war erupted as a result. The Mohegan and the Narragansett tribes sided with the colonists. Around 1,500 Pequot warriors were killed in battles or hunted down, and others were captured and distributed as slaves or household servants. A few escaped to join the Mohawk, and the Niantic tribe on Long Island. Eventually, some returned to their traditional lands, where family groups of friendly Pequots had stayed. Of those enslaved, most were awarded to the allied tribes, but many were also sold as slaves in Bermuda. The Mohegans treated their Pequot captives so severely that officials of Connecticut Colony eventually removed them. Connecticut established two reservations for the Pequots in 1683: the Eastern Pequot Reservation in North Stonington, Connecticut, and the Western Pequots (or Mashantucket Pequot Reservation) in Ledyard.

=== 19th century ===
The Shawnee chief Tecumseh cited the destruction of the Pequot in call to arms against the United States during the War of 1812. It was commonly thought that they had disappeared entirely due to violence against Native Americans provoked by American colonists, although this was not true.

=== Modern history ===
The 1910 census numbered the Pequot population at 66, and they reached their lowest number several decades later. Pequot numbers grew significantly during the 1970s and 1980s, especially the Mashantucket Pequot tribe which opened a casino in the same timeframe, and tribal chairman Richard A. Hayward encouraged them to return to their tribal homeland. He worked for Federal recognition and economic development.

In 1976, the Pequots filed suit with the assistance of the Native American Rights Fund (NARF) and the Indian Rights Association against landowners and residents of North Stonington to get their land, which the Pequots claimed had been illegally sold in 1856 by the State of Connecticut, and they settled after seven years. The Connecticut Legislature passed legislation to petition the federal government to grant tribal recognition to the Mashantucket Pequots, and the "Mashantucket Pequot Indian Land Claims Settlement Act" was enacted by Congress and signed by President Ronald Reagan on October 18, 1983. This settlement granted federal recognition to the Mashantucket Pequot tribe, enabling them to buy the land covered in the Settlement Act and place it in trust with the Bureau of Indian Affairs (BIA) for reservation use. In 1986, they opened a bingo operation, followed by the first phase of Foxwoods Resort Casino in 1992. Revenue from the casino has enabled the development and construction of a cultural museum which opened on August 11, 1998, on the Mashantucket Pequot Reservation where many members of the tribe continue to live.

The Eastern Pequot Tribal Nation was recognized in 2002. Since the 1930s, both Pequot tribes had serious tension over racial issues, with some people claiming that darker-skinned descendants should not be considered fully Pequot. Two groups of Eastern Pequots filed petitions for recognition with the BIA, and they agreed to unite to achieve recognition. The state immediately challenged the decision, and the Department of the Interior revoked their recognition in 2005. That same year, it revoked recognition for the Schaghticoke tribe who had gained recognition in 2004. The Connecticut state government and Congressional delegation opposed the BIA's recognition because residents were worried that the newly recognized tribes would establish gaming casinos.

== Geography ==
The 1,130-member Eastern Pequot Tribal Nation has a reservation called "Lantern Hill." The Eastern Pequot Tribal Nation is recognized by the state of Connecticut.

The 800+ Mashantucket Pequot or Western Pequot gained federal recognition in 1983 and have a reservation in Ledyard.

The Poospatuck Reservation on Long Island is also home to a few hundred self-identified Pequot descendants.

Nearly all individuals who are identified as Pequot live in the two above-named communities.

== Language ==
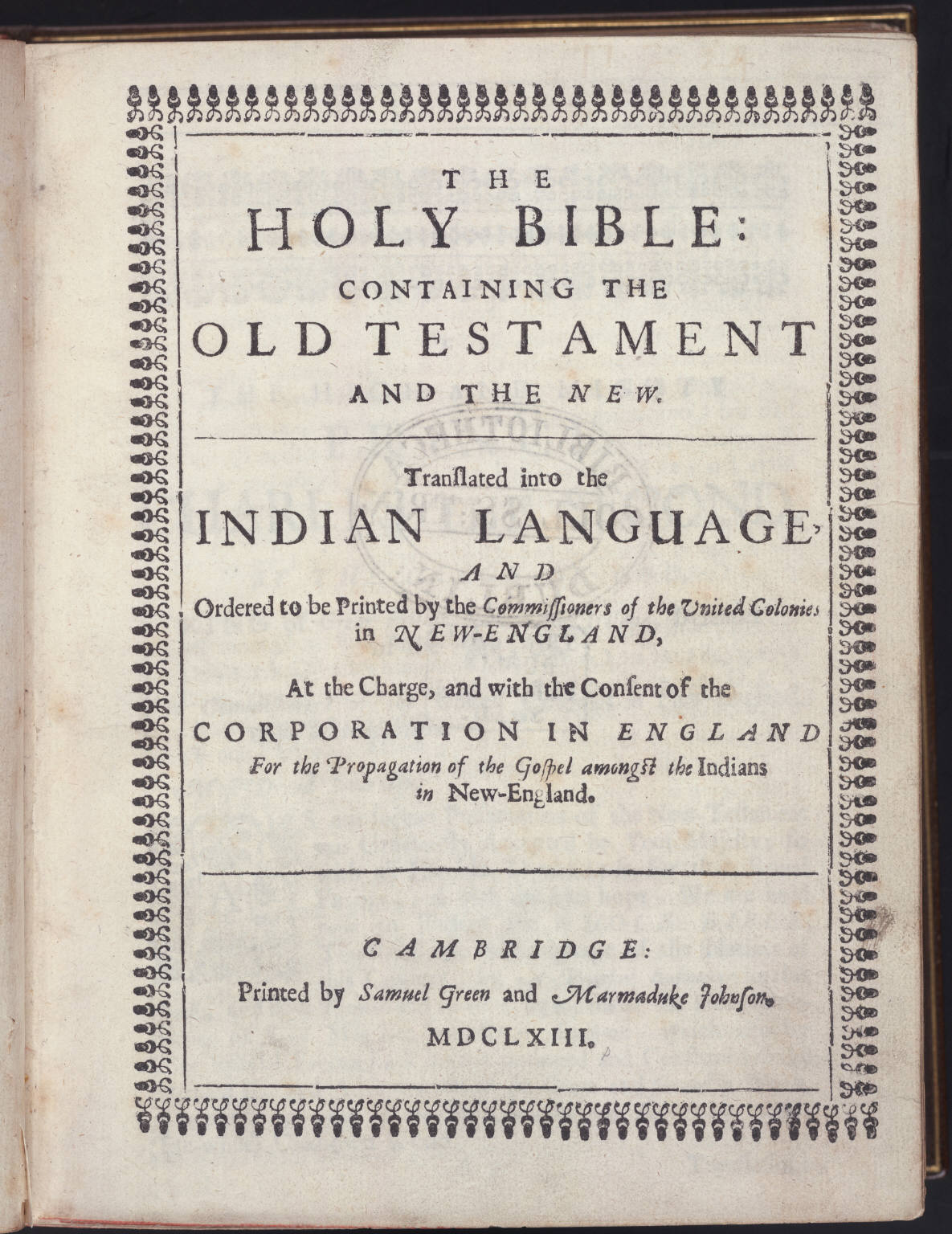
Cover of 1663 Bible translated into the Wampanoag language

Historically, the Pequots spoke a dialect of the Mohegan-Pequot language, an Eastern Algonquian language. The Treaty of Hartford concluded the Pequot War in 1637, when the colonists made speaking the language a capital offense. Within a generation or so, it became largely extinct. Pequot from both the Eastern Pequot Tribal Nation and the Mashantucket Pequot now speak English as their first language.

In the 21st century, the Mashantucket Pequot are undertaking aggressive efforts to revive the language. They are conducting careful analysis of historical documents containing Pequot words and comparing them to extant closely related languages. So far, they have reclaimed more than 1,000 words, though that is a small fraction of what would be necessary for a functional language. The Mashantucket Pequots have begun offering language classes with the help of the Mashpee Wampanoag. The Wampanoag recently initiated the Wôpanâak Language Reclamation Project. The southern New England Indian communities participating in the Wôpanâak Language Reclamation Project are Mashpee Wampanoag, Aquinnah Wampanoag, Herring Pond Wampanoag, and Mashantucket Pequot.

== Notable Pequot ==
- William Apess (1798–1839) was an ordained Methodist minister, writer, and temperance activist of Pequot and European descent; he was a political and religious leader in Massachusetts.
- Willy DeVille (1950–2009), rock and roll guitarist, songwriter and singer, was Pequot through his mother and maternal grandmother's lineage. He explored his Pequot roots in his post-2000 works.

== See also ==
- Podunk people

== Notes ==
- The Pequod, the fictional 19th-century Nantucket whaling ship featured in Herman Melville's novel Moby-Dick (1851), is named after the Pequot tribe.
- The town of Pequot Lakes, Minnesota is believed to have been named after the tribe.
