= Red Thunder Cloud =

American imposter (1919–1996)

- Born: Cromwell Ashbie Hawkins West; May 30, 1919; Newport, Rhode Island, U.S.
- Died: January 8, 1996 (aged 76); Worcester, Massachusetts, U.S.
- Other names: Carlos Westez; Tez
- Occupations: Singer, dancer, storyteller, and field researcher
- Relatives: William Ashbie Hawkins (grandfather)

Red Thunder Cloud (May 30, 1919 – January 8, 1996), born Cromwell Ashbie Hawkins West, also known as Carlos Westez, was an American singer, dancer, storyteller, and field researcher. For a time he was promoted by anthropologists as "the last fluent speaker of the Catawba language" but he was later revealed to have learned what little he knew of the language from books. The grandson of a prominent African-American attorney and community leader, Red Thunder Cloud was an African American who reinvented himself as a Native American.

Anthropologist Frank Speck said he believed Red Thunder Cloud to be a genuine Catawba Indian and proceeded to provide him with training in field methods of recording notes for ethnological studies. Speck insisted Thunder Cloud spoke the Catawba language, though Catawba leadership said he only knew "a few words," that he had learned from Speck's books. After "Thunder Cloud" died, and was revealed to be Cromwell Ashbie Hawkins West, public confirmation came of what the Catawba leaders had already known: "Red Thunder Cloud" was neither Catawba nor Native American, and had never had any contact with the Catawba people until Speck introduced them.

Despite doubts and skepticism about West from the communities he studied, West continued to represent himself as an expert on multiple Native cultures and languages. He continued to work for Speck, collecting ethnographic data and folklore from various Native American cultures, and collaborated with several other anthropologists to write about Native American cultures and languages with which he had also had no contact.

== Early life ==
Red Thunder Cloud was born on May 30, 1919, as Cromwell Ashbie Hawkins West in Newport, Rhode Island, to Cromwell Payne West of Pennsylvania and Roberta Hawkins West of Lynchburg, Virginia. Both were of African American descent. His maternal grandfather was William Ashbie Hawkins, one of the first African-American lawyers in Baltimore. From 1935 to 1937 West was employed by the Newport City wharf as a watchman and later as a chauffeur.

In 1938, 19 year old West wrote a letter to Frank G. Speck, a professor of anthropology at the University of Pennsylvania, claiming that he was a 16 year old Catawba Indian. He asked Speck for help in learning more about his people and told him that he had been interested in Native American culture since the fourth grade. He claimed that he was raised by the Narragansett tribe of Rhode Island and had lived with the Shinnecock tribe since 1937. In this letter he claimed that he learned the Catawba language from his grandmother, Ada McMechen. However, he also mentions Gatschet's extensive, published work on the Catawba language, which is a far more likely source for his knowledge, as are the works of James Smith. The 19 year old West then proceeded to sign this letter with the name, "Chief Red Thunder Cloud".

== Red Thunder Cloud identity ==
West reinvented his identity at this point and lived the rest of his life as Red Thunder Cloud of the Catawba tribe. Frank Speck believed West to be a genuine Catawba Indian and employed him on small projects, collecting ethnographic data and folklore among Long Island Indians. He also collected data on the Montauk, Shinnecock, and Mashpee tribes for George Gustav Heye, founder of what became the National Museum of the American Indian.

In December 1943, West lived at the University of Pennsylvania for two weeks, providing what he convinced them was information on the Catawba tribe, recording music, and aiding in ethnobotanical research, despite not being Catawba himself, and having never visited a Catawba community.

West only visited the Catawba Reservation in Rock Hill, South Carolina, for the first time in February 1944. He arrived with a letter of introduction from Speck. While Speck insisted that West "spoke Catawba", he seems to have been alone in this claim; Chief Sam Blue, a native speaker of the Catawba language, said West only knew "a few words of Catawba" and that this small bit all seems to have come from Speck's books.

According to Chief Gilbert Blue of the Catawba Nation, West met with his grandfather, Chief Sam Blue, as well as with Sally Gordon during his second visit to the reservation, which West reported lasting for six months. Other sources claim West was met with rejection by tribal leadership and was told to leave shortly after arriving. When interviewed in 1957 by William C. Sturtevant, Chief Sam Blue and his daughter-in-law Lillian said they did not believe West was Native American. "Sam Blue thought [West] had learned the few words of Catawba that he knew from Speck's books."

In a letter dated October 25, 1958, West offered assistance to Sturtevant in making contact with Indian groups in the eastern United States, notably the Wampanoag. His correspondence claimed that his mother was Catawba and his father was from Tegucigalpa, Honduras, and came from Honduran and Puerto Rican parentage. West also stated that he spoke Spanish and Portuguese as well as Native American languages including "Cayuaga, Seneca, Mohawk, Narragansett, Micmac, Passamaquoddy, Penobscot, Creek, Choctaw, Sioux [sic], and Winnebago". In addition, he claimed he was able to recognize other Indian languages when he heard them spoken.

== Marriage ==
West was briefly married to Jean Marilyn Miller, who also went by "Pretty Pony" and was "said to be a Blackfeet" [sic].

== Other activities ==
In the late 1940s he self-published a newsletter called The Indian War Drum: The Voice of the Eastern Indians.

In 1964 and 1965 he worked with G. Hubert Matthews, professor at the Massachusetts Institute of Technology. He was also able to convince Matthews that he could help document the Catawba language. Together they published five texts in 1967. Matthews included in these books West's fabricated family genealogy, listing West's nonexistent Catawba ancestors in his maternal line. West told Matthews his mother's name was “Singing Dove” and that her father was “Strong Eagle,” saying the latter was a graduate of Yale Law School and had died in 1941. However, West's mother was actually Roberta M. Hawkins West, and her father, William Ashbie Hawkins (1862-1941) was not only one of the first Black lawyers in Baltimore, but a prominent and well-known community leader, the son of the Rev. Robert Hawkins and Susan (Cobb) Hawkins, all very well-known, and well-documented African-American people.

West continued to live under the Red Thunder Cloud pretendian identity, becoming a regular presence at local fairs and even some pow wows in New England, where he would sell his herbal products called "Red Thunder Cloud's Accabonac Princess American Indian Teas".

== Death ==
West died at St. Vincent's Hospital in Worcester, Massachusetts following a stroke, January 8, 1996, at the age of 76. At the time of his death, Leonor Pena, a close friend from Central Falls, Rhode Island, gave his name as Carlos Westez. She listed his occupation as "shaman". His sister, as administrator to his will in probate court, gave his name as Cromwell Ashbie Hawkins West.

== Investigation of identity ==
Linguist and ethnologist Ives Goddard of the Smithsonian Institution confirmed that West was non-Native by way of public documents, letters, and publications. He concluded that "West's life as Red Thunder Cloud confronts us with basic questions of race and identity that are emblematic of our age." He compared West's "successful life-long masquerade" to that of Grey Owl and Buffalo Child Long Lance but added that West's extensive involvement in the Catawba language "leaves us as linguists with challenging problems of interpretation and evaluation."

== Bibliography ==
- The Shinnecock Indians of Long Island [a collection of photographs] (1963)
- The Montauk Indians of Long Island in New York State [a collection of photographs] (1975)

== Discography ==
- A Child's Introduction To The American Indian (1963)
- Songs and Legends of the Catawba (1992)
- Songs and Traditions of the Catawba (1992)

== See also ==
- Buffalo Child Long Lance
- Grey Owl
- Iron Eyes Cody
