= Bertha George Harris =

Catawba ceramic artist (1913–2014)

- Born: Bertha George; June 29, 1913
- Died: October 14, 2014 (aged 101); Rock Hill, South Carolina, U.S.
- Citizenship: Catawba Indian Nation and U.S.
- Occupation: Potter
- Spouse: George Harris
- Parent(s): Moroni and Hattie George

Bertha George Harris (June 29, 1913 – October 14, 2014) was a Catawba cultural practitioners and master potter. Harris was the oldest living member of the Catawba tribe at the time of her death in October 2014.

The Catawba number approximately 2,800 people, presently based in York County, South Carolina, as well the surrounding region.

== Early life and family ==
Harris was born Bertha George on June 29, 1913, in Lancaster County, South Carolina, to Moroni James George and Hattie Milling George. She lived in neighboring Catawba County and York Counties for the majority of her life. A resident of Rock Hill, South Carolina, she was raised under racial segregation in the American South, in which the Catawba and other Native American tribes were considered inferior to whites.

She was married to George Furman Harris for 75 years, until his death in 2006 at the age of 95. The couple had seven children.

== Art career ==
Harris created Catawba pottery and was considered one of the Catawba's master potters. Catawba pottery is composed of river clay, which is shaped without the use of a potter's wheel. Harris specialized in Catawba coil-built pottery with river clay that she harvested and processed by hand.

== Death and legacy ==
Bertha George Harris died on October 14, 2014, at the age of 101, as the oldest member of the Catawba. Her funeral was held at the Church of Jesus Christ of Latter-day Saints on the Catawba Indian Nation reservation. Gilbert Blue, the former Chief of the Catawba from 1977 to 2007, was raised with Harris' children. He paid tribute to Harris telling a reporter, "I spoke with her about her position as the oldest several times, and she held that to be important... Bertha Harris recognized what her status as the oldest meant, and not only did it make her feel something good and important, it made all of us feel good." Present Catawba Chief Bill Harris, her great-nephew, also paid tribute to her noting, "Of the Catawba people, of the people who have been here on this patch of ground for all these centuries, she was the oldest among us... That is truly a remarkable idea–that a person was the oldest of all of us on the entire earth. That was always for her and all of us a great, even sacred, honor." According to members of the Catawba, she considered it an honor to be the oldest living elder.

She was survived by five of her seven children: three daughters and two sons.

Frances Wade, who was 92 years old in October 2014, became the oldest Catawba elder following Harris' death.

== See also ==
- Brooke Bauer
- General New River
- Gilbert Blue
- Nopkehee
- Samuel Taylor Blue
- Yanbabe Yalangway
