= Brooke Bauer =

Catawba professor and ethnohistorian

- Born: ~1976-1977
- Occupations: ethnohistorian, researcher, author, professor
- Writing career
- Language: English
- Genre: non-fiction
- Subjects: Catawba, Indigenous peoples of the Northeastern Woodlands, Indigenous peoples of the Southeastern Woodlands

Brooke Michele Bauer is a citizen of the Catawba Indian Nation. She works as a Catawba ethnohistorian, author and professor who has published several books on the history of the Catawba people and other Catawban-speaking peoples of the Eastern Woodlands. She has attended conferences, published books, lectured and been on podcasts to talk about the contributions of Catawba women to the Catawba Confederacy alongside more general histories of the Catawban-speaking peoples of the Piedmont region and their interactions with British colonizers. She is the first Catawba person to earn a doctorate degree and is a speaker of the Catawba language.

== Biography ==
Map of Catawba lands in York County near the northern border of South Carolina with North Carolina.

Brooke Michele Bauer was born in the mid 1970s as one of nine children and grew up in Catawba country. During her childhood, she learned stories and how to create pottery by watching her elders and matriarchs. Two of her brothers later served in the Catawba Nation government.

Her foremothers went to various boarding schools including Carlisle Indian Industrial School, a Oklahoma Cherokee boarding school and a segregated Catawba school ran by Mormon missionaries. Unlike her foremothers, when Bauer was young she was able to attend desegregated public schools. Her and her children both faced discrimination in public schools. She graduated highschool in 1986 and delayed going to college to raise her two children.

In 2000, she decided to pursue college, receiving her bachelor's at Winthrop University in 2005. While being the director of elder care for Catawba Nation, she earned her masters at Winthrop, which she finished in December 2007. She first got into the field of Catawba studies in 2008 through her interest into the site of Catawba New Town and one of its residents, Sally New River. She then earned a Doctorate of Philosophy in History at the University of North Carolina at Chapel Hill with her graduating in May 2016.

In August 2016, she became a history professor at the University of South Carolina Lancaster to teach early American history and Native American studies. Later she served as co-director of the Native American Studies Center at the University of South Carolina Lancaster. Finished in June 2022, she successfully fought for the return of the remains of Catawba ancestors who died at Carlisle School to their country. She later moved on to being a history professor at the University of Tenneessee.

=== Awards ===
For her book, Becoming Catawba: Catawba Indian Women and Nation Building, 1540-1840, she received the 2023 Erminie Wheeler-Voegelin Book Award from the American Society for Ethnohistory and the 2020-21 Andrew W. Mellon Foundation Native American Scholars Initiative Fellowship at the American Philosophical Center in Philadelphia. She also won the Berks Conference Annual Book Prize in 2022 alongside the George C. Rogers Jr. Award from South Carolina Historical Society.

=== Bibliography ===
==== Books ====
- Interpreting the Indigenous South: Tribal Nations Confronting Race and Erasure in the U.S. Southeast (with Denise Bates). London: Routledge, 2025. ISBN 978-1-032-42173-5.
- Becoming Catawba: Catawba Indian Women and Nation-Building, 1540–1840. Tuscaloosa: University of Alabama Press, 2023. ISBN 978-0-8173-2143-7.

==== Book chapters ====
- "Sexuality and Gender Variance in Pre-1500 Native America." In Nicholas L. Syrett and Jen Manion, eds., The Cambridge History of Gender and Sexuality in the United States. Cambridge: Cambridge University Press, 2025. ISBN 978-1-108-48227-1.
- "To Have Their Children Trained Up in English Schools: Native American Childhood and Education in the Early American South." In Julia M. Gossard and Sandra S. White, eds., Engaging Children in Vast Early America. London: Routledge, 2024. ISBN 978-1-032-26822-4.
- "Catawba Women and Imperial Land Encroachment." In Max M. Blaakman and Emily Conroy-Krutz, eds., The Early Imperial Republic: From the American Revolution to the U.S.–Mexican War. Philadelphia: University of Pennsylvania Press, 2023. ISBN 978-0-8122-5278-1.
- Bauer, Michele. "Catawba Indians' Adaptive Response to Colonialism." Ethics of Anthropology and Amerindian Research: Reporting on Environmental Degradation and Warfare, edited by Richard J. Chacon and Rubén G. Mendoza, Springer, 2012, pp. 73–77
- "In My Mother's Hands." In Denise Bates, ed., We Will Always Be Here: Southern Native Peoples on Living and Thriving in the 20th Century and Beyond. Gainesville: University Press of Florida, 2016. ISBN 978-0-8130-6208-2.

==== Articles ====
- "Indigenous, Native American, or American Indian? The Limitations of Broad Terms" (with Elizabeth Ellis). Journal of the Early Republic 43, no. 1 (2023): 61–74.
- "The Catawba Indians." In Oxford Research Encyclopedia of American History. Oxford: Oxford University Press, 2019.
- "Being Catawba: The World of Sally New River, 1746–1840." PhD diss., University of North Carolina at Chapel Hill, 2016.
- "Catawba Indians' Adaptive Response to Colonialism." The South Carolina National Heritage Corridor (2011).

== See also ==
- Bertha George Harris
- General New River
- Gilbert Blue
- Nopkehee
- Samuel Taylor Blue
- Yanbabe Yalangway
