= Nation Ford Fish Weir =

Archaeological site in South Carolina, United States

- U.S. National Register of Historic Places
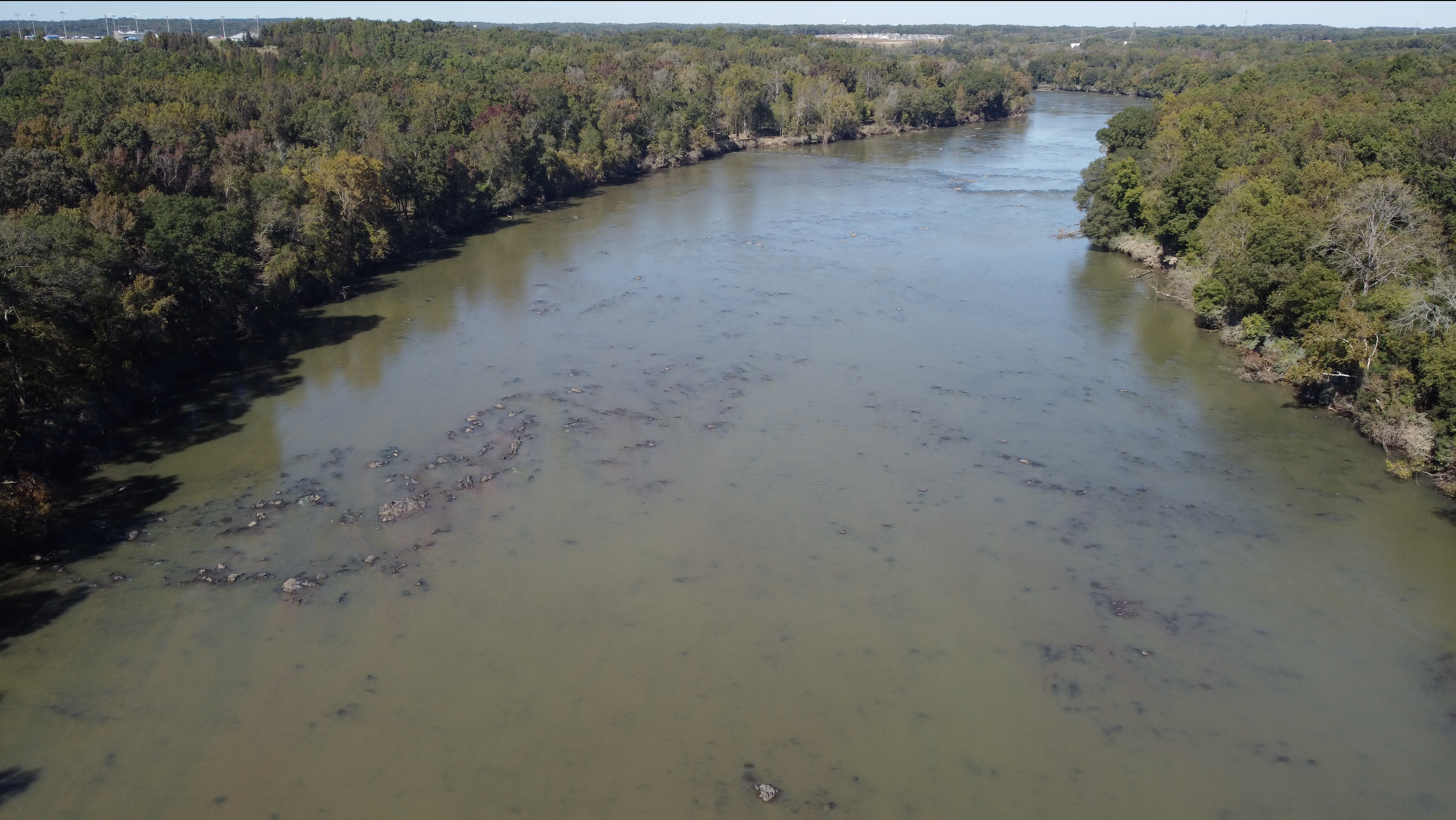

- Location within South Carolina Location within the United States
- Location: In the Catawba River approximately 1200 feet upstream from the Nation Ford railroad trestle, near Rock Hill, South Carolina
- Coordinates: 34°57′40″N 80°57′20″W
- Area: less than one acre
- MPS: Nation Ford Road Area MPS
- NRHP reference No.: 00000595
- Added to NRHP: March 1, 2007

Nation Ford Fish Weir is a historic fishing weir located near Rock Hill, South Carolina. It is one of the few relatively intact Native American fish weirs remaining in South Carolina. It is a double V-shaped rock fish trap or weir located in the channel of the Catawba River upstream from the railroad trestle at Nation Ford. The weir is located near the Nation Ford Road crossing point of the river and to several documented Catawba people villages.

It was listed on the National Register of Historic Places in 2007.
