= South Carolina Hall of Fame =

Photographic Hall of fame in South Carolina

South Carolina Hall Of Fame recognizes contemporary and past citizens of South Carolina who made outstanding contributions to the state's heritage and progress. The Hall of Fame is physically located in the Myrtle Beach Convention Center.

The Hall of Fame was originally dedicated in 1973 by Governor John C. West, and was signed into law as the official hall of fame by Governor Jim Hodges in 2001.The South Carolina State Library houses DVDs produced by South Carolina ETV that highlight the inductees.

In order to be eligible, nominees can include those originally from South Carolina who obtained recognition, or non-residents who made an impact in the state. At least one living and one deceased citizen is inducted each year.

== Inductees ==
South Carolina Hall
Name	Image	Birth–Death	Year	Category	Occupation	Reference
Bernard M. Baruch	BARUCH, BERNARD 2	(1870–1965)	1990	White Men	Statesman	
Robert D. Bass		(1904–1983)	1980	White Men	Author/Historian	
Joseph Bernadin		(1928–1996)	1988	White Men	Archbishop of Chicago	
Mary McLeod Bethune	Mary McLeod Bethune portrait	(1875–1955)	1983	African Americans	Educator	
Maj. Gen. Charles F. Bolden Jr	Charles F. Bolden, Jr	(1946–)	1999	African Americans	Astronaut	
James F. Byrnes	Senator James F Byrnes	(1879–1972)	1982	White Men	Governor	
Maude E. Callen		(1898–1990)	1990	African Americans	Nurse/Midwife	
Mary Boykin Chesnut	Mary Chesnut	(1823–1886)	1999	Women	Diarist	
Septima Poinsette Clark		(1898–1987)	2014	African Americans	Educator and civil rights activist	
Elizabeth Boatwright Coker		(1909–1993)	1992	Women	Author	
Maj. James Lide Coker	James Lide Coker	(1837–1918)	2002	White Men	Agriculturist/Manufacturer	
Pat Conroy	Pat Conroy (cropped)	(1945–2016)	2009	White Men	Acclaimed Author	
Ann Pamela Cunningham	Ann Pamela Cunningham	(1816–1875)	1985	Women	Preservationist	
William Jennings Bryan Dorn	William Jennings Bryan Dorn	(1916–2005)	1995	White Men	U.S. Representative	
David Drake		(1801–1870s)	2016	African Americans	Potter, American Artisan	
Col. Charles M. Duke Jr.	Official NASA portrait Charles Moss Duke Jr	(1935–)	1973	White Men	Astronaut	
Marian Wright Edelman	Marian Wright Edelman 01	(1939–)	2014	African Americans	Advocate for children & Activist	
Frances Ravenel Smythe Edmunds		(1916–2010)	1998	Women	Preservationist	
James B. Edwards, D.M.D.	U.S. Secretary of Energy James Edwards of South Carolina (cropped)	(1927–2014)	1997	White Men	Governor	
William G. Farrow	William G. Farrow	(1918–1942)	2013	White Men	World War II Pilot	
Ernest A. Finney Jr.		(1931–2017)	2012	African Americans	Attorney/Legislator/Jurist	
Joe Frazier	Joe Frazier	(1944–2011)	2023	African Americans	Boxer	
Susan Pringle Frost		(1873–1960)	2015	Women	Preservationist, Suffragist	
John Birks "Dizzy" Gillespie	Dizzy Gillespie holding memoir "To Be or Not to Bop"	(1917–1993)	1985	African Americans	Musician	
Lucile Godbold	Lucile Godbold 1922	(1900–1981)	2005	Women	Athlete/Educator	
Wil Lou Gray	Wil Lou Gray	(1883–1984)	1974	Women	Educator	
William S. Hall, M.D.		(1915–1995)	1975	White Men	Mental Health	
John R. Heller, M.D.		(1905–1999)	1979	White Men	Scientist	
Fritz Hollings	FritzHollings	(1922–2019)	2006	White Men	Governor/U.S. Senator	
Peter Horry		(1743/44–1815)	2007	White Men	Soldier	
Maj. Thomas Dry Howie		(1908–1944)	2003	White Men	Soldier	
Anna Hyatt Huntington		(1876–1973)	1986	Women	Sculptor	
Jasper Johns	Jasper Johns, Medal of Freedom, 2011	(1930–)	1989	White Men	Artist	
David Bancroft Johnson	David Bancroft Johnson (1856-1928) in Men Of Mark In South Carolina (1908)	(1856–1928)	2017	White Men	Educator, University President	
Rudy Mancke		(1945–2023)	2023	White Men	Naturalist and co-host of South Carolina ETV	
Francis Marion		(1732–1795)	1975	White Men	Soldier	
Robert Marvin		(1920–2001)	2001	White Men	Landscape Artist	
Benjamin Mays		(1894–1984)	1984	African Americans	Educator	
Hugh L. McColl Jr.		(1935–)	2000	White Men	Banker	
John McKissick		(1926–2019)	2005	White Men	Coach/Athletic Director	
Gov. Robert McNair	Robert McNair smiling	(1923–2007)	2004	White Men	Attorney/Governor	
Ronald Erwin McNair, Ph.D.	Ronald Erwin McNair	(1950–1986)	1997	African Americans	Scientist/Astronaut	
Roger Milliken		(1915–2010)	1993	White Men	Industrialist	
Darla Moore		(1954–)	2015	Women	Financier, Philanthropist	
Mary C. Simms Oliphant	MarySimmsOliphant	(1891–1988)	1983	Women	Author	
Matthew J. Perry		(1921–2011)	2007	African Americans	Civil Rights Activist/Judge	
Julie Mood Peterkin		(1880–1961)	1994	Women	Novelist	
Eliza Lucas Pinckney		(1722–1793)	2008	Women	Agriculturist	
Anne Worsham Richardson		(1922–2012)	1991	Women	Artist	
Bobby Richardson	Bobby Richardson - New York Yankees	(1935–)	1996	White Men	Baseball Hero	
Joseph P. Riley Jr.	Joseph P. Riley, Jr. 2010	(1943–)	2016	White Men	Mayor/Attorney/Educator	
Darius Rucker	Darius rucker (49562468842)	(1966–)	2020	African Americans	Musician, Philanthropist	
Donald Stuart Russell		(1906–1998)	1987	White Men	Senator/Judge	
Archibald Rutledge		(1883–1973)	1984	White Men	Poet Laureate	
Francis Salvador		(1747–1776)	2023	White Men	Revolutionary War Patriot, SC Legislator, Plantation Owner	
Philip Simmons	Philip Simmons 1982	(1912–2009)	1994	African Americans	Blacksmith	
Robert Smalls	Robert Smalls - Brady-Handy	(1839–1916)	2010	African Americans	State Representative, Senator, U.S. Congressman	
Gen. Jacob Edward Smart		(1909–2006)	2003	White Men	Military Leader	
Elliott White Springs	Captain Elliott White Springs	(1896–1959)	1985	White Men	Industrialist	
J. Strom Thurmond	StromThurmond	(1902–2003)	1982	White Men	Senator	
Charles H. Townes	Charles Townes and first maser	(1915–2015)	1978	White Men	Scientist	
Leo Twiggs		(1934–)	2020	African Americans	Artist, Educator, Museum Director	
Elizabeth O'Neill Verner		(1883–1979)	1998	Women	Artist, Educator	
John C. West	Gov. John C. West portrait	(1922–2004)	2002	White Men	Governor/Ambassador	
Gen. William C. Westmoreland	Gen William C Westmoreland	(1914–2005)	1986	White Men	Military Leader	
Elizabeth Evelyn Wright	ElizabethEvelynWright	(1872–1906)	2020	African Americans	Educator	
Walker Gill Wylie, M.D.	Walker Gill Wylie, M.D., New York	(1848–1923)	1996	White Men	Physician	
Cale Yarborough	CaleYarborough	(1939–2023)	2013	White Men	NASCAR Legend	
Dr. Anne Austin Young		(1892–1989)	1981	Women	Physician	
King Hagler		(c. 1700–1763)	2009	Native Americans	Catawba Indian Chief	
