= Will West Long =

Eastern Band of Cherokee Indians mask maker

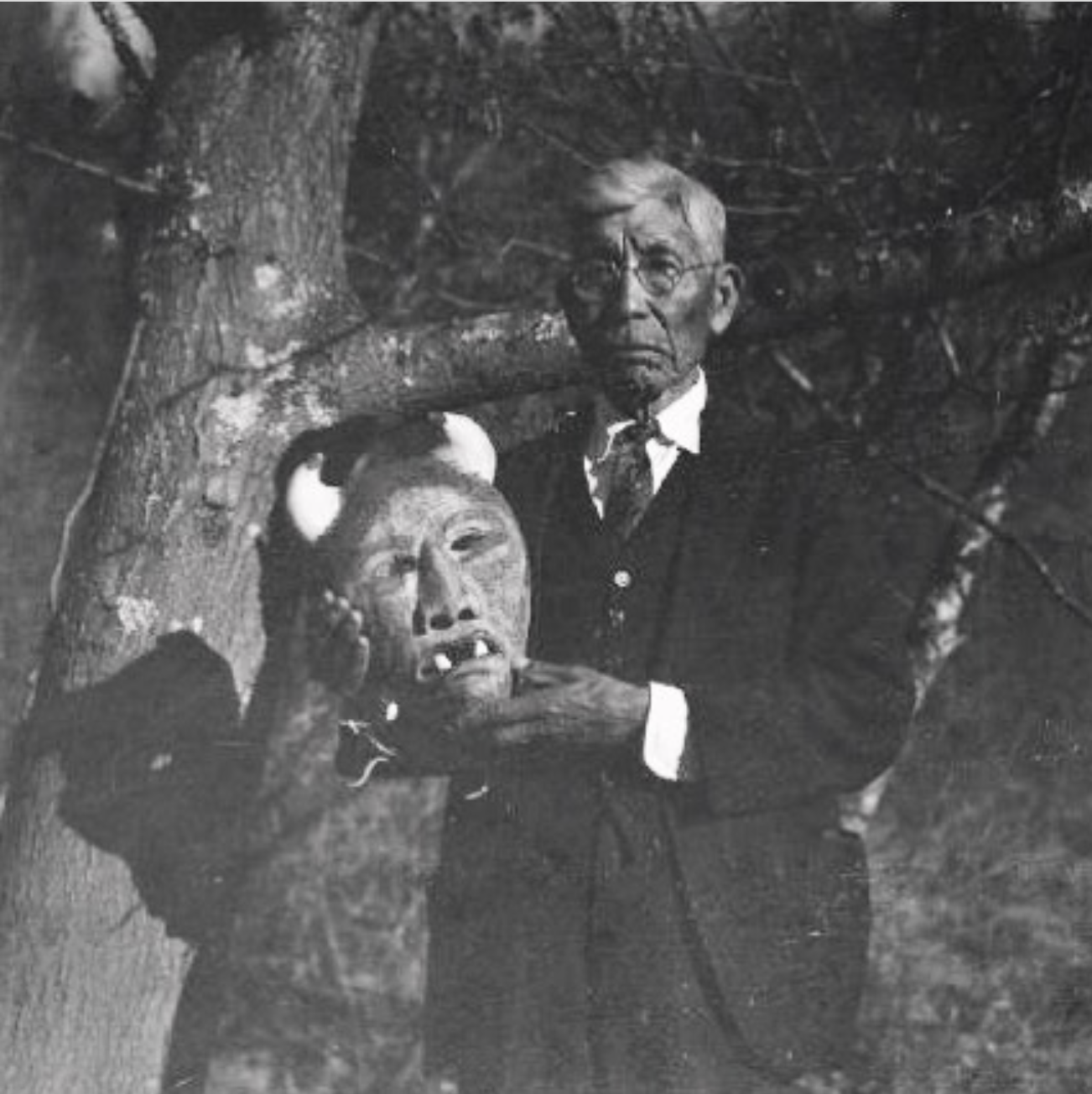
- Long c. 1925
- Born: Wili Westi c. 1869; Big Cove, North Carolina, U.S.
- Died: March 14, 1947 (aged 78); Swain County, North Carolina, U.S.
- Citizenship: Eastern Band Cherokee, American
- Education: Trinity College; Hampton Institute
- Known for: Cherokee cultural historian, mask maker

Will West Long (c. 1869–1947; née Wili Westi) was a Cherokee mask maker, translator, and Cherokee cultural historian. He was part of the Eastern Band of Cherokee Indians (Cherokee: ᏣᎳᎩᏱ ᏕᏣᏓᏂᎸᎩ, Tsalagiyi Detsadanilvgi). Long was one of the people responsible for carrying on the legacy of Cherokee cultural traditions into the 20th-century, including traditional Cherokee dance. Long was instrumental in establishing the Cherokee Fall Festival (or Cherokee Indian Fair).

== Early life and education ==
Wili Westi was born in c. 1869 in Big Cove, North Carolina. His parents were Sally Terrapin (or Ayasta), a medicine woman and John Long, a Baptist preacher. He was raised with traditional Cherokee spiritual values despite his father being a Baptist.

Long was sent to Trinity College (now Duke University) when he was age 16. After several months he ran away from the college and walked home; he remained home for a short time before going back to the college for a year. He never learned how to read or write in the Cherokee language as a child, only speak. An older college classmate from Tennessee taught him Cherokee literacy.

When he returned home from college he initially settled into farming. In 1887, ethnographer James Mooney hired Long to be his scribe and interpreter. Mooney encouraged Long to go back to school, as a result he attended Hampton Institute (now Hampton University) from 1895 to 1904.

== Career ==
For 10 years he lived and worked in New England, including in the towns and cities of Conway, Amherst, North Amherst, and Boston.

His health started to decline and his mother was getting older, around 1904 he returned to live on the Qualla. Upon his return he started a project making a systematic study of Cherokee tradition, which included the study of medicine, ritual, and "supernatural lore". Long started to work closely with Mooney again, as both men shared the goal of wanting to preserve Cherokee history. Other ethnologists and anthropologists came to work with Long including Mark R. Harrington, Frank G. Speck, William Henry Gilbert, Paul Kirchhoff, Arthur Randolph Kelly, Frans M. Olbrechts, and Leonard Broom.

He created traditional Cherokee masks for cultural use, a craft he learned from a cousin, Charley Lossiah.

As he got older, Long witnessed the Cherokee peoples dependence on the outside world and their economy. He started to share with the Cherokee the idea of the world ending (but it was outside of the Christian-meaning of Armageddon). James Mooney and Frans M. Olbrechts' "Swimmer Manuscript" was a published false statement that was damaging to Long's reputation because Olbrecht could not understand the difficulties Long faced in the acculturation process.

His son, Allen Long (1917–1983) was also a noted Cherokee mask maker. His nephew, Walker Calhoun (1918–2012) was a Cherokee medicine man, musician, dancer, and teacher.

== Death and legacy ==
At the time of his death, Long was translating and interpreting a series of books with anthropologist Frank G. Speck, and writing a Cherokee dictionary with George Myers Stephens. Long died of a heart attack on March 14, 1947, at the Qualla.

Long's masks can be found in museum collections include at the National Museum of the American Indian, and the Museum of the Cherokee Indian. The Will West Long manuscript papers are kept at the Gilcrease Museum. Many of Long's original writings are in the Frank Speck Cherokee Collection at the American Philosophical Society.

In 2020, the Museum of the Cherokee Indian in Cherokee, North Carolina held a group exhibition of Cherokee masks called "Many Faces", which included Booger masks by Long.

== Publications ==
- Speck, Frank G.; Broom, Leonard (1993). Cherokee Dance and Drama. The Civilization of the American Indian Series. Vol. 163. Will West Long (contributions). University of Oklahoma Press. ISBN 978-0-8061-2580-0.

== See also ==
- Cherokee Preservation Foundation
- Eastern Band of Cherokee Indians
