= Rudy Mancke =

American naturalist, educator (1945 – 2023)

- Born: October 21, 1945; Atlanta, Georgia
- Died: November 7, 2023 (aged 78); Columbia, South Carolina, U.S.
- Education: Wofford College
- Occupations: Educator; television host; naturalist
- Spouse: Ellen Talbert
- Children: 2

Rudolph Ernest Mancke III (October 21, 1945 – November 7, 2023) was an American naturalist, educator and television and radio host.

== Early life ==
Mancke was born in Atlanta, Georgia but grew up in Spartanburg, South Carolina. He graduated from Wofford College in 1967.

== Career ==
After serving in the U.S. Army, Mancke was a high school teacher before being hired as South Carolina State Museum's first natural history curator in 1975.

In 1978, Mancke co-hosted NatureScene with show creator Beryl Dakers, and later served as Executive Producer with co-host Jim Welch for the South Carolina Educational Television show on PBS. The theme music for the show was an arrangement of Spanish composer Francisco Tarrega's work, Estudio Brillante de Alard, retitled NatureScene Theme by guitarist Christopher Berg. The show examined the natural world, and was taped in 50 states and ten countries, with funding from a variety of sources, including the Corporation for Public Broadcasting. It aired in 200 markets across the US and in Canada.

Mancke later produced Nature Notes with South Carolina Educational Radio, a series that ran for more than 20 years.

Mancke held the post of Naturalist-in-Residence at the University of South Carolina in Columbia. He was influenced by naturalist John Muir.

In 1998, Mancke wrote a foreword for the book South Carolina Naturalists: An Anthology, 1700 - 1860, by David Taylor, published by University of South Carolina Press.

He wrote a foreword for the book A Beachcomber's Guide to Fossils, by Bob Gale, Pam Gale and Ashby Gale, published in 2020 by University of Georgia Press.

== Honors ==
In 1979, South Carolina Governor Dick Riley presented Mancke with a South Carolina Wildlife Foundation Communication Conservationist of the Year Award. In 2021, he received the organization's Lifetime Achievement Award.

In 2015, Mancke was named Honorary South Carolina Statewide Master Naturalist by Clemson University Cooperative Extension.

The McKissick Museum at the University of South Carolina launched the Rudy Mancke Curator of Natural History Endowment, in celebration of its 40th anniversary.

Mancke received honorary doctorate degrees from the College of Charleston, Winthrop University and Wofford College.

In 1993, Mancke was awarded the Order of the Palmetto, South Carolina's highest civilian honor, by Governor Carroll A. Campbell Jr.

== Death ==
Mancke died, aged 78, on November 7, 2023, of liver disease.

== Legacy ==
Mancke founded the South Carolina Association of Naturalists.

South Carolina-based political cartoonist Robert Arial paid tribute to Mancke with a special cartoon.

In 2024, Mancke was inducted into the South Carolina Hall of Fame.
