= Samuel Taylor Blue =

Chief of the Catawba Nation (1872–1959)

Chief of the Catawba Nation
- In office 1931–1943
- Preceded by: John Brown
- Succeeded by: Douglas Harris
- In office 1956–1958
- Preceded by: John Idle Sanders
- Succeeded by: Albert Sanders

Personal details
- Born: August 15, 1872 Catawba, South Carolina, U.S.
- Died: April 16, 1959 (aged 86) Catawba, South Carolina, U.S.
- Resting place: Church of Jesus Christ of Latter-day Saints Cemetery, Catawba, South Carolina, U.S.
- Spouses: Minnie Hester George; Louisa Hester Jean Canty
- Occupation: Politician
- Known for: Last native speaker of the Catawba language

Samuel Taylor Blue (1872–1959) was a Native American Chief of the Catawba Nation from 1931 to 1938, 1941–1943, and 1956–1958. He was a leading figure in the tribal community, whether or not he was formally serving as Chief at that time. A strong advocate for cultural preservation, Blue and his mother, Margaret George Brown, were the last known native speakers of the Catawba language.

== Personal life ==
Samuel Blue was the son of Anglo-American Samuel Blue and his Catawba wife Margaret George Brown. His mother was one of the last native speakers of Catawba.

In July 1887 Blue married Minnie Hester George. She died in late 1896 or early 1897. After this Blue married Louisa Hester Jean Canty.

Blue had three children by his first wife. Blue and his second wife Louisa had somewhere between nine and 20 children. Some have alleged that as many as 11 of these children were stillborn.

== Tribal politics ==
Blue first entered politics in 1905 when he was made a member of the interim governing council of the tribe along with Lewis Gordon and Ben T. Harris. They then supported the successful election of David Adam Harris as chief of the Catawba. In 1909 Blue was among those who signed the Catawba petition for United States citizenship. He also was a signer of the subsequent 1937 citizenship request. While Native Americans as a whole were granted citizenship by the United States in 1924, South Carolina did not recognize their citizenship until 1944. Native Americans like Blue were functionally treated as non-citizens in the 1930s - leading to the second citizenship petition.

Blue was first elected Chief of the Catawba in 1928. Blue made regular trips to Columbia, South Carolina where he would speak to the state legislature on behalf of the interests of the Catawba. In 1929 Blue began the process of trying to settle Catawba land claims, a process not completed until 1993. Blue was also a key figure in the process of the Catawba gaining federal recognition which was completed in 1941. He also was one of the main advocates of the Catawba accepting termination of federal wardship in at the time of his death. He ended his service as chief in 1939 but remained a respected figure in the Tribe. He was again elected chief in 1956.

== Religious beliefs ==
Initially raised in the Catawba traditional beliefs, on May 7, 1897, Blue was also baptized into the Church of Jesus Christ of Latter-day Saints in South Carolina. Blue also served as branch president of the branch of The Church of Jesus Christ of Latter-day Saints on the Catawba Reservation. In the early 20th century he would often help missionaries escape mobs. In 1950 Blue traveled to Salt Lake City and gave a talk at General Conference. During this trip Blue and his wife Louisa were sealed in the Salt Lake Temple. In 1952 Blue was a speaker at the dedication of the Catawba Branch Meetinghouse, a dedication performed by David O. McKay.

Blue served as Branch President until his death in 1959, serving a total of 40 years as branch president. At the time of his death he had 119 grand children. Two of his great-grandchildren, Roger Trimnal and Gloria Trimnal, were then students at Brigham Young University.

== Cultural preservation ==
Blue was a major advocate of the continuation of Catawba culture. He was influenced by Catawba Elder Tom Steven's promotion of stomp dances among the Catawba and worked hard to preserve the Bear Dance and the Wild Goose Dance. Frank G. Speck used Blue's knowledge of the Catawba language, and his work in the field of language preservation, in his books on the Catawba language. Like King Hagler and many others before him, he was also a strong opponent of alcohol consumption by the Catawba.

Shortly after his death the play Kah-who Catawba ("The Story of the Catawba"), was produced with the narrator of the play cast as Blue.

== See also ==
- Bertha George Harris
- Brooke Bauer
- General New River
- Gilbert Blue
- Nopkehee
- Yanbabe Yalangway
