= King Yanabe Yalangway =

Chief of the Catawba Nation

King of the Catawba
- In office c. 1746–1750
- Preceded by: Iscountgonita
- Succeeded by: Hagler

Personal details
- Died: 1750 South Carolina, British America
- Cause of death: Murder

King Yanabe Yalangway was the eractasswa (chief) of the Catawba Indian Nation, sometime around the 1740s. Not much is known about him other than the fact that he preceded King Hagler as chief. His training was evidently under "king" Whitmannetaughehee's leadership.

As a warrior he served during a longstanding state of warfare with northern tribes, particularly the Haudenosaunee Seneca, and the Lenape.

In 1738, a smallpox epidemic broke out in South Carolina. It caused many deaths among the Anglo-Americans, the Catawba and other related tribes. After this epidemic, Yanabe Yalangway became the leader or Eractasswa of the Catawba people, not necessarily as Whitmannetaugheehee's direct successor. The Sissipahaw, Shakori, Enoke and possibly some other small tribes were absorbed into the Catawba people to survive themselves and to strengthen Yanabe Yalangway's people.

Yanabe Yalangway was the Eractasswa of the Catawba people when, in 1744, the Treaty of Lancaster, made at Lancaster, Pennsylvania, renewed the Covenant Chain between the Haudenosaunee and the colonists and the governor of Virginia, who had not been able to prevent settlers going into Haudenosaunee territory, offered the tribe payment for their land claim. The peace was probably final for the Haudenosaunee, who had established the Ohio Valley as their preferred hunting ground by right of conquest, but the more western tribes continued warfare against the Catawba, who were now so reduced as for their own number that they could raise little resistance. In 1744 the Natchez and Pedee attacked and killed several Catawba people and the Catawba drove them into European settlements. During "King George's War" (1744-1748) the Shawnee and, eventually, the Cherokee (but southern Shawnee were sometimes called "Cherokee") made their attacks against the Catawba and, when the Catawba tried to find a refuge in the Carolinian settlements, against these settlements too. "King" Yanabe Yalangway had to deal with these very difficult years and led the Catawba through a crucial period.

He was murdered in 1750 by a band of Haudenosaunee, during a period of conflict with the Haudenosaunee from the North. He was on his way home from Charleston following a conference with South Carolina's Colonial Governor James Glen.

== See also ==
- Bertha George Harris
- Brooke Bauer
- General New River
- Gilbert Blue
- Nopkehee
- Samuel Taylor Blue
