= General New River =

General New River was a Native American leader of the Catawba tribe. The General took the name New River after he killed a great Shawnee chief in battle in 1732 on the New River in North Carolina. He was chief of the Catawba from 1780 to 1801 after King Prow was "deposed" at the beginning of the American Revolutionary War. He was the son-in-law of King Haigler/Hagler/Heigler or Nopkehee. General New River was probably born circa 1725.

He married Sally Scott-Toole, daughter of King Hagler's daughter and the white Indian Trader, Matthew Toole.

Elkanah Watson in 1786 called him New River, alias Scott. Of course, Watson did not take in account the fact that Sally's maiden name was Scott-Toole, her biological father was Matthew Toole, and her stepfather William Scott.

He served in the Revolutionary War, allied with the Colonies. He was recorded on the Muster Roll List of Captain Thomas Drennan. He served in the Snow Campaign of 1775, under Col. Richard Richardson, whose forces near Fort 96, South Carolina, recaptured gunpowder that was intended for the Cherokee. He led a Catawba force of 35 warriors under Maj. William Richardson Davie at the Battle of Hanging Rock, South Carolina in 1780. He was additionally involved in the Battle of Guilford Court House, North Carolina in 1781.

The General, according to R. A. Springs, was "more than ordinary", and held his power through his wife and the respect the Catawba had for her.

In 1786, he presented a petition on behalf of his people to save their hunting rights. "We your Petitioners, therefore Humbly pray that your Honers out of your great goodness would put a stop to such a glaring breach of Humanity and gratitude, and grant us such privileges of hunting in this state, as in your wisdom you shall think fitt [sic], and we your petitioners as in duty bound shall every pray." While Governor Moultrie was sympathetic, the petition was referred to a committee and the Catawba hunting rights were affirmed by a resolution of the House, the situation probably never changed much.

The story was told of the General sucking snake venom from James Spratt, son of Kanawha Spratt, that saved James' life. The General gave the Spratts the land on the reservation. (This is just one version of who gave the land on the reservation to the Spratts.) General New River even borrowed Thomas Spratt’s horse at one time. The General rode the horse hard and Spratt beat him for this infraction. The irony was, that later Spratt killed the same horse, doing exactly what he had beaten General New River for doing.

The General was described by Elkhana Watson in fairly admirable fashion, "his face showed powerful traits of mind and character" while Watson's other description of the Indians was not that generous. Reverend Thomas Coke, the Methodist preacher, described him as: "a tall, grave old man, (who) walked with a mighty staff in his hand: Round his neck he wore a narrow piece (I Think) of leather, which hung down before and was adorned with a great variety of bits of silver. He also had a silver gorget. Almost all the men and women wore silver nose-rings hanging from the middle gristle of the nose, and some of them had little hearts hanging from the rings."

The General died in 1804 at Kings Bottom.

Out of the Mist to Kings Mountain by Shawn C. Roberts is a novel about the Revolutionary War in the South. Some of New River's war time experiences are depicted in this historical novel.

== See also ==
- Bertha George Harris
- Brooke Bauer
- Gilbert Blue
- Nopkehee
- Samuel Taylor Blue
- Yanbabe Yalangway
- Spratt Cemetery
