= Catawba language =

Language spoken by the Catawba people

Catawba
- Ye Iswąˀ, Katába nieyé wuininare
- Native to: United States
- Region: South Carolina
- Ethnicity: Ye Iswąre (Catawba), possibly Saraw (Cheraw).
- Extinct: 1959, with the death of Samuel Taylor Blue
- Revival: 1989
- Language family: Siouan–Catawban: Catawban; Catawba

Language codes
- ISO 639-3: chc
- Glottolog: cata1286
- ELP: Catawba
- Linguasphere: 64-ABA-ab
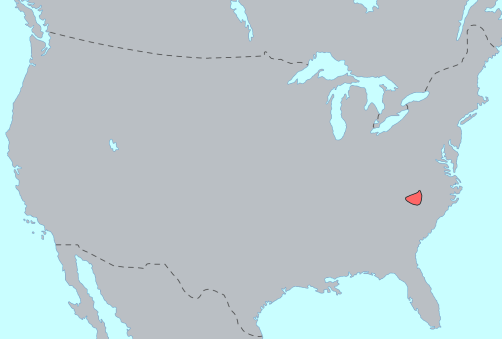
- Pre-contact distribution of the Catawba language.

- Catawba is classified as Extinct by the UNESCO Atlas of the World's Languages in Danger

Catawba (/kəˈtɔːbə/ kə-TAW-bə) is one of two Catawban languages of the eastern US, which together with the Siouan languages forms the Siouan–Catawban languages. The last native, fluent speaker of Catawba was Samuel Taylor Blue, who died in 1959. The Catawba people are now working to revitalize and preserve the Catawba language.

== Dialects ==
The Catawba language has two documented dialects, Esaw and Saraw. Scholar Ives Goddard wrote the Saraw and Esaw dialects of Catawba presumably descend specifically from the Cheraw and the Esaw. Both dialects lasted into the 20th century.

== Phonology ==
=== Consonants ===
		Labial	Alveolar	Palatal	Velar	Glottal
Plosive	voiceless	p ⟨p⟩	t ⟨t⟩		k ⟨k⟩	ʔ ⟨ʔ⟩
Plosive	voiced	b ⟨b⟩	d ⟨d⟩		(g ⟨g⟩)	
Affricate				tʃ ⟨č⟩		
Nasal		m ⟨m⟩	n ⟨n⟩			
Fricative			s ⟨s⟩	ʃ ⟨š⟩		h ⟨h⟩
Trill			r ⟨r⟩			
Approximant		w ⟨w⟩		j ⟨y⟩		

- /ʃ/ rarely occurs.
- [ɡ] occurs as an allophone of /k/.

=== Vowels ===
Short vowels
	Front	Back
Close	i ⟨i⟩	u ⟨u⟩
Mid	e ⟨ɛ⟩	
Open	a ⟨α⟩	

Long vowels
	Front	Back
Close	iː ⟨ii⟩	uː ⟨uu⟩
Mid	eː ⟨e⟩	
Open	aː ⟨a⟩	

Nasalised vowels
	Front	Back
Close	ĩ ⟨į⟩	ũ ⟨ų⟩
Mid	ẽ ⟨ę⟩	
Open	ã ⟨ą⟩	

- Short vowel sounds /i, e, a, u/ can be heard as lax, ranging to [ɪ, ɛ~ə, ɑ, ʊ].
- /u/ can range to [o], and a short /a/ can range to a central vowel [ə] or a back vowel sound [ɑ].

== Orthography ==
A Catawba alphabet was created by the Catawba Language Project for the Catawba language, as part of a revitalization effort for the language and the creation of an app for it.

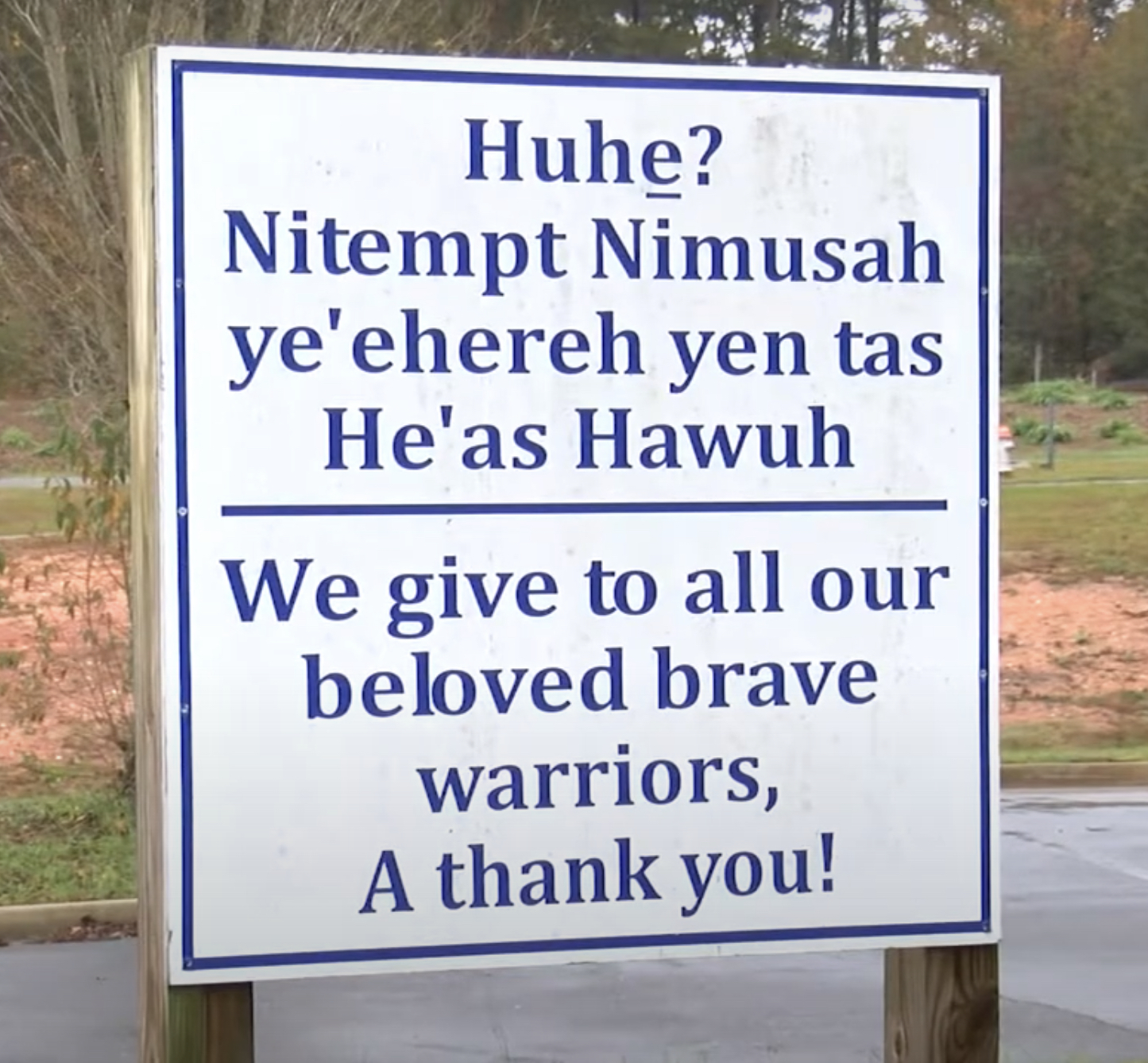
Sign in Catawba

(Ye Iswąʔre) Catawba alphabet
A a	α	Ą ą	B b	Č č
[aː]	[a]~[ə]	[ã]	[b]	[t͡ʃ]
D d	E e	Ɛ ɛ	Ę ę	G g
[d]	[eː]	[e]	[ẽ]	[g]
H h	ʰ	ʔ	I i	Ii ii
[h]	[ʰ]	[ʔ]	[i]	[iː]
Į į	K k	M m	N n	P p
[ĩ]	[k]	[m]	[n]	[p]
R r	S s	T t	U u	Uu uu
[r]	[s]~[ʃ]	[t]	[u]	[uː]
Ų ų	W w	Y y	Á á	ά
[ũ]	[w]	[j]	[áː]	[á]~[ə́]
Ą́ ą́	É é	Ɛ́ έ	Ę ę	Í í
[ã́]	[é]	[ɛ́]	[ẽ]	[í]
Íí íí	Į́ į́	Ú ú	Úú úú	Ų́ ų́
[íː]	[ĩ́]	[ú]	[úː]	[ṹ]

- The aspirated ⟨ʰ⟩ is used in the word: hawuʰ 'thank you'.
- The ⟨ʔ⟩ is written in different ways like ⟨ɂ⟩ and ⟨ˀ⟩ in some texts.
- The ⟨o⟩ and ⟨ǫ⟩ is some time occurs in words like example, mǫ(hare) meaning 'ask', wǫ meaning 'call', mǫhee meaning 'ice', and sota meaning Santee Tribe.
- There is a rare instance where the "sh" sound is written as "c" rather than "s"

== Documentation ==
Red Thunder Cloud, born Cromwell Ashbie Hawkins West, claimed to be Catawba and the last speaker of the Catawba language. He worked with anthropologist Frank Speck in a small capacity, who introduced West to the Catawba community. Some sources claim that the Catawba told Speck that West was not Catawba, but Speck ignored them and continued to promote West and include him in his work, even recommending him as an expert to other anthropologists. Other sources say he was aware and considered him a non-native speaker of the language. At his death in 1996 it was revealed that West was neither Catawba nor even Native American, but had learned what he knew of the language from books, and from listening to the last known native speaker, Samuel Taylor Blue and his half-sister, Sally Gordon, when Speck brought him to the Catawba reservation. While not a native speaker, he was the last speaker of the language when he died.

In another source, Speck claimed the last speakers of the language were two women, Samson Owl and Sally Brown. Speck worked earlier with Sally Brown and her family to create written works in their language, yet they became known for having incorrect translations into English. It was common for anthropologists, even for unpublished texts, to have translations into English that weren't entirely faithful to the meanings of the writings. While Speck did not get the translations perfect, he did get record of stories and traditions of the Catawba. Speck worked with Samson Owl to get record and translations of parts of oral stories usually told to Catawba children. He included more words than the direct translation covered, and some error in translation comes from that practice. Speck attempted to gain more accuracy of his writings through repetition of the stories, yet some words were never confirmed.

== Bibliography ==
- Fitts, Mary Elizabeth (2017). Fit for War: Sustenance and Order in the Mid-Eighteenth-Century Catawba Nation. Gainesville, FL: University of Florida Press. ISBN 9781683400059. LCCN 2017001732.
- Bauer, Brooke M. (2023). Frank, Andrew K.; Hudson, Angela Pulley; Ray, Kristofer (eds.). Becoming Catawba: Catawba Indian Women and Nation-Building, 1540–1840. Indians and Southern History. Tuscaloosa, AL: The University of Alabama Press. ISBN 978-0- 8173- 9427- 1. OCLC 1350429789.
- Rudes, Blair A. (2004). "Multilingualism in the South". In Bender, Margaret Clelland (ed.). Linguistic Diversity in the South: Changing Codes, Practices, and Ideology, Volume 37. Athens, GA: University of Georgia Press. ISBN 9780820325859.
- Heath, Charles L. (2004). Davis, R. P. Stephen Jr. (ed.). "Catawba Militarism: Ethnohistorial and Archaeological Overviews" (PDF). North Carolina Archaeology. 53. Chapel Hill, NC: University of North Carolina and The North Carolina Archaeological Society Inc.: 80–120.
