= King Hagler =

Chief of the Catawba Nation

- Nopkehee

Chief (Eractasswa or Arataswa) of the Catawba
- In office 1754–1763
- Preceded by: Yanabe Yalangway

Personal details
- Born: Nopkehee c. 1700 Carolina, British America
- Died: August 30, 1763 (aged 63) (en route to) Twelve Mile Creek, South Carolina, British America
- Cause of death: Murder
- Known for: Advocating for Native American rights

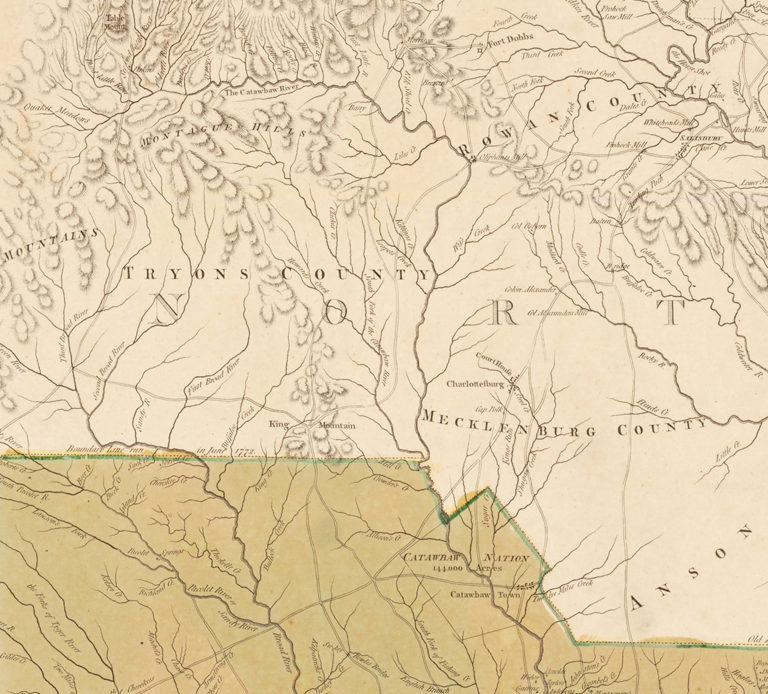
1775 map showing Native American lands in North and South Carolina, and part of Georgia. Tribes shown include the Meherrin and Tuscarora in northeastern North Carolina, the Catawba south of Mecklenburg County, and the Cherokee in the far western part of the state.

King Hagler (also spelled Haiglar and Haigler) or Nopkehee (c. 1700–1763) was a chief of the Catawba Native American tribe from 1754 to 1763. Hagler is known as the "Patron Saint of Camden, South Carolina." He was the first Native American to be inducted into the South Carolina Hall of Fame. He is known for opposing the sale of alcohol to Catawbas and other Native Americans, and encouraged the Catawba people to abstain from alcohol. He worked to negotiate fair land rights and treaties for the Catawba people.

== Origins of his name ==
Like other Native American Nations, the Catawba do not use European titles of royalty among themselves. Merrell gives Hagler's title among the Catawba as Eractasswa or Arataswa, which the Catawba translate as "Chief"; "King" is the English translation and conception, though many Catawba adopted this nomenclature for ease of communication with the settlers. Hagler is also known by several other names and other spellings, such as King Haigler, Haiglar, Nopkehe, Arataswa and Oroloswa. Hagler's anglicized name is possibly a nickname derived from his tendency to bargain or "haggle" over political decisions, although there is no conclusive evidence to support this.

== Early life ==
Hagler was probably born around 1700 in the region traditionally occupied by the Catawba along the Catawba River in what is now North Carolina. Little is known of Hagler's early life. He may have attended a European school in Virginia, because in April 1717 King Whitmannetaughehee agreed to send eleven Catawba boys to be educated for one year at Fort Christanna in Virginia. The boys were in fact hostages sent to guarantee the Catawba's promise to withdraw from the Yamasee War. Hagler may have been one of these boys, which would account for his fluency in English, much commented-on in contemporary records.

== Election as chief ==
Hagler became Eractasswa (Chief) after the death of King Yanabe Yalangway, who was murdered by a group of Iroquois warriors in October 1750. In keeping with Catawba tradition, the new chief (Hagler) was the former chief's sister's son. Immediately after Yalangway's death, Hagler was elected by the Catawba General Council to lead the tribe. Tribal politics were in chaos at the time, as fifteen of the most prominent Catawba leaders had attended a conference in Charles Town in the fall of 1749 and had all died of infectious diseases acquired from European settlers. In spite of the danger, Hagler traveled to Charleston in late 1750 to receive a military commission as Chief of the Catawbas from Governor James Glen, a form of colonial recognition of tribal leaders.

== Peace treaties with other Native American groups ==
One of Hagler's first tasks was to negotiate a peace treaty with the Iroquois Six Nations. In June 1751 Hagler, accompanied by Lieutenant Governor William Bull and a delegation of Catawba leaders, attended a peace conference in Albany, New York, where Hagler smoked a peace pipe with the Mohawk leader Hendrick Theyanoguin. In 1752 an Iroquois delegation visited the Catawba and an exchange of prisoners followed. The Catawba also brokered a peace treaty with the Shawnee, who were not members of the Six Nations federation. The Catawba were invited to incorporate with the Cherokee but Hagler refused this offer.

== Opposition to the sale of alcohol to the Catawba ==
Hagler became well known for being one of the first Native American leaders to publicly oppose the sale and distribution of alcohol in Indigenous communities. On August 29, 1754, in a speech in Catawba to James Carter and Alexander Osborne, Commissioners of the State of North Carolina, he stated:

Brothers, here is One thing You Yourselves are to Blame very much in: That is, You Rot Your grain in Tubs, out of which you take and make Strong Spirits. You sell it to our young men and give it them; many times they get very Drunk with it. This is the Very Cause that they oftentimes Commit those Crimes that is offensive to You and us and all thro' the Effect of that Drink. It is also very bad for our people, for it Rots their guts and Causes our men to get very sick and many of our people has Lately Died by the Effects of that strong Drink, and I heartily wish You would do something to prevent Your People from Daring to Sell or give them any of that Strong Drink.

On 26 May 1756, he met with North Carolina Chief Justice Peter Henley in Salisbury, North Carolina to discuss the provisions of a recent treaty. Hagler took another opportunity to decry the sale of alcohol to the Catawba:

I desire a stop may be put to the selling of strong Liquors by the White people to my people especially near the Indian Nation. If the White people make strong drink, let them sell it to one another or drink it in their own Families. This will avoid a great deal of mischief which otherwise will happen from my people getting drunk and quarreling with the White people.

Hagler also attempted to discipline Catawbas who committed crimes while intoxicated, contrary to the traditional Catawba custom of pardoning such behavior as a form of temporary madness. In 1754 Hagler supported the execution of a Catawba warrior who, while drunk, had murdered a young girl. The execution was carried out by the perpetrator's cousin in the presence of colonial witnesses, "the White people, in Order to shew our Willingness to punish such offenders."

In response to Hagler's complaints, regulations adopted at the Augusta Conference of 1767 attempted to limit the amount of alcohol brought into Native American communities: "Any Trader who by himself, substitute, or servant, shall carry more than fifteen Gallons of Rum, at any one time, into any nation of Indians...shall forfeit his bond and license."

== Hagler and Catawba land rights ==
=== Catawba Fort ===
In May 1756 Hagler was asked to provide Catawba warriors to support the British during the French and Indian War (1754-1763), and he pledged to contribute the services of forty warriors. In return, Hagler requested that North Carolina Governor Arthur Dobbs supply gifts and ammunition and construct a fort to protect the Catawba while their warriors were away fighting for the British. Dobbs reluctantly agreed, and a site was selected. He purchased 640 acres from the Catawba just west of modern day Fort Mill, South Carolina. He then sent Captain Hugh Waddell and a company of 50 Provincial soldiers to build the fort. The project was interrupted several times due to the interference of Governors Bull and Lyttelton of South Carolina. The North Carolina fort project was abandoned in August, 1757, after the Catawba requested South Carolina build them the fort instead. Governor Dobbs wrote:

"[After] we had wrought 3 or 4 months upon the Fort, [the Catawba] sent down to Governor William Lyttelton to stop building the Fort; they will not have it built by us but by them."

The Catawba were angry that Governor Dobbs had continued to approve land grants to white settlers on land that the Catawba had considered to be their traditional homeland. Surveyors had been running surveys through Catawba communities and desecrating burial grounds. In April 1759, King Hagler and a delegation of Catawba Indians traveled to Charleston to ask Governor Lyttleton to construct a fort. Governor Lyttelton appropriated funds for the construction, as he was anxious to maintain the Catawba as allies against the Cherokees. In early 1761, during the Anglo-Cherokee War, Catawba warriors joined British regulars and South Carolina provincials in fighting against the Cherokees, who were eventually forced into a peace accord. Lyttelton then commissioned surveyor and Indian trader Samuel Wyly (also spelled Wylie) to build the new Catawba fort. In 1761, Wyly and his crew erected a wooden stockade near present-day Van Wyck, South Carolina. However, as hostilities with the Cherokees had ended, neither the Catawba nor provincial troops ever garrisoned the fort.

=== Pine Tree Hill Treaty ===
Between 1738 and 1759, a series of smallpox epidemics ravaged Native American communities along the east coast of North America. In the fall of 1758, twenty-five Catawba warriors returning from General John Forbes' campaign against the French, brought smallpox to South Carolina. By 1759, the Catawba nation had been severely reduced, so that no more than a thousand Catawbas survived. European settlers began encroaching on the Catawbas' traditional lands, now sparsely populated, leading Hagler to negotiate the Pine Tree Hill Treaty in 1760, with Edmond Atkin, Superintendent of Indian Affairs for the Southern District at Camden, South Carolina (then known as Pine Tree Hill). This guaranteed the Catawba a territory near Waxhaw, North Carolina occupying some two million acres along the Catawba River, in exchange for 55,000 square miles that the Catawba considered to be their traditional home, occupying part of North Carolina and much of South Carolina and extending into Virginia.

Mortality from smallpox, influenza and other infections continued to reduce the Catawba population. On July 5, 1762, Governor Arthur Dobbs wrote: "Their number of Warriors have been reduced in a few years, by Haglar's Confession, from 300 to 50 and all their males do not exceed 100, old and young included, so they are now scarce a nation but a small village."

== Death and burial ==
On August 30, 1763, Hagler was in the Waxhaws, a Waxhaw community in the Piedmont region of North and South Carolina, when he was ambushed and killed by a band of seven Shawnees. He was reportedly shot six times. His death was reported by the Presbyterian missionary William Richardson (1729-1771), (uncle of North Carolina governor William Richardson Davie), who wrote in a letter to Richard Richardson: "Yesterday the enemy killed King Hagler almost in the midst of our settlement, which caused such Terror that there was nothing but running and flying wherever safety could be had."

The motive for the murder was never clearly determined. Hagler was interred with his most valuable possessions, but the grave site was desecrated by white settlers soon after his burial. His body was later moved to a secret location.

== Succession ==
Hagler was succeeded in November by a man whom colonial authorities referred to as "Colonel Ayers," "Captain Jacob Ayers," or "Captain Aires," and who may have been Hixa-Uraw. He was "elected" by a vote at a special congress in Augusta, Georgia in November, 1763, but later "fell out of favor with the South Carolina government." On 29 January, 1765, a meeting of Catawbas under the supervision of Samuel Wyly elected Captain Frow to replace Ayers. On 31 May, 1768, Frow claimed to have hunted down and killed six of the Shawnee warriors who killed King Haglar and presented their scalps to Governor William Bull.

== Legacy ==
James H. Merrell characterizes Hagler as a shrewd negotiator who struck a balance between preserving Catawba tradition and adapting to the pressures of the growing colonial population:

On the one hand, [Hagler] operated within a dual colonial and Catawba framework he had not constructed and could not escape. He was not the first Eractasswa to acknowledge his people's dependence upon Anglo-America, nor was he the first to negotiate with colonial officials...On the other hand, however, Nopkehe was particularly well suited by background and temperament to fulfill the simultaneous demands of old and young, settlers and distant officials. By birth and upbringing he fit a traditional mold; through experience he had learned at once the futility of challenging colonial society openly and the means of manipulating that society covertly...At a critical time in the life of the Nation Hagler was instrumental in maintaining intercultural peace and internal unity, charting a course through the troubled waters of depopulation, dependence, and despair on which so many other Indian nations foundered.

== Memorialization ==
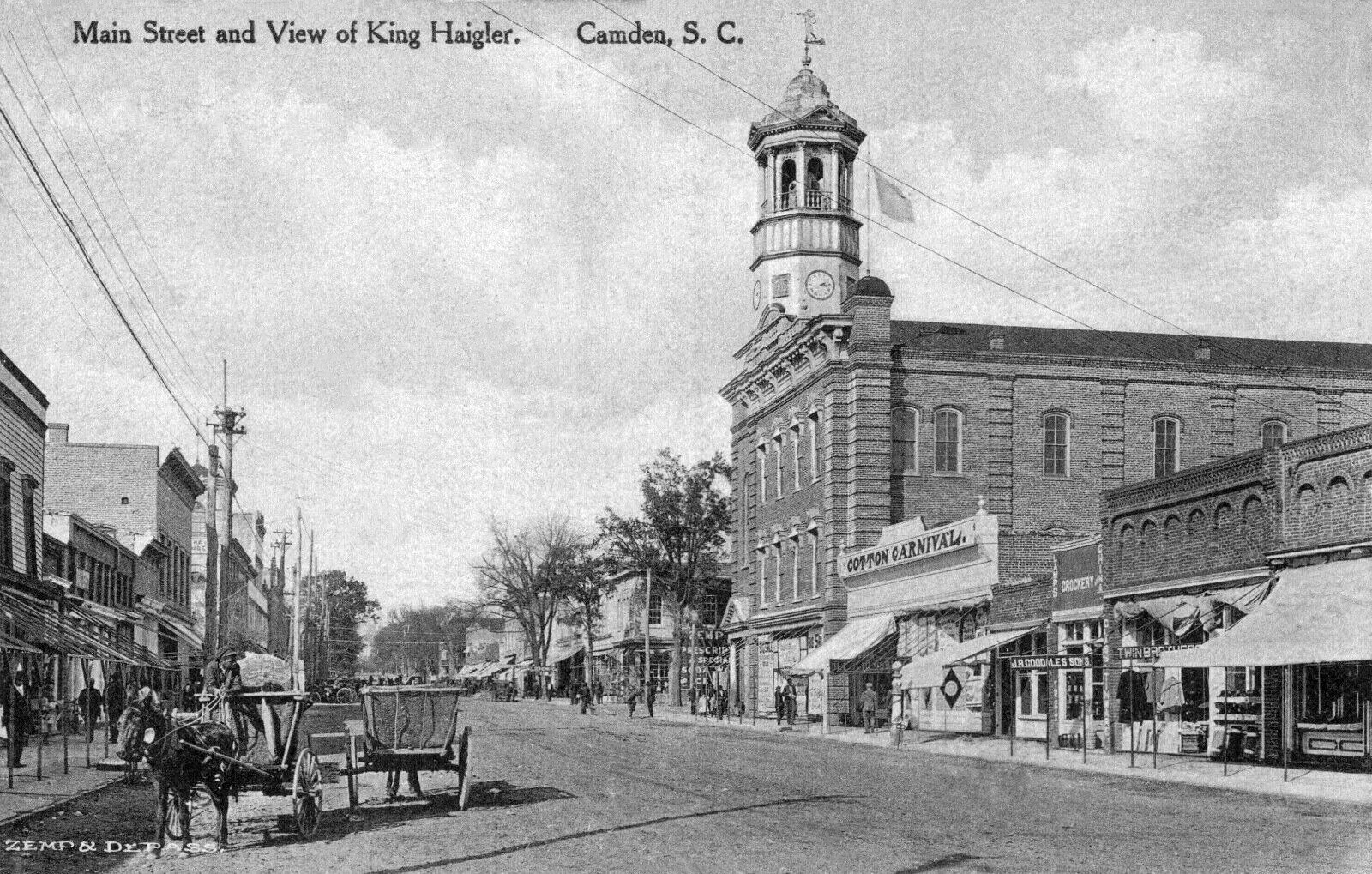
The King Hagler weather vane atop the Camden Opera House, 1920.

- A weather vane depicting "King Haigler" with a bow and arrow was created by J. B. Mathieu in 1826 and placed on the opera house tower in Camden, South Carolina. It can be seen today on the city hall tower in Camden.
- A portrait of King Hagler hangs in the South Carolina Hall of Fame, located inside the Myrtle Beach Convention Center in Myrtle Beach, SC. He was inducted in 2009.
- In October, 2012 a statue by Maria J. Kirby-Smith depicting King Hagler meeting Colonel Joseph Kershaw (1727-1791) was unveiled on Market Street in downtown Camden.
- In December, 2014 sculptor Chas Fagan created a statue depicting King Hagler meeting Thomas Spratt, one of the first European settlers in what is today Charlotte, North Carolina.
- The Catawba Two Kings Casino is named after Hagler and the city of Kings Mountain, North Carolina.

== See also ==
- Alcohol and Native Americans
- Bertha George Harris
- Brooke Bauer
- General New River
- Gilbert Blue
- History of North Carolina
- History of South Carolina
- Native American temperance activists
- Samuel Taylor Blue
- Yanbabe Yalangway
