= Catawba Two Kings Casino =

Casino in North Carolina, United States

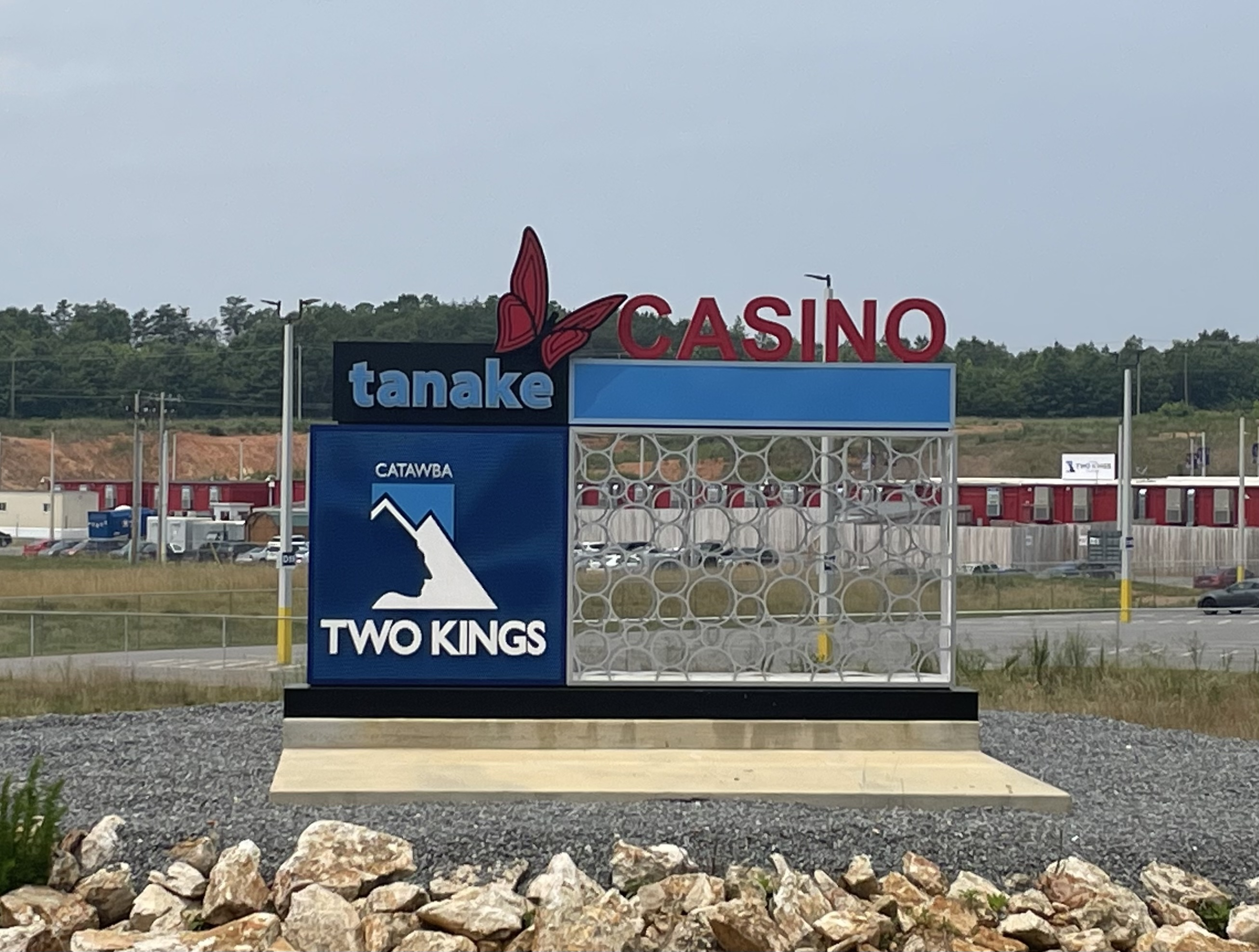
- Temporary casino is operating while the final resort is under construction
- Interactive map of Catawba Two Kings Casino
- Location: Kings Mountain, North Carolina; 538 Kings Mountain Blvd; 35.20205°N 81.37201°W
- Opened: July 1, 2021 (temporary)
- Gaming space: 30,000 sq ft (2,800 m^{2})
- Casino type: Land-based
- Owner: Catawba Indian Nation
- Architect: SOSHNY
- Website: twokingscasino.com

Catawba Two Kings Casino is a tribal casino in Kings Mountain, North Carolina, overlooking Interstate 85, approximately 35 miles (56 km) west of Charlotte. The casino is owned by the Catawba Indian Nation, in partnership with Delaware North, which has been serving as a consultant for the tribe, helping with the management and development of the project since 2019. In 2021, a temporary "pre-launch" casino opened on the property and continues to operate while construction of the permanent casino is ongoing. The temporary casino consists of red modular buildings and currently offers 1,000 slot machines and electronic table games, a retail sportsbook, and a restaurant. The facility also expanded to add 12 live table games including craps, roulette, mini baccarat, blackjack, Mississippi stud poker and three-card poker.

The casino project, originally announced in 2013, has encountered substantial legal challenges and delays. The Catawba tribe, based in Rock Hill, South Carolina, faced years of difficulty in acquiring the property in neighboring North Carolina for their casino. In 2020, the U.S. Department of the Interior reversed its previous decision and placed the 16-acre land into federal trust for the tribe, thereby permitting the Catawba to conduct gaming on the site. In 2022, construction of the permanent casino was halted after the National Indian Gaming Commission determined that the development contract between the tribe and project partner SkyBoat Gaming violated federal law. The contract granted SkyBoat, a non-tribal corporation, management authority over the casino operations, which is prohibited under the Indian Gaming Regulatory Act. In 2024, the tribe reached a settlement with SkyBoat to part ways, clearing the path for them to resume development of the casino.

The name of the casino pays tribute to the 18th century Catawba Chief King Hagler and to the city of Kings Mountain.

== History ==
=== Early gaming relations with North and South Carolina ===
The Catawba Indian Nation was not included in the Indian Gaming Regulatory Act (IGRA) as they were not a federally recognized tribe at the time of its signing in 1988. The Catawba gained that recognition five years later through the Catawba Indian Tribe of South Carolina Land Claims Settlement Act of 1993. Under this Settlement however, the Catawba agreed to not be governed by the IGRA, but instead allowed to operate games of chance permissible by the Agreement and State legislation, which included bingo and video poker at the time. The tribe opened several bingo halls but they struggled to be profitable and would eventually close down due to a high sales tax and competition with the South Carolina Education Lottery. The Catawba tried negotiating a compact with South Carolina to open a tribal casino in exchange for sharing casino profits, but former South Carolina Governor Nikki Haley and state officials repeatedly rejected the idea and were firm in denying any gambling expansion for the Catawba. Tribal leaders then began looking across the border into neighboring North Carolina for possible gaming ventures. In September 2013, the Nation announced “Project Schoolhouse”, which was the codename for a plan to build a $600 million casino resort in North Carolina. The tribe purchased a nearly 17-acre (6.9 ha) plot of land overlooking Interstate 85 in Kings Mountain, North Carolina, about 40 miles northwest of the Rock Hill, South Carolina reservation. The Catawba applied to the U.S. Department of the Interior to take this land into federal trust for the tribe in order to build the casino resort on the property in the bordering state. Former North Carolina Governor Pat McCrory and over 100 other state representatives disapproved of the plan and sent a letter to the Bureau of Indian Affairs strongly opposing the Catawba's application. The Eastern Band of Cherokee Indians (EBCI), who owned the only two casinos in North Carolina at the time, also came out in strong opposition against the project. The Catawba partnered with Sky Boat Gaming LLC, owned by politically connected South Carolina casino developer Wallace Cheves, to help the project get funding and approval. While local officials approved of the casino, some community members and churches openly object to the project citing religious concerns and fearing a negative economic and societal impact to the area. In 2018, after years of review, the Interior ultimately denied the trust land request. The Catawba subsequently filed a new discretionary application with the Interior as well as petitioned Congress, again requesting that it take the Kings Mountain site into trust and that the land be used for gaming. In 2019, South Carolina Senator Lindsey Graham introduced U.S. Senate Bill 790, which would allow the Catawba to take the land into trust for gaming. The bill receives support from North Carolina Senators Richard Burr and Thom Tillis. In March 2020, the Interior Department reversed its previous decision and puts the Kings Mountain land into trust for the Catawba.

The temporary casino opened on July 1, 2021 with 500 slot machines. The casino expanded in December 2021 to have a total of 954 slot machines while also adding 46 electronic table games which include Blackjack, Craps, and Roulette.

In September 2022, the casino added 30 kiosks which allowed players to place sports bets.

=== Federal investigation and political connections ===
In March 2022, the chief compliance officer of the National Indian Gaming Commission (NIGC) alerted the Catawba Nation to issues with their contract and that business agreements with partners violate the Indian Gaming Regulatory Act (IGRA). It warned that if they aren’t brought into compliance, the tribe could face fines and temporary closure of the casino. The NIGC's role is to ensure that Indian gaming is conducted in compliance with federal law and that the tribe's revenues are used in a manner that is consistent with the best interests of the tribe and its members.

On July 31, 2022, The Wall Street Journal published a report revealing that individuals with political connections in North Carolina and South Carolina received shares in companies connected to the casino while it was seeking approval to open. This brought concerns about potential conflicts of interest as it appeared politicians used their influence to benefit the casino and the companies they are connected to, rather than that of the public. Some of the political connections included Michael Haley, the husband of former governor of South Carolina and 2024 Republican Presidential candidate Nikki Haley as well as John Clyburn, the brother of South Carolina representative Jim Clyburn, both of whom were discovered to have ownership in the slot machine company, Kings Mountain Equipment Supply.

== See also ==
- Gambling in North Carolina
