= Leonard Broom =

American sociologist

- Born: Leonard Bloom; November 8, 1911; Boston, Massachusetts, U.S.
- Died: November 19, 2009 (aged 98); Santa Barbara, California, U.S.
- Other name: Leonard Bloom
- Education: Boston University, Duke University
- Spouse: Gretchan Cooke Broom
- Children: 2
- Awards: Fulbright Fellowship (1950), Guggenheim Fellowship (1958), visiting fellow in the Center for Advanced Study in the Behavioral Sciences at Stanford University (1962-3)
- Scientific career
- Fields: Sociology
- Workplaces: University of California-Los Angeles, University of Texas at Austin, Australian National University, University of California-Santa Barbara
- Thesis: The acculturation of the eastern Cherokee (1937)

Leonard Broom (November 8, 1911 – November 19, 2009) also known as Leonard Bloom, was an American sociologist whose career spanned seven decades. He was known for his research on discrimination and social inequality, which began with his studies on the effects of Japanese internment.

== Biography ==
Leonard Broom was born on November 8, 1911, in Boston, Massachusetts.

Broom was educated at Boston University (B.S. Phi Beta Kappa, 1933; A.M., 1934) and Duke University (Ph.D., 1937).

In 1941, he obtained a tenure-track appointment at the University of California-Los Angeles (UCLA), making him the second person to be named to the faculty of the department of sociology and anthropology there. From 1955 to 1957, he was the editor-in-chief of the American Sociological Review. In 1959, he left the faculty of UCLA to become a professor at the University of Texas-Austin (UT-Austin), where he helped establish the Population Research Center. He was the Ashbel Smith Professor of Sociology at UT-Austin from 1959 to 1971, and chair of the sociology department there from 1959 to 1966. In 1971, he became a professor of sociology at the Institute of Advanced Studies at The Australian National University, where he continued to teach until 1976. He was a research associate at the University of California-Santa Barbara from 1980 until his death.

He died on November 19, 2009, in Santa Barbara, California.

== Honors, awards, and recognition ==
Broom received a Fulbright Fellowship in 1950 to conduct research in Jamaica, and a Guggenheim Fellowship in 1958 for research in Australia. While on the faculty of UT-Austin, he received a one-year fellowship in the Center for Advanced Study in the Behavioral Sciences (1962–3). He was a fellow of the Academy of Social Sciences in Australia and the Royal Anthropological Institute, and received an honorary degree (DSc) from Boston University. In 2002, the Research School of Population Health at the Australian National University established the Leonard Broom endowment in his honor; it serves to give indigenous Australians the opportunity to pursue health-related careers. In 2011, the Leonard and Gretchan Broom Center for Demography was established at the University of California, Santa Barbara, with generous funding from Broom and his wife, Gretchan.

== Publications ==
- Bloom, Leonard (1937). The Acculturation of the Eastern Cherokee (thesis). Duke University. OL 37045232M.
- Speck, Frank G.; Broom, Leonard (1993). Cherokee Dance and Drama. The Civilization of the American Indian Series. Vol. 163. Will West Long (contributions). University of Oklahoma Press. ISBN 9780806125800. First published in 1951.
