= Walker Calhoun =

Eastern Band of Cherokee Indians medicine man, musician, dancer and teacher

Hewitt Walker Calhoun
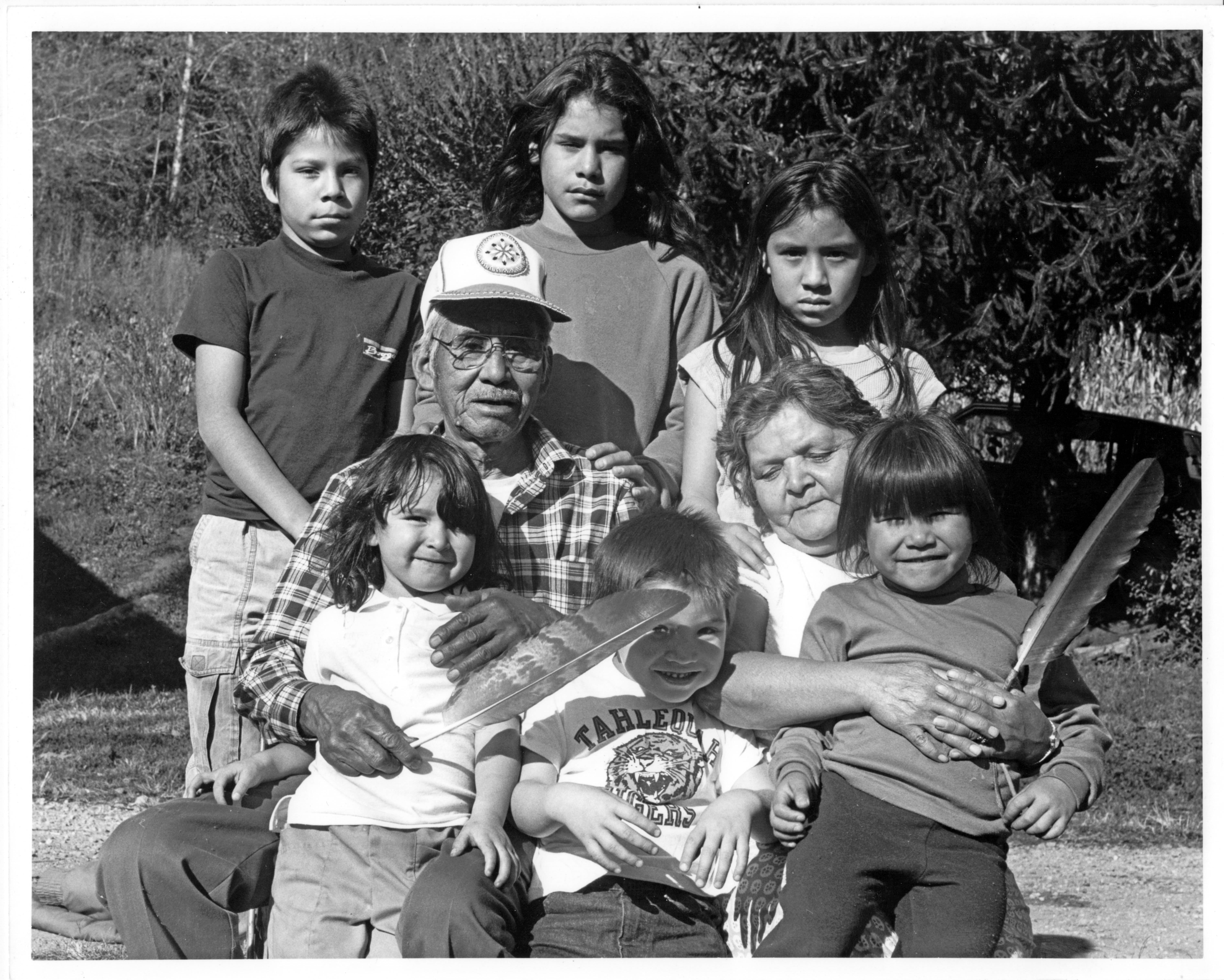
- Walker (center, in hat) and Evelyn Calhoun with grandchildren, 1989
- Born: May 13, 1918; Big Cove, North Carolina, U.S.
- Died: March 28, 2012 (aged 93)
- Citizenship: Eastern Band Cherokee, American
- Spouse: Evelyn Calhoun
- Relatives: Will West Long (paternal uncle)

Hewitt Walker Calhoun (May 13, 1918 – March 28, 2012) was an Eastern Band Cherokee musician, dancer, and teacher. He was a medicine man and spiritual leader who worked to preserve the history, religion, and herbal healing methods of his people. With these experiences, Calhoun became instrumental in the preservation of Cherokee traditions.

== Early life and education ==
Hewitt Walker Calhoun was born on May 13, 1918, in Big Cove, North Carolina. Calhoun was the youngest of 12 children born to Sally Ann Calhoun and Morgan Calhoun.

When Calhoun was nine, his father died; around the same time, he stopped going to school to work on the family farm. At the age of 12, Calhoun attended a boarding school in Cherokee, North Carolina, where he learned a little English. Before that time, he had rarely heard English because his mother did not speak it (this was customary in the Eastern Cherokee tribe).

Throughout his childhood, Calhoun learned Cherokee songs and dances from his Uncle Will West Long. He learned traditional medicine from his mother. Calhoun also taught himself how to play the banjo during these formative years.

== Career ==
During World War II, Calhoun was drafted into the U.S. Army. During the war, he served as a Combat Engineer in Germany. After the war, the army sent him to California. He married Evelyn Calhoun, and together they raised 10 children. Calhoun worked for the North Carolina Department of Highways. After which, "for about 20 years, I worked for a plant in Cherokee". At age 62, Calhoun retired.

In the 1980s, Calhoun founded the Raven Rock Dancers. Through this group, he began teaching the Cherokee youth the songs of his uncle Long. Some of these songs are listed below.

| Name | Dance | # of Songs |
| Friendship Dance | yes | 8-9 songs |
| Quale Hunters Dance | yes | 1 |
| Bear Dance | yes | 4 |
| Beaver Hunters Dance | yes | 4 |
| The Medicine song | no | 1 |

In the late 1980s, Calhoun recorded some of these songs at the "Cherokee museum". For this, he won several awards. The "Best folk recordings list" and a National Heritage Fellowship.

Calhoun was an active member of the eastern Cherokee community. Throughout his lifetime, he opposed the creation of casinos within the reservation, saying, "the young people think it will be our salvation. I think it will be our damnation". He also took part in some land reclamation involved with the Cowee mound.

== Death and legacy ==
Much of the Cherokee's songs and dances were lost, after years of the U.S. Government's, missionaries' and educators' attempts to suppress native tradition. Calhoun's knowledge of some of these practices has proven instrumental in retaining and reintroducing Cherokee traditions back into the Cherokee community. Calhoun makes his view of these traditions clear saying, "It was on the verge of going out of existence... Ima try and bring it back if I can." Calhoun was pivotal in reestablishing Cherokee identity through his Raven Rock years. He also made several records; hence some of his knowledge can be accessed even after his death.

Calhoun died on March 28, 2012, at the age of 94. Some of his recordings can be found at Berea College's Hutchins Library. He also made two albums of his songs titled Where Ravens Roost and Sacred Songs from Medicine Lake.

== Awards and honors ==
- 1988 - Sequoyah Award, awarded to the person who has done the most to preserve and teach Cherokee culture; Calhoun was the first recipient of this award
- 1990 - North Carolina Folk Heritage Award
- 1992 - National Heritage Fellowship from the National Endowment for the Arts
