= Gilbert Blue =

Chief of the Catawba Nation

Chief of the Catawba Nation
- In office 1973–2007
- Preceded by: Albert Sanders
- Succeeded by: Buck George (acting)

Personal details
- Born: December 5, 1933
- Died: June 11, 2016 (aged 82) Rock Hill, South Carolina, U.S.
- Cause of death: Mesothelioma
- Spouse: Elizabeth Sharpe
- Occupation: Politician
- Known for: Federal rerecognition of the Catawba Nation

Military service
- Allegiance: United States
- Branch/service: United States Navy
- Years of service: 1951–1960

Gilbert Blue (December 5, 1933 – June 11, 2016) was a Native American chief of the Catawba Nation in the U.S. state of South Carolina from 1973 until 2007. He was a grandson of chief Samuel Taylor Blue. Blue was a member of the Church of Jesus Christ of Latter-day Saints. During his time as chief, the Catawba received federal recognition.

== Personal life ==
Blue died on June 11, 2016, of mesothelioma.

== See also ==
- Bertha George Harris
- Brooke Bauer
- General New River
- Nopkehee
- Samuel Taylor Blue
- Yanbabe Yalangway
