= Frank Speck =

American anthropologist (1881–1950)

- Born: Frank Gouldsmith Speck; November 8, 1881; Brooklyn, New York, U.S.
- Died: February 6, 1950 (aged 68)

Academic background
- Education: Columbia University (BA, MA); University of Pennsylvania (PhD)

Academic work
- Discipline: Anthropologist
- Institutions: University of Pennsylvania
- Main interests: Algonquian and Iroquoian peoples

Frank Gouldsmith Speck (November 8, 1881 – February 6, 1950) was an American anthropologist and professor at the University of Pennsylvania, specializing in the Algonquian and Iroquoian peoples among the Eastern Woodland Native Americans of the United States and First Nations peoples of eastern boreal Canada.

== Early life and education ==
Frank Gouldsmith Speck, son of Frank G. and Hattie Speck, was raised in urban settings (in Brooklyn, New York and Hackensack, New Jersey), with occasional summer family sojourns to rural Connecticut. He had two siblings: a sister, Gladys H. (8 years younger), and brother Reinhard S. (9 years younger). The Speck family was well-to-do, with live-in servants that included a German woman, Anna Muller, and a mixed Native American/African American woman, Gussie Giles from South Carolina. Around 1910, Frank married Florence Insley, from Rockland, New York, and they raised three children: Frank S., Alberta R., and Virginia C. Speck. The family lived in Swarthmore, Pennsylvania, also keeping a summer home near Gloucester, Massachusetts.

As a young man, Frank developed an affinity for forests and swamps and wild landscapes, and for the Native people who lived in these locales. These interests inspired him to pursue anthropological studies. He was accepted into Columbia University in 1899. After working closely with professor and linguist John Dyneley Prince, who encouraged his interests in Native American language and culture, he was introduced to anthropologist Franz Boas.

Around 1900, during a summer camping trip to Fort Shantok, Connecticut, while on break from Columbia, Speck was surprised to encounter a group of Mohegan Indian young men about his own age. Burrill Fielding, Jerome Roscoe Skeesucks, and Edwin Fowler introduced him to about 80 other members of their tribe living in Uncasville, near Fort Shantok, in Mohegan, Connecticut. Speck took a particular interest in Fidelia Fielding, an elderly widow who (unlike most of her neighbors) still fluently spoke the Mohegan Pequot language. A 1975 source suggests that Speck was raised by Fidelia, but there is no evidence in Mohegan tribal records to support this notion. There is, however, no question that Speck's "interests in literature, natural history and Native American linguistics" were inspired by his early encounters with Mohegan people.

At Columbia University, Speck found his direction for life study as an anthropological ethnographer. He received his BA from Columbia in 1904, and proceeded to initiate fieldwork among the Yuchi Indians, receiving his M.A. in 1905. From 1905 to 1908, he continued his work on Yuchi data, receiving his Ph.D. from the University of Pennsylvania (1908), with his dissertation supervised by Boas. This ethnography focused on the Yuchi people of Oklahoma, among whom he worked in 1904, 1905, and 1908.

== Career ==
In 1907, the University of Pennsylvania (Penn) awarded Frank G. Speck a one-year George Lieb Harrison Fellowship as a research fellow at the University Museum (now the University of Pennsylvania Museum of Archaeology and Anthropology). Assistant Curator of Archaeology and Ethnology George Byron Gordon arranged for Speck to receive a dual appointment, as both Assistant in Ethnology at the University Museum, and Instructor of Anthropology for the university. Speck was assigned to teach the introductory course in Anthropology. The Harrison Fellowship was next held in 1908 by another of Boas's students, Edward Sapir, a specialist in linguistic anthropology.

Speck received a series of re-appointments in his dual position of Assistant in Ethnology/Instructor of Anthropology until 1912, when he was appointed as a full-time faculty member in the new Department of Anthropology. By 1913, after a contentious split with Penn Museum Director Gordon, Speck was appointed as chair of the department. He headed the department for four decades, stepping down only after his health failed in 1949.

=== Salvage anthropology ===
Speck was unique among many anthropologists of his generation in choosing to study American Indians close to home, rather than people of more distant lands. The pressures of relocation, boarding schools, cultural assimilation, and economic marginalization had, however, caused many Native American people to lose traditional lands, material, and culture. Speck found that his work constituted, in effect, a "salvage operation" to try to capture ethnological material during a time of great stress for Indigenous people. He began his efforts among Native Americans in New England, and soon expanded to regions as far afield as Labrador and Ontario in Canada.

==== Encouragement of segregation ====
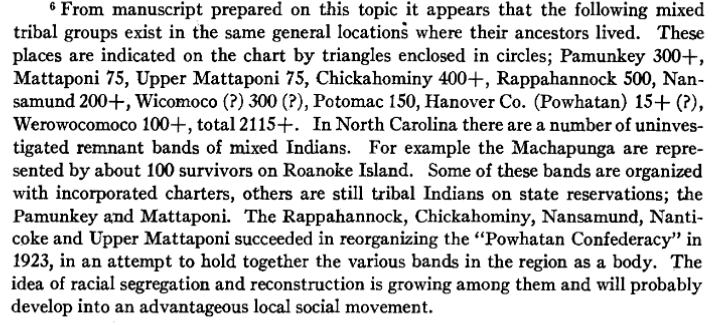
Frank Speck discussing Native Americans in Virginia.

Speck expressed the view that Native Americans in Virginia could be "salvaged" by establishing firm restrictions against intermarriage with Black Americans, and wrote as such in The Ethnic Position of the Southeastern Algonkian (1924). Historian Arica L. Coleman writes that Speck endorsed racial segregation among Native Americans in Virginia, reinventing Native American social tradition upon xenophobia and ethnocentrism. She says he prioritized a racialist Native American identity over a cultural one, in contrast to Native American scholars.

Speck asserted that the tribes had held aloof from African-Americans for a century. John Garland Pollard wrote that the Pamunkey frequently associated with African-Americans, which Coleman says challenges Speck's viewpoint. She goes on to write that Speck intentionally erased Afro-Indigenous peoples from Virginian history.

=== Students ===
Among his students at Penn, Speck nurtured a generation of prominent anthropologists, including: A. Irving Hallowell, Anthony F. C. Wallace, Arthur Huff Fauset, and Loren Eiseley, among many others. Speck also sponsored a few Native American students at Penn: his research assistant Gladys Tantaquidgeon and, for a brief time, Molly Spotted Elk. In 1924, Speck arranged to enroll Tantaquidgeon in Penn's College Courses for Teachers. Over time, their positions evolved from teacher/student to intellectual colleagues, and he encouraged her to take charge of independent research projects among Delaware, Wampanoag, and Mohegan peoples. Margaret Bruchac has examined the academic relationship between Frank Speck and Gladys Tantaquidgeon in her book called Savage Kin.

=== Fieldwork ===
Speck especially loved fieldwork and typically camped and traveled with the people he studied. During an era of extreme social stratification and white elitism, Speck did not hesitate to invite his Native informants to join him in his field research, to offer lectures in his classroom, and to stay in his home. Colleagues and students like Ernest Dodge, Carl Weslager, Loren Eisely, and Edmund Carpenter later recalled that Speck was extraordinarily accepting of, and seemed most comfortable among, Indians and other people of color. William Fenton recalled that Speck would often absent himself from academic functions when Native American informants came to visit him in Philadelphia.

During his fieldwork with the Iroquois, Speck became close to members of the Seneca Nation, who marked their relationship by giving him the name Gahehdagowa ('Great Porcupine') when he was adopted into the Turtle clan of the Seneca people. Such adoptions were a means of assigning a kinship position to outsiders who were welcome guests; they did not, however, constitute tribal membership. Speck was particularly interested in how family and kinship systems underlay tribal organizations and relations to homelands and natural resources. In Canada, he developed maps of individual family bands' hunting territories to document Algonquian land rights. These later became crucial to Native American land claims.

From the 1920s through the 1940s, Speck also studied the Cherokee in the Southeast United States and Oklahoma. Through the years, he worked extensively with tribal elder Will West Long of Big Cove, western North Carolina. Speck credited Long as co-author of his 1951 book Cherokee Dance and Drama, along with his colleague Leonard Bloom.

Speck assisted Red Thunder Cloud, an imposter who claimed to be a Catawba Indian. He insisted that Cloud knew the Catawba language, and gave him a letter of recommendation to visit the Catawba Reservation.

=== Organizational involvement ===
Speck was elected to numerous professional associations, where he took an active role on committees, including the American Association for the Advancement of Science, American Anthropological Association, American Ethnological Society, Geographical Society of Philadelphia, and Archaeological Society of North Carolina (honorary). He conducted work for the American Museum of Natural History in New York and the Smithsonian Institution in Washington, DC.

== Collections ==
Frank G. Speck collected thousands of Native American objects, along with many reels of audio recordings, reams of transcriptions, and photographs, which have been distributed into multiple museums, most notably the American Museum of Natural History, Museum of the American Indian (now the National Museum of the American Indian), Canadian Museum of Civilization (now History), Penn Museum and Peabody Essex Museum.

Speck's papers were collected and archived by the American Philosophical Society, of which he was a member. There are also collections of his papers at the Canadian Museum of History in Gatineau, Quebec and at the Phillips Library of the Peabody Essex Museum in Salem, Massachusetts.

== Works ==
- The Nanticoke and Conoy Indians with a review of linguistic material from manuscript and living sources (1927) Wilmington: The Historical Society of Delaware
- The Study of the Delaware Indian Big House Ceremony (1931) Harrisburg : Pennsylvania Historical Commission
- Naskapi: The Savage Hunters of the Labrador Peninsula (1935, reprint 1977) ISBN 0-8061-1418-5
- Penobscot man : the life history of a forest tribe in Maine, Philadelphia, University of Pennsylvania Press, 1940 (new edition 1997, 2015)
- Contacts between Iroquois Herbalism and Colonial Medicine (1941) ISBN 0-8466-4032-5
- The Tutelo Spirit Adoption Ceremony (1942) Harrisburg : Commonwealth of Pennsylvania, Dept. of Public Instruction, Pennsylvania Historical Commission.
- "Songs from the Iroquois Longhouse." (1942) Program notes for an album of American Indian music from the eastern woodlands, Washington, DC: Library of Congress.
- The Iroquois: A Study in Cultural Evolution (1945), Cranbrook Institute of Science ISBN 9780877370079
- The Roll Call of the Iroquois Chiefs (1950) ISBN 0-404-15536-7
- Symposium on Local Diversity in Iroquois Culture (1951) Washington, DC: US Government Printing Office.
- The Iroquois Eagle Dance: an Offshoot of the Calumet Dance (1953) ISBN 0-8156-2533-2
- The False Faces of the Iroquois (1987) ISBN 0-8061-2039-8
- Speck, Frank G.; Broom, Leonard (1993). Cherokee Dance and Drama. The Civilization of the American Indian Series. Vol. 163. Will West Long (contributions). University of Oklahoma Press. ISBN 9780806125800.
- The Little Water Medicine Society of the Senecas (2002) ISBN 0-8061-3447-X
- Midwinter Rites of the Cayuga Long House (1949)

== See also ==
- John Reed Swanton
- Helen C. Rountree
- Salvage ethnography

== Sources ==
- Smithsonian Institution Research Information System
