= Catawba people =

Federally recognized Indian Nation in South Carolina, United States

Catawba
Ye Iswąˀ
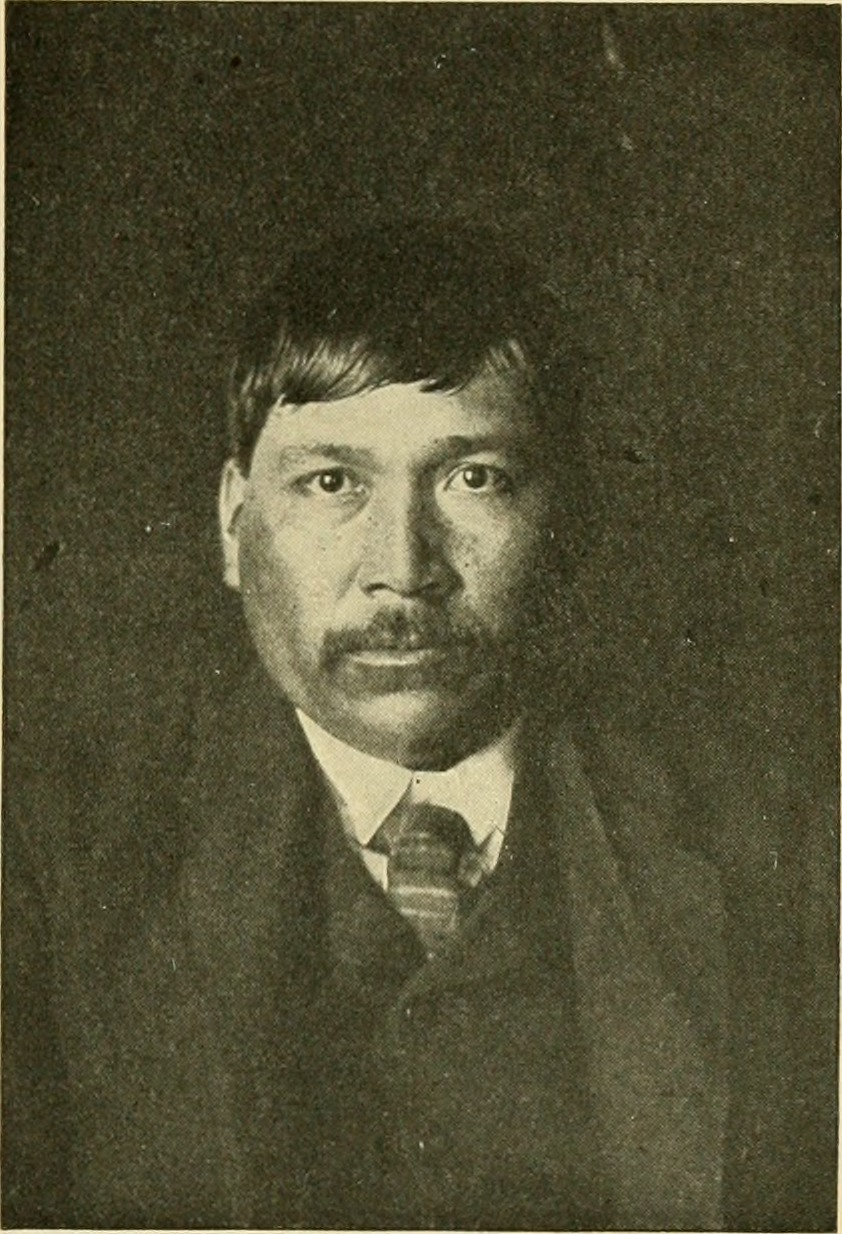
- A Catawba, 1901

Total population
- 2010: 3,370

Regions with significant populations
- United States (North Carolina, South Carolina)

Languages
- English, formerly Catawba

Religion
- Traditional Indigenous (private), Christianity (incl. syncretistic forms), Mormon

Related ethnic groups
- Cheraw, Woccon, Waccamaw, Sissipahaw, Eno, Shakori, and other Catawban-speaking peoples

Catawba Reservation
- Indian reservation
- Location in South Carolina
- Tribe: Catawba Nation
- Country: United States
- State: South Carolina
- County: York
- Headquarters: Rock Hill

Government
  - Chief: Brian Harris
  - Assistant Chief: Patricia Leach
  - Secretary: Roderick Beck

Population (2010)
  - Total: 3,370
- Website: catawba.com

The Catawba, also known as Issa, Essa, or Iswä but most commonly Iswa (Catawba: Ye Iswąˀ 'people of the river'), are a federally recognized tribe of Native Americans, known as the Catawba Indian Nation. Their current lands are in South Carolina, on the Catawba River, near the city of Rock Hill. Their territory once extended into North Carolina, as well, and they still have legal claim to some parcels of land in that state. They were once considered one of the most powerful Southeastern tribes in the Carolina Piedmont, as well as one of the most powerful tribes in the South as a whole, with other, smaller tribes merging into the Catawba as their post-contact numbers dwindled due to the effects of colonization on the region.

The Catawba were among the East Coast tribes who made selective alliances with some of the early European colonists, when these colonists agreed to help them in their ongoing conflicts with other tribes such as the Shawnee, Haudenosaunee, Lenape and Cherokee, who fought for control over the large Ohio Valley (including what is in present-day West Virginia). During the American Revolutionary War the Catawba supported the American colonists against the British. Decimated by colonial smallpox epidemics, warfare and cultural disruption, the Catawba declined markedly in number in the late eighteenth and nineteenth centuries. Some Catawba continued to live in their homelands in South Carolina, while others joined the Choctaw or Cherokee, at least temporarily.

Terminated as a tribe by the federal government in 1959, the Catawba Indian Nation had to reorganize to reassert their sovereignty and treaty rights. In 1973 they established their tribal enrollment and began the process of regaining federal recognition. In 1993 they regained federal recognition and won a $50 million Indian land claims settlement by the federal government and state of South Carolina. The state of South Carolina also recognized the tribe in 1993. Their headquarters are at Rock Hill, South Carolina.

As of 2006, the population of the Catawba Nation has increased to about 2,600, most in South Carolina.

The Catawba language, part of the Catawban language family, is being revived.

== Name ==
The Catawba have also been known as Esaw, or Issa (Catawba iswä, "river"), named after their territory along the principal waterway of the region. Historically, Iswa, today the river is commonly known as the Catawba River from its headwaters in North Carolina and into South Carolina before continuing as the Wateree River in Fairfield county, South Carolina. The nations of the Haudenosaunee frequently referred to the Catawba under the general term Totiri, or Toderichroone, also known as Tutelo.

== History ==
People have lived in the area since the Paleoindian period (~10,000 B.C.). Pottery along the Catawba river corridor have been found that date to the Woodland period. The Catawba were the people who inhabited the area when Europeans first began to settle.

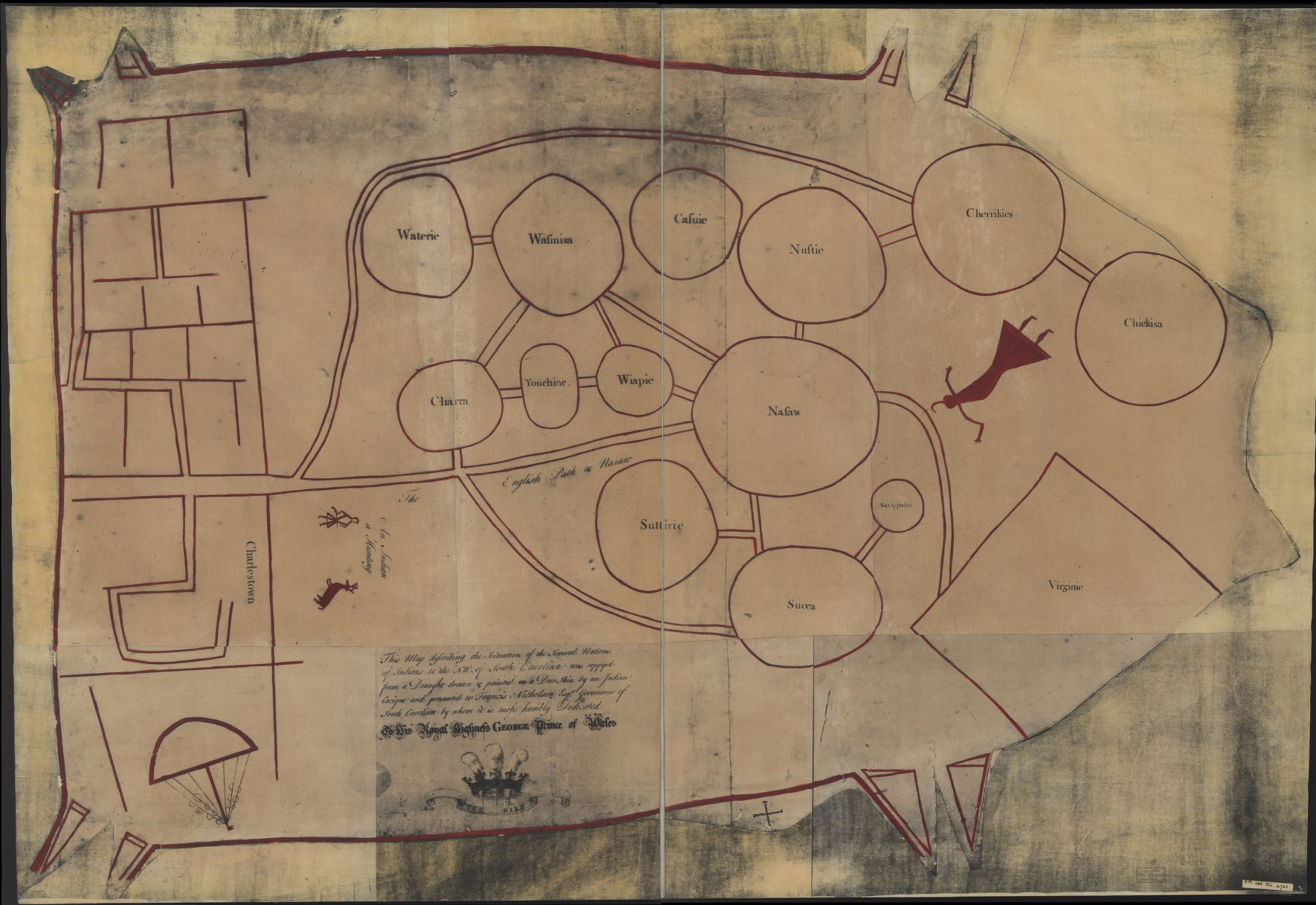
A c. 1724 annotated copy of a deerskin Catawba map of the tribes between Charleston (left) and Virginia (right) following the displacements of a century of disease and enslavement and the 1715–1717 Yamasee War. The Catawba are labelled as "Nasaw".

In the late 19th century, the ethnographer Henry Rowe Schoolcraft theorized that the Catawba had lived in Canada until driven out by the Haudenosaunee (supposedly with French help) and that they had migrated to Kentucky and to Botetourt County, Virginia. He asserted that by 1660 they had migrated south to the Catawba River, competing in this territory with the Cherokee, a Southern Iroquoian language–speaking tribe who were based west of the French Broad River in southwestern North Carolina, southeastern Tennessee, northwestern South Carolina, and northeastern Georgia.

However, early 20th-century anthropologist James Mooney later dismissed most elements of Schoolcraft's account as "absurd, the invention and surmise of the would-be historian who records the tradition." He pointed out that, aside from the French never having been known to help the Haudenosaunee, the Catawba had been recorded by 1567 by the Spanish expedition under Juan Pardo as being in the same area of the Catawba River as was known to be their later territory. Mooney accepted the tradition that, following a protracted struggle, the Catawba and Cherokee had settled on the Broad River as their mutual boundary.

=== 18th century ===
The Catawba also had armed confrontations with several northern tribes, particularly the Haudenosaunee Seneca nation, and the Algonquian-speaking Lenape, with whom they competed for hunting resources and territory. The Catawba chased Lenape raiding parties back to the north in the 1720s and 1730s, going across the Potomac River. At one point, a party of Catawba is said to have followed a party of Lenape who attacked them, and to have overtaken them near Leesburg, Virginia. There they fought a pitched battle.

Similar encounters in these longstanding conflicts were reported to have occurred at present-day Franklin, West Virginia (1725), Hanging Rocks and the mouth of the Potomac South Branch in West Virginia, and near the mouths of Antietam Creek (1736) and Conococheague Creek in Maryland. Mooney asserted that the name of Catawba Creek in Botetourt came from an encounter in these battles with the northern tribes, not from the Catawba having lived there.

In 1721 the colonial governments of Virginia and New York held a council at Albany, New York, attended by delegates from the Six Nations (Haudenosaunee) and the Catawba. The colonists asked for peace between the Confederacy and the Catawba. The Six Nations reserved the land west of the Blue Ridge Mountains for themselves, including the Indian Road or Great Warriors' Path (later called the Great Wagon Road) through the Pennsylvania, Virginia, North Carolina and Georgia backcountry. This path was frequently traveled and was used until 1744 by Seneca war parties to pass through the Shenandoah Valley to raid in the South.

In 1738, a smallpox epidemic broke out in South Carolina. Endemic for centuries among Europeans, the infectious disease had been carried by them to North America, where it caused many deaths. The Catawba and other tribes, such as the Sissipahaw, suffered high mortality in these epidemics. In 1759, a smallpox epidemic killed nearly half the Catawba.

In 1744 the Treaty of Lancaster, made at Lancaster, Pennsylvania, renewed the Covenant Chain between the Haudenosaunee and the colonists. The governments had not been able to prevent settlers going into Haudenosaunee territory, but the governor of Virginia offered the tribe payment for their land claim. The peace was probably final for the Haudenosaunee, who had established the Ohio Valley as their preferred hunting ground by right of conquest and pushed other tribes out of it.

Tribes located to the west continued warfare against the Catawba, who were so reduced that they could raise little resistance. In 1763, a small party of Algonquian Shawnee killed the noted Catawba chief, King Hagler, near his own village.

In 1763, the colonial government of South Carolina confirmed a reservation for the Catawba of 225 square miles (580 km^{2}; 144,000 acres), on both sides of the Catawba River, within the present York and Lancaster counties. When British troops approached during the American Revolutionary War in 1780, the Catawba withdrew temporarily into Virginia. They returned after the Battle of Guilford Court House, and settled in two villages on the reservation. These were known as Newton, the principal village, and Turkey Head, on the opposite side of the Catawba/Wateree River.

=== 19th century ===
During the Antebellum period, the Catawba began to adopt chattel slavery of African Americans, emulating white settlers. While the number of Catawba slave owners was small due to the Catawba general population being small, the percentage of slave-owning Catawba was comparable to the percentage of slave-owning white Southerners.

In 1826, the Catawba leased nearly half their reservation to whites for a few thousand dollars of annuity; their dwindling number of members (as few as 110 by an 1896 estimate) depended on this money for survival.

In 1840, by the Treaty of Nation Ford with South Carolina, the Catawba sold to the state all but one square mile (2.6 km^{2}) of their 144,000 acres (225 sq mi; 580 km^{2}) reserved by the English Crown. They resided on the remaining square mile after the treaty. The treaty was invalid ab initio because the state did not have the right to make it, which was reserved for the federal government, and never gained Senate ratification. and did not get federal approval. About the same time, a number of the Catawba, dissatisfied with their condition among the whites, removed to join the remaining eastern Cherokee, who were based in far Western North Carolina. But, finding their position among their former enemies equally unpleasant, all but one or two soon returned to South Carolina. The last survivor of the westward migration, an elderly Catawba woman, died among the Cherokee in 1889. A few Cherokee intermarried with the Catawba in the region.

At a later period some Catawba removed to the Choctaw Nation in Indian Territory and settled near present-day Scullyville, Oklahoma. They assimilated with the Choctaw and did not retain separate tribal identity.

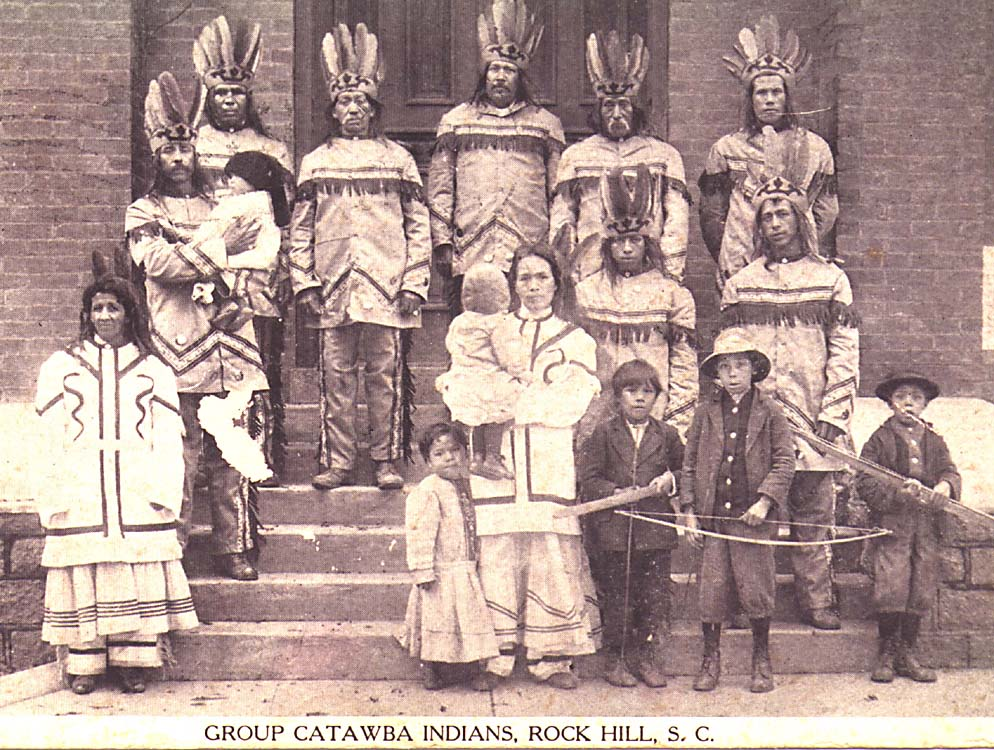
Catawba at The Corn Exposition 1913, Rock Hill, South Carolina

==== Civil War ====
The Catawba fought for the Confederacy in the American Civil War. Nineteen men enlisted with the Confederate Army and saw combat across Virginia.

=== Historical culture and estimated populations ===
The Catawba are historically sedentary agriculturists, who have also fished and hunted for game. Their customs have been, and are, similar to neighboring Native Americans in the Piedmont region. Traditional game has included deer, crops grown have included corn, and the women in particular are noted makers of pottery and baskets, arts which they still preserve. They are believed to have the oldest surviving tradition of pottery East of the Mississippi, and possibly the oldest (or one of the oldest) on the American continent.

Early Spanish explorers of the mid-16th century estimated the population of the Catawba as between 15,000 and 25,000 people. When the English first settled South Carolina about 1682, they estimated the Catawba at about 1,500 warriors, or about 4,600 people in total. Their decline was attributed to the mortality of infectious diseases. The English named the Catawba River and Catawba County after this indigenous people. By 1728, the Catawba had been reduced to about 400 warriors, or about 1400 persons in total. In 1738, they suffered from a smallpox epidemic, which also affected nearby tribes and the whites. In 1743, even after incorporating several small tribes, the Catawba numbered fewer than 400 warriors. In 1759, they again suffered from smallpox, and in 1761, had some 300 warriors, or about 1,000 people. By 1775 they had only 400 people in total; in 1780, they had 490; and, in 1784, only 250 were reported.

During the nineteenth century, their numbers continued to decline, to 450 in 1822, and a total of 110 people in 1826. As of 2006, their population had increased to about 2600.

==== Religion and culture ====
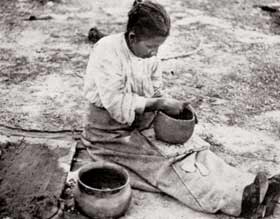
The Catawba women are well known in the Carolinas for their pottery.

The customs and beliefs of the early Catawba were documented by the anthropologist Frank Speck in the twentieth century. In the Carolinas, the Catawba became well known for their pottery, which historically was made primarily by the women. Since the late 20th century, some men also make pottery.

In approximately 1883, tribal members were contacted by missionaries of the Church of Jesus Christ of Latter-day Saints. Numerous Catawba were converted to the church. Some left the Southeast to resettle with clusters of Mormons in Utah, Colorado, and neighboring western states.

The Catawba on their reserve in South Carolina hold a yearly celebration called Yap Ye Iswa, which roughly translates to "Day of the People," or Day of the River People. Held at the Catawba Cultural Center, proceeds are used to fund the activities of the center.

=== 20th century to present ===
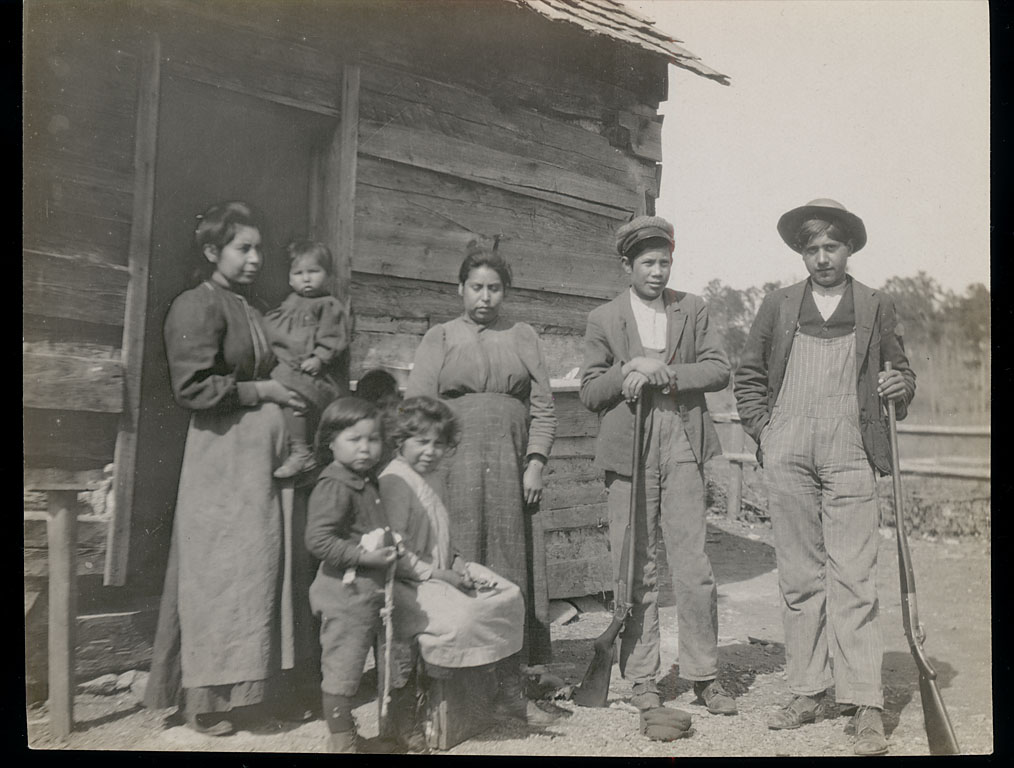
A Catawba family in 1908 South Carolina.

The Catawba were electing their chief prior to the start of the 20th century. In 1909 the Catawba sent a petition to the United States government seeking to be given United States citizenship.

During President Franklin D. Roosevelt's administration, the federal government worked to improve conditions for Native Americans. Under the Indian Reorganization Act of 1934, tribes were encouraged to renew their governments to exercise more self-determination. The Catawba were not at that time a recognized Native American tribe as they had lost their land and did not have a reservation. In 1929 Samuel Taylor Blue, chief of the Catawba, had begun the process to gain federal recognition.

The Catawba were federally recognized as a Native American tribe in 1941, and they created a written constitution in 1944. Also in 1944 South Carolina granted the Catawba and other Native American residents of the state citizenship, but did not grant them the franchise, or right to vote. Like African Americans since the turn of the 20th century, Native Americans were largely excluded from the franchise by discriminatory rules and practices associated with voter registration. They were prevented from voting until the late 1960s, after the federal Voting Rights Act of 1965 was passed. It provided for federal oversight and enforcement of people's constitutional right to vote.

In the 1950s, the federal government began to press what is known as the Indian termination policy, based on its perception that some tribes were assimilated enough not to need a special relationship with the government. It terminated the government of the Catawba in 1959. This cut off federal benefits, and communal property was allocated to individual households. The people became subject to state law. The Catawba decided that they preferred to be organized as a tribal community. Beginning in 1973, they applied to have their government federally recognized. Gilbert Blue served as their chief until 2007. They adopted a constitution in 1975 that was modeled on their 1944 version.

Catawba, Benjamin Harris.

In addition, for decades the Catawba pursued various land claims against the government for the losses due to the illegal treaty made by South Carolina in 1840 and the failure of the federal government to protect their interests. This culminated in South Carolina v. Catawba Indian Tribe, Inc., where the United States Supreme Court ruled that the tribe's land claims were subject to a statute of limitations which had not yet run out. In response, the Catawba prepared to file 60,000 lawsuits against individual landowners in York County to regain ownership of their land. On October 27, 1993, the U.S. Congress enacted the Catawba Indian Tribe of South Carolina Land Claims Settlement Act of 1993 (Settlement Act), which reversed the "termination", recognized the Catawba Indian Nation and, together with the state of South Carolina, settled the land claims for $50 million, to be applied toward economic development for the Nation.

On July 21, 2007, the Catawba held their first elections in more than 30 years. Of the five members of the former government, only two were reelected.

In the 2010 census, 3,370 people identified as having Catawba ancestry.

There are no longer any "full-blood Catawba", with the last reported "full-blood" being Hester Louisa. Due to intermarriages with whites being common, most Catawba citizens have both Catawba and European ancestry and many may outwardly appear white. As of 1911, Charles Davis of the Bureau of Indian Affairs had reported that most Catawba people were "full-bloods" few of whom had intermarried with white people and almost none of whom had intermarried with Black people. During the early 20th century, Catawba people sometimes appear as "Black" on census records as there were categories for white and Black but not for Native American, however, the Catawba did not view themselves as either white or Black.

== Catawba Indian Nation Land Trust ==
The Catawba Reservation (34°54′17″N 80°53′01″W) is located in two disjointed sections in York County, South Carolina, east of Rock Hill. Covering a total of 1,012 acres (410 ha), it reported a 2010 census population of 841 inhabitants. It also has a congressionally established service area in North Carolina, covering Mecklenburg, Cabarrus, Gaston, Union, Cleveland, and Rutherford counties. The Catawba also own a 16.57-acre (6.71 ha) site in Kings Mountain, North Carolina, which they will develop for a gaming casino and mixed-use entertainment complex.

Today the Catawba earn most of their revenue from Federal/State funds.

=== Gaming relations with South Carolina ===
Under the terms of the 1993 Settlement Act, the Catawba waived its right to be governed by the Indian Gaming Regulatory Act. Instead, the Catawba agreed to be governed by the terms of the Settlement Agreement and the State Act as pertains to games of chance; which at the time allowed for video poker and bingo. In 1996, the Catawba formed a joint venture partnership with D.T. Collier of SPM Resorts, Inc. of Myrtle Beach, to manage their bingo and casino operations. That partnership, New River Management and Development Company, LLC (of which the Catawba were the majority owner) operated the Catawba's bingo parlor in Rock Hill. In 1999, the South Carolina General Assembly passed a statewide ban on the possession and operation of video poker devices.

When in 2004 the Catawba entered into an exclusive management contract with SPM Resorts, Inc., to manage all new bingo facilities, some tribal citizens were critical. The new contract was signed by the former governing body immediately prior to new elections. In addition, the contract was never brought before the General Council (the full tribal membership) as required by their existing constitution. After the state established the South Carolina Education Lottery in 2002, the tribe lost gambling revenue and decided to shut down the Rock Hill bingo operation. They sold the facility in 2007.

In 2006, the bingo parlor, located at the former Rock Hill Mall on Cherry Road, was closed. The Catawba filed suit against the state of South Carolina for the right to operate video poker and similar "electronic play" devices on their reservation. They prevailed in the lower courts, but the state appealed the ruling to the South Carolina Supreme Court. The state Supreme Court overturned the lower court ruling. The tribe appealed that ruling to the United States Supreme Court, but in 2007 the court declined to hear the appeal, leaving the state supreme court ruling in place. In 2014, the Supreme Court of South Carolina ruled similarly against the tribe in regards of the state's Gambling Cruise Act.

In 2014, the Catawba made a second attempt to operate a bingo parlor, opening one at what was formerly a BI-LO, on Cherry Road in Rock Hill. It closed in 2017, unable to turn a profit.

=== Gaming relations with North Carolina ===
On September 9, 2013, the Catawba announced plans to build a $600 million casino along Interstate 85 in Kings Mountain, North Carolina. Cleveland County officials quickly endorsed the plans. But Governor Pat McCrory, over 100 North Carolina General Assembly members and the Eastern Band of Cherokee Indians (EBCI) opposed it.

The Catawba submitted the required acquisition application to the United States Department of the Interior (DOI) in August 2013, seeking to have the US place this property of 16.57-acre (6.71 ha) in trust, but their application was denied in March 2018. In September, the Catawba submitted a new application under the discretionary process; they also pursued a Congressional route. Senate bill 790, introduced by South Carolina Senator Lindsey Graham, with support of North Carolina senators Thom Tillis and Richard Burr, would have authorized the DOI to take the land into trust for gaming, but the bill died in committee.

On March 13, 2020, the DOI announced its decision to approve the 2018 discretionary application and place the land in North Carolina in trust. On March 17, the EBCI filed a federal suit challenging the DOI decision in the U.S. District Court in the District of Columbia. As is customary, the suit names the DOI, the United States Bureau of Indian Affairs, Secretary David Bernhardt, and several other department officials. In addition, the Catawba filed a motion to intervene to join the defendants. The Cherokee Nation of Oklahoma filed a motion to support the EBCI; both motions were approved.

In May 2020, the EBCI filed an amended complaint in its federal lawsuit, saying that the DOI's approval of the trust land resulted from a scheme by casino developer Wallace Cheves. He was said to have persuaded the Catawba to lend their name to the scheme, and had a history of criminal and civil enforcement actions against him and his companies for illegal gambling. It said that the DOI disregarded early consultation with the EBCI and skipped an Environmental Impact Assessment. The Cherokee Nation of Oklahoma also filed an amended complaint, seeking to protect cultural artifacts on their ancestral land where the casino is planned.

On January 24, 2021, Governor Roy Cooper signed a revenue-sharing compact with the Catawba Nation, which allows for Class III gaming and wagering on sports and horse racing; the compact is similar to the one signed between the state and the EBCI. On March 19, a letter from Darryl LaCounte, Acting Director of the Bureau of Indian Affairs, notified the Catawba Nation and Governor Roy Cooper that the agency has signed off on the agreement; it stated that the pact complies with the Indian Gaming Regulatory Act and other provisions of federal law. On April 16, the Catawba Nation received a victory in federal court, as U.S. District Judge James Boasberg found no basis for the Cherokees' claims in the lawsuit. Catawba Two Kings Casino opened on July 1, 2021, with a temporary modular facility containing 500 slot machines in Kings Mountain.

== Citizenship ==
Citizens of the Catawba Nation must be of lineal descent from a tribal citizen listed on at least one of the three tribal rolls taken in 1943, 1961, and 2000. The tribe does not use blood quantum to determine citizenship.

Some Catawba people during the 1800s converted to Mormonism and moved to Colorado to establish Mormon settlements. The descendants of Catawba settlers in Western states are not eligible for citizenship in the Catawba Nation.

== See also ==
- Brooke Bauer
- Catawba in the American Civil War
- Catawba Trail
- Cheraw
- Cofitachequi
- Cusabo
- General New River
- Guale
- Hagler
- Keyauwee
- Muscogee
- Nation Ford Fish Weir
- Sewee
- Tuscarora
- Tutelo
- Waccamaw
- Winyah
- Yanabe Yalangway
- Yuchi
