= USS Canonicus =

Four ships of the United States Navy have been named Canonicus for Canonicus, a chief of the Narragansett Indians, who befriended Roger Williams, and presented him with a large tract of land for the Rhode Island colony.

- USS Canonicus (1863), a monitor in commission from 1864 to 1869 and from 1872 to 1877.
- USS Canonicus (ID-1696), a minelayer in commission from 1918 to 1919 which also served as a troop transport
- USS Canonicus (YT-187), a tug in service during World War II.
- Canonicus (ACM-12), a minelayer.

== See also ==
- Canonicus-class monitor, a class of nine ships built for the Union Navy during the American Civil War
