= Mascus =

Narragansett sachem (died 1620s)

Sachem of the Narragansett
- In office by about 1600 – 1620s Serving with Canonicus

Personal details
- Died: 1620s
- Children: Miantonomi; Yotaash; Pessicus; Cojonoquant
- Relatives: Canonicus (brother); Ninigret (nephew); Canonchet (grandson)

Mascus (died 1620s) was a sachem of the Narragansett people of southern New England who ruled together with his elder brother Canonicus in the decades before English colonists arrived. In those years the Narragansetts brought many of their neighbors, from Long Island to central Massachusetts, under their authority. He was the father of the sachems Miantonomi and Pessicus.

Little is recorded about Mascus, who died in the early 1620s. In 1643 the commissioners of the United Colonies recalled how peaceably he and Canonicus had governed the Narragansetts. The antiquarian Howard M. Chapin thought he may have been the leading partner in the joint rule, and that the Narragansetts' expansion of authority over neighboring peoples took place under his leadership.

== Family ==
Mascus was the youngest of four brothers. Canonicus was the eldest, and the names of the second and third brothers are not known. Roger Williams, who knew Canonicus and Miantonomi, also described Miantonomi's father, without naming him, as Canonicus's youngest brother. Narragansett tradition, as recorded in a genealogy of 1703 and by Thomas Hutchinson in 1764, made Canonicus and his brothers grandsons of the early sachem Tashtassuck. Chapin, drawing partly on the Mohegan sachem Uncas's account of his own ancestry, conjectured that more generations came between them, and that the brothers' father was a son of a Narragansett sachem named Weesoum and his wife Keshkechoo. A sister of Canonicus and Mascus married a sachem of the Niantics, and according to Chapin she was the mother of the Niantic sachem Ninigret.

Mascus had four sons: Miantonomi, Yotaash, Pessicus and Cojonoquant, whom Chapin also calls Tassaquanawit. (Note: The historian Samuel G. Drake had already named Mascus as Miantonomi's father in 1837. He gave Miantonomi's brothers as Otash, Mossup and Canjanaquond, taking the last two from a manuscript among the papers of a Dr. Trumbull.) Chapin's genealogical tables also show a daughter, who died before 1655. Yotaash fought in 1637, during the Pequot War, but is not mentioned after 1638. After Mascus's death his widow apparently married another of Canonicus's brothers. (Note: In February 1638 Roger Williams wrote of Miantonomi's "father-in-law", a brother of Canonicus who was then near death. The term could then mean a stepfather.)

Tashtassuck
Intermediate generations
Canonicus	A son	A son	Mascus	A daughter (married a Niantic sachem)
Miantonomi	Yotaash	Pessicus	Cojonoquant	A daughter	Ninigret

Mascus's family, simplified (Note: Based on Chapin's conjectural pedigree and genealogical tables. The generations between Tashtassuck and the four brothers are uncertain: older tradition makes the brothers Tashtassuck's grandsons, while Chapin placed the sachem Weesoum and his wife Keshkechoo and their son between them. The brothers and Mascus's sons are shown in birth order; the place of each daughter among her brothers is not known. Of Miantonomi's sons, only Canonchet is shown.)

== Joint rule ==
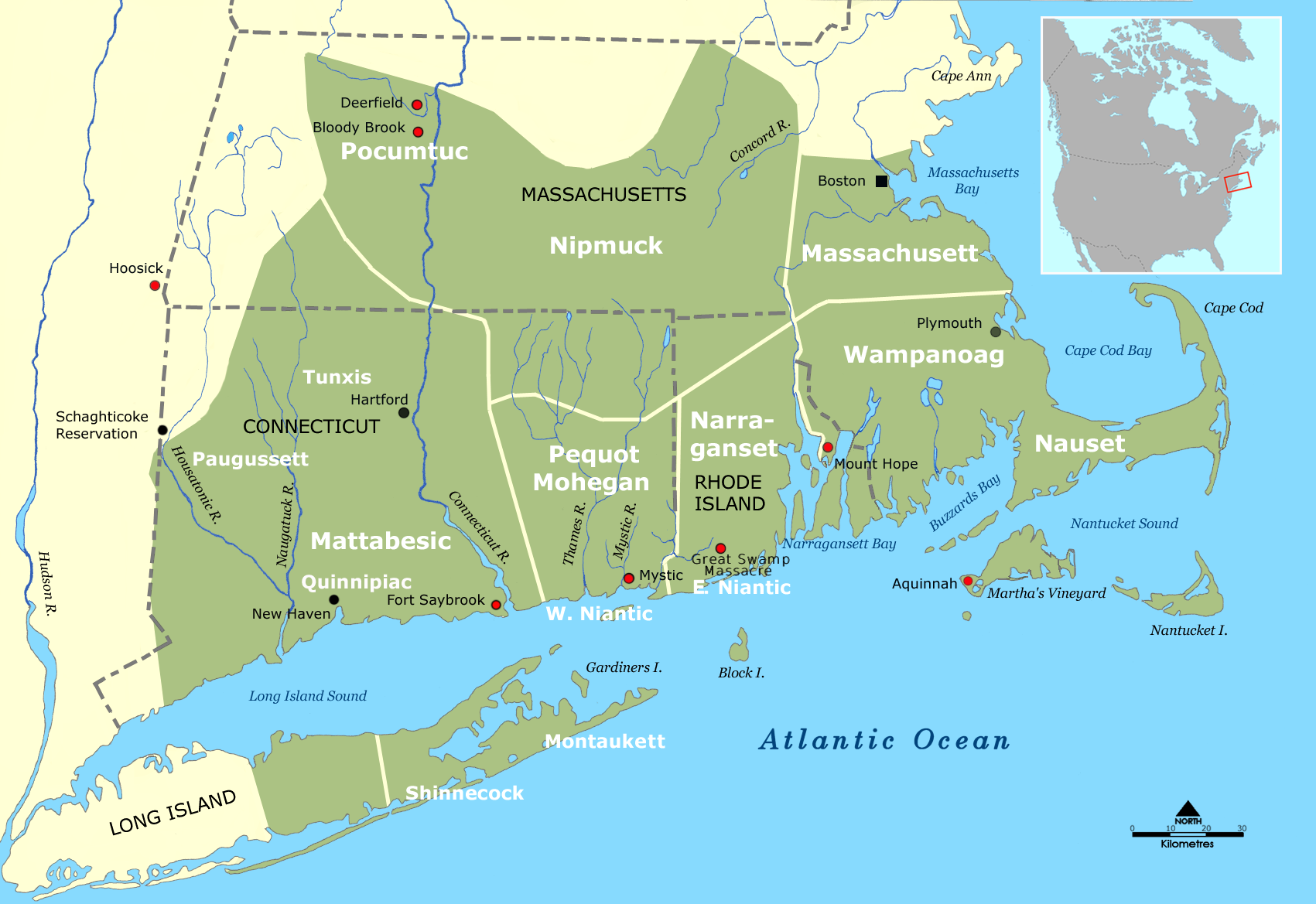
Approximate territories of the Native peoples of southern New England around 1600. Red dots mark later sites, including the Mystic and Great Swamp massacres.

Chapin thought that the two Narragansett chiefs named by the Dutch explorer Adriaen Block, Nathattow and Cachaquant, were "quite probably" Mascus and Canonicus. He concluded that the joint rule of Canonicus and Miantonomi had followed a similar arrangement between Canonicus and Mascus. The English knew of the earlier joint rule. At a meeting in Boston on September 7, 1643, the commissioners of the United Colonies, recalling "how peaceable Conanacus and Mascus, the late father of Myantenomo, governed that great people", in contrast to what they called Miantonomi's "rash and ambitious spirit".

By the time the English arrived, the Narragansetts had brought many neighboring peoples under their authority, among them the Niantics to the west, the Cowesets, Shawomets and Nipmucs to the north, the peoples of the bay islands to the east, and those on Block Island and the eastern end of Long Island. According to Chapin, the Massachusett sachem Chickatawbut, who lived near present-day Weymouth, was subject to Canonicus, and the Nipmucs of the Blackstone River valley, whose lands were said to reach as far north as Mount Wachusett in central Massachusetts, reluctantly accepted the authority of the Narragansett sachems.

Chapin thought this expansion probably took place under Mascus's leadership. In his view Canonicus and Miantonomi, in their "weak dealings" with the Wampanoags and the English at Plymouth, appeared "rather as inheritors of royal power, than as aggressive imperialistic potentates". In an address published by the Fall River Historical Society in 1927, R. F. Haffenreffer Jr. also credited the expansion to the "able and warlike" Mascus. Because Miantonomi, the son of the younger brother, was regarded as the real head of the tribe after 1638 rather than the aged Canonicus, Chapin suggested that Mascus may likewise have been "the real power" in the earlier joint rule. He also thought that the English would hardly have known Mascus's name unless he had been "the dominant force that rounded out the Narragansett empire".

== Death and succession ==
The historian Glenn W. LaFantasie places his death before the arrival of the English in 1621. Chapin likewise thought he had died before 1621, since the Plymouth colonists' first dealings with the Narragansetts mention only Canonicus. Pessicus, however, was said to be about twenty in 1643 and had a younger brother, so Chapin allowed that Mascus may have lived until about 1623.

After Mascus's death Canonicus ruled alone until, by the early 1630s, he shared the leadership with Mascus's son Miantonomi. When Miantonomi was executed in 1643, the Narragansetts again chose Canonicus's partner "from the house of Mascus", Miantonomi's younger brother Pessicus.
