= Miantonomi Memorial Park =

Historical place in the United States

- U.S. National Register of Historic Places
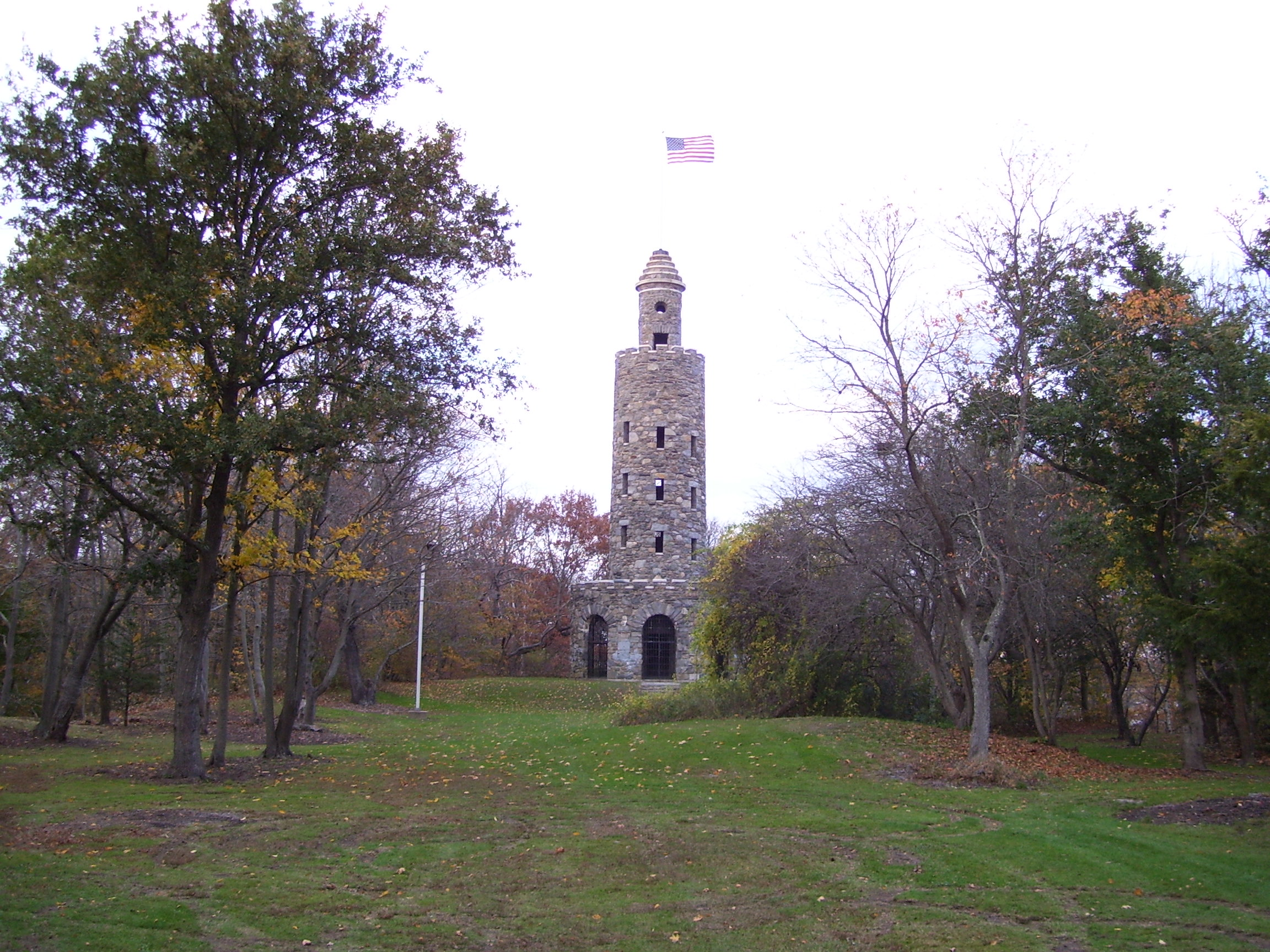
- World War I memorial tower on the hill at the park

- Location within Rhode Island Location within the United States
- Location: Newport, Rhode Island
- Coordinates: 41.5108°N 71.3102°W
- Area: 32 acres (13 ha)
- Built: 1637; 389 years ago
- Architect: William Mitchell Kendall; McKim, Mead & White
- NRHP reference No.: 69000003
- Added to NRHP: June 23, 1969

Miantonomi Memorial Park (MY-ann-toe-no-me) is a public park between Hillside Avenue and Girard Avenue in Newport, Rhode Island.

Indigenous people used the area around the park for hundreds of years and the park (and the hill it is on) is named after Narragansett Sachem, or Chief, Miantonomi. Aquidneck Island, where this is located, was sold to William Coddington "and friends" in 1637 by Miantonomi and his uncle Canonicus. The settlers used the hill as a lookout and in 1667 built a beacon on the hill. During the American Revolutionary War fortifications were built on the hill, fragments of which still survive. In 1921, the City of Newport received the property from the local Stokes family.

Miantonomi Memorial Park's 30 acres (120,000 m^{2}) became part of the Aquidneck Land Trust through an easement in 2005.

== Tower ==
The Park Commission built a stone tower in 1929 as a World War I memorial. On September 27, 2017, the Miantonomi Memorial Park Tower was named an official WWI Centennial memorial and will receive grant funds towards restoration and maintenance.

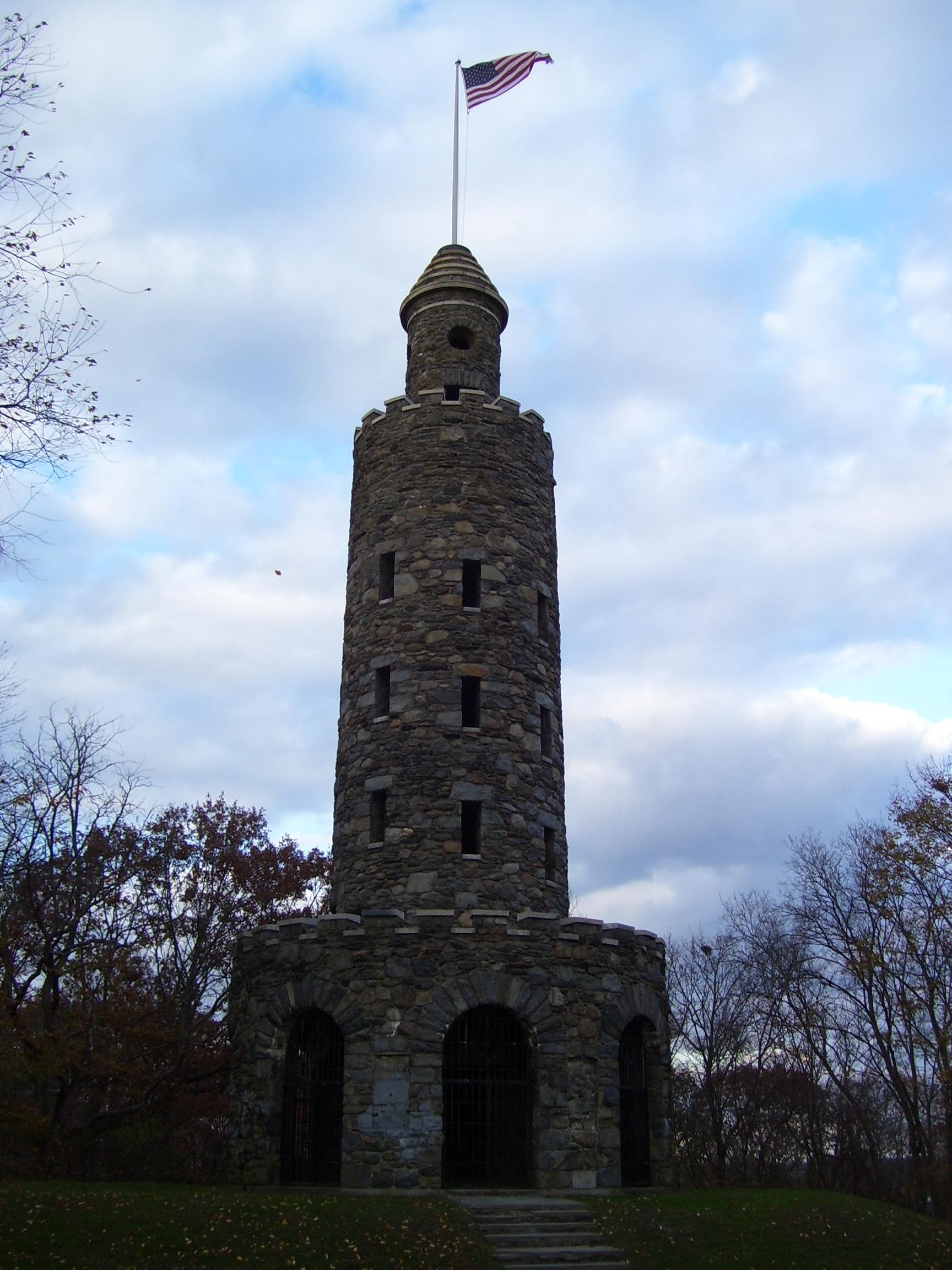
World War I memorial

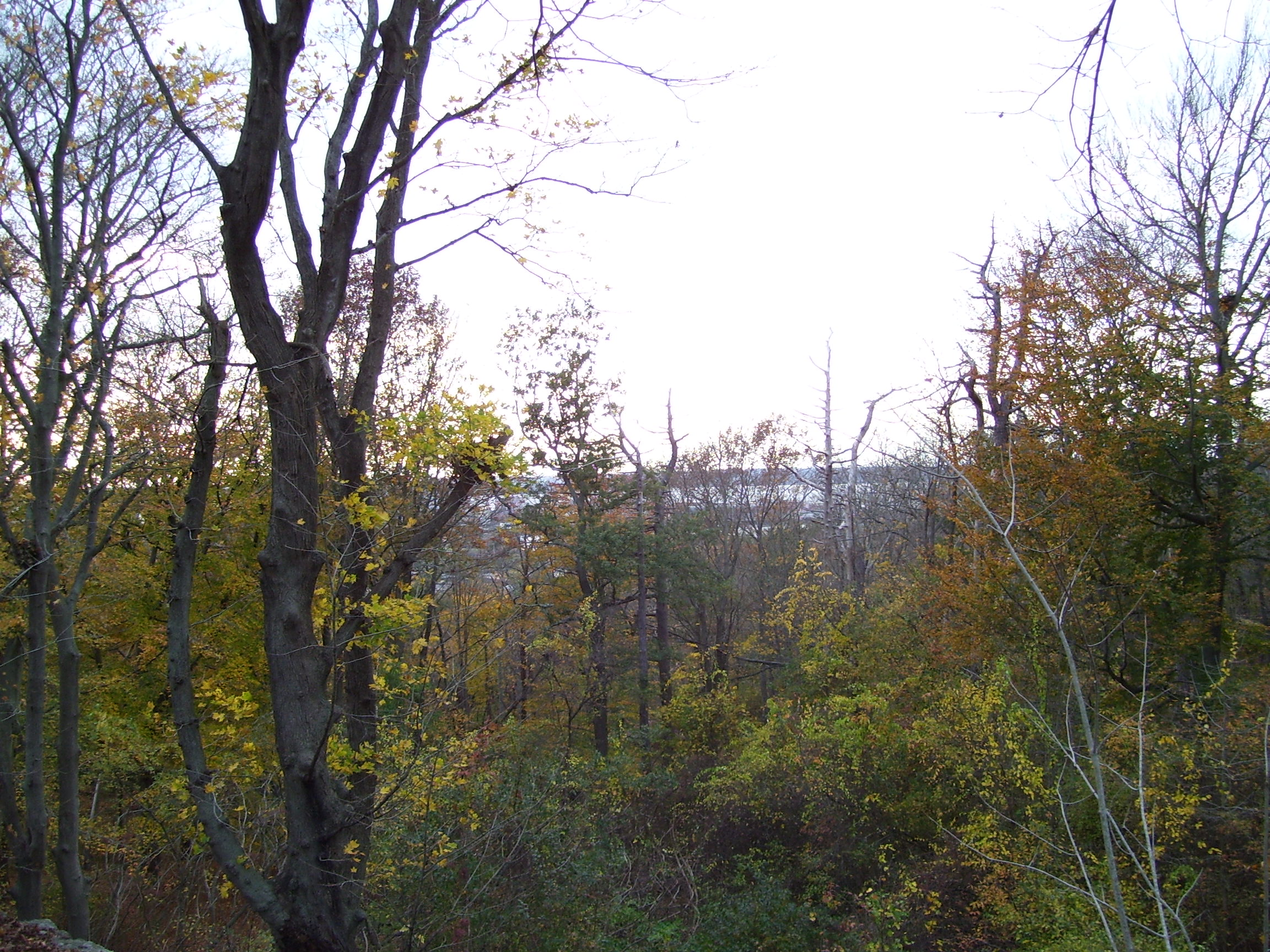
view of Narragansett Bay from the hill

== See also ==
- National Register of Historic Places listings in Newport County, Rhode Island
