= Canonicus (ACM-12) =

Auxiliary minelayer in the United States Nav

History

United States
- Name: Major General Erasmus Weaver (1942–1944); ACM-12 (1944–1955); Canonicus (ACM-12) (1955—); New Jersey (dates unknown)
- Builder: Marietta Manufacturing Company, Point Pleasant, West Virginia
- Laid down: as Maj.-Gen. Erasmus Weaver for the U.S. Army
- Launched: 1942
- Acquired: by the Navy, 1944
- Renamed: Canonicus, 1 May 1955
- Reclassified: MMA-12, 7 February 1955
- Identification: IMO number: 7436911
- Fate: Scrapped in 1993

General characteristics
- Class & type: Camanche-class minelayer
- Displacement: 1,320 long tons (1,341 t) full
- Length: 188 ft 2 in (57.35 m)
- Beam: 37 ft (11 m)
- Draft: 12 ft 6 in (3.81 m)
- Speed: 12.5 knots (23.2 km/h; 14.4 mph)
- Complement: 69 officers and enlisted
- Armament: 1 × 40 mm gun

Canonicus (ACM-12) was a Camanche-class auxiliary minelayer in the United States Navy. It was named for Canonicus, a chief of the Narragansett Indians.

Canonicus was originally delivered to the United States Army Coast Artillery Corps, Mine Planter Service in 1942 by Marietta Manufacturing Company of Point Pleasant, West Virginia. The ship was named USAMP Major General Erasmus Weaver for Erasmus M. Weaver, Jr., the first chief of the National Guard Bureau.

After serving in the Mine Planter Service of the U.S. Army Coast Artillery Corps, it was transferred to the Navy in 1944, classified ACM-12. ACM-12 was reclassified MMA-12, 7 February 1955 and assigned the name Canonicus on 1 May 1955. Canonicus was never commissioned and thus never bore the "United States Ship" (USS) prefix showing status as a commissioned ship of the U.S. Navy.

After being in reserve with the Navy the ship became a yacht, was converted to diesel, and became the Sandy Hook pilot boat New Jersey.
