= Miantonomi =

Narragansett sachem (died 1643)

Sachem of the Narragansett
- In office by 1632 – 1643 Serving with Canonicus
- Preceded by: Mascus (with Canonicus)
- Succeeded by: Pessicus (with Canonicus)

Personal details
- Born: Unknown
- Died: September 1643 Near Hartford, Connecticut Colony
- Cause of death: Execution
- Spouse: Wawaloam
- Children: Three sons, including Canonchet and Paupauquivwut
- Parent: Mascus (father)
- Relatives: Canonicus (uncle); Pessicus (brother); Ninigret (cousin)
- Other names: Mecumeh (earlier name)

Miantonomi (MY-an-toh-noh-mee; (Note: This is the modern Rhode Island pronunciation, as used for the park and street in Newport. It probably differs from the pronunciation of the Narragansett language.) died September 1643), also spelled Miantonomo, Miantonomoh or Miantonomah, (Note: English writers spelled the name in many ways. Roger Williams usually wrote Miantunnomu, with variants such as Miantunnom and Miantunomu; John Winthrop wrote Miantunnomoh or Miantonomoh; and the records of the United Colonies Myantenomo or Myantinomo. Myantonomy appears on the deed of Shawomet and in Wawaloam's deposition of 1661. Modern historians generally write Miantonomi, as does the standard edition of Williams's correspondence, or Miantonomo; Miantonomoh and Miantonomah are chiefly 19th-century forms, also used for ships of the United States Navy.) was a sachem of the Narragansett people of southern New England. From the early 1630s he shared the leadership of the Narragansetts with his uncle Canonicus. Canonicus directed the Narragansetts' internal affairs, while Miantonomi conducted their diplomacy with the English and other Native nations and directed their wars.

With Canonicus he granted land to Roger Williams in 1636 for the settlement of Providence, and in 1638 to other dissenters on Aquidneck Island. In 1637 he sent Narragansett warriors to join Massachusetts Bay and Connecticut in the war against the Pequots. In 1638 he and the Mohegan sachem Uncas signed the Treaty of Hartford, agreeing to bring their disputes to the English before taking up arms. He protested that the treaty made Uncas his equal, and by 1642 he was urging other Native peoples to unite against the colonists, warning that otherwise "we shall be all gone shortly".

In 1643, after fighting between Uncas and one of his allies, Miantonomi asked Massachusetts whether it would object to his retaliating. Told it would not intervene, he led the Narragansetts against the Mohegans but was defeated and captured near present-day Norwich, Connecticut. The commissioners of the newly formed United Colonies of New England ruled that he had broken the treaty and handed him back to Uncas to be killed. Several modern historians see the verdict as a political choice that removed the colonists' greatest Native rival while allowing Uncas to take the blame for his death.

== Background and early life ==
Miantonomi first appears in the written record in 1632, when John Winthrop, the governor of the Massachusetts Bay Colony, noted that he had earlier been called Mecumeh, and his documented life spans only the eleven years from then to his death in 1643. The archaeologist Patricia E. Rubertone estimates that he was between his mid-thirties and his forties during those years, which would place his birth in the late 1590s.

He was born into the leading Narragansett sachem lineage. According to Roger Williams, who knew Canonicus and Miantonomi well, his father, Mascus, was Canonicus's youngest brother. A genealogy recorded from Narragansett tradition in 1703 names Tashtassuck as Miantonomi's great-grandfather. In 1931 the antiquarian Howard M. Chapin put at least two more generations between them, and later historians disagree on how many there were. No source names Mascus's parents. (Note: The anthropologist William S. Simmons followed the 1703 genealogy; LaFantasie made Tashtassuck probably Miantonomi's great-great-grandfather; and Chapin's conjectural pedigree adds at least one more generation, based partly on Uncas's claim that his grandmother's father was a Narragansett sachem named Weesoum, whom Chapin linked to Tashtassuck only with a question mark.)

Tashtassuck
Intermediate generations
Canonicus (eldest son)	2nd son	3rd son	Mascus (youngest son)	A daughter
Mixanno	Miantonomi	Wawaloam	Yotaash	Pessicus	Cojonoquant	A daughter	Ninigret

Shaded boxes show Miantonomi's direct line; dashed lines show marriages and uncertain links. (Note: The chart follows the 1703 genealogy, known from a copy made by Ezra Stiles in 1762, with two exceptions. For Canonicus's brothers it follows Roger Williams, who knew the family, rather than the genealogy or Thomas Hutchinson's 1764 account, which differ on their number; and it follows Chapin, Fisher and Silverman in making Canonicus's sister Ninigret's mother rather than his grandmother. Mixanno and Ninigret's marriage to Miantonomi's sister come from the same two sources.)

Miantonomi was probably Mascus's eldest son; his brothers were Yotaash, Pessicus and Cojonoquant, in that order, and he had at least one sister. The Niantic sachem Ninigret was his first cousin and probably also his brother-in-law. (Note: Roger Williams called Ninigret's brother Wepitamock Miantonomi's "brother in law".)

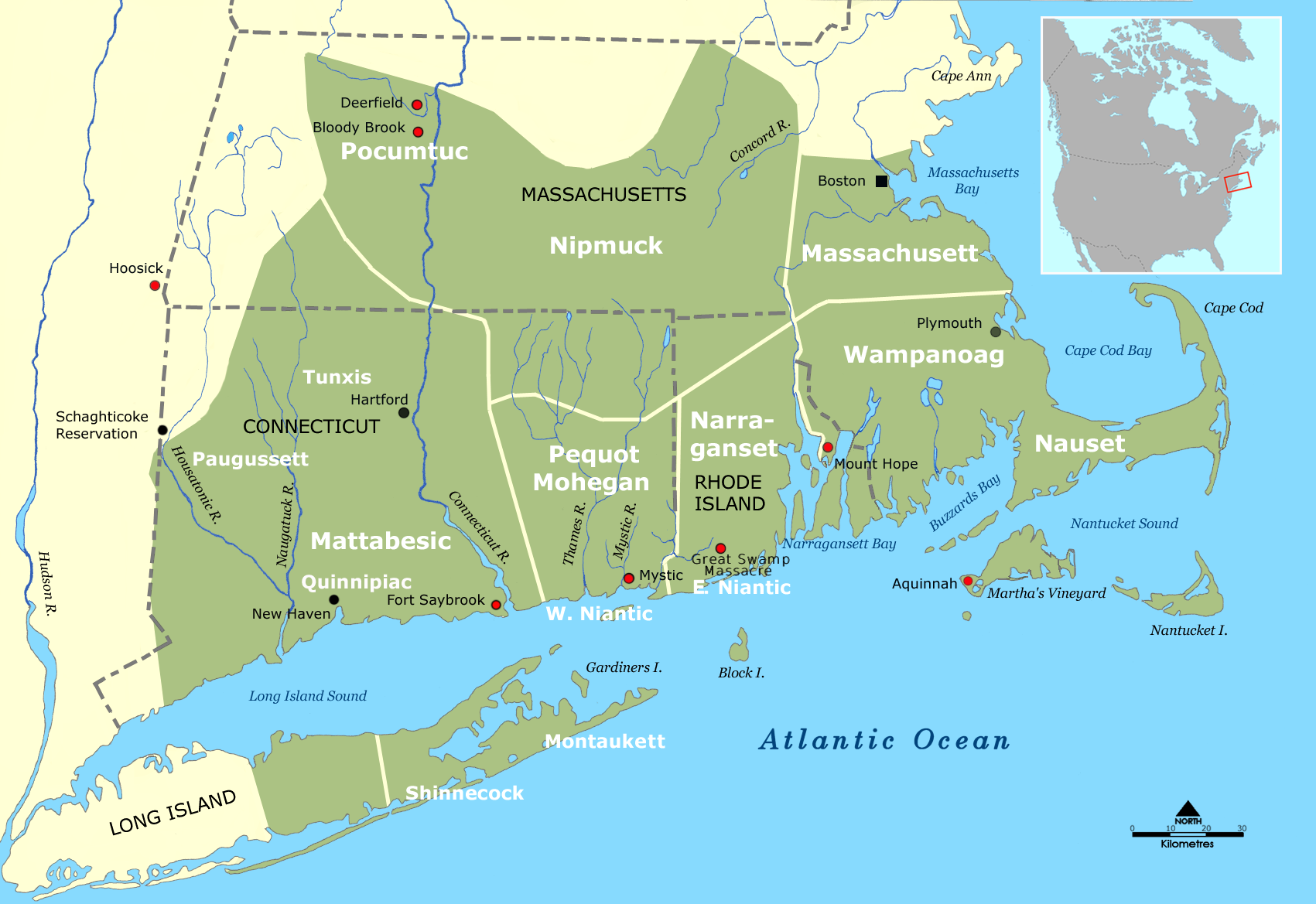
Approximate territories of the Native peoples of southern New England around 1600. Red dots mark later sites, including the Mystic and Great Swamp massacres.

In the early 17th century the Narragansetts, whose homeland lay on the southwest side of Narragansett Bay, became the dominant power in southern New England. Canonicus and Mascus ruled them jointly and led a network of allied communities around the bay and on Block Island; Chapin thought this expansion probably took place under Mascus's leadership.

Between 1616 and 1619 an epidemic killed as many as nine in ten people in some coastal communities to the east, but the Narragansetts escaped it. Survivors from other communities joined them, and they pressed the weakened Wampanoags to accept their leadership.

After Mascus died about 1620, Canonicus ruled alone for a time and raised his nephew Miantonomi. A 1644 act of submission to the English Crown, drafted by the colonist Samuel Gorton and signed by the Narragansett sachems, describes Canonicus as the "Protector of that late deceased Miantonomi, during the time of his nonage" (while he was a minor). (Note: In 1638 Roger Williams referred to Miantonomi's "Father in law, Caunounicus his brother", who was then gravely ill. The term could then mean a stepfather, and LaFantasie concludes that a brother of Canonicus had married Mascus's widow.)

== Sachem with Canonicus ==
Places in Miantonomi's life
1	Boston: visits, 1632–1642; treaty, 1636
2	Providence: granted to Roger Williams, 1636
3	Pequot fort, Mystic: Mystic massacre, 1637
4	Aquidneck Island: granted to William Coddington and others, 1638
5	Hartford: Treaty of Hartford, 1638; executed nearby, 1643
6	Shawomet (Warwick): sold to Samuel Gorton, 1643
7	Sachem's Plain, Norwich: captured after the battle on the Great Plain, 1643

By 1632 Miantonomi ruled the Narragansetts jointly with his uncle Canonicus. Their authority reached beyond their own people: neighboring peoples around Narragansett Bay, including the Cowesets, Shawomets and Pawtuxets and the Manisses of Block Island, followed the Narragansetts' lead in war, trade and diplomacy. English records call these peoples Narragansett "tributaries", but the Narragansett educator Lorén Spears has described the ties instead as "kinship relationships between communities". The Niantics, led by Miantonomi's cousin Ninigret, were partners of equal standing.

English writers described the two sachems as partners, with Canonicus as the senior. In 1632 John Winthrop called Miantonomi "the sachem, who was joined with Canonicus", and in 1643 Roger Williams, who knew both men, described how they shared power:

Their Government is Monarchicall, yet at present the chiefest government in the countrey is divided betweene a younger Sachim, Miantunnômu, and an elder Sachim, Caunoúnicus, of about fourscore [80] yeeres old, this young Mans uncle; and their agreement in the Government is remarkable. The old Sachim will not be offended at what the young Sachim doth; and the young Sachim will not doe what hee conceives will displease his Uncle.

— Roger Williams, A Key into the Language of America (1643)

The historians Julie A. Fisher and David J. Silverman see the arrangement as a division between peace and war leadership, reflecting Narragansett ideas of complementary pairs such as old and young. Canonicus generally oversaw affairs within the community, and Miantonomi enforced his decisions there: Williams called him Canonicus's "marshal, or executioner", the officer who carried out the punishments the elder sachem ordered. Beyond the community Miantonomi negotiated with the English and other Native nations and led the Narragansetts in war. By the time of the Pequot War he was the Narragansetts' principal diplomat, and the historian Glenn W. LaFantasie credits him with "a real talent for statecraft".

== Alliance with the English, 1632–1637 ==
=== Land grants to English settlers ===
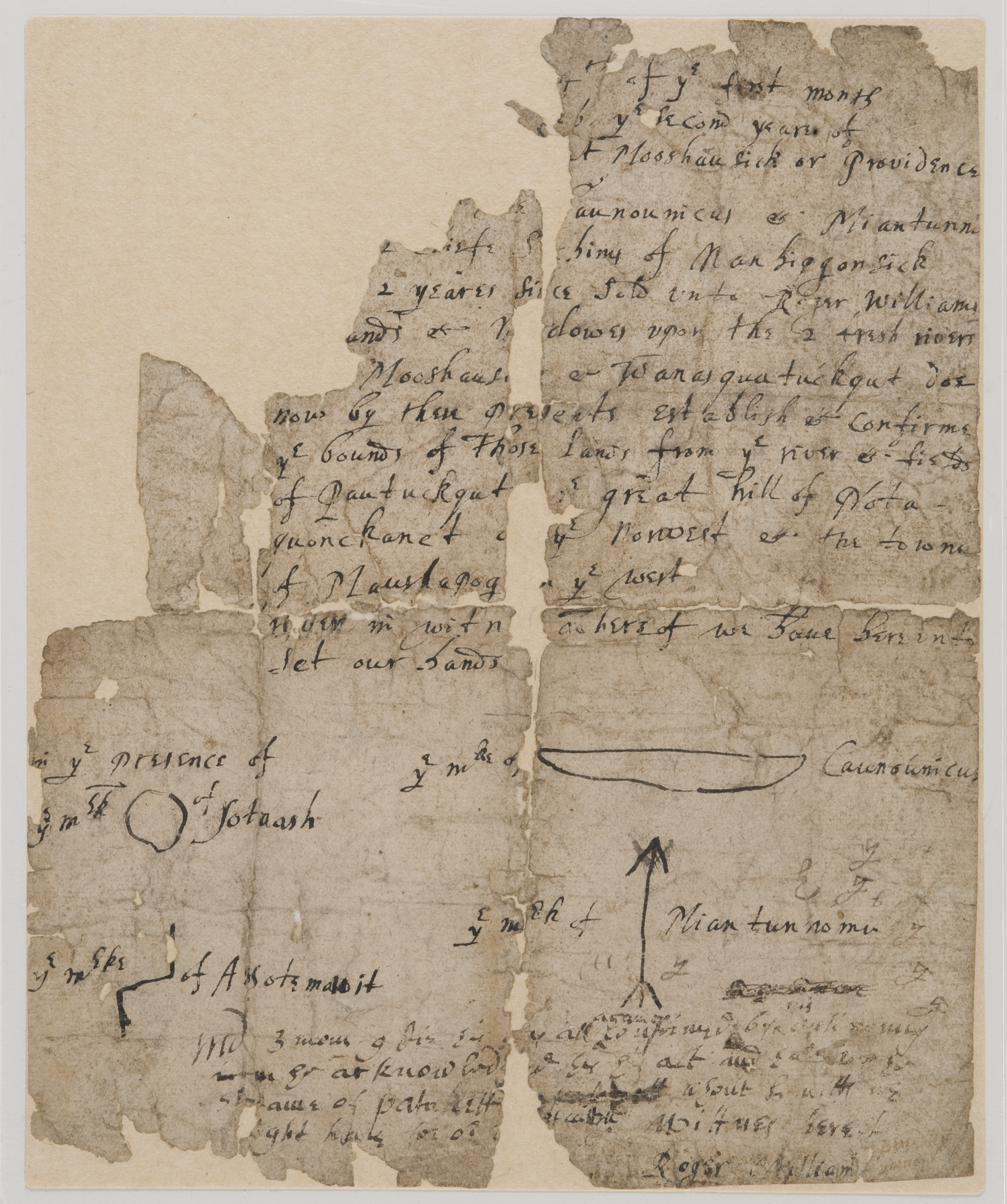
The Sachems' Deed of 1638, with the marks of Canonicus and Miantonomi

Miantonomi and Canonicus granted land to English settlers in what is now Rhode Island. In 1636 they allowed Roger Williams, banished from Massachusetts, to settle at the head of Narragansett Bay, where he founded Providence. Fisher and Silverman describe the grant as a gift "contingent on his ongoing friendship", and Williams in turn served the sachems as trader, interpreter and adviser. On March 24, 1638, the two sachems put their earlier spoken grant in writing, in a document now known as the Sachems' Deed. It fixed the bounds of the Providence lands and added the land south to the Pawtuxet River "in Consideration of the many Kindneses & services" Williams had done for them.

The same month they granted Aquidneck Island to William Coddington and other exiles from Massachusetts for forty fathoms of wampum. Miantonomi promised ten coats and twenty hoes to the Narragansetts living on the island, who were to leave before winter.

=== Early diplomacy ===
From his first recorded visit to Boston, in August 1632, Miantonomi worked to keep good relations with the English. He stayed two nights with his wife and about a dozen Narragansett men, attended a sermon and dined with Governor Winthrop. When three of his men broke into a colonist's house, Winthrop persuaded him, "with some difficulty", to have one of his own men beat the offenders and send them out of the town.

Trade brought the first serious test of those relations. In 1634 Canonicus and Miantonomi allowed the Massachusetts trader John Oldham to use an island in Narragansett Bay on condition that he live there, hoping to make him their exclusive trading partner. Oldham instead traded with the Pequots, the Narragansetts' principal rivals. In July 1636 Manissean men from Block Island, who followed Narragansett leadership, killed Oldham aboard his boat. A captive taken in the attack said the killing had been planned by the sachems of other Narragansett communities, Ninigret among them, but not by Canonicus or Miantonomi.

Canonicus and Miantonomi moved at once to distance themselves from the killing and preserve their relations with Massachusetts. Through Roger Williams they sent word that they were "grievously" offended, and Miantonomi led two hundred men against the Manisses on Block Island. Winthrop accepted that neither sachem had been involved in the plot. In 1637, in what LaFantasie calls "a display of loyalty toward the English", Miantonomi paid some Manisses men six fathoms of wampum to kill Audsah, an Eastern Niantic whom Williams identified as Oldham's "chiefe murtherer". (Note: Roger Williams valued a fathom of wampum at about five shillings, so the bounty came to roughly thirty shillings.)

=== Alliance against the Pequots, 1636 ===
Facing war with Massachusetts, the Pequots urged the Narragansetts to join them. The English, they warned, were "strangers" who "began to overspread the country", and by helping them the Narragansetts would be paving "the way for their own overthrow". Partly at Roger Williams's urging, the Narragansetts refused.

On October 21, 1636, at the governor's invitation, Miantonomi came to Boston with two of Canonicus's sons, another sachem and nearly twenty men to negotiate an alliance against the Pequots. The governor of Massachusetts, Henry Vane, had called together most of the magistrates and ministers to advise on the terms, and after dinner Miantonomi declared that the Narragansetts "had always loved the English, and desired firm peace". The next day he and Vane signed the treaty. The Narragansetts promised to make no separate peace with the Pequots, to hand over murderers and runaway servants, to provide guides, and to stay away from English settlements during the war unless escorted. Because the Massachusetts magistrates struggled to make the terms clear to them, a copy was sent to Williams to translate.

== Pequot War ==
In the spring of 1637, as Massachusetts and Connecticut prepared to attack the Pequots, Miantonomi and Canonicus sent Massachusetts detailed advice through Williams on how to conduct the war, including a request "that it would be pleasing to all natives, that women and children be spared". The military historian David Naumec has called it "a Narragansett battle plan". Miantonomi sent two hundred men with the Connecticut expedition under John Mason, though he did not go himself.

The war's decisive blow came on May 26, 1637, when the English attacked the Pequot fort near the Mystic River in present-day southeastern Connecticut, set it on fire and killed hundreds of people, most of them probably noncombatants, in what became known as the Mystic massacre. The Narragansetts protested that the English way of war "is too furious, and slays too many men", and soon left the expedition. The Narragansett educator Lorén Spears has called the massacre directed by Connecticut a "reality check" for the Native peoples of southern New England: "The way that we did warfare was not this full annihilation, this conquest mentality".

In the months of pursuit that followed, Miantonomi went on fighting the Pequots, but when some seventy Pequots sought his protection he deferred to Winthrop, saying he was "in league with Mr Governour", and asked that those who joined the Narragansetts be "used kindly, have howses and goods and fields given them". Taking in Pequot survivors helped the Narragansetts rebuild a population reduced by a smallpox epidemic in 1633.

The English–Narragansett alliance soon came under strain. The English accused the Narragansetts of keeping Pequot captives and refugees among themselves instead of handing them over, and the Massachusetts captain Israel Stoughton thought they fought not to help the English but only "to augment their owne Kingdome". When Williams put the colony's complaints to the sachems in August 1637, they replied that it was the English who had broken their promises. Miantonomi's brother, for example, had handed over a captured Pequot sachem, yet when Miantonomi asked to see the prisoner, English guards turned him away with their pikes. "Did ever friends deal so with friends?" he asked.

Williams told Winthrop that Miantonomi would be a true friend if convinced "that the English never intended to despoile him of the Countrey", but warned that among the English "the generall speech is, all must be rooted out". Miantonomi also objected to Connecticut treating the Mohegans, a much smaller people led by Uncas, as the equals of the Narragansetts: "These Mohiganeucks are but as a twig ... we are as a great tree".

== Treaty of Hartford ==
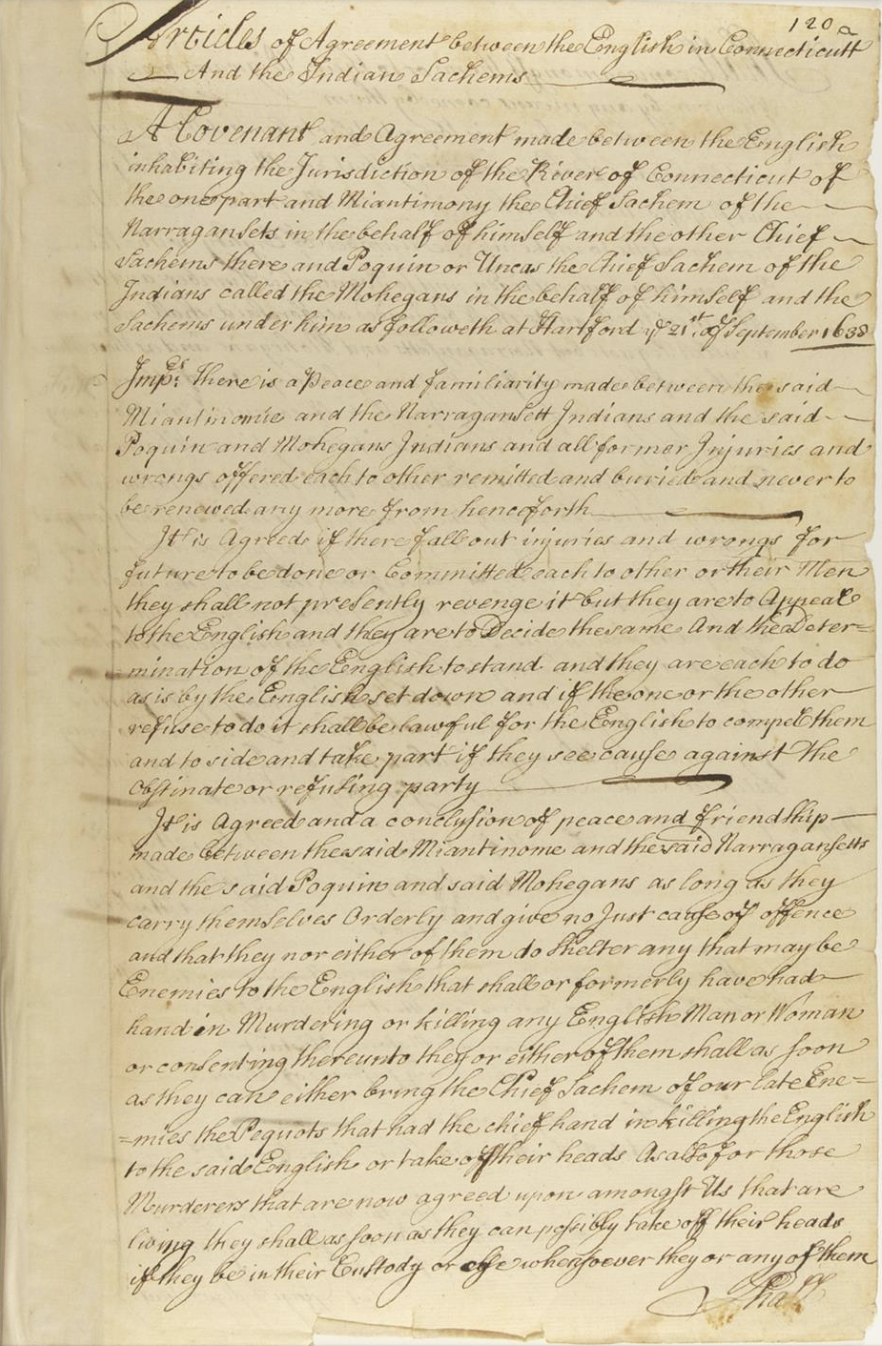
A 1743 copy of the Treaty of Hartford

By 1638 Mohegan accusations were turning Connecticut against Miantonomi. Mohegans reported that he planned to kill the interpreter Thomas Stanton; Williams investigated and found these rumors "slanders". Williams complained to Winthrop that the Connecticut leaders were "marveilously deluded by the Monahiggons" and "strangely bewitched with the subjection of these Pequots to themselves", and that they demanded Miantonomi come to Hartford in person to answer reports that he had made "proud Speeches". What he was supposed to have said is not recorded; historian Michael Leroy Oberg suggests that the Connecticut magistrates, eager to secure the former Pequot lands for their colony, suspected him of trying to take control of them.

In September 1638 Miantonomi traveled to Hartford with his wife, Wawaloam, their children, Williams, and an escort of more than 150 men. Word reached them that Pequots and Mohegans lay in wait on the path and had threatened "to boil him in the kettle"; the English with him advised turning back, but Miantonomi and his council resolved "that not a man should turn back, resolving rather all to die". At Hartford he twice invited Uncas to eat with him, and Uncas refused. On September 21, 1638, Miantonomi, Uncas and the Connecticut magistrates agreed to a treaty whose central clause bound the two sachems to settle their quarrels through the English:

If there fall out injuries and wrongs for future to be done or committed each to other or their men, they shall not presently revenge it. But they are to appeal to the English and they are to decide the same. And if the one or the other shall refuse to do, it shall be lawful for the English to compel him, and to side and take part if they see cause, against the obstinate or refusing party.

— Treaty of Hartford, 1638

The treaty divided the surviving Pequots among the sachems, eighty each to Miantonomi and Uncas and twenty to Ninigret, in return for an annual payment of wampum to Connecticut for each Pequot, and forbade the Narragansetts and Mohegans to occupy the former Pequot country without English permission. It aimed to end the Pequots' existence as a distinct people, and it put in writing the equality Miantonomi had protested, making Uncas, until recently a minor sachem, his equal before the English. LaFantasie notes that the final text appears to have included clauses "added without the immediate knowledge or consent of all of the parties involved".

Historians have read the treaty in different ways. Daragh Grant, a historian of early American law, treats it as an agreement among autonomous peoples that involved no Native submission to the English; Rubertone calls it "an unambiguous move by the colonists to establish control over Native affairs"; and Fisher and Silverman suggest that the Narragansetts understood it "less as a binding agreement than as a symbol of peace". The Narragansetts soon found that the hunting rights Williams had promised them in the Pequot country had not been granted. In May 1639 Canonicus and Miantonomi asked Winthrop to "ratifie that Promise made to them after the warrs", but there is no record that he did; in LaFantasie's judgment the two colonies "had no intention of granting any rights or privileges to the Narragansetts" in the Pequot country.

== Breakdown of the alliance, 1640–1643 ==
=== Mohawk rumor and Boston visit, 1640 ===
In September 1640 Governor William Bradford of Plymouth reported that Miantonomi had sent wampum to the Mohawks to win their help against the English. Massachusetts doubted the report but strengthened its watches and sent an officer to the Narragansetts to ask their intentions. The sachems denied conspiring with the Mohawks and professed their friendship, and Miantonomi agreed to come to Boston to answer for himself if Williams could come with him; Massachusetts, which had banished Williams, refused.

When Miantonomi came that November, he would not negotiate through the colony's Pequot interpreter, a servant whom the Narragansetts regarded as an enemy and feared would reveal their private conversations. Governor Thomas Dudley, thinking it "a dishonor to us to give so much way to them", refused to use another, and Miantonomi left without thanking him for his hospitality. The court then refused Miantonomi a place at the governor's table until he acknowledged this "failing". He did so, and talks went ahead through a Pequot woman who spoke English, but he told the magistrates that when English envoys came to the Narragansetts they "were permitted to use their own fashions, and so he expected the same liberty with us". The meeting produced nothing new: the articles of the 1636 treaty were read to him and he accepted them again, with an added clause making the Narragansetts liable for damage done by any hunting traps their men set in Massachusetts.

=== Speech to the Montauks, 1642 ===
By 1642 Miantonomi was seeking allies against the English beyond Narragansett country. In the spring, Dutch officials reported that he had passed through Native villages near New Amsterdam with a hundred men, "soliciting them to a general war against both the English and the Dutch". He also turned to the Montauketts of eastern Long Island, whose sachem, Wyandanch, was allied with the English. Narragansett envoys had already failed to persuade Wyandanch to stop paying tribute to the English, so Miantonomi followed them to Montauk himself and, in Wyandanch's absence, appealed to the Montauk elders. In the best-known statement of his call for Native unity, he argued that the English were destroying the land that fed them:

For So are we all Indeans as ye English are, and Say brother to one another, So must we be one as they are, otherwise we shall be all gone shortly, for you know our fathers had plentie of deare, & Skins, our plaines were full of deare as also our woods and of Turkeies, and our Coves full of fish and foule, but these English having gotten our land, they with Sithes cut downe ye grass, and with axes fell the trees their Cowes & horses eat ye grass and their hoggs spoyle our Clambanks, and we Shall all be starved.

— Miantonomi to the Montauk elders, 1642, as related by Lion Gardiner (1660)

He then urged the elders to join an attack on the English on an appointed day, signaled by "3 fires" lit "40 dayes hence in a cleare night", when they should "fall on and kill men women & children, but no Cowes, for they will serve to eate till our deare be Increased again". The elders reportedly agreed, but Wyandanch learned of the meeting and told Lion Gardiner, the English commander at Saybrook, who warned the governors of Connecticut and New Haven.

The speech survives only in Gardiner's account, written about eighteen years later from Wyandanch's report; Daragh Grant notes that both men were hostile to the Narragansetts. Fisher and Silverman nonetheless call it the fullest statement from its time and place of "colonialism's threats to indigenous people", while noting that the Narragansetts had also been seeking tribute from the Montauks, which gave the Montauks reason to suspect that unity would mean Narragansett domination.

=== Hearing at Boston, 1642 ===
In September 1642 Connecticut warned Massachusetts of a general Native conspiracy to kill all the English after the harvest, and urged it to begin a war at once. While a general court was being summoned, Massachusetts disarmed the Native peoples within its own jurisdiction, promising to return their arms once they were found innocent. The court judged the reports "not sufficient ground for us to begin a war", suspecting that they came out of the enmity between Miantonomi and Uncas, "who continually sought to discredit each other with the English", but summoned Miantonomi to Boston to answer the charges.

While Massachusetts waited for him, new letters arrived from Connecticut saying that it was now resolved on war and might begin without waiting for a reply. After a day's consultation, the Massachusetts magistrates, deputies and elders again judged the reports too doubtful to justify war. They wrote to dissuade Connecticut, arguing that it would dishonor all the colonies to make war while Massachusetts was still negotiating, and Connecticut held back, though "unwillingly".

Miantonomi came to Boston within the time set and spent two days before the court. He insisted that his counselors be present as witnesses to all he said, and Winthrop recorded that he answered "very deliberate[ly]", with "good understanding in the principles of justice and equity". He demanded that his accusers be brought forward and, if their charges proved false, put to death, as he would have been had they been true. When the magistrates said they did not believe the reports, he asked why they had then taken away Native peoples' guns. They answered that it was a precaution after raids on English houses at Saco, in present-day Maine, and he accepted this. He offered to prove Uncas's treachery to his face, and said that though others had warned him the English would kill or imprison him, "he knew them to be so just, as they would do him no wrong". He resisted promising to abandon the Niantics, calling them "his own flesh, being allied by continual intermarriages", but finally agreed not to defend them if they wronged the English and neither they nor he could make amends. Massachusetts kept up its military watches until late October and returned the weapons it had taken, judging that it would be unjust to take away guns that the Native peoples had obtained lawfully by trade and used for hunting.

=== Sale of Shawomet, 1643 ===
On January 12, 1643 (1642 Old Style), Miantonomi sold Shawomet, covering present-day Warwick and Coventry, to Samuel Gorton and his followers for 144 fathoms of wampum. Gorton, a religious radical and persistent critic of Massachusetts, had clashed with the authorities in Massachusetts, Plymouth and the Rhode Island towns of Portsmouth and Providence, and had left neighboring Pawtuxet after its English settlers placed themselves under Massachusetts in 1642. The historian John A. Sainsbury writes that Massachusetts, which had accepted Miantonomi as a nominal ally as late as 1642, turned against him after the sale, which sheltered a Massachusetts enemy and strengthened the Rhode Island settlements that stood in the way of its expansion on Narragansett Bay.

That spring Pomham, the sachem of Shawomet, disowned the deed, saying he had signed it only "through fear of Miantunnomoh". When Miantonomi could not prove that Pomham and Sacononoco, the sachem of Pawtuxet, were his subjects, the two placed themselves and their lands under Massachusetts on June 22, 1643, bringing Gorton's settlement under the colony's jurisdiction and giving it a foothold within Narragansett country.

Randall Holden, one of the buyers, later claimed that the sachems' interpreter, Benedict Arnold, whose family had placed Pawtuxet under Massachusetts, had said that Miantonomi would "lose his head" for selling Shawomet to Gorton's party. Sainsbury takes this as evidence that the sale, not only the rumors of conspiracy, turned the English against Miantonomi, and concludes that the United Colonies' commissioners who later decided his fate "were clearly prejudiced against him in a way which the official record of proceedings does not overtly indicate".

== War with Uncas and death ==
=== Pequot attempt on Uncas ===
In the spring of 1643 Uncas was shot in the arm by a Pequot whom he accused Miantonomi of hiring to kill him. Miantonomi brought the Pequot to Boston, where the man claimed that Uncas had cut his own arm; Miantonomi promised to send him to Uncas for judgment, but instead had him killed on the way home, which seemed to the English to confirm the charge. The evidence comes almost entirely from the colonial record, and historians have weighed it differently. Chapin held that nothing was proved against Miantonomi; Michael Oberg accepts the colonists' conclusion and sees the attempt as part of Miantonomi's effort to remove Uncas, whose close ties to the English stood in the way of the pan-Indian alliance Miantonomi was urging.

=== Saukiog attempt on Uncas ===
Sequassen, a sachem at Saukiog on the Connecticut River under Narragansett protection and Miantonomi's kinsman, had attacked Uncas's people and refused the efforts of the Connecticut magistrates, led by the governor, John Haynes, to reconcile them. In July 1643 Uncas retaliated, killing seven or eight of Sequassen's men, wounding thirteen and burning their wigwams. Miantonomi complained to Haynes, who replied that the English "had no hand in it" and would encourage neither side. Miantonomi then asked Massachusetts whether it "would not be offended, if he made war upon Onkus", and the governor, John Winthrop, answered that if Uncas had wronged him and would not make amends, Massachusetts would "leave him to take his own course".

=== Battle of the Great Plain and the capture of Miantonomi ===
In August 1643 Miantonomi led a large force into Mohegan territory. Winthrop put it at nearly a thousand men against three or four hundred under Uncas; the Norwich historian Frances M. Caulkins thought both figures roughly double the real numbers. According to accounts that Caulkins drew from early histories and Mohegan tradition, the Narragansetts crossed the Shetucket and Yantic rivers and met the Mohegans on the Great Plain, south of the Yantic in present-day Norwich. Uncas proposed that the two sachems settle the matter by single combat; Miantonomi replied, "My men came to fight, and they shall fight." Uncas then dropped to the ground as a signal, and his men loosed their arrows and charged. The Narragansetts broke and fled north toward the fords of the Shetucket, a few miles away. About thirty were killed, and two sons of Canonicus and a brother of Miantonomi were among the wounded.

Miantonomi, slowed by a coat of English armor that Gorton's party had lent him, (Note: Winthrop calls it "a coat of mail"; Caulkins thought it "probably... only a padded or quilted vest".) was overtaken near the Shetucket, at the place now known as Sachem's Plain. Winthrop wrote that two of his own captains seized him and handed him to Uncas, hoping to win their own pardon, but Uncas killed the two men at once; Mohegan tradition credits the capture to the warrior Tantaquidgeon, who repeatedly blocked his flight until he was taken. Brought before Uncas, Miantonomi stood silent. Uncas asked why he would not speak, saying that had Miantonomi captured him, he would have begged for his life. Miantonomi made no reply, "choosing rather to die, than to make supplication for his life".

Uncas first took Miantonomi to the Mohegan stronghold at Shantok, on the Thames River. There the Narragansetts sent Uncas wampum and goods, which they understood as a ransom for Miantonomi's life. Oberg suggests, from the limited surviving evidence, that the two sachems talked at length at Shantok, and that Miantonomi proposed they join forces against the English, an alliance to be sealed by his marrying one of Uncas's daughters. When news of the capture reached Providence, Gorton and his followers wrote to Uncas demanding Miantonomi's release. They threatened him with the power of the English and sent the letter in the name of the governor of Massachusetts, as though that colony stood behind the demand. Uncas then took Miantonomi to Hartford to ask the Connecticut magistrates what to do with him. Miantonomi earnestly begged to remain with the English rather than go back with Uncas, and Uncas left him in Connecticut's custody, where he was kept under guard but, Winthrop wrote, "used… very courteously".

=== Verdict ===
The commissioners of the newly formed United Colonies, meeting at Boston in September 1643, took up the case, and two records of their decision survive. Their official record recalled Miantonomi's "ambitious designes to make himself universall Sagomore or Governor of all these parts" and his efforts to unite the Native peoples against the English. It based the verdict, however, on the Treaty of Hartford, under which neither sachem was to make war on the other without first bringing his grievance to the English. Finding that he had attacked Uncas "without any provocacon" and that Uncas "cannot be safe while Myantenomo lives", the commissioners concluded that Uncas "may justly put such a false & blood-thirsty enemie to death, but in his owne Jurisdiccon, not in the English plantacons", and promised Uncas protection from Narragansett reprisals.

Winthrop, who presided over the commissioners, recorded a less certain judgment in his journal. They had agreed that it would not be safe to release Miantonomi, "neither had we sufficient ground for us to put him to death"; they reached their decision only after consulting "five of the most judicious elders", who "all agreed that he ought to be put to death", and they bound themselves to secrecy so that the Narragansetts would not learn of it before the commissioners had returned home. Winthrop gave four reasons for the sentence: that Miantonomi was "the head and contriver" of a general conspiracy against the English, that he was "of a turbulent and proud spirit", that he had killed the Pequot accused of attacking Uncas, and that he had beaten one of Pomham's men. Sainsbury and Grant note that Miantonomi had followed the treaty and sought the colonies' permission before attacking Uncas, which the commissioners' record does not mention, and Grant concludes that the commissioners had no legal grounds for the sentence. Grant, Fisher and Silverman, and the historian Christine DeLucia argue that by leaving the killing itself to Uncas, within Mohegan territory, the United Colonies distanced themselves from a death they had ordered, removing their greatest Native rival while directing Narragansett revenge at the Mohegans rather than at their own settlements.

=== Execution ===
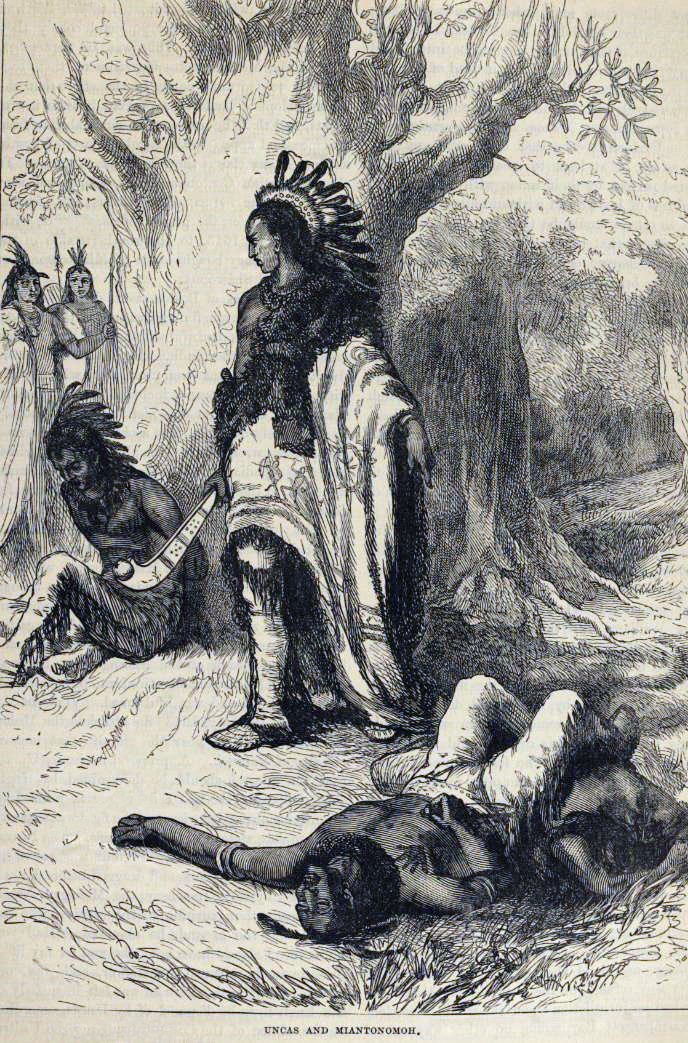
Uncas killing Miantonomi, as imagined in Cassell's History of the United States (1874)

On their return to Connecticut the commissioners sent for Uncas, who "readily undertook the execution". Late in September 1643, on the way between Hartford and Windsor, where some of Uncas's people lived, Uncas's brother came up behind Miantonomi and "clave his head with an hatchet", with some English present as witnesses. (Note: Later accounts name the brother as Wawequa. A tradition that Uncas cut flesh from the body and ate it rests only on a manuscript of 1769, and Caulkins judged that it had "the vague and exaggerative features of fiction".) (Note: The day is not recorded in Winthrop's published journal. A note in the Collections of the Massachusetts Historical Society gives September 28, 1643, from Winthrop's manuscript, and Caulkins judged that date consistent with the commissioners' first meeting in September and with Connecticut's dispatch of soldiers to protect Uncas on October 12. Oberg's date of August 1643 precedes the commissioners' meeting at which he was sentenced.) The commissioners made no secret of their approval: so that Native peoples "might know that the English did approve of it", twelve or fourteen musketeers went home with Uncas to protect him. William Bradford, the governor of Plymouth, wrote in his history that Uncas had carried out the sentence "in a very fair manner according as they advised, with due respect to his honor and greatness"; the literary scholar Robert Daly reads the passage as an attempt to conceal how Miantonomi was actually killed. The site of his death and burial is unknown. (Note: Caulkins concluded that the killing took place at an unknown spot near the old boundary of Hartford and Windsor. A Norwich tradition, recorded in 1769 and followed by Benjamin Trumbull, placed both execution and burial at Sachem's Plain, which Caulkins identified instead as the place of his capture.)

== Aftermath ==
Miantonomi's brother Pessicus, then about twenty, became sachem with the aged Canonicus. In October 1643 Pessicus sent the governor of Massachusetts an otter coat and wampum, asking for peace with the English and freedom to make war on Uncas "in revenge of his brother's death"; Massachusetts refused the gift unless the Narragansetts kept peace with Uncas. In April 1644 Canonicus, Pessicus and Canonicus's son Mixanno, through Samuel Gorton, placed themselves and their lands under the English Crown, so that Massachusetts and the other United Colonies could claim no authority over them. When Massachusetts summoned them that May, Pessicus declined, writing of Miantonomi as "our late deceased brother", "such an instrument as he was amongst us, for our common good", and of Uncas as "our so inhuman and cruel adversary, who took so great a ransom to release him, and his life also when that was done".

In September 1644 deputies sent by Pessicus and Canonicus put their case to the commissioners at Hartford. The commissioners found no proof that a ransom had been agreed, though their record acknowledged that Uncas and his men had spoken of sparing Miantonomi's life for wampum and goods of great value, and that Uncas had received wampum from the Narragansetts "for preserving his life so long and using him curteously". They forbade the Narragansetts to make war on Uncas, and the deputies agreed to a truce until after the next planting season.

In 1645 the Narragansetts attacked the Mohegans with guns. Williams wrote that "there is a spirit of desperation fallen upon them... resolved to revenge the death of their prince and recover their ransom for his life etc. or to perish with him." When Massachusetts envoys came to Narragansett country, Canonicus kept them waiting in the rain, and Pessicus sent them home with an old Pequot woman as their guide, an allusion, Fisher and Silverman note, to the interpreter Massachusetts had once pressed on Miantonomi. Facing an army raised by the United Colonies, Pessicus agreed to pay them a fine of two thousand fathoms of wampum and to give hostages. Canonicus died in June 1647. The Niantic sachem Jannemo, who after Miantonomi's death took the name Ninigret, rose to power on his pledge to make Uncas pay for that death.

== Personal life ==
=== Character and relationships ===
The only surviving description of Miantonomi's appearance comes from the Massachusetts minister William Hubbard, writing later in the 17th century, who described him as tall and handsome, "a very good personage", but also as cunning and "haughty". Rubertone, reading the whole written record, sees him as "honorable, charismatic, tough minded, politically astute, vocal, and angry".

Roger Williams found him easier to deal with than Canonicus. Miantonomi had recently stayed at Williams's house with his attendants, Williams wrote in May 1637: "with him I have far better dealing ... he takes some pleasure to visit me." At one such meeting a Native visitor from Connecticut disputed Williams's teaching about heaven and hell. Miantonomi replied that Williams "hath books and writings, and one which God himselfe made, concerning mens soules, and therefore may well know more than wee that have none, but take all upon trust from our forefathers".

He insisted on being treated as the colonists' equal. At the 1642 hearing in Boston, when he was seated with the other Native visitors rather than with the magistrates, he refused to eat until the governor sent him food from his own table, and for the rest of his stay he sat at the magistrates' table. Rubertone points out that, like other Narragansett men, he had duties as a son, nephew, brother, husband, father and friend: he "was expected to emulate, to respect, to provide, to teach, to share, to travel, to fight, and sometimes to risk his life or die".

=== Marriages and descendants ===
Among sachem families, marriage joined lineages and built alliances, and a leading sachem might have several wives. Miantonomi's principal wife, and his wife at his death, was Wawaloam. She traveled with him to Hartford in 1638, and in 1639 sent a basket as a gift to Winthrop's wife, Margaret. She outlived him by many years. In a deposition recorded in June 1661 she described herself as "the wife of the deceased Sachem Miantonomy" (Note: In the same deposition Wawaloam called both Canonicus and Ninigret her "uncle". The Niantic writer Fred V. Brown observed in 1935 that Native kinship terms did not match English ones: cousins were called brothers and most older men fathers, which may explain why some later writers called Miantonomi a son of Canonicus.) and testified that he and Canonicus had won Misquamicut (later Westerly) by conquest well before the Pequot War and given it to a Native captain as a reward "for service done for us".

Wawaloam's origins are disputed, and LaFantasie judged them "impossible to sort out". The antiquarian Sidney S. Rider and the Tomaquag Museum describe her as a daughter of Sequassen, and Chapin argued for kinship with the Niantic sachems. The Hartford historian William DeLoss Love and, more recently, the scholars Katherine Hermes and Alexandra Maravel, held that Miantonomi married Wawarme, a sister of Sequassen; scholars differ on whether Wawarme and Wawaloam were the same woman, but agree that a strong bond of kinship linked Miantonomi and Sequassen. After the Pequot War Miantonomi also took high-status Pequot wives, as Uncas did.

Miantonomi had three sons: one who died young; Paupauquivwut, also called Maussecup or Moosup, who died in 1700; (Note: Love suggested that Wawarme was Maussecup's mother.) and Canonchet. Canonchet led the Narragansetts in King Philip's War, the war against the colonies led by the Wampanoag sachem Metacom (King Philip), and was captured and executed in 1676; some accounts, none of them by eyewitnesses, say that Uncas's son Owaneco carried out the killing. Miantonomi's nephew Quinnapin, son of his brother Cojonoquant, was also a Narragansett leader in the war and held Mary Rowlandson captive.

== Legacy ==
=== Historical assessments ===
Historians have long debated the purpose of his campaign for Native unity in 1642–1643: whether it was a plan to attack the colonies or an effort to check their expansion without war. His colonial contemporaries assumed the worst: Winthrop, though he praised Miantonomi's conduct before the Massachusetts court in 1642, called him "a very subtile man", and Hubbard called him "subtle and cunning". Some modern scholars have also seen a plan for war. The historian Alden T. Vaughan and the anthropologist Paul Alden Robinson called him "the ringleader of a general Indian conspiracy", while Oberg, who likewise sees him organizing resistance, calls him "a skilled and farsighted Indian leader who pursued a strategy of unification to stem the incursions of colonization". Others see a political strategy. The historian Neal Salisbury judged that his movement "would have been less likely to result in violence than in an effective institutional counterweight to expansion by Connecticut and Massachusetts Bay", and the historian Daragh Grant argues that he kept within the Treaty of Hartford to the end, treating even his attack on Uncas as "a war within the logic of the Treaty". The historian Katherine A. Grandjean questions whether there was a plot at all, noting that the Montauk speech reached Gardiner secondhand and was written down twenty years later. Fisher and Silverman find both aims in his appeal, a genuine call to resist colonial encroachment combined with longstanding Narragansett claims over neighboring peoples, and the historian Thomas Wickman reads the campaign not as a "futile call for resistance" but as "a broad-based, early movement for food sovereignty", a defense of the lands and waters that sustained Native communities.

Judgments of his execution have changed more sharply. From the 18th century onward, Rhode Island and Connecticut historians condemned it as a breach of faith; Caulkins called it "one of the most flagrant acts of injustice and ingratitude that stands recorded against the English settlers". Later writers differ over where the blame lies. Some point to Uncas. In 1935 the Niantic writer Fred V. Brown, writing in the Narragansett monthly The Narragansett Dawn, called Miantonomi "Rhode Island's greatest native friend" and Uncas "a great falsifier" whom the English upheld "to the detriment of the Narragansetts"; the archaeologist Eric Spencer Johnson saw the Narragansetts as victims of "an effective smear campaign" by Uncas; and Grandjean judges that many of the plots reported against Miantonomi were probably invented by him. Others point to the colonies: Sainsbury argues that Miantonomi's dealings with Gorton made him an obstacle to Massachusetts' ambitions on Narragansett Bay.

Historians have also traced the effects of his campaign after his death. Grandjean notes that colonial fear of it helped prompt the founding of the United Colonies in 1643, the body that condemned him weeks later, and that in 1669 the Connecticut commander John Mason, who had led the attack on the Pequots at Mystic, likened a rumored Native conspiracy against the colonists to "Myantomo his plott". Silverman writes that after Miantonomi's plan was foiled, Ninigret and the Wampanoag leaders Wamsutta and Metacom "took up the cause", producing repeated war scares between 1647 and 1671. DeLucia writes that his call for unity "arguably laid intellectual and social groundwork for the resistances of the 1670s", and the historian Jeffrey Ostler sees in King Philip's War the acceleration of the processes Miantonomi had warned against.

=== Commemoration ===
Miantonomi has been remembered in several ways. A granite monument marks the place of his capture at Sachem's Plain, in Norwich, Connecticut. Inscribed markers to him were set up on Exeter Hill, Rhode Island, in 1923. A hill in Newport where he traditionally held councils is now a memorial park. Statues of him planned for Providence were never built. Four United States Navy ships and two Rhode Island bridges have carried his name. In 1997 he and Canonicus were inducted into the Rhode Island Heritage Hall of Fame.

Not everyone welcomed the stone monuments. The Mohegan anthropologist Gladys Tantaquidgeon objected to the Exeter Hill stones and suggested that educational projects would do more to make the public aware of Native peoples. A 2020 video about the stones, produced by the Tomaquag Museum, argued that monuments of this kind "helped legitimize settler claims that Native Americans had disappeared", and that the Narragansetts have instead kept their history in natural features of the landscape: "they tell a story through geography, not inscription".

Among the Narragansetts, whose custom was not to speak the names of the dead, the names of Canonicus, Canonchet and Miantonomi have in recent generations again been given to children.

==== Monuments and memorials ====
Memorials to Miantonomi
1	Sachem's Plain, Norwich: Miantonomo monument, 1841
2	Exeter Hill: markers to Miantonomi, Wawaloam and Aspanansuck, 1923
3	Miantonomi Memorial Park, Newport: hill where he traditionally held councils

The 1841 Miantonomo monument at Sachem's Plain, Norwich (1910 postcard)

A heap of stones grew up at Sachem's Plain, near the Shetucket River in present-day Norwich, where Miantonomi was captured. Caulkins thought it began as a Mohegan trophy of victory; for many years afterward Mohegans who passed it added stones in triumph and Narragansetts in mourning, and local tradition came to regard it as his grave. Brown recorded the Narragansett custom of an annual pilgrimage to the grave "to weep, wail and mourn", at which every passing Narragansett would add a stone. A later owner of the land used most of the stones in the foundation of a barn.

In July 1841 citizens of Norwich, led by William C. Gilman, set a granite block inscribed "Miantonomo 1643" near the site of the vanished heap, during a children's temperance festival in the village of Greeneville. (Note: Caulkins gives the date as July 4, 1841; the Norwich Bulletin report of the dedication places the ceremony on the morning of July 5.) On September 29, 1995, Mohegan and Narragansett representatives visited the Miantonomo and Uncas monuments, the site of the battle on the Great Plain and Indian Leap in Norwich, exchanged gifts and vows of peace, and broke four arrows as a sign of peace between the two nations; the ceremony also dedicated a historical sign at the Miantonomo monument, one of nine bought by the Norwich Tourism Office with a grant from the Gernon Foundation. In 2006 the Norwich city council asked the state to transfer the monument site to the city.

On October 28, 1923, three upright granite markers were dedicated on Exeter Hill, Rhode Island, on the supposed site of the Narragansett village of Aspanansuck, where Wawaloam was said to have lived after her husband's death. They are inscribed "Miantonomi", "Aspanansuck Village–1620" and "Wawaloam, Sunck Squaw". Delegations from Rhode Island, Massachusetts and Connecticut were expected at the ceremony, and descendants of the Narragansetts, Niantics and Nipmucks were invited. The markers were announced as the first of 40 to 50 memorials to the Narragansetts and their sachems between Boston and Stonington, planned by the Providence historian Thomas W. Bicknell with the support of the sculptor Cyrus Dallin and others. The markers stand on the embankment of Route 102 (Ten Rod Road); by 2019 most of their lettering had worn away.

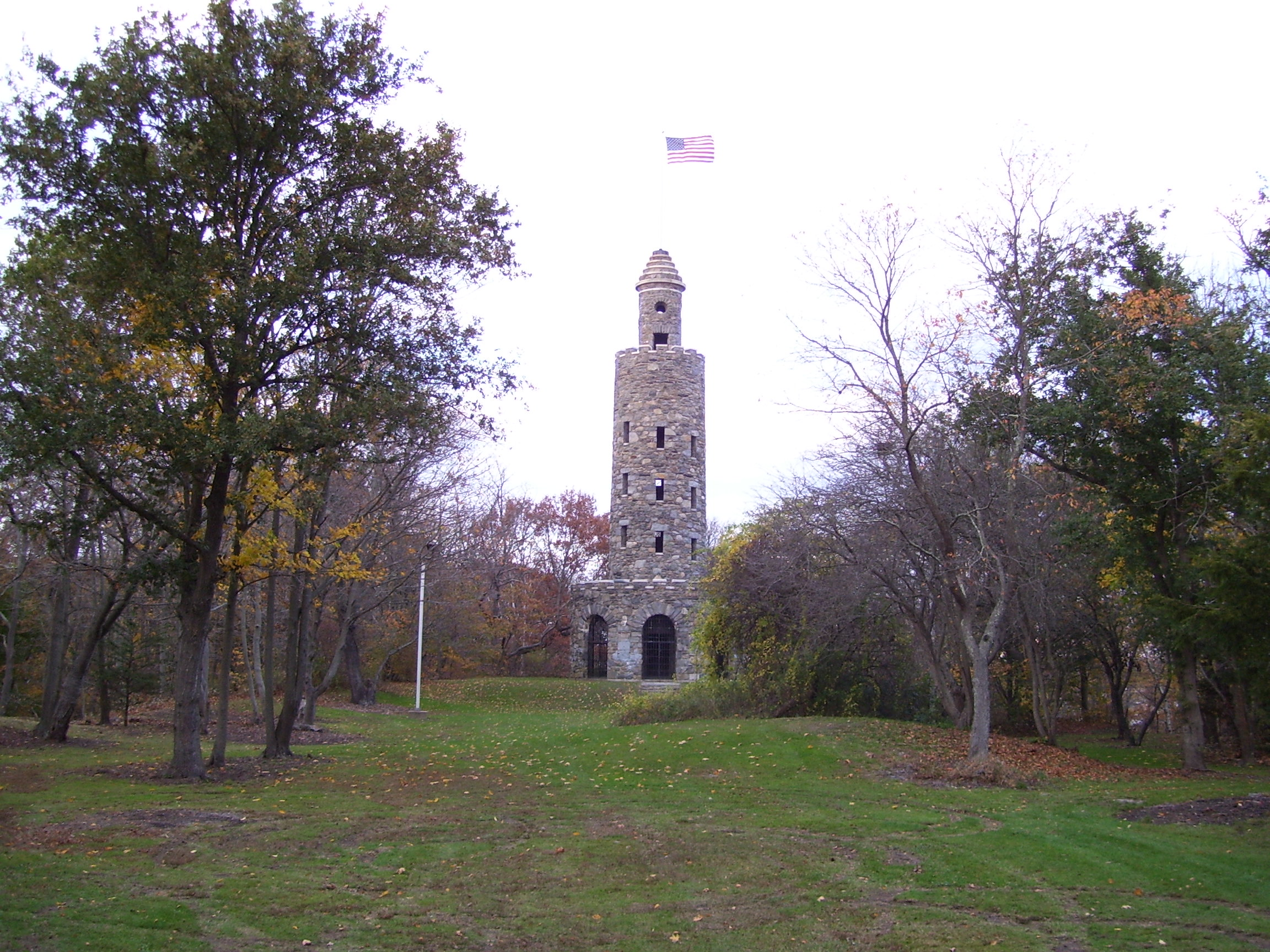
Miantonomi Memorial Park, Newport, Rhode Island

In Newport, the hill traditionally regarded as the place where Miantonomi held councils, described in its 1969 nomination to the National Register of Historic Places as his "seat of power", is now Miantonomi Memorial Park. The city bought the hill as a park in 1921, and in 1929 a memorial tower to Newport's dead of the First World War was built on its summit. (Note: The hill's name has been recorded as "Wonomitonomo" (1667), Tomony (Revolutionary War) and Wonnumentonomey, Miantonomi or Tomany (1969). The 1969 nomination also names Wonnumentonomey as a local sachem on Aquidneck Island in 1638, so not every form necessarily refers to Miantonomi.)

Plans of 1865 for a monument to Roger Williams in Providence called for statues of Canonicus and Miantonomi; when the monument was finally built on Prospect Terrace in the 1930s, the sachems were dropped from the design.

==== Namesakes ====
The United States Navy has named four ships after him. Two were ironclad monitors named Miantonomoh. The first, the lead ship of the Miantonomoh class, was launched in 1863, commissioned in 1865, decommissioned in 1870 and broken up in 1875. The second was launched in 1876 but not completed until 1891; it took part in the blockade of Cuba during the Spanish–American War in 1898, was decommissioned in 1907 and sold in 1922. Two minelayers were named Miantonomah. The first, built in 1938 as the coastal steamer Quaker, was acquired by the Navy and renamed in 1941 and sank after an underwater explosion off Le Havre on September 25, 1944, with the loss of about 58 men. The second, built in 1943 as the Army mine planter Colonel Horace F. Spurgin, was commissioned by the Navy in 1950, named Miantonomah in 1955, decommissioned the same year and sold in 1961.

Two bridges on Route 2 near the Richmond–Charlestown line, reconstructed in 1996, are named the Miantonomi and Wawaloam Bridges.

=== Repatriation of the Slater Museum bowl ===
A carved wooden bowl with a bear's-head effigy, given to the Slater Memorial Museum in Norwich by its founder, William A. Slater, at the museum's founding in 1886 and long displayed as a succotash bowl, is held in Narragansett tradition to have been buried with Miantonomi and later taken from his grave. The Narragansett ethnohistorian Ella Sekatau and the Mohegan tribal historian Melissa Fawcett identified it as his. The Narragansetts sought its return for four generations: John Brown, the tribe's historic preservation officer, said that his great-grandfather, a tribal medicine man, had tried to recover it in the late 19th or early 20th century, and that his grandfather and uncle had continued the effort.

In June 1995, while clearing out part of its Native American collection, the museum sold the bowl at Christie's in New York for $90,500 to two art dealers, one of whom disputed the tribe's claim, arguing that the bowl was in too good a condition to have been buried. Mashantucket Pequot officials who saw it in the auction catalog alerted Fawcett, who informed the Narragansetts and the National Park Service. The U.S. Attorney's office and the FBI investigated whether the sale had violated the Native American Graves Protection and Repatriation Act, which makes trafficking in Native burial goods a federal crime, and a federal grand jury was convened. The sale was rescinded in October 1995 and the bowl returned to the museum.

In January 1997 the museum returned a bowl believed to have been carved for Uncas, with other burial items, to the Mohegans. On March 14, under a pretrial diversion agreement that ended the grand jury proceedings, it handed the Narragansett bowl to Brown, who was accompanied by the chair of the Mohegan Council of Elders. Brown showed it at the Mohegan tribal offices in Montville before taking it home to Rhode Island, and credited the three nations' cooperation: "What was broken in the past with Miantonomo and the Narragansetts and the Pequots and the Mohegans has now been undone."

== See also ==
- Mystic massacre
- New England Confederation
- Pequot War
- Treaty of Hartford (1638)
