= Pessicus =

Narragansett sachem (c. 1623–1676)

Sachem of the Narragansett
- In office 1643–1647 Serving with Canonicus
- Preceded by: Miantonomi

Sachem of the Narragansett
- In office 1647–c. 1658 Serving with Mixanno

Sachem of the Narragansett
- In office c. 1658–1676 Serving with Cojonoquant, Scuttop and others

Personal details
- Born: c. 1623
- Died: May or June 1676 near the Piscataqua River
- Parent: Mascus
- Relatives: Miantonomi (brother); Canonicus (uncle); Canonchet (nephew); Ninigret (cousin)
- Other names: Quissucquansh, Moosup, Canonicus

Pessicus (c. 1623 – 1676), also called Quissucquansh, Moosup and, in his last years, Canonicus, (Note: Chapin spells the name Pessacus and lists his other names as Quissucquansh, Sucquans, Wemosit, Moosup and Canonicus; Fisher and Silverman give the same list, and Chapin elsewhere spells Sucquans as Sequans. Quissucquansh and Moosup appear in records of the 1660s, and the 1675 Rose Island deed spells the latter Maussopp. Narragansett sachems changed their names from time to time, often at major ceremonies. The philologist W. B. Cabot, whose views Chapin reported, thought many sachems' names were taken from places, so that the name Moosup might be derived from a place called Moosup. Another Moosup, also called Paupauquivwut, was a son of Miantonomi.) was a chief sachem of the Narragansett people, whose homeland was in present-day Rhode Island. A younger brother of Miantonomi, he was chosen at about the age of twenty to succeed him in 1643, sharing the leadership first with his aged uncle Canonicus and later with Canonicus's son Mixanno.

In 1644 Pessicus and Canonicus placed the Narragansetts under the protection of King Charles I and tried to avenge Miantonomi's execution by making war on the Mohegan sachem Uncas. The United Colonies forced them to accept a peace in 1645. In later decades his cousin Ninigret overshadowed him in dealings with the English. On the eve of King Philip's War he took his uncle's name, Canonicus. He sought peace but could not restrain the younger warriors, and in 1676 he was killed by Mohawks after leading a band of Narragansetts north to the Piscataqua River.

== Family and early life ==
Pessicus was a son of the sachem Mascus, a younger brother of Canonicus. Mascus's sons were, in order, Mecumeh, later called Miantonomi; Yotaash; Pessicus; and Cojonoquant, also called Tassaquanawit. He is said to have been born about 1623. A genealogy of the Narragansett sachems written in 1703 also names Miantonomi and Pessicus as sons of Canonicus's brother. Chapin concluded that after Mascus's death his widow married another of Canonicus's brothers.

Descendants of Tashtassuck
Canonicus	Mascus	A daughter (married a Niantic sachem)
Mixanno	Miantonomi	Yotaash	Pessicus	Cojonoquant	Quaiapen	Ninigret
Canonchet	Eldest son (hostage, 1645)

Pessicus's family, simplified (Note: Simplified from Chapin's genealogical table. Mascus's sons are shown in birth order. Canonicus's other sons, and Pessicus's other children, are omitted. The descent from Tashtassuck is traditional and its generations are uncertain.)

== Chief sachem with Canonicus, 1643–1647 ==
In 1643 Miantonomi was captured by Uncas and, with the approval of the commissioners of the United Colonies, put to death. Miantonomi's sons were too young to succeed him, and Canonicus, then nearly eighty and frail, did not take on the leadership alone, so the Narragansetts chose Pessicus, then about twenty, to rule with him. In October 1643 Pessicus sent an otter coat and a girdle of wampum to the governor of Massachusetts, asking for a treaty of friendship and for permission to make war on the Mohegans. Massachusetts refused, and refused again when he renewed the request in the spring.

On April 19, 1644, Pessicus, as "chief sachem and successor of that late deceased Miantonomi", signed with Canonicus and Mixanno an act submitting the Narragansetts and their lands to the protection of King Charles I. When Massachusetts sent messengers to ask about the submission, Canonicus referred them to Pessicus. Pessicus kept the messengers waiting four hours and then talked with them most of the night. He told them the Narragansetts would soon make war on Uncas, but "not in the manner as Miantonomi had done, by a great army, but by sending out parties of twenty or more or less, to catch his men and keep them from getting their living".

The raids began almost at once. Narragansetts killed six Mohegan men and five women, and Pessicus sent two hands and a foot to the Shawomet sachem Pomham as an invitation to join the war; Pomham refused and turned to Massachusetts for protection. A truce was signed at Hartford on September 18, 1644, to last until "next planting time". In February 1645 Pessicus warned that the war would resume unless Uncas paid 160 fathoms of wampum, and that spring Narragansett war parties again raided Mohegan country and badly wounded Tantaquigeon, the warrior who had captured Miantonomi. In May 1645 a Narragansett force armed with thirty guns made a surprise attack on the Mohegans, killing four of their leading men. Nineteenth-century writers described how the Narragansetts, led by Pessicus, besieged Uncas in his fort on the Thames River, some eight or ten miles above its mouth, until colonists from Saybrook brought provisions by canoe at night.

By August 1645 the United Colonies had armies in the field and were preparing to invade Narragansett country. Pessicus and Mixanno went to Boston expecting to negotiate, but were given a choice between war and a list of conditions. By the treaty of August 27, 1645, the Narragansetts agreed to pay 2,000 fathoms of wampum and to hand over four children as hostages, among them Pessicus's eldest son and a son of his brother Cojonoquant. Pessicus later said that "when he made his covenant he did it in fear of the Army". The Narragansetts were slow to pay, and the hostages lived among the English for more than a year before Ninigret won their release in 1647. During this time the Massachusetts authorities had one of Pessicus's sons treated for a fistula, an abnormal passage in the body usually caused by infection or injury, by the Boston practitioner Thomas Oliver; in May 1647 the colony paid for the twenty-week cure and his board, and then pressed Pessicus to repay it.

== Rule with Mixanno, 1647–c. 1658 ==
After Canonicus died in 1647, Pessicus shared the leadership with his cousin Mixanno. The historian Glenn W. LaFantasie writes that they kept up the joint rule "in name only" and relied on Ninigret for advice in dealing with the English. The antiquarian Howard M. Chapin judged Ninigret "far abler than his overlords, Pessacus and Mixanno", whose prestige declined as his grew.

In September 1650 the United Colonies sent Captain Humphrey Atherton with twenty men to collect wampum still owed. During a council at Pessicus's wigwam, Atherton entered with a pistol in hand, seized Pessicus by the hair and dragged him outside, announcing that he would carry him and Ninigret off by force. Roger Williams, who had come as interpreter, protested and helped avert a fight; the Narragansetts, who outnumbered the English, then paid in full.

Relations with the Rhode Island colony were peaceful. In May 1650 it gave Pessicus permission to gather chestnut bark on Aquidneck to cover a wigwam. The United Colonies remained concerned about whom the Narragansetts might ally with. In September 1653, when Uncas accused the Narragansetts of plotting with the Dutch, the commissioners sent envoys to question Pessicus, Mixanno and Ninigret, who denied any part in it.

== Later rule, c. 1658–1675 ==
Mixanno died between 1656 and 1659. From then on Pessicus, now usually called Sequans or Quissucquansh, appears on legal documents as one of several chief sachems, with his brother Cojonoquant and Mixanno's sons Scuttop and Quequaquenuit. From 1657 these sachems, Cojonoquant above all, sold or granted large tracts to the English, among them Conanicut and several smaller islands of the bay and Boston Neck; most of the sales were confirmed by the other chief sachems.

When Charles II's royal commissioners arrived in New England in 1664, Pessicus and Ninigret were among the first to meet them, presenting a copy of the 1644 submission and a petition against Massachusetts. In 1665 the commissioners ruled that the Narragansett country belonged neither to Massachusetts nor to the Atherton Company, a group of land speculators led by Humphrey Atherton, renamed it the King's Province, and promised the sachems protection from injustice by the king's subjects. In return the Narragansetts pledged a yearly tribute of two wolf skins and agreed not to make war or sell land without the commissioners' consent. According to the commissioners' report, Pessicus also asked them to request that the king stop strong liquor from being brought into the country, since thirty-two of his men had died from drinking it. The historian Adrian Chastain Weimer writes that the commissioners made promises to sachems such as Pessicus that they proved unable or unwilling to keep.

Pessicus and Ninigret were repeatedly summoned to answer charges of conspiracy or complaints about land. In May 1667, now called Moosup, Pessicus met colony officials with Cojonoquant and Ninigret at Warwick, and in 1669 both he and Ninigret appeared before the governor's council of Rhode Island. In May 1673 they were invited to Newport to discuss ways of preventing drunkenness among the Narragansetts.

== King Philip's War and death ==
By the mid-1670s Cojonoquant and Mixanno's sons had died, and the authority of the sachemdom was divided between Pessicus and Miantonomi's son Canonchet. About 1675 Pessicus again changed his name, taking that of his uncle Canonicus. A deed of May 1, 1675, for Rose Island is signed by "Connonicus formerly called Maussopp chief sachim of the Narragansett". The historians Julie A. Fisher and David J. Silverman write that the change "signaled that he saw this war as a defining moment for him and his people".

When King Philip's War began in 1675, Pessicus was said to have rejected the trophies that the Wampanoag leader Philip sent to the Narragansetts. He favored peace, but told messengers from Boston and Newport that autumn that he "could not rule the youth & common people", and could only advise the English settlers living in the Narragansett country to keep watch, fortify their houses or flee. After Canonchet was captured and executed in the spring of 1676, Pessicus sent an envoy to ask for peace, blaming Ninigret rather than the colonists for his nephew's death.

In early May 1676 Pessicus was among the sachems camped at Squakheag, on the Connecticut River near present-day Northfield, when messengers from the Connecticut colony asked them to bring English captives to the town of Hadley for release. As the Narragansetts broke into small bands in search of food and refuge, Pessicus led his family and followers north to the Piscataqua River, on the present-day boundary between New Hampshire and Maine. Mohawk raiders ambushed the group about twenty miles north of the river and killed him in May or June 1676.

== Legacy ==
Writing in 1906, the historians George W. Ellis and John E. Morris judged that in "farsightedness, prudence and tenacity" Philip was "undoubtedly superior to all, save possibly Pessacus".

The United States Navy gave his name to the harbor tug USS Pessacus (YT-192), launched in 1942, which also gave its name to the Pessacus class of harbor tugs, describing him as "a noted 17th century chief of the Narragansett tribe".
