= Tashtassuck =

Legendary sachem of the Narragansett people

Sachem of the Narragansett

Personal details
- Relatives: Canonicus, Miantonomi, Pessicus, Ninigret (descendants, 1703 account); Sassacus, Uncas (possible descendants, Chapin 1931)
- Known for: Earliest remembered sachem in Narragansett tradition
- Sachemship: Narragansett, Niantic and Coweset peoples, in what is now southern Rhode Island

Tashtassuck or Tashtassuc (Note: Also spelled Tashtasick, Tashassuck, Tashtsuck and Tashtapack.) is an early sachem in Narragansett tradition, remembered as a ruler of the Narragansett, Niantic and Coweset peoples in what is now southern Rhode Island. He is said to have married his son and daughter to each other because no partners of equal rank could be found for them. Canonicus and several other 17th-century Narragansett and Niantic sachems are counted among Tashtassuck's descendants.

== The tradition ==
=== Eighteenth-century accounts ===
The 1703 genealogy as printed from Stiles's copy in 1916. The tree below gives it as text.

Two 18th-century accounts record Tashtassuck, the extent of his rule and his family. The earliest is a paper enclosed with a letter from "E. Hutchinson" to Nathaniel Coddington of Newport in August 1703, (Note: The editor of the 1916 edition notes that Nathaniel Coddington, son of Governor William Coddington, was born in 1653 and married Susanna, sister of Elisha Hutchinson.) headed "A Genealogy of the Sachems of Narraganset, Niantic, Coweeset, and the parts adjacent, Canonicus being Chief Sachem when the English first came into the country". Its text is known through a copy made on 10 July 1762 by Ezra Stiles, then a minister in Newport, from "a loose Manuscript" of the Newport minister John Callender; Stiles's copy was published in 1916. It begins:

The antient Indians reported that in those Countries of Narraganset, Niantic, Coweesit & parts adjacent there was one great Sachem which had all the parts under him and ruling over all; his Name was Tashtasick. He had only a Son and a Daughter; and he, esteeming none of Degree for them to marry with, married them together.

— Account of 1703, as copied by Ezra Stiles in 1762

The second is a footnote in Thomas Hutchinson's History of the Colony of Massachusetts Bay (1764), which cites an unnamed manuscript:

The ancient Indians among the Naragansets reported, when the English first arrived, that they had in former times a sachem called Tashtassuck, incomparably greater than any in the whole land in power and state, that he had only two children, a son and a daughter, and not being able to match them according to their dignity, he joined them together in matrimony, and that they had four sons, of whom Canonicus, who was sachem when the English came, was the eldest.

— Thomas Hutchinson, 1764

Hutchinson called it "the only piece of Indian history, or tradition, of any sort from the ancestors of our first Indians, I have ever met with". The two accounts agree on the marriage of Tashtassuck's son and daughter, but differ on the extent of his rule and on their children.

The 18th-century accounts compared
	1703 paper (Stiles's copy)	Hutchinson (1764)
Name	Tashtasick	Tashtassuck
Informants	"The antient Indians"	"The ancient Indians among the Naragansets", when the English first arrived
Extent of rule	"Countries of Narraganset, Niantic, Coweesit & parts adjacent"	"the whole land"
Reason for the marriage	"esteeming none of Degree for them to marry with"	"not being able to match them according to their dignity"
Children of the marriage	Two sons (Canonicus and the father of Miantonomi and Pessicus) and a daughter (grandmother of Ninigret)	Four sons, Canonicus the eldest

Nineteenth-century writers repeated the tradition, mostly from Hutchinson and often in their own words. The antiquarian Samuel Gardner Drake, who retold it in 1836, wrote that the Narragansett praised Tashtassuck's "wisdom and valor" much as the Delaware (Lenape) praised their "great chief" Tamany, but added that "we do not give implicit credit to it, as, at best, it is tradition". (Note: Later Rhode Island histories, including Richard M. Bayles's History of Newport County (1888) and Wilkins Updike's A History of the Episcopal Church in Narragansett, Rhode Island (1907), quoted Drake's wording, including the comparison with Tamany, as Hutchinson's.)

=== Extent of rule ===
The 1703 account describes Tashtassuck as "one great Sachem" who had "all the parts under him" in "the Countries of Narraganset, Niantic, Coweesit & parts adjacent". Hutchinson called him "incomparably greater than any in the whole land in power and state". Glenn W. LaFantasie (1988) described him as "a powerful ruler who controlled a vast empire centered in the southern part of present-day Rhode Island".

Nineteenth-century writers presented his rule as the result of expansion. William R. Staples, in a note to his 1835 edition of Samuel Gorton's Simplicity's Defence against Seven-Headed Policy, wrote that under Tashtassuck the Narragansett "had extended its dominion over many of the neighboring tribes". Samuel G. Arnold (1859) went further, writing that under Canonicus's "warlike ancestor, Tashtassuck, the tribe had become a nation, and successive conquests had swelled the nation into an empire".

Howard M. Chapin (1931) placed the expansion two or more generations after Tashtassuck, judging it "probable that the extension of the authority of the Narragansetts over these neighboring tribes took place under the leadership of Mascus", the younger brother of Canonicus.

=== Marriage of his son and daughter ===
According to the 1703 account, Tashtassuck, "esteeming none of Degree for them to marry with", married his son and daughter to each other. Hutchinson gave the reason as his "not being able to match them according to their dignity".

Nathan E. Truman (1922) cautioned that "it is usually futile to attempt to rationalize a tradition", but suggested that the story might recall a time when "the ruling family of the tribe ceased the practice of exogamy", the rule of marrying outside one's own clan. On his reading, the daughter's husband may have been "her clan brother", a fellow member of her clan rather than a brother by birth. Julie A. Fisher and David J. Silverman (2014) called it "the moral of a Narragansett tradition" about marrying partners of equal status, and wrote that by the 17th century the sachem families of the Narragansett, Pequot, Mohegan and other peoples had married into one another, forming "an extended cousinage".

== Descendants ==
The Messengers at the Tent of Canonicus, an engraving after C. S. Reinhart showing envoys from Massachusetts Bay visiting Canonicus in 1644

Two genealogies trace leading sachems of the 17th century back to Tashtassuck. The 1703 paper descends to Canonicus, Miantonomi, Pessicus and Ninigret. Howard M. Chapin's conjectural pedigree of 1931 also reaches Canonicus, Miantonomi and Ninigret, and adds the Pequot sachem Sassacus and the Mohegan sachem Uncas.

=== 1703 paper ===
The 1703 account says the brother and sister had "two Sons and a Daughter": Canonicus (Note: Canonicus here is the sachem who died in 1647, called "Canonicus the Great" in the 1703 account; his name was also written Caunaunacus, Qunnoune and Quananone. The same account calls his nephew Pessicus "Canonicus the Second".) "the Great", a younger son who was the father of Miantonomi and Pessicus, and a daughter whose grandson was the Niantic sachem Ninigret. In Hutchinson's version (1764) the couple had four sons, "of whom Canonicus, who was sachem when the English came, was the eldest".

1703 paper pedigree (Stiles's copy)

- Tashtasick
  - Son and daughter, married to each other
    - Canonicus "the Great" (Canonicus, d. 1647, sachem when the English arrived)
      - Mecksa, m. Matautuck ("Ninegrate's Sister")
        - Scuttap
        - Quequackanuett
    - Canonicus's younger brother
      - Miantonomy (Miantonomi)
        - Miantinute, also Quenónset
      - Quescuckquenen, "Canonicus the Second", also Pesicus and Mossup (Pessicus)
      - Cojonaquane
        - Quanapin
    - Canonicus's sister
      - Webitameck
        - Tomtoco
      - Wariconchat, also Nineglad
        - Ninegrate (Ninigret)
      - Matautuck, m. Mecksa, described as "Ninegrate's Sister"

Nineteenth-century writers disagreed about Canonicus's line of descent. William R. Staples (1835) made Canonicus Tashtassuck's son. Richard M. Bayles (1888) went the other way and added a generation: in his account the brother and sister had a son, "the first Canonicus", who was the father of the Canonicus of the colonial period, whom Bayles also called "Quananone". Neither the 1703 account nor Hutchinson mentions an earlier Canonicus. Simmons (1978) later followed the 1703 account in calling Tashtasick the "grandfather of Canonicus".

=== Chapin's reconstruction ===
In Sachems of the Narragansetts (1931), published by the Rhode Island Historical Society, Chapin proposed a longer line of descent that draws on evidence outside the 1703 account. He judged it "nevertheless probable that there was an early Narragansett sachem named Tashtassuck", whose name survived in oral legend while those of his successors were forgotten. He noted that "similar traditions are common" in accounts of royal genealogies, and that such traditions tend "to omit generations" and to make a renowned ancestor "a much nearer ancestor than was actually the case".

Chapin's evidence was a claim by the Mohegan sachem Uncas that his grandmother's father was a Narragansett chief sachem named Weesoum. Neither the 1703 account nor Hutchinson names Weesoum. Chapin thought that Weesoum probably had a son who was the father of Canonicus (d. 1647), and gave that son the four sons of Hutchinson's account in place of Tashtassuck's children. He counted Tashtassuck as the first Narragansett sachem whose name has come down, Weesoum as the second, and Canonicus as the third. On this account Canonicus was at least Tashtassuck's great-great-grandson, and more distant if generations were missing between Tashtassuck's children and Weesoum. (Note: LaFantasie, citing Chapin in his 1988 edition of The Correspondence of Roger Williams, gave a shorter line, describing Canonicus as "probably the great-grandson of the legendary sachem, Tashtassuck (or Tashtapack)".)

Chapin's "conjectural pedigree" of the early Narragansett and Pequot sachems links Tashtassuck's children to Weesoum only by a question mark. Through Weesoum's daughter, who married Woipequand, it also descends to the Pequot sachem Sassacus and to Uncas. The pedigree therefore shows Narragansett, Niantic, Pequot and Mohegan sachems of the 17th century as possible descendants of Tashtassuck.

Chapin's conjectural pedigree (1931)

- Tashtassuck
  - Son and daughter, married to each other
    - ? (unknown generations)
      - Weesoum, m. Keshkechoo
        - (son)
          - Canonicus (c. 1565–1647)
          - (son)
          - (son)
          - Mascus
            - Miantonomi
          - (daughter), m. Sasious(?), sachem of the Niantic
            - Ninigret
        - (daughter), m. Woipequand
          - Wopigwooit
            - Sassacus, sachem of the Pequot
          - Owoneco
            - Uncas, sachem of the Mohegan

=== Summary ===
Accounts differ on how many generations separated Tashtassuck from Canonicus (d. 1647), from one, with Canonicus as his son, to four or more, with Canonicus as at least his second great-grandson.

Generations between Tashtassuck and Canonicus
Source	Date	Line of descent	Relation of Canonicus to Tashtassuck
1703 account	1703	Tashtassuck → son and daughter → Canonicus (d. 1647), with a brother and a sister	Grandson
Hutchinson	1764	Tashtassuck → son and daughter → Canonicus (d. 1647), eldest of four sons	Grandson
Staples	1835	Tashtassuck → Canonicus (d. 1647)	Son
Bayles	1888	Tashtassuck → son and daughter → "the first Canonicus" → Canonicus (d. 1647), "or Quananone"	Great-grandson
Chapin	1931	Tashtassuck → son and daughter → ? → Weesoum → a son → Canonicus (d. 1647)	Second great-grandson or more distant

== Later remembrance ==
In 1928 the Niantic/Narragansett writer Fred V. Brown wrote the poem "The Last of the Sachems", which opens with the story:

Tashassuck was a mighty chief,
With son and daughter fair,
No worthy peers 'twas said with grief,
Were found to wed the pair.

A legend wedding day, with pride,
To lift the Sachem's gloom,
That regal daughter was the bride,
His son royal the groom.

It was published in May 1935 in the first issue of The Narragansett Dawn, a monthly edited by Princess Red Wing "in the interest of the Narragansett Tribe of Indians".

At the 1883 dedication of a monument at Fort Ninigret in Charlestown by the state's Commission on the Affairs of the Narragansett Indians, the Baptist minister Frederic Denison called Canonicus's father "the famed Tashtassuck, distinguished alike for his wisdom and his valor". A month later, at the dedication of a boulder to Canonicus in Providence's North Burial Ground by the Rhode Island Historical Society, Horatio Rogers recalled "Tashtassuck, a mighty chief".

In Jamestown, on Conanicut Island, a steam fire engine bought in 1894 was named Tashtassuck No. 1 after the sachem; it is preserved in the town's fire department museum. Tashtassuc Road runs alongside Route 138 on the island.

== Sources ==
- Arnold, Samuel Greene (1859). History of the State of Rhode Island and Providence Plantations. Vol. 1: 1636–1700. New York: D. Appleton & Co.
- Bayles, Richard M., ed. (1888). History of Newport County, Rhode Island. New York: L. E. Preston & Co.
- Brown, Fred V. (May 1935). "The Last of the Sachems". The Narragansett Dawn. 1 (1): 20–21.
- Chapin, Howard M. (1931). Sachems of the Narragansetts. Providence: Rhode Island Historical Society.
- Conanicut's Best Cookery. Cookbook Norris Press. 2001.
- "Narragansett". Dawnland Voices: Indigenous Writings from New England.
- Douglas-Lithgow, R. A. (1909). Dictionary of American-Indian Place and Proper Names in New England. Salem, MA: Salem Press.
- Drake, Samuel G. (1836). Biography and History of the Indians of North America (5th ed.). Boston: Antiquarian Institute.
- Drake, Samuel G. (1841). The Book of the Indians (8th ed.). Boston: Antiquarian Bookstore.
- Elsworth, Peter C. T. (June 28, 2014). "Jamestown's old fire trucks still shine". Features. The Providence Journal.
- "Consigned to History: The Proceedings in the Matter of the Narragansett Indians; Dedication of the Monument at Fort Ninigret". The Evening Bulletin. Providence. August 31, 1883. p. 3.
- Fisher, Julie A.; Silverman, David J. (2014). Ninigret, Sachem of the Niantics and Narragansetts: Diplomacy, War, and the Balance of Power in Seventeenth-Century New England and Indian Country. Ithaca, NY: Cornell University Press. ISBN 978-0-8014-7046-2.
- Gorton, Samuel (1835). Staples, William R. (ed.). Simplicity's Defence against Seven-Headed Policy. Collections of the Rhode-Island Historical Society. Vol. 2. Providence: Marshall, Brown and Company.
- Hutchinson, Thomas (1765) [1764]. The History of the Colony of Massachusetts Bay (2nd ed.). London: M. Richardson.
- LaFantasie, Glenn W., ed. (1988). The Correspondence of Roger Williams. Vol. 1: 1629–1653. Providence and Hanover, NH: Rhode Island Historical Society; Brown University Press / University Press of New England. ISBN 0-87451-386-3.
- "[Review of] Biography and History of the Indians of North America, by Samuel G. Drake". North American Review. 44 (95): 301–334. April 1837. JSTOR 25103898.
- Rhode Island Historical Preservation & Heritage Commission (1995). Historic and Architectural Resources of Jamestown, Rhode Island (PDF). Providence.
- Rhode Island Historical Society (1883). Canonicus Memorial: Services of Dedication, under the Auspices of the Rhode Island Historical Society, September 21, 1883. Providence: Providence Press Company.
- Simmons, William S. (1978). "Narragansett". In Trigger, Bruce G. (ed.). Handbook of North American Indians. Vol. 15: Northeast. Washington, D.C.: Smithsonian Institution. pp. 190–197.
- Stiles, Ezra (1916). Dexter, Franklin Bowditch (ed.). Extracts from the Itineraries and Other Miscellanies of Ezra Stiles, D.D., LL.D., 1755–1794. New Haven: Yale University Press.
- Truman, Nathan E. (1922). "Indian Descent in New England". Americana. 16. New York: American Historical Society: 322–334.
- Updike, Wilkins (1907). A History of the Episcopal Church in Narragansett, Rhode Island (2nd ed.). Boston: Merrymount Press.
