= Canonicus =

Narragansett sachem (c. 1565–1647)

Sachem of the Narragansett
- In office by about 1600 – early 1620s Serving with Mascus

Sachem of the Narragansett
- In office early 1620s – 1643 Serving with Miantonomi (by 1632)

Sachem of the Narragansett
- In office 1643–1647 Serving with Pessicus
- Succeeded by: Pessicus and Mixanno

Personal details
- Born: c. 1565
- Died: June 4, 1647
- Children: Mixanno and at least two other sons
- Relatives: Mascus (brother); Miantonomi (nephew); Pessicus (nephew); Ninigret (nephew); Quaiapen (niece and daughter-in-law)
- Also spelled: Caunounicus, Canounicus

Canonicus (c. 1565 – June 4, 1647) (Note: Roger Williams wrote Caunounicus, Canounicus, Caunonicus and other variants (LaFantasie 1988a, p. xc). Later writers also spelled it Caunaunacus, and some gave him the different names Qunnoune or Quananone (Stiles 1916, p. 28; Drake 1841, bk. II, p. 54 n.; North American Review 1837, p. 318). A tradition repeated in late 19th century books, in a 1930 book issued by the state, and in a 1995 guide published by the University of Rhode Island, held that Conanicut Island took its name from Canonicus, who was said to have lived or spent summers there (Newport and the Resorts 1878, pp. 4–5; Inkersley 1900, p. 128; Rhode Island State Bureau of Information 1930, p. 107; Gibbs 1995, p. 44). Chapin reported the view of the philologist W. B. Cabot that many sachems' names were taken from places, so that "Canonicus thus might be derived from Conanicut", which would reverse that relationship (Chapin 1931, p. 54).) was the senior sachem of the Narragansett people of present-day Rhode Island when English colonists settled Narragansett Bay. He ruled first with his younger brother Mascus and later with Mascus's son Miantonomi. In the joint rule with his nephew, Canonicus as the elder sachem was consulted on all major decisions, while Miantonomi led the Narragansetts in war and handled most of their dealings with the colonies.

Canonicus and Miantonomi allowed the exiled minister Roger Williams to settle at the head of the bay in 1636, where he founded Providence. Williams later insisted that the land had been a gift and that Canonicus could not have been persuaded to sell it for any sum. In 1636 Canonicus satisfied the Massachusetts Bay Colony that he and Miantonomi had no part in the killing of the English trader John Oldham, and the following year the Narragansetts joined Massachusetts Bay and Connecticut in the Pequot War. He remained wary of the colonists, accusing them in 1637 of spreading disease among his people and breaking a stick into ten pieces to count for Williams the reasons he had to fear them.

After a near-fatal illness in the winter of 1637–1638, Canonicus left the colonies' negotiations to Miantonomi. When Miantonomi was executed in 1643, the aged Canonicus shared the leadership with another nephew, Pessicus, and in 1644 the two sachems placed the Narragansetts directly under King Charles I to escape the authority of Massachusetts. He died in 1647. Williams wrote that the Narragansetts buried him with honors as solemn as those the colonists had given Governor John Winthrop.

== Family and early life ==
A genealogy of the Narragansett sachems written in 1703, as copied by Ezra Stiles in 1762. It begins with Tashtassuck and runs through Canonicus, Miantonomi, Pessicus and Ninigret.

Roger Williams described Canonicus in 1643 as "about fourscore [80] yeeres old". The antiquarian Howard M. Chapin, writing in 1931, dated his birth to about 1563, and the historian Glenn W. LaFantasie, writing in 1988, to about 1565.

Narragansett tradition, recorded by English colonists, traced his family to an early sachem called Tashtassuck, but accounts of the line of descent differ. A genealogy recorded in 1703 makes Tashtassuck his grandfather: Canonicus was a child of the sachem's son and daughter, whom Tashtassuck had married to each other because he could find no partners of equal rank for them. Thomas Hutchinson, who published a version of the same oral tradition in 1764, wrote that the brother–sister marriage produced four sons, "of whom Canonicus, who was sachem when the English came, was the eldest". Chapin, drawing partly on the Mohegan sachem Uncas's claim that his grandmother's father was a Narragansett sachem named Weesoum, conjectured that more generations separated Canonicus from Tashtassuck. LaFantasie called Canonicus "probably the great-grandson" of Tashtassuck.

Accounts also differ on Canonicus's brothers and sister and their children. Williams wrote that Canonicus's nephew, the sachem Miantonomi, was the son of his youngest brother, whom other sources name as Mascus. The 1703 account mentions only one brother, the unnamed father of Miantonomi and Pessicus, and a sister. Chapin's research suggested that Canonicus had three brothers and a sister. In the 1703 account Ninigret is the sister's grandson, while Chapin and LaFantasie make her the mother of Ninigret and Quaiapen.

Canonicus had at least three sons. The eldest, Mixanno, married his cousin Quaiapen in the 1630s.

Tashtassuck
Intermediate generations
Canonicus (eldest son)	2nd son	3rd son	Mascus (youngest son) (Note: In February 1638 Roger Williams wrote of Miantonomi's "Father in law, Caunounicus his brother", then near death. The term could then mean a stepfather, and LaFantasie concludes that a brother of Canonicus had married Mascus's widow. Which brother is not known (LaFantasie 1988a, pp. 112, 145; Chapin 1931, pp. 53, 110).)	A daughter (Note: Canonicus's sister married a sachem of the Niantics whose name is not certain; Chapin suggests he may have been Sasious (Chapin 1931, p. 92).)
Mixanno	Son (died by 1643)	Son (fought in 1643)	Miantonomi	Yotaash	Pessicus	Cojonoquant	Quaiapen	Ninigret

Canonicus's family, simplified (Note: The chart follows Chapin's genealogical tables and LaFantasie's notes. Canonicus's brothers are shown in birth order: Hutchinson and Chapin make Canonicus the eldest of four sons, and Williams calls Mascus the youngest; the names of the second and third sons are not known. Canonicus's two younger sons are not in a known order. The 1703 genealogy mentions only one brother, without naming him, and makes Ninigret the sister's grandson (Chapin 1931, pp. 53–54, 63, 92, 109–110; LaFantasie 1988a, pp. 75–76, 99, 128).)

== Narragansett sachem ==
=== Joint rule ===
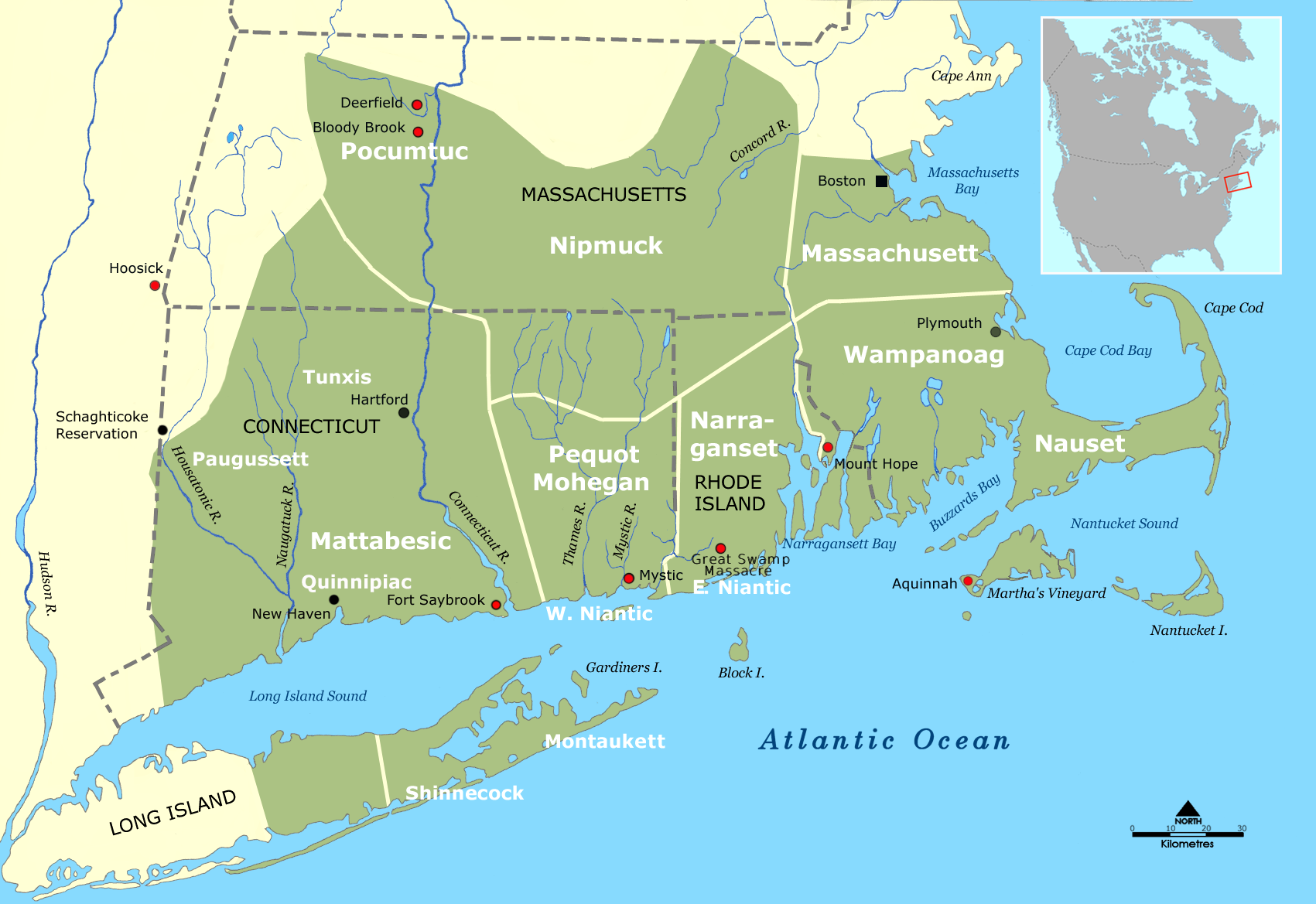
Approximate territories of the Native peoples of southern New England around 1600. Red dots mark later sites, including the Mystic and Great Swamp massacres.

By about 1600 Canonicus and his brother Mascus ruled the Narragansetts together. Their homeland was centered on present-day North and South Kingstown and Conanicut Island, on the western side of Narragansett Bay. Mascus died before the English arrived, and Canonicus appears to have held sole authority by the early 1620s. (Note: Chapin thought that the two Narragansett chiefs named by the Dutch explorer Adriaen Block in 1614 were probably Mascus and Canonicus (Chapin 1931, p. 6).) By the early 1630s he shared it with his nephew Miantonomi, who had spent his youth "under the care and protection of Canonicus". Williams, who knew both men, described the arrangement in 1643:

Their Government is Monarchicall, yet at present the chiefest government in the countrey is divided betweene a younger Sachim, Miantunnômu, and an elder Sachim, Caunoúnicus, of about fourscore [80] yeeres old, this young Mans uncle; and their agreement in the Government is remarkable. The old Sachim will not be offended at what the young Sachim doth; and the young Sachim will not doe what hee conceives will displease his Uncle.

— Roger Williams, A Key into the Language of America (1643)

The historians Julie A. Fisher and David J. Silverman see the arrangement as a division between peace and war leadership, with Canonicus overseeing affairs within the community. Williams also wrote that Miantonomi acted as Canonicus's "marshal and executioner" and did nothing "without his uncle Canonicus' consent".

The two sachems collected tribute from the smaller Native communities around the bay, among them the Cowesets, Shawomets and Pawtuxets, and according to Chapin their authority also reached the Niantics, many of the Nipmucs, the islands of the bay, Block Island and the eastern end of Long Island.

The Narragansetts largely escaped the epidemics of 1616–1619 that devastated the Wampanoags and other peoples to the east. They also controlled the bay's shellfish beds, the source of wampum, the shell beads used in trade and diplomacy. They were less fortunate in 1633–1634, when the Massachusetts Bay governor John Winthrop recorded that 700 Narragansetts had died of smallpox.

=== Plymouth and the Wampanoags, 1621–1634 ===
The Wampanoag sachem Massasoit (Ousamequin) had acknowledged Narragansett authority before the Plymouth colonists arrived. His alliance with Plymouth Colony in March 1621 was in effect a break with Canonicus. Early in 1622, after learning of the colonists' alliance with the Wampanoags, Canonicus sent Plymouth's governor, William Bradford, a bundle of arrows wrapped in a snakeskin. The historian Christine DeLucia calls it a "cautionary missive" and a signal of Narragansett power. Bradford returned the skin filled with gunpowder and shot. Chapin, noting that Canonicus refused to receive it, read the exchange as a sign that the sachem wanted to avoid war with the English.

Relations with the English were otherwise quiet for a decade. In July 1631 one of Canonicus's sons, whom Winthrop did not name, dined with him in Boston, gave him a skin and received "a fair pewter pot" in return. In April 1632 the Narragansetts attacked Massasoit at Sowams, in present-day Barrington, and Plymouth learned "that Canonicus, with a great army, was coming against them". According to Chapin, an attack by the Pequots on the western edge of Narragansett country, in land the two peoples had long disputed, forced Canonicus to withdraw.

== Roger Williams and the land grants ==
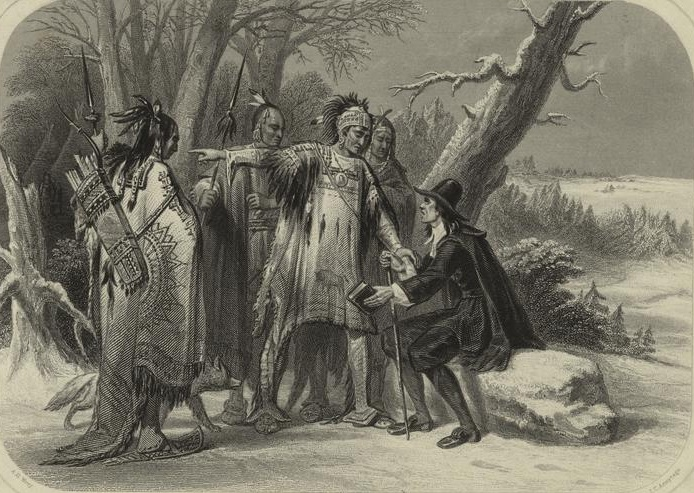
An 1856 engraving by James Charles Armytage imagining Roger Williams among the Narragansetts

Roger Williams had been sending gifts to Canonicus for some years before he left Massachusetts in 1636. After his banishment, Canonicus and Miantonomi allowed him and his followers to settle at the head of the bay, where they founded Providence. Canonicus refused any payment. He later accepted what Williams called "presents and Gratuities", and the two men constantly exchanged gifts. When the sachems confirmed the grant in writing on March 24, 1638, the deed said only that they "freely give" the land. DeLucia argues that the sachems were bringing Williams "into Native space and into a preexisting web of relations, rights, and responsibilities", not giving up the land. Fisher writes that the Narragansetts would not have permanently given up tribal land to a stranger and that Williams was in effect paying tribute for the right to live there.

Late in life, Williams defended his conduct against claims that he had bought land from the Narragansetts. Canonicus, he wrote in 1677, "was not I say to be stird with mony to sell his land to let in Foreignrs... Thouhsands Could not have bought of him Providence or Pawtuxit or Aquedenick or any other Land I had of him." He added that Canonicus "laid me out Ground for a trading howse at Nahigonset with his owne hand but he never traded with me, but had freely what he desird Goods Mony etc." The trading house stood at Cocumscussoc, now the site of Smith's Castle, on the western shore of the bay inside the Narragansett homeland.

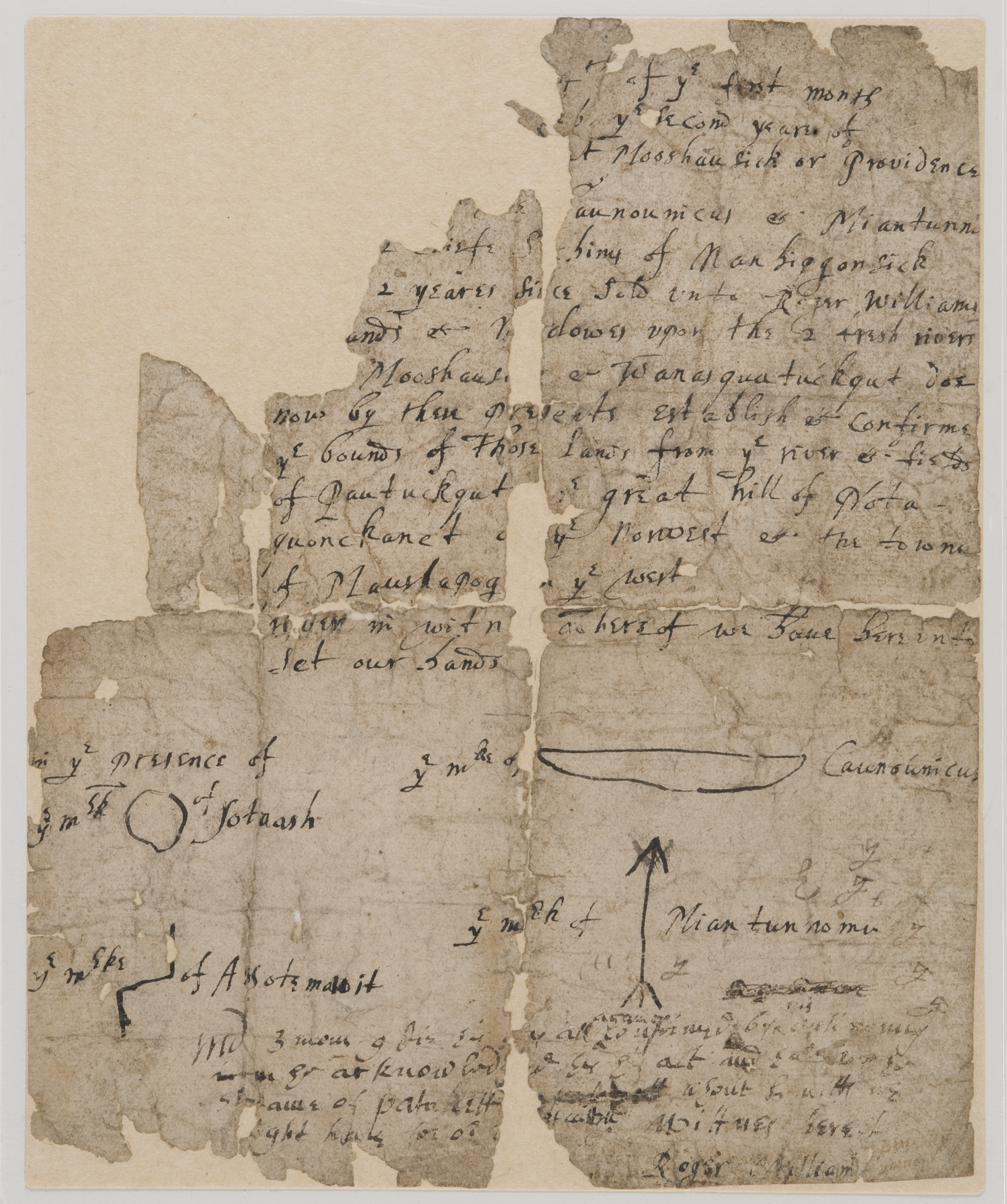
The 1638 deed in which Canonicus and Miantonomi confirmed their earlier grant to Roger Williams. Canonicus's mark is the bow beside his name; Miantonomi's is the arrow below.

The sachems made other grants to the English. In 1634 they gave the island of Chibachuweset, now Prudence Island, to the trader John Oldham, in what Chapin calls the first cession of Narragansett territory to the English. After Oldham's death they granted it jointly to Williams and Winthrop by a deed of November 10, 1637, "the yeare the Pequts were subdued", and Williams renamed it Prudence. Although Massachusetts had banished Williams, Winthrop had privately advised him to settle on Narragansett Bay, and the two stayed in close touch; during the Pequot War Williams kept Massachusetts informed of Native movements. LaFantasie writes that they became partners in the island to raise livestock there, each paying half of the price of 20 fathoms of wampum and two coats. In 1638 Canonicus and Miantonomi granted Aquidneck Island to William Coddington and other exiles from Massachusetts. Canonicus signed the deeds of these years with several different marks, including a bow and arrow.

== Oldham affair and the Pequot War ==
=== Oldham affair, 1636 ===
In July 1636 Manisseans from Block Island, who were then tributaries of the Narragansetts, killed the trader John Oldham, who had been trading with the Pequots while they were at war with the Narragansetts. Winthrop recorded a report that "all the sachems of the Narragansetts, except Canonicus and Miantunnomoh, were the contrivers of Mr. Oldham's death". (Note: Chapin calls them "lesser sachems" and "under-sachems" (Chapin 1931, p. 15). Describing the neighboring Pequots, whose organization he calls typical of the northeastern woodland peoples, the historian P. Richard Metcalf writes that besides the grand sachem there were "lesser chieftaincies over individual villages and territorial units", and that the families of the grand and lesser sachems "tended to be closely interrelated" (Metcalf 1974, p. 654).) Chapin writes that some of these lesser sachems instigated the killing, angered by that trade and perhaps jealous of Oldham's closeness to the chief sachems. Canonicus sent messengers to Winthrop to explain and apologize. Winthrop believed the messengers themselves were implicated, but "because they were sent as messengers from Canonicus, we would not imprison them". Miantonomi set out with 17 canoes and 200 men and made the Niantic sachem Wepitamock send an expedition to Block Island, which recovered Oldham's two boys and much of his property.

In August 1636 Massachusetts sent envoys to Canonicus. They reported finding in him "much state, great command over his men, and marvellous wisdom in his answers and the carriage of the whole treaty", and he cleared himself and his neighbors of the killing. The colonist Edward Johnson described the audience at Narragansett in a "State House, round about fifty foot wide, made of long poles stuck in the ground... and covered round about, and on the top with mats", where the sachem lay on a mat with his counselors around him while Miantonomi received the message "in his hearing". Johnson thought "old Canonicus... very discreet in his answers".

=== Alliance and war, 1636–1637 ===
When the Massachusett sachem Cutshamekin, serving with the Massachusetts expedition against Block Island, killed a Pequot, he sent the scalp to Canonicus. Canonicus at once sent it on to "all the Sachems about him", thanked the English and sent Cutshamekin four fathoms of wampum. The literary scholar Marie Balsley Taylor sees in this circulation among the region's allied sachems a signal that the Narragansetts would side with the English against the Pequots.

The Pequots sent envoys to Canonicus seeking a Narragansett alliance against the English. At the request of the Massachusetts authorities, Williams crossed the bay alone by canoe in a storm to the sachem's house, where for three days and nights he lodged among the Pequot envoys and argued against the alliance. He later wrote that he had helped "breake to pieces the Pequts negociation and Designe". In October 1636 Miantonomi, with two of Canonicus's sons, went to Boston and concluded an alliance with Massachusetts against the Pequots.

Canonicus remained skeptical of the Narragansetts' alliance with the colonies. When Williams visited him in late April 1637 to announce the colonists' plans for war, he found him "very sour". Canonicus "accused the English and myself for sending the plague amongst them, and threatening to kill him especially", and Williams wrote that he calmed him. In his letter reporting the visit to Governor Henry Vane and Deputy Governor Winthrop of Massachusetts, Williams described the sachem in a Latin aside as morosus aeque ac barbarus senex, "an old man, alike fretful and rude". LaFantasie writes that Canonicus was right to blame the English for the epidemic, though not in thinking they had spread it on purpose.

In the following weeks Canonicus and Miantonomi sent the English advice, through Williams, on how to fight the Pequots, recommending among other things a night attack. In late May the Connecticut captain John Mason landed his force on the western shore of the bay and asked the sachem at Narragansett, whom Chapin identifies as Canonicus, for leave to march through his country to attack the Pequots from the east. The sachem agreed but feared Mason's force was too small. Miantonomi sent 200 or 300 warriors under Wequash to join it. The Narragansetts joined the Connecticut militia and the Mohegans in the attack on the Pequot fort at Mystic on May 26, 1637, in which the English and their allies killed between 300 and 700 Pequots, most of them probably noncombatants. Many Narragansetts left before the end, and those who stayed protested to the English that their way of war "slays too many men". The war also drew in Canonicus's inland allies. In June 1637 Williams reported that some Nipmuc bands that had stayed neutral signaled their support with "divers baskets of their Nokehick [parched cornmeal] and chesnuts to Canounicus toward his wars".

Once the fighting ended, the Narragansetts and the colonists quarreled over the Pequot captives and the wampum taken from them. When Williams accused the sachems in August 1637 of taking Pequots and wampum without the governor's consent, Canonicus replied "that although he and Miantunnomu had paid many hundred fathom of wampom to their soldiers, as Mr. Governour did, yet he had not received one yard of beads nor a Pequt".

== Later years ==
=== Illness and withdrawal, 1637–1643 ===
In the winter of 1637–1638 Canonicus was gravely ill. Williams wrote in February 1638 that he had visited him "lately recovered from the pits brinck [the edge of the grave] this winter". According to Chapin, Canonicus withdrew from public affairs during 1638, and Miantonomi negotiated alone with the colonies from then on. By 1641 Miantonomi was signing land grants as chief sachem, and Chapin concluded that his uncle's mark was "no longer necessary".

Shortly before Williams sailed for England in the spring of 1643, one of Canonicus's sons died. Williams wrote that he saw "with mine owne eyes" how Canonicus, "having buried his Sonne, he burned his own Palace, and all his goods in it (amongst them to a great value) in a solemne remembrance of his sonne and in a kind of humble Expiation to the Gods, who (as they believe) had taken his sonne from him".

=== Miantonomi's death and the rule with Pessicus ===
In 1643 Miantonomi led the Narragansetts against the Mohegan sachem Uncas and was defeated and captured. Two of Canonicus's sons were among the wounded. The aged Canonicus again took a leading part in the Narragansett councils, which sent wampum to Uncas as a ransom. Miantonomi was nevertheless put to death on the orders of the commissioners of the United Colonies. Canonicus, by then frail, did not take on the leadership alone. Pessicus, Miantonomi's younger brother, then about twenty, joined him in a renewed joint rule.

=== Submission to Charles I, 1644 ===
The Messengers at the Tent of Canonicus, an 1897 engraving after Charles Stanley Reinhart of the Massachusetts envoys sent to the sachem in 1644

In 1644 the religious dissenter Samuel Gorton, whom Massachusetts had imprisoned and then released, was received at Canonicus's house. Canonicus and Pessicus told him their grievances, among them Miantonomi's execution, and Gorton, who had his own quarrel with Massachusetts, wrote and delivered a petition for them that placed the Narragansetts under the English Crown rather than the Bay Colony. On April 19, 1644, Pessicus as chief sachem, Canonicus and his son Mixanno signed an act submitting the Narragansetts and their lands to the protection of King Charles I. Canonicus signed as "Protector of that late deceased Miantonomi during the time of his nonage", that is, his guardian while he was young. The sachems asked for the king's protection from "some of His Majesty's pretended subjects", meaning Massachusetts. As princes of the country "time out of mind", they said, they could not "yield over ourselves unto any, that are subjects themselves", meaning that they would submit to the king but not to his subjects in Massachusetts.

On May 24, 1644, Canonicus and Pessicus wrote to the General Court of Massachusetts that they were now "subjects... unto the same king" as the colonists, and that neither side could judge disputes between them. DeLucia describes the submission as a deliberate strategy by which the sachems appealed over the heads of the colonies to strengthen their own position. When Massachusetts sent two messengers to ask about the letter, Canonicus "would not admit them into his wigwam for two hours, but suffered them to stay in the rain". He then received them lying on his couch, gave them only "a few froward [surly] speeches", and referred them to Pessicus.

The Narragansetts were determined to avenge Miantonomi for his execution by Uncas. In May 1645 a Narragansett force armed with thirty guns attacked the Mohegans. The United Colonies feared that if they abandoned Uncas their other Native allies would go over to the Narragansetts, so they sent soldiers to defend him and prepared for war. In August 1645 Pessicus and Mixanno, signing for his father, came to Boston expecting to negotiate. Instead the commissioners offered them a choice between war and a list of conditions. They agreed to pay 2,000 fathoms of wampum and to hand over hostages, among them Pessicus's son and nephew. Pessicus later said that "when he made his covenant he did it in fear of the Army". These children of the sachems lived among the English for more than a year, until Ninigret won their release in 1647.

== Death and burial ==
Canonicus died on June 4, 1647. Winthrop recorded: "Canonicus, the great sachem of Narragansett, died, a very old man." As he was dying he sent for Williams and asked to be buried in cloth that Williams had given him, "and so he was". Fisher sees the request as the last of the gifts by which Williams repaid the sachem for the land. In 1654, arguing against a war on the Narragansetts, Williams wrote to the General Court of Massachusetts that the Narragansetts had buried Canonicus with the same honor and solemnity that Massachusetts had shown its own governor, John Winthrop, at his death in 1649:

Their late famous longliv'd Caunounicus so liv'd and died and in the same most honble [honorable] manner and sollemnitie (in their Way) as You laid to sleepe Your Prudent Peacemaker Mr Wintrop, did they honour this their Prudent and Peaceable Prince. His Son Meiksah inherites his Spirit.

No contemporary account says where he was buried. The antiquarian Sidney S. Rider placed his home and death near Cocumscussoc.

After his death Pessicus and Mixanno tried to keep up the joint rule, but LaFantasie writes that they did so "in name only" and relied on Ninigret for advice in dealing with the English.

== Character and reputation ==
Williams, who knew Canonicus for more than a decade, left the fullest picture of him. He called him "a wise and peaceable Prince" and recorded a speech Canonicus made to him "in a solemne assembly":

I have never suffered any wrong to be offered to the English since they landed: nor never will... if the Englishman speake true, if hee meane truly, then shall I goe to my grave in peace, and hope that the English and my posteritie shall live in love and peace together.

— Canonicus, as recorded by Roger Williams, A Key into the Language of America (1643)

When Williams answered that Canonicus had no cause to doubt the English, the sachem "tooke a stick and broke it into ten pieces, and related ten instances (laying downe a stick to every instance) which gave him cause thus to feare".

LaFantasie writes that Canonicus "resisted white encroachments" from the beginning of English settlement. He refused to trade with Williams, though he often accepted his presents and asked the authorities of Massachusetts for English goods. Williams admitted that the sachem had made many demands on him over the years. Fisher writes that Canonicus, like other leading sachems, opposed Christian missions. Some of the communities that paid tribute to him saw a mission as a way to gain English backing, and with it a way to stop paying tribute.

== Later use of the name ==
Sachems sometimes changed their names, often at major ceremonies. In the 1670s Canonicus's nephew Pessicus, also called Moosup, took his uncle's name. A deed of May 1, 1675, for Rose Island is signed by "Connonicus formerly called Maussopp chief sachim of the Narragansett". This later Canonicus led the Narragansetts who sought peace during King Philip's War and was killed by Mohawks in June 1676. Some writers have confused the two men.

== Commemoration ==
Memorials to Canonicus
1. North Burial Ground: memorial boulder, 1883 (base remains)
2. Canonicus Square: boulder moved here, 1980s; missing since about 1995
3. Neutaconkanut Hill: Canonicus Boulder (blasted 1954)
4. Devil's Foot Rock: marker, 1924
5. East Ferry, Jamestown: relief, 1941

The dedication of the Canonicus memorial in the North Burial Ground, September 21, 1883

On September 21, 1883, the Rhode Island Historical Society dedicated a granite boulder to Canonicus in the North Burial Ground in Providence. The stone, about five feet high, had been found by workmen digging a sewer on South Main Street and was carved with his name and a bow and arrow. (Note: The bow and arrow on the boulder were copied from what was presented as a facsimile of Canonicus's mark on the 1638 Providence deed, printed in William R. Staples's Annals of the Town of Providence. On the original deed his mark is a rough bow alone, and the arrow below it is Miantonomi's (Canonicus Memorial 1883, p. 29; Chapin 1931, p. 32). Canonicus did not use a single fixed mark. He signed with a bow on the Providence and Prudence Island deeds and with a bow and arrow on the Aquidneck deed of 1638 and a receipt of 1639. On the submission of April 1644 his mark is an upright line rising from a horizontal one (Canonicus Memorial 1883, pp. 29–30; Chapin 1931, p. 58).) Two Narragansetts took part: Moses B. Prophet unveiled the stone, and a girl, Annie A. Thomas, presented flowers on behalf of the tribe. The organizers tied the memorial to "the late formal dissolution of the Narragansett tribe", which Rhode Island had declared in 1880. The historian Jean M. O'Brien and the archaeologist Patricia E. Rubertone write that no Narragansett spoke at the ceremony, and O'Brien places it among New England commemorations that presented Native peoples as vanishing while they continued as distinct communities. In the 1980s local business owners had the boulder moved to Hoyle Square, a once-busy Providence intersection that city records call Canonicus Square, as a centerpiece for reviving the area. Only its stone base, now covered by an earthen mound, remains at the North Burial Ground. The boulder was knocked over by a car around 1995 and has been missing since.

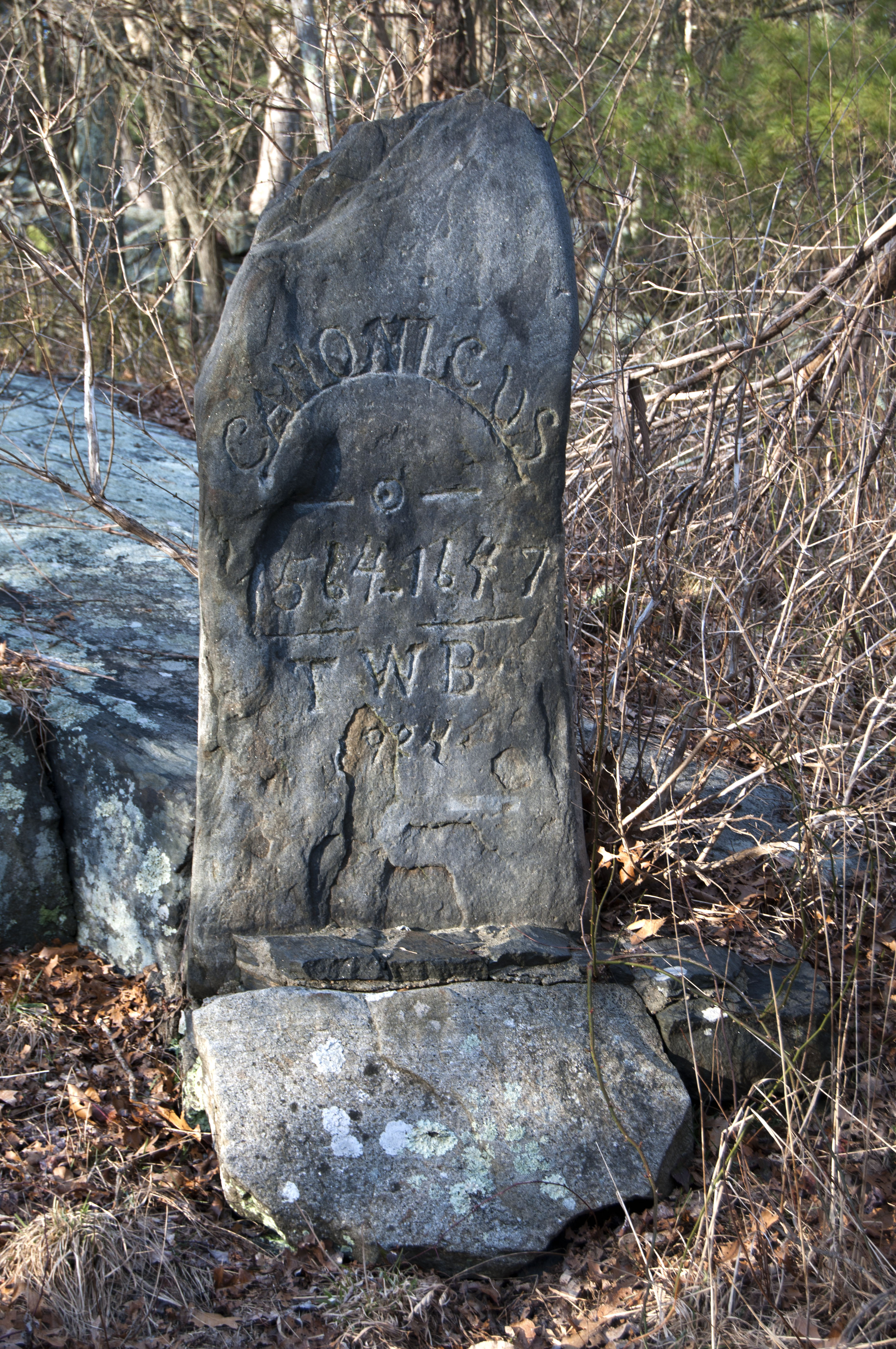
The 1924 marker to Canonicus at Devil's Foot Rock, North Kingstown

In 1924 a marker to Canonicus was placed at Devil's Foot Rock in North Kingstown. A state survey describes it as placed "to note the legendary grave of the sachem Canonicus" nearby.

John Carbone's monument at East Ferry, Jamestown: the relief of Canonicus and Roger Williams (left) and the inscription on the back (right)

In 1941 the state offered the town of Jamestown a granite relief by the Rhode Island sculptor John Carbone showing Canonicus and Roger Williams, commissioned to mark Williams's 1636 meeting with the Narragansett sachems during the Pequot negotiations. The town accepted it on December 10, 1941, and it stands at East Ferry. The inscription on the back states that the two men met on Conanicut Island. The historians Rosemary Enright and Sue Maden write that where the meeting took place is not known.

A large glacial boulder on Neutaconkanut Hill, which marked the northwestern bound of the land granted to Williams, was known by 1909 as the Canonicus Boulder. Local tradition held that he had used it as a lookout. After Hurricane Carol weakened its support in 1954, its owner, the Providence Journal Company, had it blasted apart. The remains, on the hill's south slope in Johnston, are marked on trail maps as the Exploded Canonicus Boulder.

The United States Navy has given his name to four ships. The first was the Civil War monitor USS Canonicus, launched in Boston in 1863, and the last an auxiliary minelayer that received the name in 1955. The passenger steamer Canonicus, which in the late 19th century ran between Providence, Newport and Block Island, was also named for him.

Camp Canonicus, a Baptist camp and conference center of about 300 acres on the Exeter–North Kingstown line, stands on property the Rhode Island Baptist State Convention bought in 1946. In 1950 it was renamed in honor of Canonicus, "the Narragansett sachem who befriended Williams", the founder of the First Baptist Church in America. The camp had no campers after 2021, and in 2024 the American Baptist Churches of Rhode Island decided to sell it. In 2026 it was sold to Canonicus Ministries, a new Baptist nonprofit, which planned to reopen it.

Canonicus and Miantonomi were inducted into the Rhode Island Heritage Hall of Fame in 1997.

== See also ==
- Miantonomi
- Narragansett people
- Roger Williams
- Sachems' Deed
