= Narragansett-Montaukett War =

The Narragansett-Montaukett War
- Part of the American Indian Wars
| Date | 1653–1657 |
| Location | Long Island |
| Result | Indecisive |

Belligerents
| Niantic; Narragansett; Pequots | Montaukett; Shinnecock; New England Confederation |

Commanders and leaders
| Ninigret; Pessicus | Wyandanch; Poggatacut (sachem); Mandush |

Strength
| Unknown | Unknown |

Casualties and losses
| Unknown | Unknown |

The Narragansett-Montaukett war was an armed conflict which began in 1653 and lasted to 1657 between the allies of the Niantic Sachem Ninigret and the Long Island tribes who were under the protection of the New England Confederation.

== Background ==
Niantic Sachem Ninigret allegedly held a grudge against Shinnecock Sachem Mandush due to an unspecified past transgression. This feud led to Ninigret sending a warrior to live among the Shinnecock for a year to be able to assassinate Mandush in secret. The assassins pistol misfired and his attempt on the Sachems life was a failure. Sachems Wyandanch and Mandush then brought the assassin to Hartford to be executed and his body burned.

== War ==
Ninigret retaliated after the death of his warrior by launching a series of raids on the Montauketts. Many Montaukett warriors allegedly died after being sent to retaliate against the Niantic on Block Island and again after this action triggered a reprisal attack against a Montaukett fort at Fort Pond Bay that led to a great battle.

In 1653, Narragansetts under Ninigret attacked and burned the Montaukett village to demand they pay tribute, killing 30 and capturing 14 prisoners, including Chief Wyandanch's daughter. The daughter was recovered with the aid of Lion Gardiner (who in turn was given a large portion of Smithtown, New York in appreciation). The Montauketts, ravaged by smallpox and fearing extermination by the Narragansetts, were provided temporary refuge by white settlers in East Hampton, setting up their wigwams alongside the townhouses.

As the Montauketts had placed themselves under the protection of the New England colonists. The colonists sent military supplies to the towns of Easthampton and Southampton. They also stationed an armed vessel in the sound under the command of John Youngs, with orders to wreck Ninigret's canoes and destroy his forces if he attempted to land on the Island.

In September 1654, the Connecticut colonists demanded that Ninigret appear in Hartford and deliver tribute which had been long overdue. Ninigret refused to appear. The Massachusetts Bay Colony then declared war against him and sent 270 infantry and 40 horsemen under the command of Major Simon Willard to confront Ninigret. Willard's instructions were to go to Ninigret's quarters, demand the tribute, and insist that he end the war against the Long Island Indians. On the approach of the troops, Ninigret fled to a distant swamp and was not pursued, but the Pequots who had been under his command were apprehended and given to Harmon Garrett to oversee.

== Aftermath ==
The raids against the Montauketts continued until 1657 at which the tribe was in a much weaker state. The Montauketts continued to stay with the English until the winter of 1661–1662 when they decided it was safe to return to their homes. As gratitude, they gave away a section of the peninsula to the English known as Hither Woods.
