= Wequash Cooke =

Niantic leader and Christian missionary (died 1642)

- Wequash Cook, Weekwash, Weekwosh, or Wequashcuk

Pequot leader

Personal details
- Died: 1642
- Relations: Uncle, Ninigret

Wequash Cooke (also known as Wequash Cook or Weekwash or Weekwosh or Wequashcuk) (died 1642) was one of the earliest Native American converts to Protestant Christianity, and, as a sagamore, played an important role in the 1637 Pequot War in New England.

== Early life ==
Wequash lived in Pasquishunk near the mouth of the Connecticut River and was the eldest son of Wepitanock, the sachem of the Niantic people and many historians presume that Wequash's mother was a Pequot because she was described as a "stranger" and not Niantic. Wequash was also a nephew of Chief Ninigret. In 1637 Wequash and Uncas united with the colonists of New England under Captain John Mason to fight the Pequots and witnessed the destruction of the tribe's fort by Connecticut militia and Indian allies during the Mystic massacre in Mystic, Connecticut. After the War, Wequash married many of the powerful Pequot women in an attempt to solidify his power. Wequash later deeded the land for the settlement of Guilford, Connecticut, to Henry Whitfield in 1641 in a deed in which "Weeksosh of Pasquishunk" deeded land "given him by Sachem Squaw of Quillipiag."

== Conversion and death ==
After the Pequot War, as local historians observed, that Wequash was filled with "respect for English power" and "it awakened a spirit of inquiry in regard to the Englishmen's God, which led him finally to a hearty and influential reception of Christianity". After this experience, Wequash returned to local Native Americans as a missionary preaching about Christ for which he was persecuted by them. Wequash's tombstone in Lyme, Connecticut, refers to him as New England's first Indian convert. Many Puritans in Massachusetts such as Governor John Winthrop wrote about Wequash's conversion as the first Native American conversion to Christianity, and New England's First Fruits was published in 1643 describing Wequash's experience. This was later used to justify the Massachusetts Bay Colony's existence as a mission in evangelizing to Native Americans. In A Key Into the Language of America Roger Williams spoke more skeptically of Wequash's conversion and described how on his deathbed Wequash thanked Williams for explaining Christianity to him at his home in Providence, but Williams still had concerns about whether Wequash had truly been converted. Wequash died in 1642 in the home of Colonel George Fenwick, co-founder of the Saybrook Colony, and there were suspicions that Wequash had been poisoned for his relationship with the English. He was "buried in the Christian Indian burying ground on the west side of the bay near the mount of the Niantic river." Prior to his death Wequash requested that his son Wequash be raised by the English settlers, and his son, Wenamoag, went to live with Colonel George Fenwick in the Saybrook Fort, but it is unknown what happened to him after Fenwick's wife died and Fenwick returned to England in 1645. Wequash's younger brother, Harman Garrett (Cashawashett), took the name "Wequash Cooke II" for a period after Wequash's death and attempted to assume his leadership role.

== See also ==
- Pequot War
