= Wepitanock =

Eastern Niantic chief sachem

Eastern Niantic leader

Chief Sachem

Personal details
- Died: after 1651
- Relations: siblings: Quaiapen, Ninigret
- Children: Harman Garrett, Wequash Cooke

Wepitanock (also known as Momojosbuck or Wettamozo or Aquawoce) (died after 1651) was an Eastern Niantic chief sachem in the area around Rhode Island and Connecticut.

Wepitanock was likely Canonicus' nephew and was the older brother of Ninigret with whom he shared power. His sister was Queen Quaiapen. Wepitanock had at least one wife (whose name is unknown but who may have been a Pequot as she is referred to as a "stranger"). Roger Williams describes Wepitanock as Miantonomi's brother-in-law. Wepitanock had at least four sons and one daughter, who married her uncle Ninigret. Wepitanock's sons were Harman Garrett and Wequash Cooke and Tomtico and another unnamed son who died in 1650 according to Roger Williams. After Wepitanock's death Ninigret contested the claims to power of Wepitanock's sons because they were only half Niantic.
