= Nehantic Trail =

Hiking trail in Connecticut, United States

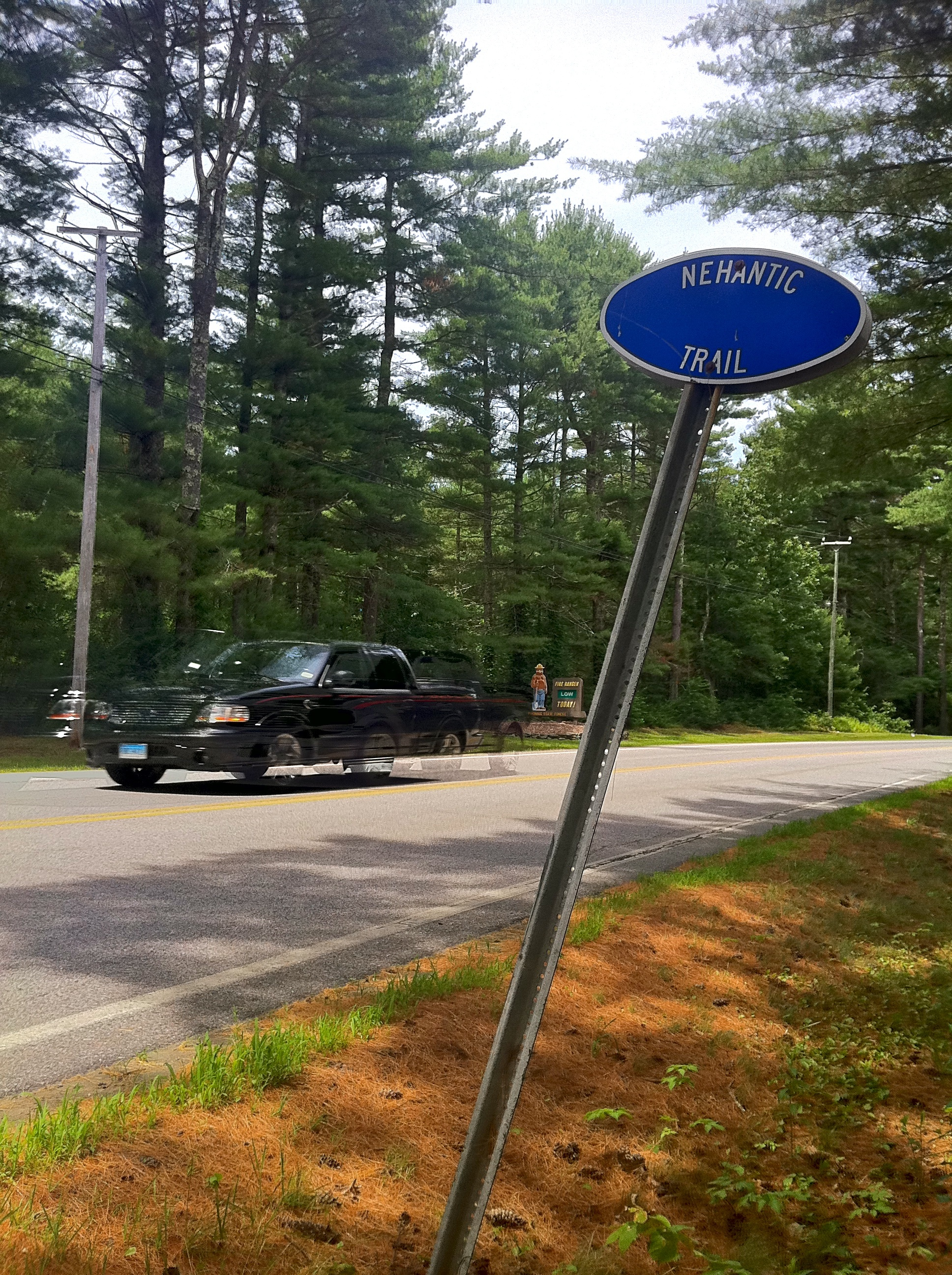
- Nehantic Trail sign at CT State Route 49 Crossing.
- Length: 13 miles (21 km)
- Location: Connecticut, U.S.
- Designation: CFPA Blue-Blazed Trail
- Use: Hiking, running, cross-country skiing, snowshoeing
- Hazards: Hunters, deer ticks, poison ivy

The Nehantic Trail is a 13-mile (21 km) hiking trail in the U.S. state of Connecticut, and is one of the Blue-Blazed hiking trails maintained by the Connecticut Forest and Park Association.

The trail is located in the towns of Voluntown and Griswold and is almost entirely within the Pachaug State Forest.

== Trail description ==
The Nehantic Trail is a Blue-Blazed hiking trail and extends from Green Falls Pond in Voluntown to the Hopeville Pond State Park in Griswold. Most of the Nehantic Trail is on state land within the Pachaug State Forest and connects three public recreation areas maintained by the Connecticut Department of Environmental Protection: Hopeville Pond State Park, the Chapman Recreation Area and the Green Falls Pond Recreation Area. Each of these recreation areas provide seasonal camping, and public swimming areas are available at the Green Falls and Hopeville Ponds.

Much of the Nehantic Trail is flat or has gradual ascents and descents and is suitable for casual walking or hiking, running - or snowshoeing in the winter. The steepest section is where the trail traverses Mt Misery. All trails in this area cross streams and wetland areas that are subject to flooding in periods of significant rain and snow melt.

The trail overlaps with or connects to other Blue-Blazed trails in the Pachaug Forest: the Pachaug Trail in the Mt Misery section, and the Narragansett Trail at Green Falls Pond. The Nehantic-Pachaug Crossover trail is a secondary trail in the Green Falls Pond section connecting these two trails and is marked with blue and red blazes (a blue blaze with a red bar in the lower half of the blaze). The Laurel Loop is another secondary trail in this area and is marked with blue and yellow blazes. This side-trail features extensive growths of Mountain Laurel and is well worth hiking in early Summer when these shrubs are in bloom.

=== Trail route ===
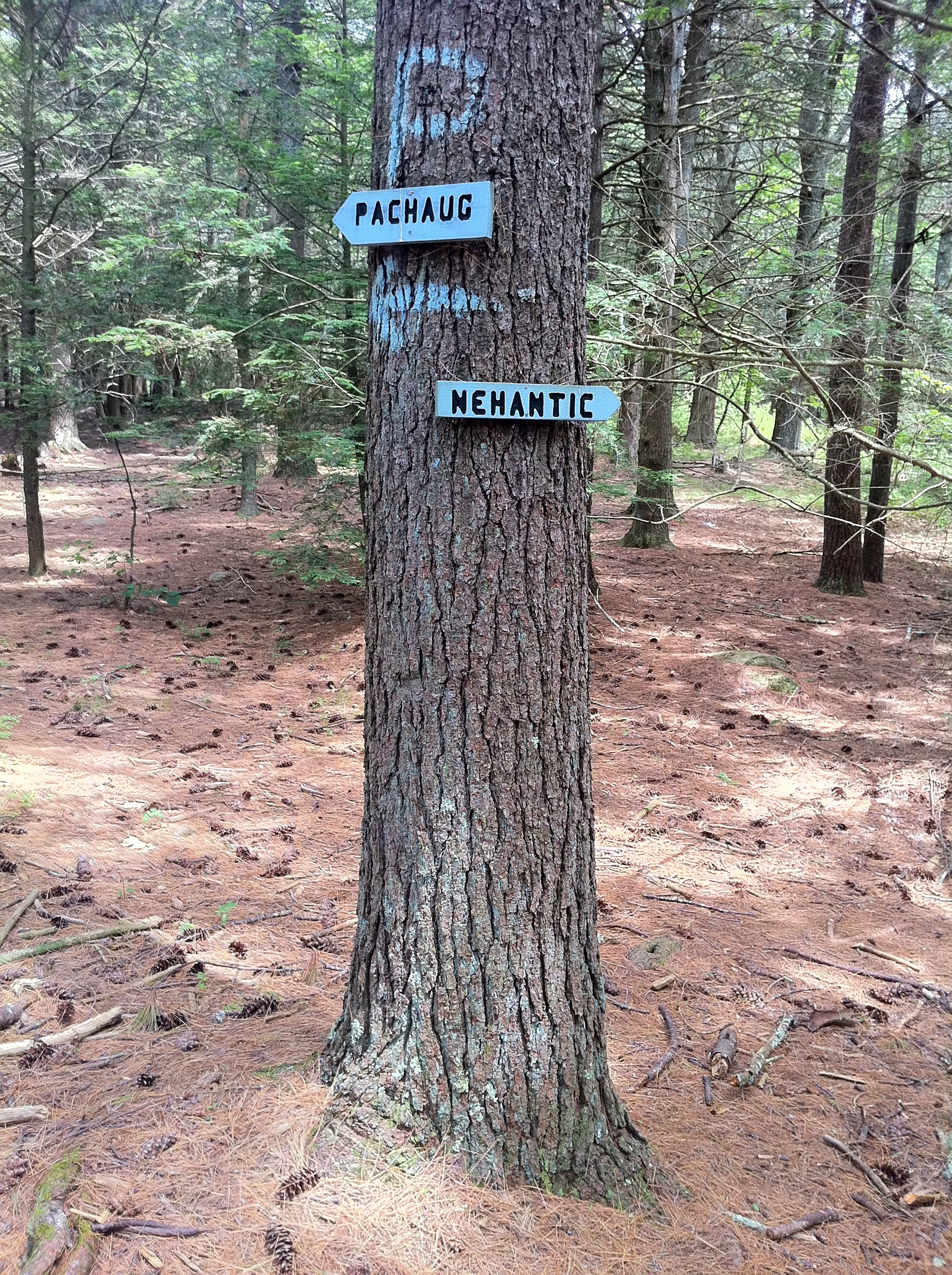
Nehantic & Pachaug shared trail portion's eastern junction.

The southern end of the Nehantic Trail starts in the Green Falls Pond Recreation Area, near the swimming and camping areas and the start of the Pachaug trail. The trail leads generally north, connecting with the Nehantic-Pachaug Crossover trail and then crossing Rts 138/165 to the west of the Voluntown center. The trail continues through woods and then joins Rt 49 for a section before entering the Chapman Recreation Area. The trail continues through woods and then joins with the Pachaug Trail where they pass over the top of Mt Misery (41.5887°N 71.8730°W). The two trails diverge west of the Mt Misery "summit", with the Nehantic continuing north through woods before crossing Rt 201 to the Hopeville Pond State Park.

The Nehantic-Pachaug Crossover runs East-West and joins the Nehantic Trail just south of where it crosses the access road to the Green Falls Pond area and connects to the Pachaug and Laurel Loop Trails at the Eastern Terminus. The Laurel Loop runs to the north from there and loops back to the section of the State Forest where access roads from Rt 49 and Rts 138/165 join together.

The connecting main and side trails provide numerous opportunities for loop hikes. Since parking is available at each of the recreation areas (subject to State DEP fees in peak season), extended through-hikes are also popular on this trail.

=== Trail communities ===
The Nehantic Trail passes through land located within the following municipalities, from south to north: Voluntown, Connecticut and Griswold, Connecticut

== Landscape, geology, and natural environment ==
Landscape in the area is generally low-lying and flat with some rolling hills. The most prominent ascent is Mt Misery in the Chapman / Mt Misery Recreation Area, with an ascent of 100 feet or so to an elevation of 440 feet. This is one of the higher elevations in the area so the peak offers good views of the forest to the south.

The Pachaug Forest features large extents of undeveloped land, consisting of mature growths of hardwood and evergreens, along with swampy areas having extensive coverage by Mountain Laurel and other shrubs and smaller trees.

== History and folklore ==
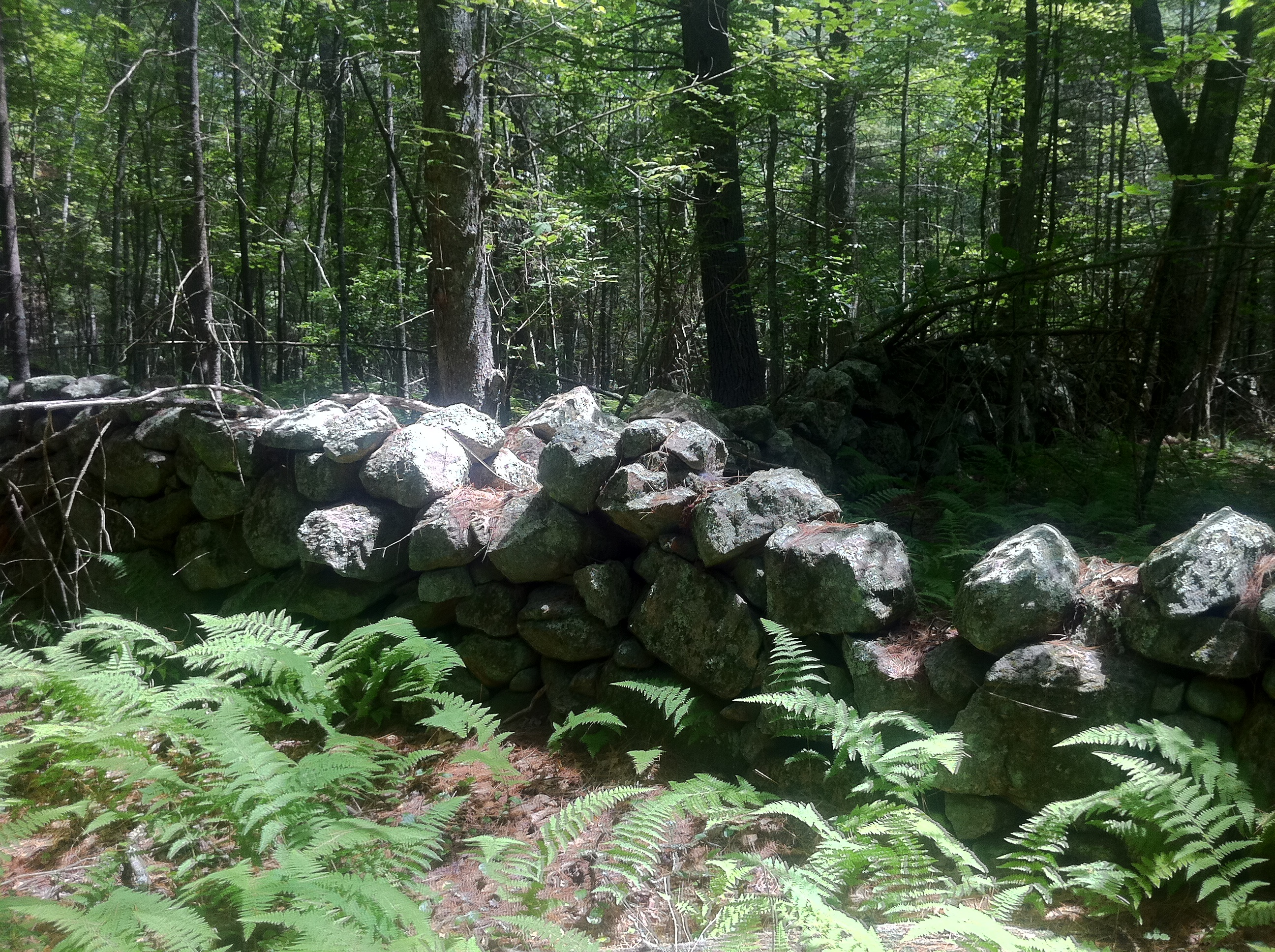
Stone fence near Nehantic Trail & Nehantic-Pachaug Crossover Trail intersection.

The Blue-Blazed Nehantic Trail was created by the Connecticut Forest and Park Association as part of the Blue-Blazed Hiking Trail system.

=== Origin and name ===
The original Blue-Blazed Hiking Trails were named after Native American people and place names, in recognition that many of the trails followed historic footpaths. Trails added since often follow this convention, so many of the BBHT's have Native American names. The Niantic people or Nehantic is one of several Algonquian speaking people occupying the shoreline of Southern New England in the early colonial period of the region. The name is also used for the Nehantic State Forest as well as the borough of Niantic in East Lyme.

=== Historic sites ===
No historical sites have been identified along the route. Stone walls indicate that much of the landscape was used for settlements and farms. Stone foundations and extensive stone walls can be found in a section of the Nehantic-Pachaug Crossover.

=== Folklore ===
The town name of Voluntown is attributed to the fact that it was settled by Volunteers of the Narragansett War in 1700 who received land grants to settle there. The land was remote and difficult to farm and many of the original settlements were subsequently abandoned, so stone walls and foundations can be found throughout the forest today. The in-hospitality of the land has been cited as the origin for the names "Mount Misery" or "Misery Hill" and "Hell Hollow".

== Hiking the trail ==
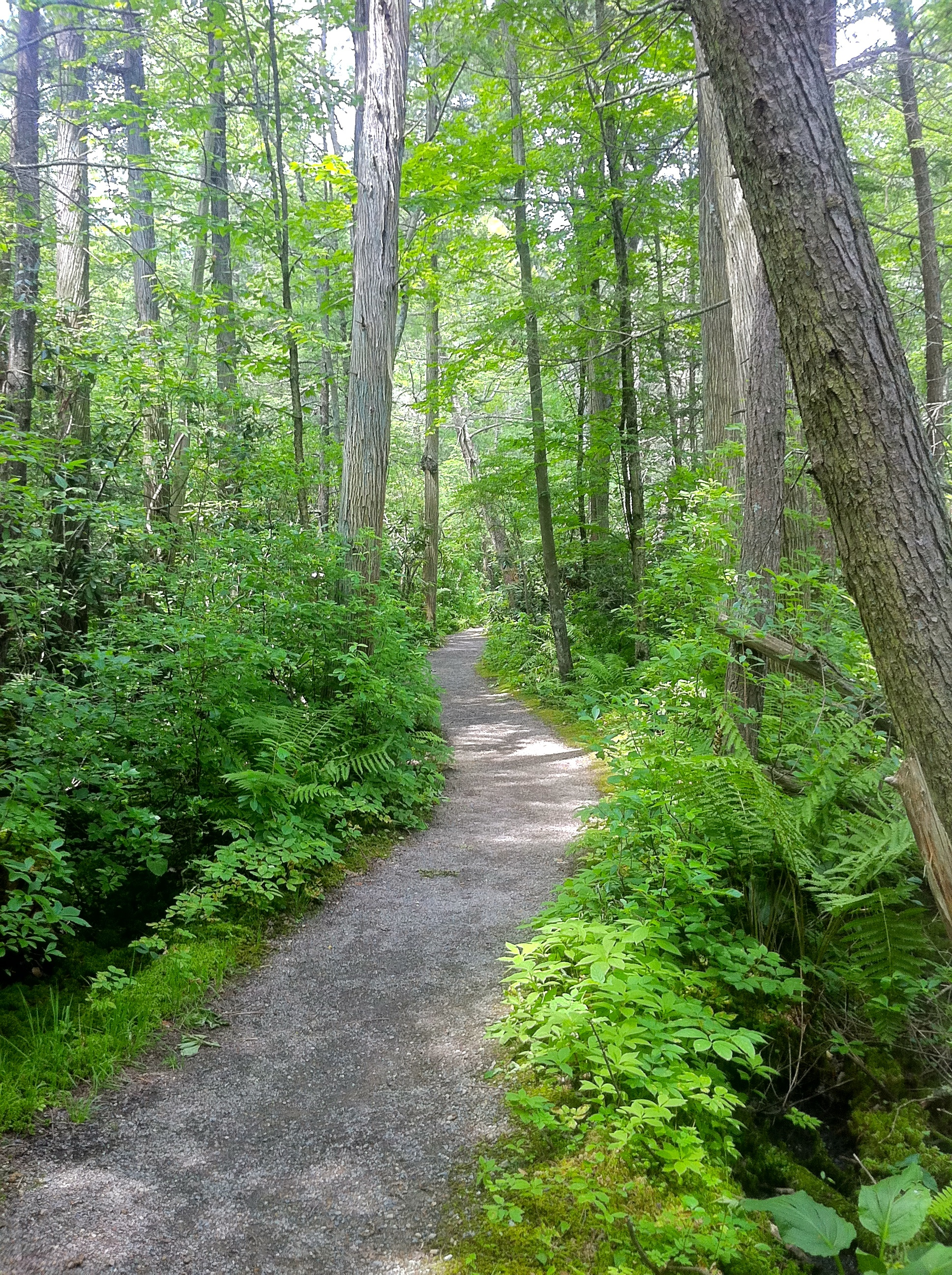
Rhododendron Sanctuary side trail begins off of the Nehantic Trail.

The mainline trail is blazed with blue rectangles. Trail descriptions are available from a number of commercial and non-commercial sources, and a complete guidebook is published by the Connecticut Forest and Park Association. More information can be found on the CFPA website (http://ctwoodlands.org/blue-blazed-hiking-trails) including updates on trail conditions and closure or restrictions. Contact information is also available on the site for trail users to report adverse trail conditions or submit other feedback or questions.

Weather along the route is typical of Connecticut. Conditions on exposed ridge tops and summits may be harsher during cold or stormy weather. Lightning is a hazard on exposed summits and ledges during thunderstorms. Snow is common in the winter and may necessitate the use of snowshoes. Ice can form on exposed ledges and summits, making hiking dangerous without special equipment.

Landscape is low-lying and trails cross wetland areas. Extensive rain and snow melt will lead to wet and muddy conditions, and in this case fairly high waterproof boots are recommended.

Biting insects can be bothersome during warm weather. Parasitic deer ticks (which are known to carry Lyme disease) are a potential hazard. Encounter with small wildlife is always possible and hikers should be alert to signs of erratic behavior or other disease symptoms and take evasive action if warranted.

Seasonal hunting is permitted on state forest land, so wearing bright orange clothing during the hunting season (Fall through December) is advised.

State regulations govern use of state forest land. The land, plants and animals should generally be left undisturbed, especially endangered and protected species.

== Image gallery ==
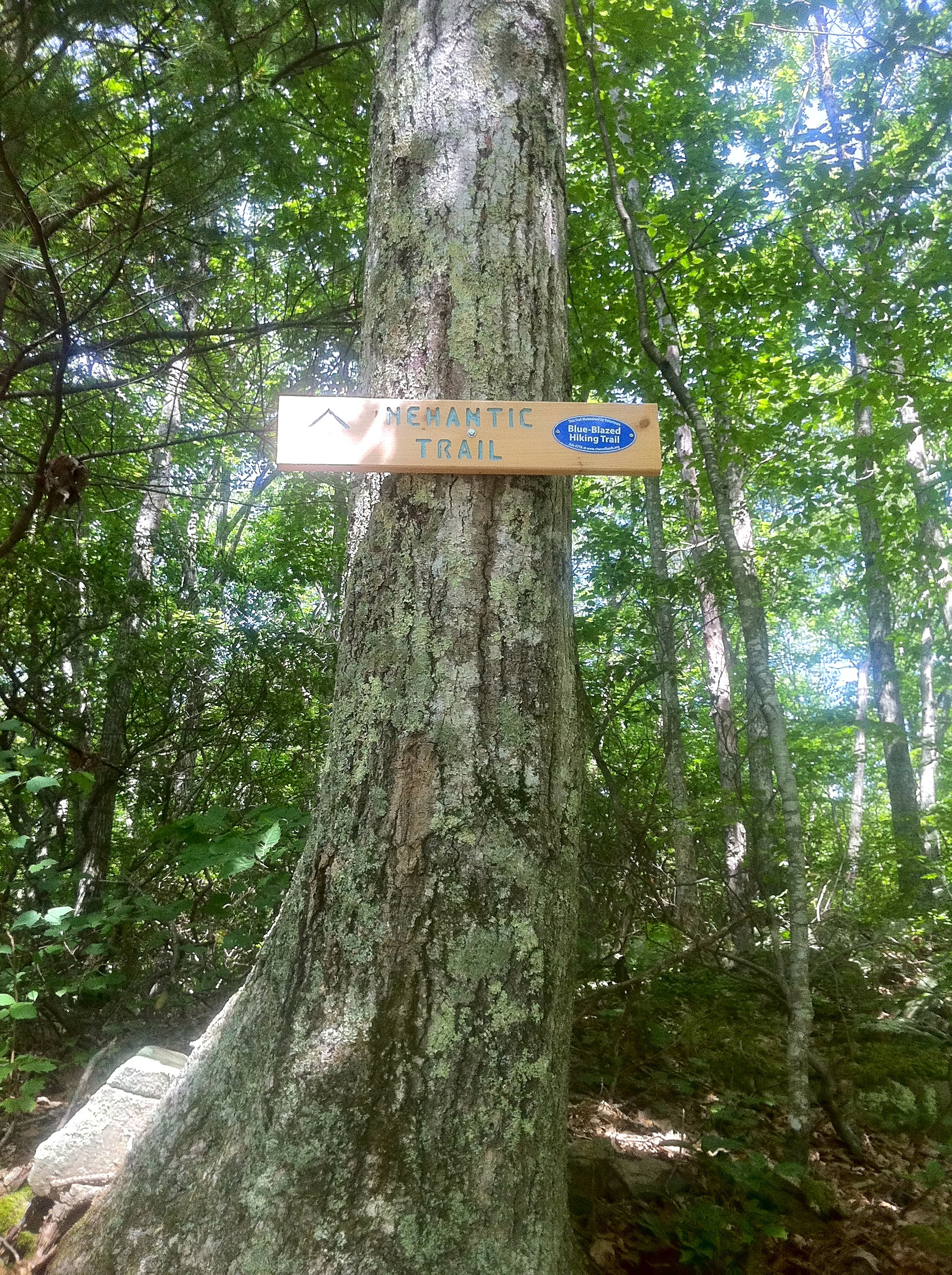
Nehantic Trail sign on Green Falls Rd at southeastern trailhead

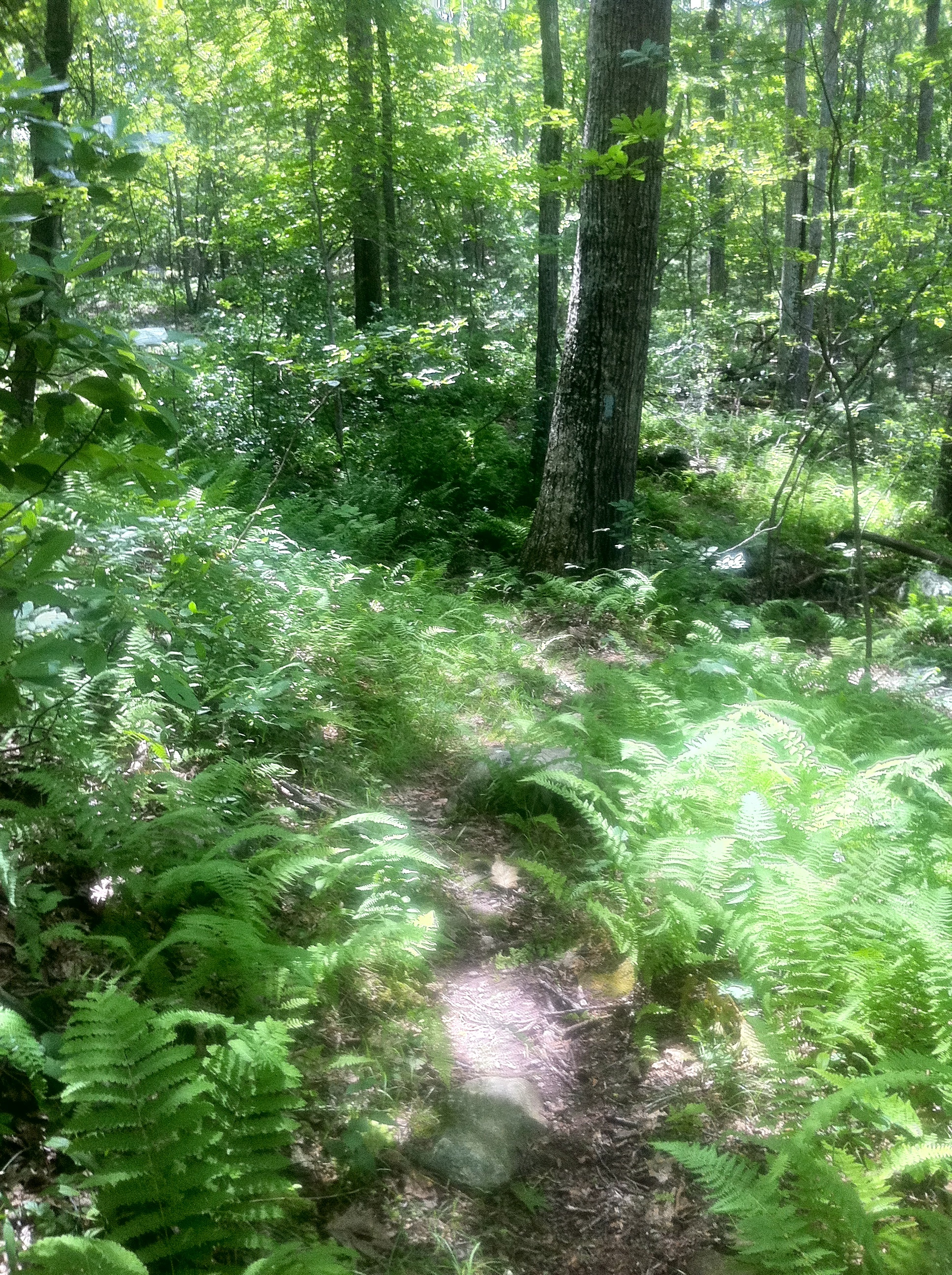
Nehantic Trail off Green Falls Rd near southeastern trailhead.

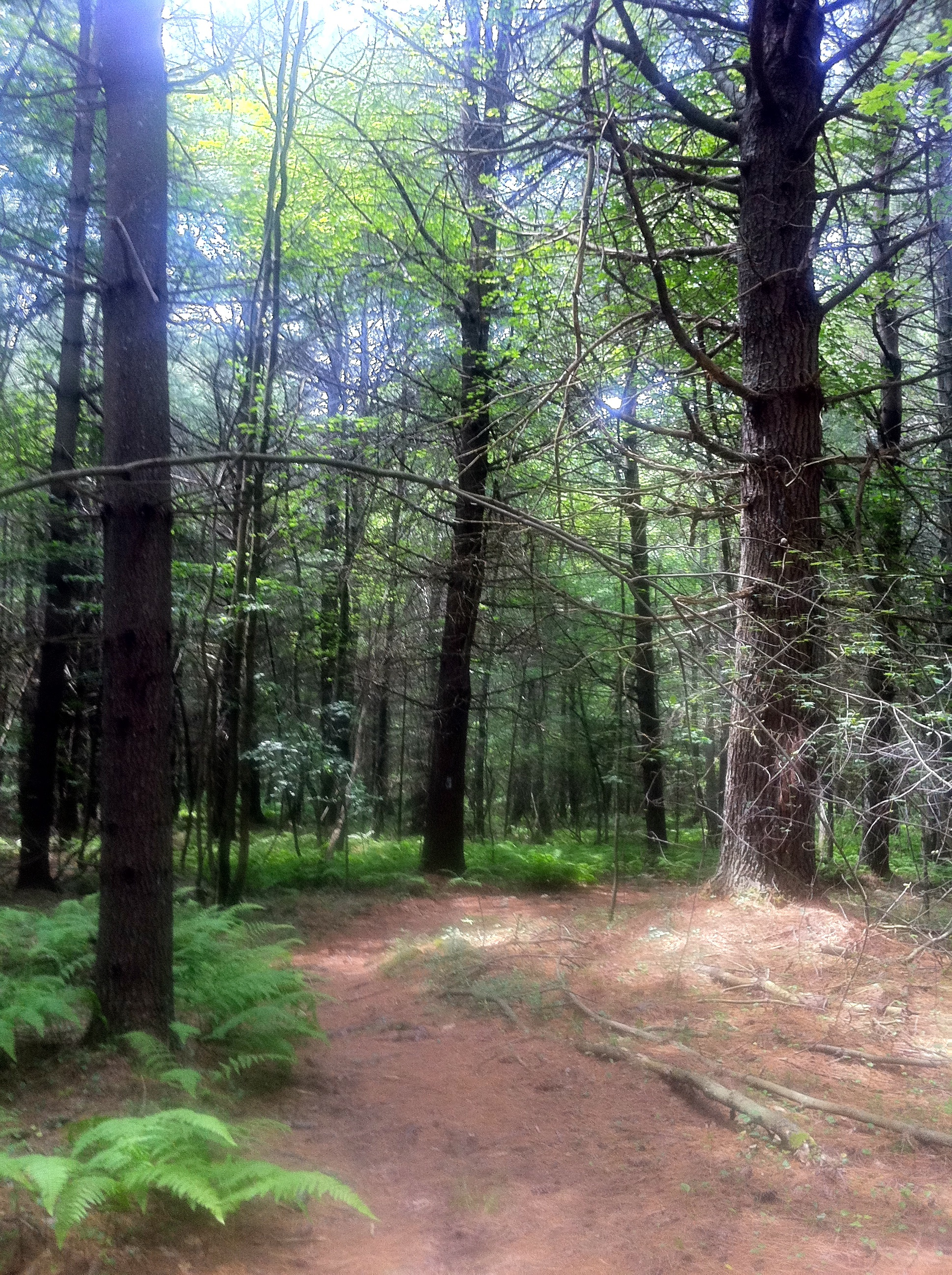
Nehantic Trail off Green Falls Rd in Pachaug State Forest.

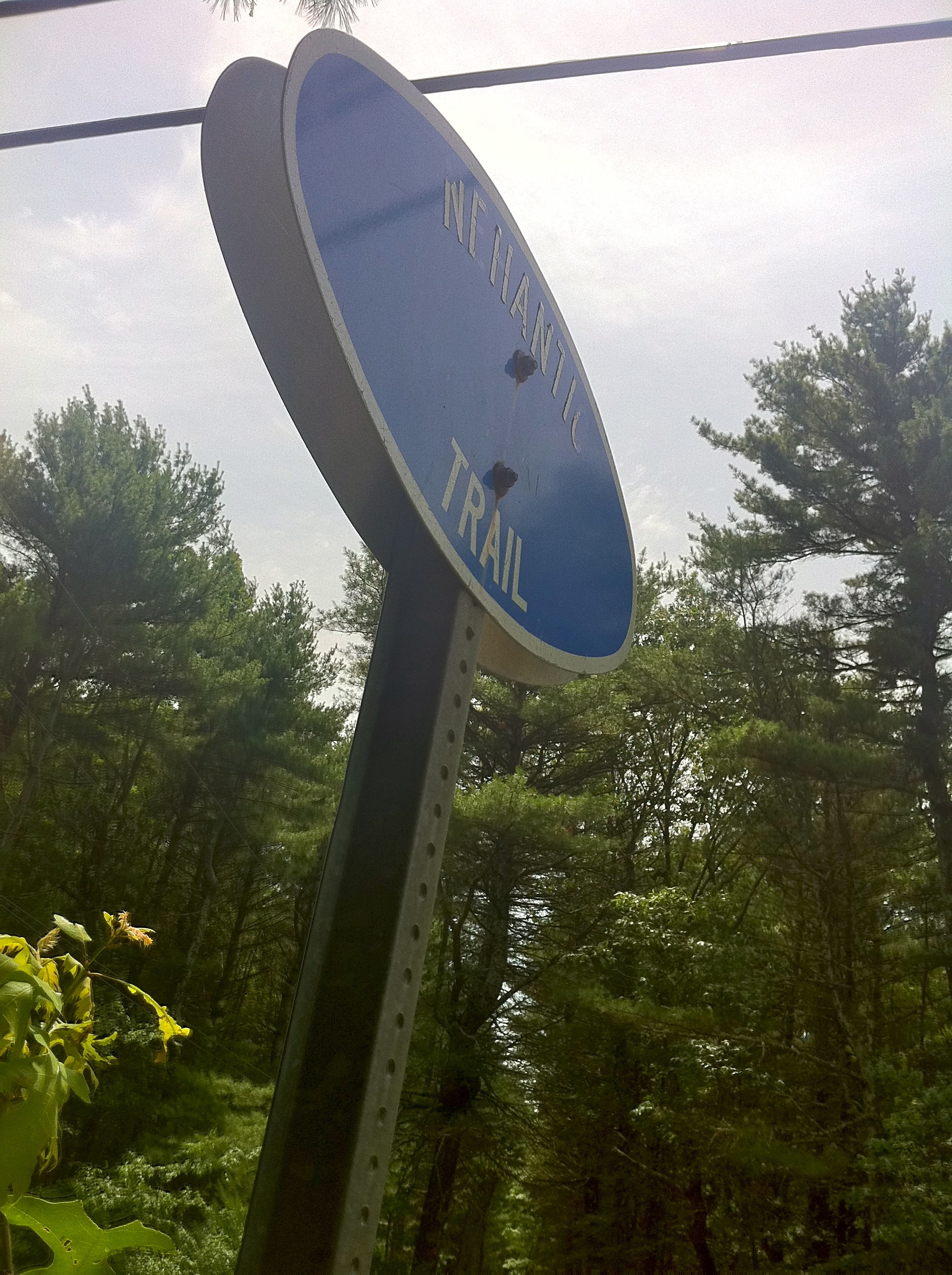
Nehantic Trail sign at CT State Route 138 Crossing.

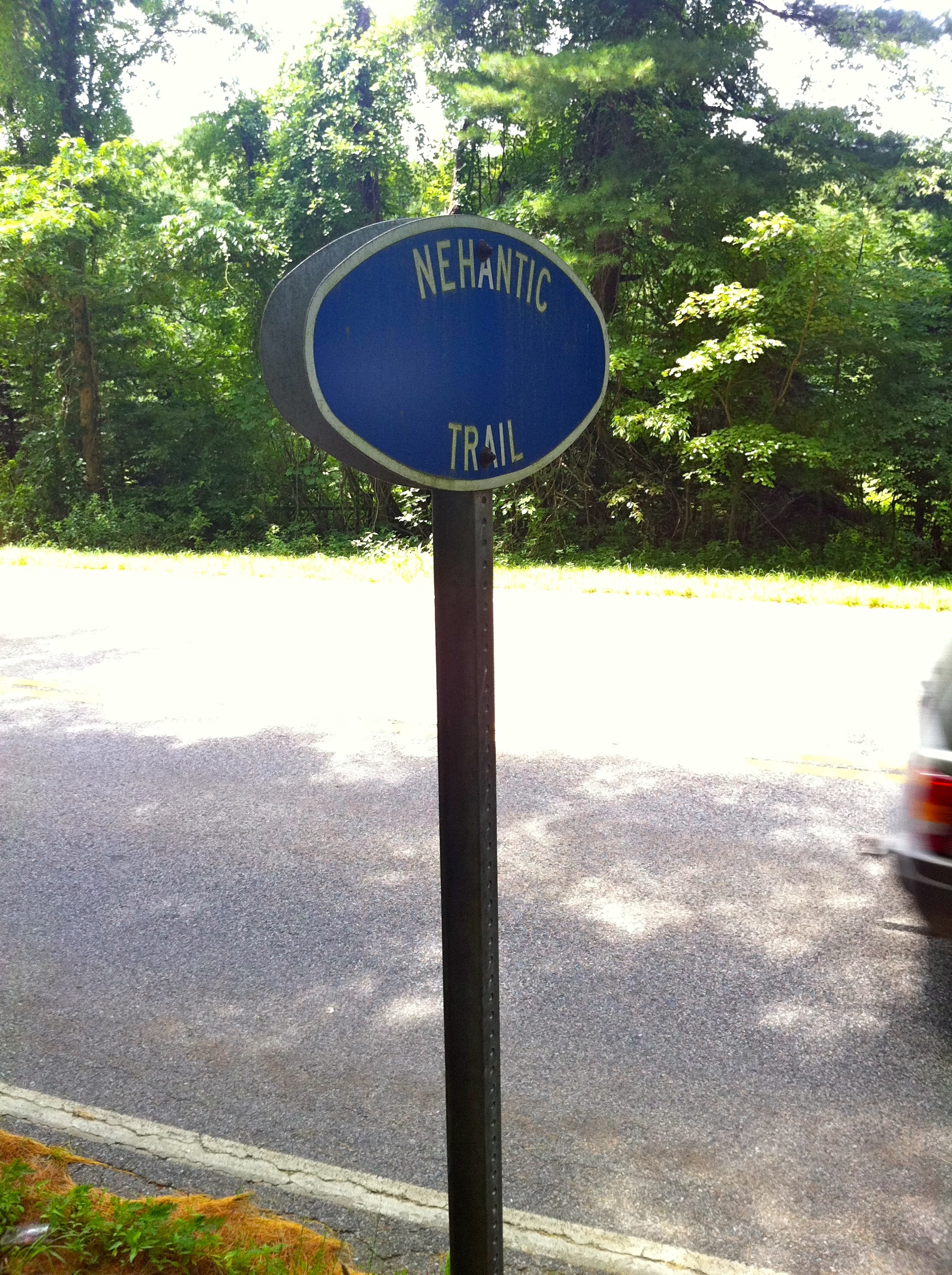
Nehantic Trail sign at Shetucket Turnpike Crossing.

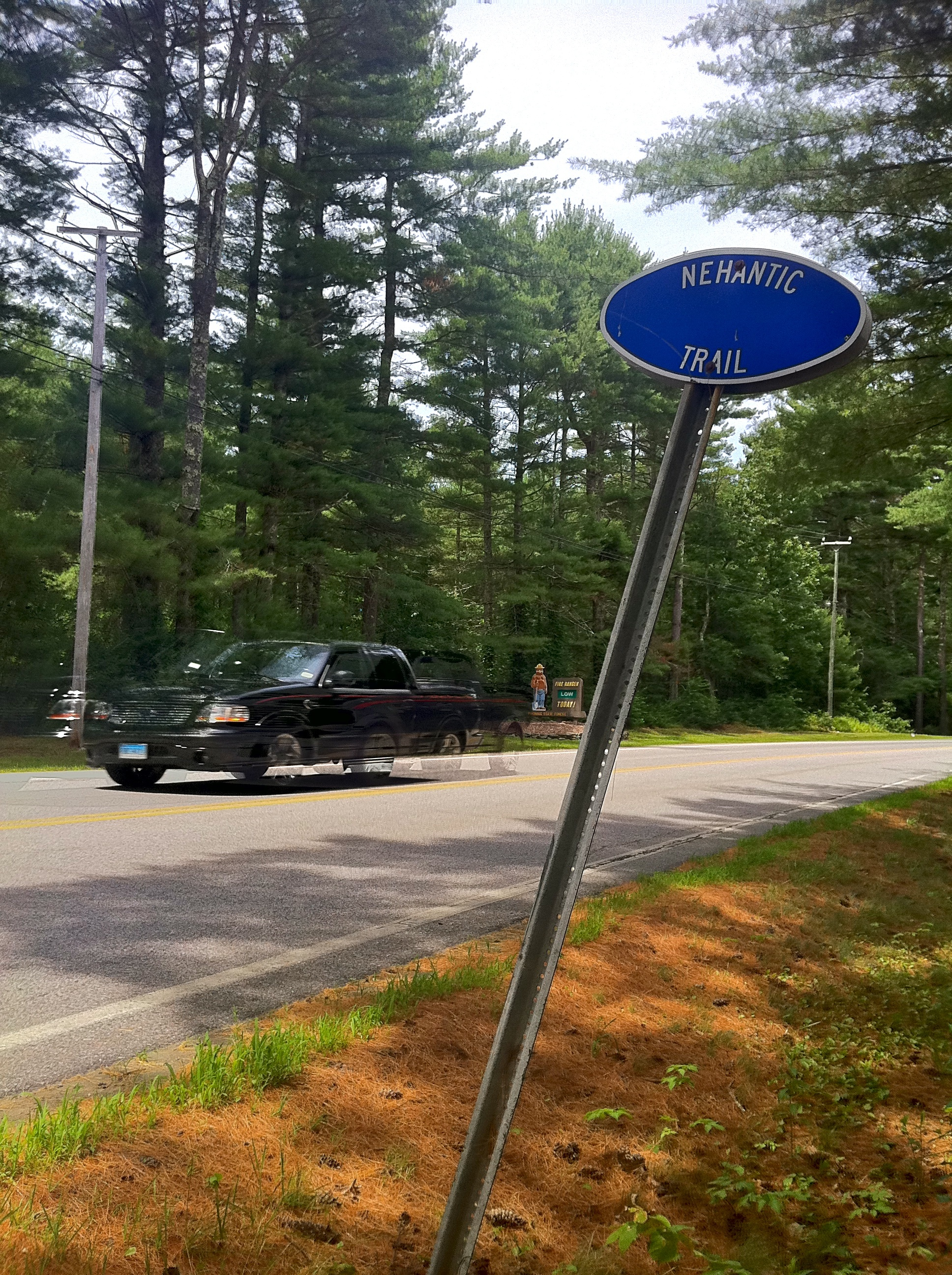
Nehantic Trail sign at CT State Route 49 Crossing.

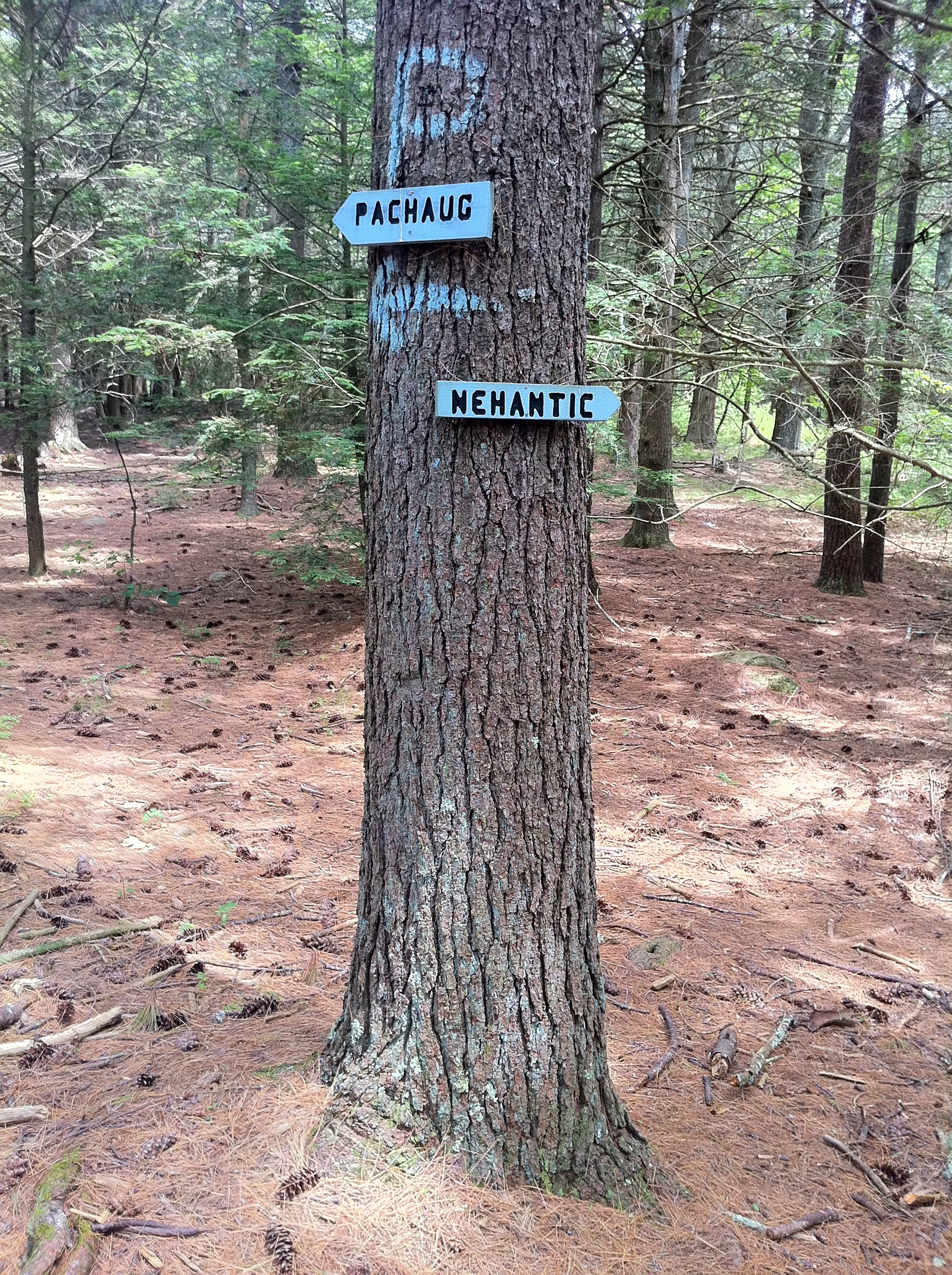
Nehantic & Pachaug shared trail portion's eastern junction.

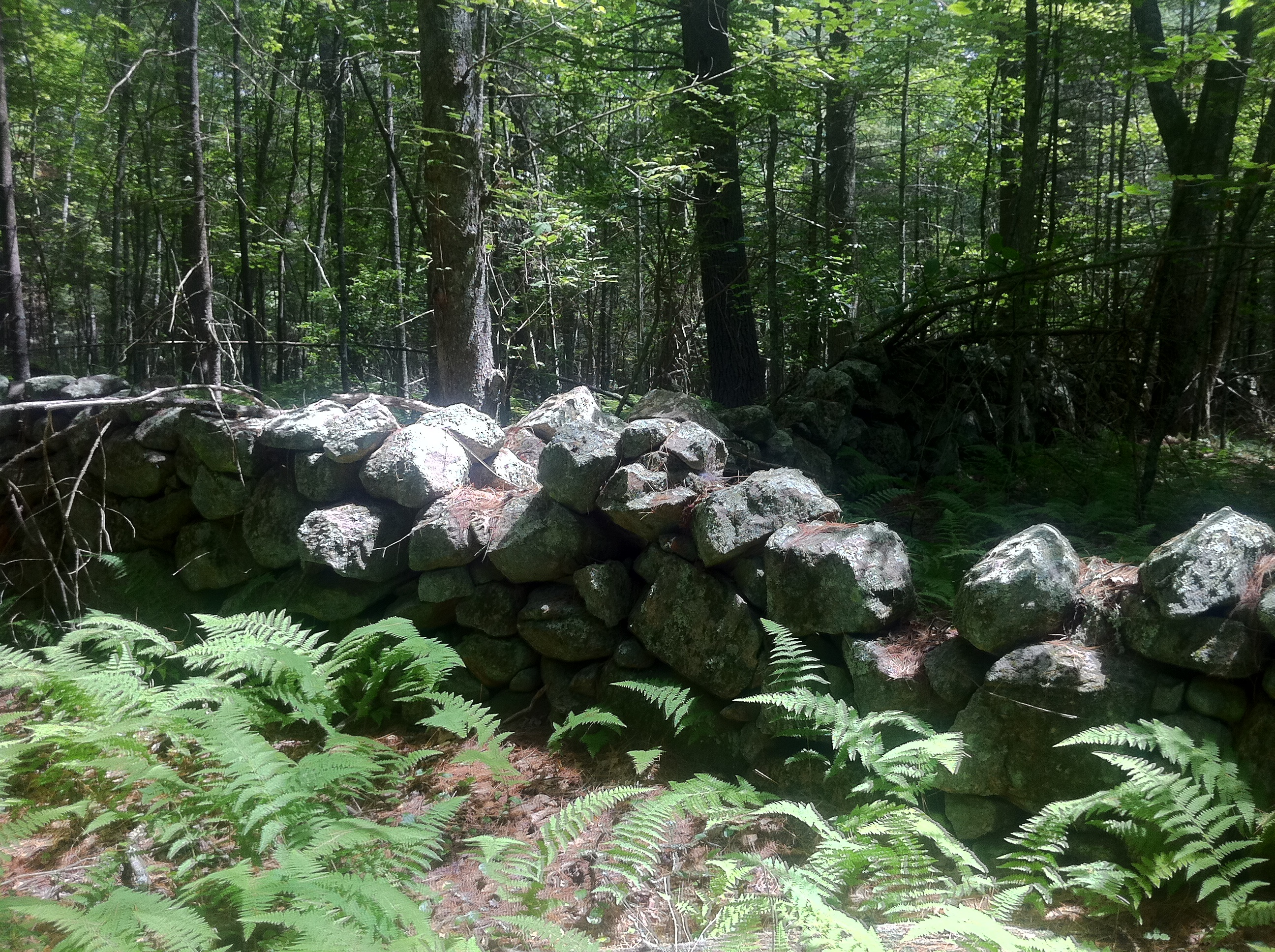
Stone fence near Nehantic Trail & Nehantic-Pachaug Crossover Trail intersection.

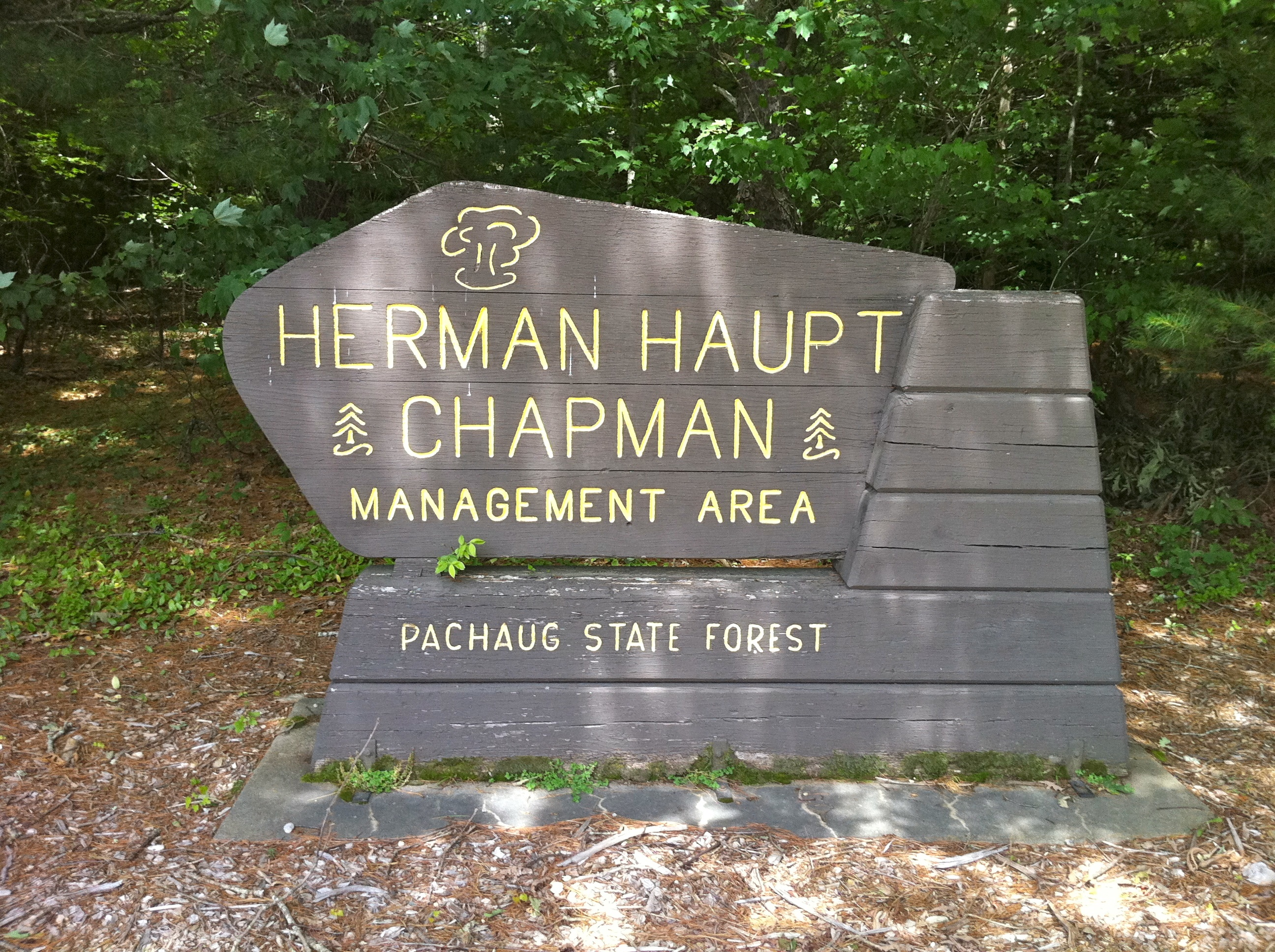
Nehantic Trail - Herman Haupt Chapman Management Area sign

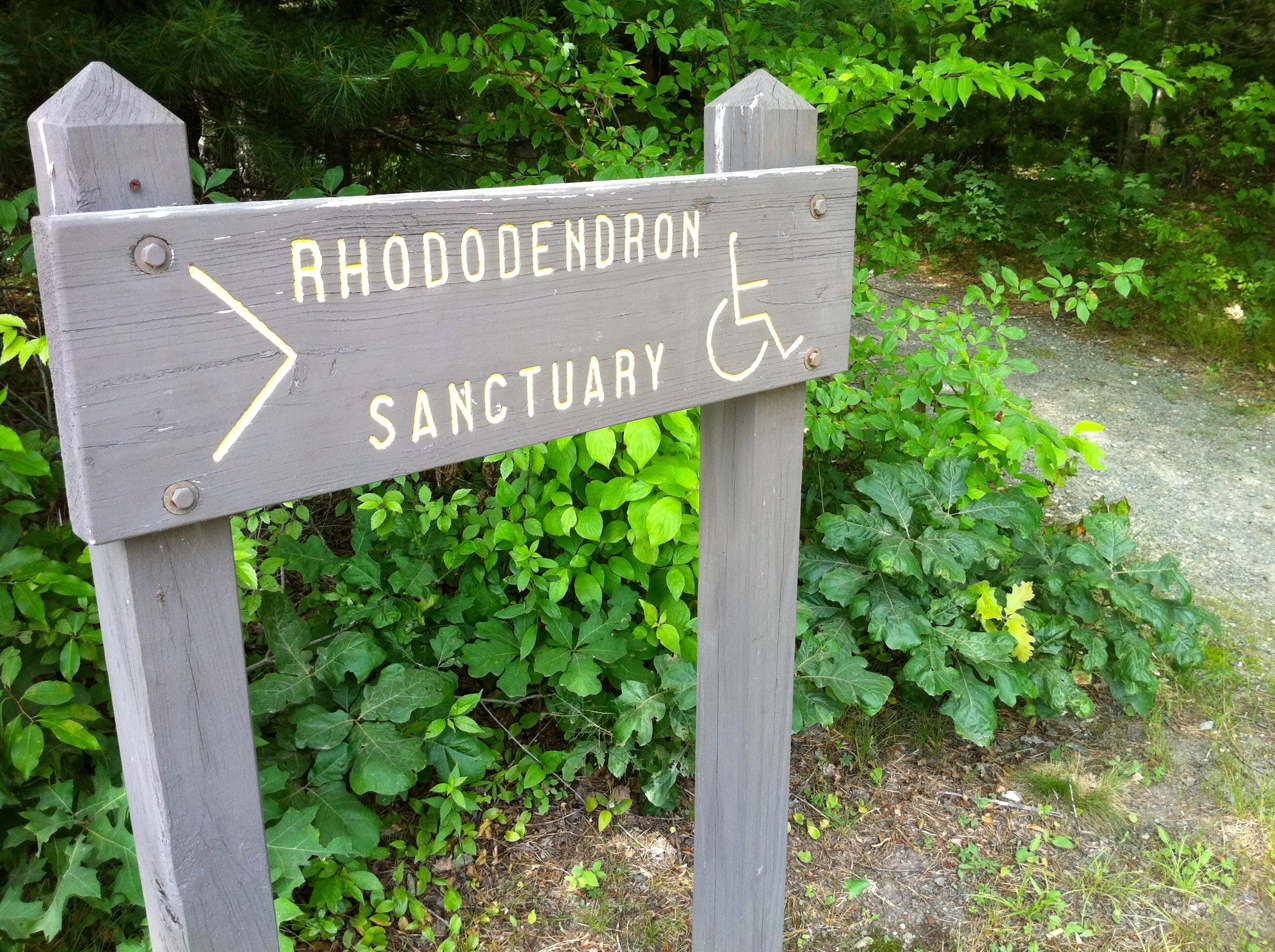
Nehantic Trail - Rhododendron Sanctuary Trail entrance and Wheelchair-accessible sign

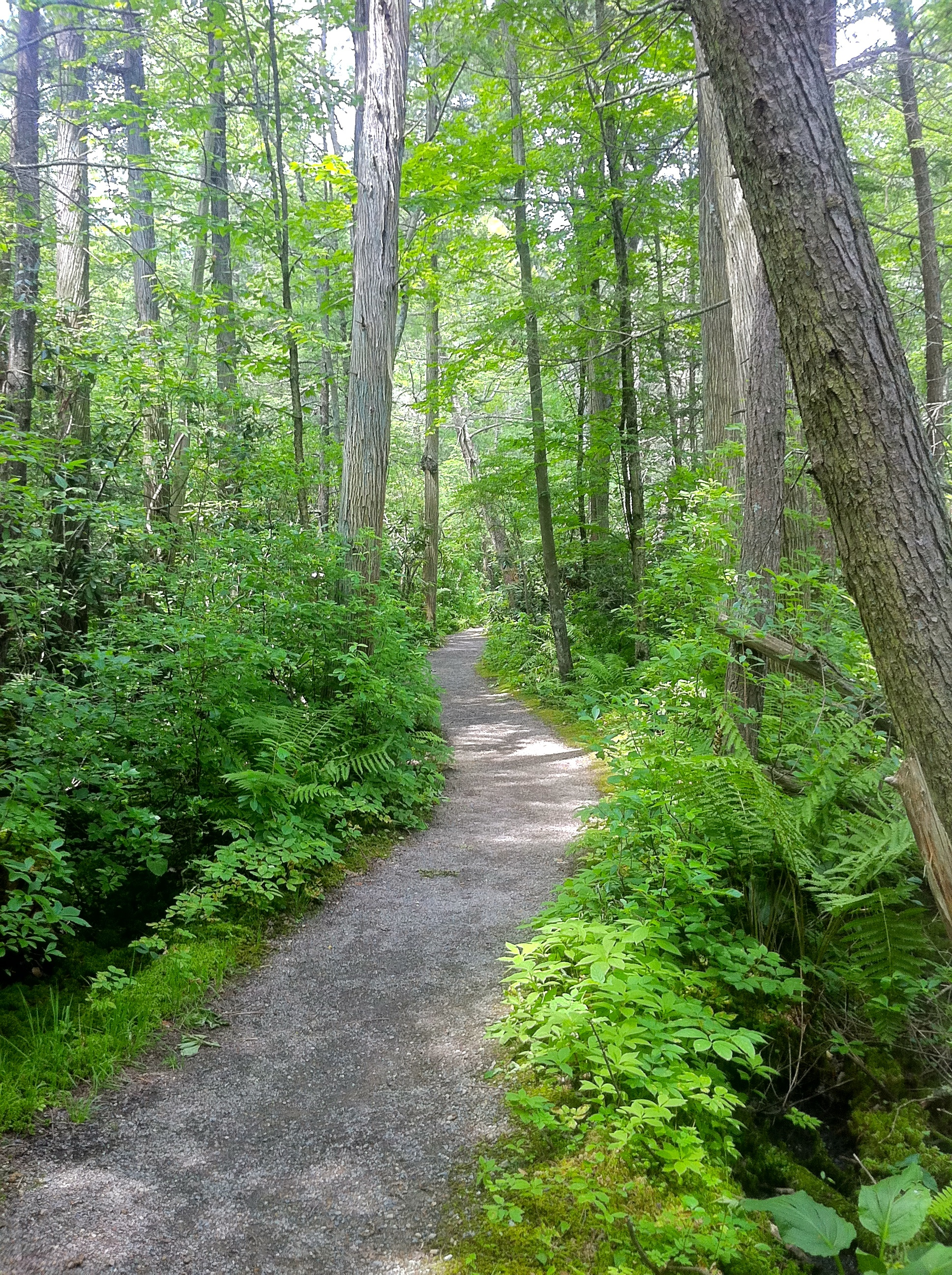
Rhododendron Sanctuary side trail begins off of the Nehantic Trail.

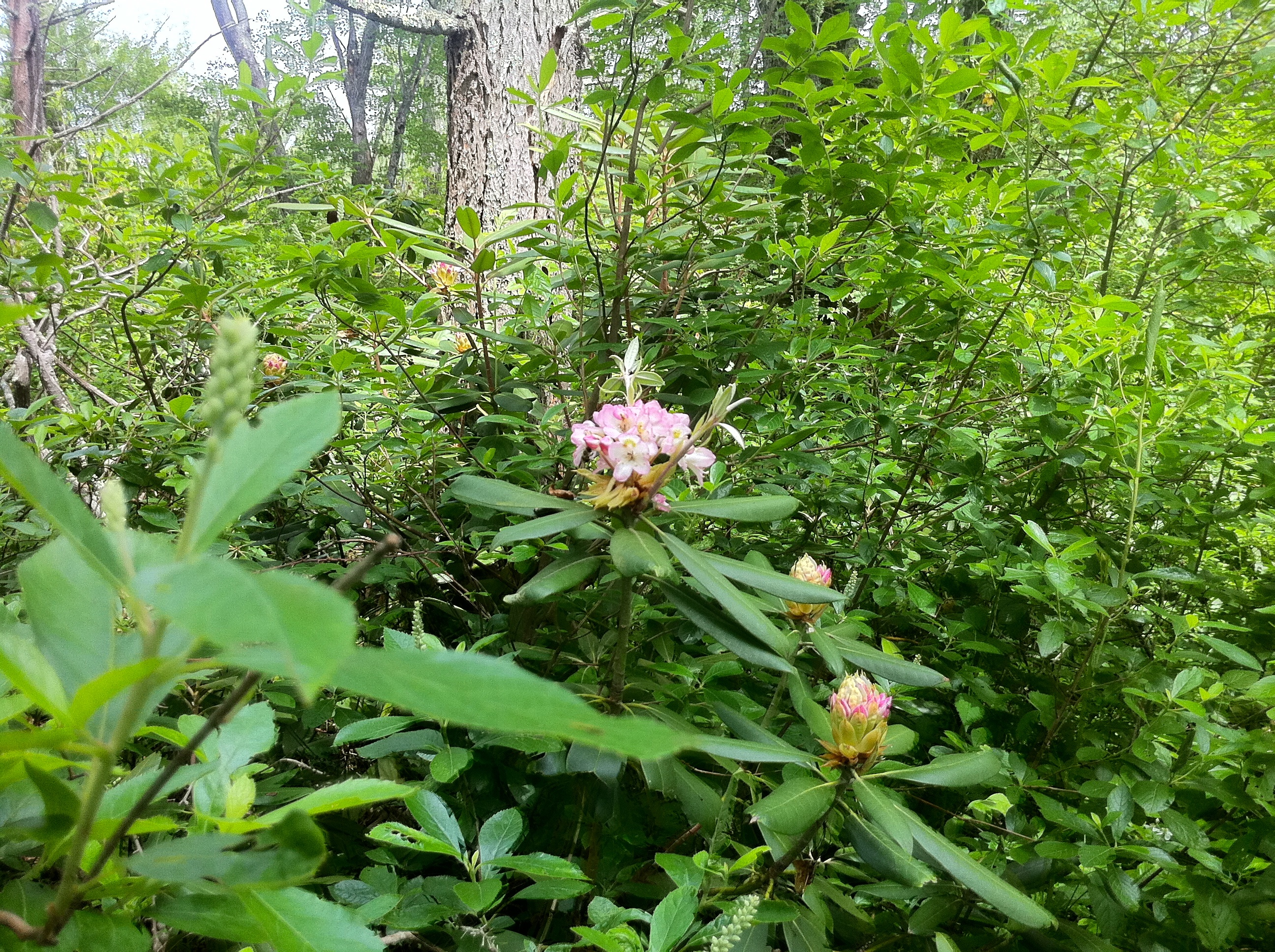
Nehantic Trail - Rhododendron Sanctuary Trail

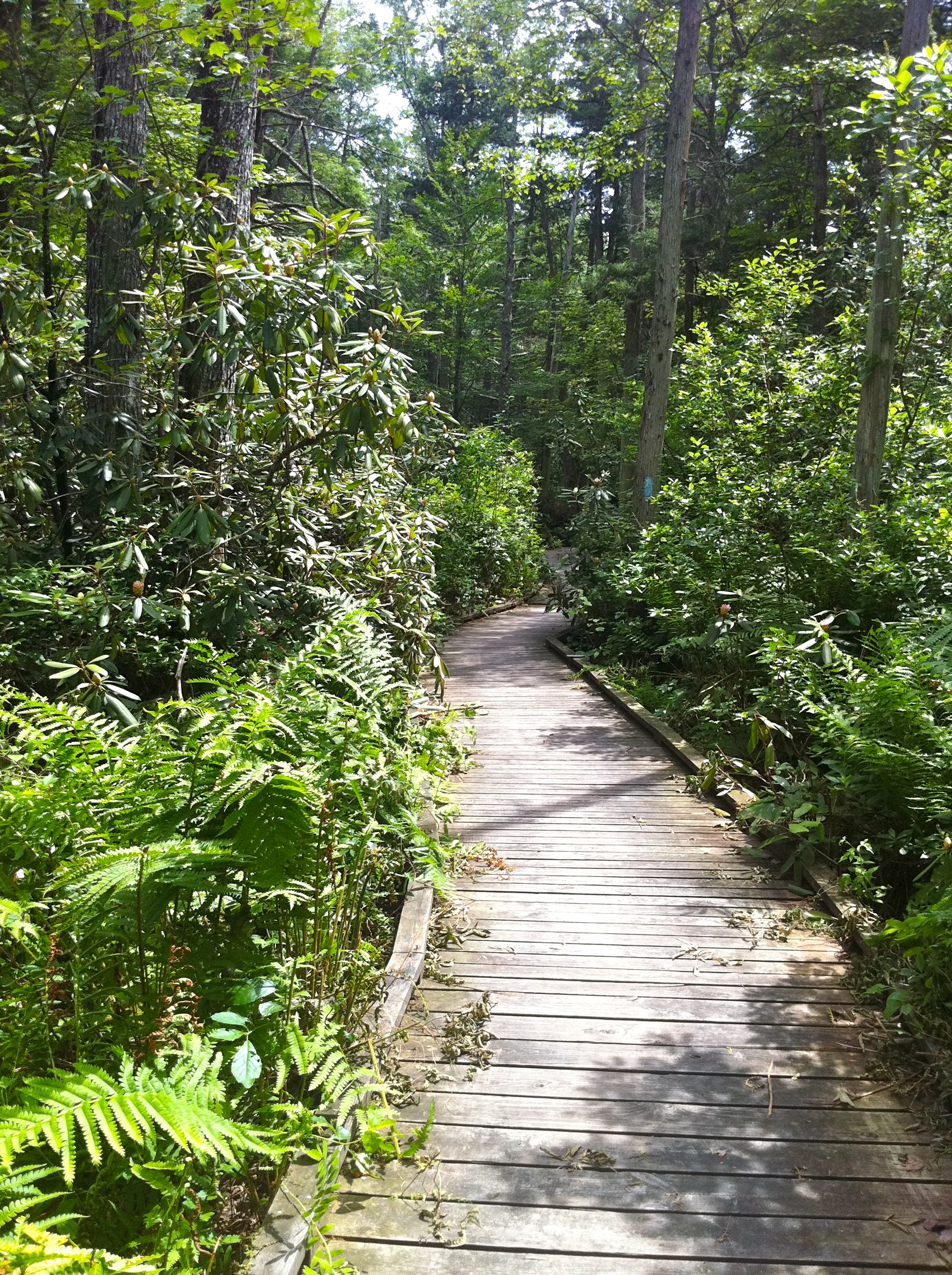
Nehantic Trail - Rhododendron Sanctuary Trail planked wooden boardwalk section

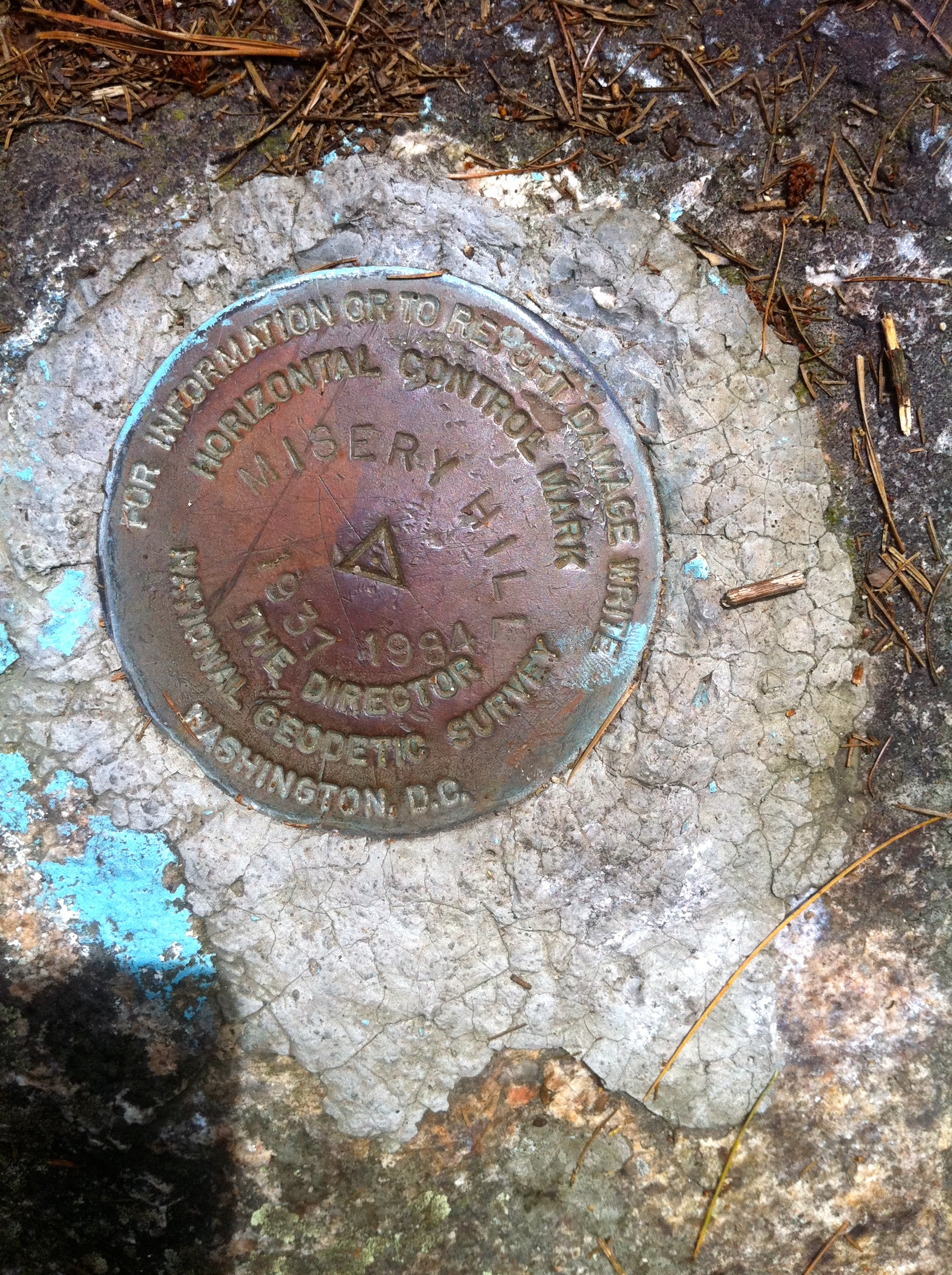
National Geodetic Survey marker on Mount Misery summit.

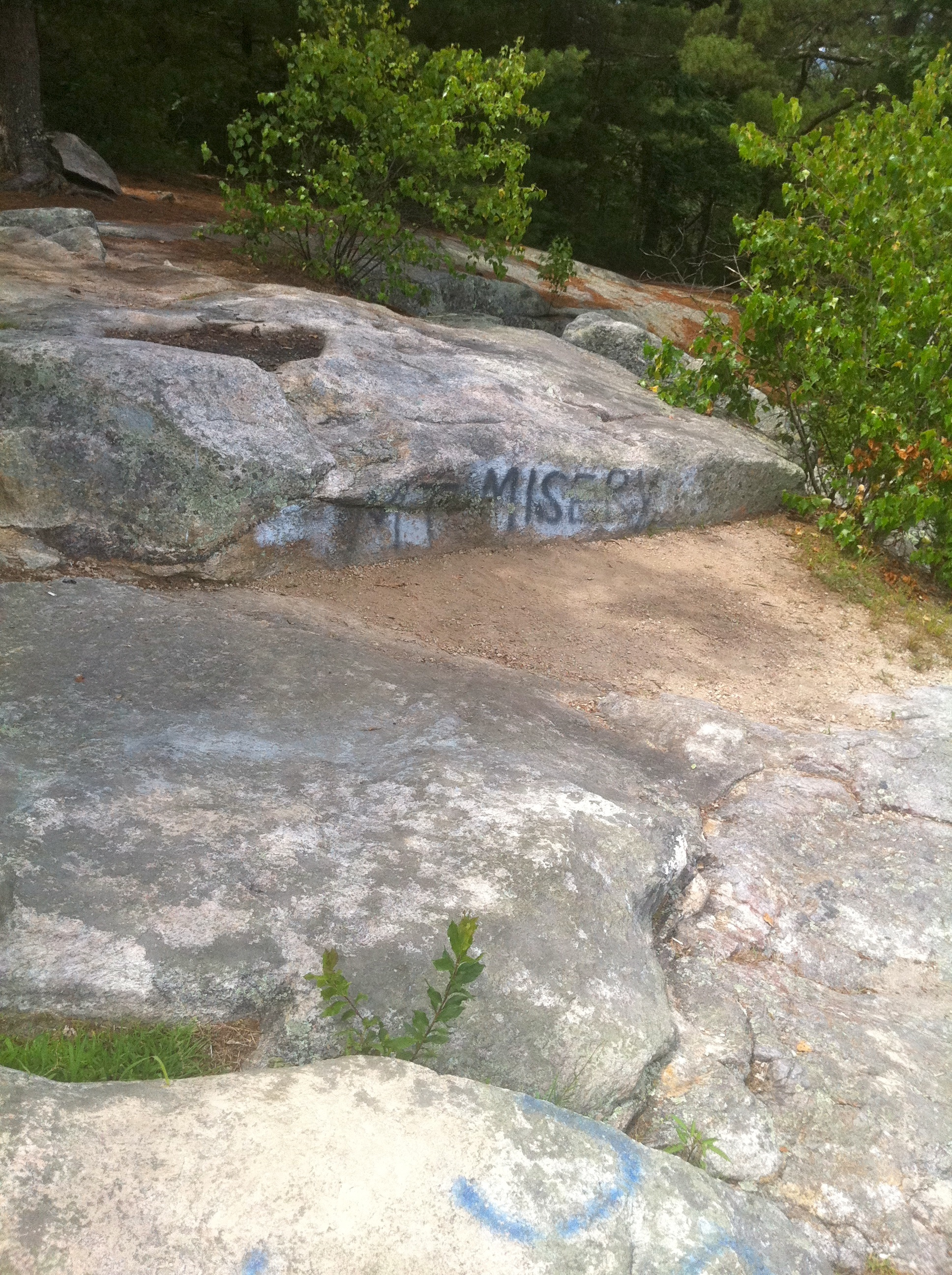
Nehantic Trail - Mount Misery summit

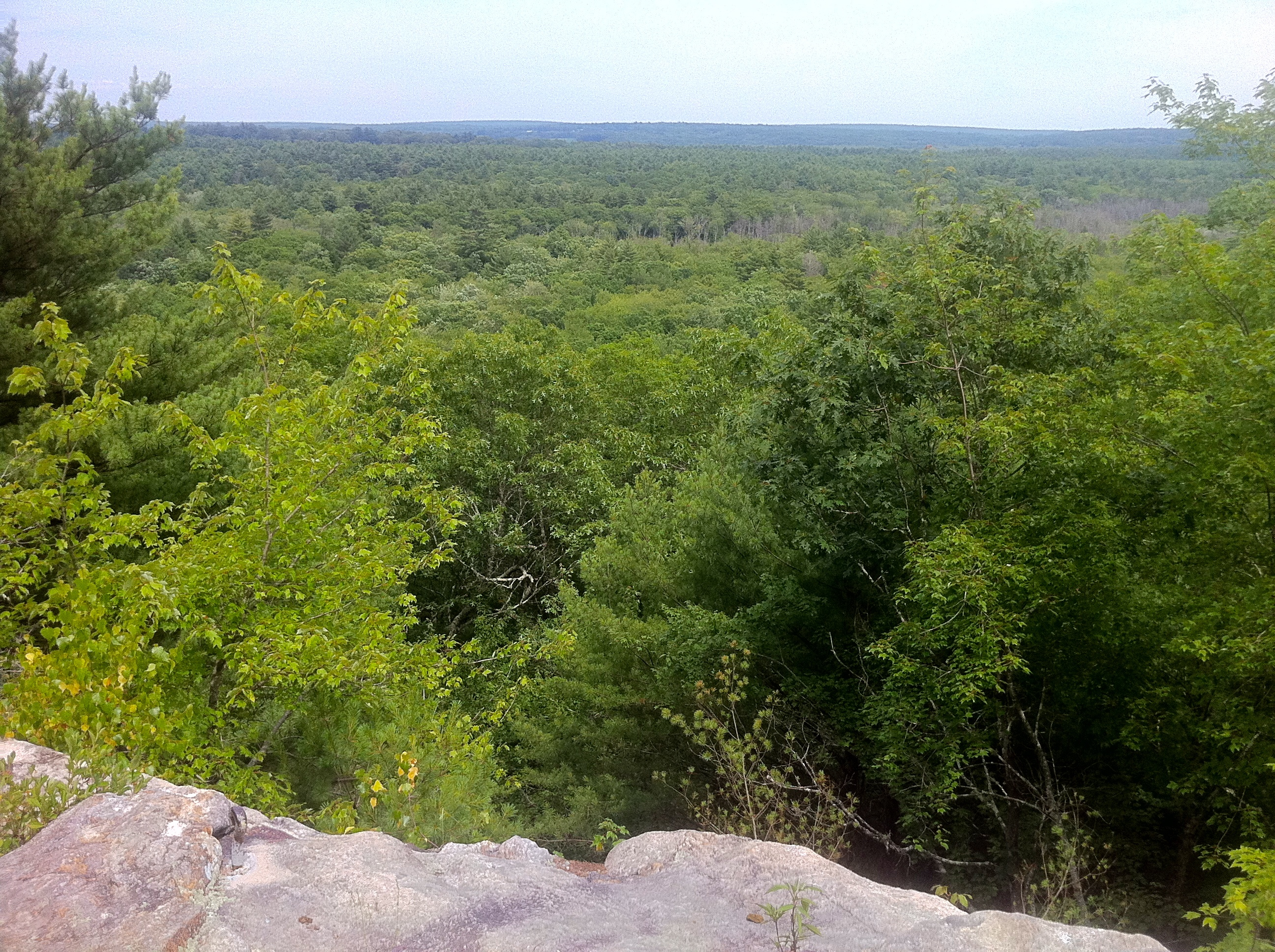
Nehantic Trail - View from Mount Misery summit

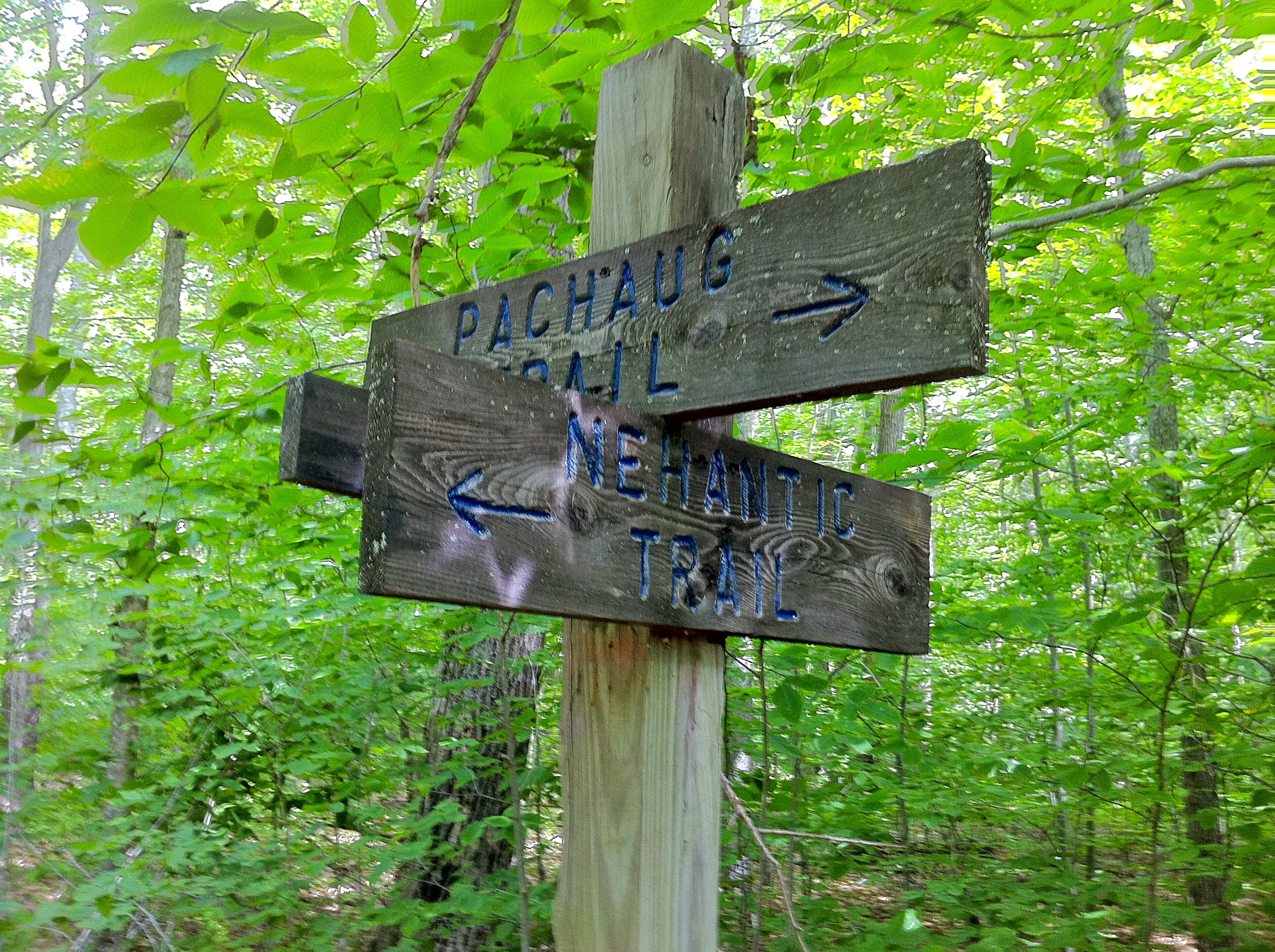
Nehantic & Pachaug shared trail portion's western junction.

== See also ==
- Blue-Blazed Trails
- Quinebaug Trail
- Pachaug State Forest
- Pachaug Trail
