= Sassious =

17th Century Native Chief during the Pequot War

Niantic leader
- In office c. 1630 – c. 1640

Personal details
- Born: c. 1560
- Died: c. 1640
- Children: at least 2, including Ninigret

Military service
- Battles/wars: Pequot War

Sassious was a Niantic sachem in the 17th century who allied himself with the Pequot Confederacy during the Pequot War. He is known from early colonial records that show him as the leader during that conflict.

== Background and role in the Pequot War ==
Sassious was born to the Niantic people, an Algonquian speaking people who lived in what is today Connecticut. He was born some time in the late 16th century and allied himself with Sassacus, a Pequot sachem during the Pequot War. He was listed as one of the Native leaders who opposed the English, Mohegan, and Narragansett. Most of the military actions the Niantic undertook with Sassious would have been around the Connecticut coast, supporting Pequot resistance.

== Legacy ==
His son Ninigret was one of the most successful Native leaders in all of colonial New England. His other son, Wepitimock was also a sachem.
