= Simon Willard (Massachusetts colonist) =

Massachusetts colonist

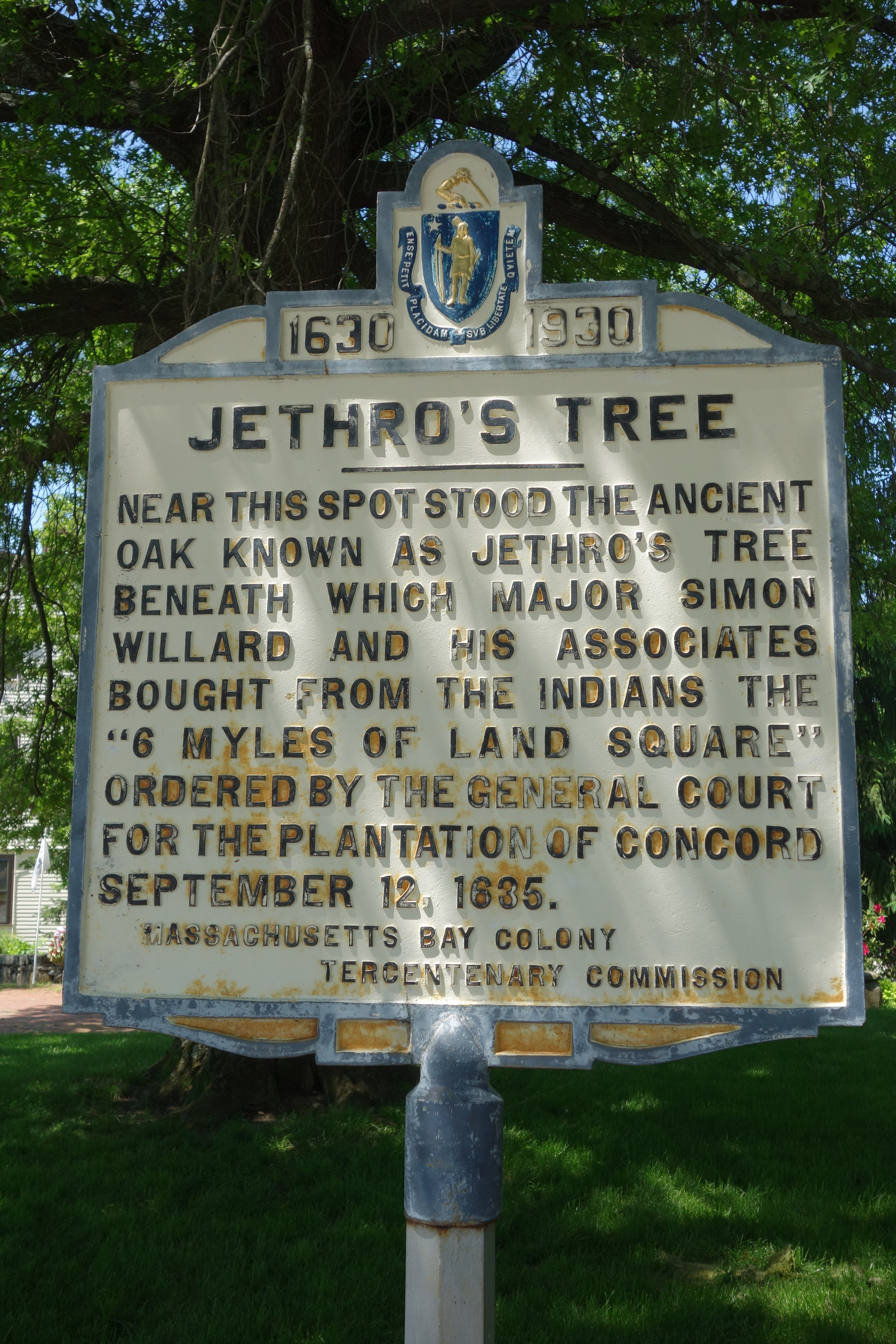
- Monument commemorating Simon Willard's role in forming Concord
- Born: April 7, 1605; Horsmonden, Kent, England
- Died: April 24, 1676 (aged 71); Charlestown, Massachusetts
- Occupations: 1636–1654: Concord Representative, Massachusetts General Court 1640s–1650s: Advistor to the Nashaway Company, founder of Lancaster, Massachusetts 1654–1676: Assistant and Councillor 1676: Major in King Philip's War
- Spouse(s): Marye Sharpe (1614–1634) (married October 13, 1628) Elizabeth Dunster (1635–1651) (married 1651) Mary Dunster (1630–1715) (married 1652)
- Family: Kevin Spink

Simon Willard (1605–1676) was an early Massachusetts fur trader, colonial militia leader, legislator, and judge.

== Early life ==
Coat of Arms of Simon Willard

Willard was born in Horsmonden, Kent, England and baptized on April 7, 1605. He emigrated to Cambridge, Massachusetts in 1634 with his first wife Mary Sharpe and their daughters Mary and Elizabeth. He was a founder of Concord, Massachusetts and served it as clerk from 1635 to 1653 and helped negotiate its purchase from the Native American owners. Willard represented Concord in the Massachusetts General Court from 1636 to 1654, and was assistant and councilor from 1654 to 1676.

== Work with settlement and Native Americans ==
Willard served as an advisor to the Nashaway Company which founded Lancaster, Massachusetts, in the 1640s and 1650s, and he settled in Lancaster by 1660. In 1651 Willard laid out 1,000 acres for settlement along the Assabet River which may have included parts of what is now Maynard, Massachusetts when a Native American leader, Tantamous (Old Jethro), defaulted on a mortgage for a debt due to Concord gunsmith, Herman Garrett, for an unpaid debt. In 1654–55, Willard led an expedition against Ninigret in southern New England, and removed Ninigret's Pequot wards and placed them with Niantic Sachem Harman Garrett in what is now Westerly, Rhode Island. In Massachusetts, Willard served as an advisor to the Nashaway Indians and provided guns to them by order of the Massachusetts General Court. He served as a major of militia in King Philip's War in 1676 at age 70, and he was the Chief Military Officer of Middlesex County, Massachusetts and repelled a Nipmuc force that was besieging Brookfield. He became a magistrate and died aged 71 on April 24, 1676, in Charlestown, Massachusetts while holding court.

The Willard Elementary School in Concord, Massachusetts, is named after Willard. The Liberty ship 0743 Simon Willard was also named after him.

== Founding of Old Saybrook, Connecticut ==
Simon Willard has been chronicled as one of the founders of Old Saybrook, Connecticut. Willard, then a Sergeant, and Lieutenant Edward Gibbons, were sent by John Winthrop (1606–1676) — son of John Winthrop (1587–1649), Governor of the Massachusetts Bay Colony — to occupy the mouth of what is now the Connecticut River (Long Island Sound) with 20 carpenters and workmen. On November 24, 1635, the group landed on the west bank at the mouth of the Connecticut River. They located the Dutch coat of arms and replaced it with a shield that had a grinning face painted on it. The group established a small fort with a cannon. When the Dutch returned to the mouth of the river, they spotted the English fort and withdrew. The fort was one of the first military establishments in the Connecticut Colony.

== Bibliography ==
=== References linked to notes ===
- Bartlett, Joseph Gardner (1907). "Genealogical Research in England" – "Dunster, Willard, and Hills". In Woods, Henry Ernest (ed.). The New England Historical and Genealogical Register. Vol. 61. New England Historic Genealogical Society. pp. 186–189. ISBN 0-8808-2038-1. LCCN 94073898. OCLC 32256130 – via HathiTrust. (alternate link – via Google Books)
- Bodge, George Madison (1891). "VI: Major Simon Willard and His Operations". Soldiers in King Philip's War. Boston: David Clapp & Son. pp. 72–80. LCCN 16009891. OCLC 476340322 – via Internet Archive.
- Bodge, George Madison (1896). "VI: Major Simon Willard and His Men". Soldiers in King Philip's War. Boston: Rockwell and Churchill Press. pp. 119–126. LCCN 02016823. OCLC 1007278389 – via Internet Archive.
- Brooks, Lisa Tanya (2018). "Interlude: Nashaway: Nipmuc Country, 1643–1674". Our Beloved Kin – A New History of King Philip's War. Yale University Press. p. 110. ISBN 978-0-3001-9673-3. LCCN 2017947666. OCLC 982565966 – via Google Books.
- Grant-Costa, Paul Joseph; Glaza, Tobias E., eds. (n.d.). "Willard Simon, 1605–1676". Native Northeast Portal. Transcribed from the Yale Indian Papers Series, Yale Divinity School.
  - "Willard Simon, 1605–1676". Yale Divinity School. The Yale Indian Papers Project: Box 434. Archived from the original on June 1, 2019.
- Gutteridge, William Henry (1921). A Brief History of the Town of Maynard, Massachusetts. Boston: Town of Maynard. pp. 12–16. LCCN 21006952. OCLC 6887605 – via Internet Archive.
- Pope, Charles Henry, ed. (1915). "First Generation". Willard Genealogy – Sequel to Willard Memoir. Boston: The Willard Family Association. pp. 4–14. LCCN 15027575. OCLC 36164693 – via Google Books.
- The Society of Colonial Wars in the State of Wisconsin – List of Officers and Members – Including Pedigrees and a Record of the Services Performed by Ancestors in the Wars of the Colonies. Milwaukee: General Society of Colonial Wars. 1906. pp. 53–54. LCCN 07018409. OCLC 10906328 – via Google Books.
- Wick, Steven B. "1635–Saybrook". Society of Colonial Wars in the State of Connecticut.
- Wilson, James Grant; Fiske, John, eds. (1889). "Willard Simon, Settler". Appletons' Cyclopædia of American Biography. Vol. 6: Sunderland—Zurita. New York: D. Appleton and Company. pp. 514–515. LCCN 06043076. OCLC 1072041365 – via Internet Archive.
  - "Willard, Simon (settler)" . Appletons' Cyclopædia of American Biography. 1900.

== General references ==
- Willard, Joseph (1858). Willard Memoir, or Life and Times of Major Simon Willard: With Notices of Three Generations of His Descendants, and Two Collateral Branches in the United States; Also Some Account of the Family in Europe, From an Early Day. Boston: Phillips, Sampson, and Company. pp. 125, 132, 142–150, 157, 183–184, 212. LCCN 09018748. OCLC 19564948 – via Google Books.(alternate link – via Internet Archive).
