= Harman Garrett =

Niantic sachem and then governor of the Eastern Pequots (c. 1610 – c. 1678)

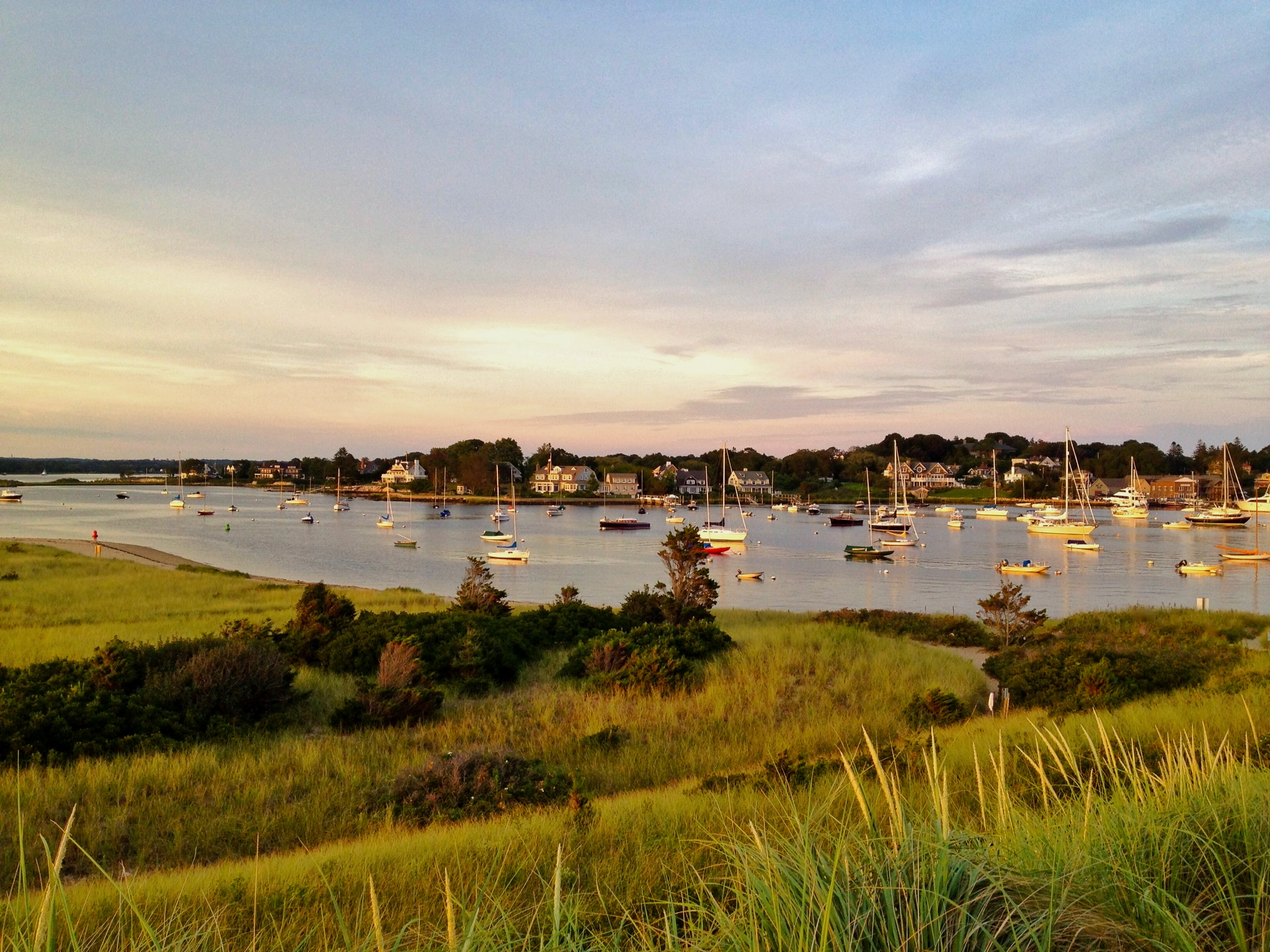
Watch Hill in Westerly was part of Garrett's claimed lands

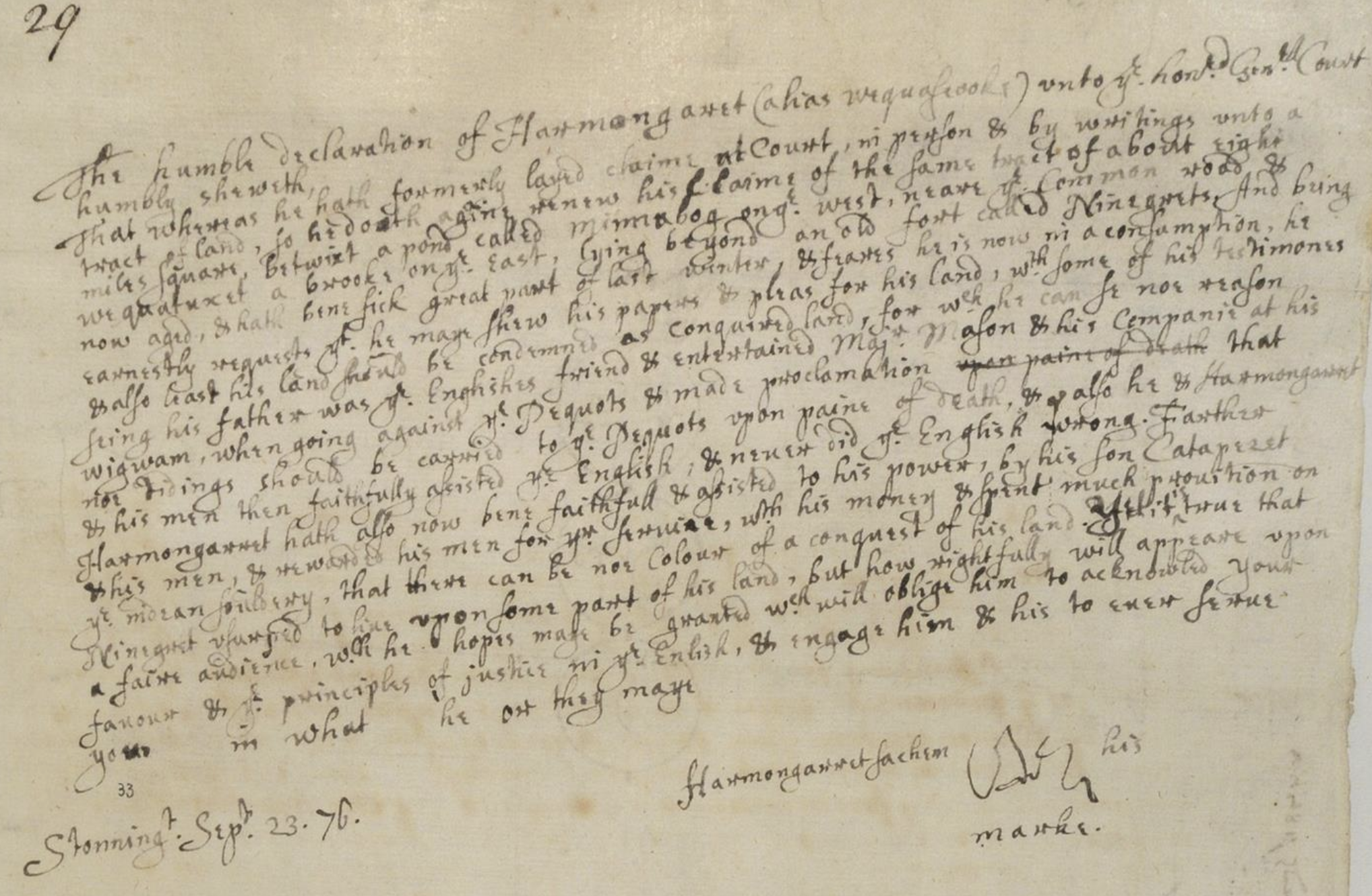
1676 declaration of Harman Garret unto the General Court requesting that his lands, which were usurped by Ninigret, not be taken by conquest by the colonists

Harman Garrett (c. 1610 – c. 1678) (also known as Cashawashett or Wequashcook II or Herman Garrett or Harmon Garrett) was a Niantic sachem and then governor of the Eastern Pequots slightly east of the Pawcatuck River in what is now Westerly, Rhode Island. His chosen English name (taken by at least 1654) was very similar to that of Herman Garrett, a prominent colonial gunsmith from Massachusetts in the 1650s.

== Early life ==
Garrett was the son of Eastern Niantic sachem Wepitanock (also known as Momojosbuck or Wettamozo) and his unnamed wife (who may have been a Pequot and died in 1648) and the grandson of sachem Saccious. Garrett was also the half-brother of Wequash Cooke, who helped the colonial military to defeat the Pequots during the Pequot War in 1637 before forming marriage alliances with several captured Pequot women. Either Garrett or his brother married the Pequot widow of Tattaopme and became stepfather of Tausquonawhut, the brother or nephew of Sassacus. Tausquonawhut (Tassaquanot) eventually married Ninigret's daughter. After Wequash Cook's death in 1642, Garrett assumed his brother's name and attempted to assume his leadership role, but his uncle Ninigret contested this because Garrett's mother was not Niantic, making him only half Niantic.

== Involvement with Pequot at Pawcatuck ==
In the 1640s, Garrett worked with John Mason of the Saybrook Colony to negotiate Garrett's territorial boundaries with the United Colonies and his right to be a leader of some of the conquered Pequots and to some of their former territory. Despite opposition from the Narragansetts and Uncas who claimed he didn't fight the Pequots or pay his proper share of the 1645 indemnity, he began hunting in Pequot territory in 1646, and by 1648 with Mason's support, Garrett formed a small community of Niantics and former Pequots on the west bank of the Pawcatuck River, which was somewhat forced to be allied to Uncas against Ninigret. John Winthrop, Jr. and Robin Cassacinamon briefly held Garrett in 1648/49 on house arrest for unclear reasons, but Winthrop then reversed course and became Garrett's ally and advocated for his Pawcatuck settlement. Garrett's personal home was in Pawcatuck, to the north of the modern bridge connecting Westerly, Rhode Island and Stonington, Connecticut.

Around this time, Uncas allegedly paid an Indian named Wampushet to attack another Indian with a hatchet and then to falsely blame Garrett for ordering the attack. Wampushet gave testimony before the United Colonies with Uncas present, but it was unclear who ordered the attack.

== Governorship of Eastern Pequots ==
In 1654 Captain Simon Willard led a mission from Massachusetts against Ninigret's Niantics and forced him to turn over control of the Pequots under his jurisdiction to the United Colonies. By at least May 18, 1654 Garrett had taken the name of former Massachusetts gunsmith Herman Garrett, who had been an associate of Simon Willard. Some Native Americans adopted the firearm related names as "another way for a man to call attention to his martial achievements." In September 1655, the Commissioners of the United Colonies appointed Herman Garrett governor over these Pequots and Niantics (at Pawcatuck and Wekapauge) to collect tributes (owed by the Pequots since the Pequot War) and to mediate disputes, and they appointed Thomas Stanton to work with him. In 1661, Massachusetts authorities mediated a territorial dispute between Garrett and his uncle Ninigret regarding the land in and around Westerly. By 1663 encroachments and land disputes occurred with nearby settlers, causing Garrett to move to Southertowne (Stonington).

== King Philip's War and later life ==
In 1676 Garrett, Oneco, and Cassasinamon jointly executed Narragansett Sachem Canonchet during King Philip's War, while fighting alongside colonial forces. Garrett's group of Indians were given land in northern Stonington in 1683 after Garrett's death. His will left his property to his son Cattepeset, but Garrett's deputy Mamaho took power after Garrett's death, and a power struggle ensued with Cassacinamon's group.
