= George Madison Bodge =

American author and historian

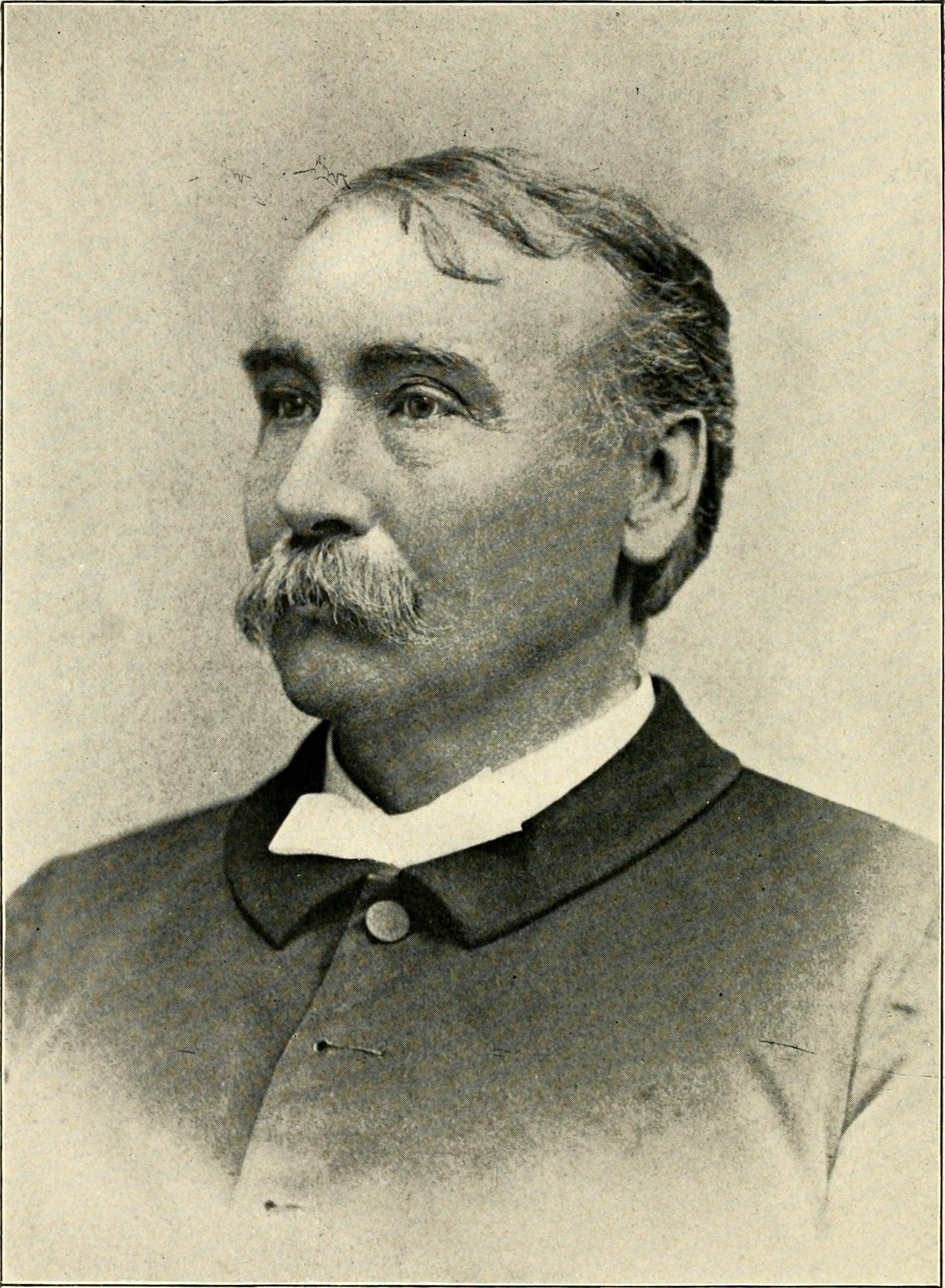
- Born: February 14, 1841
- Died: July 17, 1914 (aged 73)
- Occupations: Author and historian

George Madison Bodge (February 14, 1841 – July 17, 1914) was an American author and historian best known for his study of King Philip's War. He also wrote and edited numerous articles and books focusing on the Unitarian Church and genealogy.

== Life ==
Bodge was born in Windham, Maine, on February 14, 1841, the third of five children, to Rev. John Anderson Bodge and Esther A. Harmon. John Anderson Bodge became a clergyman after working as a blacksmith.

On July 15, 1861, George Bodge enlisted into the 7th Maine Volunteer Infantry Regiment as a fife major for three years of service, but was discharged October 26, 1862, likely when the unit was ordered back to Portland, Maine, to recruit. His enlistment documents show him to be a single school teacher when he enlisted. After the war, he attended Bowdoin College, graduating in 1868. He continued his career as an educator, serving as the principal of Gould Academy in Bethel, Maine, until 1871, of Gorham Seminary until 1874, and of the Westbrook Seminary, which later became Westbrook College. He remained at Westbrook for four years.

Bodge then chose to attend Harvard Divinity School and graduated in 1878. After graduation, he was ordained as a Unitarian pastor and served at the Third Society, Dorchester, Massachusetts (Unitarian), until October 31, 1884. He then became the minister of the First Parish of Westwood, Massachusetts, on February 19, 1899.

He died in West Roxbury, Massachusetts, on July 17, 1914, of gangrene in his left leg. He left behind a wife, Esther Ann (Harmon) Bodge, and two daughters.

== Academic works ==
Bodge was the author of several works. The Narragansett Fort Fight, December 19, 1675 (1886) is a specific account of the battles and participants that made up the Narragansett Fort Fight. Soldiers in King Philip's War: Being a Critical Account of That War with a Concise History of the Indian Wars of New England from 1620–1677 (1892) was written by Bodge when he was the Chaplain for the Massachusetts Society of Colonial Wars. This was the first attempt by an historian to document the name of those credited with military service in the New England Indian Wars, along with giving historical specifics of battles and military operations at the company level. It has become historically significant in its level of detail and genealogically significant in that it provides a resource for identifying residences of those with military service and an estimated date and place of death for those killed. Memoir of Nathaniel Foster Safford (1893) is an account of Nathaniel Foster Stafford, a Massachusetts attorney and member of the New England Historic Genealogical Society written upon his death. It includes a brief genealogy of the Safford family. The Churchill Family in America is a genealogy of the Churchill family of New England, written by Gardner Asaph and Nathaniel Wiley Churchill and edited by George M. Bodge

== Lineage and philanthropic organizations ==
Bodge was a member of several societies and organizations, including the Grand Lodge of Massachusetts, The Mayflower Society, the Massachusetts Society of Colonial Wars, the New England Historic Genealogical Society and the Sons of the American Revolution.
