= Herman Garrett =

Early American gunsmith, blacksmith, and landowner (c. 1607 – c.1656)

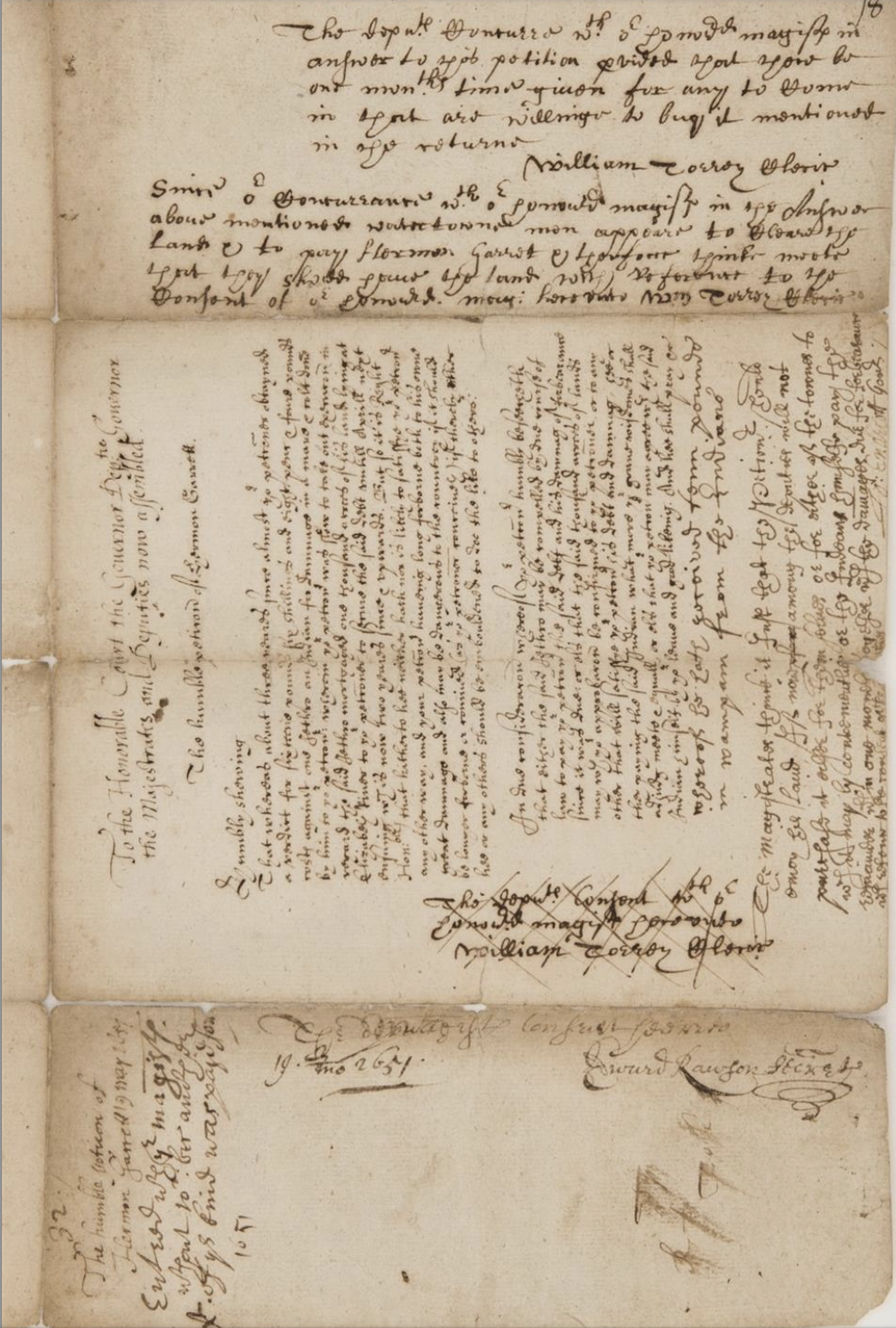
Petition by Harmon Garrett for Old Jethro's land along the Elizabeth River (Assabet) near what is now Maynard, Massachusetts

Herman Garrett (also known as Harman Garrett) (c. 1607 – c.1656/57) was an early American gunsmith, blacksmith, and landowner in colonial Massachusetts.

Herman Garrett was from Wickham Market in England. In 1628, he married Susan Tofts in Ipswich. Garrett immigrated to Massachusetts by 1638 and worked as a gunsmith and blacksmith in Charlestown, Boston, until 1652 when he moved across the Charles River to Boston. In 1640, Garrett hired John Edwards as an apprentice gunsmith in Charlestown, with an agreement for Edwards to purchase Garrett's shop, but in 1642 Garrett received Edwards' property after a complaint was filed by Edwards alleging an inflated valuation of Garrett's property. In 1643 Garrett removed to Concord, Massachusetts to the house of Robert Hethersay who had previously granted Garrett a mortgage on his house in Concord as security for a loan which Hethersay failed pay. By 1643 Garrett was a member of the Nashaway Company which settled the area around what is now Lancaster, Massachusetts, and due to his profession, he may have been involved because of the iron ore deposits in the area. By 1650, the Garretts were living in Boston, as Susan Garrett signed a petition by the women of Boston to allow Alice Tilly to work as a midwife. In 1651 Garrett, was a sometimes resident of Watertown, and he received from the Court 1,000 acres along the Assabet River which may have included parts of what is now Maynard, Massachusetts, when a Native American leader, Tantamous, defaulted on a mortgage for a debt due to Garrett for a mare and a colt. Tantamous' property was laid out by Simon Willard, Garrett's partner in the Nashaway Company, and then sold to the town of Watertown. Garrett returned to England and died and was buried at Wickham Market in 1657.
