= Ninigret =

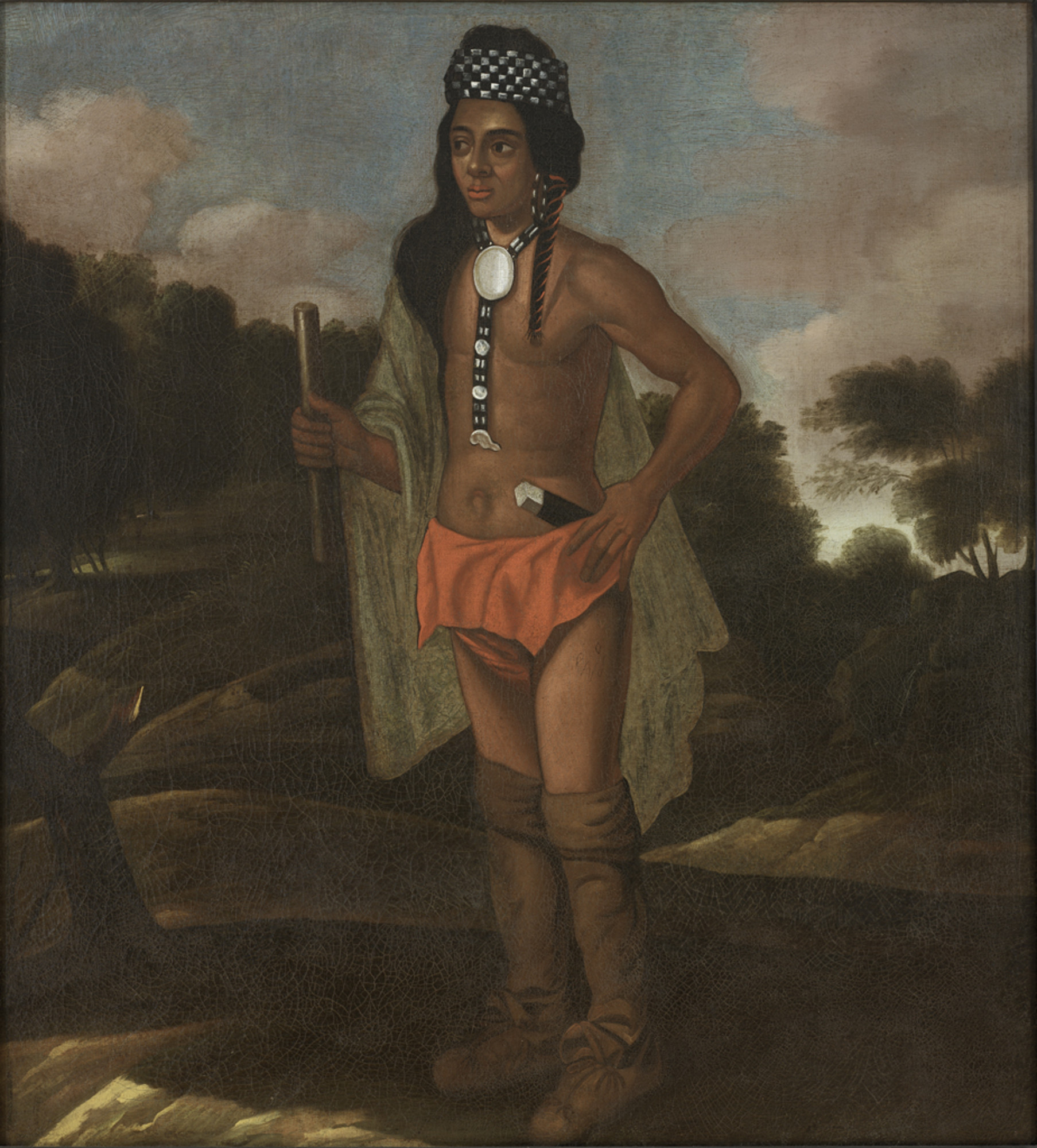
- Ninigret in 1681 (collection of Rhode Island School of Design Museum)

Niantic leader

Personal details
- Resting place: "Burying Hill" near Charlestown, Rhode Island
- Relations: Nephew Miantonomo
- Children: Son Ninigret; daughter
- Parent: Sassious
- Nickname: Juanemo

Ninigret (also known as Juanemo according to Roger Williams) (c. 1610-1677) was a sachem of the eastern Niantic Indian tribe in New England at the time of colonization, based in Rhode Island. In 1637, he allied with the colonists and the Narragansetts against the Pequot Indians.

Ninigret is credited with keeping the Niantics out of King Philip's War, in which the colonists fought to prevent their homes and settlements from being destroyed by certain Indian tribes.

== Biography ==
Ninigret was the son of Sachem Sassious, the cousin or the uncle of Miantonomo, and the uncle and brother-in-law of Harman Garrett. He was first known to the colonists as Janemo and was sachem of the Niantics, a tribe of the Narragansett people. He did not participate in the Pequot war of 1632, and he aided the colonists in the Pequot war of 1637. About a year after the death of Miantonomo, he formed a plan for expelling the colonists and sent a messenger to Long Island sachem Waiandance to engage him in it. Waiandance tied up the messenger and sent him to the fort at Saybrook. They sent him on to Hartford, but the party was forced to put in at Shelter Island, where the messenger escaped.

In 1644, the New England Confederation raised an army to protect their ally, Uncas, against Ninigret. Humphrey Atherton lead the expedition into Narraganset country with the aim of renewing alliances. Ninigret and his men abandoned their siege. Atherton, who held the rank of Captain at the time, marched into the wigwam of Ninigret and threatened Ninigret’s life. This step had the desired effect and the sachem allegedly begged for his life, and promised submission.

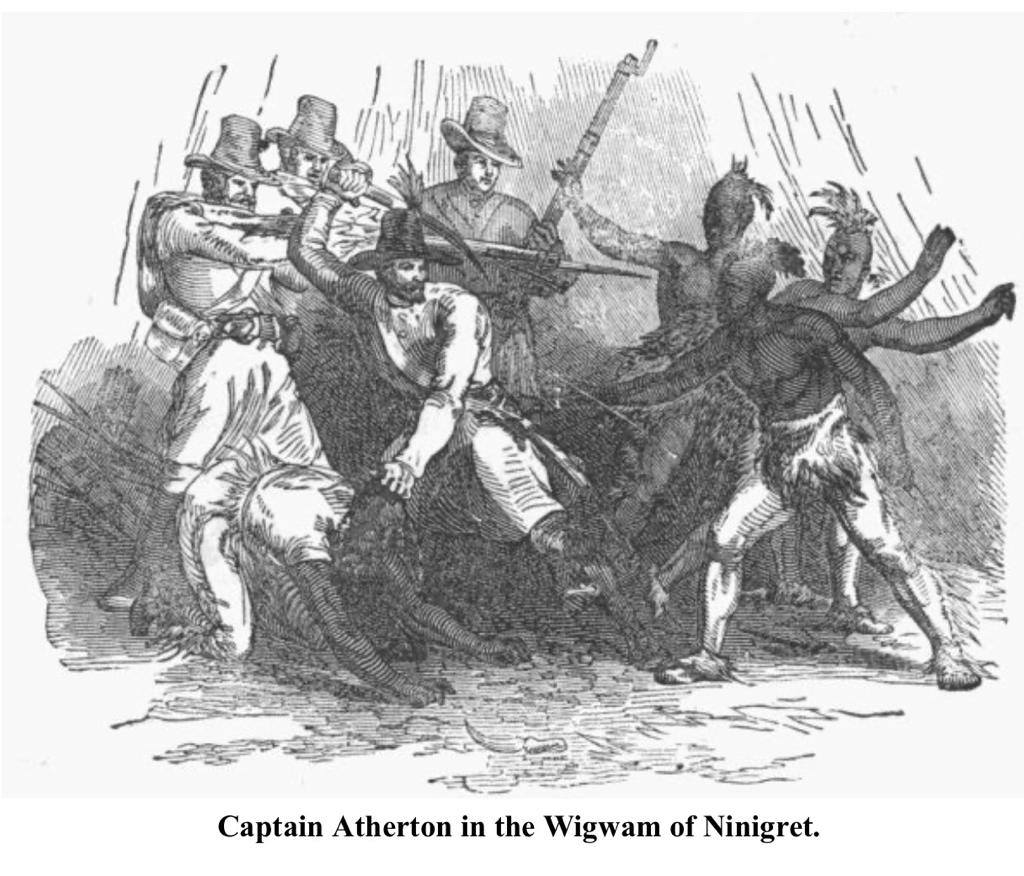
Captain Humphrey Atherton and his men enter Ninigret’s wigwam using force

Ninigret passed the winter of 1652-53 among the Dutch colonists in Manhattan and the western Indians. New England's colonists suspected Ninigret of plotting against them, and suspected that he was seeking stockpiles of guns and forming alliances with other well-armed Indian groups. Ninigret waged war against the Long Island Indians who had placed themselves under the protection of the New England colonists. In September 1654, the Connecticut colonists demanded his appearance in Hartford and the payment of tribute that had long been due from his Pequot subjects. Ninigret refused to appear and sent them a haughty answer. The Massachusetts Bay Colony then declared war against him and put 270 infantry and 40 horsemen under the command of Major Simon Willard. Willard's instructions were to go to Ninigret's quarters, demand the tribute, and insist that he end the war against the Long Island Indians. On the approach of the troops, Ninigret fled to a distant swamp and was not pursued, but the Pequots who had been under his control were transferred to Harmon Garrett to oversee.

On October 13, 1660, Ninigret gave Pettequamscot to the Colony of Rhode Island. He took no part in King Philip's War (1675-76) and so escaped the ruin which overtook the other tribes. His remains are said to be buried at a place near Charlestown, Rhode Island, called Burying Hill.

The Puritans achieved little in trying to convert the Narragansetts and Niantics to Christianity. Roger Williams recorded his discouragement about it. Thomas Mayhew asked Ninigret to allow him to preach to his tribe, and he replied: "Go and make the English good first."

== Successors ==
Ninigret's daughter succeeded him as sachem. At her death, she was succeeded by her half-brother Ninigret, who granted a large portion of his people's lands to the colony of Rhode Island in 1709. This cession of land later created difficulties for the Niantics. The younger Ninigret died about 1722, leaving sons Charles Augustus and George. Charles Augustus died shortly afterward and left an infant son. Some of the tribe acknowledged the boy as their sachem, while another portion adhered to his uncle George, who assumed the entire government in 1735.

George's son Thomas Ninegret became chief in 1746. He sold additional Niantic lands to the colony of Rhode Island which caused discontentment among his people, some of whom tried to depose him. They appealed for relief to Sir William Johnson, the colonial superintendent of the Indians in the Northeast (he was based in upstate New York). They made the case that the Niantic lands which Thomas Ninegret had sold were needed to support the families of men who had died serving the English king in the French and Indian War. In one letter to Johnson, they addressed the question of whether they had the authority to depose a sachem: “As it was in the power of the nation to put him in, we think it in the power of the nation to turn him out.” The controversy continued for several years, but Rhode Island ultimately obtained the lands.

A small remnant of the Niantic people were still living in Rhode Island in 1812. The tribe no longer exists, but some descendants are still among the residents of New England today.

== Eponyms ==
Ninigret National Wildlife Refuge

- Fort Ninigret
- Ninigret Pond
- Ninigret Park
- Ninigret Beach
- Ninigret Cove (in Quonochontaug Pond, at the Charlestown/Westerly border)

The local oysters are referred to as Ninigret Nectars. They are smaller than most other oysters from New England.
