= Niantic people =

Historic Native American tribe in Connecticut

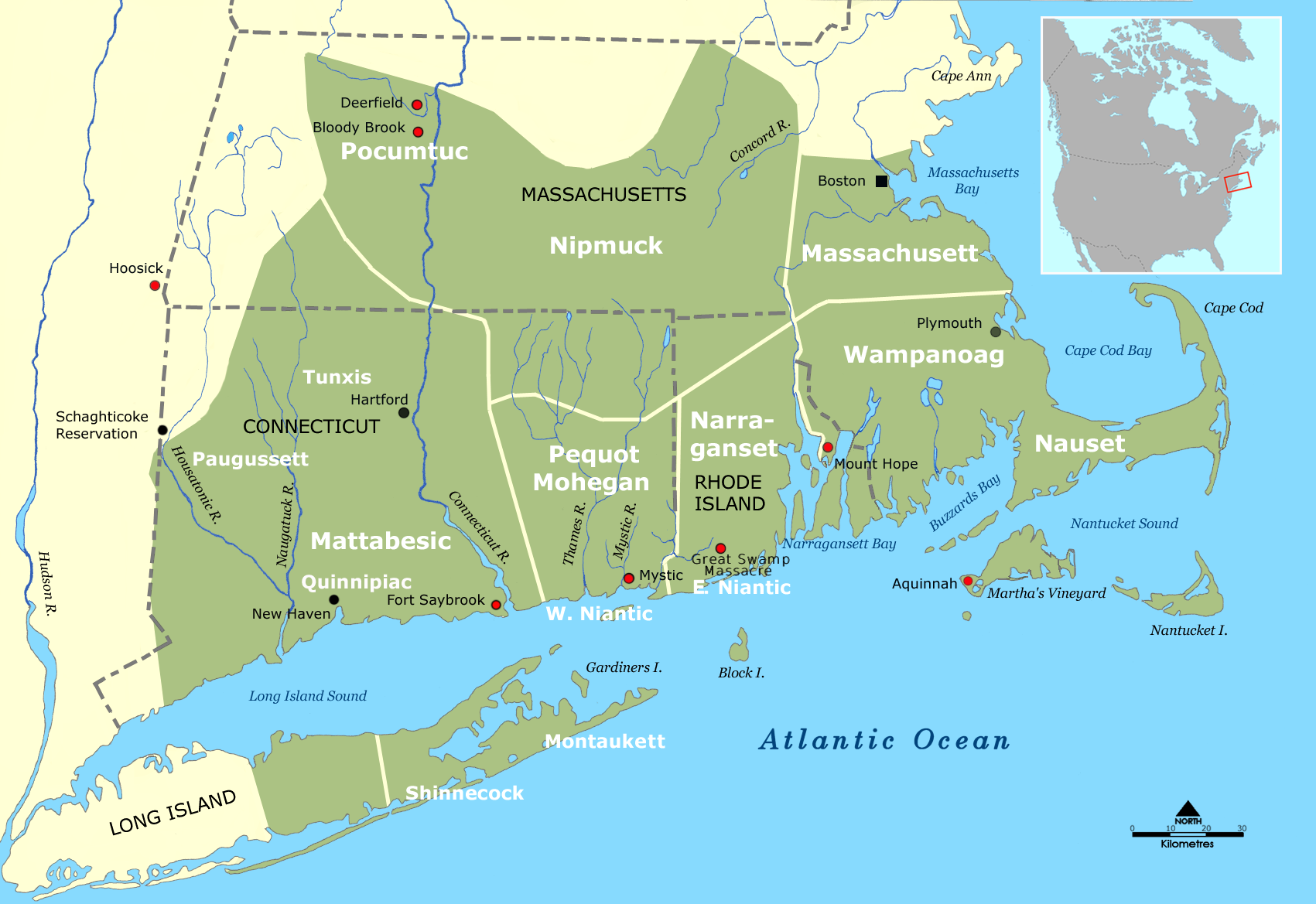
- Niantic tribe's territory in southern New England

Regions with significant populations
- New England

Languages
- Narragansett language

Religion
- Indigenous religion

Related ethnic groups
- Narragansett people

The Niantic (/naɪˈæntɪk/ ny-AN-tik; Nehântick or Nehantucket) are a tribe of Algonquian-speaking American Indians who lived in the area of Connecticut and Rhode Island during the early colonial period. The tribe's name Nehântick means "of long-necked waters"; area residents believe that this refers to the "long neck" or peninsula of land known as Black Point, located in the village of Niantic, Connecticut.

The Niantic people were divided into eastern and western groups due to intrusions by the more numerous and powerful Pequots. The Western Niantics were subject to the Pequots and lived just east of the mouth of the Connecticut River, while the Eastern Niantics became very close allies to the Narragansetts. It is likely that the name Nantucket is derived from the tribe's endonym, Nehantucket.

The division of the Niantics became so great that the language of the eastern Niantics is classified as a dialect of Narragansett, while the language of the western Niantics is classified as Mohegan-Pequot. Today, only western Nehantics are known to exist, in the area of coastal New London County, Connecticut.

== Language ==
The Niantics spoke an Algonquian Y-dialect similar to their neighbors the Pequots, Mohegans, and Narragansetts in New England, and the Montauks on eastern Long Island.

== Lifeways ==
Prior to European colonization of their lands, the Niantics spent their summers fishing and digging the shellfish which were abundant there and for which the area is famous. They cultivated the Three Sisters: maize, beans, and squash. They also hunted, fished, and collected nuts, roots, and fruits. During the Late Woodland period, they also dined on snake and turtle meat.

== History ==
=== Precontact history ===
Like the Narragansetts, the Niantics lived around salt ponds mainly in what is now coastal Rhode Island, in semi-permanent settlements or dispersed villages. Socially, the Niantic community valued both personal autonomy and group unity, with individual families responsible for providing for themselves. They crafted shell artworks but did not create too many projectile points, showing similar shared culture extending from southern Connecticut to Long Island to Martha's Vineyard. The arrival of the Mohegan and Pequot peoples in the southeastern Connecticut region led to the split of the Niantic people into Western Niantic and Eastern Niantic divisions.

=== 17th century ===
By the time European settlers arrived in southern Rhode Island in 1636, the Niantic and Narragansett peoples were closely related, both in terms of sociopolitics and family groups. The Eastern Niantic population, led by Ninigret, lived primarily in the areas of present-day Westerly, Rhode Island, and Charlestown, Rhode Island.

Some members of the Mohegans can trace their ancestry back to the Niantics, especially in the vicinity of Lyme, Connecticut. Following King Philip's War (1675–1676), the Narragansetts were reduced in population from 5,000 to a few hundred, while Eastern Niantics were largely spared due to Ninigret's neutrality during the conflict. Surviving Narragansetts fled to the Eastern Niantics in such great numbers that the tribe became known as the Narragansetts. Eastern Niantics continued to lead the joined tribes; by 1679, Ninigret had been succeeded by his daughter Weunquest, who died circa 1686.

=== 18th century ===
Entering the 18th century, the Eastern Niantic-Narragansett community in Rhode Island was one of the largest in Southern New England, with 300-500 Eastern Niantics outnumbering the surviving Narragansetts. Weunquest's half-brother Ninigret II succeeded her, and under his leadership, the Niantic-Narragansetts received their reservation in 1709. He died in 1723, by which time the Eastern Niantics were fully known as Narragansetts. Alcoholism, political infighting, and pressure from the European settlers in the area began to harm the tribe, with population shrinking to 51 families by 1730.

By the autumn of 1713, Christian missionaries had begun to try converting Eastern Niantics to Christianity, though they were met with resistance. In the 1720s, a more concentrated, organized effort began, but success was largely limited to those Eastern Niantics who had been taken as household servants and slaves by European families. Widespread interest in Christianity did not begin amongst the Western or Eastern Niantics until 1743, after which distinct congregations formed for each group.

In 1733, Western Niantics travelled to Woodstock, Connecticut, from East Lyme, Connecticut, in order "to barter their skins and furs for powder, shot, rings, knives, cloth, pipes, tobacco, beads, lace, whistle and other commodities" with local merchants.

In October 1761, Ezra Stiles encountered a Western Niantic community of 85 people, including 56 children, in the present-day village of Niantic. He sketched their wigwams and noted similarities between the design they used and those used by the Kickapoo. He further reported that 11 Niantic men had been killed between 1755-1761 while serving with colonial troops.

By the end of the 1700s, the Niantic peoples had adopted many aspects of Yankee New England culture, including adopting the dominant culture's religious beliefs, style of dress, and class system. In 1780, residents of New Shoreham, Rhode Island, voted to take Eastern Niantic-Narragansett land on the grounds that "the native Indians [are] extinct in [this] Town."

=== 19th century ===
Following the American Revolution, numerous Eastern Niantic families fled west and joined the Brotherton Indians in New York and eventually Wisconsin. Those that remained were often seen by political leaders as separate from the white community but also not as Indigenous, resulting in Niantics being listed as "Black" or "Negro" in Rhode Island town records, a reclassification that would make it difficult for them to maintain their claim on their ancestral lands.

By 1870, the Western Niantics were declared extinct by the state of Connecticut, which sold their 300-acre (1.2 km^{2}) reservation on the Black Point peninsula of East Lyme. In 1886, the state sold their burial ground, which was desecrated. The Crescent beach community was developed on top of this area. Niantic skeletal remains have been uncovered during excavation for new construction projects over the years, as recently as 1988.

In 1880, the Eastern Niantic-Narragansett reservation was sold to the state of Rhode Island, with only the church remaining under their control.

=== 20th century ===
In the early 20th century, Mohegan people of southeastern Connecticut considered Western Niantic peoples to be amongst their elders, turning to them for additional guidance on sacred traditions, medicine, symbolism, and tribal history.

In the 1930s, Niantics attended a gathering at Mashapaug Pond in Providence, Rhode Island that also included Narragansetts, Nipmucks, Wampanoags, Passamaquoddys, and Misquamicuts.

In 1998, about 35 Connecticut families claiming Niantic descent incorporated as the Nehantic Tribe and Nation nonprofit association. They established a three-person governing board, researched their history more fully, and began the petition process of seeking recognition from the federal government as an Indian tribe.

== Notable Niantic people ==
- Ninigret, a Niantic sachem
- Harman Garrett, Niantic governor and sachem
- Doug Smith (pitcher) (1892–1973), former MLB baseball player

== See also ==
- List of early settlers of Rhode Island
