= Quinebaug Trail =

Hiking trail in Connecticut, United States

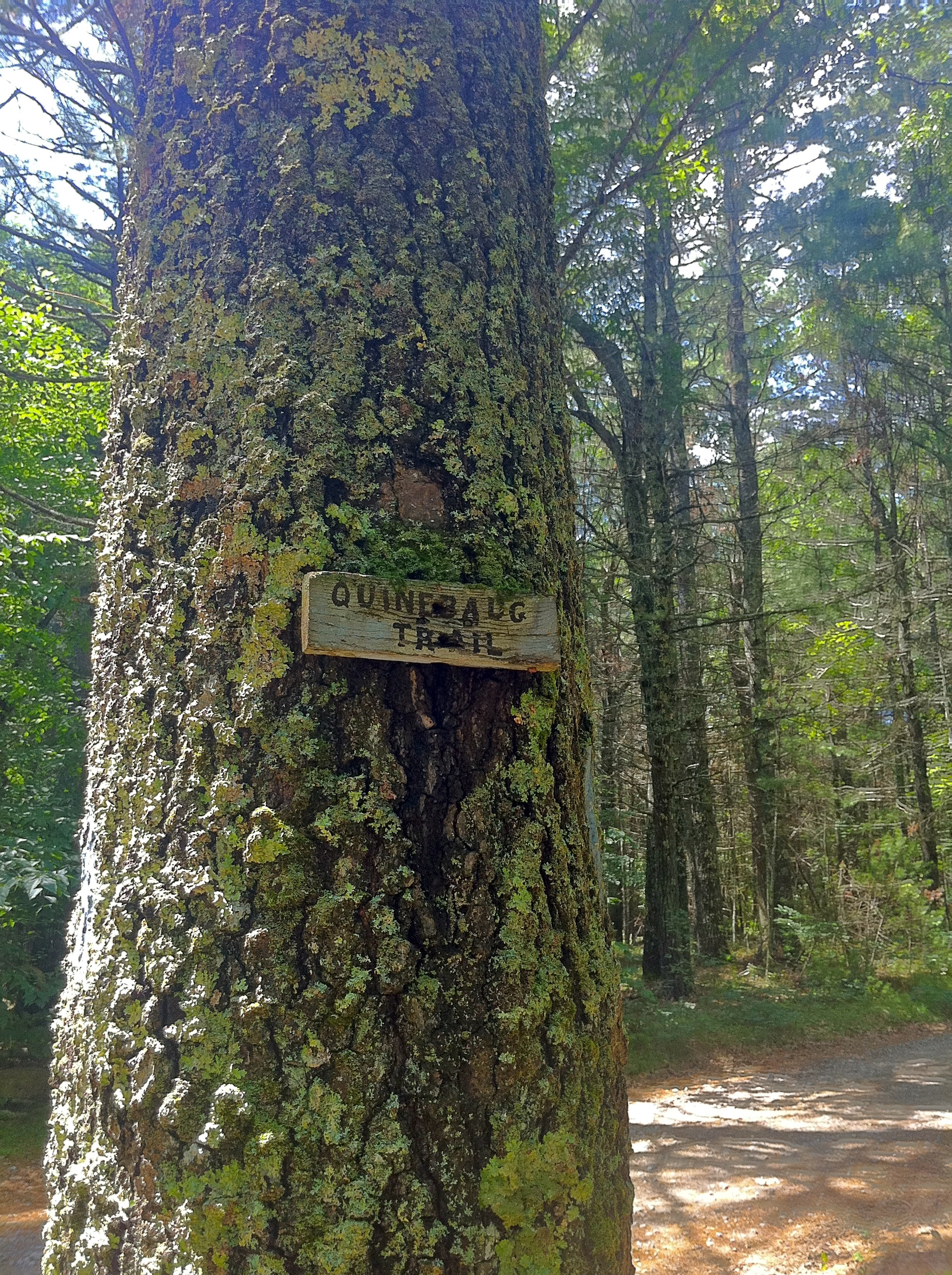
- Quinebaug Trail sign at junction with Hell Hollow Road at Phillips Pond.
- Length: 8.1 miles (13.0 km)
- Location: Connecticut
- Designation: CFPA Blue-Blazed Trail
- Use: Hiking, running, cross-country skiing, snowshoeing
- Highest point: Flat Rock Road, 600 ft (180 m)
- Lowest point: Hell Hollow Pond
- Sights: Devil's Den
- Hazards: Hunters, deer ticks, poison ivy, biting insects, snakes

The Quinebaug Trail is a 8.1-mile (13.0 km) Connecticut hiking trail and is one of the Blue-Blazed hiking trails maintained by the Connecticut Forest and Park Association.

The trail is located in the towns of Griswold, Voluntown and Plainfield in eastern Connecticut and is almost entirely within the Pachaug State Forest.

== Trail description ==
The Quinebaug Trail is a Blue-Blazed hiking trail and extends from Breakneck Road near the intersection with Lee Road in Griswold, Connecticut, to northern Spaulding Road in Plainfield. Most of the Quinebaug Trail is on state land within the Pachaug State Forest. It connects to one small public recreation area maintained by the Connecticut Department of Environmental Protection at Phillips Pond.

Much of the Quinebaug Trail is flat or has gradual ascents and descents and is suitable for casual walking or hiking, running - or snowshoeing in the winter. The steepest section is where the trail traverses the closed section of Flat Rock Road. The Quinebaug Trail crosses streams and wetland areas that are subject to flooding in periods of significant rain and snow melt. In particular the trail sections close to Hell Hollow Pond and Lockes Meadow Pond are low-lying areas which are often under water.

The trail connects to other Blue-Blazed trails in Connecticut's Pachaug State Forest: the Pachaug Trail in the Philips Pond through Flat Rock section, and the Nehantic Trail at Lee Road. The Nehantic-Quinebaug Crossover trail is an overlapping section of Lee and Breakneck Roads connecting these two trails and is marked with blue and red blazes (a blue blaze with a red bar in the lower half of the blaze). There are three connector trails from the Quinebaug to the Pachaug trail: The Quinebaug-Pachaug Crossover trail from the Quinebaug at Philips Pond to the Pachaug marked with blue and red blazes, the section of Hell Hollow Road between the two trails marked with blue and red blazes, and the Pachaug-Quinebaug Crossover trail marked with yellow blazes.

=== Trail route ===
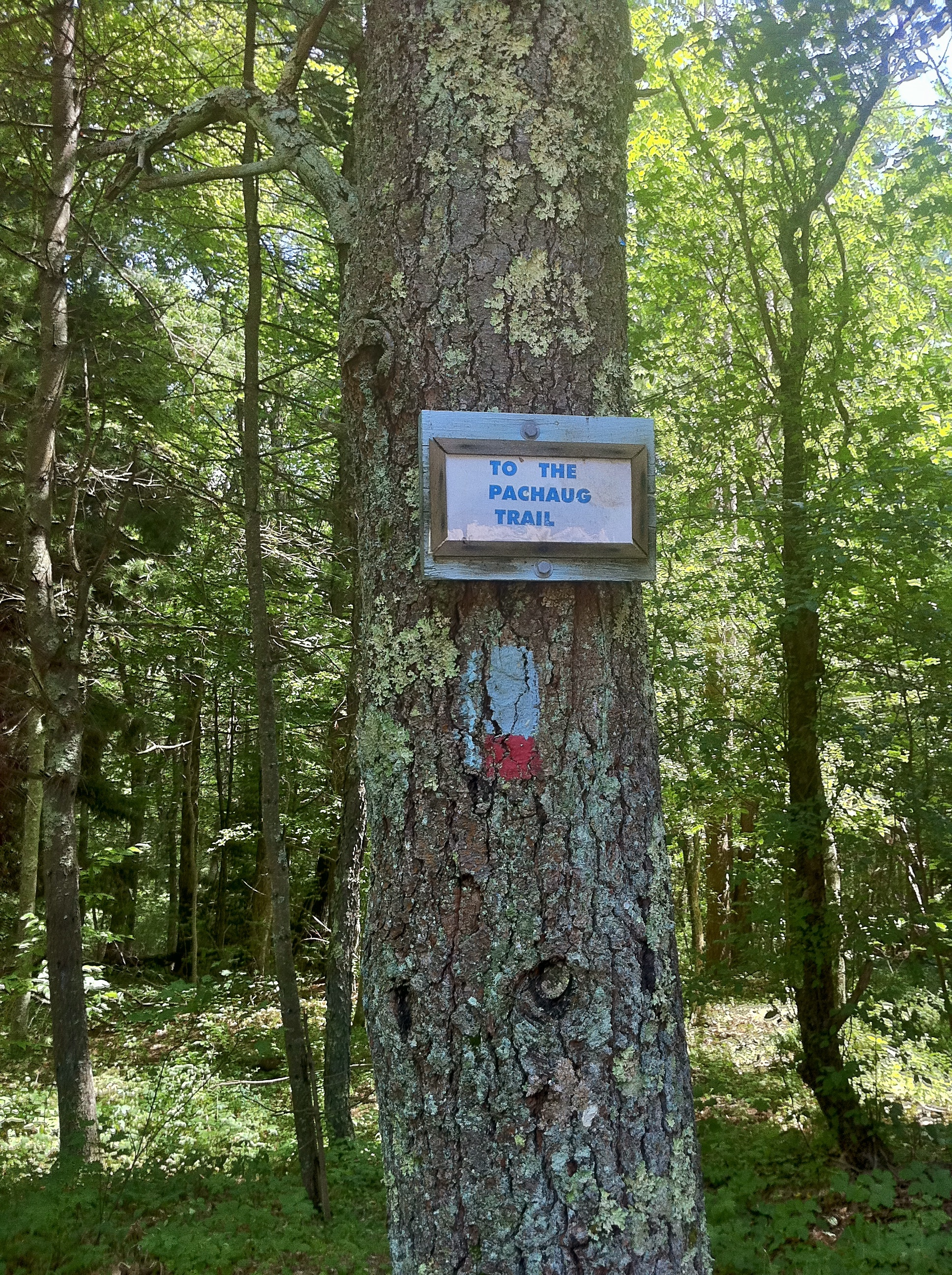
Quinebaug-Pachaug Connector Trail Sign at junction at Phillips Pond.

The southern end of the Quinebaug Trail starts on Breakneck Road in Griswold Connecticut, just north of the intersection with Lee Road and at the northern end of the Nehantic-Quinebaug Crossover trail. The trail leads generally north, connecting with the Quinebaug-Pachaug Crossover trail and Trail 1 forest road at Phillips Pond and then closely paralleling the Trail 1 forest road until crossing Hell Hollow Road to the west of Hell Hollow Pond. The trail continues through woods and then joins with the non-vehicular and closed section of Flat Road until they pass over the top of Flat Rock (41.65861°N 71.872°W). The trail diverge west of the Flat Rock "summit", with the Quinebaug Trail turning to the north to closely follow the western banks of Lockes Meadow Pond before veering north-west to its northern terminus on Spaulding road north of Dow Road in Plainfield Connecticut.

The connecting main and side trails provide numerous opportunities for loop hikes. Since parking is available at each of the recreation areas (subject to State DEP fees in peak season), extended through-hikes are also popular on this trail.

=== Trail communities ===
The Quinebaug Trail passes through land located within the following Connecticut municipalities, from south to north: Griswold, Voluntown and Plainfield

== Landscape, geology, and natural environment ==
Landscape in the area is generally low-lying and flat with some rolling hills. The most prominent features are the Flat Rock (a closed extension of Flat Rock Road) and the Devil's Den rocks (accessible via an unmarked trail at the eastern end of the Flat Rock section).

Pachaug State Forest features large extents of undeveloped land, consisting of mature growths of hardwood and evergreens, along with swampy areas having extensive coverage by Mountain Laurel and other shrubs and smaller trees.

== History and folklore ==
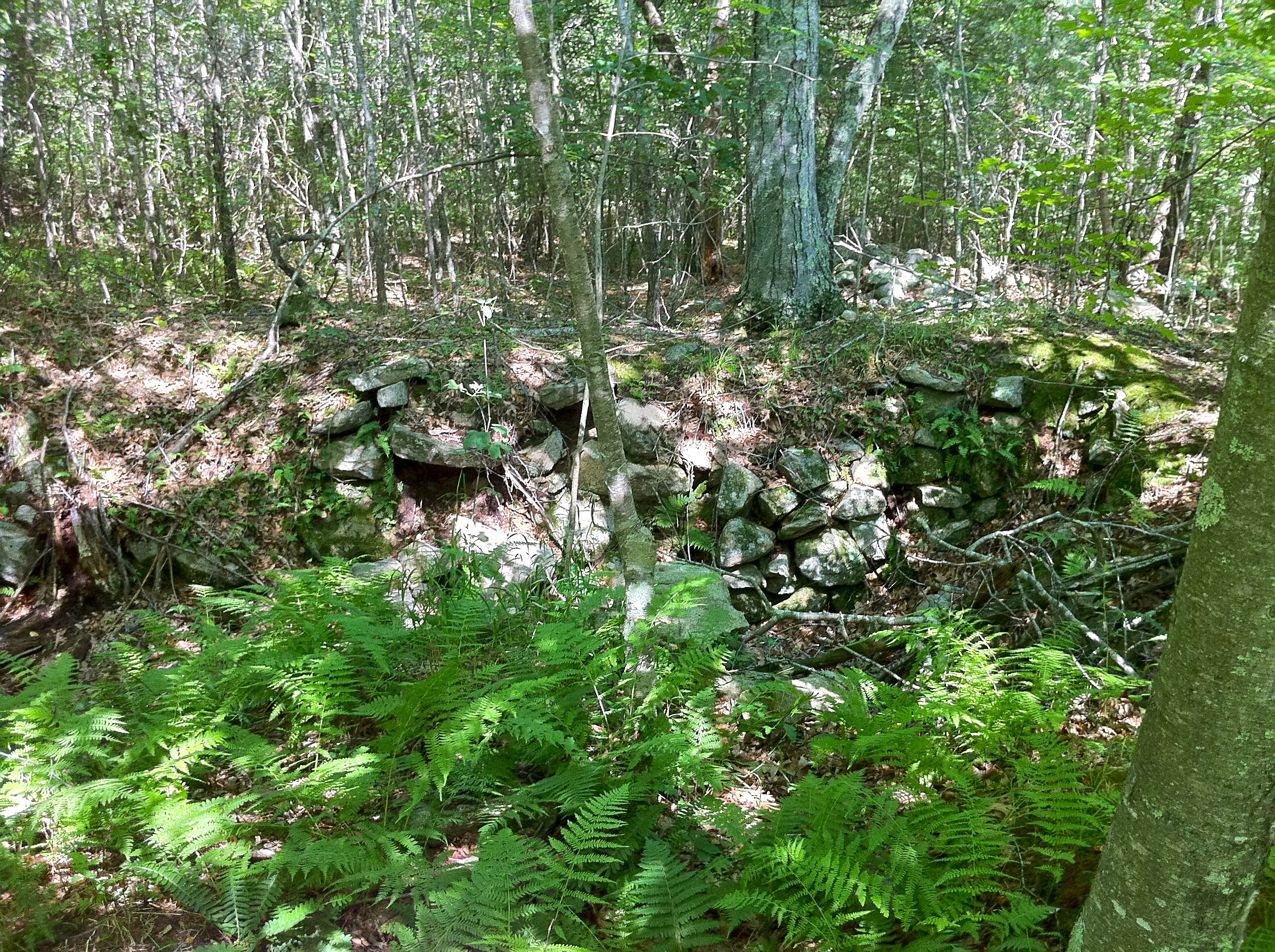
Stone foundation ruins north of Hell Hollow Pond on Quinebaug Trail.

The Blue-Blazed Quinebaug Trail was created by the Connecticut Forest and Park Association as part of the Blue-Blazed Hiking Trail system.

=== Origin and name ===
The original Blue-Blazed Hiking Trails were named after Native American people and place names, in recognition that many of the trails followed historic foot paths. Trails added since often follow this convention, so many of the BBHT's have Native American names.

The Quinebaug were a tribe of Algonquian speaking people occupying the watershed of the current Quinebaug River in Southern New England in the early colonial period of the region.

"Quinebaug" was also the name by which the area was known as well as the official name of the town when it was incorporated in 1699. The Town of Quinebaug was renamed Plainfield the following year (1700) and in 1703 the Town of Canterbury (the area of Plainfield west of the Quinebaug River) split off as a separate municipality. The name Plainfield refers to the extensive deforestation and subsequent numerous fields for farming which populated the area in the seventeenth, eighteenth and early nineteenth centuries.

The Quinebaug River runs north to south from Sturbridge, Massachusetts, through the western border of Plainfield joining the Shetucket River in Norwich, Connecticut, just north of the Shetucket joining Connecticut's Thames River (Connecticut).

=== Historic sites ===
The foundations for stone cellars that can be found along the route indicate that much of the landscape was used for settlements and farms up until the late nineteenth and early twentieth century, after which much of the land was allowed to return to forests. In particular stone foundations and extensive stone walls can be found off of the trail in the Hell Hollow Road and Pond area.

Pachaug State Forest was the first state forest in Connecticut and grew quickly in acreage primarily because many of the farmers and landholders in the area realized that their soil was poor for farming and sold their land to the state in the 1920s and 1930s.

=== Folklore ===
The town name of Voluntown is attributed to the fact that it was settled by Volunteers of the Narragansett War in 1700 who received land grants to settle there. The land was remote and difficult to farm and many of the original settlements were subsequently abandoned, so stone walls and foundations can be found throughout the forest today. The inhospitality of the land has been cited as the origin for the name "Hell Hollow" and there are theories regarding the naming of the Devil's Den rock formation near Flat Rock.

There are several unsubstantiated legends and ghost stories which surround the Hell Hollow area including a false claim of witchcraft involving a young girl named Maud Reynolds who died before her second birthday in 1890. Officially she died of diphtheria. She was buried across in the family cemetery on one side of Hell Hollow Road. However, because her gravesite was periodically disturbed it was supposedly moved deep into the woods, and because the five-foot concrete cross grave marker was periodically stolen it is now reportedly marked only with stones rather than a grave stone.

== Hiking the trail ==
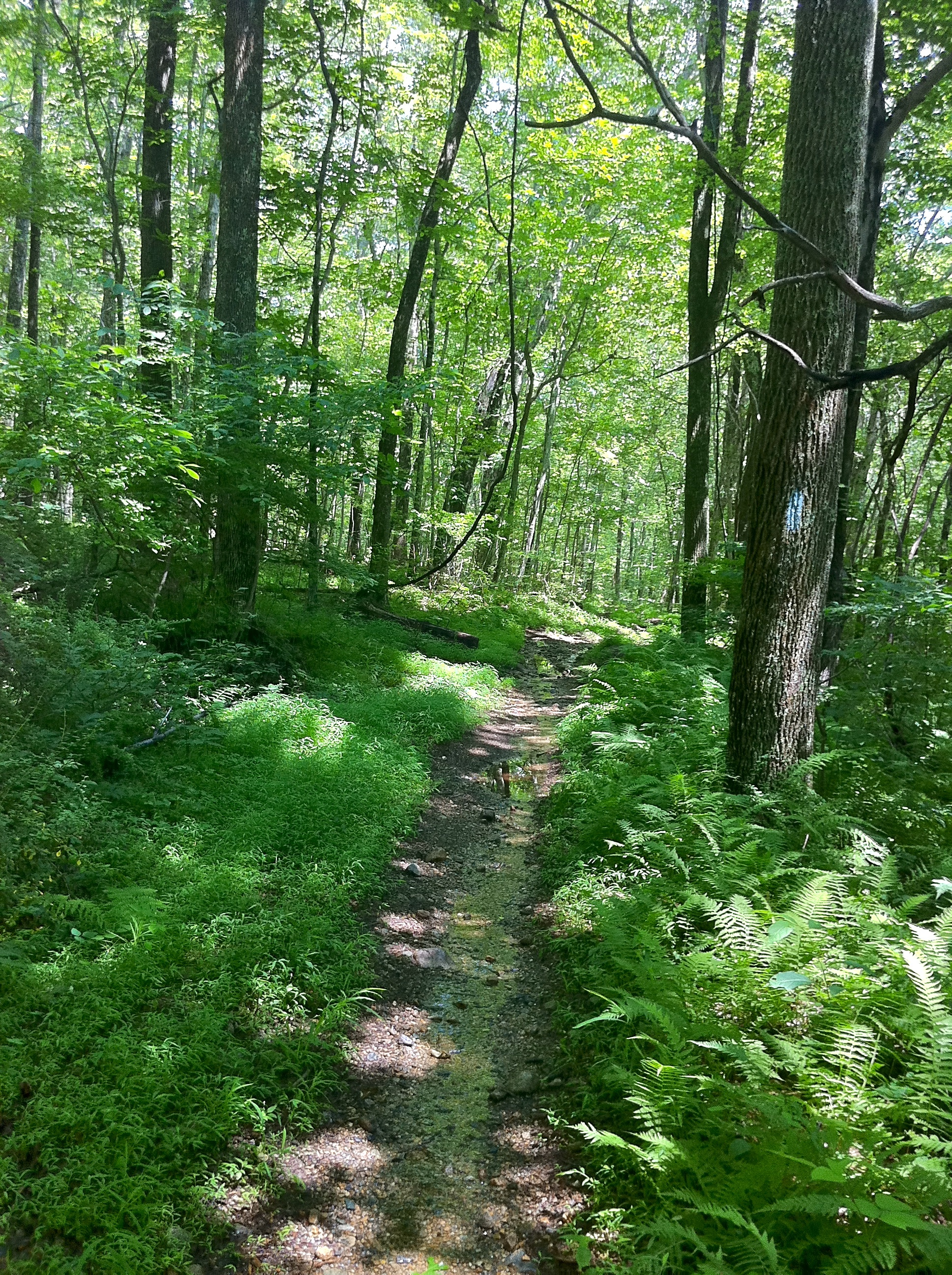
Quinebaug Trail just north of Breakneck Road southern terminus.

The mainline trail is blazed with blue rectangles. Trail descriptions are available from a number of commercial and non-commercial sources, and a complete guidebook is published by the Connecticut Forest and Park Association. More information can be found on the CFPA website (CFPA Interactive map) including updates on trail conditions and closure or restrictions. Contact information is also available on the site for trail users to report adverse trail conditions or submit other feedback or questions.

Weather along the route is typical of Connecticut. Conditions on exposed ridge tops and summits may be harsher during cold or stormy weather. Lightning is a hazard on exposed summits and ledges during thunderstorms. Snow is common in the winter and may necessitate the use of snowshoes. Ice can form on exposed ledges and summits, making hiking dangerous without special equipment.

Landscape is low-lying and trails cross wetland areas. Extensive rain and snow melt will lead to wet and muddy conditions, and in this case fairly high waterproof boots are recommended.

Biting insects can be bothersome during warm weather. Parasitic deer ticks (which are known to carry Lyme disease) are a potential hazard. Encounter with small wildlife is always possible and hikers should be alert to signs of erratic behavior or other disease symptoms and take evasive action if warranted.

Seasonal hunting is permitted on state forest land, so wearing bright orange clothing during the hunting season (Fall through December) is advised.

State regulations govern use of state forest land. The land, plants and animals should generally be left undisturbed, especially endangered and protected species.

== Conservation and maintenance of the trail corridor ==
Much of the trail is flooded or muddy. There are sections filled with stones and other evidence of erosion which has occurred when the trail has turned into a temporary stream.

There is also evidence of use by all terrain vehicles (ATVs), dirt bikes and horses. Some sections of the Quinebaug trail are explicitly multi-use (paved roads, dirt/gravel forest roads, jeep trails and the Enduro off-road motorcycle trail which winds through Pachaug State Forest), but in other sections there is clearly unauthorized vehicular and equestrian use.

The 58 mile Enduro trail in Pachaug State Forest is marked (on turns and intersections on trees) with white labels containing a red arrow pointing in the trail's direction. The route follows a mix of forest trails and public roads (therefore requiring both a valid current motorcycle registration and motorcycle driver's license rather than ATV registration).

== Image gallery ==
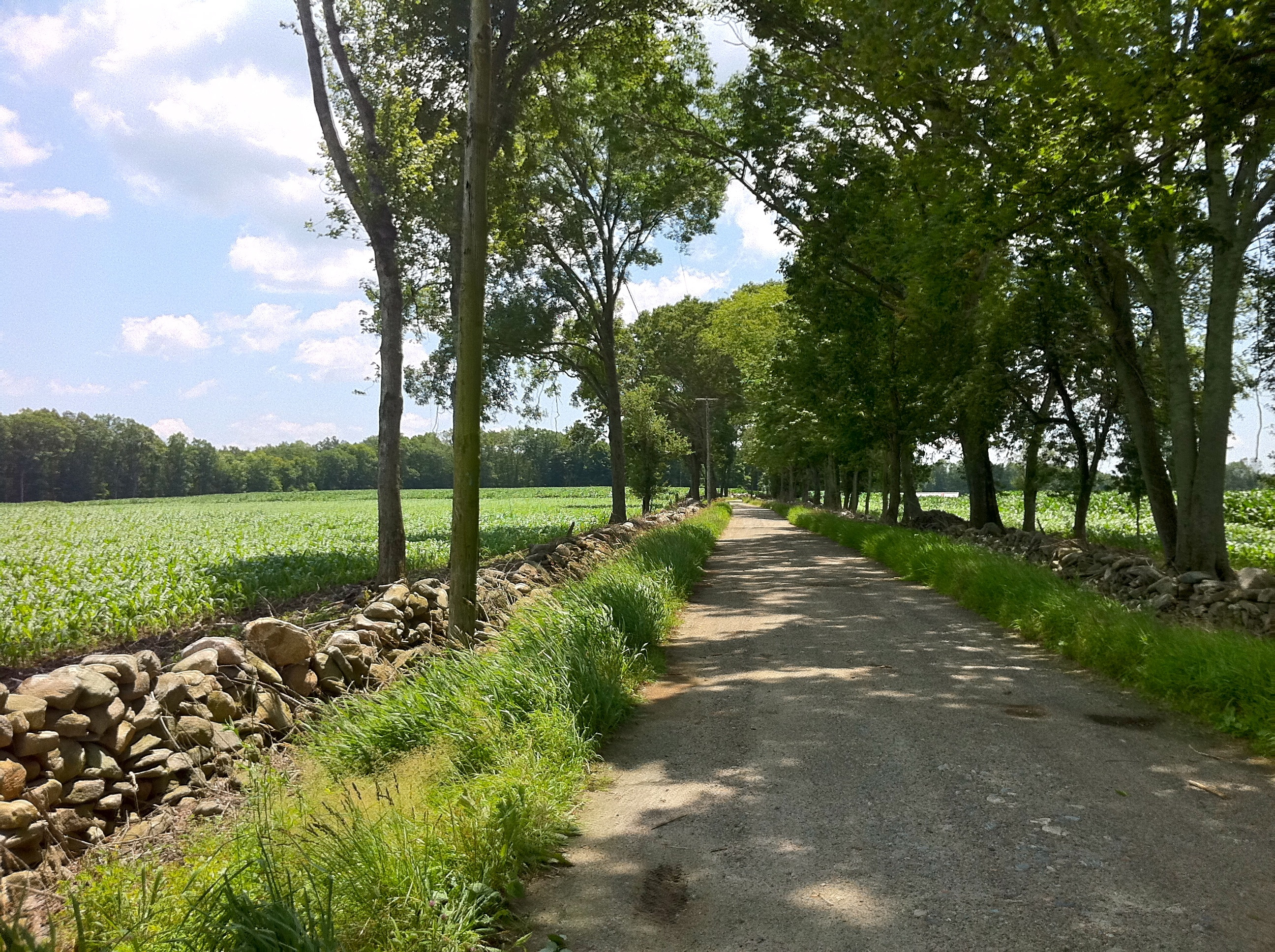
Quinebaug-Nehantic Crossover Trail's Lee Road section.

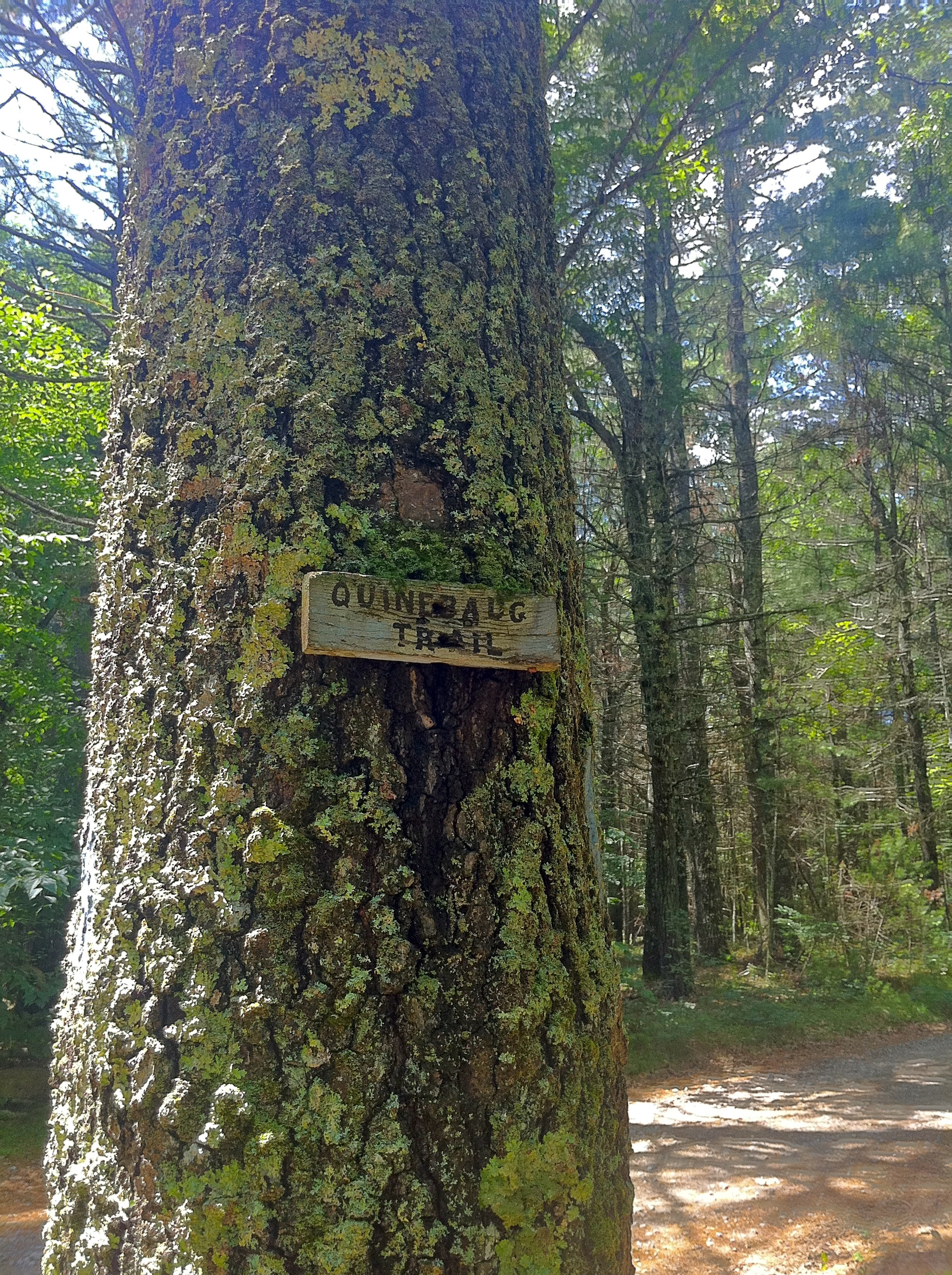
Quinebaug Trail Sign at junction with Hell Hollow Road at Phillips Pond.

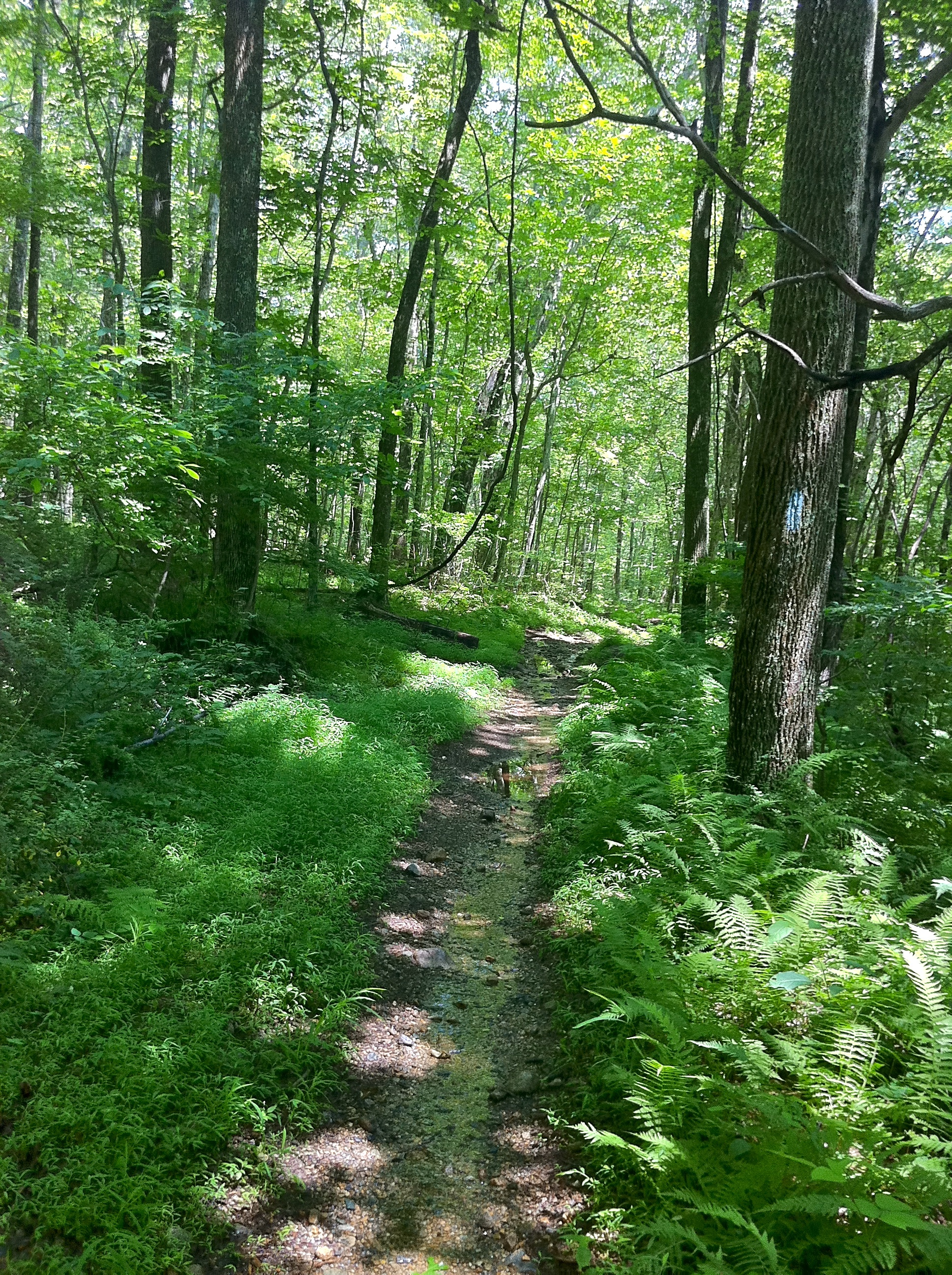
Quinebaug Trail north of Breakneck Road southern terminus.

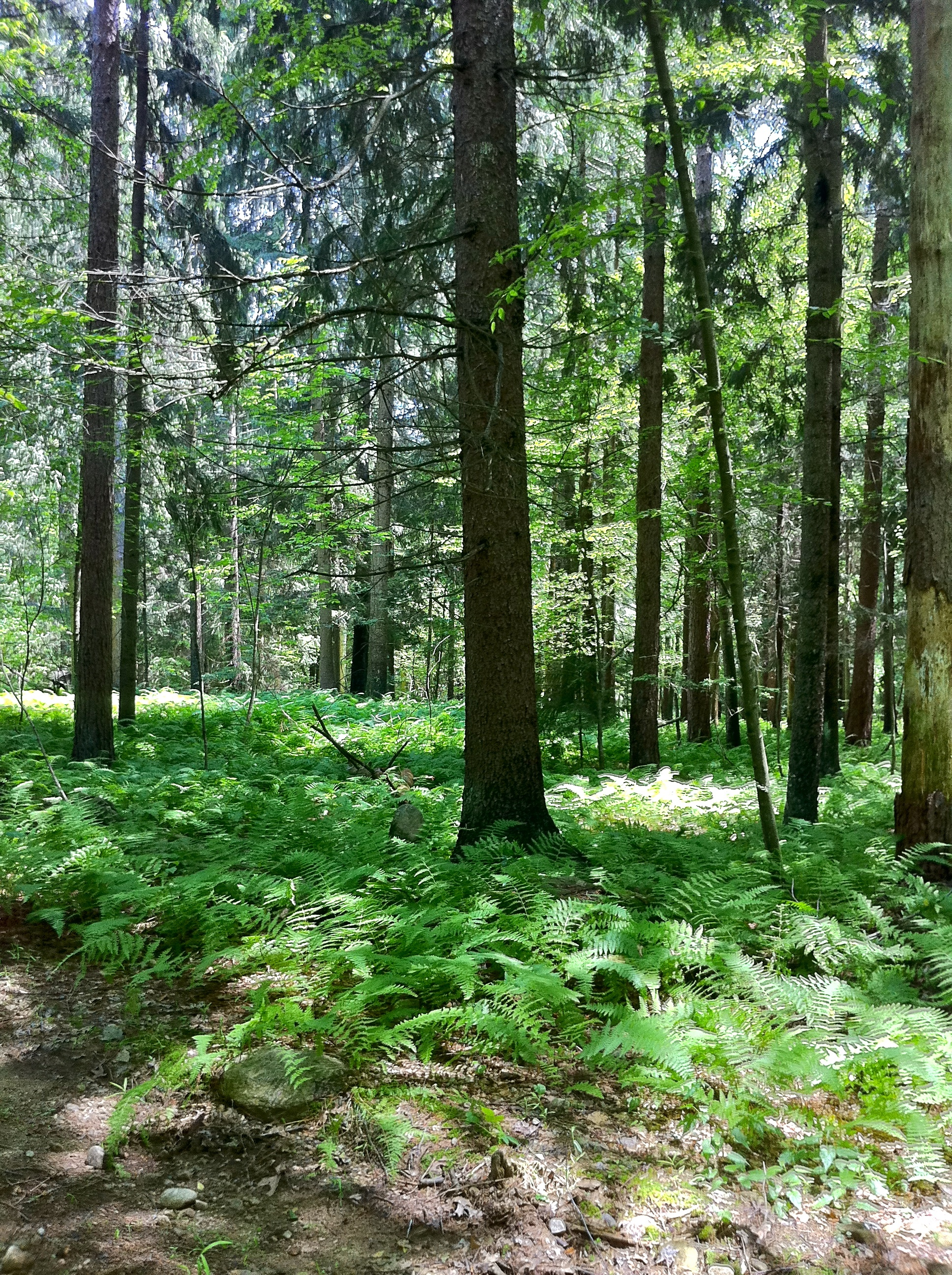
Quinebaug Trail between Breakneck Road and Trail 1 Road crossing at Phillips Pond.

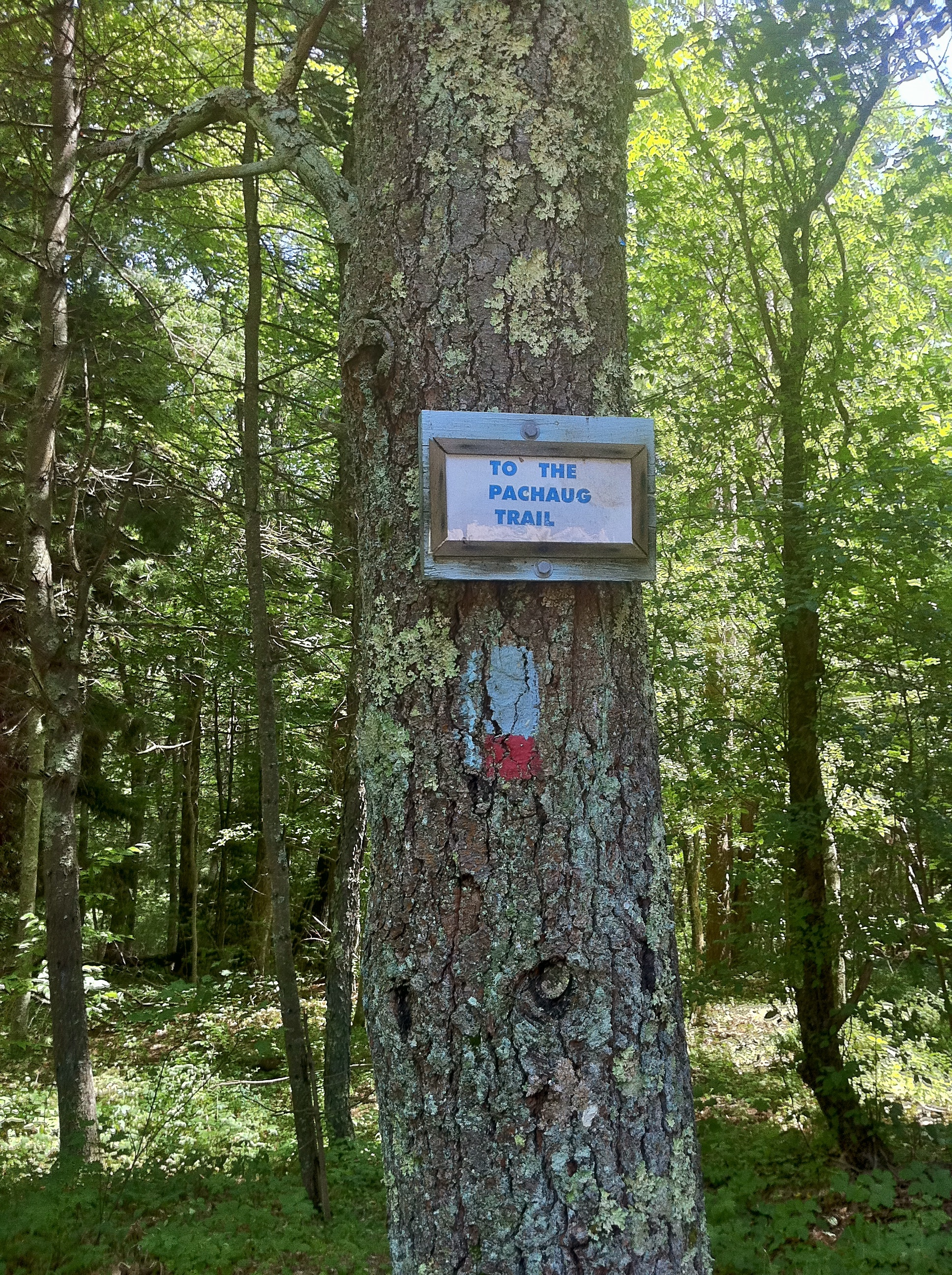
Quinebaug-Pachaug Connector Trail Sign at junction at Phillips Pond.

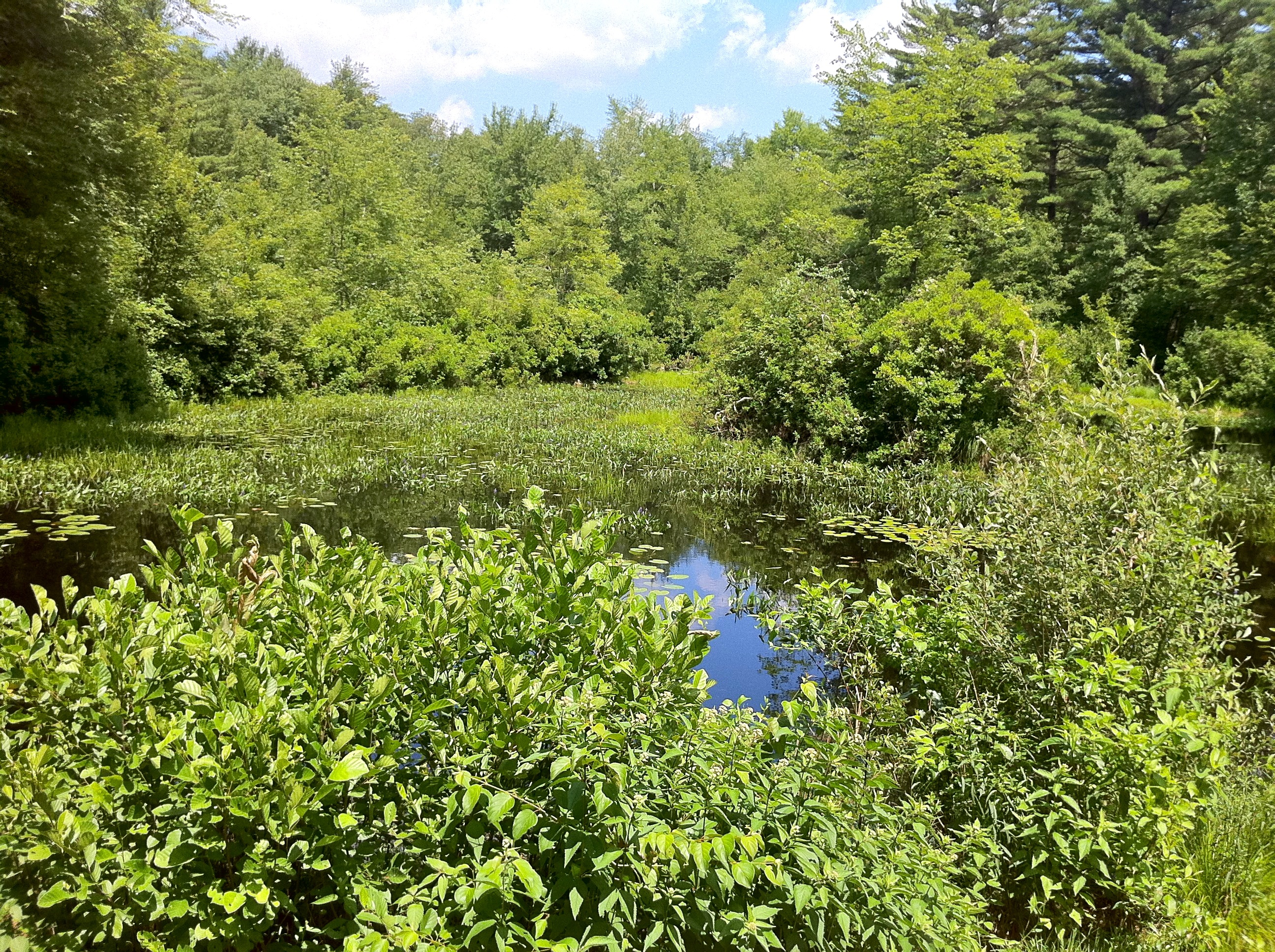
Phillips Pond at junction of Quinebaug Trail and Trail 1 Road.

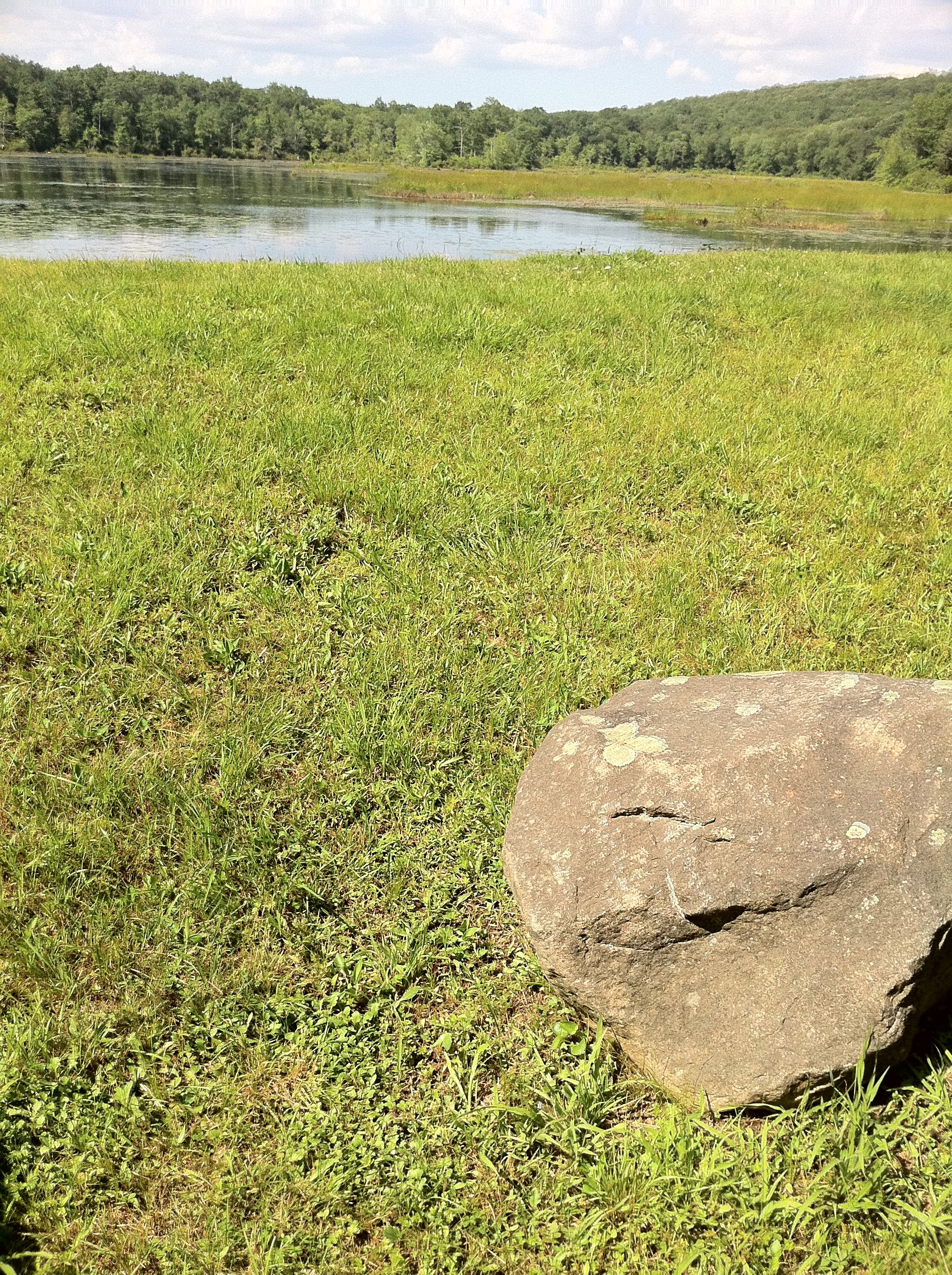
Quinebaug Trail - Hell Hollow Pond.

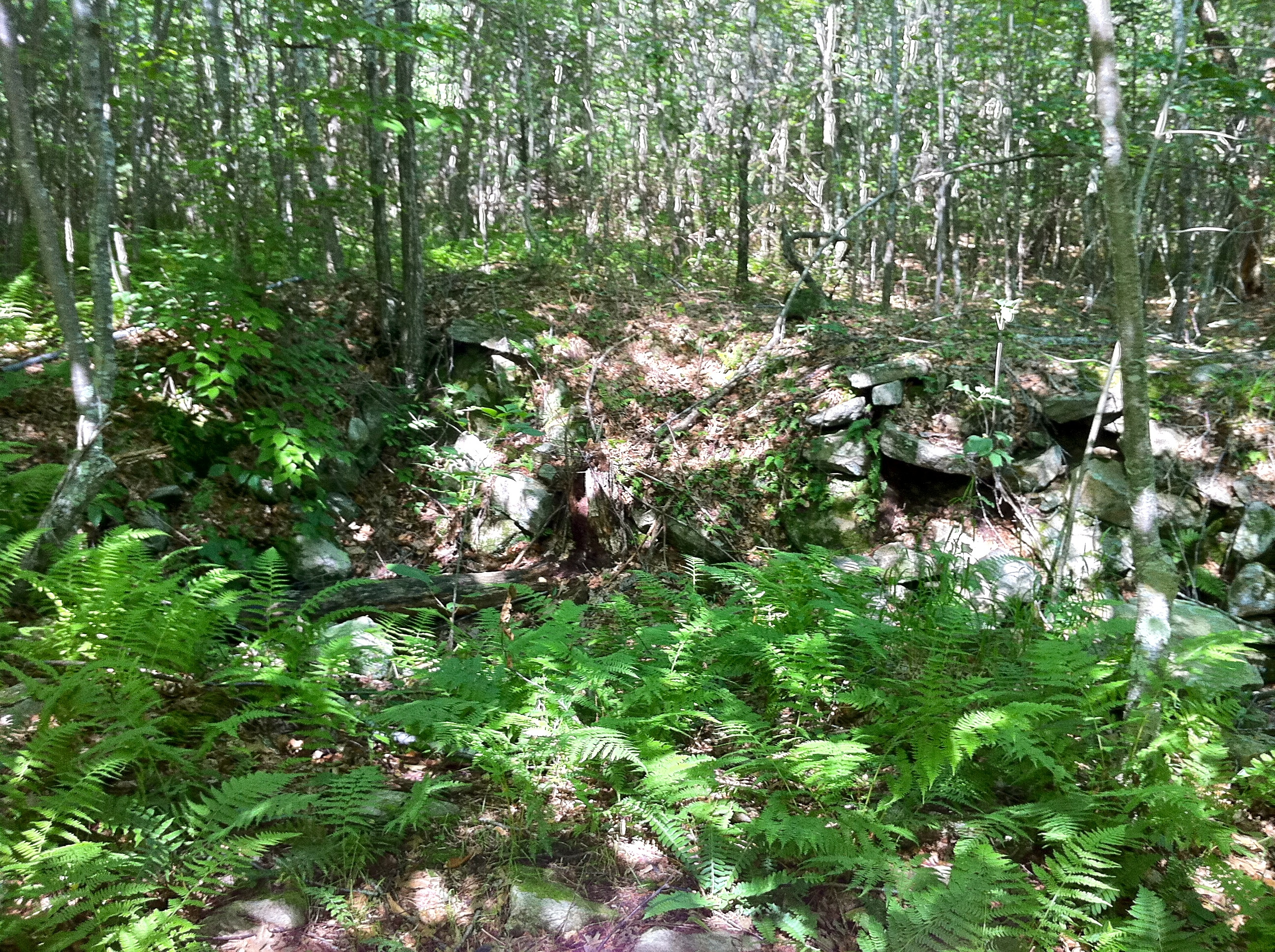
Quinebaug Trail - stone foundation ruins north of Hell Hollow Pond.

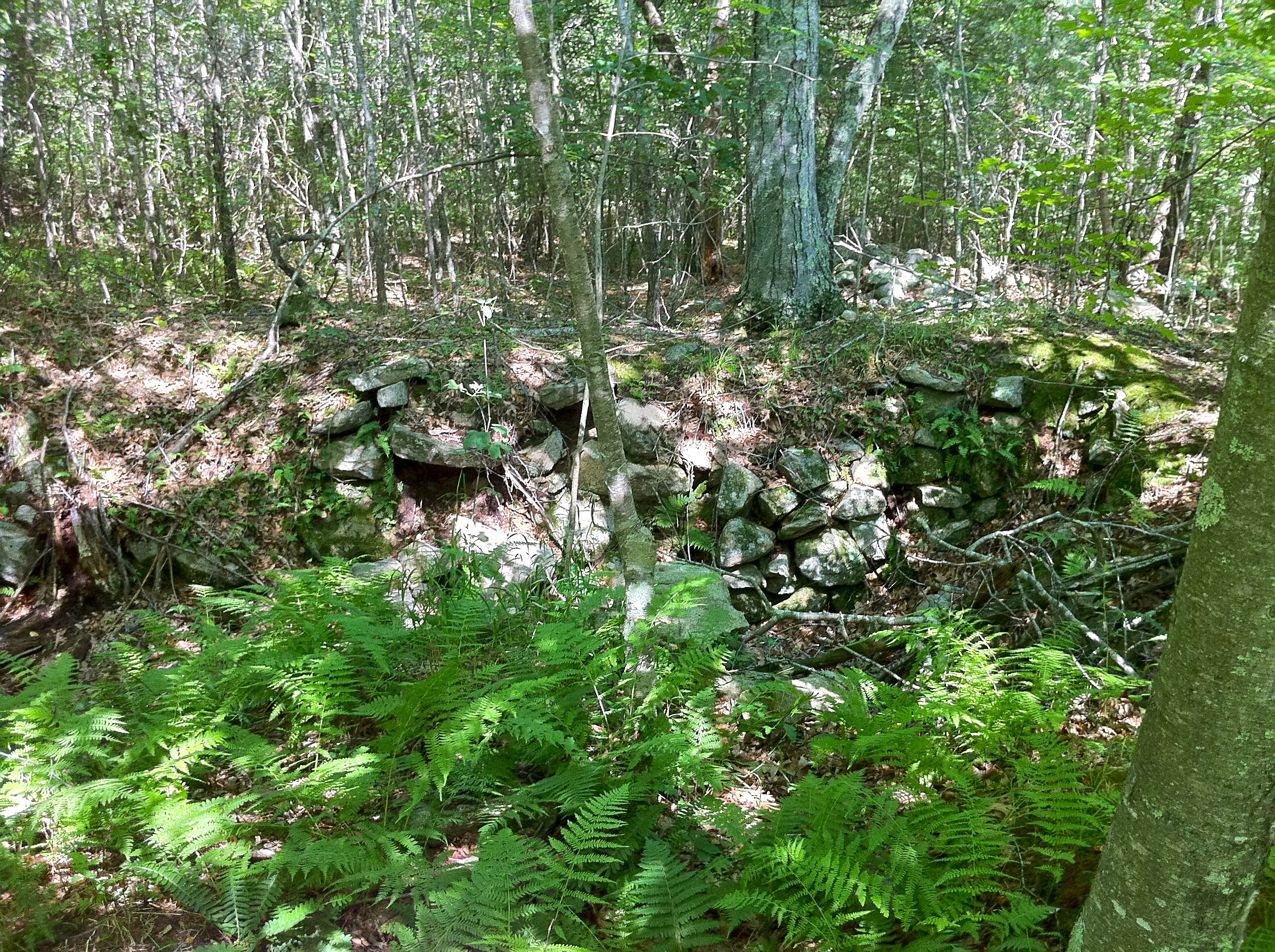
Quinebaug Trail - stone foundation ruins north of Hell Hollow Pond.

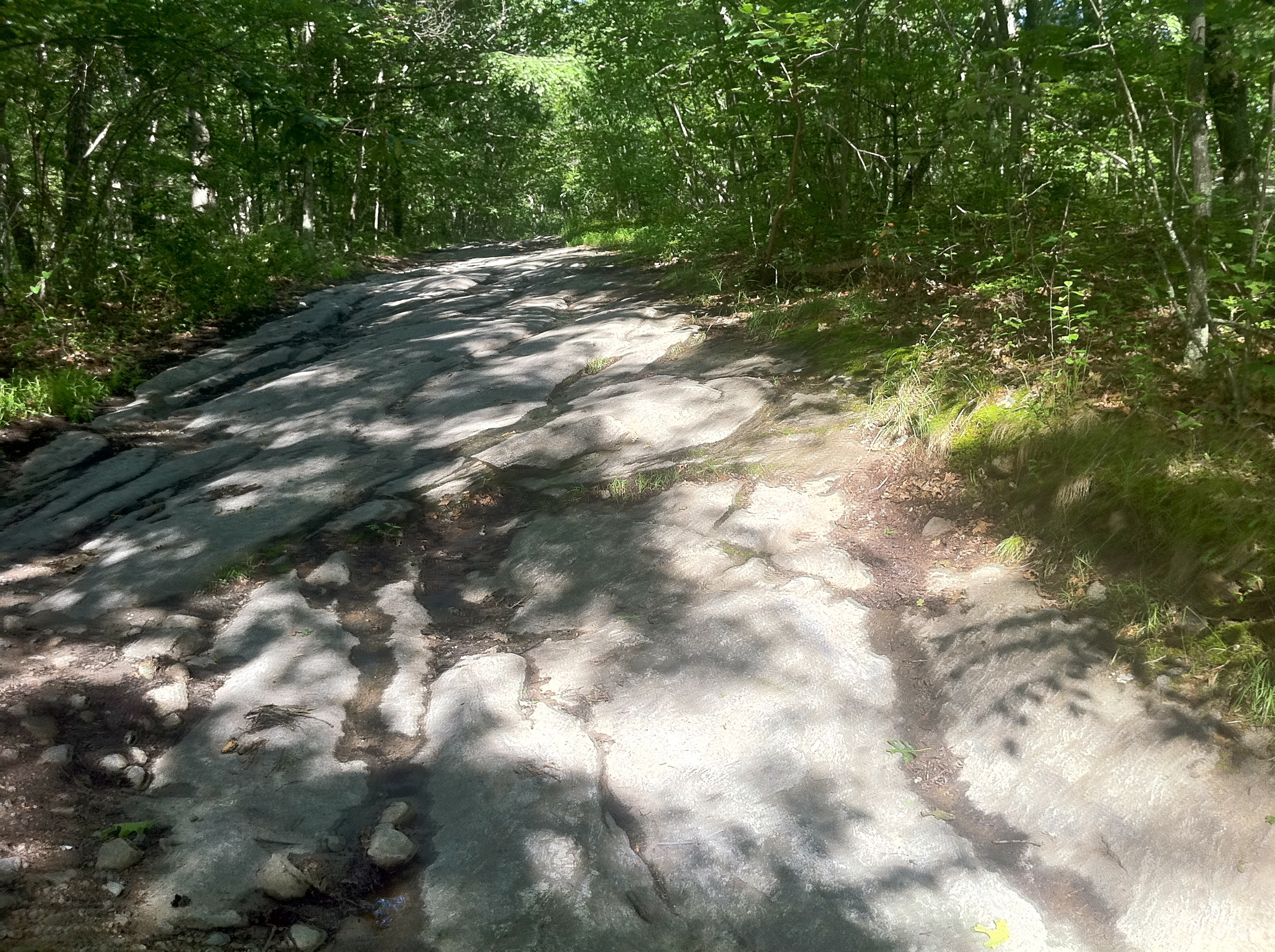
Flat Rock Road's Quinebaug Trail section is closed to vehicles.

== See also ==
- Blue-Blazed Trails
- Nehantic Trail
- Pachaug Trail
- Pachaug State Forest
