= Pachaug Trail =

Hiking trail in Connecticut, United States

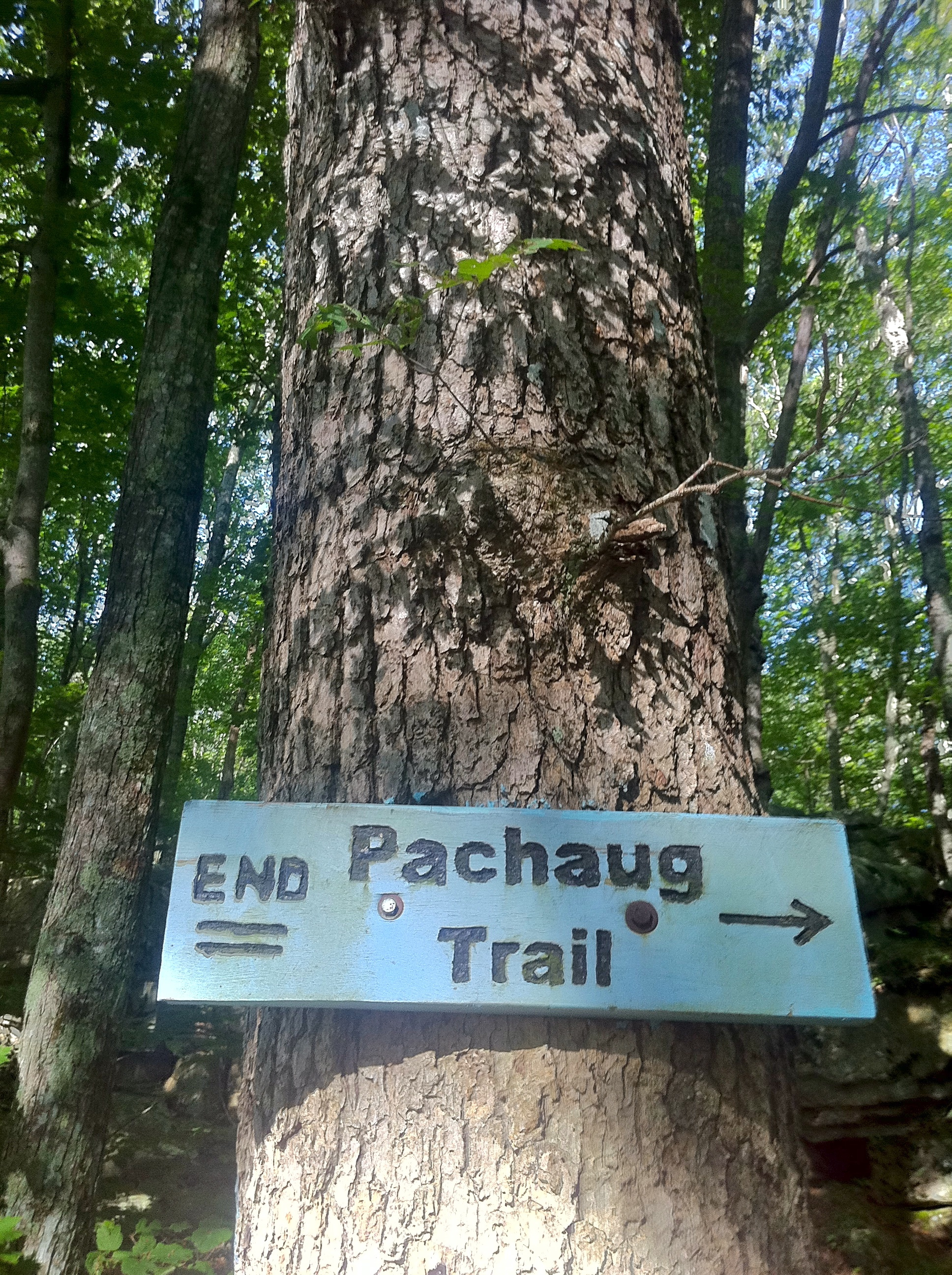
- Pachaug Trail – Terminus at Green Fall Pond, Voluntown, CT
- Length: 28 miles (45 km)
- Location: Connecticut
- Designation: CFPA Blue-Blazed Trail
- Use: Hiking, running, cross-country skiing, snowshoeing
- Highest point: Mount Misery, 600 ft (180 m)
- Lowest point: Hell Hollow Pond
- Sights: Devil's Den
- Hazards: Hunters, deer ticks, poison ivy, biting insects, snakes

The Pachaug Trail is a 28-mile (45 km) Connecticut hiking trail and is one of the Blue-Blazed hiking trails maintained by the Connecticut Forest and Park Association. It is a horseshoe shaped trail.

The trail is located in the towns of Voluntown in New London County and Sterling in Windham County in eastern Connecticut as well as Hopkinton, Rhode Island. The trail is mostly within the Pachaug State Forest.

The Pachaug Trail was a much larger trail in the 1930s and 1940s but it has been one of the Blue-Blazed Trails most drastically shrunk by post-World War 2 housing developments.

== Trail description ==
The Pachaug Trail is a Blue-Blazed hiking trail and extends from Breakneck Road near the intersection with Lee Road in Griswold, Connecticut, to northern Spaulding Road in Plainfield. Most of the Pachaug Trail is on state land within the Pachaug State Forest. It connects to public recreation areas maintained by the Connecticut Department of Environmental Protection at Green Falls Pond and Phillips Pond in Pachaug State Forest.

Much of the Pachaug Trail is flat or has gradual ascents and descents and is suitable for casual walking or hiking, running – or snowshoeing in the winter. The steepest section is where the trail traverses the closed section of Flat Rock Road. The Quinebaug Trail crosses streams and wetland areas that are subject to flooding in periods of significant rain and snow melt. In particular, the trail sections close to Hell Hollow Pond and Lockes Meadow Pond are low-lying areas which are often under water.

The trail connects to other Blue-Blazed trails in Connecticut's Pachaug State Forest: the Quinebaug Trail in the Philips Pond through Flat Rock section, and the Nehantic Trail at Green Falls Pond. The Nehantic and Pachaug trails overlap for a section which includes Mount Misery and the Chapman Management Area (which includes the Rhododendron Sanctuary Trail). Lee and Breakneck Roads connecting these two trails and is marked with blue and red blazes (a blue blaze with a red bar in the lower half of the blaze). There are three connector trails from the Quinebaug to the Pachaug trail: The Quinebaug-Pachaug Crossover trail from the Quinebaug at Philips Pond to the Pachaug marked with blue and red blazes, the section of Hell Hollow Road between the two trails marked with marked with blue and red blazes, and the Pachaug-Quinebaug Crossover trail marked with yellow blazes.

=== Trail route ===
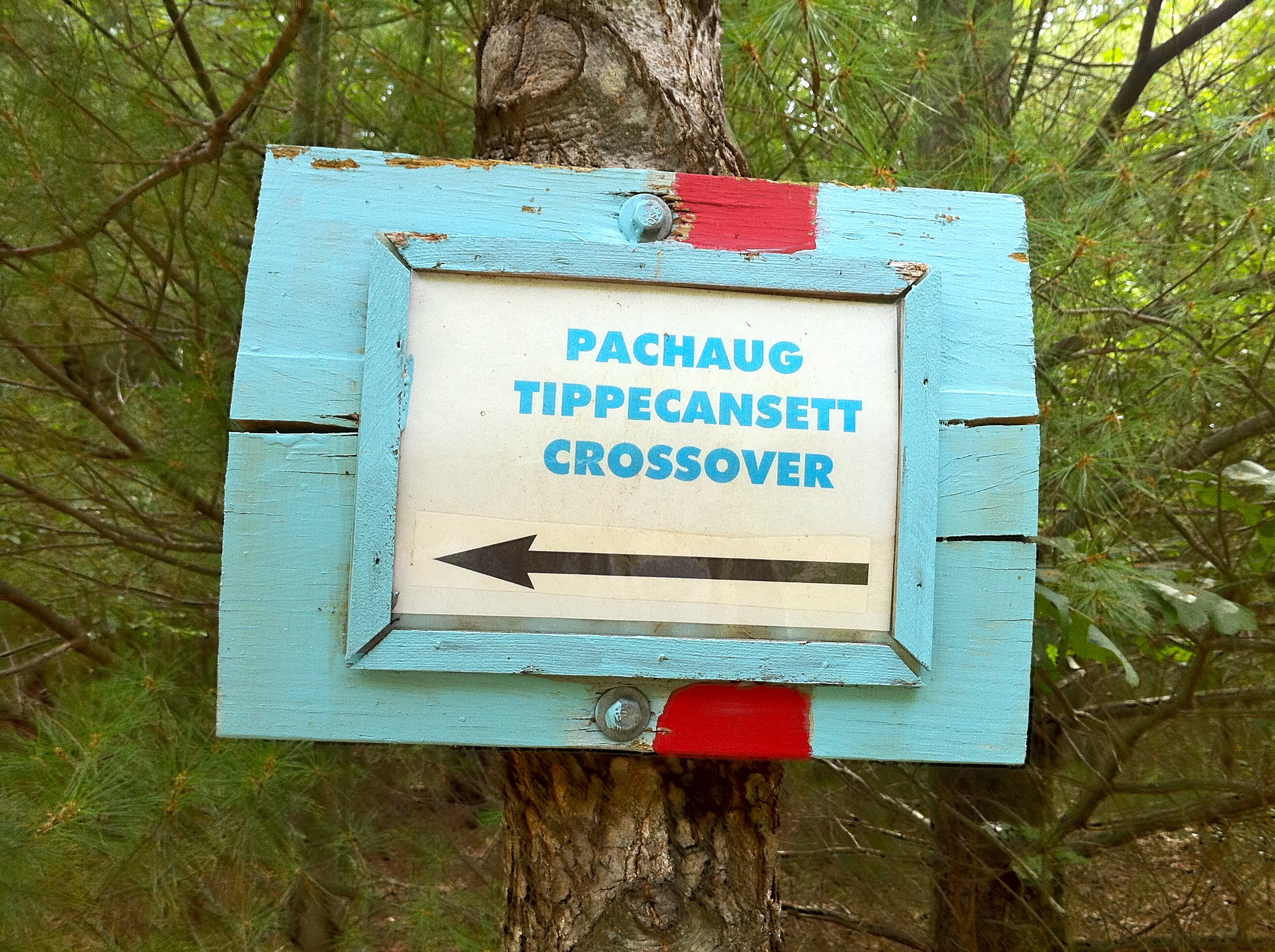
Pachaug-Tippecansett Connector Trail sign south of Noah Ark Road, Voluntown, CT

The southern end of the Pachaug Trail starts on Breakneck Road in Griswold Connecticut, just north of the intersection with Lee Road and at the northern end of the Nehantic-Quinebaug Crossover trail. The trail leads generally north, connecting with the Quinebaug-Pachaug Crossover trail and Trail 1 forest road at Phillips Pond and then closely paralleling the Trail 1 forest road until crossing Hell Hollow Road to the west of Hell Hollow Pond. The trail continues through woods and then joins with the non-vehicular and closed section of Flat Road until they pass over the top of Flat Rock (41.65861°N 71.872°W). The trail diverge west of the Flat Rock "summit", with the Quinebaug Trail turning to the north to closely follow the western banks of Lockes Meadow Pond before veering north-west to its northern terminus on Spaulding road north of Dow Road in Plainfield Connecticut.

There are multiple connecting main and side trails with parking available at each recreational area.

=== Trail communities ===
The Pachaug Trail passes through land located within the following Connecticut municipalities, from south to north: Griswold, Voluntown and Plainfield

== Landscape, geology, and natural environment ==
The Landscape in the area is generally low-lying and flat with some rolling hills. The most prominent features are the Flat Rock (a closed extension of Flat Rock Road) and the Devil's Den rocks (accessible via an unmarked trail at the eastern end of the Flat Rock section).

Pachaug State Forest features large extents of undeveloped land, consisting of mature growths of hardwood and evergreens, along with swampy areas having extensive coverage by Mountain Laurel and other shrubs and smaller trees.

== History and folklore ==
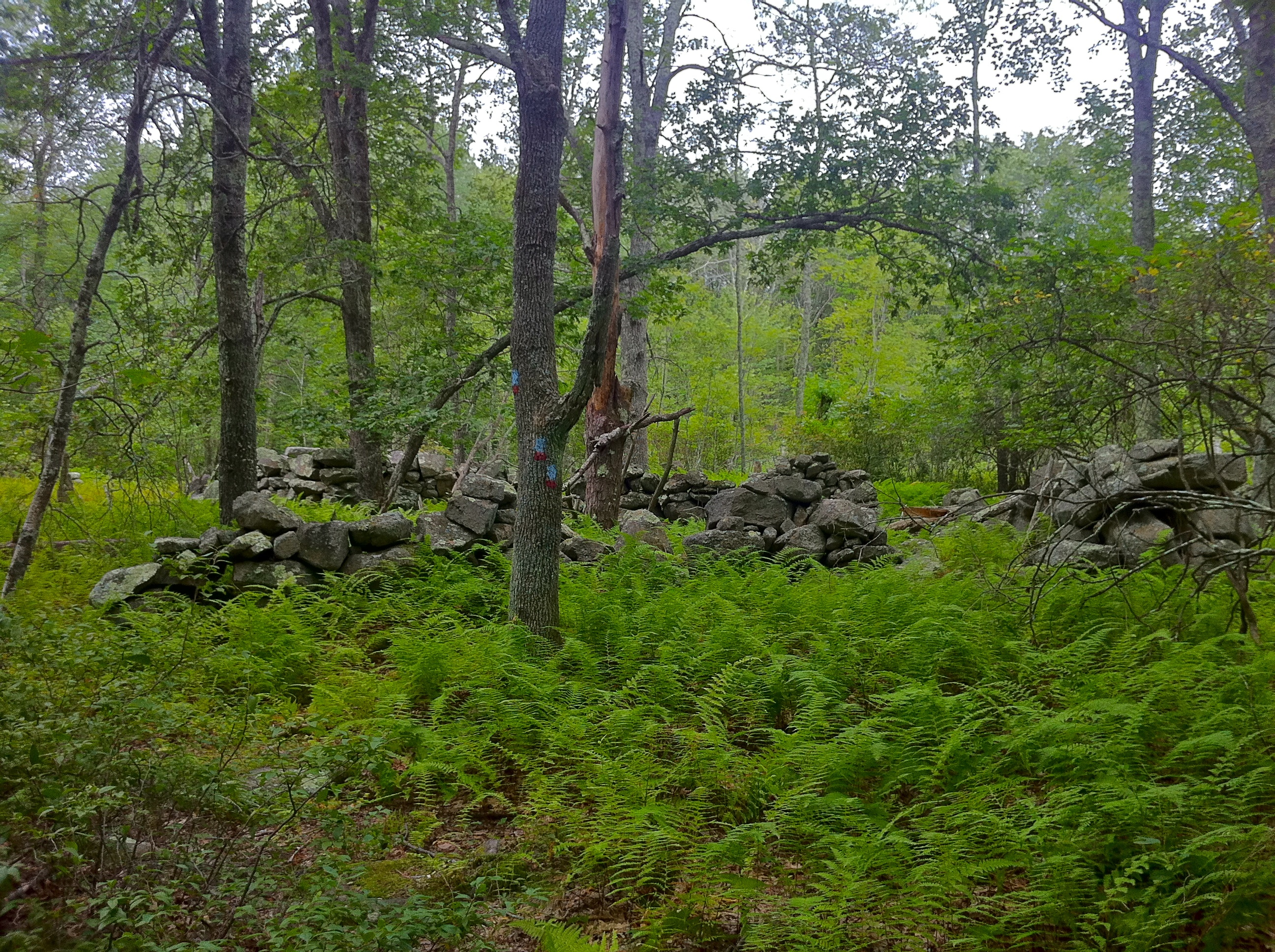
Pachaug-Nehantic Crossover – stone wall ruins, Voluntown, CT

The Blue-Blazed Pachaug Trail was created by the Connecticut Forest and Park Association as part of the Blue-Blazed Hiking Trail system. The Pachaug Trail is named due to its location in the Pachaug State Forest. The Pachaug State Forest is named after the Pachaug River, which runs through the center of the forest.

=== Historic sites ===
The foundations for stone cellars that can be found along the route indicate that much of the landscape was used for settlements and farms up until the late nineteenth and early twentieth century, after which much of the land was allowed to return to forests. In particular stone foundations and extensive stone walls can be found off of the trail in the Hell Hollow Road and Pond area.

Pachaug State Forest was the first state forest in Connecticut and grew quickly in acreage primarily because many of the farmers and landholders in the area realized that their soil was poor for farming and sold their land to the state in the 1920s and 1930s.

=== Folklore ===
The town name of Voluntown is attributed to the fact that it was settled by Volunteers of the Narragansett War in 1700 who received land grants to settle there. The land was remote and difficult to farm and many of the original settlements were subsequently abandoned, so stone walls and foundations can be found throughout the forest today. The inhospitality of the land has been cited as the origin for the name "Hell Hollow" and there are theories regarding the naming of the Devil's Den rock formation near Flat Rock.

There are several unsubstantiated legends and ghost stories which surround the Hell Hollow area including a false claim of witchcraft involving a young girl named Maud Reynolds who died before her second birthday in 1890. Officially she died of diphtheria. She was buried across in the family cemetery on one side of Hell Hollow Road. However, because her gravesite was periodically disturbed it was supposedly moved deep into the woods and because the five-foot concrete cross grave marker was periodically stolen it is now reportedly marked only with stones rather than a grave stone.

== Hiking the trail ==
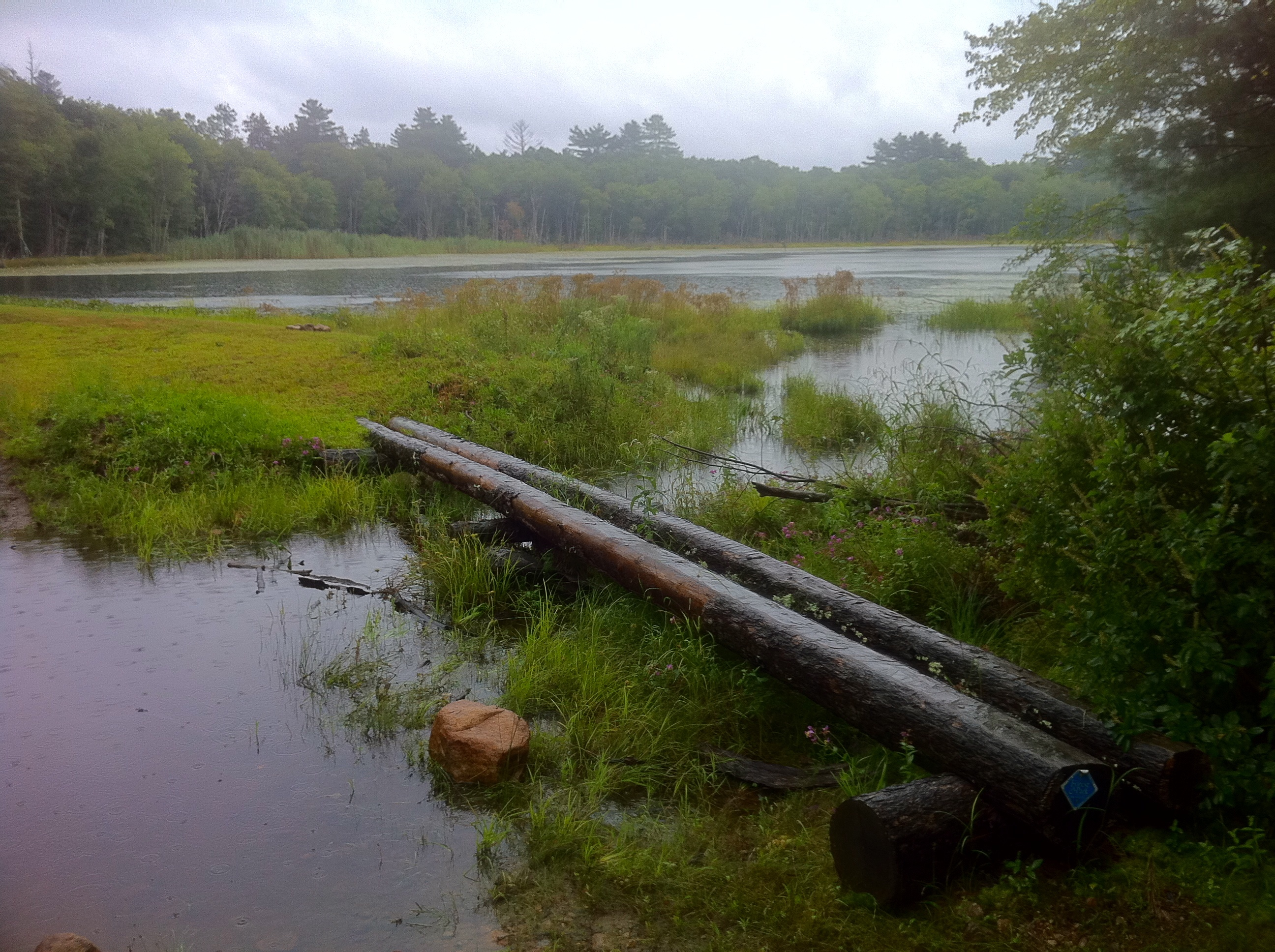
Pachaug Trail – Wiclcabouet Marsh, Voluntown, CT

The mainline trail is blazed with blue rectangles. Trail descriptions are available from a number of commercial and non-commercial sources, and a complete guidebook is published by the Connecticut Forest and Park Association.

Weather along the route is typical of Connecticut. Conditions on exposed ridge tops and summits may be harsher during cold or stormy weather. Lightning is a hazard on exposed summits and ledges during thunderstorms. Snow is also common. Ice can form on exposed ledges and summits, making hiking dangerous without special equipment.

Landscape is low-lying and trails cross wetland areas. Extensive rain and snow melting can lead to wet and muddy conditions.

Biting insects can be bothersome during warm weather. Parasitic deer ticks (which are known to carry Lyme disease) are a potential hazard. Encounter with small wildlife is always possible and hikers should be alert to signs of erratic behavior or other disease symptoms and take evasive action if warranted.

== Conservation and maintenance of the trail corridor ==
Much of the trail is flooded or muddy. There are sections filled with stones and other evidence of erosion which has occurred when the trail has turned into a temporary stream.

There is also evidence of use by all terrain vehicles (ATVs), dirt bikes and horses. Some sections of the Quinebaug trail are explicitly multi-use (paved roads, dirt/gravel forest roads, jeep trails and the Enduro off-road motorcycle trail which winds through Pachaug State Forest), but in other sections there is clearly unauthorized vehicular and equestrian use.

The 58-mile Enduro trail in Pachaug State Forest is marked (on turns and intersections on trees) with white labels containing a red arrow pointing in the trail's direction. The route follows a mix of forest trails and public roads (therefore requiring both a valid current motorcycle registration and motorcycle driver's license rather than ATV registration).

== Image gallery ==
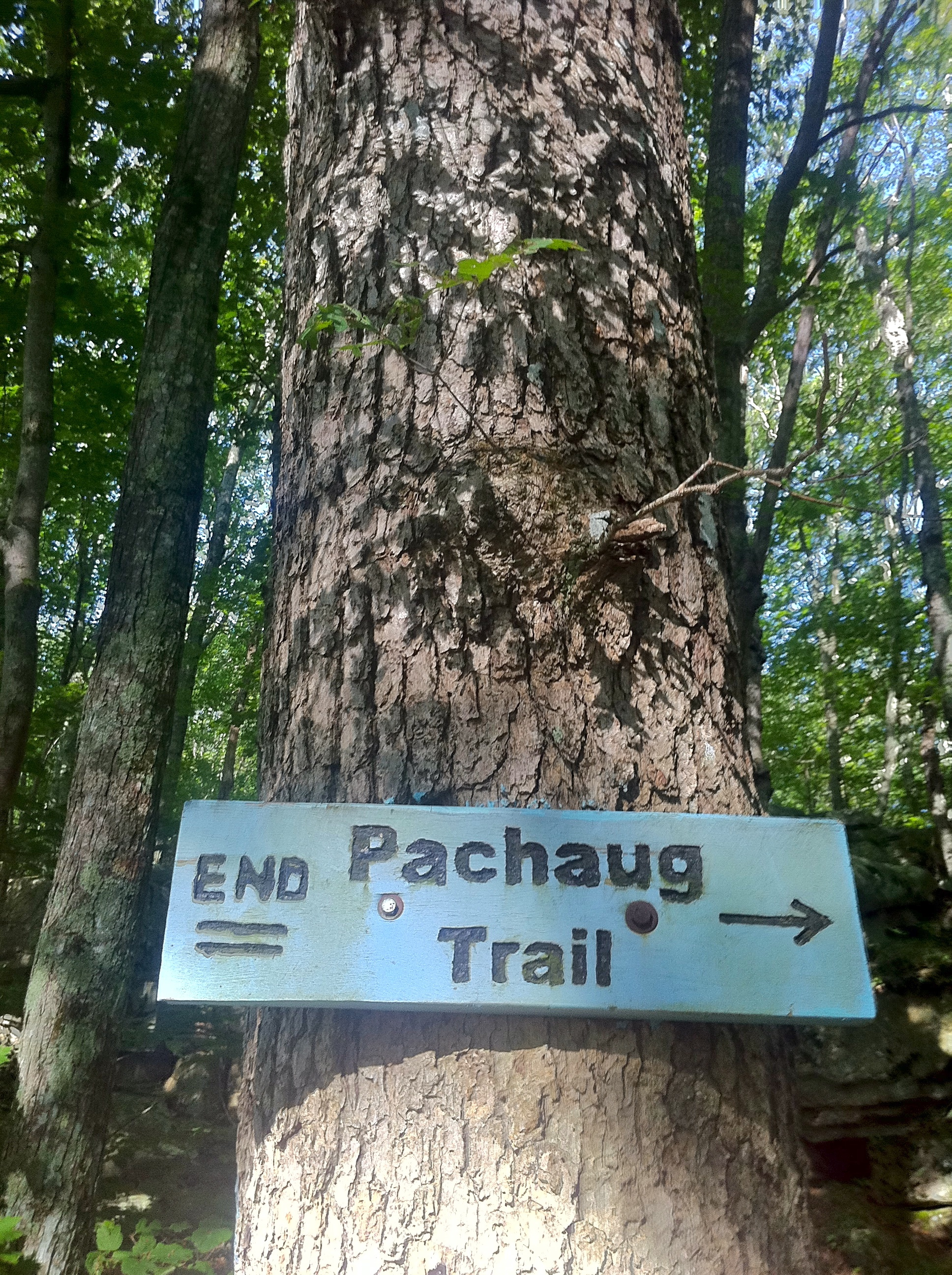
Pachaug Trail – Terminus at Green Fall Pond, Voluntown, CT

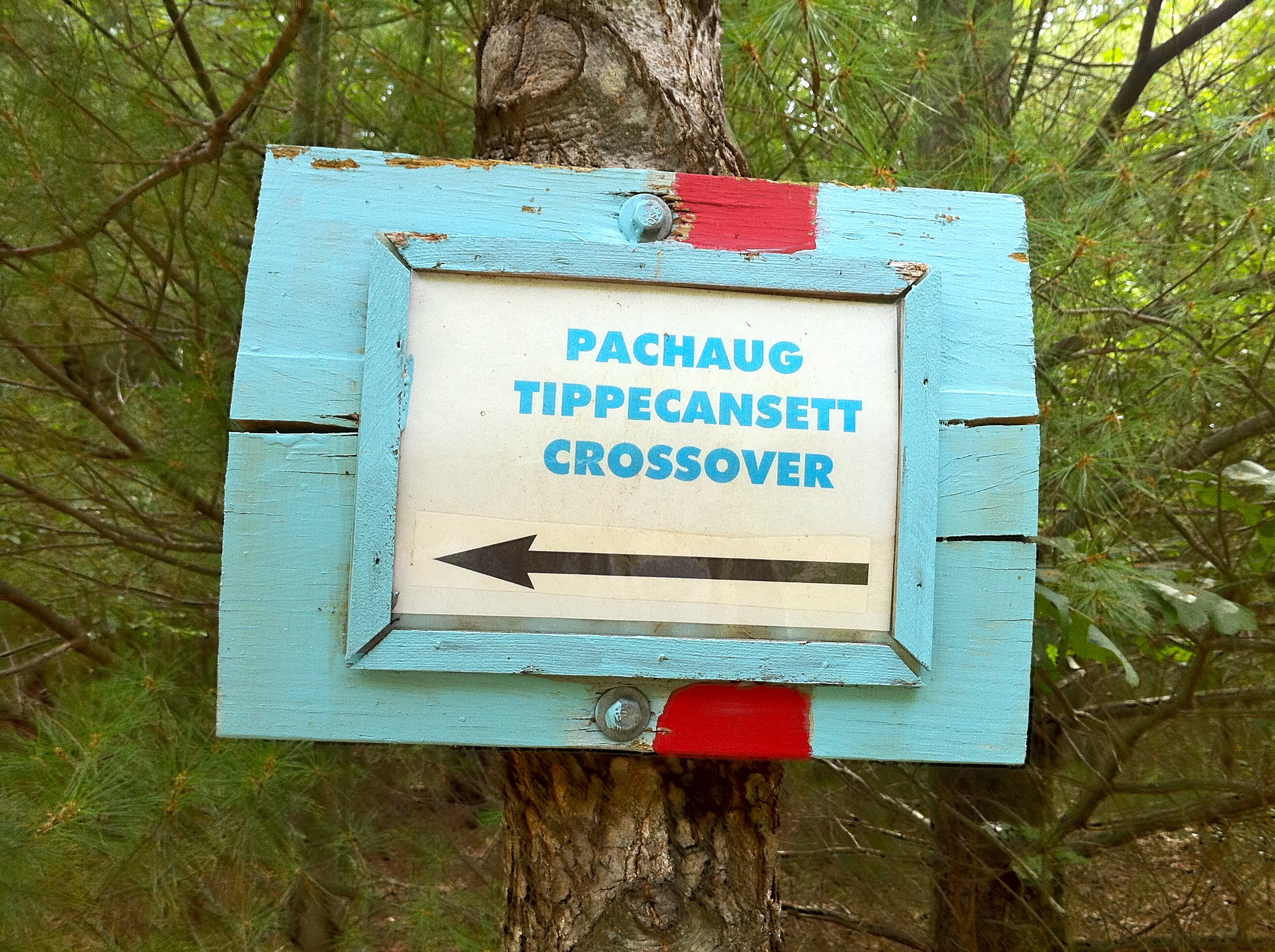
Pachaug-Tippecansett Connector Trail sign south of Noah Ark Road, Voluntown, CT

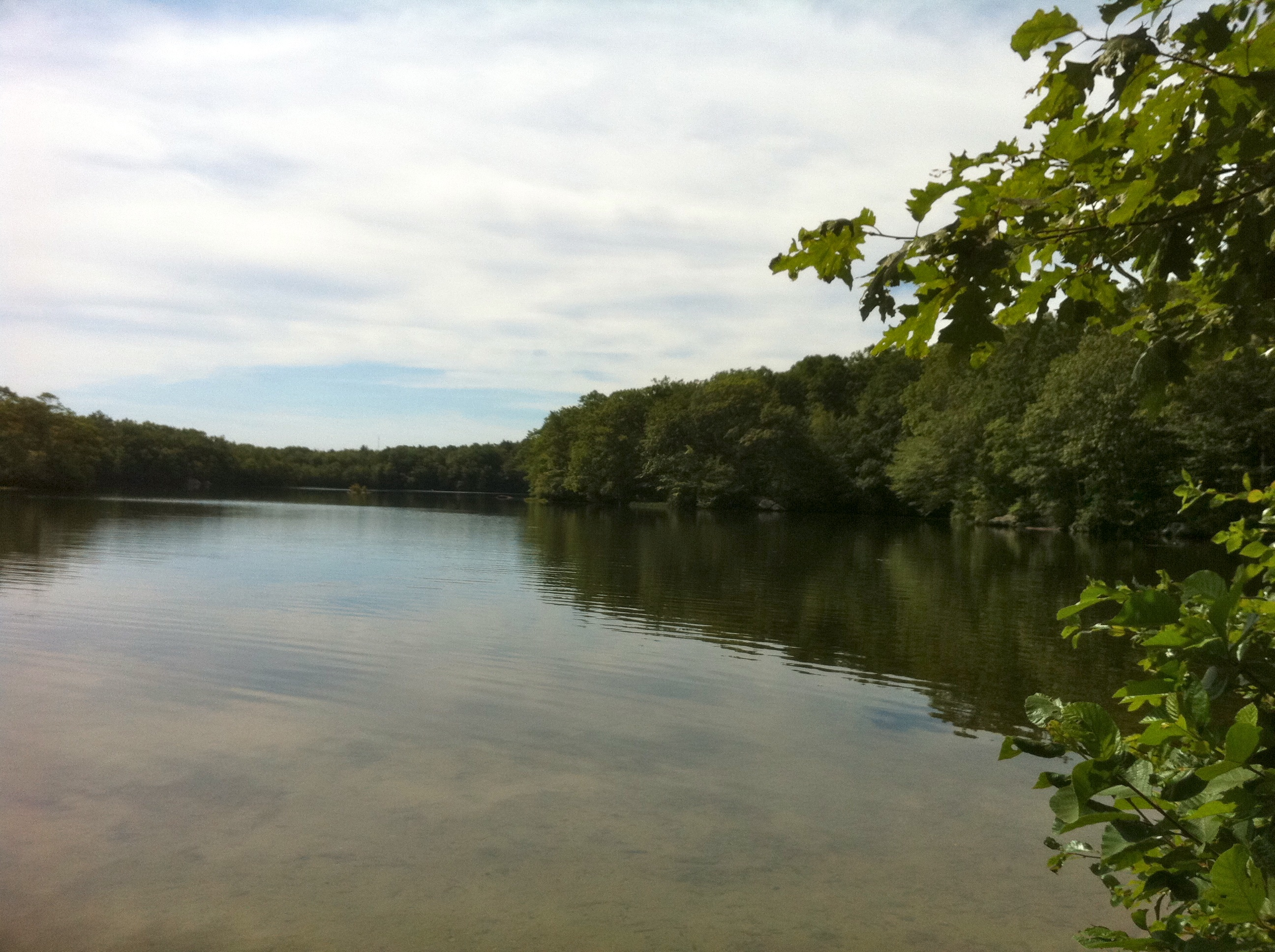
Pachaug Trail – Green Fall Pond northernmost shore looking south, Voluntown, CT

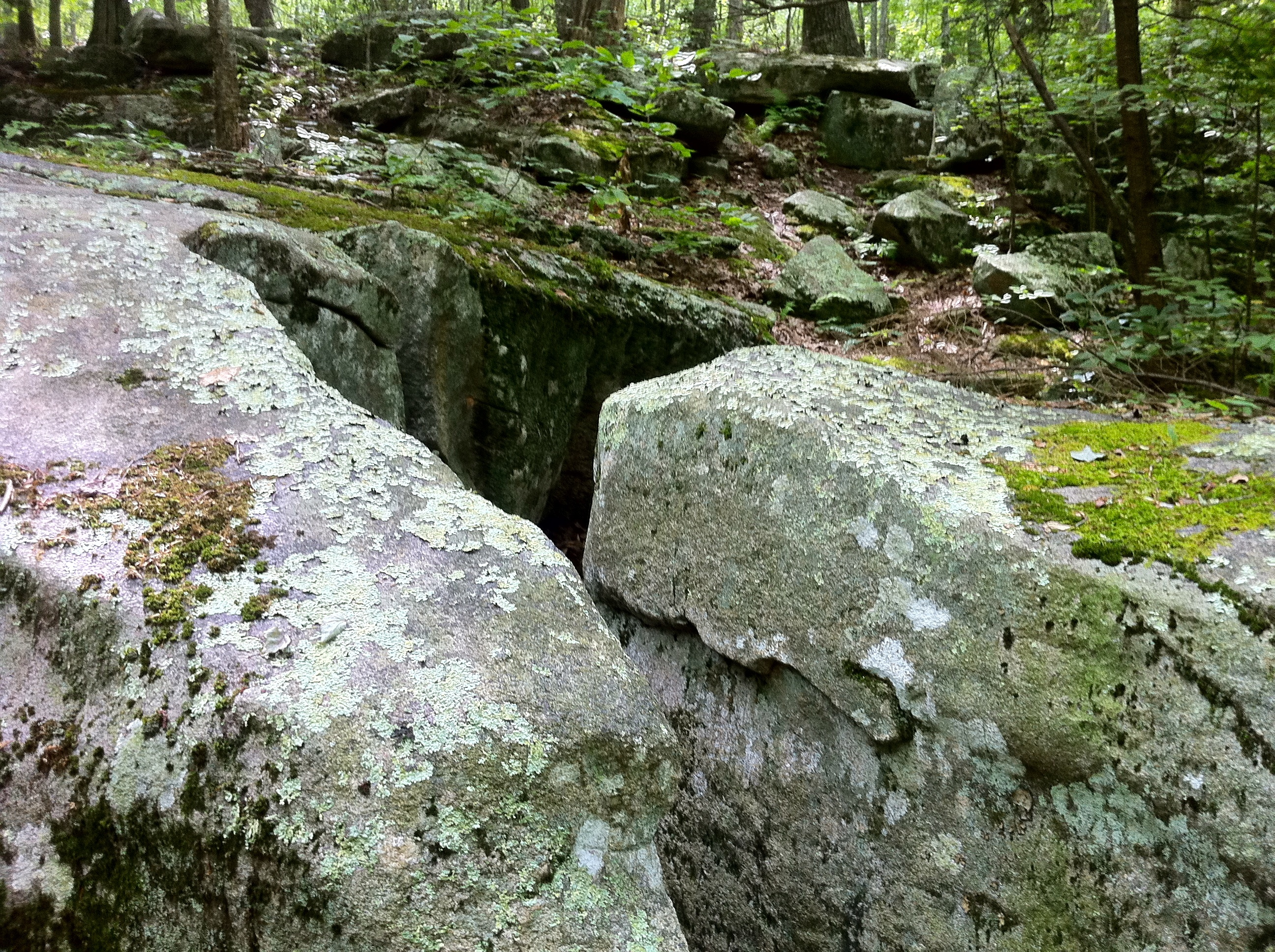
Pachaug Trail – split rock passage near Green Fall Pond trail head, Voluntown, CT

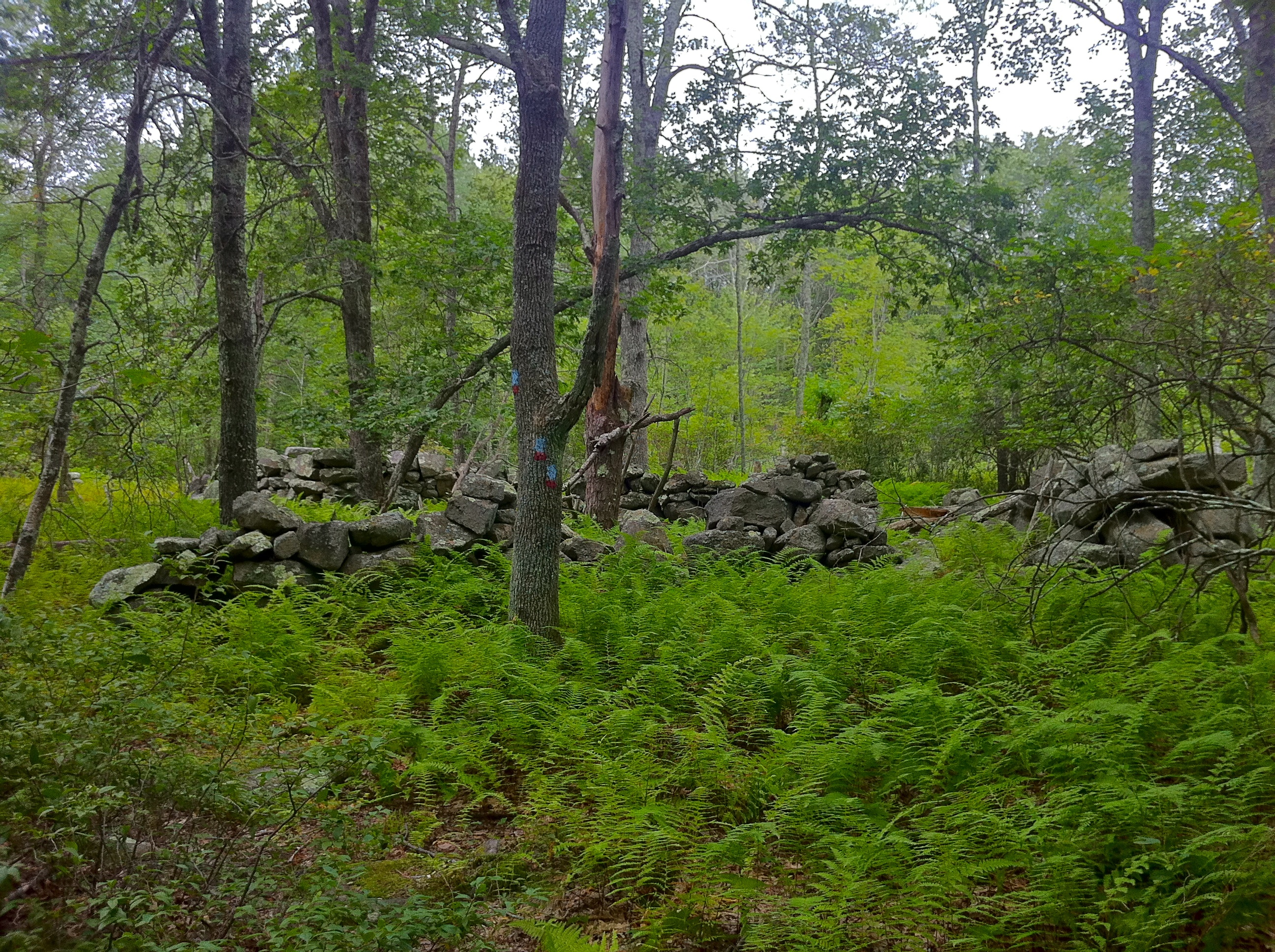
Pachaug-Nehantic Crossover – stone wall ruins, Voluntown, CT

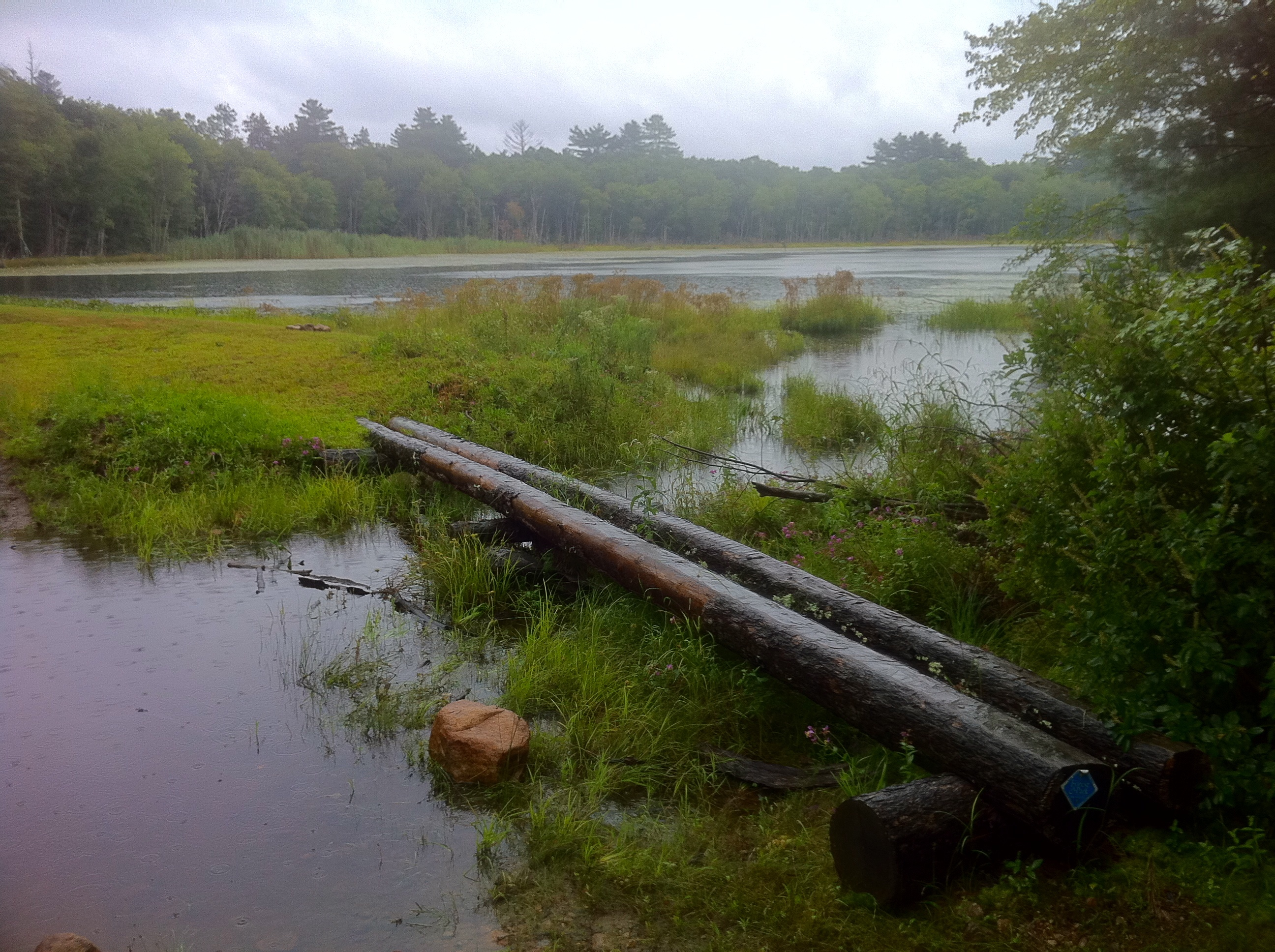
Pachaug Trail – Wiclcabouet Marsh, Voluntown, CT

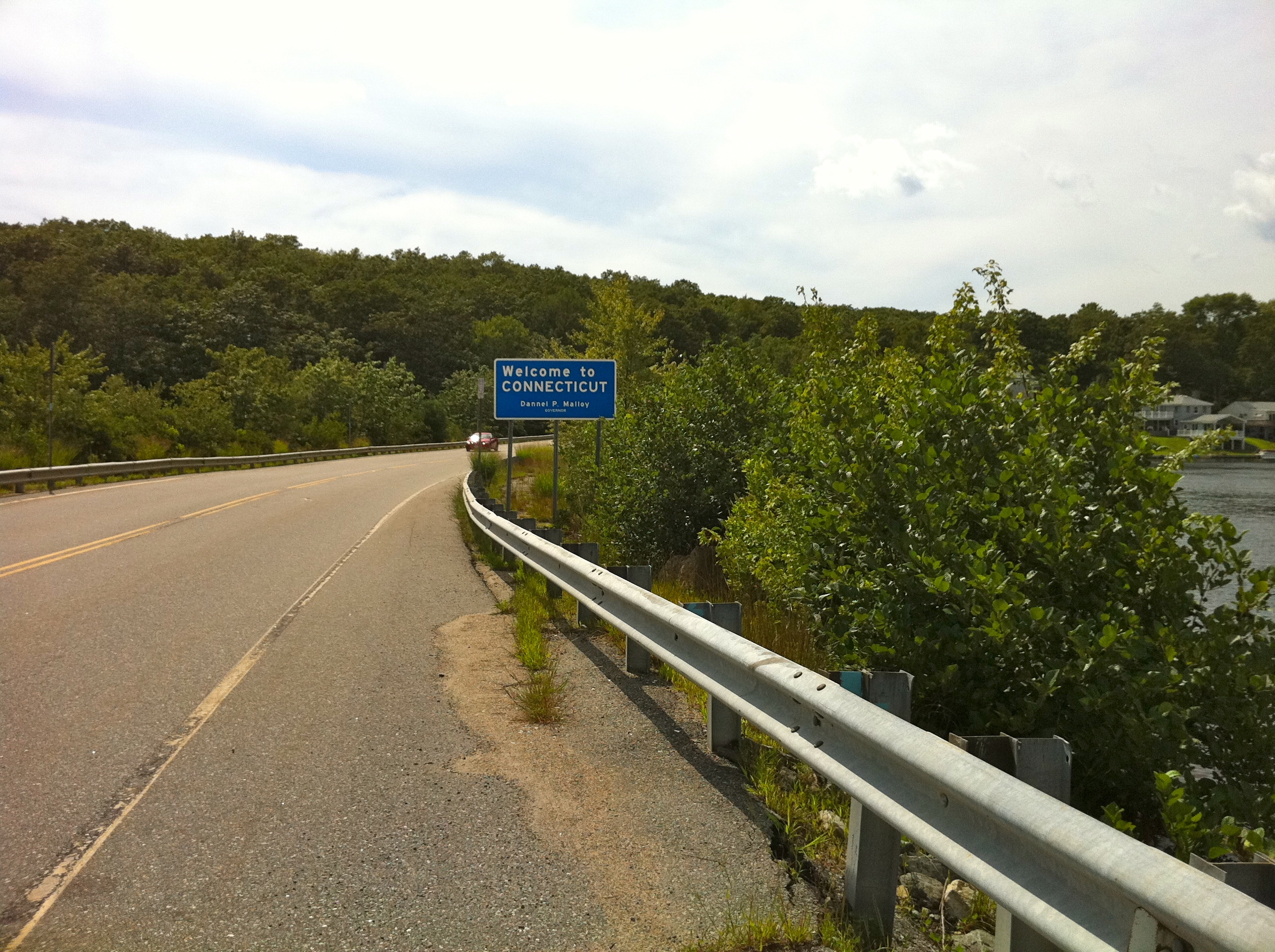
Pachaug Trail – "Welcome to Connecticut sign" at Beach Pond, Hope Valley, RI

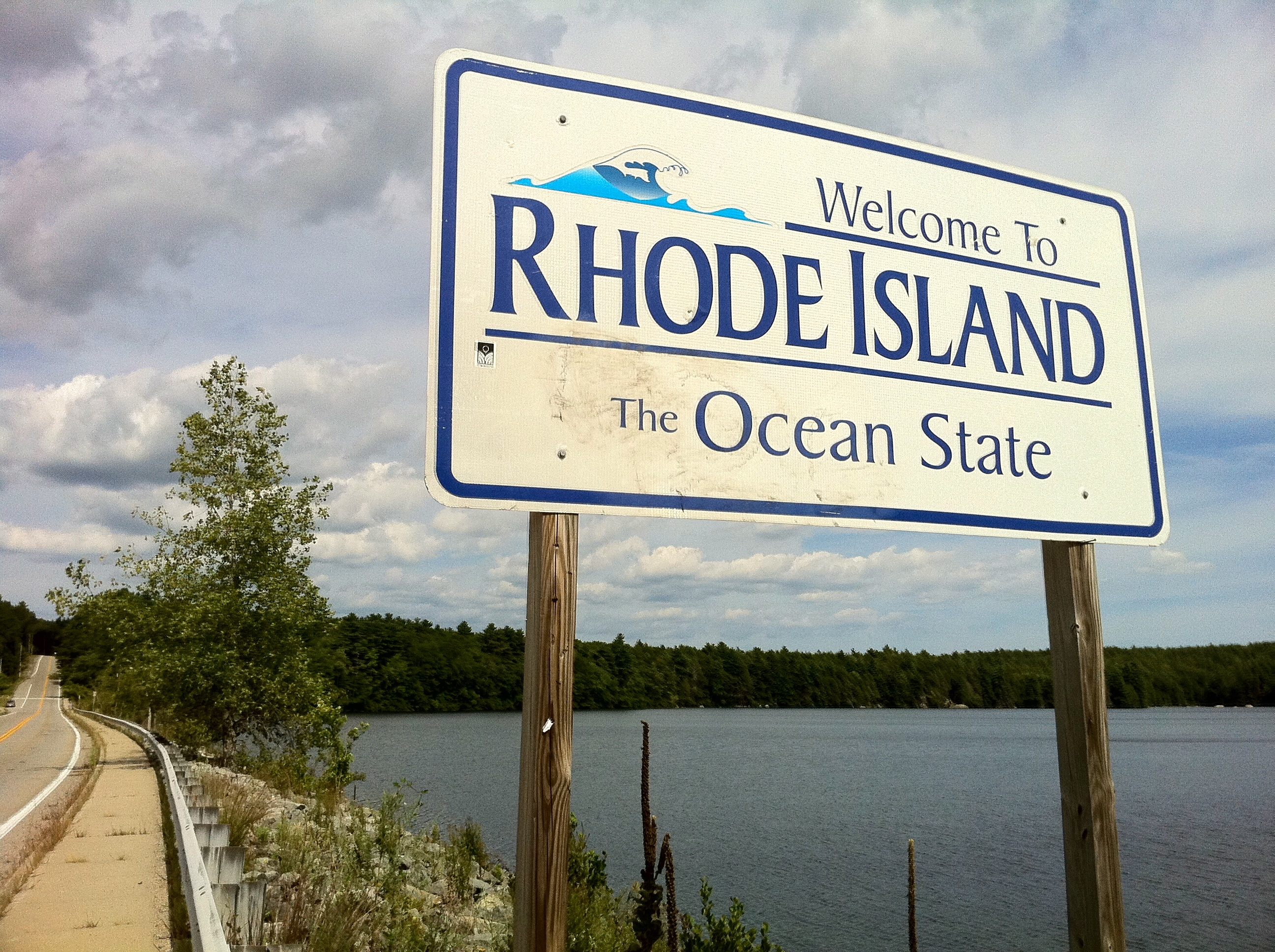
Pachaug Trail – "Welcome to Rhode Island sign" at Beach Pond, Hope Valley, RI

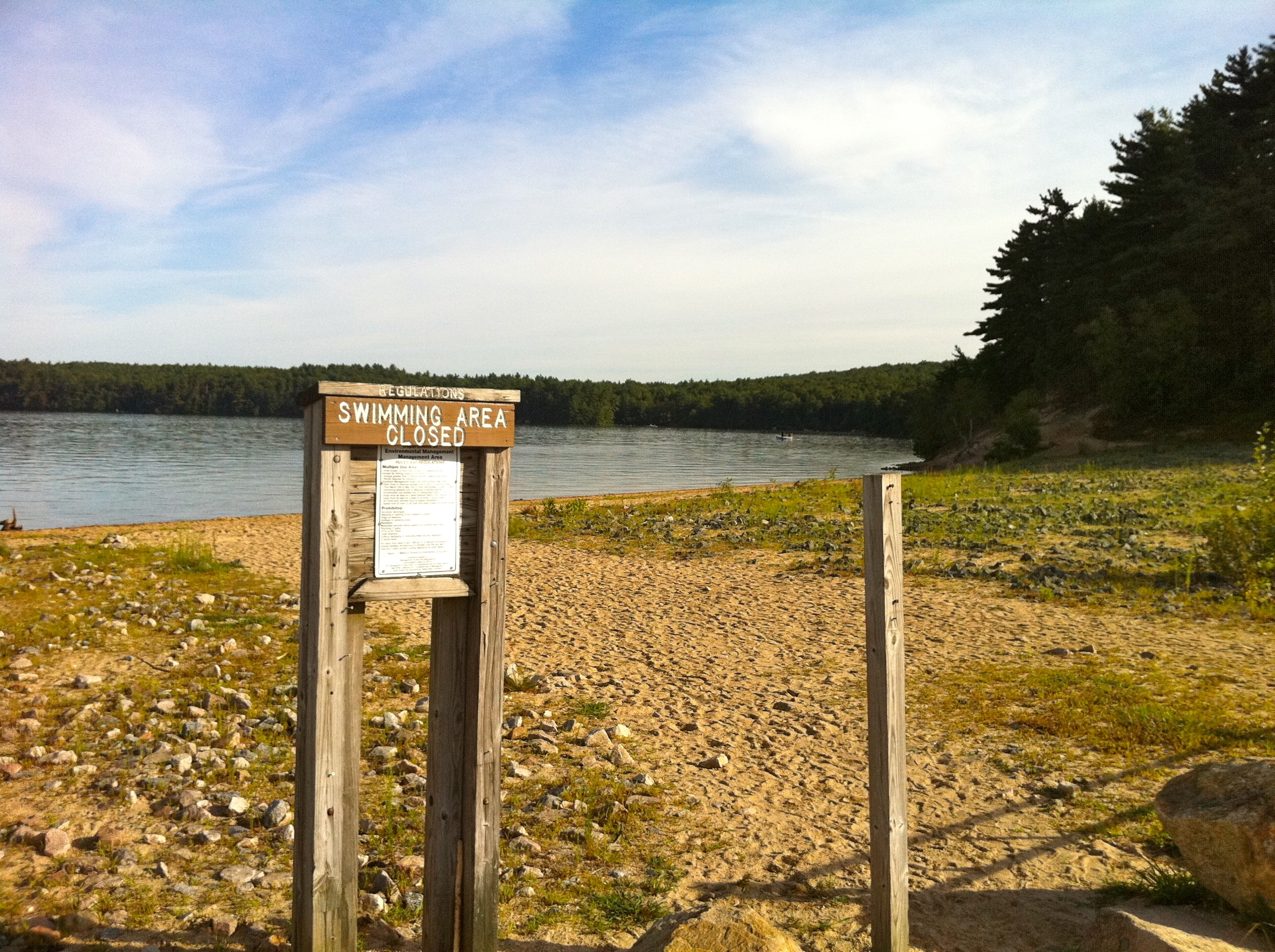
Closed swimming area at Beach Pond, Hope Valley, RI

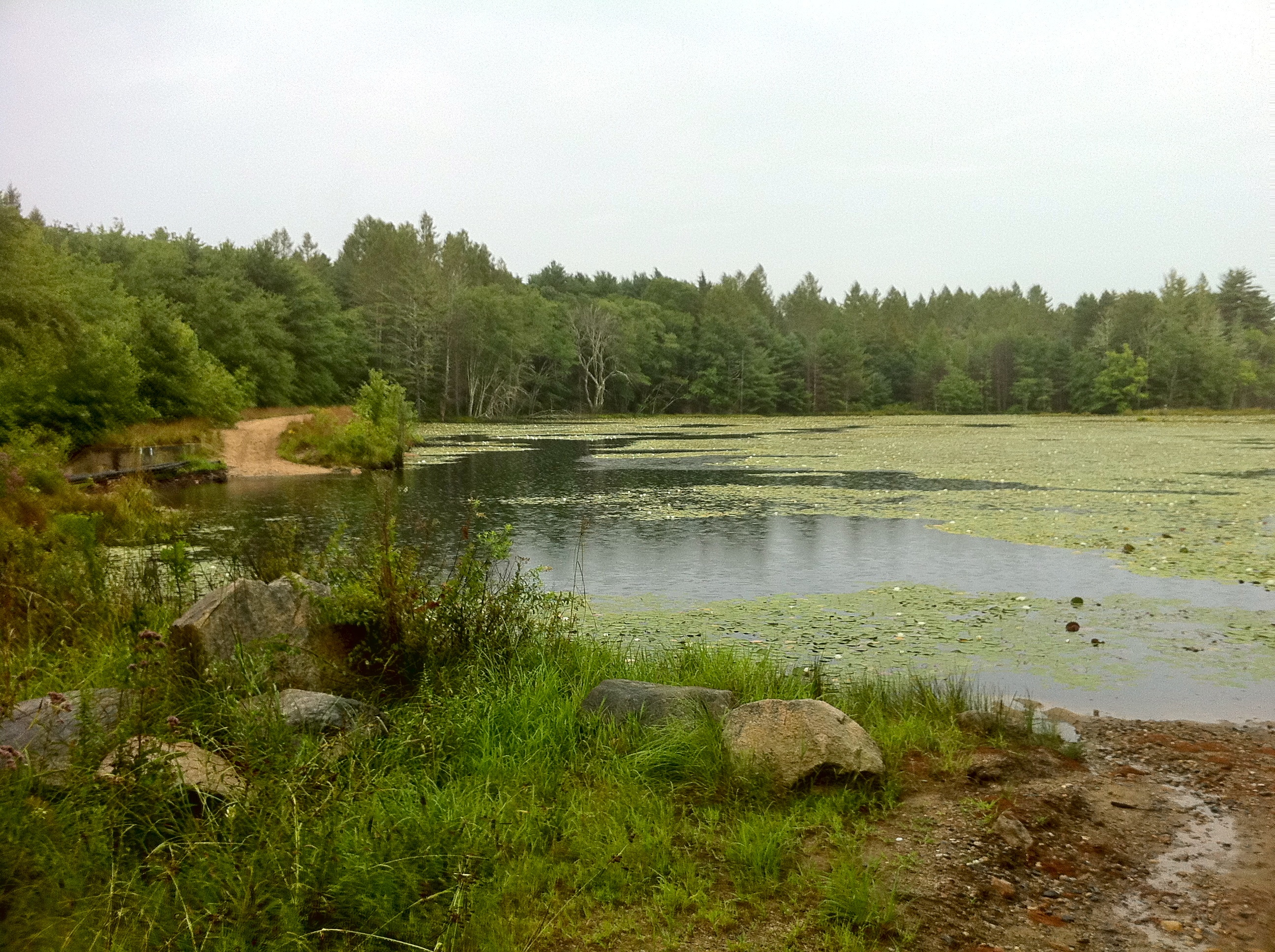
Pachaug Trail – 2 Great Meadow Brook Pond, Voluntown, CT

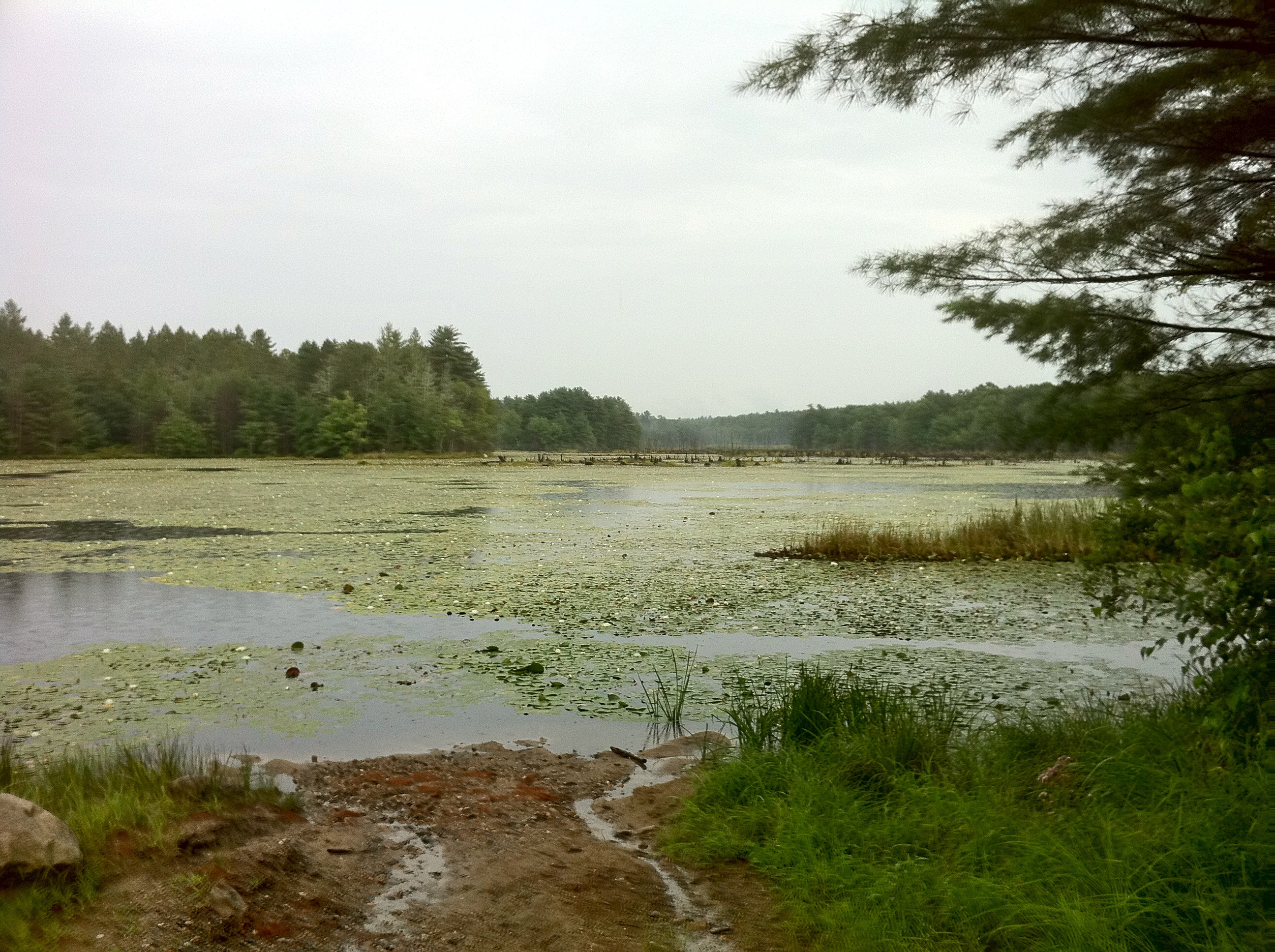
Pachaug Trail – Great Meadow Brook Pond, Voluntown, CT

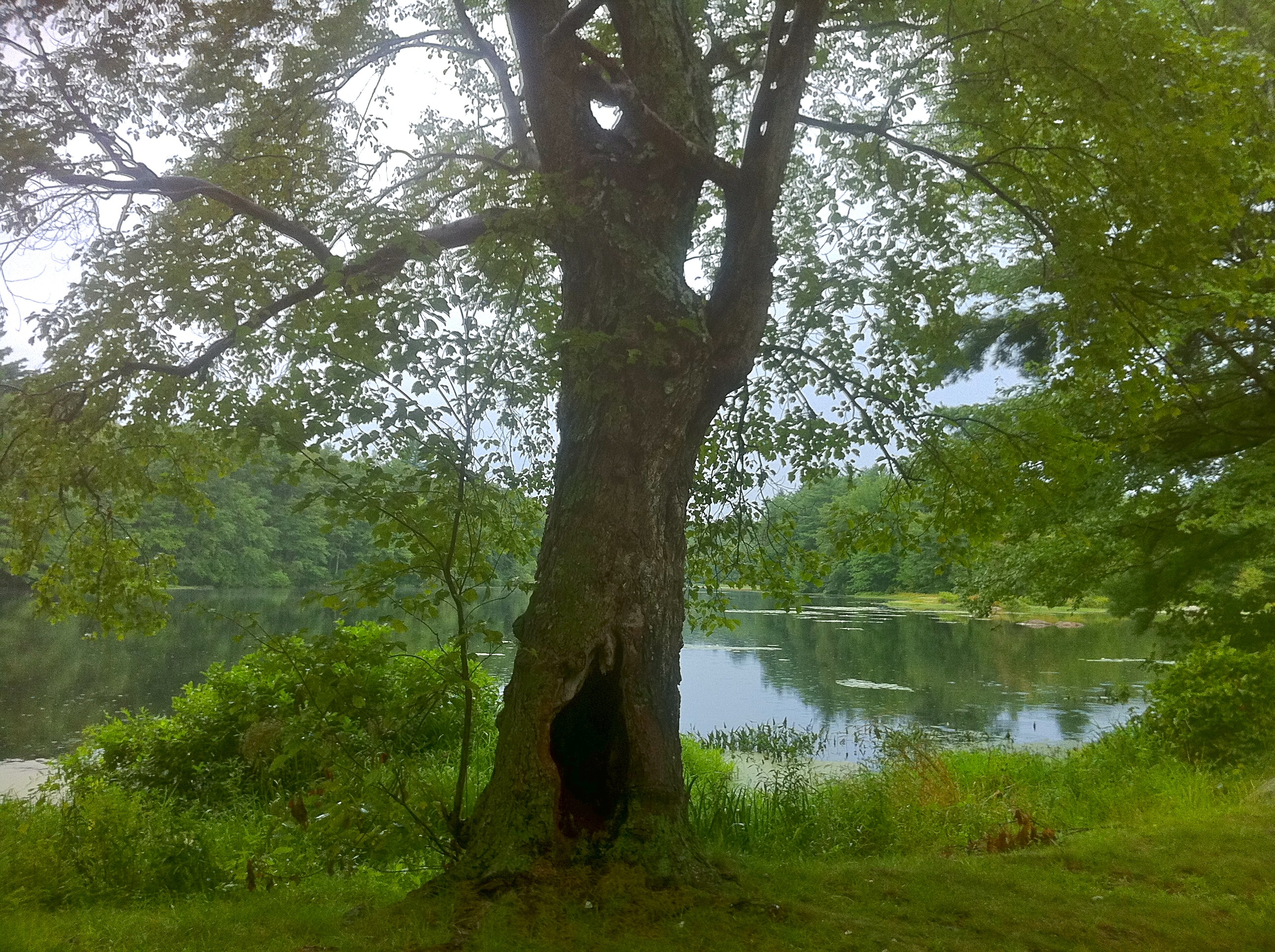
Pachaug Trail – Porter Pond, Sterling, CT

== See also ==
- Blue-Blazed Trails
- Narragansett Trail
- Nehantic Trail
- Quinebaug Trail
- Pachaug State Forest
