= Pachaug State Forest =

Large American forested area

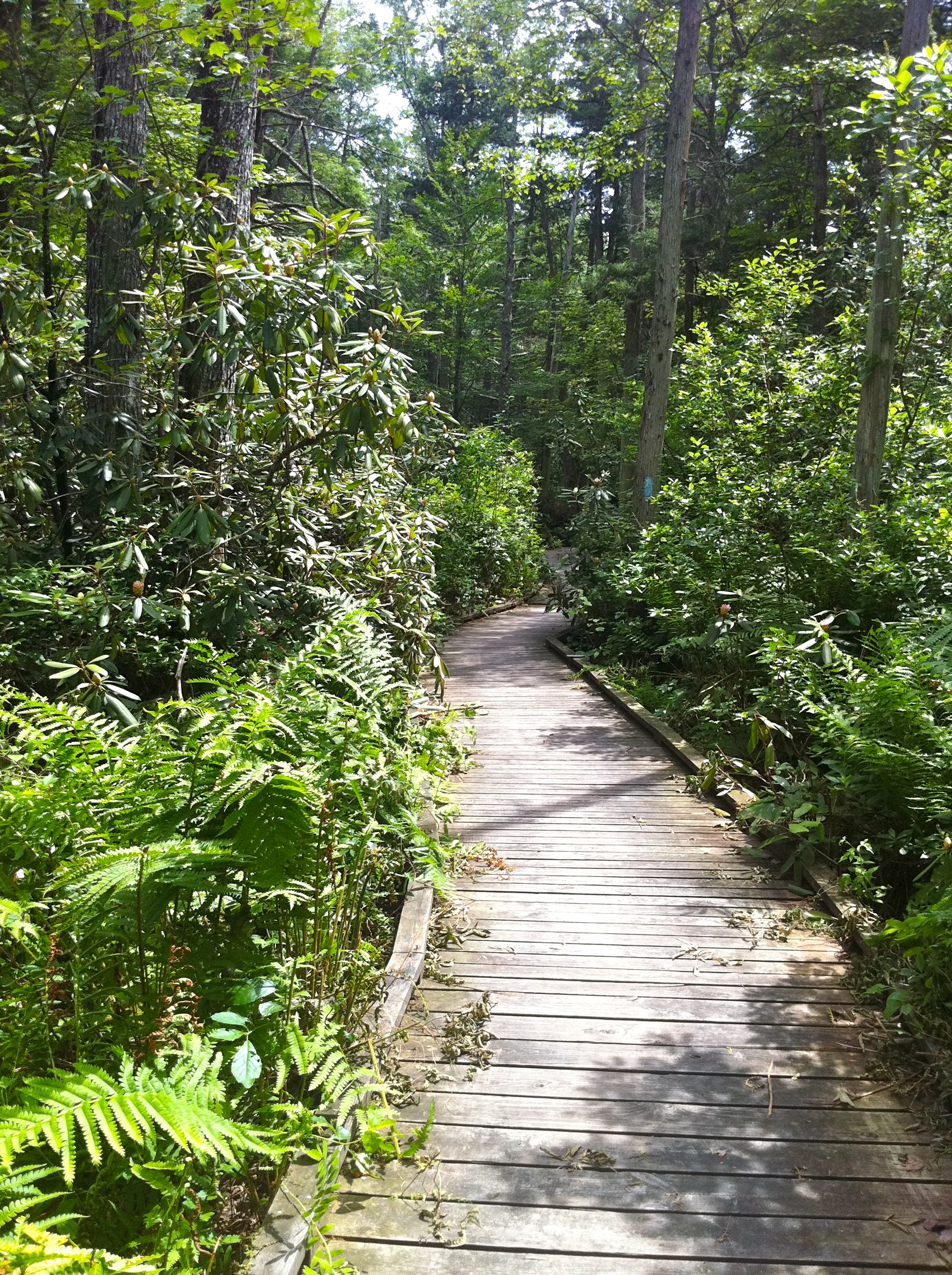
- The Rhododendron Sanctuary Trail

- Location within Connecticut Location within the United States
- Location: Voluntown, Griswold, Plainfield, Sterling, North Stonington, and Preston, Connecticut, United States
- Coordinates: 41°36′05″N 71°53′09″W
- Area: 26,477 acres (10,715 ha)
- Elevation: 459 ft (140 m)
- Established: 1928
- Administrator: Connecticut Department of Energy and Environmental Protection
- Website: Official website

U.S. National Natural Landmark
- Designated: 1973

Pachaug State Forest is the largest forest in the Connecticut state forest system, encompassing over 27,000 acres (110 km^{2}) of land. It is located on the Rhode Island border in New London County, and parcels of the forest lie in the towns of Voluntown, Griswold, Plainfield, Sterling, North Stonington, and Preston. The forest was founded in 1928, but most of the land came from purchases made later during the Great Depression. It is named after the Pachaug River, which runs through the center of the forest. The forest is part of the Northeastern coastal forests ecoregion.

== Features ==
=== Great Meadow ===
The Pachaug-Great Meadow Swamp portion of the park was declared a National Natural Landmark in May 1973 due to its Atlantic white cedar swamp. This type of forest is at risk of being succeeded by hemlock.

=== Hiking trails ===
Four popular hiking trails, maintained by the Connecticut Forest and Park Association, run through Pachaug State Forest:

- The Pachaug Trail runs about 30 miles (48 km) in an east–west route that follows a horse-shoe curve north. It begins at the northern end of Pachaug Pond and ends at Green Fall Pond.
- The Nehantic Trail is a route just under 15 miles (24 km) that begins at Green Fall Pond near the Pachaug Trail trailhead and runs northwest to RT 201 near the Pachaug River.
- The Quinebaug Trail runs north–south for about 7 miles (11 km) from the junction of Breakneck Hill Road and the Nehantic-Quinebaug Trail Crossover to its northern terminus at Spaulding Road.
- The Narragansett Trail runs from the southwest to the northeast, starting from Lantern Hill in North Stonington. The Narragansett Trail leaves the State Forest at the Connecticut/Rhode Island boundary; it enters Yawgoog Scout Reservation in Rhode Island and later ends at Ashville Pond in the village of Canonchet in Hopkinton, Rhode Island.

The handicap (wheelchair) accessible Rhododendron Sanctuary Trail (which includes a planked wooden boardwalk section) in the Pachaug State Forest's Herman Haupt Chapman Management Area is scenic when the Rhododendron are in bloom (June and July).

Several dirt and gravel road trails cross Pachaug State Forest: Trail 1, Trail 2, the Main Drive, and Stonehill Road. In combination with dozens of unmarked side trails, this makes for easy mountain biking terrain that has become popular among locals.

Some trails and roads are marked as multi-use. One such is the Enduro off-road motorcycle trail which winds through Pachaug State Forest. On non–multi-use hiking trails in the forest, however, there is clearly both unauthorized vehicular and unauthorized equestrian use.

=== Motorcycling ===
The 58-mile Enduro trail in Pachaug State Forest is marked (on turns and intersections on trees) with white labels containing a red arrow pointing in the trail's direction. The route follows a mix of forest trails and public roads (therefore requiring both a valid current motorcycle registration and motorcycle driver's license rather than ATV registration).

== Archaeological hoax ==
In 1997 a hunter reported a rocky outcrop to the state archaeologist Nicholas Bellantoni believing it might be an old Indian site. With a team of volunteers he discovered only some not unusual Indian artifacts, such as spear points and pottery shards. Later volunteers digging near the site found material at least a thousand years old. Bellantoni returned to the area in 2000 and this time found about a dozen soil filled pits some distance from the original site they had excavated.

This time he and his team found twenty unique artifacts, stone pendants and pipes in the shape of birds, snakes, whales, and people. Instead of being stuffed with the soil they were buried in, they were filled with ancient charcoal, which is easily available today from other sites. Examination of the soil suggested that the artifacts had been buried recently, The soil where they were buried was soft and loose while surrounding soil was hard and compact. Additionally, the soil in the area is very rooty and the roots need to be cut through to dig a pit. In these cases there was very little sign of regrowth and there was even evidence relatively fresh cut roots. The artifacts had been planted within the last two years or so. All the blowholes in the pipes were exactly three-sixteenths of an inch in diameter. Tests showed that the corrosion of copper beads was artificial. Investigating this hoax cost about $60,000 and hundreds of man-hours. Kevin McBride, a professor of anthropology at the University of Connecticut said "What upsets me is this does a great disservice to native people who have enough trouble as it is to get archaeologists, legislators, and the general public to recognize legitimate concerns about certain places on the landscape. What happens next time, when someone presents evidence of a true sacred site?"
