= Tall Oak Weeden =

American activist (1936–2022)

Everett Gardiner Weeden Jr.
- Born: September 4, 1936; Providence, Rhode Island, U.S.
- Died: February 11, 2022 (aged 85); Charlestown, Rhode Island, U.S.
- Other name: Tall Oak
- Citizenship: U.S.
- Occupations: activist, artist, historian
- Children: Several including David Weeden

Everett Gardiner Weeden Jr., or Tall Oak (September 4, 1936 – February 11, 2022), was an American artist, activist, survivalist, and historian of Indigenous peoples of the Northeastern Woodlands. The Mashpee Wampanoag Tribe stated that Weeden was "a documented descendant of the Mashantucket Pequot, Narragansett, and Wampanoag tribes".

Tall Oak dedicated his life to the education and advocacy of Indigenous rights, and was a founding member of the National Day of Mourning in Plymouth, Massachusetts.

Weeden's traditional name, Tall Oak, was given to him by Princess Red Wing, another prominent historian of Narragansett and Wampanoag descent, when he was 16 years old. Tall Oak traced his surname to his ancestor Toby Weeden, a servant mentioned in the will of John Weeden, of Jamestown, Rhode Island, in 1735.

== Early life and education ==
Weeden was born in Providence, Rhode Island, on September 4, 1936, to Everett Weeden Sr. and Bertha Ramos Weeden. He grew up in North Providence, Rhode Island. In 1945, when he was about eight or nine years old, he moved to the Roger Williams Homes, a public housing project in South Providence.

Weeden attended St. Michael's School. After graduating from Central High School, he was awarded a scholarship to Rhode Island School of Design where he attended 1955 and 1956. From 1957 to 1963, he served in the U.S. Army Reserves.

In 1959, he moved to Washington County to help his cousin, Princess Red Wing, at the nascent Tomaquag Indian Museum. He lived in Charlestown, Rhode Island until his death in 2022.

== National Day of Mourning, 1970 ==
In 1970, on the 350th anniversary of the Pilgrim landing at Plymouth Rock, Frank "Warmsutta" James, of the Aquinnah Wampanoag was asked by Governor Francis Sargent to write and give a speech at the ceremony. However, once James shared his speech with officials, they deemed it was "too aggressive and too extreme." This censorship angered local Indigenous people and helped to spark the creation of the National Day of Mourning.

Inspired to act by the decision of the government officials, Tall Oak gathered several other Indigenous activists from the region including Frank James. The six originally planned their gathering to take place in Jamestown, Virginia, but later decided to hold it in Plymouth, Massachusetts, where the Mayflower landed and a statue of Ousamequin stands, overlooking Plymouth Harbor. Their biggest objective was to make sure the event remained peaceful, part of their mission was to enhance the relationships between Indigenous and non-Indigenous people on Cape Cod.

The first National Day of Mourning was held on Thanksgiving 1970. Almost five hundred Native Americans from across the country gathered in support to hear James give a speech.

== St. David's Island, Bermuda ==
In the 1980s, Tall Oak began work to reconnect members of the Pequot diaspora, dispersed throughout the Atlantic Ocean following the slave trade that followed the Pequot War in first half of the 17th century. On St. David's Island in Bermuda, he helped to form the St. David's Island Indian Reconnection Committee, which acted as a lead proponent for learning more, and then orchestrating a more formal connection between the communities in Connecticut and Bermuda. This culminated in 2002 with the inaugural reconnection. Tall Oak was featured on the cover of St. Clair "Brinky" Tucker's St. David's Island, Bermuda: Its People, History and Culture (2009).

== Personal ==
Everett Weeden married Patricia Turner Weeden (Mashpee Wampanoag). They had several children, including David Weeden (Mashpee Wampanoag), who serves as the tribal historic preservation officer for the Mashpee Wampanoag Tribe. Everett Weeden's grandson is Brian Weeden, the chairman of the Mashpee Wampanoag Tribe.

== See also ==
- Princess Red Wing
- Ella Sekatau
- Loren Spears
