= Philip H. Peckham =

Narragansett chief sachem (1887–1955)

- Night Hawk
- Peckham, 1930s

Chief Sachem of the Narragansett
- In office 1935–1955
- Preceded by: Daniel Sekater and John Noka
- Succeeded by: Cassius A. Champlin (Stone Hatchet)

Personal details
- Born: Philip Henry Peckham; July 14, 1887 Providence, Rhode Island, U.S.
- Died: June 7, 1955 (aged 67) Charlestown, Rhode Island, U.S.
- Resting place: White Brook Cemetery, Carolina, Rhode Island
- Spouses: Clara Frances Perry (died 1940); Henrietta F. (Johnson) Pennywell (m. 1946)
- Children: 3, including Harry Philip Peckham

Philip Henry Peckham (July 14, 1887 – June 7, 1955), known as Chief Sachem Night Hawk, was a Narragansett leader who served as chief sachem of the Narragansett people from 1935 until his death. He helped reorganize the tribe under a Rhode Island state charter in 1934 and held leadership positions in regional intertribal organizations.

== Early life ==
Peckham was born in Providence on July 14, 1887, (Note: His obituaries in The Providence Journal and The New York Times give his birthplace as Providence, as does his own 1942 draft registration card. Other records differ. The 1905 Rhode Island state census records his birthplace as "Johnson, Rhode Island". On his 1917 draft registration card, which he signed, he gave Smithfield. A delayed certificate of birth he obtained in September 1944, sworn on the personal knowledge of his aunt Hannah M. Hazard, gives Charlestown. The 1900 federal census gives his birth as June 1888 in Rhode Island, and the 1905 state census gives July 13, 1887; all other sources give July 14, 1887.) the son of Albert and Catherine (Stanton) Peckham, and apart from his birth he was a lifelong resident of Charlestown. His father was born in Connecticut and his mother in Charlestown, and both were recorded as Narragansett. (Note: The 1944 delayed birth certificate gives his parents' names as Albert Avery Peckham and Kate Stanton; the Providence Journal obituary gives them as "Albert F. and Catherine (Stanton) Peckham".)

Peckham grew up on the family farm in Charlestown. He attended the Ninigret Schoolhouse on the Narragansett reservation in Charlestown, and completed the eighth grade.

== Family and employment ==
He married Clara Frances Perry (1889–1940), who was known in the tribe as Princess Nakomis and later served as Squaw Sachem (saunkskwa).

The couple had three children, each also known by a Native name. Their son, Harry Philip Peckham (Ousa Mequin, "Yellow Feather"), attended Eastern Nazarene College and enlisted in the United States Army in 1942. A staff sergeant, he was the first Narragansett killed in action in World War II. Their elder daughter, Mary (Princess Sweet Grass), was the tribe's musical director and assistant secretary in its first years. In 1941 she married Theodore W. Coggswell (Pahei), a Schaghticoke chief from New Milford, Connecticut. She later served on the Narragansett Indian Council and died in Charlestown in 1983. Their younger daughter, Clara (Princess Kathitha), carried the tribal banner in the 1936 tercentenary parade in Providence. She married Cecil C. Addison (Red Deer) and lived in the New Haven area until her death in 1985.

In December 1946 Peckham married Henrietta F. (Johnson) Pennywell of New Milford, Connecticut, known as Princess Wild Rose, who was serving as squaw sachem of the Narragansett at the time of his death. Through this marriage he had a stepdaughter, Olivia Pennywell of Charlestown, and a stepson, Stuart Pennywell of Peace Dale, her children by Samuel D. Pennywell. (Note: Henrietta and her children appear as "Pennywell" in the 1940 census and in Stuart Pennywell's Social Security record; the Providence Journal obituary spells the name "Pennwell".)

His daughter Mary later recalled that the family grew vegetables and kept cows, horses, hens and pigs at their house in the woods near Gould's Neck, on Pasquiset Pond in Charlestown. When he registered for the World War I draft in 1917, at the age of 29, he was living in Charlestown near the village of Kenyon and described himself as a self-employed farmer supporting a wife and three children. At the 1920 census he was working as a railroad laborer, and in 1935 he was listed as a laborer for the state roads. When he registered for the World War II draft in 1942, at the age of 54, his employer was Harriett Crooker of Gatewood Farm in Wakefield. He continued to work for Gatewood Farm, later as a butcher at the Gatewood Farm Market in South Kingstown, until shortly before his death.

== Reorganization of the tribe (1934) ==
In 1880 the Rhode Island General Assembly passed an act "detribalizing" the Narragansett, and the tribal council deeded the remaining common lands to the state for $5,000 (equivalent to $166,810 in 2025). Over the next four years the state's Commission on the Affairs of the Narragansett Indians compiled a roll of tribal members and distributed the payment, and for more than fifty years afterward the tribe had no state-chartered organization. Tribal members nonetheless continued to hold monthly meetings and the annual August meeting.

By the late 1920s the tribe's leaders were the Rev. Daniel Sekater of Westerly and John Noka of Shannock, who were acting as co-chiefs and pursuing claims that the state had illegally taken the tribe's lands in 1880. In 1931 Sekater announced plans to sue the state for $4,000,000 (equivalent to $84,682,713 in 2025), which he gave as the value of the land taken. According to the Bureau of Indian Affairs, a younger group, drawn from different families and active in pan-Indian organizations, gained influence from 1925 onward. It worked with state officials toward recognition of the tribe and revived Narragansett ceremonies. Peckham was among this group, which by 1934 had displaced the co-chiefs and led the reorganization of the tribe.

On August 12, 1934, at the tribe's annual meeting, after criticism of how the money and business of the Narragansett Indian Church in Charlestown had been handled, the members named Peckham "Commissioner of Indian Affairs of the Charlestown reservation and Indian Church" and, by a unanimous voice vote, gave him and the church's pastor, the Rev. Christian S. Mars, full authority over the church's affairs. On December 3, 1934, Rhode Island Secretary of State Louis W. Cappelli granted a charter of incorporation to the "Narragansett Tribe of Indians", and Peckham was one of its eight incorporators. (Note: The incorporators were William L. Wilcox, Philip H. Peckham, Charles H. Babcock, R. Lewis Wilcox, Harry A. Peckham, Marion W. Brown, Clara F. Peckham and Rachel A. Peckham.)

The next evening, about 200 Narragansett people and a similar number of guests gathered at Memorial Hall in Shannock, a village on the Charlestown–Richmond line. Rhode Island Governor Theodore F. Green addressed the meeting, and Gladys Tantaquidgeon, a Mohegan then representing the Bureau of Indian Affairs, attended as an observer. Peckham told the meeting he had been working on the Narragansett movement for many years and was pleased that the Narragansetts had at last seen the need to organize. To promote the tribe's education and advancement, he said, "we must prepare ourselves to advance with civilization but still keep the old Narragansett traditions."

== Chief sachem (1935–1955) ==
The first regular meeting under the new charter was held early in 1935 at Memorial Hall in Shannock, with about 66 members present. Peckham was elected chief sachem for a two-year term, alongside a nine-member council that included his eventual successor, Cassius Champlin. With the incorporation, the tribe publicly re-established the offices of chief sachem, medicine man, council, scribe and prophet. The first issue of the tribal monthly The Narragansett Dawn (May 1935) carried a dedication signed by "Chief Sachem Night Hawk" to the coming generations of the tribe. The Dawn explained that the night hawk, a bird sacred to the Narragansett that they tamed to chase crows from their cornfields, was the sachem's totem and meant that "our sachem gives a helping hand to all difficulties and troubles". (Note: "Night Hawk" is the form used in the tribe's own publication, The Narragansett Dawn, which explained the night hawk as the sachem's totem. Some newspapers and later accounts wrote it as one word, "Nighthawk".)

Peckham worked for many years toward building a longhouse in Charlestown as a meeting place for the tribe. Built in the early 1940s, largely through the church board and with land and money from tribal members, it became the center of the tribe's activities. Peckham remained chief sachem until his death in 1955.

== Narragansett Indian Church ==
As commissioner, Peckham oversaw the church and the tribe's annual August meeting held there each year on the second Sunday of August. He built an outdoor amphitheatre near the church where the meeting's services were held in good weather, and he directed the 1935 meeting, which drew about 500 people from across New England and as far as Arizona and New Mexico. In the first issue of the Dawn he wrote a short history of the church, crediting the Rev. LeRoy C. Perry (Chief Ousa-Mequin) of the Wampanoag with restoring a religious focus to the August meetings, and his own family with keeping services going and the building in repair. He later served on the church's executive council.

== Intertribal organizations ==
Peckham and his wife Clara were members of the Algonquin Indian Council of New England, a pan-Indian organization founded in the 1920s. At his death he was chief of its successor organization, the National Algonquin Indian Council, and of the Nipmuck Council of Worcester, Massachusetts. He represented the Narragansett as chief sachem at the annual Fourth of July gatherings on the Hassanamisco Nipmuc reservation in Grafton, Massachusetts, including those of 1946 and 1950.

== Death and succession ==
Peckham had a heart attack on June 2, 1955, and died at his home on South County Trail in Charlestown on June 7, aged 67. His funeral at the Indian Church was attended by representatives of eight other tribes, and he was buried in Native regalia at White Brook Cemetery in Carolina. He was survived by his wife Henrietta, his two daughters, and his stepdaughter and stepson.

The Providence Journal reported that his death left the tribe temporarily without a head and that a new chief would probably be elected at a special meeting. By August 1956 the tribe's chief sachem was Cassius A. Champlin of Wakefield, known as Chief Stone Hatchet, who had been president of the tribal council in the 1930s. Champlin died in office in June 1964, and George "Red Fox" Watson, who had served as first councilman and tribal secretary, was elected chief sachem later that year. (Note: The Bureau of Indian Affairs found that a chief, a chairman and a council continued to exist between the 1950s and the mid-1960s, although regular elections do not appear to have been held.)

== Sources ==
- Belz, Anthony (May 20, 2025), "From The Archives: Honoring Harry Philip Peckham (1913–1944)", Belongings Blog, Tomaquag Indian Memorial Museum
- Bureau of Indian Affairs (July 29, 1982), Recommendation and Summary of Evidence for Proposed Finding for Federal Acknowledgment of the Narragansett Indian Tribe of Rhode Island (PDF), United States Department of the Interior
- Champlin, Cassius A., "To Our Youth", Dawnland Voices 2.0, Tomaquag Museum, Princess Red Wing Papers
- Commission on the Affairs of the Narragansett Indians (1884), Fourth Annual Report of the Commission on the Affairs of the Narragansett Indians, Made to the General Assembly at Its January Session, 1884, Providence: State of Rhode Island
- "Narragansetts' Pow-wow Sunday", The Evening Bulletin, Providence, Rhode Island, p. 9, August 10, 1934 – via NewsBank
- "Indian Pow-Wow Attended by 300: Narragansetts Conduct 257th Annual Session—Governor Is Speaker", The Evening Bulletin, Providence, Rhode Island, p. 2, August 13, 1934 – via NewsBank
- "Peckham—Pennywell", The Evening Bulletin, Providence, Rhode Island, p. 4, December 30, 1946 – via NewsBank
- "Powwow to Rhythm of Tom-Toms", The Evening Bulletin, Providence, Rhode Island, p. 4, August 13, 1956 – via NewsBank
- "Theodore W. Coggswell: Indian Tribal Chief Dies in Charlestown", The Evening Bulletin, Providence, Rhode Island, p. 2, July 3, 1964 – via NewsBank
- "Cecil C. Addison", The Evening Bulletin, Providence, Rhode Island, p. 12, March 21, 1979 – via NewsBank
- "Addison, Clara (Peckham)", The Evening Bulletin (Death notice), Providence, Rhode Island, p. 32, April 12, 1985 – via NewsBank
- Princess Red Wing; Hazard, Ernest, eds. (May 1935), The Narragansett Dawn (Vol. 1, no. 1), Oakland, Rhode Island: Narragansett Tribe of Indians – via DigitalCommons@URI, University of Rhode Island Special Collections
- Princess Red Wing, ed. (May 1936), "Totems", The Narragansett Dawn, vol. 2, no. 1, Oakland, Rhode Island: Narragansett Tribe of Indians, p. 12 – via DigitalCommons@URI, University of Rhode Island Special Collections
- Princess Red Wing, ed. (September 1936), The Narragansett Dawn (Vol. 2, no. 5), Oakland, Rhode Island: Narragansett Tribe of Indians – via DigitalCommons@URI, University of Rhode Island Special Collections
- "Perseverance", Narragansett Indian Tribe
- "Indian Sachem Is Dead; Philip Peckham, Night Hawk, Led Narragansett Tribe", The New York Times, p. 29, June 9, 1955
- Office of Federal Acknowledgment (2004), Summary under the Criteria and Evidence for Final Determination against Federal Acknowledgment of the Nipmuc Nation (PDF), United States Department of the Interior
- "Indian Chief to Seek State Probe of Charge Land Wrongfully Taken: Westerly Leader of Narragansetts Will Ask Legislature to Name Commission to Study Claim in Transfer for $5000 of Area Worth $4,000,000", The Providence Journal, Providence, Rhode Island, pp. 1, 12, December 23, 1931 – via NewsBank
- "Indian Meeting Attended by 500: Narragansetts Conduct 258th Session at Reservation in Charlestown", The Providence Journal, Providence, Rhode Island, p. 5, August 12, 1935 – via NewsBank
- "Philip Peckham, Indian Tribesman, 67, Dies: Charlestown Resident Better Known as Chief Sachem Night Hawk", The Providence Journal, Providence, Rhode Island, p. 23, June 8, 1955 – via NewsBank
- "Cassius A. Champlin: Narragansett Chief Sachem Dies in Hospital, Aged 70", The Providence Journal, Providence, Rhode Island, p. 4, June 5, 1964 – via NewsBank
- "Mary A. Coggswell", The Providence Journal, Providence, Rhode Island, p. B-3, April 18, 1983 – via NewsBank
- "Indian's Ancestor Seeks $4,000,000: Rev. Daniel Sekater of Westerly Plans Civil Action Against State of R. I.", The Providence Sunday Journal, Providence, Rhode Island, p. 2, March 22, 1931 – via NewsBank
- "Chief Sachem Night Hawk Buried With Indian Honors", The Providence Sunday Journal, Providence, Rhode Island, p. 48, June 12, 1955 – via NewsBank
- "Narragansett Indians Open Two-Day Tribal Celebration", The Providence Sunday Journal, Providence, Rhode Island, p. I-14, August 12, 1956 – via NewsBank
- "'We went to school together and we never knew any difference between us'", The Providence Sunday Journal, Providence, Rhode Island, p. 239, April 8, 1979 – via NewsBank
- Rhode Island State Department of Health, Division of Vital Statistics (September 22, 1944), Delayed Certificate of Birth: Philip Henry Peckham, Charlestown no. 1042 – via FamilySearch, "Rhode Island, Vital Records, 1846–1898, 1901–1955"
- Rhode Island State Census, 1905, Entry for Phillip H. Peckham, Charlestown, Washington County – via FamilySearch
- Rhode Island State Census, 1935, Census card for Philip H. Peckham, South County Trail, Kenyon, Charlestown, Washington County, census tract 348, January 23, 1936, FamilySearch microfilm 1753715 – via FamilySearch
- Selective Service System (June 5, 1917), World War I Draft Registration Card: Philip H. Peckham, Charlestown, Washington County, Rhode Island, precinct 1, serial no. 34, National Archives and Records Administration, NARA microfilm publication M1509 – via FamilySearch
- Selective Service System (1942), World War II Draft Registration Card: Philip Henry Peckham, Charlestown, Washington County, Rhode Island, serial no. U-429 (fourth registration), National Archives and Records Administration, NARA microfilm publication M1964 – via FamilySearch
- Social Security Administration, Numerical Identification File (NUMIDENT): Stuart Bradly Pennywell – via FamilySearch, "United States, Social Security Numerical Identification Files (NUMIDENT), 1936–2007"
- "George 'Red Fox' Watson, 86, chief sachem of the Narragansett Indian tribe for 22 years, died Monday", UPI Archives, United Press International, February 25, 1986
- Twelfth Census of the United States, 1900, Charlestown, Washington County, Rhode Island, enumeration district 231, sheet 11B, household 248 (entry for Albert Peckham), National Archives and Records Administration, NARA microfilm publication T623 – via FamilySearch
- Fourteenth Census of the United States, 1920, Charlestown, Washington County, Rhode Island, enumeration district 347, sheet 3A, line 38, household 68 (entry for Philip Peckham), National Archives and Records Administration, NARA microfilm publication T625, roll 1681 – via FamilySearch
- Sixteenth Census of the United States, 1940, Charlestown, Washington County, Rhode Island, enumeration district 5-1, sheet 6A, line 32 (entry for Phillip Peckham), National Archives and Records Administration, NARA microfilm publication T627 – via FamilySearch
- Sixteenth Census of the United States, 1940, New Milford, Litchfield County, Connecticut, enumeration district 3-21, sheet 7A, line 20 (entry for Henretta Pennywell), National Archives and Records Administration, NARA microfilm publication T627 – via FamilySearch
- "Sgt. Peckham Is Killed In Action: First Narragansett Indian to Be Killed In Present War", The Westerly Sun, Westerly, Rhode Island, p. 1, August 1, 1944 – via Tomaquag Indian Memorial Museum
