= Esther Ninigret =

Narragansett sachem (died 1777)

Sachem of the Narragansett
- In office 1770–1777
- Preceded by: Thomas Ninigret (brother)
- Succeeded by: George Sachem (son)

Personal details
- Born: Unknown
- Died: 1777 (Note: Chapin says only that she "died during the Revolution" (Chapin 1931, p. 103). The year 1777 is from Simmons (Simmons 1982, p. 84; Simmons 1989, p. 60).)
- Spouse: Thomas Sachem
- Children: George Sachem; Mary Sachem
- Parent(s): George Augustus Ninigret; Sarah Sachem
- Other names: Queen Esther, Esther Sachem

Esther Ninigret (died 1777), known as Queen Esther and in colonial records as Esther Sachem, was the hereditary sachem of the Narragansett in the colony of Rhode Island from 1770 until her death. A great-granddaughter of the Niantic sachem Ninigret, she was the sister of the sachem Thomas Ninigret, known as King Tom, and inherited the office and his heavily indebted estate when he died in November 1769. Chrystal Mars Baker, a Narragansett and Niantic educator at the Tomaquag Museum, uses for her the title saunks, the Narragansett word for a female sachem.

Her accession was contested. In December 1769 a tribal meeting led by the minister Samuel Niles resolved against crowning "any King, Queen or Prince" and asked the Rhode Island General Assembly to replace the sachemship with a council chosen by the tribe, blaming "the extravagancy of our late Kings" for the loss of tribal land. The Assembly instead referred the dispute to arbitrators, and in 1770 Esther was crowned before a crowd of about 500 on a rock near her brother's house in Charlestown, since known as Coronation Rock. An eyewitness's account of the ceremony, recorded in the early 1840s, survives.

The colony recognized her as "the present queen" of the tribe, and she and her council petitioned the Assembly over the sale of her brother's lands to pay his debts. She died during the Revolutionary War and was succeeded by her son George, who was killed in an accident a few years later. He was the last hereditary sachem; after his death the tribe was governed by an elected council.

== Family and early life ==
Esther was a daughter of the sachem George Augustus Ninigret and his wife, Sarah Sachem. (Note: She signed her own petition of 1770 as Esther Sachem, and the colonial records call her by that name (Bartlett 1862, pp. 9, 15). Members of the royal family, including her mother and her husband's father, also used Sachem as a surname (Chapin 1931, p. 111; Mancini & Mars LaRose 2023, p. 148). The name Esther Ninigret, after her father's line, appears in Tucker's history of Charlestown in 1889 (Tucker 1889, p. 23) and is used by Simmons, by Mancini and Mars LaRose, and by the Tomaquag Museum (Simmons 1989, p. 60; Mancini & Mars LaRose 2023, p. 148; Mars Baker 2023). Several unrelated women in 18th-century Rhode Island were called "Queen Esther", among them Esther Hazard, widow of Governor Robert Hazard of Point Judith, who was "styled Queen Esther" for her commanding manner (Updike 1907, pp. 284–285).) Ninigret, the 17th-century sachem of the Niantics, who died in 1676, was her great-grandfather on her father's side.

In Ninigret's time the Niantics, whose homeland centered on present-day Charlestown and Westerly, were tributary to the Narragansett chief sachems (Note: In the 17th century the Narragansetts were led by one or two chief sachems, such as Canonicus and Miantonomi, over the lesser sachems of individual communities (Chapin 1931, pp. 91, 93). Besides "sachem", sources call Esther "queen" (Bartlett 1862, pp. 9, 23) and "queen sachem" (Simmons 1982, p. 84).) Canonicus, Miantonomi and their successors, and the two ruling families were related by marriage. Ninigret kept the Niantics neutral in King Philip's War (1675–1676), in which the Narragansetts were devastated and their other leading sachems were killed. After the war Ninigret's daughter Weunquesh, sachem from 1676 until about 1686, drew the surviving Narragansetts under her authority, and the two peoples merged into one, thereafter usually called Narragansett. The colony recognized Ninigret's heirs as the owners of the remaining tribal land, and his descendants governed the combined tribe from its reservation in Charlestown. (Note: Updike, writing in the 1840s, held that the Ninigret line was "only collaterally related" to the family of the Narragansett sachem Canonicus, and disparaged the Ninigrets for staying neutral in King Philip's War (Updike 1907, pp. 253–254).)

Esther's father, George Augustus Ninigret, succeeded his brother Charles Augustus Ninigret as sachem in 1735. On Charles Augustus's death the succession was disputed, as part of the tribe backed his infant son, Charles, but an assembly of the tribe elected George unanimously. (Note: Potter and Updike wrote that the dispute ended only with the young Charles's death (Potter 1835, p. 99; Updike 1907, p. 254). Chapin found that Charles grew to adulthood. In May 1761, before enlisting in the French and Indian War, he gave up his rights in the rest of the sachem's lands to King Tom in return for land and £500, and he died in service that year (Chapin 1931, pp. 99–100).) He then married Sarah, who was herself of the royal kin: her father, Thomas Sachem, was a half-brother of Ninigret II. (Note: The marriage was performed by Colonel Joseph Stanton (Chapin 1931, p. 99).) George died in 1745. He left three children, Thomas, George and Esther. Thomas, born in 1736, was elected sachem at his father's house on June 21, 1746. Because he was a child, his mother, Sarah, acted as his guardian, and in August 1747 the colony appointed her and eight Indian councillors as his guardians. In 1750 Sarah married John Anthony, a Narragansett, in a ceremony performed by the Anglican minister James MacSparran. Thomas died in November 1769, and Esther succeeded him the following year.

Ninigret (sachem until 1676)
Weunquesh (sachem 1676–c. 1686)	Ninigret II (sachem c. 1686–c. 1722)
Charles Augustus; Ninigret (sachem c. 1722–1735)	George Augustus; Ninigret (sachem 1735–1745)	Sarah Sachem
Thomas Ninigret ("King Tom") (sachem 1746–1769)	George Ninigret (died before 1769)	Esther Ninigret (sachem 1770–1777)	Thomas Sachem
George Sachem (sachem 1777–c. 1779)	Mary Sachem

Esther's family, simplified. Sachems are shaded. (Note: The chart follows Chapin's genealogical table of the Niantic sachems. Weunquesh and Ninigret II were children of Ninigret by different wives (Chapin 1931, pp. 91–93). Mary Sachem had two daughters, both living in 1832 (Chapin 1931, p. 111). A genealogy recorded by the Charlestown town clerk in 1930 and printed in Narragansett Dawn in 1935 gives the same line of sachems but calls Esther both George Ninigret's child and Thomas's daughter (Narragansett Dawn 1935, p. 28).)

== Accession ==
Esther's predecessor was her brother, Thomas Ninigret, known as King Tom. To pay his debts he sold nearly 5,500 acres (2,200 ha) between 1759 and 1766, about half of the remaining reservation. The Rhode Island General Assembly placed his estate under a committee and stopped his credit. A faction led by the minister Samuel Niles and the brothers John and Tobias Shattock tried to depose him. It appealed to Sir William Johnson, the British superintendent of Indian affairs, and in 1768 sent the Shattocks to England to seek the king's support, without success. After King Tom's death the faction sought to abolish the office of sachem and govern the tribe through a council.

King Tom died on November 12, 1769, leaving little but his title. His only son and his brother George had died before him, and according to William Kenyon of Charlestown, who knew the family and in the early 1840s gave his recollections of it to the historian Wilkins Updike, "the crown descended to Esther, the next heir". With the title she inherited her brother's debts and his council of five, which only two months earlier had won the Assembly's permission to sell the tribe's land at Fort Neck to pay them.

Five weeks after King Tom's death, on December 18, 1769, a meeting of the Narragansett tribe at Charlestown resolved to appoint a council of nine with power to conduct "all public affairs relating said Tribe, both spiritual and temporal", to levy taxes and to keep a public fund. It named Niles and eight others to the council. The meeting directed the council to "enter their protest on our behalves against the coronation of any King, Queen or Prince of the said Tribe for the future":

...for that we have for a long time experienced the difficulties arising therefrom, by the extravagancy of our late Kings and the dishonest and insinuating practices of petty shopkeepers and other designing white people, whereby we have with regret seen our lands sold from under our feet and our substance squandered and wasted in an imprudent and unjust manner.

— Resolves of the Narragansett tribe, December 18, 1769

The council was also to ask the governor "to stop any further proceedings in respect to crowning a King, Queen or Prince over said Tribe" until the Assembly had decided.

Both sides came before the General Assembly at South Kingstown at the end of February 1770. Niles's council asked the Assembly to approve the December resolutions, which would have ended the sachemship and placed the tribe's affairs in the hands of the new nine-member council. It warned that without them the Narragansetts would "in a few years... have no land", since "a great part of the very best of it hath already been sold to support the extravagancy of their former Kings". Esther, "calling herself queen of the tribe", petitioned with her husband, Thomas Sachem, and the council that had served her brother for authority to deed King Tom's lands to pay his debts, as he could have done in his lifetime. The two parties agreed to let three colonial officials settle "the disputes and differences subsisting in said tribe" and decide which lands had been King Tom's: Governor Joseph Wanton, the former governor Stephen Hopkins and Joseph Hazard, who already sat on the committee handling King Tom's estate.

The protest did not abolish the sachemship. According to the anthropologist William S. Simmons, the tribe, the legislature and the sachem's family reached a compromise in 1770: they agreed which lands would be sold to pay King Tom's debts, and the tribe agreed to support Esther as his successor. The antiquarian Howard M. Chapin likewise writes that the tribe, having sought to abolish the office, agreed to respect the prerogatives of the royal family. The settlement kept the sachemship but barred any further sale of tribal land once the debts were paid.

== Coronation ==
Charlestown sites
1. Coronation Rock, King Tom Farm
2. Royal Indian Burial Ground
3. Fort Ninigret

Esther was crowned in 1770 (Note: Tucker wrote that the coronation took place "as early as 1770, according to the best information that can be obtained" (Tucker 1889, p. 23). Kenyon gave no year, but his statement, made in the early 1840s, that he had seen the coronation "over seventy years ago" is consistent with 1770. Thomas R. Hazard, quoting Kenyon in 1877, added the date "about 1776" in brackets (Hazard 1877). The December 1769 resolutions show that a coronation was then being prepared (Rhode Island State Archives 1769b).) on a large rock behind King Tom's house in Charlestown, since known as Coronation Rock. William F. Tucker, the historian of Charlestown, described it in 1889 as "an isolated rock, projecting about three feet above the ground", about 12 rods (200 ft) north of King Tom's house. Kenyon, who saw the ceremony, described it to Updike:

I saw her crowned over seventy years ago. She was elevated on a large rock, so that the people might see her; the council surrounded her. There were present about twenty Indian soldiers with guns. They marched her to the rock. The Indians nearest the royal blood, in presence of her councillors, put the crown on her head. It was made of cloth covered with blue and white peage. When the crown was put on, the soldiers fired a royal salute and huzzaed in the Indian tongue. The ceremony was imposing, and everything was conducted with great order. Then the soldiers waited on her to her house, and fired salutes. There were five hundred natives present, besides others.

— William Kenyon, as recorded by Wilkins Updike

Peage, or wampum, is the white and purple shell beads of southern New England. Chrystal Mars Baker, a Narragansett citizen and education manager of the Tomaquag Museum, who calls Esther by the title saunks, the Narragansett word for a female sachem, draws on colonial records and the oral history of Narragansett elders. She describes the crown as made of white wampumpeag and dark suquahog beads, with strands of beads draped around her neck and other adornments marking her position. The anthropologist Ethel Boissevain called the ceremony a "ceremonious, albeit British type, coronation", an example of the respect still accorded the hereditary sachems. At the coronation of Ninigret II, according to Chapin, "his subjects brought him heaps of peage piled upon staves as tokens of loyalty". At George Augustus Ninigret's election in 1735, according to Chapin, an old man of the tribe placed a belt of peage "in lieu of a crown" on his head as he sat in a chair and proclaimed him sachem, "whereupon the rest of the Indians gave some huzzas and fired some guns". King Tom was installed in 1746 with similar ceremonies. The historian Elisha R. Potter Jr. wrote in 1835 that the installation of a Ninigret sachem included "the presentation of peage and other presents, as an acknowledgement of authority; and sometimes a belt of peage was publicly placed on the Sachem's head, as an ensign of rank".

== Reign ==
In June 1770 Esther and her husband petitioned the Assembly as "heir at law to Thomas Ninegret". King Tom's estate was heavily mortgaged, and his creditors were about to sue at the August court, so that interest and legal costs would "swallow up the whole estate, if speedy remedy be not taken". They asked that the lands to be sold be set off at once, and the Assembly agreed. Both signed with their marks. (Note: The petition is printed with the date July 11, 1770, but it is addressed to the session held on the second Monday of June 1770, which fell on June 11 (Bartlett 1862, pp. 14–15).)

In September 1770 Hopkins and Hazard reported that they had convened "all the principal Indians" and persuaded them to agree to sell enough land to pay King Tom's debts, on condition that only land chosen by the tribe be sold and that no more Indian land be sold afterwards. The tribe named the parcels, among them "the large house, the late Sachem Thomas lived in, with twenty-six acres". It also promised "to provide as good a support for the remaining branches of the royal family, as the small remains of their public lands and the loyal affections of a poor people can admit". The Assembly approved the agreement, except for the tribe's request that two of its members be made justices of the peace.

In October 1770 the Assembly empowered "the present queen of said tribe, with five of her council" to deed to the colony, for the use of the tribe's school, the small island in Charlestown on which its schoolhouse stood. King Tom had been authorized to make the deed in 1767 but had died without signing it.

After 1770 the tribe's land was managed by its council rather than by the sachem alone. Esther's husband sat on the council, and by 1772 it also included members of the former opposition, among them Samuel Niles. Sales of King Tom's lands to pay his debts continued. In December 1772 Esther's father-in-law, William Sachem, a member of the council, refused to sign further deeds; according to the researchers Jason Mancini and Silvermoon Mars LaRose, a member of the Narragansett Tribe, he was refusing to sell King Tom's farm. The farm was nevertheless sold to Nathan Kenyon in 1773, in the last sale made to settle the debts. That August, 43 members of the tribe petitioned that "some of our late sachems, through extravagance and indiscretion" had left them only a small part of their lands. The Assembly agreed that the remaining land would be secured to the tribe and could never be taken for debts.

== Death and succession ==
Esther died of natural causes in 1777, during the Revolution. Her son George succeeded her and, according to William Kenyon of Charlestown, who had witnessed her coronation, was crowned after her death. Kenyon, who was recruiting soldiers for the Revolution, asked him to enlist in the Continental Army, but "the squaws objected and told me he was their king". Kenyon also sat on the jury of the inquest into George's death a few years later:

He was about twenty-two years old when he was killed. He was where some persons were cutting trees. One tree had lodged against another, and, in cutting that one, it fell and caught against a third, and, George undertaking to escape, a sharp knee struck him on the head and killed him; a foot either way would have saved him.

— William Kenyon, as recorded by Wilkins Updike

Simmons dates his death to around 1779. Tucker wrote that the place where George was killed, about 60 rods (990 ft) north of the school-house pond, "has often been pointed out". George was the last hereditary Narragansett sachem. (Note: Potter, writing in 1835, does not mention Esther's reign. He says that King Tom "dying, left a son George, who did not survive him more than about two years, being killed by the fall of a tree" (Potter 1835, p. 100). Updike's informant William Kenyon and Chapin both make George Esther's son, and Esther's own petition of 1770 describes her as King Tom's heir (Updike 1907, p. 255; Chapin 1931, p. 103; Bartlett 1862, p. 15).) His sister Mary, who married John Harry, was heir to the sachemship but was never crowned. After George's death the tribe elected a president and four council officers every year. In 1792 the General Assembly made this arrangement law. When the tribe reorganized under a state charter in 1934, it re-established the office of chief sachem as an elected post, and in 1935 its members chose Philip H. Peckham (Night Hawk). Mars LaRose sees the move from hereditary sachems to an elected council as "a return to traditional values": a Narragansett sachem had always had to earn the right to lead, governed with a council, and could be removed if the community judged them inadequate.

== Personal life ==
Unlike her brother, Esther had not been educated in England. She married Thomas Sachem, a son of William Sachem, who was King Tom's maternal uncle and a member of his council. Esther's maternal grandfather had also been named Thomas Sachem. They were married by July 1767, when King Tom gave 181.5 acres (73.5 ha) to "my beloved Uncle William Sachem" and his family, among them Thomas Sachem and his wife, Esther. It was the only land King Tom granted privately to members of the tribe. They had a son, George, and a daughter, Mary.

In 1877 the writer Thomas Robinson Hazard repeated what he had heard from Molly Hazard, a daughter of Sylvester Robinson and granddaughter of William Robinson, a former deputy governor of the colony. According to her, Esther was fond of the Robinsons, wealthy English landowners of South Kingstown, and often visited their houses, but "could not be induced to converse in English", declaring through her interpreter "to the last" that she would never "speak the language of the destroyers of her people". Hazard also told of a little girl of whom Esther was very fond, who begged her as she lay dying to speak one word to her in English. Esther refused, "although tears rolled down" her cheek, torn, as Hazard put it, between her "warring feelings of affection and pride".

== Legacy ==
=== Images ===
"Esther, the last of the Royal Narragansetts", an 1879 engraving after an ambrotype. The sitter was probably Esther Kenyon, Esther's granddaughter.

An engraving titled "Esther, the last of the Royal Narragansetts", published in William Cullen Bryant and Sydney Howard Gay's A Popular History of the United States in 1879, was made after an ambrotype of an elderly woman then living in Westerly. Simmons identifies the sitter as probably Esther Kenyon, one of the daughters of Esther's daughter Mary.

=== Coronation Rock ===
Coronation Rock in 1927, with its sign reading "Coronation Rock 1770"

After Nathan Kenyon bought King Tom's farm in 1773, his family kept it until 1939. In the 1890s James Kenyon, a Providence lumber dealer, made it a summer estate. King Tom's house burned in 1922, and the present Colonial Revival house at King Tom Farm, 4740 Old Post Road, was built in its place. Coronation Rock stands behind it. In 1981 the Rhode Island Historical Preservation Commission described the rock as "a granite boulder" and reported that it had been approved for the National Register of Historic Places. By 1930 the rock, in the dooryard of the house on the Post Road, carried an inscription naming it Coronation Rock. It remains on private land and still bears an inscription.

=== Pageants and reenactments ===
Historical pageants of the early 20th century generally cast non-Native actors in Native roles. In a coronation scene in Westerly's tercentenary pageant, staged in Wilcox Park on August 26, 1936, Esther was played by Ada G. Anderson of Boston, whom the program described as "a direct descendant of the Ninigret royal family", escorted by a bodyguard of Ninigret descendants. She was crowned by the chief sachem, Peckham, and the tribe's medicine man, William L. Wilcox (Chief Pine Tree). The anthropologist Christine N. Reiser sees such performances as part of a wider effort by which New England Native peoples "re-authored public historical imagery in demonstration of their abilities to be both Indigenous and modern citizens". The editor of the Narragansett Dawn, the Narragansett elder Princess Red Wing, wrote that during the tercentenary the tribe had been "called upon to do their part from the days of Canonicus to Queen Esther", and that as a result "Rhode Island knows now, THE NARRAGANSETT TRIBE STILL EXISTS!" That year the tribe also won passage of a state law proclaiming Rhode Island Indian Day.

The coronation had been reenacted many times before it was first staged at Coronation Rock itself, on May 17, 1969, as part of Rhode Island Heritage Month. The Charlestown Historical Society sponsored the event, and Tall Oak (Everett Weeden) and Kenneth Merrifield produced it. Diana Mars (Red Doe), described as a direct descendant of the queen, played Esther. About 20 sixth graders from the Charlestown School, dressed as musket-carrying soldiers, escorted her to the rock, and elders and dancers of the Narragansett tribe took part. After dances, wampum was laid at her feet and she was crowned with a headband before about 200 people.

On May 16, 1970, the 200th anniversary of the coronation, the reenactment was held again at King Tom Farm, with Princess Red Wing, then historian of the Charlestown Historical Society and director of the Tomaquag Indian Museum, as general chairman. Diana Mars, who traced her descent from Esther through her mother's family, again took the part of Esther, and Ferris Dove (Roaring Bull) narrated. Rev. Harold Mars, the tribal prophet, performed the ceremony. Chrystal Mars Baker of the Tomaquag Museum, who took part as a small child and is Diana Mars's niece and Harold Mars's granddaughter, records that about 700 people attended and that the event was planned by members of the Sons and Daughters of First Americans, an Indigenous organization founded in 1938, together with Tall Oak and Harold Mars and Laura Fry Mars, two founders of the Charlestown Historical Society. She argues that reenactments of Native history are appropriate only when they are written and performed by the people whose history they tell.

== See also ==
- Narragansett people
- Ninigret
- Royal Indian Burial Ground
