= Counter-celebration =

Alternative to a holiday or celebration

A counter-celebration or counter-observance or alternative commemoration can be a form of protest of a holiday's commemoration by challenging its dominant narrative with an alternative event, often representing a social cause such as indigenous rights, and involving symbolic subversion in the style of culture jamming.

== Counter-celebrations ==
- Australia Day: Day of Mourning and Invasion Day or Survival Day
- Christmas: Festivus
- Columbus Day: Indigenous Peoples' Day
- Thanksgiving: National Day of Mourning and Unthanksgiving Day
- International Workers' Day: Loyalty Day
- Yom Ha'atzmaut: Nakba Day
  - In 2026 in the United States, remembrances for the victims of the October 7th attacks against Israel were countered with events in remembrance of Gazan civilians who died in the succeeding Gaza war.
- Victory over Japan Day: Shūsen-kinenbi
- Vietnamese Reunification Day: Black April
