= Harold Mars =

The Reverend Harold Sherman Mars Sr. (born 1911, died Nov 25, 1989 aged 78) was a prominent Narragansett Native American Christian preacher in Rhode Island and Upstate New York. He was a pastor at several evangelical churches in Kingston, Rhode Island and Rochester, New York. Besides these posts, Mars also travelled as a visiting preacher across the United States. He held the title of prophet for the Narragansett tribe.

Mars came from a family of preachers connected for generations to the Narragansett Indian Church in Charlestown, Rhode Island. Mars was also a carpenter, cabinet maker and building contractor. He was once pictured on the cover of the Providence Sunday Journal Magazine.

Mars attended Rhode Island State College, the Zion Bible Institute in Haverhill, Massachusetts, and Anderson College in Indiana. He was ordained to Christian ministry in 1938, at the former First Church of God in Kingston. Mars earned five dollars a day during the 1940s preaching to congregations in Providence, Rhode Island, Peace Dale, Rhode Island, and Wakefield.

In 1951 he moved his family to Rochester, where he led the First Church of God for a decade, "in what was essentially a black world". Then Mars returned to Rhode Island to become the pastor of the Narragansett Indian Church in Charlestown. In the 1970s he would return again to Rochester to the First Church of God. During the Rochester years, his family always returned to Rhode Island for the August powwow, and Rev. Mars would preach in the Indian Church on that Sunday. When Mars retired in the 1980s, he and his wife moved to a house in the woods near the old Narragansett reservation in Kingston Rhode Island. Mars died in 1989.

Mars was interviewed by the folklorist William Simmons as a source for New England Native American lore and spirituality. Mars stated that he could trace his ancestry from his father White Buffalo, also a preacher to Christian Indians, to the family of James, brother of "Father Sam" (Samuel Niles), the founder of the Narragansett Indian Church in the 1740s.

Mars and his wife Laura (Fry) Mars had four children: Harold S. Mars Jr.; David K. Mars Sr., former chief sachem of the Narragansett tribe; the Rev. Roland C. Mars (1940-2015), who took over his father's mantle as preacher; and Janice L. Hill. Roland carried on the family preaching tradition into the 21st century, but reached a smaller congregation as many younger Narragansett turned away from Christianity (which they called the religion that “came over on a ship”), and tried to revive their ancestral beliefs.

== Archival sources ==
- Index cards and notes belonging to Mars are kept in a vitrine at the Tamaquag museum in Exeter, Rhode Island.
