= Ella Sekatau =

Poet, ethnohistorian, medicine woman, and prominent member of the Narragansett people

- Firefly-Song of Wind

Narragansett Ethnohistorian and medicine woman

Personal details
- Born: May 10, 1928 Charlestown, Rhode Island
- Died: April 7, 2014 (aged 85) Charlestown, Rhode Island

Ella Wilcox-Thomas Sekatau, or Firefly-Song of Wind, (May 10, 1928 — April 7, 2014) was a poet, historian, and ethnohistorian and medicine woman of the Narragansett Indian Nation. Instrumental in the Narragansett's federal recognition in 1983, she was a powerful cultural and political presence in her community and across the Native American community of New England. Sekatau was one of the first Native American interpreters to partner with Brown University's Heffenreffer Museum of Anthropology in their education program, and was also a key figure for the Wampanoag history program at Plimoth Plantation, now Plimoth Patuxet.

== Early life ==
Born in Charlestown, Rhode Island in 1928, Sekatau was descended from the sachems of the sixteenth and early seventeenth centuries. She was raised from birth to learn Narragansett history, language, and medicine by her parents, grandparents, and other elders.

Beginning in the 1970, Sekatau began acting in an official capacity for the Narragansett people. In that year, she was appointed as an ethnohistorian and medicine woman—a position she inherited through her father's line.

== Federal recognition ==
In 1880, Rhode Island detribalized the Narragansett people. In 1978, their first steps towards federal recognition began. In that year, a lawsuit was settled out of court, in favor of the Narragansett. As a part of the agreement with the federal government, one thousand eight hundred acres of land were returned, supporting the Narragansett's contention that Rhode Island had acted illegally in buying their reserved land because the action violated the Nonintercourse Act of 1790 that requires the federal government to supervise or approve the disposing of tribal land. Following this ruling, in 1983, almost one hundred years following their detribalization, the Narragansett regained federal recognition, backed by copious documentation Sekatau was instrumental in preparing.

== "Documentary genocide" ==
...just as hurtful to native people in the long run, town officials stopped identifying native people as "Indian" in the written record and began designating them as "Negro" or "black," thus committing a form of documentary genocide against them.

— Ella Sekatau, "The Right to a Name: The Narragansett People and Rhode Island Officials in the Revolutionary Era", Ethnohistory, Vol. 44, No. 3 (Summer 1997)

Throughout the 1700s and 1800s, academics and record keepers (like a census-taker), whether intentionally or not, would often replace "Indian" or "Narragansett" with "African," "Black," or "Negro." In her article written with historian Ruth Wallis Herndon, Sekatau writes that Native Americans, regardless of record keepers and historians' perceptions and biases, "often maintained a sense of their own [indigenous] identity, understood that the English system of government sometimes conflicted with their interests, and at times manipulated that system to their advantage."

To Sekatau, though the Indigenous people of Narragansett Bay themselves have persisted throughout history from time immemorial to the modern era, there have been consistent attempts to wipe them from that history. What began with the original tools of conquest and colonialism; disease and violence, quickly shifted in the years prior to and following King Philip's War to develop a new weapon against the Native Americans of the region. A century after the Great Swamp Massacre, English colonists were no longer wielding their swords, guns and fire as weapons, and instead replaced them with a pen. According to Sekatau, this "documentary genocide" began as a discernible trend in the years following the conflict in 1675 and persisted on until Narragansett detribalization in 1880. These Native Americans did not disappear, however, and often still appeared in the record, simply without their "Indian" designation.

Historian Jean O'Brien writes that "the problematic slippage of categories from "Indian" to "Negro," "Black," or "Person of color," vital and other sorts of records that could substantiate Indian demography, increasingly failed to take note of Indian peoples as they steadily lost land and other property in the ongoing workings of colonialism." This method of intended extinction of an entire race was not a new one, and had been used by both the Portuguese and the Spanish for a century prior. Slave traders in Africa would quickly disassociate enslaved peoples from their homelands, using the blanket-term Negro, or "black," to further remove the native African peoples and their ancestors from their kingdoms, tribes or clans.

In 17th and 18th century Narragansett Bay, Rhode Island officials simply extended this designation to Native Americans in the region to systematically strip them of their rights to their land. No longer firing their guns or engulfing forts in flames, English colonists developed a new weapon to wield into the coming centuries. As a result of this concerted effort by officials to strike Native Americans from the record, though they persisted all along, apt historians turn to disciplines like anthropology to help further inform these periods of time where indigenous peoples seem to be absent. As Sekatau wrote: "The war did not end in the Great Swamp."

== Later life ==
Well into her late sixties in the 1990s, Sekatau trained young Narragansett how to maintain their unwritten history through oral tradition. In her capacity as ethnohistorian, she collaborated through oral history with numerous scholars and historians who have published many books and papers on the subject of the Narragansett people.

== Bibliography ==
=== Literary works ===
- Ella W. Brown (Firefly-Song of Wind), Love Poems and Songs of a Narragansett Indian (1971)

=== Historical works ===
- Ruth Wallis Herndon and Ella Wilcox Sekatau, "The Right to a Name: The Narragansett People and Rhode Island Officials in the Revolutionary Era," Ethnohistory, Vol. 44, No. 3 (Summer 1997)
- Ruth Wallis Herndon and Ella Wilcox Sekatau (2005), "Pauper Apprenticeship in Narragansett Country: A Different Name for Slavery in New England," ed. Peter Benes, Slavery/Antislavery in New England,
- Ruth Wallis Herndon and Ella Wilcox Sekatau (2009), "Colonizing the Children: Indian Youngsters in Servitude in Early Rhode Island," eds. Colin G, Calloway and Neal Salisbury, Reinterpreting New England Indians in the Colonial Experience

== See also ==
- Ellison Brown
- Linda Coombs
- Princess Red Wing
- Lorén Spears
- Melissa Tantaquidgeon Zobel
