= Loren Spears =

Lorén M. Spears (Narragansett/Niantic) is an educator, essayist, artist, and two-term Tribal Councilwoman of the Narragansett Tribe in Providence, Rhode Island, where she currently resides. Spears has taught for over two decades, including 12 years in the Newport Public School system working with at-risk children in both first and fourth grades. In 2010, Spears was chosen as one of 11 Extraordinary Women honorees for Rhode Island in the area of education.

== Education ==
Spears is a graduate of Chariho High School, located in Richmond, Rhode Island. She earned her bachelor's degree in elementary education at the University of Rhode Island (1988) and went on to earn her master's degree, also in education, at the University of New England, graduating there in 2002.

== Career and accomplishments ==
In addition to her years spent teaching, Spears has devoted much time to strongly advocating for integrating more Native history and experiential learning into school curricula. Spears is quoted as remembering, “...being in a history class during my elementary days and actually reading that I supposedly didn’t exist, that my family didn’t exist, that my people didn’t exist.” She has spent much of her adult life, therefore, "correcting that misimpression."

Furthermore, Spears works as the executive director and curator of the Tomaquag Indian Memorial Museum in Exeter, Rhode Island. The museum was the site of a private, state-certified school, the Nuweetooun (Narragansett for "Our Home") School, which Spears ran from 2003 to 2010. According to an article by fellow Narragansett mover John Christian Hopkins, the school was founded by Spears with the help of the Narragansett community and donations from many groups, including a local charity, the Narragansett Tribe, as well as the Rhode Island Foundation. Though Spears is Narragansett, the school is not linked to any particular tribe. Nuweetooun gave K-8 Native children an experiential, collaborative curriculum based in Native American traditions and culture, as well as standard academic subjects (i.e. Math, Language Arts, Social Studies, Health and Science). In March 2010, the Supreme Court made a ruling that led to the removal of 31 acres of land out of trust from the Narragansett reservation in Charlestown. Since the tribe had much less land for money-making ventures, they had less money to provide to the school. In addition, in 2010 Rhode Island was hit with devastating floods, which ultimately forced the school to go on hiatus, where it remains today.

Spears was appointed by Gina Raimondo to serve on the Board of the Rhode Island State Council on the Arts and issued as a board member on The Pell Center's Story in the Public Square and South County Tourism Council.

== Works ==
- Spears co-wrote an article in Collections: A Journal for Museum and Archives Professionals with Amanda Thompson about the Tomaquag Museum's praxis for decolonizing its collections management policy, led by Spears’ intellectual labor.
- Along with other Narragansett tribal members, Spears also collaborated with artist Holly Ewald and the Tomaquag Indian Memorial Museum to create Through Our Eyes: An Indigenous View of Mashapaug Pond, a book of collage art, including poetry, photography and stamping, that tells the Indigenous history of Mashapaug Pond.
- Spears has an essay published in The Pursuit of Happiness: An Indigenous View: The Narragansett People Speak, (2005, by Dawn Dove and other Narragansett authors/artists), entitled "Pursuit of Happiness: An Indigenous View on Education." An excerpt from this same essay is also published in Dawnland Voices: An Anthology of Indigenous Writing from New England (editor Siobhan Senier, 2014), along with one of Spears' poems and poems by her young students.

== Awards and honors ==
In June 2005, Spears received the Feinstein Salute to Teachers, Teacher of the Month. In 2006, she earned the Native Heritage Gathering Award. Furthermore, in 2010, Spears was chosen as one of eleven Extraordinary Women honorees for Rhode Island in the area of teaching and education.
