= Unthanksgiving Day =

Annual protest, held in opposition to Thanksgiving in the Western United States

Unthanksgiving Day (or Un-Thanksgiving Day), also known as The Indigenous Peoples Sunrise Ceremony, is an event held on Alcatraz Island in San Francisco Bay to honor the indigenous peoples of the Americas and promote their rights. It coincides with the National Day of Mourning held in Massachusetts. The Alcatraz ceremony has been held annually since 1975 to commemorate the protest event of 1969, where the Alcatraz-Red Power Movement (ARPM) occupied the island. It is organized by the International Indian Treaty Council and American Indian Contemporary Arts.

The event is designed to commemorate the survival of Indian tribes following the European colonization of the Americas. Organizers want it to serve in contrast and counter-celebration to the traditional American Thanksgiving in which the Pilgrims shared a meal with the Wampanoag tribe.

== Background ==
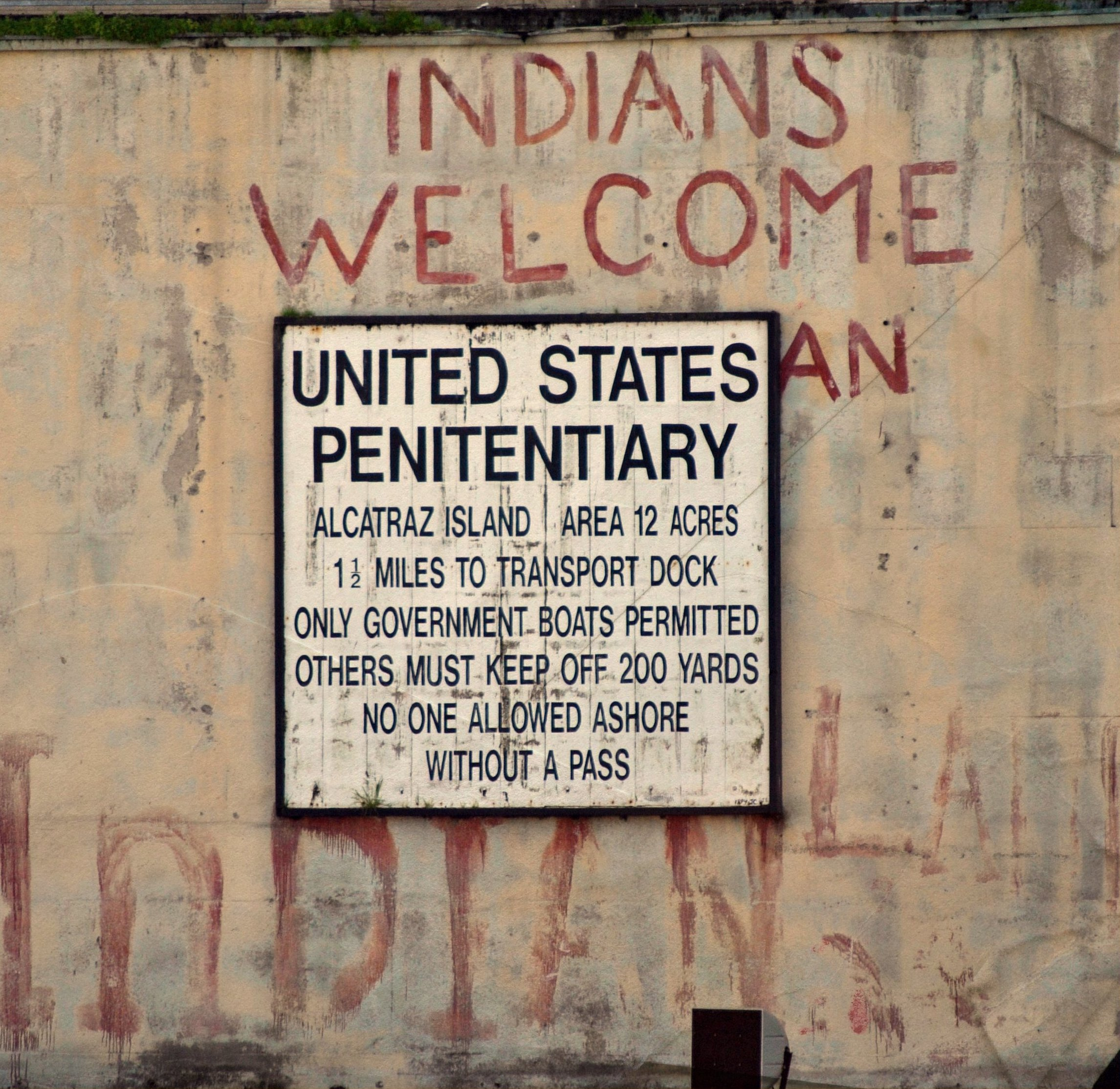
Graffiti still visible in 2010 on Alcatraz Island from the 1975 IAT occupation.

In 1969, a number of Native American members of the Alcatraz-Red Power Movement group Indians of All Tribes (IAT) occupied the island of Alcatraz, under the terms of the 1868 Treaty of Fort Laramie that allocated surplus government land to Native Americans. The occupation lasted for 19 months, from November 20, 1969, to June 11, 1971. They were visited by members of the American Indian Movement (AIM) who, inspired by the occupation, led other protests, the first on Thanksgiving in 1970 when they painted Plymouth Rock red. The latter protest continued as the National Day of Mourning. The US government ended the Alcatraz occupation with force. During the occupation, hundreds of Native Americans joined the movement to speak out for their rights. This was part of a heavy period of Indian activism and protest at a time when the civil rights movement in the United States amongst minorities was at its height.

== Contemporary observance ==
Every year on the date of the United States Thanksgiving holiday in November, several thousand indigenous people and spectators travel to Alcatraz Island. Groups dance before sunrise to honor their ancestors, while other groups demonstrate other aspects of their cultures and heritage and speak out for the rights of their people. The celebration is open to the public.

A similar sunrise ceremony at Alcatraz Island is also held on Indigenous Peoples' Day.
