= United American Indians of New England =

The United American Indians of New England (UAINE) is a Native American activist organization founded by Frank "Wamsutta" James (Aquinnah Wampanoag, 1924-2001). He founded the organization in 1970 after being “uninvited” to make a speech at a celebration hosted by the Commonwealth of Massachusetts.

The Commonwealth wanted to celebrate the friendly relations of their forefathers and the Wampanoag people; however, when the speech that James was going to give was reviewed, it was deemed inappropriate for the celebration because it focused on the negative ways the Wampanoag people had been treated by the Pilgrims at Plymouth and did not celebrate the brotherhood the planners wanted to show. When he was given a revised speech that was written by a person in public relations, James decided that he would not attend the celebration. Instead, he chose to protest the silencing of the Native Americans by gathering supporters, going to Cole's Hill overlooking Plymouth Harbor, and giving his speech there.

The supporters he gathered on that day became the United American Indians of New England; the group still leads the National Day of Mourning each year to continue what James started.

== Today ==
Today UAINE is an organization of and led by Native people and their supporters. The goal of UAINE is to fight back against prejudice toward Native people, the issues of the Pilgrim mythology perpetuated in Plymouth, and the United States' assault on poor people. They also are fighting for the freedom of Leonard Peltier as well as other political prisoners. They work to support Indigenous struggles in New England and throughout America. They also protest the use of racist terms used as team names and mascots in sports teams throughout the country. To get their message out, they speak to children at schools and at universities. They welcome the support of indigenous people from all parts of the Americas as well as the support from non-Native people. They hold a strong belief that it is their duty to support all those who struggle including the lesbian and gay community, the disabled, and other communities of color. UAINE receives no funding from the government and relies solely on the support of others any money that they may receive from speaking engagement go directly to UAINE coffers. There are no paid staff members of UAINE.

== See also ==
- National Day of Mourning (United States protest)
