= National Day of Mourning (United States protest) =

United States Thanksgiving Day protest

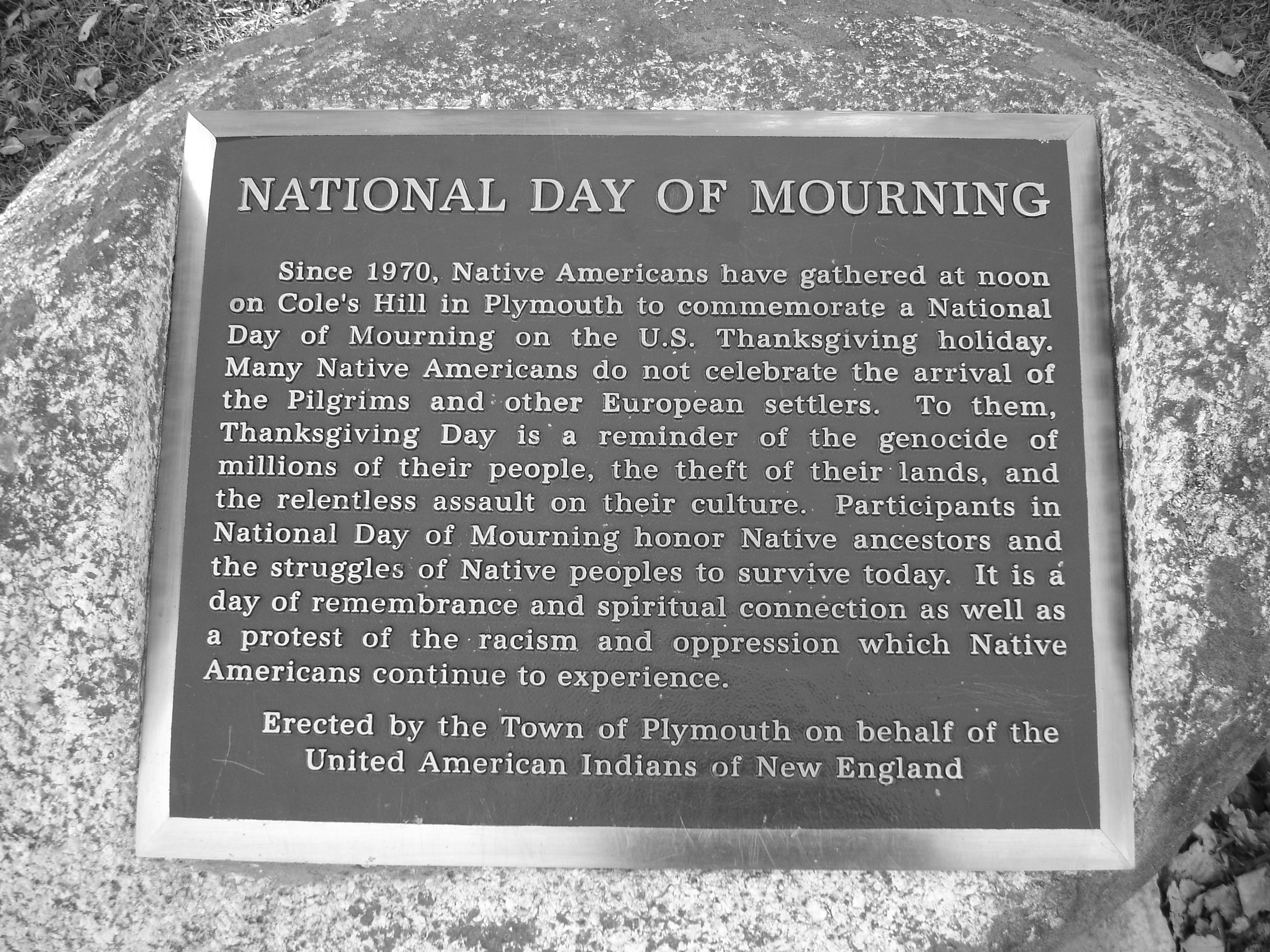
- The National Day of Mourning plaque on Cole's Hill in Plymouth, Massachusetts
- Observed by: Native Americans in the United States
- Significance: Honoring ancestors, acknowledging current struggles of Native people, remembrance, spiritual connection, protest of racism and oppression, dispelling of Thanksgiving mythology
- Observances: Gathering and protest held in lieu of Thanksgiving celebrations in the United States
- Date: Fourth Thursday in November
- 2025 date: November 27
- 2026 date: November 26
- 2027 date: November 25
- 2028 date: November 23
- Frequency: Annual
- Related to: Thanksgiving (United States); Unthanksgiving Day

The National Day of Mourning is an annual demonstration, held on the fourth Thursday in November, that aims to educate the public about Native Americans in the United States, notably the Wampanoag and other tribes of the Eastern United States; dispel myths surrounding the Thanksgiving story in the United States; and raise awareness toward historical and ongoing struggles facing Native American tribes. The first National Day of Mourning demonstration was held in 1970 after Wamsutta Frank James's speaking invitation was rescinded from a Massachusetts Thanksgiving Day celebration commemorating the 350th anniversary of the landing of the Mayflower. James instead delivered his speech on Cole's Hill in Plymouth, Massachusetts next to a statue of Ousamequin, where he described Native American perspectives on the Thanksgiving celebrations. The gathering became an annual event organized by the United American Indians of New England (UAINE) and coincides with both Thanksgiving Day in the United States and with Unthanksgiving Day, an annual ceremony held on Alcatraz Island in California.

== History ==
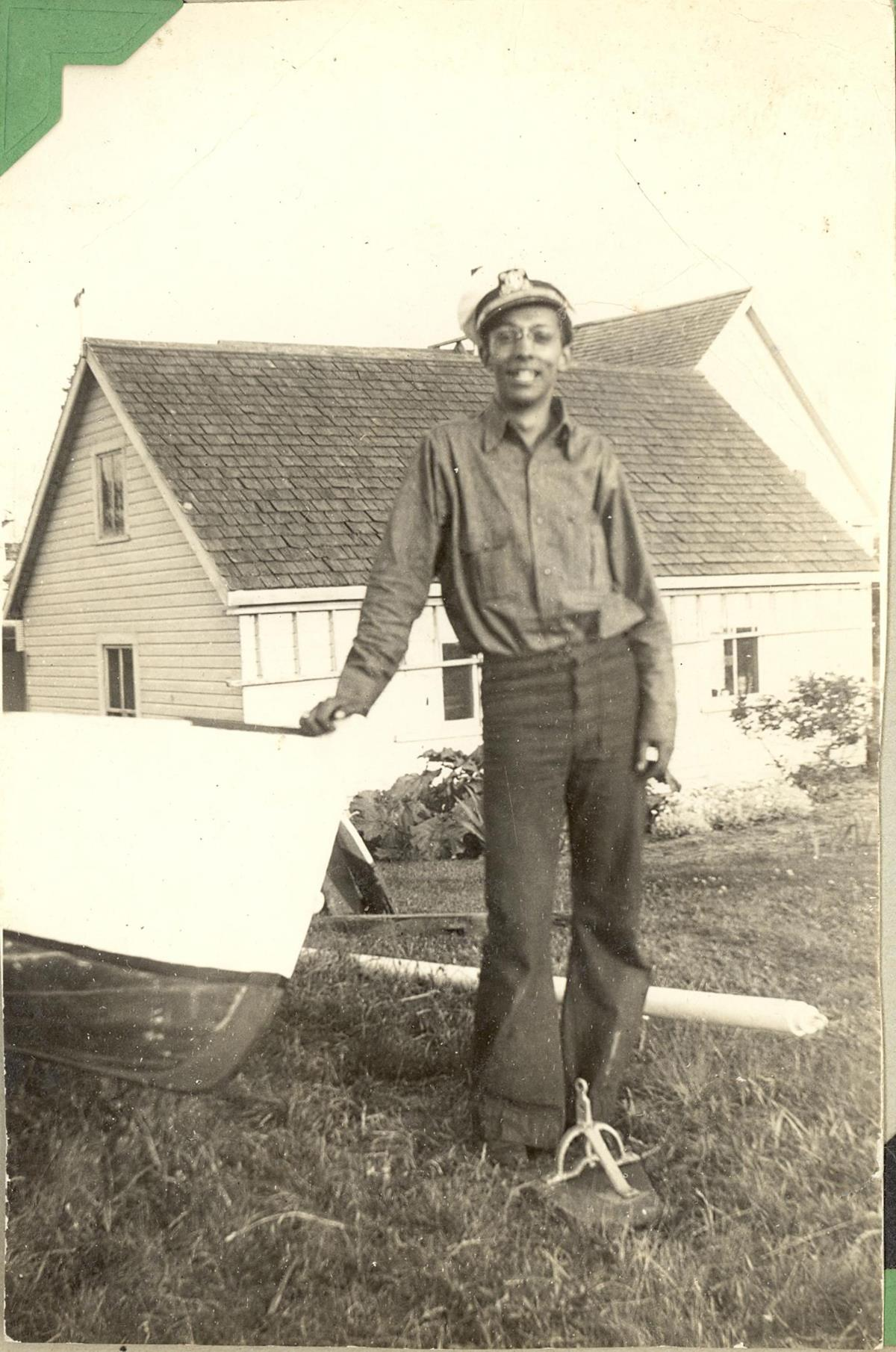
Wamsutta Frank JamesAquinnah Wampanoag, 1923–2001)

=== James's speech cancelled ===
In the fall of 1970, the Commonwealth of Massachusetts held a commemorative Thanksgiving celebration on the 350th anniversary of the first landing of the Mayflower. The event's organizers, including Governor Francis Sargent, invited James to speak at the event. James was the leader of the Wampanoag Tribe of Gay Head (then unrecognized by the United States government) and president of the Federated Eastern Indian League. Wamsutta took his name after the former Wampanoag leader.

The event's organizers requested to review James's speech in advance of the event. Once it had been reviewed, James was informed that he would not be permitted to give the speech as written. Of particular dispute was James's depiction of the winter of 1620-21, in which Pilgrims scavenged corn and beans found in burial grounds in a desperate bid to fend off starvation; James had planned to use his speech to accuse the Pilgrims of grave robbing and theft. An alternate speech, written by the event's public relations team, was provided to him. A representative from the Department of Commerce and Development explained to James that

"...the theme of the anniversary celebration is brotherhood and anything inflammatory would have been out of place."
Representative for the Commonwealth of Massachusetts, November 1970

According to a recollection from Tall Oak Weeden, who continued to participate in modern National Days of Mourning until his death in 2022, the event organizers anticipated that James's accusations would have been rejected by most of those in attendance, had he been allowed to issue them: "we can’t allow you to read that (be)cause 90% of the people would walk out."

=== Initial event ===
Wamsutta Frank James, Tall Oak Weeden, Gary Parker, Shirley Mills, Rayleen Bey, and several other people organized speakers, recruited attendees on a national scale, and arranged accommodations for out-of-town guests.

The first National Day of Mourning event was held on Thanksgiving Day, November 26, 1970, on Cole's Hill in Plymouth, Massachusetts. James delivered an amended speech beside a statue of Ousamequin, including

"We forfeited our country. Our lands have fallen into the hands of the aggressor. We have allowed the white man to keep us on our knees. What has happened cannot be changed, but today we must work towards a more humane America, a more Indian America, where men and nature once again are important; where the Indian values of honor, truth, and brotherhood prevail.

You the white man are celebrating an anniversary. We the Wampanoags will help you celebrate in the concept of a beginning. It was the beginning of a new life for the Pilgrims. Now, 350 years later it is a beginning of a new determination for the original American: the American Indian."
Frank "Wamsutta" James, first National Day of Mourning, November 26, 1970

The event was attended by close to 500 Native Americans from throughout the United States and has been held annually on the fourth Thursday in November every year since. James's speech was one of the first public criticisms of the Thanksgiving story from Native American groups.

== Later protests ==
The United American Indians of New England (UAINE), founded by James in 1970, continues to organize the annual National Day of Mourning rally at Cole's Hill. The event's objectives include

- Education around the history of the Wampanoag people
- Dispelling of the mythology commonly taught as part of the Thanksgiving story
- Awareness of historical and ongoing struggles of Native American tribes

=== Controversy 1995–97 ===
At the 1995 event, protestors dumped sand and seaweed on Plymouth Rock as part of the demonstration. In 1997, police attacked peaceful National Day of Mourning marchers, which included the use of pepper spray. Twenty-five marchers were arrested and charged with misdemeanor as well as felony crimes. Plymouth agreed to drop the charges in a 1998 settlement with UAINE.

=== Modern commemoration ===
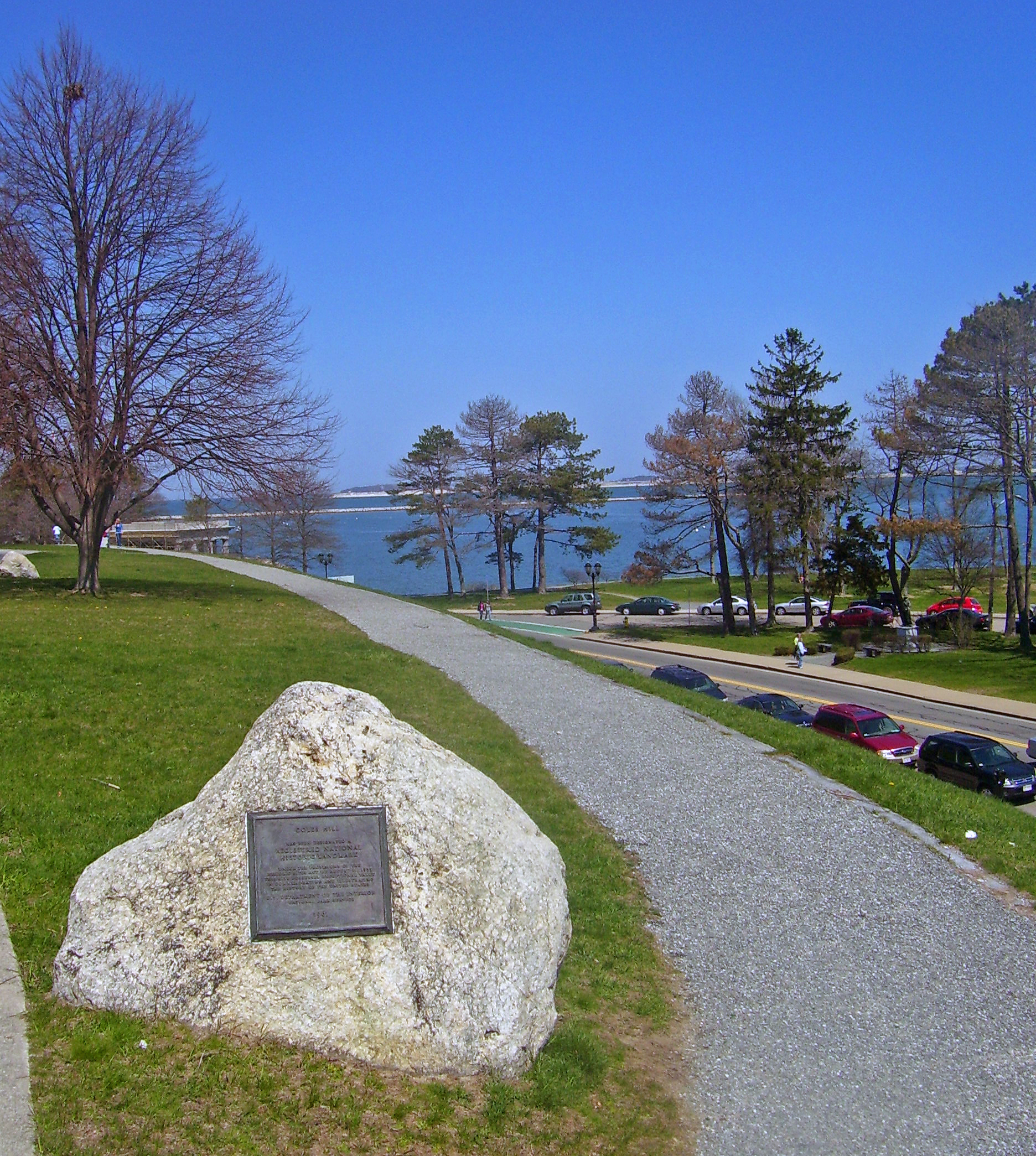
Cole's Hill in Plymouth, where the annual National Day of Mourning gathering is held.

The National Day of Mourning protest is held annually at Cole's Hill and is attended by several hundred participants. Estimates of attendance in 2021 range from 1,000 – 2,000. James's son Moonanum Roland James continued to be involved in the event until his death in December 2020, and James's granddaughter Kisha James helps organize it in her role as UAINE youth coordinator. Mahtowin Munro has been co-leader since the 1990s.

During the COVID-19 pandemic, the rally was held both in-person and virtually, and over 1600 people tuned in to the livestream and more than 20,000 to the online video.
