= Tomaquag Indian Memorial Museum =

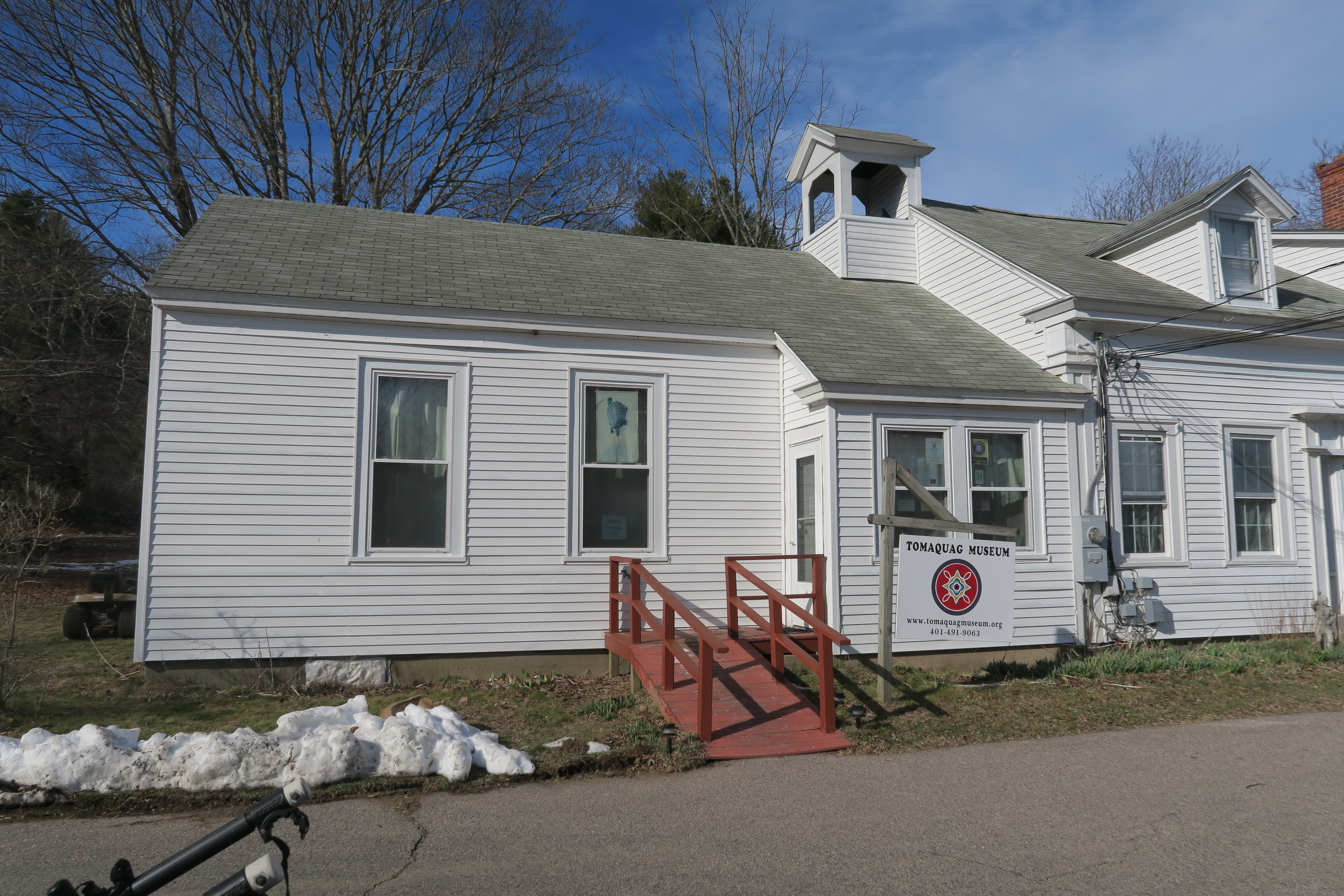

- Location within Rhode Island Location within the United States
- Established: 1958
- Location: 390 Summit Rd, Exeter, Rhode Island USA
- Coordinates: 41.5575°N 71.69785°W
- Founder: Princess Red Wing

The Tomaquag Indian Memorial Museum is an Indigenous-led museum in Exeter, Rhode Island. The museum was founded by anthropologist Eva Butler and a Narragansett and Wompanoag woman named Princess Red Wing in 1958.

The Tomaquag Museum's mission focuses on the education of all our relations on the Indigenous cultures of the Dawnland (focus Southern New England). The museum won a National Medal for Museum and Library Service in 2016. The museum was nominated by U.S. Senator Sheldon Whitehouse.

== Collection ==
The museum showcases the history and culture of the Indigenous peoples who have lived and currently reside in southeastern New England including the Narragansett, Niantic, Wompanoag and Nipmuck. Exhibits include traditional crafts, such as ash splint baskets and locally made dolls, historical archives dating back to the 1880s, culture and important Indigenous figures including Princess Red Wing and Ellison "Tarzan" Brown Sr. The museum's grounds include a wetu (traditional domed hut) and a traditional Three Sisters garden with corn, beans and squash. There is also a forest and an outdoor Friendship Circle.

== History ==
The site of the museum was originally home to the Dovecrest Restaurant and Trading Post, founded by Eleanor and Ferris Dove. The Dove family donated their personal property soon thereafter to establish a permanent home for the museum.

In 2003, Lorén Spears founded the Nuweetooun School on the site of the museum. It was a private school for grades K-8. Open to any student, it focused on Indigenous youth. Nuweetooun School was closed in Spring of 2010 due to damage from flooding.

The Tomaquag Museum is in process of moving to the campus of the University of Rhode Island in Kingston, Rhode Island as of November 2024.

The museum is open on Wednesdays and on weekends.

== See also ==
- List of museums in Rhode Island
- The Narragansett Dawn
