= Simeon Simons =

Pokanoket leader

Personal details
- Born: 1759 Pachaug
- Died: 1835 (aged 75–76) Connecticut
- Children: Simeon Simons

Simeon Simon (1759-1835) was George Washington's bodyguard and a chief of the Pokanoket people.

== Life ==
Simon was born in Griswold, Connecticut (called Pachaug at the time) in 1759 during the French and Indian Wars, and died in 1835 at age 76. A card file at the Providence Public Library in Rhode Island states that he was a colored man, with a note at the bottom of the card: "'Colored'" as distinguished from Negro. He was said to have been a full blood American Indian, Pokanoket Tribe".

Simons was a descendant of Massasoit, Wampanoag chief in Massachusetts at the time of the Pilgrim's landing, and also of Massasoit's son Metacomet—better known as King Philip, Indian leader during the King Philip's War. Simons' Revolutionary War Pension states that he was born in Norwich, Connecticut; however, Norwich included part of Griswold and other towns at the time. According to Griswold legend, General George Washington stopped to refresh himself in Pachaug on the way to Boston in June 1775. Word of his arrival spread rapidly throughout the small community, and Washington noticed a group of young men engaged in exercises such as leaping and wrestling. One of them was Simons, and he allegedly impressed the general with his athletic carriage. Washington summoned him to his room and asked him to be his bodyguard, and Simon remained with him throughout the Revolutionary War.

The Marquis de Lafayette visited Johnson Tavern in Jewett City on August 22, 1824 and met many who had known Washington from the Revolutionary War, one of whom was Simons.
