= John Christian Hopkins =

American journalist

John Christian Hopkins (July 6,1960) is a Narragansett journalist, author, poet and public speaker who resides in Tuba City, Arizona, United States. After having grown up in Hope Valley, Rhode Island, Hopkins graduated from the University of Rhode Island with degrees in journalism and history in 1987.

Hopkins is a career journalist who has worked at newspapers across New England, in New York, Florida, most recently in Arizona. He was a former nationally syndicated newspaper columnist for Gannett News Service. As a child Hopkins slept clutching books to his chest and dreamed of becoming an author. “I’ve never wanted to do anything else but write,” Hopkins said. He and his wife Sararesa live on her Navajo reservation in Fort Defiance, Arizona.

== Journalism ==
Hopkins spent time as a nationally syndicated newspaper columnist for the Gannett News Service, and has also written for USA Today, The News-Press, The Pequot Times, The Westerly Sun, Indian Country Today Media Network, News from Indian Country and Native Peoples magazine. His work has received recognition from the Gannett Awards and the Native American Journalists Association (NAJA) Awards. In 2003, he became the first member of the NAJA to receive awards in four different writing categories during the same year (news, features, sports and columns). Hopkins is one of very few Narragansett writers, and one of very few opinion columnists from any tribe at the time his career began, as noted in Sage's Encyclopedia of Journalism (p. 320). Since 2015 he has been covering Navajo culture and politics for the Lake Powell Life News.

== Publications ==
Hopkins has published five books: Carlomagno in 2003, Nacogdoches in 2004, The Pirate Prince Carlomagno in 2011, Twilight of the Gods in 2011, Rhyme or Reason: Narragansett Poetry in 2012, "Two Guns" in 2014, "Writer on the Storm: a collection of columns" in 2014, and "Loki: God of Mischief" in 2014.

While Hopkins has been in the journalism business for twenty-plus years, he also delved into writing novels over the last decade. His first book, Carlomagno, is based on King Philip's War, fictionally elaborating on the story of King Philip's captured son, whom he names "Carlomagno." Hopkins's long love of westerns is apparent in Nacogdoches, which follows “The Rango Kid,” as he impersonates a sheriff and finds himself forced to stand up to a criminal. The Prince of Carlomagno continues to tell a story of a young Native American's struggles to elude slavery. In Twilight of the Gods, Hopkins explores the science fiction genre by writing about the supernatural coming to life, based on the Mayan calendar's predictions. He then wrote Rhyme or Reason: Narragansett Poetry, which touches on Narragansett tribal history. Most recently in 2014, Hopkins published three books: "Two Guns", a new western fiction; "Writer on the Storm: a collection of columns", a collection of observations concerning images in popular culture; and "Loki: God of Mischief", a mythological thriller about Loki, the Norse god of mischief.

In 1999, Hopkins published a tribute in The Westerly Sun to his grand uncle, the famous runner Ellison Brown. The tribute is excerpted in Michael Ward's 2006 book, Ellison Tarzan Brown: The Narragansett Indian Who Twice Won the Boston Marathon.
