= William Simmons (anthropologist) =

American anthropologist

- Born: September 10, 1938
- Died: June 2, 2018 (aged 79)

Academic background
- Education: Brown University (B.A.); Harvard University (M.A., Ph.D.)

Academic work
- Institutions: UC Berkeley; Brown University

William Scranton Simmons (September 10, 1938 – June 2, 2018) was an American anthropologist specializing in the culture and history of the Narragansett people.

== Life and career ==
Born in Rhode Island, Simmons attend Classical High School. He subsequently enrolled at Brown University where he received a degree in human biology in 1960. During his undergraduate studies he carried out archeological fieldwork in Alaska with archaeologist J. Louis Giddings. Simmons completed his M.A. and Ph.D. in anthropology at Harvard University, and took a position at the University of California Berkeley from 1967 to 1998. First as a professor in the Department of Anthropology, and then as Dean of the Division of Social Sciences.

In 1998 Simmons returned to Brown University as Professor of Anthropology, and as Provost and also served as Acting Director of the Haffenreffer Museum from 2012–2013. He was known among his friends and students for his trademark cowboy boots.

He was married to Cheryl Simmons, and had two daughters.

== Research ==
He wrote three books and numerous articles and chapters on Native American religion, including studies of mortuary ritual, religious conversion, mythological narrative. He also worked intensively with the Native groups of southern New England including Narragansett, Pequot, Mohegan, Massachusett, and Wampanoag, and also in California among the Northern Maidu. He frequently worked collaboratively with Native scholars on topics related to petitions for federal recognition.

He also worked in Africa doing field research with the Badyaranke of Senegal, publishing a book and several articles on traditional religion, witchcraft, and conversion to Islam.

=== Selected publications ===
- Simmons, W. S. (1988). Culture theory in contemporary ethnohistory. Ethnohistory, 35(1), 1–14.
- Simmons, W. S. (1981). Cultural Bias in the New England Puritans' Perception of Indians. The William and Mary Quarterly: A Magazine of Early American History, 56–72.
- Hammel, E. A., & Simmons, W. S. (1970). Man makes sense: a reader in modern cultural anthropology. Little, Brown.
- Simmons, W. S. (1986). Spirit of the New England Tribes: Indian History and Folklore, 1620–1984. UPNE.
- Simmons, W. (1979). The Great Awakening and Indian Conversion in Southern New England. Algonquian Papers-Archive, 10.
- Simmons, W. S. (1997). Indian peoples of California. California History, 76(2/3), 48–77.
- Simmons, W. S. (1985). Anthropology, history, and the North American Indian. A review article. Comparative Studies in Society and History Vol. 27, No. 1 (Jan., 1985), pp. 174–182
- Simmons, W. S., & Speck, F. (1985). Frank Speck and" The Old Mohegan Indian Stone Cutter". Ethnohistory, 155–163.
- Simmons, W. S., Morales, R., Williams, V., & Camacho, S. (1997). Honey Lake Maidu Ethnogeography of Lassen County, California. Journal of California and Great Basin Anthropology, 2–31.
- Simmons, W. S. (2002). From Manifest Destiny to the Melting Pot: The Life and Times of Charlotte Mitchell, Wampanoag. Smithsonian Contributions to Anthropology, (44).
- Simmons, W. S. (1980). powerlessness, exploitation and the soul‐eating witch: an analysis of Badyaranke witchcraft. American ethnologist, 7(3), 447–465.
- Simmons, W. S. (1983). Red Yankees: Narragansett Conversion in the Great Awakening. American Ethnologist, 10(2), 253–271.
- Simmons, W. S., & Aubin, G. F. (1975). Narragansett kinship. Man in the Northeast, 9, 21–31.
- Simmons, W. S. (1982). Return of the Timid Giant: Algonquian Legends of Southern New England. Algonquian Papers-Archive, 13.
