= Princess Red Wing =

Historian and curator from Connecticut and Rhode Island, U.S. (1896–1987)

- Born: Mary E. Glasko; March 21, 1896; Sprague, Connecticut
- Died: December 2, 1987 (aged 91); Rhode Island
- Other names: Mary E. Congdon, Mary E. Peek
- Known for: founding the Tomaquag Indian Memorial Museum

Princess Red Wing, aka Mary E. (Glasko) Congdon, (March 21, 1896 – December 2, 1987) was a Narragansett and Pokanoket elder, historian, folklorist, and museum curator. She studied American Indian history and cultures, and she once addressed the United Nations.

== Early life and education ==
"Princess Red Wing" was born Mary E. Glasko on March 21, 1896, in Sprague, Connecticut to Walter and Hannah Glasko (née Weeden). She said that her mother chose to call her Princess Red Wing after the red-winged blackbird "to fling her mission far with grace". Her mother was a Pokanoket and her father was a Narragansett, and she was related to prominent Native Americans such as Simeon Simons, who fought with George Washington, and Metacomet, who is remembered for waging King Philip's War against the colonies in New England in the 1670s.

== Career ==
Red Wing was the co-founder and editor of The Narragansett Dawn tribal newspaper which was published from 1935 to 1936. She became "Squaw Sachem" of the New England Council of Chiefs in 1945, a position which allowed her to preside over ceremonies and festivals. She was also a prominent storyteller in the Narragansett community, keeping alive the oral traditions of her tribe. She preserved their history by founding the Tomaquag Indian Memorial Museum in Rhode Island. From 1947 to 1970, she served as a member of the Speaker's Research Committee of the under-secretariat of the United Nations.

== Honors ==
In 1975, she was awarded an honorary doctorate of human affairs by the University of Rhode Island. In 1978, she was inducted into the Rhode Island Heritage Hall of Fame. USA Today named her one of Rhode Island's "Women of the Century" in August 2020.

== Personal life ==
Red Wing was married to Horace Peek until his death in 1927, then to Daniel Congdon from 1936 to his death in 1959. She died on December 2, 1987, at age 91 and was buried in Pascoag, Rhode Island.

== Legacy ==
Princess Red Wing was recognized for her work as a storyteller for helping preserve and transmit Narragansett oral traditions. She often referred to her stories as “stories of the simple why,” which formed a central part of her narrative legends. She emphasized the cultural importance of storytelling, stating that “In a society of storytellers, nothing can ever die.”

Her storytelling about legends included traditional narratives and teachings like The Moon of Storytelling and The Drum Speaks, which reflected Indigenous oral history and values. These stories often conveyed ancestral wisdom and emphasized themes of community, patience, and cultural continuity. Here are a few examples: The Moon of Storytelling, The Drum Speaks, When the drum speaks, the people gather. The Native never hurried. Ancestral wisdom, legends, anecdotes, and myths came as naturally to her as speech itself.

== Museum work ==
She co-founded the Tomaquag Indian Memorial Museum in 1958 alongside anthropologist Eva Butler, with the aim of preserving and promoting the history and culture of Indigenous peoples in southern New England.

The museum is the only institution in Rhode Island dedicated entirely to the history and culture of Indigenous peoples of the region. It was originally established in Tomaquag Valley in Hopkinton, Rhode Island, and later relocated to Arcadia Village in Exeter in the early 1970s. It is also recognized as the only museum in the state operated by Indigenous people.
