= The Narragansett Dawn =

- Type: Monthly newspaper
- Founder(s): Princess Red Wing and Ernest Hazard
- Founded: 1935
- Ceased publication: 1936
- Price: $0.25/issue, $1.00/year

The Narragansett Dawn was a monthly newspaper that discussed the history, culture and language of the Narragansett tribe. It was produced in 1935 and 1936, with a total of seventeen issues. Articles included poetry, business directories, Narragansett language lessons, social notes, humor, editorials, stories and community notes. Princess Red Wing and Ernest Hazard were the paper's founders and editors. Both were Narragansett tribal members.

The newspaper came about because of the Narragansett people's need to retain their history and cultural identity in the wake of the Indian Reorganization Act. In many of the paper's editorials, Princess Red Wing invokes the Narragansett people's pride, often in reply to claims against their ancestry and purity during their detribalization by the state of Rhode Island in the 1880s.

== History ==
The Narragansett Dawn was part of a flourishing of small indigenous newsletters in New England. In the 1880s, the Narragansett people lost their federal recognition due to persistent lobbying by settlers in Rhode Island for detribalization. The Narragansett Dawn began as a monthly publication on May 1, 1935, to share "news, recipes, family stories, and poetry," as well as versions of oral narratives and lessons in the Narragansett language. Publication continued until 1936.

== Design ==
=== Name ===
The name The Narragansett Dawn was chosen at a tribal meeting on December 4, 1934. It was said to signify "the awakening after so long and black a night of being civilized."

=== Slogan and seal ===
The Narragansett Dawn used the slogan "We Face East" on its cover. Its meaning is broken down as follows:

- We: "Every descendant of the Narragansett Tribe of Indians"
- Face: "Your Creator"
- East: "With the first light, each dawn"

The cover also bears the official seal of the Narragansett Indian Tribe.

=== Sections ===
Narragansett Tongue

- This section contained lessons on common vocabulary, such as the names of animals, plants, and types of buildings, in the Narragansett language. There were 13 lessons in all.

Genealogy

- This section traced the lineage, both paternal and maternal, of significant figures in the Narragansett community.

Narragansett Mailbox and Greetings From Friends

- This section was similar to a "letter to the editor" section and contained letters written to the newspaper by its readers, both Indian and non-Indian. The letters mostly served to praise the paper or the tribe.

Identity

- This section described Narragansett items and values that displayed their cultural identity. They appear with varying titles pertaining to their topic, such as "Narragansett Fires" and "Pipe of Peace."

Milestones

- This section contained small bits of news, such as the announcement of births, deaths, weddings, and notable visits, that occurred in and around the Narragansett reservation in Rhode Island.

Sunrise News

- This section was written for each issue by the Keeper of Records and contained information on small, notable things that had taken place in the Narragansett community in each respective month.

Poetry

- The newspaper published short, original poems by Narragansett writers, often with religious or natural themes. These poems were usually related to the Narragansett tribe or their values and ideas in some way. An excerpt: "All that eye and heart could own / Rich domains to roam at will / When the morning sun went down / See him on his eastern hill"

History

- These short articles offered a Narragansett perspective on historical events such as the first Thanksgiving and King Philip's War.

== Contributors ==
- Princess Red Wing, Editor
- Ernest Hazard, Editor
- Marion W. Brown, Keeper of Records
- Chief Pine Tree, Business Manager/Writer
- Theodore Brown, Business Manager
- Francis Glasko, Business Manager
- Princess Wood Dove
- Lone Wolf
- Little Bear
