= Narragansett people =

Native American tribe from Rhode Island, US

Narragansett
Total population
- About 3,000

Regions with significant populations
- United States (Rhode Island); 41°24′34″N 71°40′03″W

Languages
- English, formerly Narragansett

Religion
- Traditional tribal religion Christianity

Related ethnic groups
- Nipmuc, Niantic, Pawtuxet, Pequot, Shawomet

The Narragansett people are an Indigenous people of the Northeastern Woodlands. Today, Narragansett people are enrolled in the federally recognized Narragansett Indian Tribe, headquartered in Rhode Island. Their Narragansett language belongs to the Algonquian language family.

The tribe was nearly landless for most of the 20th century but acquired land in 1991 and petitioned the Department of the Interior to take the land into trust on their behalf. This would have made the newly acquired land officially recognized as part of the Narragansett Indian reservation, taking it out from under Rhode Island's legal authority. In 2009, the United States Supreme Court ruled against the request in their lawsuit Carcieri v. Salazar, declaring that tribes which had achieved federal recognition since the 1934 Indian Reorganization Act did not have standing to have newly acquired lands taken into federal trust and removed from state control.

== Name and origin ==
The name Narragansett has been translated as "people of the little points and bays" and "(People) of the Small Point". Linguist James Hammond Trumbull wrote that naiag or naiyag means a corner or angle in the Algonquian languages, so that the prefix nai is found in the names of many points of land on the sea coast and rivers of New England (e.g. Nayatt Point in Rhode Island and Noyack on Long Island). The word nai-ig-an-set, according to Trumbull, signifies "the territory about the point", and nai-ig-an-eog means "the people of the point".

Narragansetts were first written about in the 17th century, and their name was spelled in many different ways, including Nanohigganset, Nanhyganset, Nanhiggonsick, Nanhigonset, Nanihiggonsicks, Nanhiggonsicks, Narriganset, Narrogonset, and Nahigonsicks.

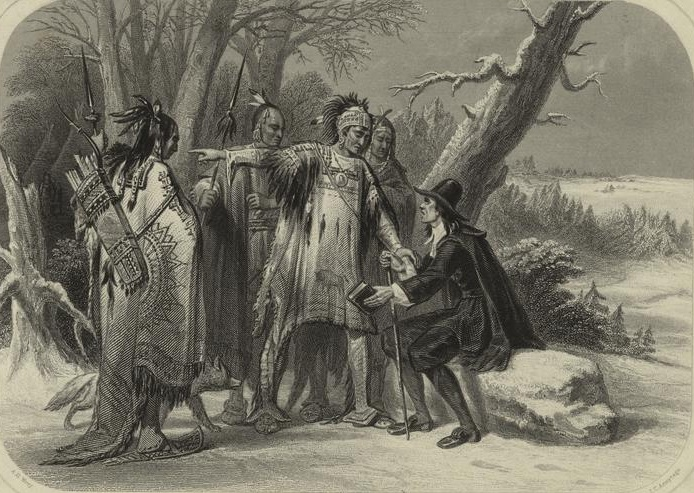
Roger Williams and the Narragansetts, a 19th-century engraving after a painting by A. H. Wray

Roger Williams learned the tribe's language and wrote A Key into the Language of America in 1643. In that book, Williams gave the tribe's name as Nanhigganeuck though later he used the spelling Nahigonset. He traced the source of the word Narragansett to a geographical location:

Being inquisitive of what root the title or denomination Nahigonset should come I heard that Nahigonsset was so named from a little island, between Puttaquomscut and Mishquomacuk on the sea and fresh water side. I went on purpose to see it, and about the place called Sugar Loaf Hill I saw it and was within a pole of it [i.e. a rod or 16 1/2 feet], but could not learn why it was called Nahigonset.

Berkeley anthropologist William Simmons (1938–2018), who specialized in the Narragansett people, confirms Williams's view but wrote that the precise location of the place seen by Williams could not be determined.

But in fact, Roger Williams's statement does enable a fairly precise localization: He states that the place was "a little island, between Puttaquomscut and Mishquomacuk on the sea and fresh water side", and that it was near Sugar Loaf Hill. This means it was between the Pettaquamscutt (or Narrow) river to the east and the present town of Westerly to the west (the "sea side" and "fresh water side" indicating East and West respectively in that location) and to the north of Point Judith Pond (where Sugar Loaf Hill is located).

This suggests that the original Narragansett homeland was identified by 17th-century Natives as being a little island located near the northern edge of Point Judith Pond, possibly Harbor Island or one of the smaller islands there.

== Language ==
The tribe historically spoke the Narragansett language, a member of the Algonquian languages family. The Narragansetts spoke a "Y-dialect", similar enough to the "N-dialects" of the Massachusett and Wampanoag to be mutually intelligible. Other Y-dialects include the Shinnecock and Pequot languages spoken historically by tribes on Long Island and in Connecticut, respectively.

The Narragansett language became almost entirely extinct during the 20th century. The tribe has begun language revival efforts, based on early 20th-century books and manuscripts, and new teaching programs.

American English has absorbed a number of loan words from Narragansett and other closely related languages, such as Wampanoag and Massachusett. Such words include quahog, moose, papoose, powwow, squash, and succotash.

== History ==
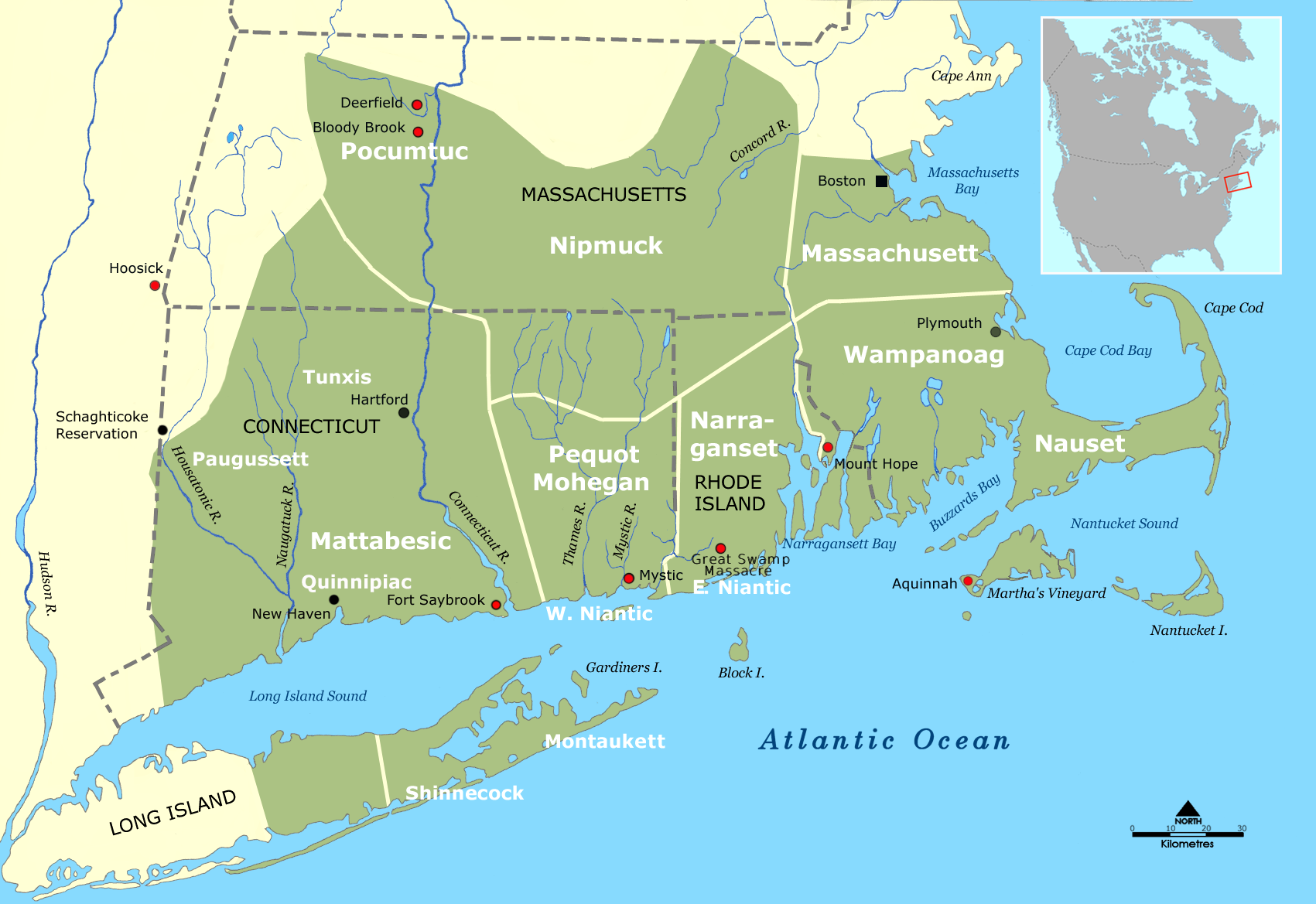
Narragansett territory in southern New England (c. 1600)

The Narragansetts were one of the leading tribes of New England, controlling the west of Narragansett Bay in Rhode Island and portions of Connecticut and eastern Massachusetts, from the Providence River on the northeast to the Pawcatuck River on the southwest. The first European contact was in 1524 when explorer Giovanni de Verrazzano visited Narragansett Bay.

Between 1616 and 1619, infectious diseases killed thousands of Algonquians in coastal areas south of Rhode Island. The Narragansetts were the most powerful tribe in the southern area of the region when the English colonists arrived in 1620, and they had not been affected by the epidemics. Chief Massasoit of the Wampanoags to the east allied with the colonists at Plymouth Colony as a way to protect the Wampanoags from Narragansett attacks. In the fall of 1621, the Narragansetts sent a sheaf of arrows wrapped in a snakeskin to Plymouth Colony as a threatening challenge, but Plymouth governor William Bradford sent the snakeskin back filled with gunpowder and bullets. The Narragansetts understood the message and did not attack them.

European settlement in the Narragansett territory did not begin until 1635; in 1636, Roger Williams acquired land from Narragansett sachems Canonicus and Miantonomi and established Providence Plantations. Williams was brought to the top of Sugarloaf Hill in nearby Wakefield when treating with the Narragansett tribe. They pointed toward this large settlement and told him that it was called Nanihigonset. This site is now believed to be the center of the Narragansett geography, where they coalesced as a tribe and began to extend their dominion over the neighboring tribes at different points in history.

=== Pequot War ===
During the Pequot War of 1637, the Narragansetts allied with the New England colonists. However, the brutality of the colonists in the Mystic massacre shocked the Narragansetts, who returned home in disgust. After the Pequots were defeated, the colonists gave captives to their allies the Narragansetts and the Mohegans.

The Narragansetts later had conflict with the Mohegans over control of the conquered Pequot land. In 1643, Miantonomi led the Narragansetts in an invasion of eastern Connecticut, where they planned to subdue the Mohegans and their leader Uncas. Miantonomi had an estimated 1,000 men under his command. The Narragansett forces fell apart, and Miantonomi was captured. The Mohegans then took Miantonomi to Hartford to turn him in for his execution, to which they were in favor but did not want blood on their hands, so they returned him to the Mohegans for his demise. While travelling back in the forests of northern Connecticut, Uncas's brother slew Miantonomi by bludgeoning him on the head with a club. The following year, Narragansett war leader Pessicus renewed the war with the Mohegans, and the number of Narragansett allies grew.

The Mohegans were on the verge of defeat when the colonists came and saved them, sending troops to defend the Mohegan fort at Shantok. The colonists then threatened to invade Narragansett territory, so Canonicus and his son Mixanno signed a peace treaty. The peace lasted for the next 30 years.

=== King Philip's War ===
Christian missionaries began to convert tribal members, and as many Indians feared that they would lose their traditions to assimilation with colonial culture, the colonists' push for religious conversion collided with Indian resistance. In 1675, John Sassamon, a converted "Praying Indian", was found bludgeoned to death in a pond. The facts were never settled concerning Sassamon's death, but historians accept that Wampanoag sachem Metacomet (known as Philip) may have ordered his execution because Sassamon cooperated with colonial authorities. Three Wampanoag men were arrested, convicted, and hanged for Sassamon's death.

Metacomet subsequently declared war on the colonists and started King Philip's War. He escaped an attempt to trap him in the Plymouth Colony, and the uprising spread throughout Massachusetts as other bands joined the fight, such as the Nipmuc. The Indians wanted to expel the colonists from New England. They waged successful attacks on settlements in Massachusetts and Connecticut, but Rhode Island was spared at the beginning, as the Narragansetts remained officially neutral.

However, the leaders of the United Colonies (Massachusetts, Plymouth, and Connecticut) accused the Narragansetts of harboring Wampanoag refugees. They made a preemptive attack on the Narragansett palisade fortress on December 19, 1675, in a battle that became known as the Great Swamp Fight. Hundreds of Narragansett non-combatants died in the attack and burning of the fort, including women and children, but nearly all of the warriors escaped. In January 1676, colonist Joshua Tefft was hanged, drawn, and quartered by colonial forces at Smith's Castle in Wickford, Rhode Island for having fought on the side of the Narragansetts during the Great Swamp Fight.

The Indians retaliated for the massacre in a widespread spring offensive beginning in February 1676, in which they destroyed all Colonial settlements on the western side of Narragansett Bay. The settlement of Providence Plantations was burned on March 27, 1676, destroying Roger Williams's house, among others. Other Indian groups destroyed many towns throughout New England, and even raided outlying settlements near Boston. However, disease, starvation, battle losses, and the lack of gunpowder caused the Indian effort to collapse by the end of March.

Troops from Connecticut, composed of colonists and their Mohegan allies, swept into Rhode Island and killed substantial numbers of the now-weakened Narragansetts. A force of Mohegans and Connecticut militia captured Narragansett sachem Canonchet a few days after the destruction of Providence Plantations, while a force of Plymouth militia and Wampanoags hunted down Metacomet. He was shot and killed, ending the war in southern New England, although it dragged on for another two years in Maine.

After the war, the colonists sold some surviving Narragansetts into slavery and shipped them to the Caribbean; others became indentured servants in Rhode Island. The surviving Narragansetts merged with local tribes, particularly the Eastern Niantics. During colonial and later times, tribe members intermarried with colonists and Africans. Their spouses and children were taken into the tribe, enabling them to keep a tribal and cultural identity.

=== 18th century ===
Ninigret, the chief sachem of the Narragansetts during King Philip's War, died soon after the war. He left four children by two wives. His eldest child, a daughter, succeeded him, and upon her death, her half-brother Ninigret succeeded her. He left a will dated 1716–17, and he died about 1722. His sons Charles Augustus and George succeeded him as sachems. George's son Thomas, commonly known as King Tom, succeeded in 1746. While King Tom was sachem, much of the Narragansett land was sold, and a considerable part of the tribe emigrated to the State of New York, joining other Indians there who belonged to the same Algonquin language group.

Nevertheless, in the 1740s during the First Great Awakening, colonists founded the Narragansett Indian Church to convert Indians to Christianity. In the ensuing years, the tribe retained control and ownership of the church and its surrounding 3 acres (12,000 m^{2}), the only land that it could keep. This continuous ownership was critical evidence of tribal continuity when the tribe applied for federal recognition in 1983.

=== 19th century ===
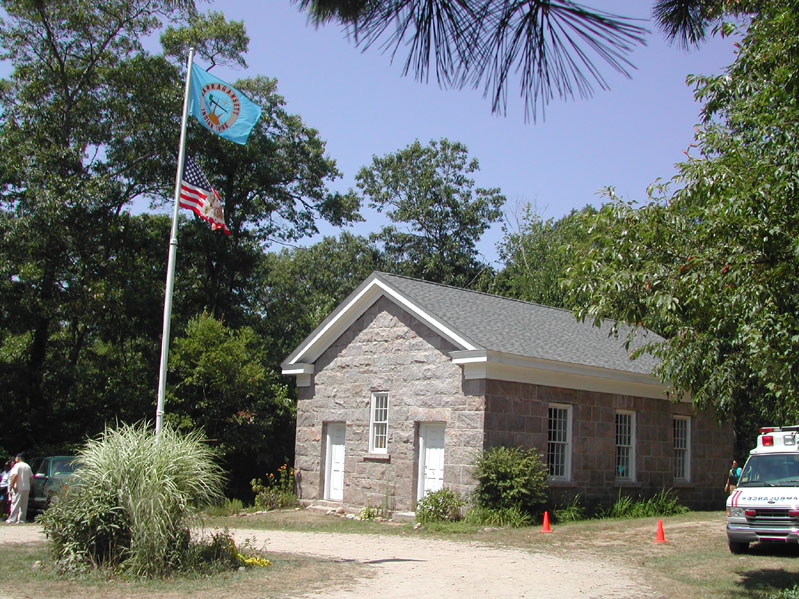
The Narragansett Indian Church in Charlestown was founded in the 1740s. This building was constructed in 1859 to replace the one that had burned down.

In the 19th century, the tribe resisted repeated state efforts to declare that it was no longer an Indian tribe because its members were multiracial in ancestry. They contended that they absorbed other ethnicities into their tribe and continued to identify culturally as Narragansetts.

The tribal leaders resisted increasing legislative pressure after the American Civil War to "take up citizenship" in the United States, which would have required them to give up their treaty privileges and Indian nation status. The Narragansetts had a vision of themselves as "a nation rather than a race", and they insisted on their rights to Indian national status and its privileges by treaty.

While testifying about this issue in a meeting with a committee of the state legislature in 1876, a Narragansett delegation said that their people saw injustices under existing US citizenship. They noted Jim Crow laws that limited the rights of Black people despite their citizenship under constitutional amendments. They also resisted suggestions that multiracial members of the tribe could not qualify as full members of the tribe. The Narragansetts had a tradition of bringing other people into their tribe by marriage and having them assimilate as culturally Narragansett, especially as their children grew up in the tribe. According to a record of their statement, they said:

We are not negroes, we are the heirs of Ninagrit, and of the great chiefs and warriors of the Narragansetts. Because, when your ancestors stole the negro from Africa and brought him amongst us and made a slave of him, we extended him the hand of friendship, and permitted his blood to be mingled with ours, are we to be called negroes? And to be told that we may be made negro citizens? We claim that while one drop of Indian blood remains in our veins, we are entitled to the rights and privileges guaranteed by your ancestors to ours by solemn treaty, which without a breach of faith you cannot violate.

From 1880 to 1884, the state persisted in its efforts at "detribalization." The tribe had agreed to negotiations for the sale of its land, but quickly regretted the decision and worked to regain the land. In 1880, the state recognized 324 Narragansett tribal members as claimants to the land during negotiations. The state put tribal lands up for public sale in the 19th century, but the tribe did not disperse, and its members continued to practice its culture.

=== 20th century ===
The Narragansetts lost control of much of their tribal lands during the state's late 19th-century detribalization, but they kept a group identity. The tribe incorporated in 1900 and built their longhouse in 1940 as a traditional place for gatherings and ceremonies.

In the late 20th century, they took action to have more control over their future. They regained 1,800 acres (730 ha) of their land in 1978, and gained federal recognition as a tribe in 1983. According to tribal rolls, there are approximately 2,400 members of the Narragansett Tribe today. Like most Americans, they have mixed ancestry, with descent from the Narragansetts and other tribes of the New England area, as well as Europeans and Africans.

==== Land claim suit ====
In January 1975, the Narragansett Tribe filed suit in federal court to regain 3,200 acres (1,300 ha) of land in southern Rhode Island, which they claimed the state had illegally taken from them in 1880. The 1880 Act authorizing the state to negotiate with the tribe listed 324 Narragansetts approved by the Supreme Court as claimants to the land.

In 1978, the Narragansett Tribe signed a Joint Memorandum of Understanding (JMOU) with the state of Rhode Island, the Town of Charlestown, and private property owners in settlement of their land claim. The state transferred a total of 1,800 acres (730 ha) to a corporation formed to hold the land in trust for descendants of the 1880 Narragansett Roll. In exchange, the tribe agreed that the laws of Rhode Island would be in effect on those lands, except for hunting and fishing. The Narragansetts had not yet been federally recognized as a tribe.

== Reservation ==
Interactive map of the Narragansett Reservation

The Narragansett Indian Tribe governs the Narragansett Indian Reservation, 1,800 acres (730 ha) of trust lands in Charlestown, Rhode Island. A small portion of the tribe resides on or near the reservation, according to the 2000 U.S. census. Additionally, they own several hundred acres in Westerly.

In 1991, the Narragansetts purchased 31 acres (13 ha) in Charlestown for the development of elderly housing. In 1998, they requested that the Department of the Interior take the property into trust on behalf of the tribe to remove it from state and local control. The case went to the United States Supreme Court, as the state challenged the removal of new lands from state oversight by a tribe recognized by the US after the 1934 Indian Reorganization Act. Rhode Island was joined in its appeal by 21 other states.

In 2009, the US Supreme Court ruled that the Department of the Interior could not take land into trust, removing it from state control, if a tribe had achieved federal recognition after the 1934 Indian Reorganization Act, and if the land in question was acquired after that federal recognition. Their determination was based on wording in the act which defines "Indian" as "all persons of Indian descent who are members of any recognized tribe now under federal jurisdiction."

== Government ==
The tribe is led by a chief sachem and an elected tribal council. The entire tribal population must approve major decisions. An election for several officers, including a new assistant tribal secretary, was scheduled for April 5, 2025.

The administration in March 2025 was:

- Chief Sachem: Anthony Dean Stanton (Crawling Wolf)
- 1st Councilman: Cassius Spears Jr.
- 2nd Councilman: Mike Monroe Sr.
- Councilman: John Pompey
- Councilman: Lonny Brown, Sr.
- Councilwoman: Yvonne Lamphere
- Councilman: Keith Sampson
- Councilwoman: Heather Angel Mars-Martins
- Councilman: John Mahoney
- Councilman: Raymond Lamphere
- Tribal Secretary: Monica Stanton
- Assistant Tribal Secretary: Betty Johnson
- Tribal Treasurer: Mary S. Brown
- Assistant Tribal Treasurer: vacant
- Medicine Man: John Brown
- War Chief: John N. Thomas (Mosqua)
- Medicine Woman: Wenonah Harris
- Tribal Nurse: Alberta Wilcox

=== Enrollment ===
The tribe prepared extensive documentation of its genealogy and proof of continuity as descendants of the 324 tribal citizens of treaty status. In 1979, the tribe applied for federal recognition, which it finally regained in 1983 as the Narragansett Indian Tribe of Rhode Island (the official name used by the Bureau of Indian Affairs).

The tribe has plans to upgrade the Longhouse that it constructed along RI Route 2 (South County Trail) to serve as a place of American Indian cuisine and cultural meeting house. These plans have been in the works for more than 15 years. The Longhouse was built in 1940 and has fallen into disrepair. Upgrades are also being planned for the Narragansett tribal medical, technological, and artistic systems.

The Narragansetts have undertaken efforts to review tribal rolls and reassess applications for enrollment, like numerous other tribes in the 21st century. They currently require tribal citizens to show direct descent from one or more of the 324 citizens listed on the 1880-84 Roll, which was established when Rhode Island negotiated land sales.

Tribal enrollment is 4,000, and the tribe has closed its rolls. They have dropped some people from the rolls and denied new applications for membership. Scholars and activists see this as a national trend among tribes, prompted by a variety of factors, including internal family rivalries and the issue of significant new revenues from Indian casinos. Many of the removed would later form and join the unrecognized Northern Narragansett Tribe.

== Economic development ==
The Narragansett Tribe is negotiating with the General Assembly for approval to build a casino in Rhode Island with their partner, currently Harrah's Entertainment. The Rhode Island Constitution declares illegal all non-state-run lotteries or gambling. A proposed constitutional amendment to allow the tribe to build the casino was voted down by state residents in November 2006.

== Culture ==
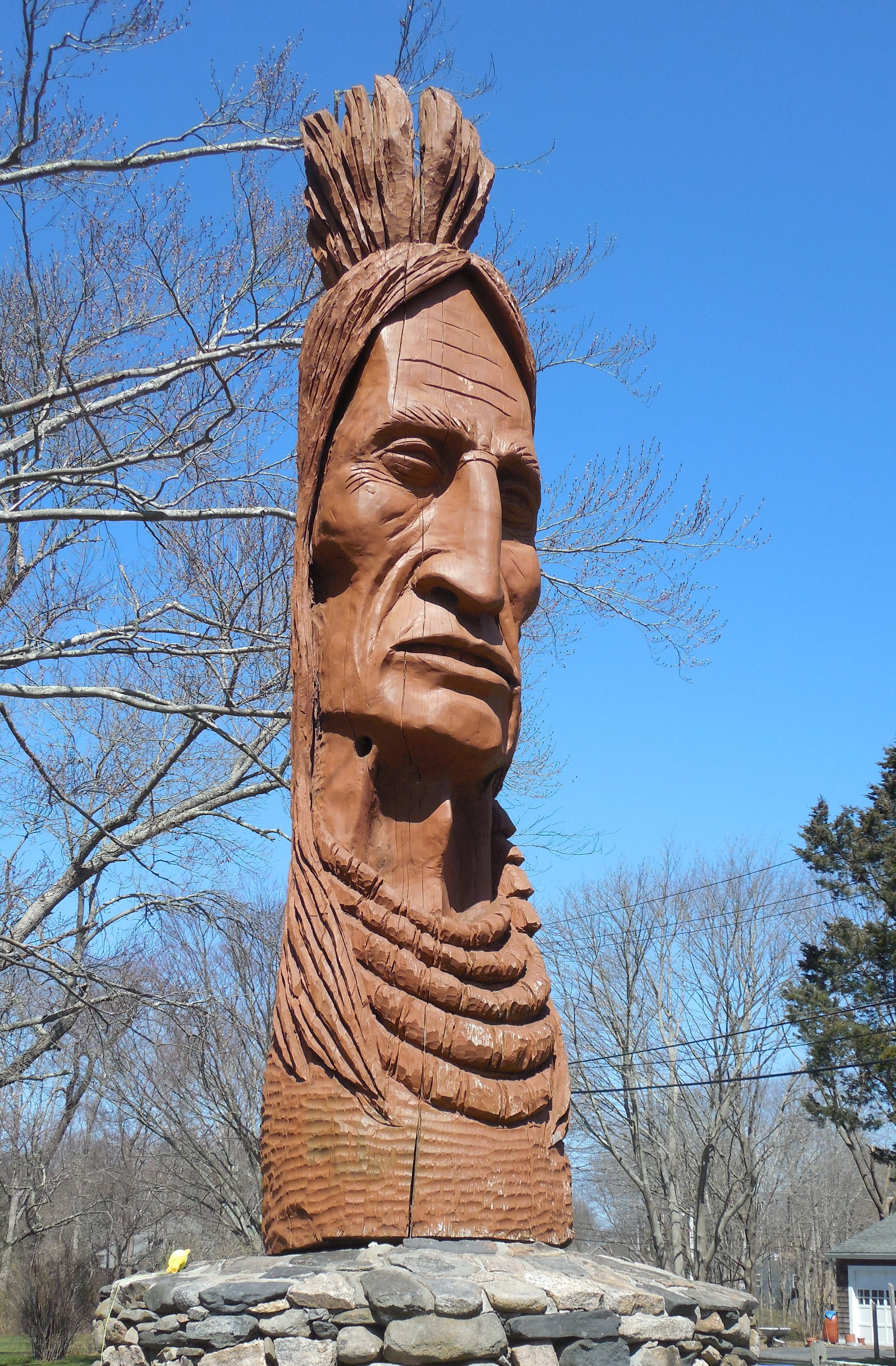
20 ft (6.1 m) high sculpture of Enishkeetompauog Narragansett in Sprague Park, Narragansett, Rhode Island, dedicated in 1982

The tribe hosts their annual meeting powwow on the second weekend of August on their reservation in Charlestown, Rhode Island. It is a gathering of thanksgiving and honor to the Narragansett people and is the oldest recorded powwow in North America, dating back to 1675's colonial documentation of the gathering (the powwow had been held long before European contact).

In August 2017, the tribe held the 342nd powwow with events including the traditional grand entry, a procession of military veterans, dancers, and honored tribal representatives, and the ceremonial lighting of a sacred fire. There was also a church service, food vendors, and arts and crafts.

Due to intermarriage between Black and Narragansett people, many citizens of the Narragansett Indian Tribe have African ancestry. Others intermarried with whites or have a mix of white, Black, and American Indian ancestry.

== Legal issues ==
The US Supreme Court agreed to hear Carcieri v. Salazar (2009) in the fall of 2008, a case determining American Indian land rights. The Court ruled in favor of Rhode Island in February 2009. The suit was brought by the state of Rhode Island against the Department of the Interior (DOI) over its authority to take land into trust on behalf of certain American Indians. The authority was part of the 1934 Indian Reorganization Act, but the state argued that the process could not hold for tribes that achieved federal recognition after 1934. The US Supreme Court upheld the state based on language in the act. At issue is 31 acres (130,000 m^{2}) of land in Charlestown, which the Narragansetts purchased in 1991. The Narragansetts requested the DOI to take it into trust on their behalf in order to remove it from state and local control, after trying to develop it for elderly housing under state regulations in 1998.

The state and tribe have disagreed on certain rights on the reservation. On July 14, 2003, Rhode Island state police raided a tribe-run smoke shop on the Charlestown reservation, the culmination of a dispute over the tribe's failure to pay state taxes on its sale of cigarettes. In 2005, the U.S. First Circuit Court of Appeals declared the police action a violation of the tribe's sovereignty. In 2006, an en banc decision of the First Circuit Court of Appeals reversed the prior decision, stating that the raid did not violate the tribe's sovereign immunity because of the 1978 Joint Memorandum of Agreement settling the land issues, in which the tribe agreed that state law would be observed on its land.

In a separate federal civil rights lawsuit, the tribe charged the police with the use of excessive force during the 2003 raid on the smoke shop. One Narragansett man suffered a broken leg in the confrontation. The case was being retried in the summer of 2008. Competing police experts testified on each side of the case.

== Notable Narragansetts ==
=== Historical Narragansett people ===
- Canonicus, sachem 1600s–1636 and 1643–1644, grandson or son of Wessoum
- George Fayerweather (1802–1869), blacksmith in Kingston, Rhode Island of Narragansett-African descent who was host to anti-slavery activists; his wife Sarah Harris Fayerweather was particularly active in the movement
- Miantonomo, sachem 1636–1643, nephew of Canonicus
- Pessicus, sachem 1644–1647, brother of Miantonomo
- Canonchet, sachem 1657–1676, son of Miantonomo, cousin of Mriksah
- Ninigret sachem 1676–ca. 1682 during King Philip's War

=== 20th and 21st century Narragansett people ===
- Ellison "Tarzan" Brown (1913–1975), two-time Boston Marathon winner (1936, 1939) and 1936 U.S. Olympian
- Mary E. Congdon, also Princess Red Wing (1896–1987), historian, museum curator, and sachem of the New England Council of Chiefs
- Sonny Dove (1945–1983), basketball player
- Robyn E. Hannigan, scientist whose mother was from the Narragansett nation and who is currently provost at Clarkson University
- John Christian Hopkins (born 1960), journalist and published author
- Rev. Harold Mars (1911–1989), preacher and prophet
- Nancy Elizabeth Prophet (1890–1960), sculptor of African-Narragansett descent
- Ella Sekatau (1928–2014), poet, historian, Ethnohistorian and Medicine Woman
- Loren Spears, educator, writer, director of the Tomaquag Museum
- Russell Spears (1917–2009), stonemason

== See also ==
- Cautantowwit
- Great Salt Pond Archeological District
- Historic Village of the Narragansetts in Charlestown
- Indian Burial Ground
- List of early settlers of Rhode Island
- The Narragansett Dawn, a Narragansett newspaper from the 1930s
- Native American tribes in Massachusetts
