= Pomperaug Trail =

Hiking trail in Connecticut, United States

Trail
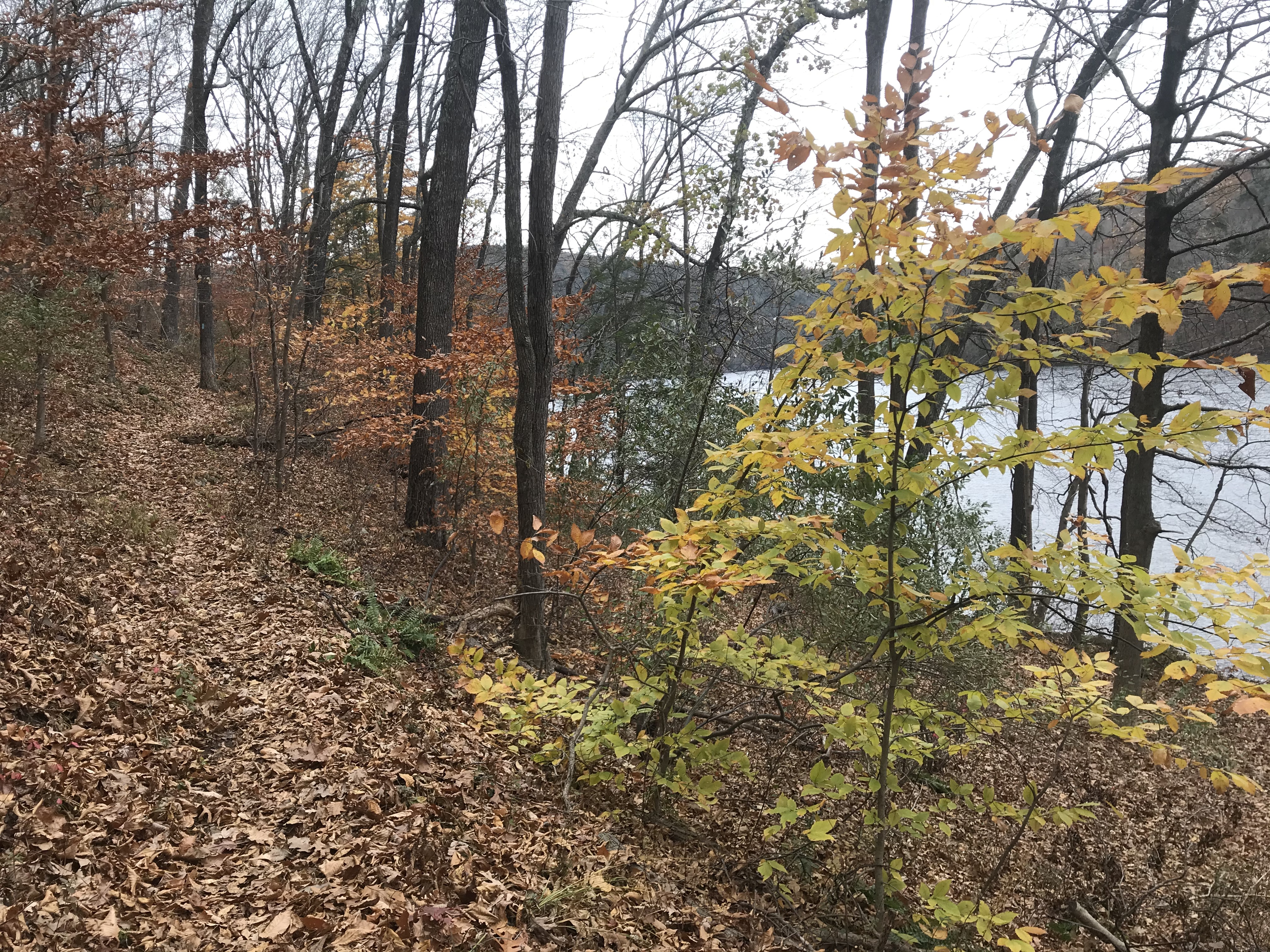
- View from Kettletown State Park's Crest Trail of the Housatonic River's Lake Zoar.
- Length: 4.6 mi (7.4 km)
- Location: Oxford, Connecticut, USA
- Designation: CFPA Blue-Blazed Trail
- Use: hiking, cross-country skiing, snowshoeing, other
- Lowest point: Connecticut Route 34, Lake Zoar and Stevenson Dam (41.38°N 73.16°W), 59 ft (18 m)
- Difficulty: easy, with very few difficult sections
- Season: easiest spring to fall
- Hazards: hunters, deer ticks, poison ivy

The Kettletown Trails are a 4.6-mile (7.4 km) Blue-Blazed hiking trail "system" in the lower Housatonic River valley in Fairfield County. They are in the towns of Southbury and Oxford—primarily in the Kettletown State Park and the Jackson Cove recreation area belonging to the town of Oxford.

The Pomperaug "Blue-Blazed" linear trail is an in-land trail from near the northern main entrance to the park in Southbury traveling along the inland border of the Kettletown State Park to and south of the Oxford Jackson Cove beach recreation area. The Pomperaug trail connects to another trail which provides a path which crosses the Housatonic/Lake Zoar at the Stevenson Dam to the south and then north to Paugussett State Forest on the western shore of Lake Zoar (the section of the Housatonic River between the Stevenson Dam to the south and the Shepaug Dam to the north).

The Crest "Blue-Blazed" linear trail is a coastal trail which aligned with the eastern shore of Lake Zoar through Kettletown State Park from north of the Jackson Cove recreation area up to the northern main entrance to the park in Southbury. The Pomperaug and Crest trails can be used together as a "loop" trail.

There are shorter side trails in the park which have rectangular blue blazes with red, white, orange or yellow squares on their bottom border.

The Campground side trail connects the Lake Zoar shore campground section of Kettletown State Park with the Pomperaug trail.

The Miller trail is a 1+ mile loop trail around the northern boundary of Kettletown State Park with scenic overlooks of Lake Zoar.

Notable features include a few steep climbs and semi-obscured scenic views of Lake Zoar (Housatonic River). The Kettletown trails system is maintained largely through the efforts of the Connecticut Forest and Park Association.

The Pomperaug Trail is approximately one mile north of the Stevenson Dam. It is possible to walk from the Pomperaug Trail to the Paugussett and Zoar Trails.

== Trail description ==
The Pomperaug Trail extends from its southern terminus at the end of Great Quarter Road in Paugussett State Forest in Newtown, then follows a route northwest along the western bank of the Housatonic River until, at the northernmost point, it turns south-east and proceeds roughly south-east back to the terminus at the end of Great Quarter Road.

The Pomperaug Trail is primarily used for hiking, backpacking, picnicking, and in the winter, snowshoeing. Portions of the trail are suitable for, and are used for, geocaching, mountain biking and cross-country skiing. Site-specific activities enjoyed along the route include hunting (very limited), fishing, horseback riding, bouldering and rock climbing (access).

=== Trail route ===
The Pomperaug Trail loop in Southbury and Oxford primarily parallels the Housatonic River on the high western bank and ridge running south to north.

The Pomperaug Trail traverses several high points with scenic views of the Housatonic River though they may be obscured by foliage, particularly in the summer. The trail also travels very close to the eastern bank of the river (Lake Zoar) in some locations.

Several year-round and seasonal streams cut across the trail to flow into the Housatonic River.

By adding reasonably short road walks the Pomperaug Trail is considered part of the larger Lake Zoar Blue-Blazed Trails which span both the west and east banks of Lake Zoar. The Pomperaug Trail is connected to the Kettletown State Park trails.

Zoar Trail in lower Paugussett State Forest can be reached via a road walk by following Fiddlehead Road to Freeman Road to Copper Mine Road and then taking Connecticut Route 34 west over the Stevenson Dam, then following to Great Quarter Road (just over the Newtown border).

=== Trail communities ===
The Blue-Blazed Pomperaug Trail is entirely within the towns of Oxford and Southbury, Connecticut.

== History and folklore ==
=== Origin and name ===
Pomperaug was the name of the Pootatuck Native American "Chieftain" from whom much of the land in eastern Fairfield County was purchased by the original European settlers.

Woodbury was once known as Pomperoug.

== Historic sites ==
Lake Zoar was created in 1919 by the construction of the Stevenson Dam to produce hydro-electric power and to provide a Housatonic River vehicle crossing.

Lake Housatonic is the Housatonic River section south of the Stevenson Dam which parallels the Paugussett Trail which was created by the construction of the Derby Dam (now known as the Lake Housatonic Dam) in October 1870 to provide a river crossing as well as water for nearby industry.

Lake Lillinonah is the section of the Housatonic north of Lake Zoar. It was created in 1955 by damming the Housatonic River via the construction of the Shepaug Dam (more precisely called the Shepaug Hydro-Electronic Project, there are two Shepaug Dams—the other one is on the Shepaug River and is owned by the City of Waterbury, Connecticut ) to produce hydro-electric power. The man-made lake was prematurely and accidentally flooded by Hurricane Diane on August 19, 1955 a few weeks before the dam was scheduled to commence operation. The lake was drained and refilled again beginning on September 27, 1955 by closing the gates on the new dam.

In 1985 Shepaug Dam owners opened a free public observation site in Southbury, Connecticut near the hydroelectric generation plant for viewing Lake Lillinonah's Bald Eagles (and other predatory bird species such as hawks). Reservations are required and the season is limited to the last weekend in December until March 17 on Wednesdays, Saturdays and Sundays from 9 a.m. until 1 p.m.

There are also eagles, hawks and other predatory birds which nest along Lake Zoar.

=== Folklore ===
The location of the village occupied by the Pootatuck Indians in the Lake Zoar area is said to have been flooded by the damming of the Housatonic River and the creation of Lake Zoar.

The Pootatuck (often spelled Pohtatuck in colonial era documents and related to the name Potatuck) were a branch of the Paugussett tribe who lived in Woodbury, Southbury and Newtown.

The European settlers found Pootatuck Native Americans living along the Housatonic and Pootatuck Rivers near the Sandy Hook area of Newtown, Connecticut (an area which was called "Pohtatuck" before the name was changed to "Sandy Hook"). Newtown, known as Quanneapague, was purchased from the Pohtatuck in 1705 and incorporated as a town in 1711. Most of the original settlers were farmers from Stratford and Milford, Connecticut.

The Paugussett were an Algonquian-speaking Native American tribe and sachemdom existing in southwestern Connecticut in the 17th century.

Paugussett villages existed throughout southwestern Connecticut in Bridgeport, Trumbull, Stratford, Shelton, Monroe and Oxford in Fairfield County as well as in what is now Milford, Orange, Woodbridge, Beacon Falls, Derby and Naugatuck in New Haven County, Connecticut. Derby Connecticut was once known as "Paugussett" before it was renamed in 1675.

While the Pootatuck branch has largely vanished, descendants of the southeast Fairfield County Connecticut branch of the Paugussett tribe (known as the "Golden Hill" Paugussetts) today have a reservation in Colchester Connecticut (New London County) as well as a small land holding in the Nichols section of Stratford, Connecticut.

== Hiking the trail ==
The mainline Pomperaug trail is blazed with blue rectangles. It is regularly maintained, and is considered easy hiking, with very few sections of rugged and moderately difficult hiking.

Much of the Pomperaug Trail is close to public roads. There are some camping facilities in lower Kettletown State Park along the trail which must be reserved and camping is prohibited in the municipal. Trail descriptions are available from a number of commercial and non-commercial sources, and a complete guidebook is published by the Connecticut Forest and Park Association

Weather along the route is typical of Connecticut. Conditions on exposed ridge tops and summits may be harsher during cold or stormy weather. Lightning is a hazard on exposed summits and ledges during thunderstorms. Snow is common in the winter and may necessitate the use of snowshoes. Ice can form on exposed ledges and summits, making hiking dangerous without special equipment.

Extensive flooding in ponds, puddles and streams may occur in the late winter or early spring, overflowing into the trail and causing very muddy conditions. In this case fairly high waterproof boots are recommended. Some parts of the trail follow forest roads which often contain ruts from ATVs and four-wheel drive vehicles.

Biting insects can be bothersome during warm weather. Parasitic deer ticks (which are known to carry Lyme disease) are a potential hazard. The trail heads and parking are close to residential areas.

A very small part of the trail is adjacent to, or is on lands where hunting and the use of firearms are permitted. Wearing bright orange clothing during the hunting season (Fall through December) is recommended.

== See also ==
- Blue-Blazed Trails
- Oxford
- Southbury
