= Naugatuck (disambiguation) =

Naugatuck may refer to:

== Connecticut, U.S. ==
- Naugatuck, Connecticut
  - Naugatuck River
    - Naugatuck River Valley
  - Naugatuck Trail
  - Naugatuck Railroad
  - Naugatuck State Forest
  - Naugatuck High School
  - Naugatuck (Metro-North station)

== West Virginia, U.S. ==
- Naugatuck, West Virginia

== Ships ==
- USRC Naugatuck, a steamer owned by the US Revenue Cutter Service during the American Civil War
- USS Naugatuck, the name of several ships
- SS Tarpon (shipwreck), originally known as the Naugatuck

== Other uses ==
- Mrs. Nell Naugatuck, character in Maude (TV series)
