= Naugatuck State Forest =

State forest in Connecticut, U.S.

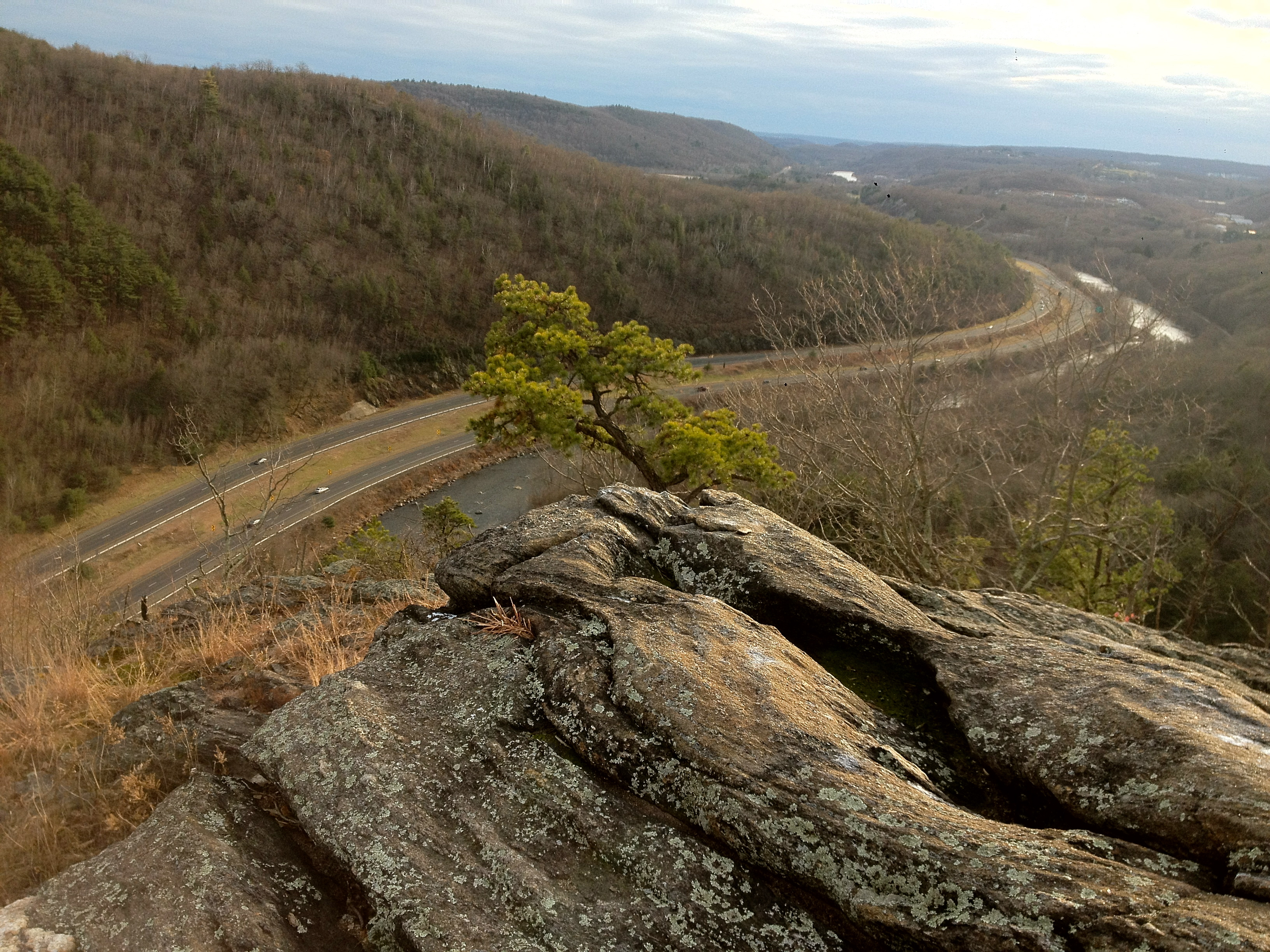

- Location within Connecticut Location within the United States
- Location: New Haven County, Connecticut, United States
- Coordinates: 41°27′29″N 73°00′53″W
- Area: 4,153 acres (1,681 ha)
- Elevation: 748 ft (228 m)
- Established: 1931
- Administrator: Connecticut Department of Energy and Environmental Protection
- Website: Naugatuck State Forest

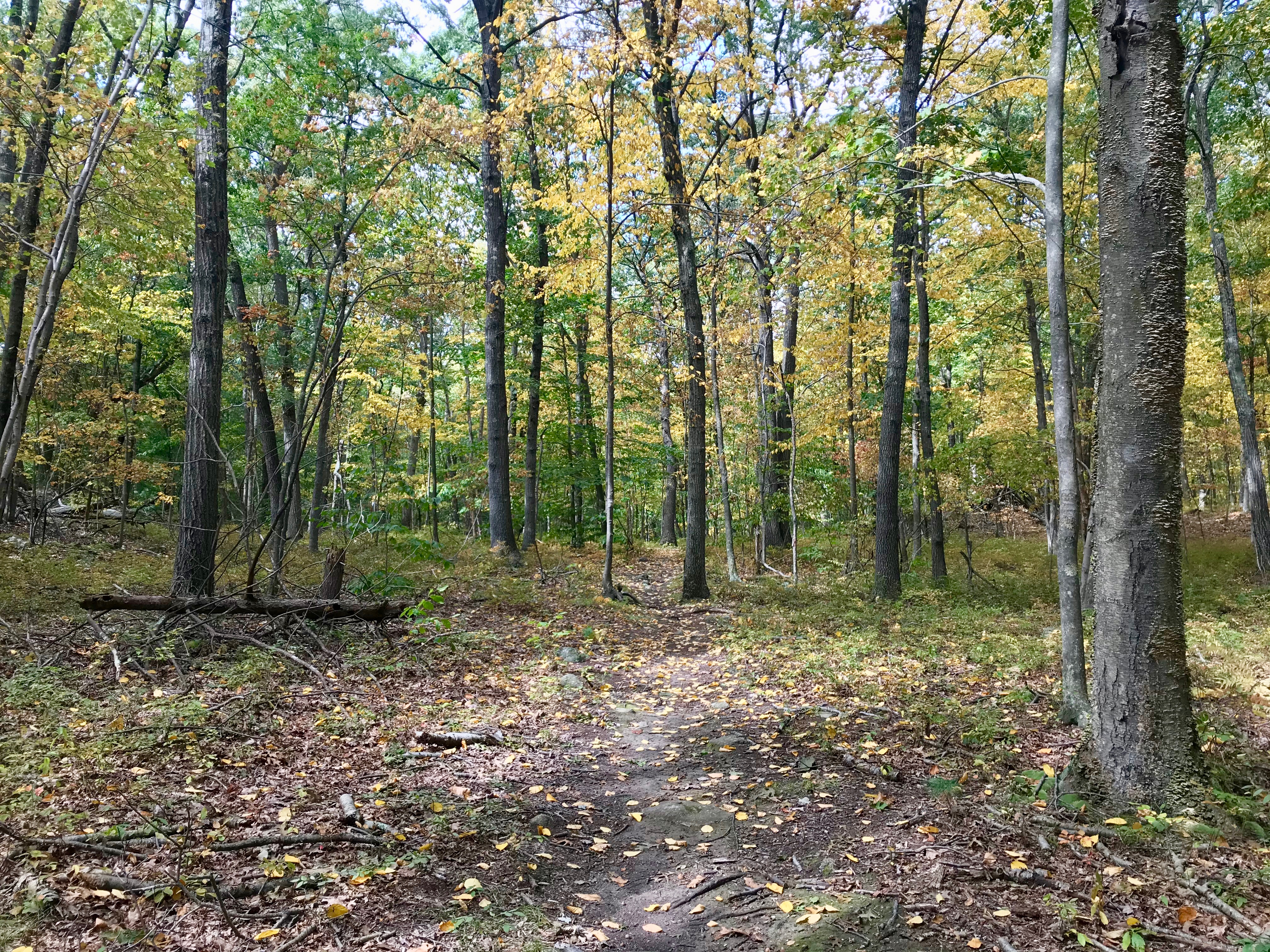
Early fall leaves on Quillinan's White Trail "singletrack" near the former NIKE missile site in Ansonia, Connecticut, between Moulthrap Brook, Twomile Brook and Osborne Lane.

Naugatuck State Forest is a Connecticut state forest consisting of five separate blocks in the towns of Oxford, Beacon Falls, Naugatuck, Bethany, Cheshire, Hamden, Seymour, and Ansonia. The five blocks are the Mount Sanford (Cheshire, Hamden—bordering Prospect and Bethany), East (Beacon Falls, Bethany, Naugatuck), West (Naugatuck, Oxford, Beacon Falls), Quillinan Reservoir (Seymour, Ansonia), and Great Hill (Seymour) blocks.

== History ==
The first purchases of lands which comprise the Naugatuck State Forest were made by Harris Whittemore in 1921. Whittemore, a Connecticut State Forest and Park Commissioner and industrial magnate, intended to donate the forest parcels to the state but died in 1928 before he could do so. In 1931, in memoriam, Whittemore's family donated nearly 2,000 acres (which included additional parcels acquired after his death). The other blocks were added afterwards with the Great Hill block having been added most recently.

A scenic valley consisting of the parallel Naugatuck River and Connecticut Route 8 splits the East and West block's rising hills in Naugatuck. Most of the Naugatuck State Forest blocks are in the Naugatuck River watershed whose sources and mouth are entirely within the limits of Connecticut and which is itself a tributary of the lower Housatonic River. The towns in the Naugatuck Valley area were settled during the early part of the 18th century and were typical of the early New England settlements. Rivers, streams and ponds were dammed to furnish waterpower for gristmills, tanneries, and later paper mills. There are many stone walls marking the boundaries of colonial era farms, though large portions of the Naugatuck State Forest blocks are composed of rocky hills which made poor farmland.

== Activities ==
Naugatuck State Forest is used for fishing, hiking, hunting, target shooting, snowmobiling, cross country skiing, mountain biking, climbing, geocaching and trail running. The forest is crossed by several Blue-Blazed Trails including the Quinnipiac Trail and Naugatuck Trail (including the Whittemore spur). Mountain biking trails include fire roads in the various blocks, as well as several miles of singletrack trail in the Quillinan Block that were created in cooperation of the DEEP State Forester's office, the New England Mountain Bike Association (NEMBA), and Thule Corporation.

== Features ==
- Eastern East Block - Beacon Cap
- West Block - High Rock Shooting Association Rifle Range
- West Block - Seymour Reservoirs
- Mount Sanford block - Cromie Grove and the border with the Town of Hamden's Brooksvale Recreation Area/Park.
- Quillinan Block - Mountain biking "singletrack" White and Purple trails.
