= Indian Well State Park =

State park in Fairfield County, Connecticut

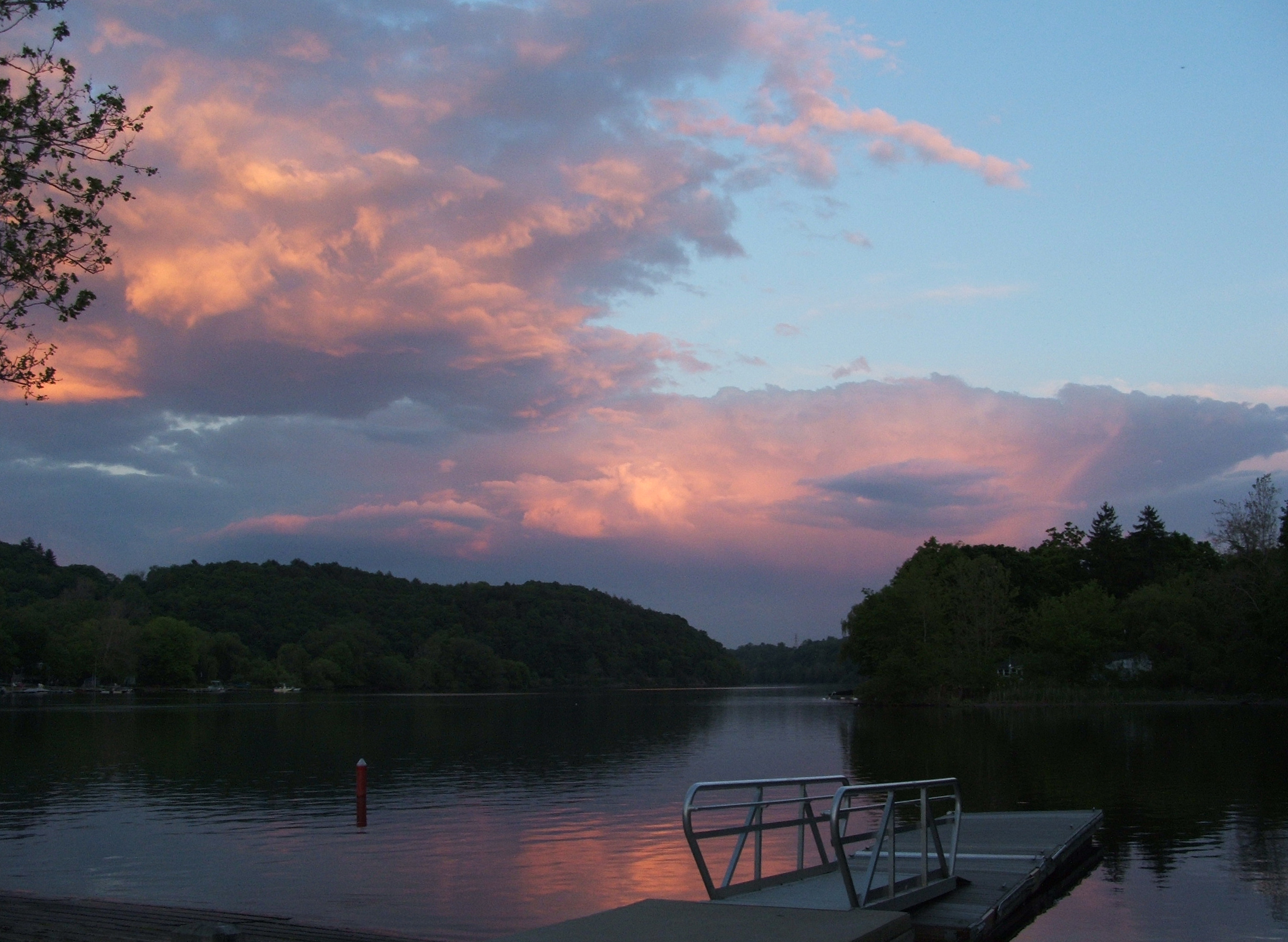
- The park's boat launch at sunset

- Location within Connecticut Location within the United States
- Location: Shelton, Connecticut, United States
- Coordinates: 41°20′20″N 73°07′28″W
- Area: 153 acres (62 ha)
- Elevation: 43 ft (13 m)
- Established: 1928
- Administrator: Connecticut Department of Energy and Environmental Protection
- Designation: Connecticut state park
- Website: Official website

Indian Well State Park is a public recreation area occupying 153 acres (62 ha) on the west bank of Lake Housatonic, an impoundment of the Housatonic River, within the city limits of Shelton, Connecticut. The state park's scenic features include a 15-foot (4.6 m) horsetail waterfalls with splash pool at bottom. The park is managed by the Connecticut Department of Energy and Environmental Protection.

== History ==
The park was created in 1928 when the State Park and Forest Commission purchased 150 acres which included nearly two miles of riverfront from the Ousatonic Water Power Company. Beginning in the 1990s, the park became the scene of annual regattas hosted by the New Haven Rowing Club.

== Activities and amenities ==
The park is traversed from north to south by the blue-blazed Paugussett Trail. A boat launch provides access to Lake Housatonic, which is a state Bass Management Lake with smallmouth and largemouth bass, white catfish, white perch, yellow perch, American eel, sunfish, and carp. The park also offers lifeguard-supervised swimming and picnicking facilities.
