= Kettletown State Park =

State park in New Haven County, Connecticut

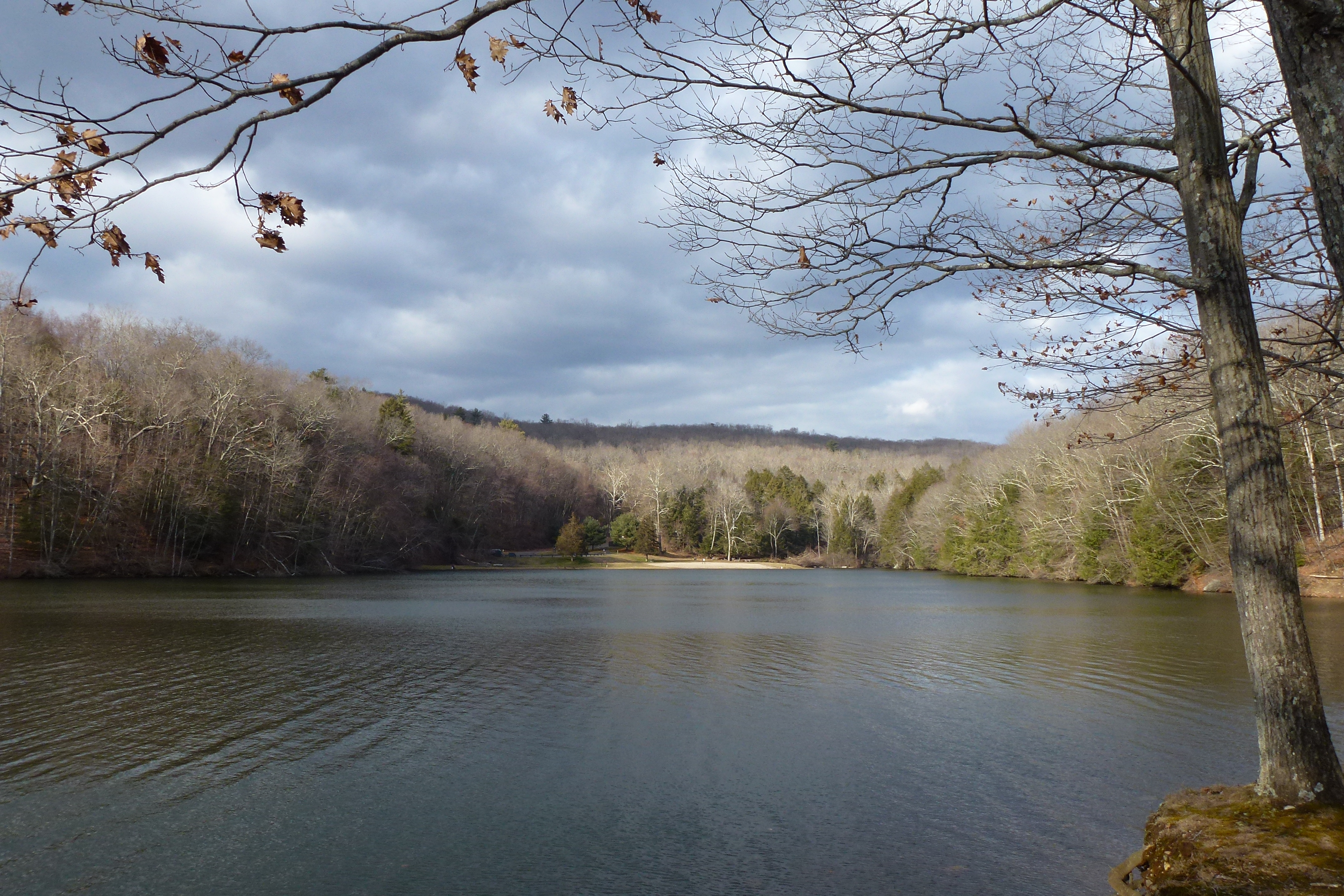
- Lake Zoar

- Location within Connecticut Location within the United States
- Location: Oxford and Southbury, Connecticut, United States
- Coordinates: 41°25′29″N 73°12′22″W
- Area: 605 acres (245 ha)
- Elevation: 98 ft (30 m)
- Established: 1950
- Administrator: Connecticut Department of Energy and Environmental Protection
- Designation: Connecticut state park
- Website: Official website

Kettletown State Park is a public recreation area on the eastern shore of the Housatonic River's Lake Zoar in the towns of Oxford and Southbury, Connecticut. Park activities include camping, hiking, picnicking, and fishing. The state park is managed by the Connecticut Department of Energy and Environmental Protection.
