= Paugussett Trail =

Hiking trail in Connecticut, United States

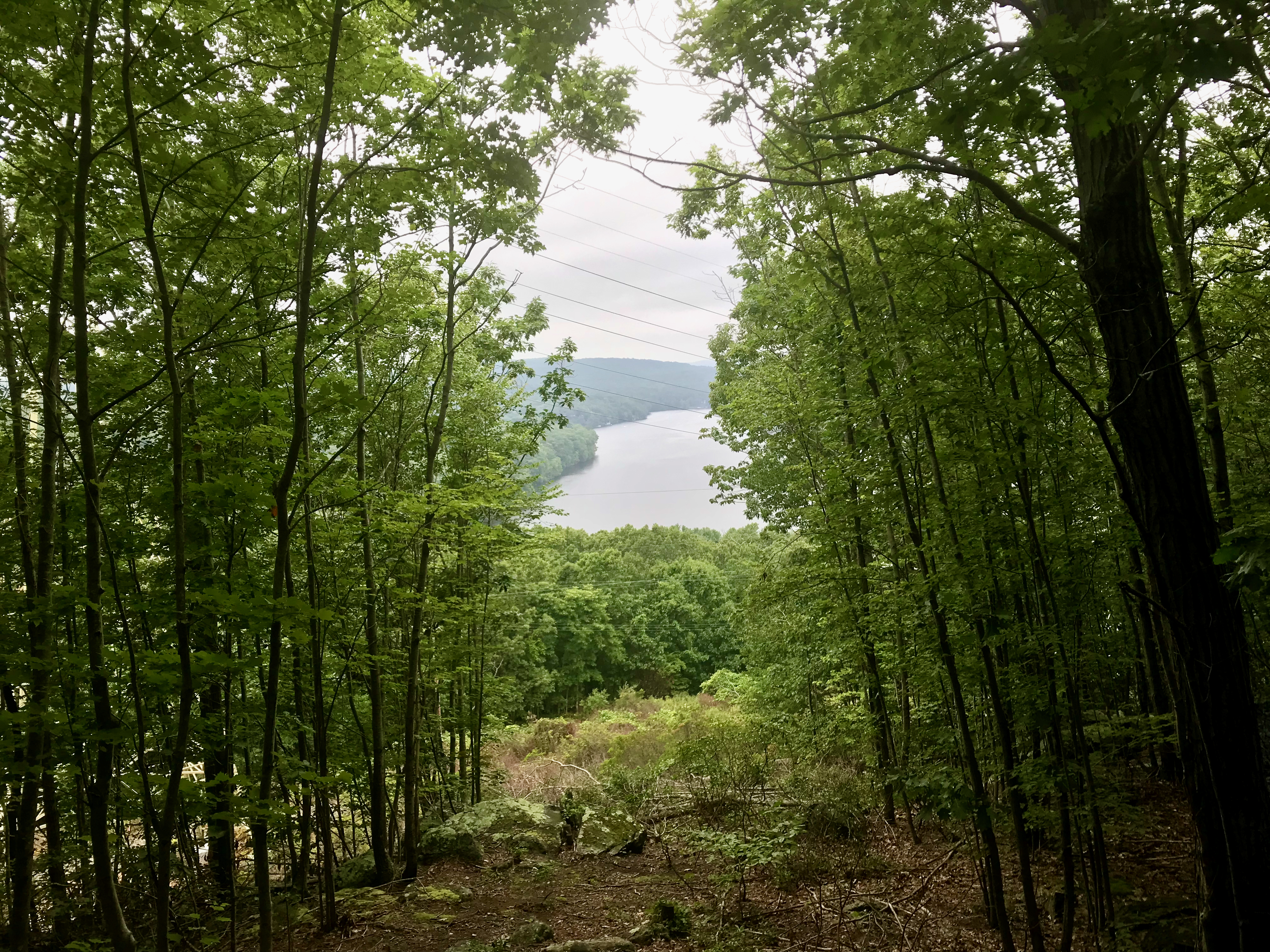
- The Paugussett Trail's scenic view of the Monroe, Connecticut shore of Lake Zoar.
- Length: 14 mi (23 km)
- Location: Monroe / Shelton, Connecticut, USA
- Designation: CFPA Blue-Blazed Paugussett Trail
- Use: hiking, cross-country skiing, snowshoeing, other
- Highest point: Webb Mountain Park, 417 ft (127 m)
- Lowest point: Connecticut Route 34, Lake Zoar and Stevenson Dam (41.38°N 73.16°W), 59 ft (18 m)
- Difficulty: easy, with very few difficult sections
- Season: easiest spring to fall
- Hazards: hunters, deer ticks, poison ivy

The Paugussett Trail is a 14-mile (23 km) Blue-Blazed hiking trail "system" in the lower Housatonic River valley in Fairfield County and, today, is entirely in Shelton and Monroe, Connecticut. Much of the trail is in Indian Well State Park and the Town of Monroe's Webb Mountain Park. The mainline (official "Blue-Blazed") trail is primarily southeast to northwest with three short side or spur trails.

The Paugussett Trail today is composed of four trails of which one is the upside-down V-shaped Southeast-to-North-to-SouthWest mainline trail (13.3 miles) plus three shorter side or access spur trails. The northernmost point on the trail is at Connecticut Route 34 and Lake Zoar's southern shore.

Notable features include the initial steep climb near the Indian Well waterfall, a steep climb with stairs at Princess Wenonah Drive and semi-obscured scenic views of the Housatonic River. The Paugussett Trail is maintained largely through the efforts of the Connecticut Forest and Park Association.

The Paugussett Trail was a much larger trail in the 1930s and 1940s but it has been one of the Blue-Blazed Trails most drastically shrunk by post-World War 2 housing developments.

== Trail description ==
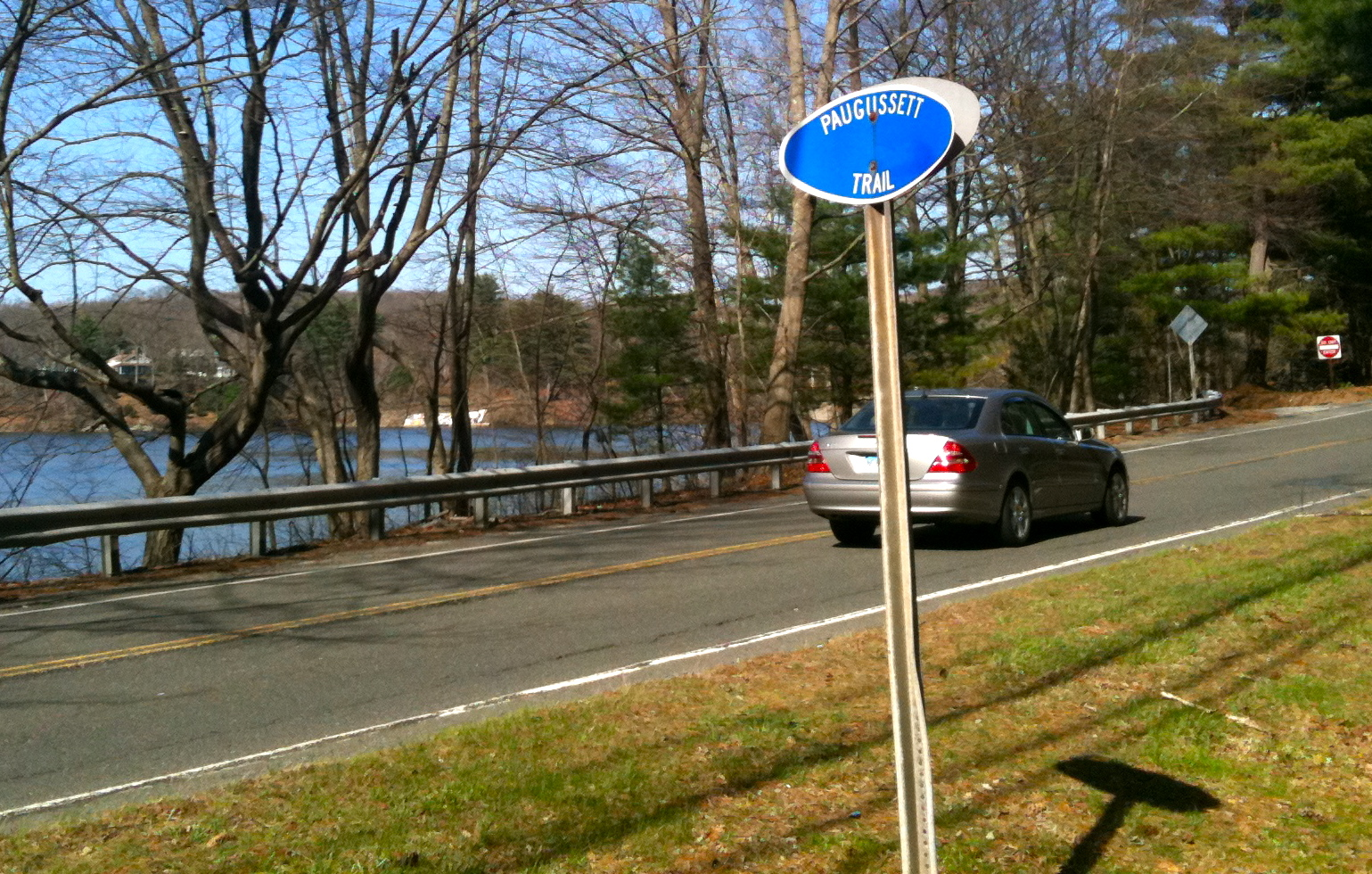
Paugussett Trail access spur sign at Connecticut Route 34 on Lake Zoar, Monroe, Connecticut.

The Paugussett Trail extends from its southern terminus at Buddington Road in Shelton, and travels north through the Shelton Lakes Greenway, Indian Well State Park, and Birchbank Mountain Open Space, then enters the Town of Monroe at Webb Mountain Park, and turns southwest to follow the Boys Halfway River. The northern terminus is on East Village Road near its intersection with Barn Hill Road in the East Village section of Monroe. Today's Paugussett Trail passes through just the municipalities of Shelton and Monroe—both in Fairfield County.

The Paugussett Trail is primarily used for hiking, backpacking, picnicking, and in the winter, snowshoeing. Portions of the trail are suitable for, and are used for, geocaching, mountain biking and cross-country skiing. Site-specific activities enjoyed along the route include hunting (very limited), fishing, horseback riding, bouldering and rock climbing (access). There are signs at the Connecticut Indian Well State Park Paugussett trail head forbidding rock climbing near the Indian Well waterfall.

=== Trail route ===
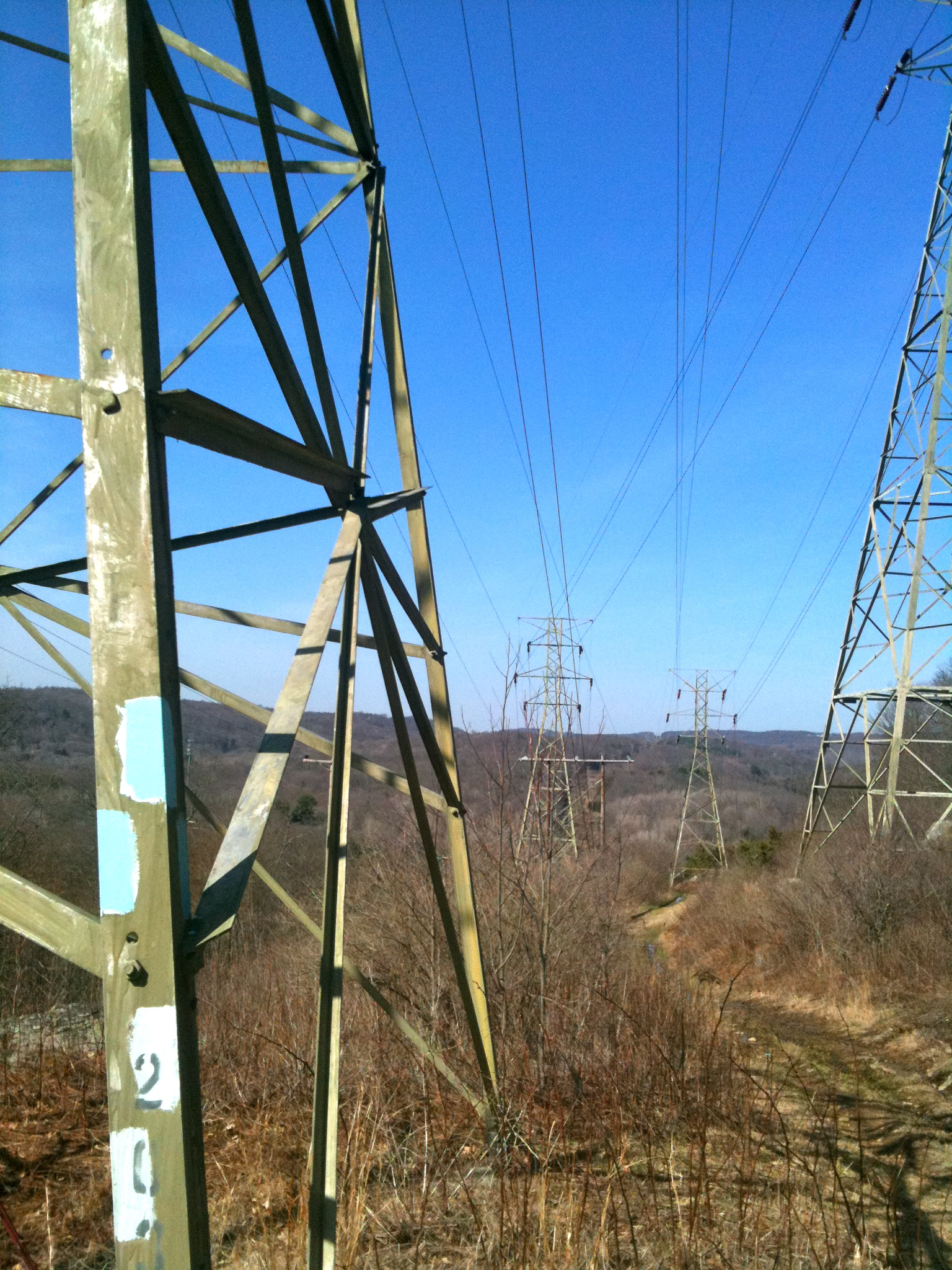
Paugussett Trail crossing power line cut north of Webb Mountain Park in Monroe, Connecticut.

The trail begins on Buddington Road and travels north through the Shelton Lakes Greenway, passing through Eklund Garden and following the shores of Hope Lake and Silent Waters. There is an extensive trail network at Shelton Lakes. The trail then continues north on open space land owned by the City of Shelton, passing hayfields to arrive at Meadow Street, where the trail begins a long, gradual descent towards the Housatonic River.

The trail crosses Route 110 (Leavenworth Road) and soon arrives at a parking area for the Falls at Indian Well State Park. This marks the former southern terminus of the trail. An unmarked but well-traveled side trail, locally called the "Well Trail," leads from the parking area to the legendary falls on Indian Hole Brook. The Paugussett Trail crosses the brook and gradually climbs about 350 feet to the top of the riverbank, where there is a short spur trail leading to an overlook of the Housatonic River.

The main trail then begins following the riverbank, passing a white-blazed access trail leading up from the Indian Well beach, and continuing for about two miles through sometimes difficult terrain before reaching another overlook of the Housatonic River at the Birchbank Mountain Open Space. The trail then descends gradually, passing over an old charcoal mound and crossing Upper White Hills Brook at the side of the former Monroe Rod and Gun Club, where a chimney stands. There's a brief road walk beginning on Round Hill Road, then the trail rises steeply between houses to enter Shelton Land Trust property. This section of trail is known as the Poet Path. After another brief road walk on Thoreau Drive, the trail drops steeply to Round Hill Brook, which marks the Shelton/Monroe border and the beginning of Webb Mountain Park.

Camping is available at Webb Mountain through the Town of Monroe. After passing through Webb Mountain, the trail continues to roughly follow the Housatonic River, arriving at an overlook of Lake Zoar, then descending to the Boys Halfway River. The trail then leaves the Housatonic River behind and heads southwest along the Boys Halfway River to Barn Hill Road.

By adding reasonably short road walks the Paugussett Trail is considered part of the larger Lake Zoar Blue-Blazed Trails which span both the west and east banks of Lake Zoar. The Kettletown State Park trails can be reached via a road walk by following Connecticut Route 34 east over the Stevenson Dam, then following Copper Mine Road to Freeman Road to Fiddlehead Road. Zoar Trail in lower Paugussett State Forest can be reached via a road walk by following Connecticut Route 34 west to Great Quarter Road (just over the Newtown border).

There are several trails in Shelton and Monroe which cross and connect with the Paugussett Trail including the Birchbank Mountain White Trail (a part of Paugussett Blue-Blazed Trail until ruinous ATV ruts caused the Connecticut Forest and Park Association to abandon it), the trails at Shelton Lakes, and the Webb Mountain Trails.

=== Trail communities ===
The official Blue-Blazed Paugussett Trail passes through land located within the following municipalities, from south to north: Shelton, Connecticut, Monroe, Connecticut

Remnants of the original Paugussett Trail still exist as local trails in the communities of Monroe, Connecticut, Shelton, Connecticut and Stratford, Connecticut.

== History and folklore ==
The Paugussett Blue-Blazed Trail was originally created with the help of the Great Depression era Civilian Conservation Corps (CCC) while Indian Well State Park was a Works Projects Administration (WPA) project.

Indian Well in Shelton is named the pool beneath the waterfall at the entrance to the state park as well as for the legend of a Native American tragic romance between a Paugussett man and a Pootatuck woman.

The route of the original and planned (longer) Paugussett trail blazed can be seen in the Connecticut Forest and Park Association 1940 Connecticut Walk Book map of major trails.

In 1946, before the building of Aspetuck Village (and other housing developments) the Paugussett Trail crossed the entire length of Shelton, Connecticut rather than ending near the Connecticut Route 110 entrance to Indian Well State Park. It left Shelton just below the Trap Falls Reservoir, entering into Stratford at the town-owned Roosevelt Forest (bordered by Trumbull and Shelton, located near Connecticut Route 8 exit 11).

The Shelton Trails Committee extended the Paugussett Trail from Indian Well State Park to the Shelton Lakes Greenway in 2012.

Roosevelt Forest in Stratford was purchased and developed as a project by the Works Projects Administration (WPA) during the Great Depression and is named after President Franklin D. Roosevelt. It has been expanded in recent times by the addition of land, including a few acres across the border in Shelton. It contains many hiking trails. Note that only cars with Town of Stratford resident stickers are officially allowed parking privileges inside Roosevelt Forest (others are supposed to pay a non-resident fee though this may not be enforced).

=== Origin and name ===
Paugussett is the name of an Algonquian-speaking native American tribe and sachemdom existing in southwestern Connecticut in the 17th century.

Derby Connecticut was once known as "Paugussett" before it was renamed in 1675.

Paugussett villages existed in Bridgeport, Trumbull, Stratford, Shelton, Monroe and Oxford in Fairfield County as well as in what is now Milford, Orange, Woodbridge, Beacon Falls, Derby and Naugatuck in New Haven County, Connecticut. The Naugatuck were a branch of the Paugussett.

Descendants of the southeast Fairfield County Connecticut branch of the Paugussett tribe (known as the "Golden Hill" Paugussetts) today have a reservation in Colchester Connecticut (New London County) as well as a small land holding in the Nichols section of Trumbull, Connecticut.

For more information on the Paugussett native-Americans ("American Indians") see the Wikipedia entry on the Paugussett as well as the Golden Hill Paugussett website.

=== Historic sites ===
Lake Zoar was created in 1919 by the construction of the Stevenson Dam to produce hydro-electric power and to provide Housatonic River vehicle crossing.

Lake Housatonic is the Housatonic River section south of the Stevenson Dam which parallels the Paugussett Trail which was created by the construction of the Derby Dam (now known as the Lake Housatonic Dam) in October 1870 to provide a river crossing as well as water for nearby industry.

Webb Mountain Park was a farm owned by the Mr. and Mrs. Alfred E. Wagner which was purchased by the Town of Monroe in 1972.

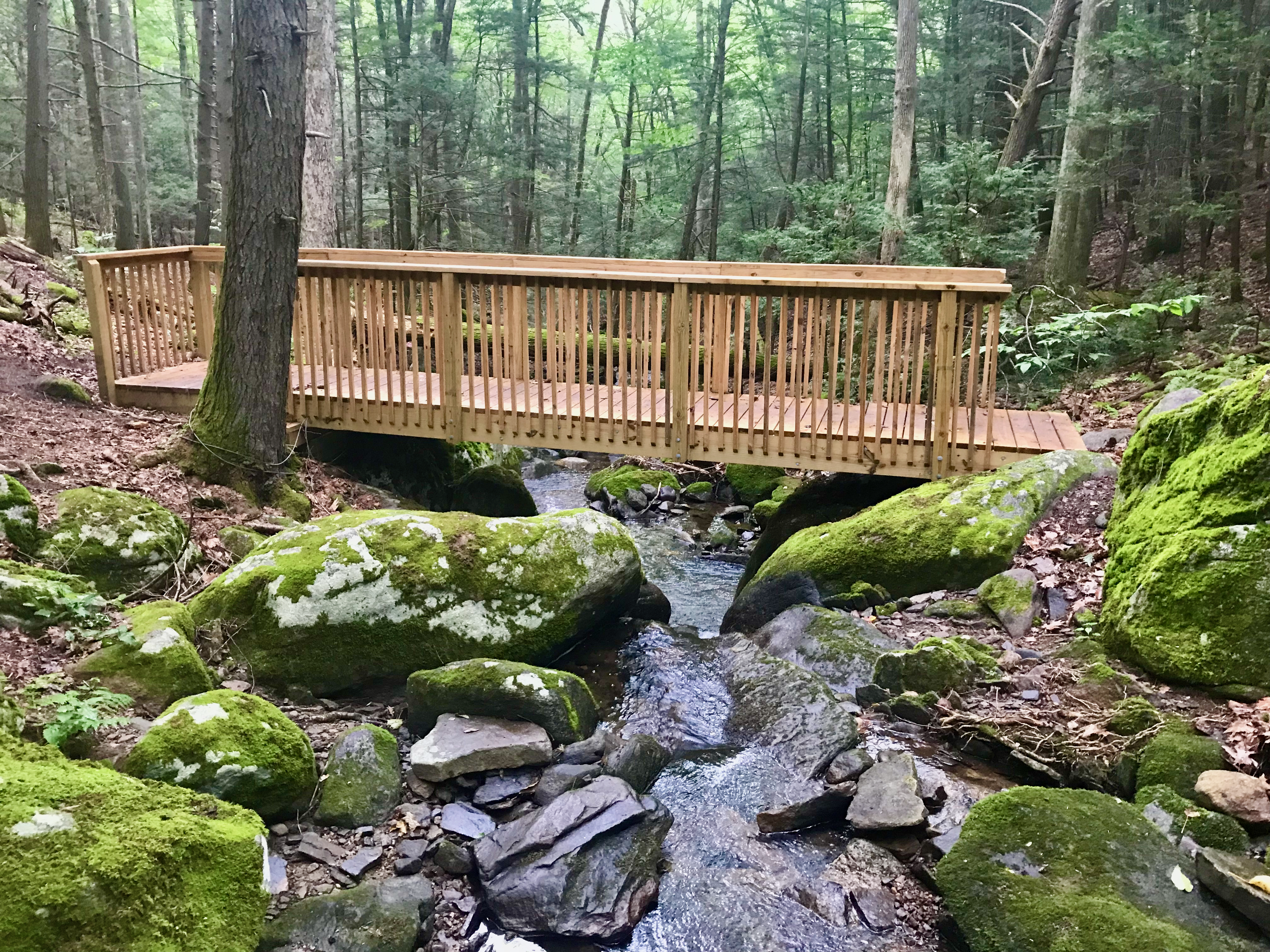
Paugussett Trail footbridge over Round Hill Brook in Webb Mountain Park

== Hiking the trail ==
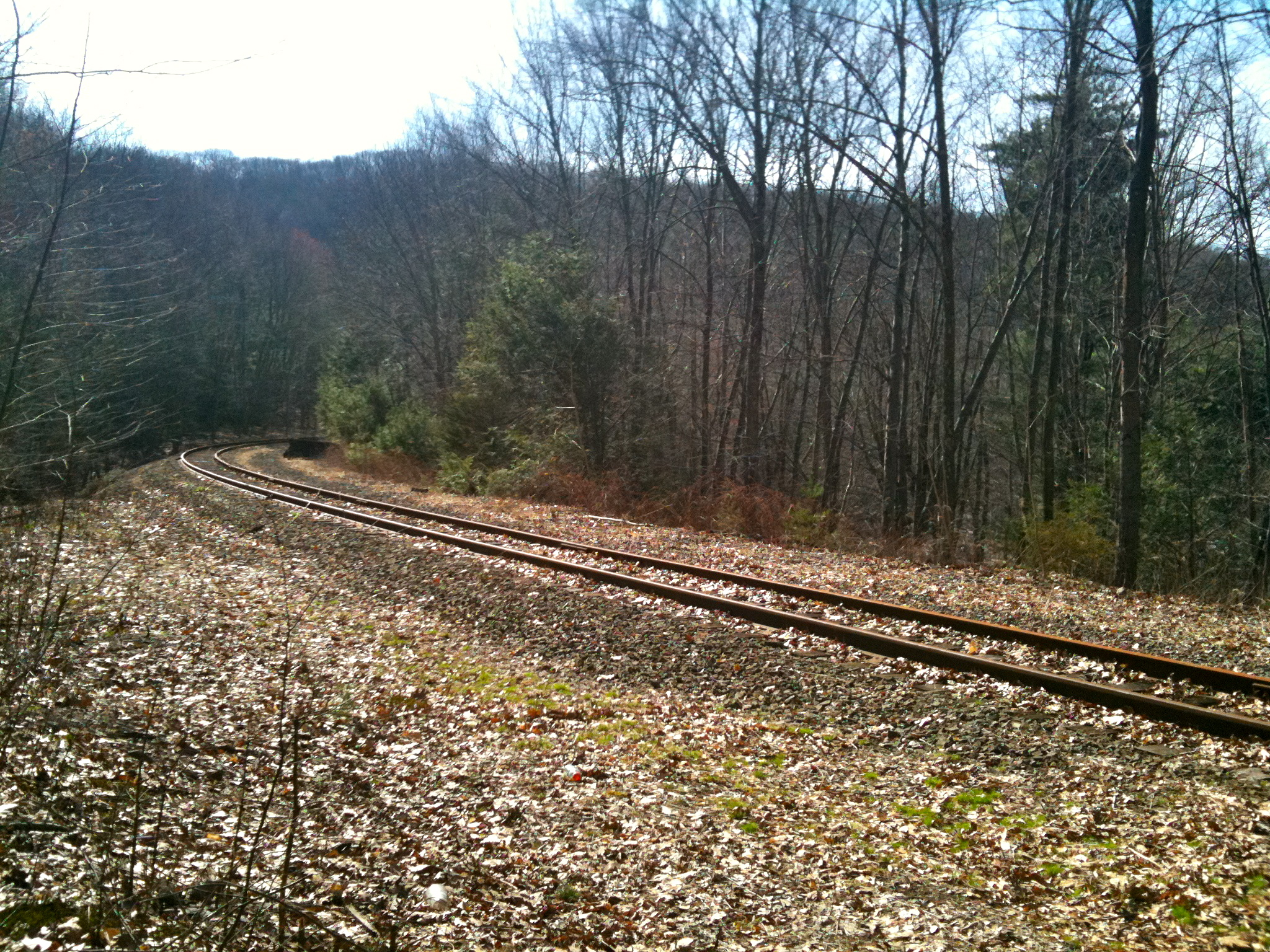
The Paugussett Trail access spur crosses railroad tracks near CT Route 34 and Lake Zoar, Monroe, CT.

The mainline Paugussett trail is blazed with blue rectangles. It is regularly maintained, and is considered easy hiking, with very few sections of rugged and moderately difficult hiking (notably the initial steep climb near the Indian Well waterfall and the steep climb using "stairs" between two suburban houses at Princess Wenonah Drive in Shelton).

Much of the Paugussett Trail is close to public roads. There are limited camping facilities in Webb Mountain Park (reservations required) along the trail and camping is prohibited in Indian Well State Park. Trail descriptions are available from a number of commercial and non-commercial sources, and a complete guidebook is published by the Connecticut Forest and Park Association

Weather along the route is typical of Connecticut. Conditions on exposed ridge tops and summits may be harsher during cold or stormy weather. Lightning is a hazard on exposed summits and ledges during thunderstorms. Snow is common in the winter and may necessitate the use of snowshoes. Ice can form on exposed ledges and summits, making hiking dangerous without special equipment.

Extensive flooding in ponds, puddles and streams may occur in the late winter or early spring, overflowing into the trail and causing very muddy conditions. In this case fairly high waterproof boots are recommended. Some parts of the trail follow forest roads which often contain ruts from ATVs and four-wheel drive vehicles.

Biting insects can be bothersome during warm weather. Parasitic deer ticks (which are known to carry Lyme disease) are a potential hazard.

The mainline trailheads are very close to civilization (and state highways). Parts of the trail are very suburban, traveling on streets, cutting between yards or running behind back yards.

A very small part of the trail is adjacent to, or is on lands where hunting and the use of firearms are permitted. Wearing bright orange clothing during the hunting season (Fall through December) is recommended.

== Conservation and maintenance of the trail corridor ==
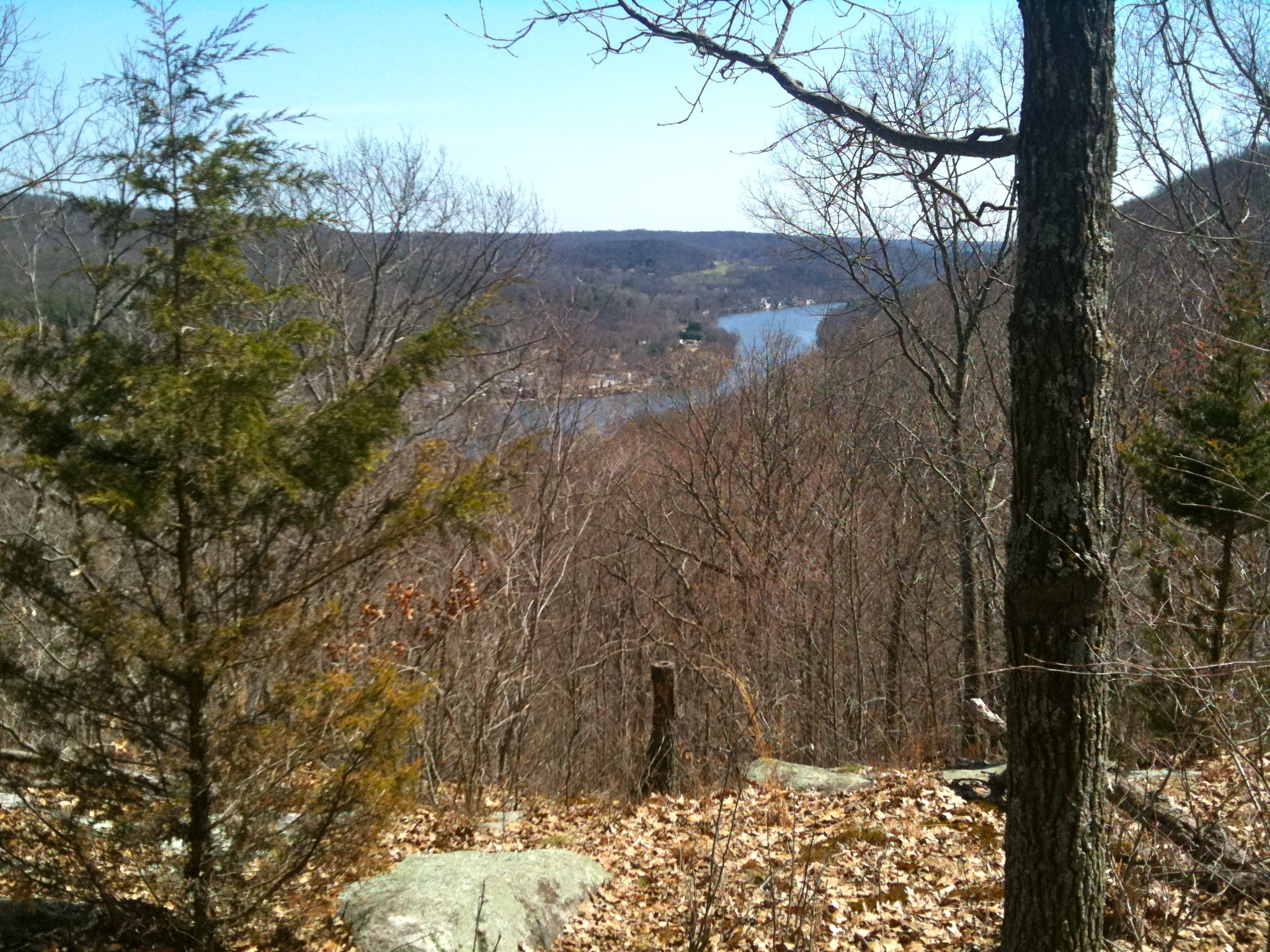
View of Housatonic River, facing south, from scenic overlook spur for Paugussett Trail near Golden Hill Lane, Shelton, CT.

== See also ==
- Blue-Blazed Trails
- List of Connecticut rivers
