= Connecticut 400 =

This trail system is a part of the Connecticut 400, one of the official Blue-Blazed (or similar) trails listed in the Connecticut Walk Book by the Connecticut Forest and Park Association (CFPA) and recognized, since 1976, with an award known as the "Connecticut 400 Club" by the Connecticut Chapter of the Appalachian Mountain Club (AMC). In 1976 there were only four hundred miles of Blue-Blazed trail but today (2010) the total length of the trails listed in the CFPA Connecticut Walk Books (East and West) exceeds 825 miles.

The State of Connecticut Department of Environmental Protection (CT DEP) Forestry Division provides two awards for locating and visiting "letterboxes" (similar to geocaches) in Connecticut's State Forests. The commemorative State Forest Centennial Patch is available to those who complete five sponsored "letterbox" hikes (in each separate state forest you must hike the described route, find the "letterbox/cache" and record your visit in the "letterbox" book). The State Forest Centennial campaign dates to 2003 (the centennial of the first official state forest in Connecticut). A walking stick is available for those who complete the letterbox hike of all thirty-two (32) of the state forests. Many of the "Blue-Blazed" hiking trails in Connecticut travel through or near one or more of the State Forests, often very close to the sponsored (DEP) letterbox.
