= Blue-Blazed Trails =

System of hiking trails in Connecticut, U.S.

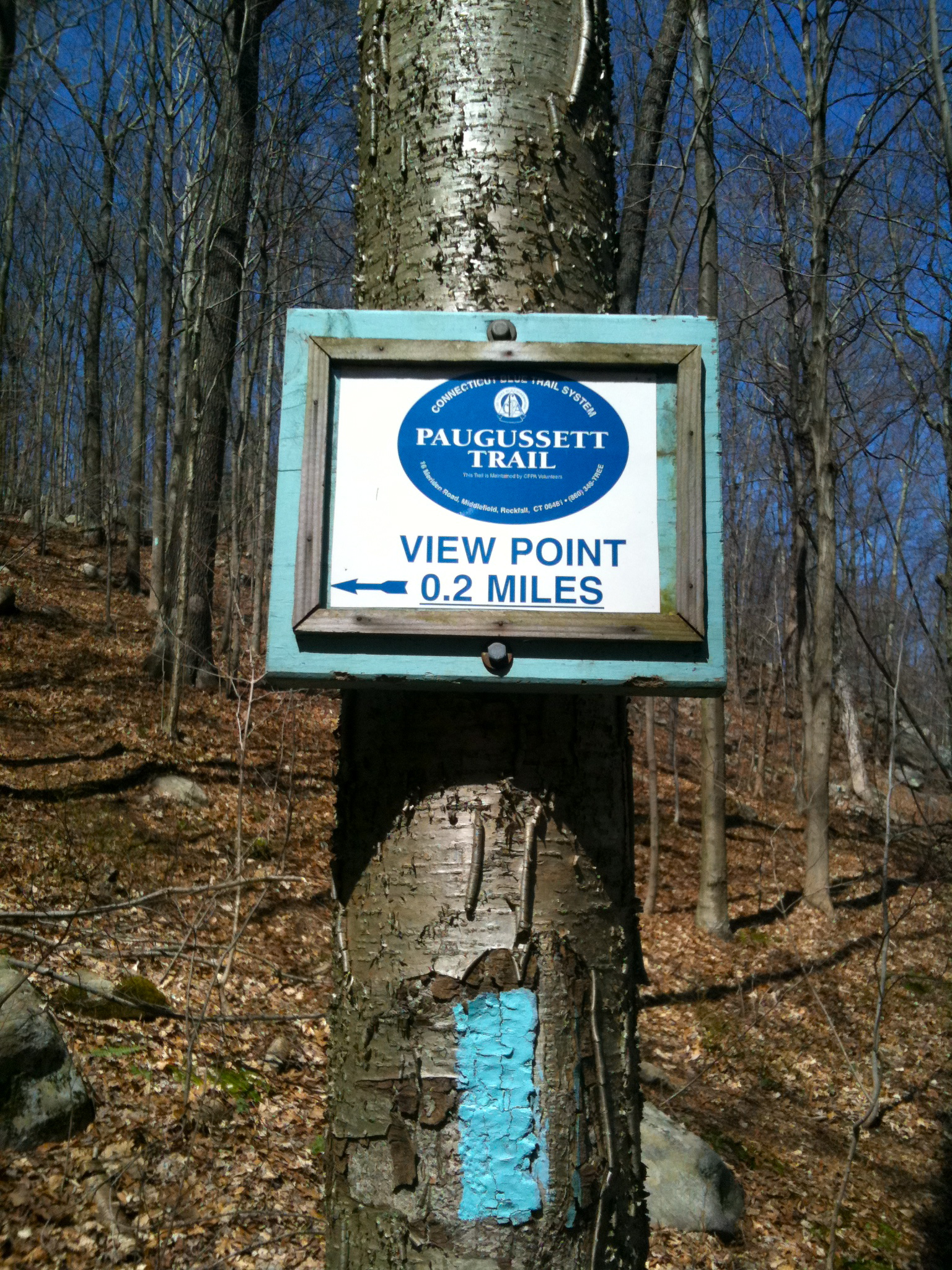
Blue Blaze and CFPA Sign for scenic overlook spur on tree along Paugussett Trail near Golden Hill Lane in Shelton, Connecticut

The Blue-Blazed Hiking Trail (BBHT) system, managed by the Connecticut Forest & Park Association (CFPA), and the related trail systems documented in the two-volume ("East" and "West") 19th Edition of the "Connecticut Walk Book" comprise over 800 miles of hiking trails in Connecticut.

There are now over 825 miles of CFPA Blue-Blazed Hiking Trails that pass through 96 towns traversing both public and private lands. This includes all official main and side trails. The main line trails are marked using the solid light blue rectangular vertical paint blaze. A recent change in blaze design to official CFPA connector, side and alternate trails is now in use. The new design standard for blaze markings for these trails is the same light blue blaze as the main trails with the designated color square painted below and abutting to the blue blaze.

The Blue-Blazed Hiking Trails and other trail systems listed in the Connecticut Walk Books by the Connecticut Forest & Park Association are also known as the Connecticut 400 for their total length in miles in the early 1970s.

== List of trails ==
The list of Blue-Blazed (maintained by the CFPA) and other trails listed in the current Connecticut Walk Books and/or CFPA website are:

- Alain & May White Nature Trails
- American Legion
- Appalachian Trail
- Aspetuck Valley
- Bigelow Hollow
- Case Mountain
- Chatfield
- Cockaponset
- Falls Brook
- Field Forest Trails
- Finch Brook Trail
- Gay City
- Goodwin State Forest Trails
- Hancock Brook
- Hatchery Brook Loop Trails
- Highlawn Forest Trails
- Housatonic Range
- Iron Trail
- Jericho
- John Muir Trail
- Kettletown
- Lillinonah
- Lone Pine
- Macedonia Brook
- Mattabesett
- Mattatuck
- McLean Game Refuge
- Menunkatuck
- Metacomet
- Mohawk
- Narragansett
- Natchaug
- Naugatuck
- Nayantaquit
- Nehantic
- New England National Scenic Trail
- Nipmuck
- Old Furnace
- Pachaug
- Paugussett
- Peoples
- Pequot
- Pine Knob
- Pomperaug
- Quinebaug
- Quinnipiac
- Ragged Mountain
- Regicides
- Risley Pond Loop Trail
- Salmon River
- Saugatuck
- Scoville Loop
- Shenipsit
- Sleeping Giant
- Stony Creek Quarry
- Sunny Valley Preserve
- Tunxis
- Whitestone Cliffs
- Whitney Forest Trail
- Wolcott Trail
- Zoar

== Signage and other markers ==
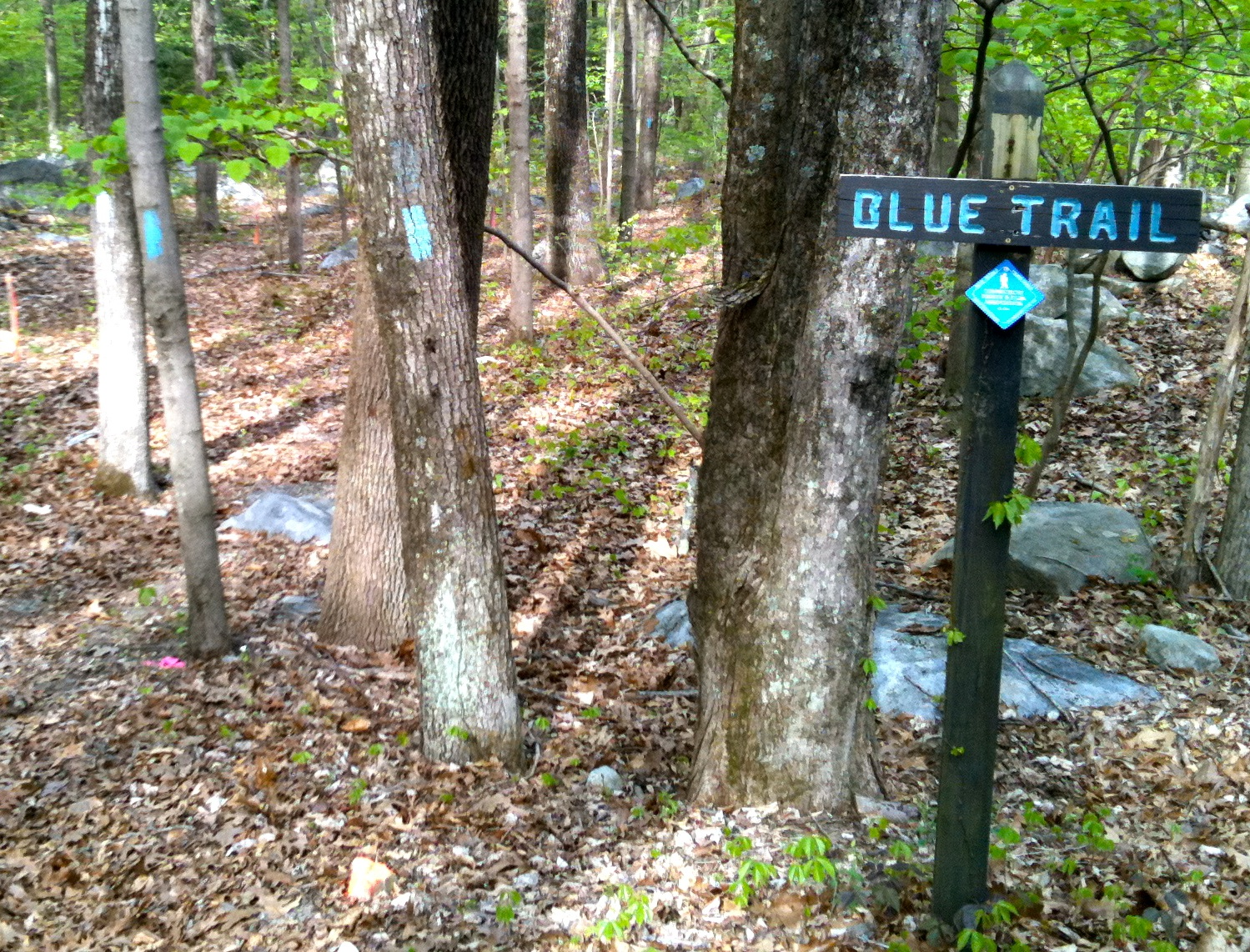
An example of several different trail markers in use: wooden sign, blue diamond sign, light blue paint blazes. The Housatonic Range Trail (AKA Candlewood Mountain Trail) crossing on Squash Hollow Road in New Milford, CT.

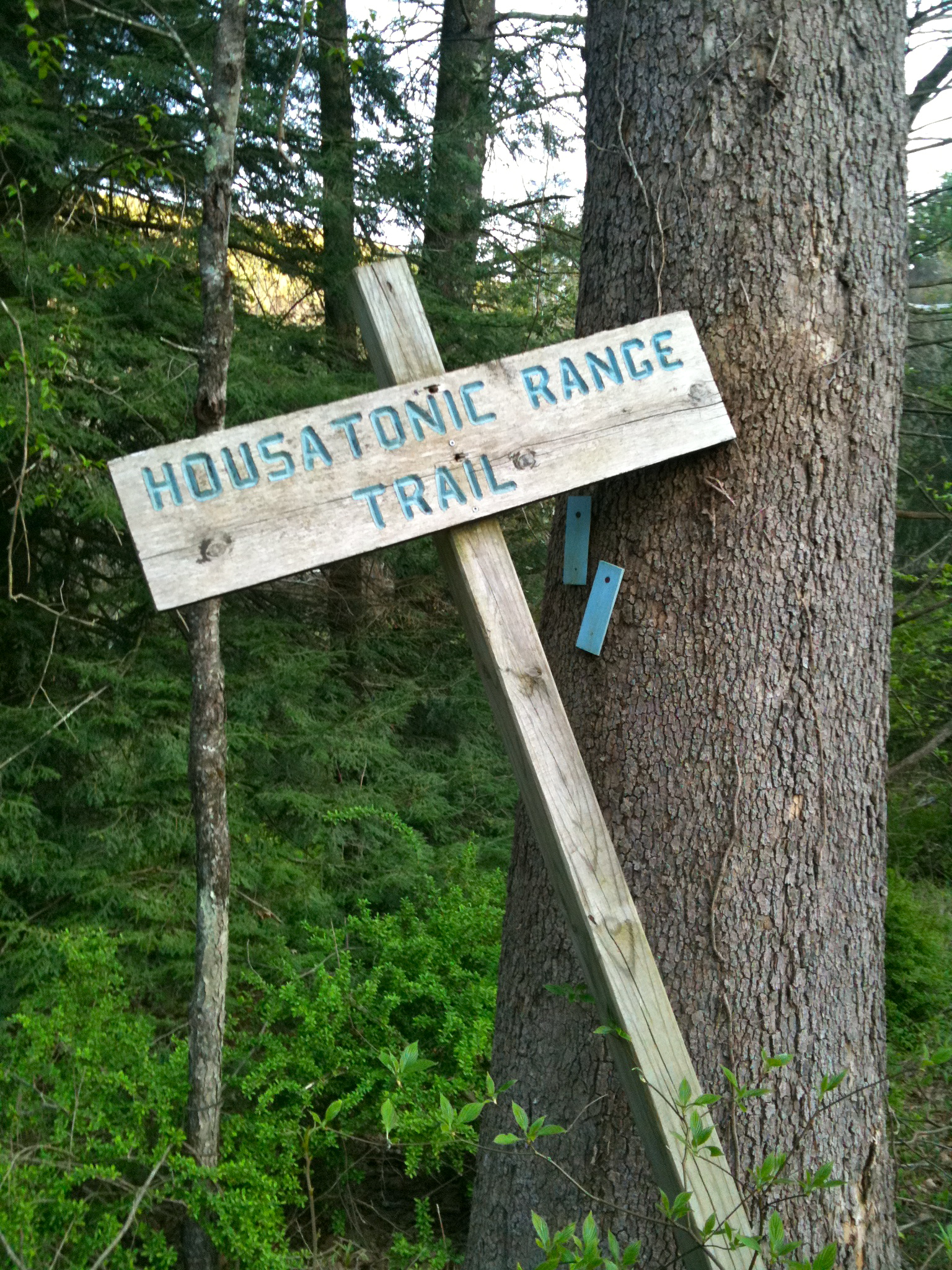
At the Housatonic Range Trail's Northern Terminus: a wooden trail head sign and light blue painted wood tags indicating a left turn.

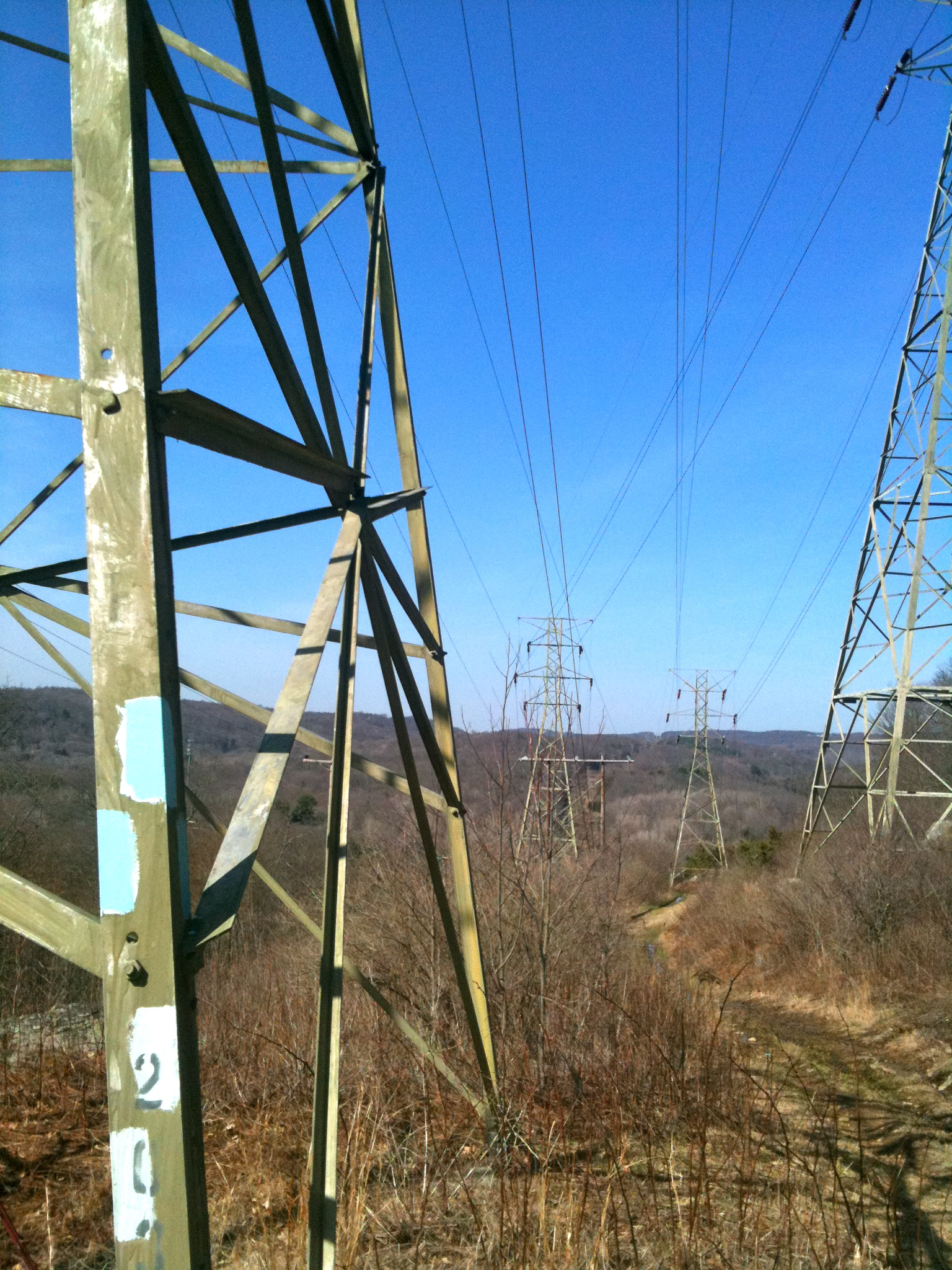
The Blue Blazes are not just for trees, where necessary they are painted on rocks, telephone poles, fences or power line towers. A right turn.

While the light blue paint blazes are usually vertical rectangles painted on trees to mark the trail, there is often a bit of variety in terms of both paint blazes and signage found on a Blue-Blazed Hiking Trail. Usually direction is indicated with one blaze to indicate 'go straight ahead', two blazes with the top blaze to the left indicating a left turn, two blazes with the top blaze to the right indicating a right turn, and two blazes directly on top of each other indicating the end of a trail (two parallel horizontal rectangles is the new preferred form). Three blazes indicates that the trail is forking in two different directions (as in a loop). But directional arrows are also often painted on rocks, trees and other stationary objects, particularly when they can provide better information (such as 'Up!' on a rock climb). Occasionally sticks or poles places in the ground are used instead of trees (especially in open fields) with a blue blaze or the top painted blue. Blue blazes are painted on telephone poles, road guard rails, buildings (rarely) and other signs (rarely). Sometimes wooden tags or wooden arrows are nailed to trees (or sticks stuck in the ground) though this is much more common on non-Blue-Blazed trails. Some trail sections are marked using blue plastic diamond signs or metallic disks nailed in trees rather than painted blazes.

Signs indicating the terminus, parking area, intersection of side trails or other points of interest may vary also, from painted or carved/engraved/routed handmade wooden signs on trees or posts to framed glass official CFPA professionally printed white background signs to pieces of paper in plastic protectors (either handwritten or computer printed or copied).

The terminus points for major Blue-Blazed Hiking Trails and some side trails on the side of a paved road is usually marked with the signature professional blue oval sign indicating the name of the trail. These are mounted on metal posts driven deep into the ground.

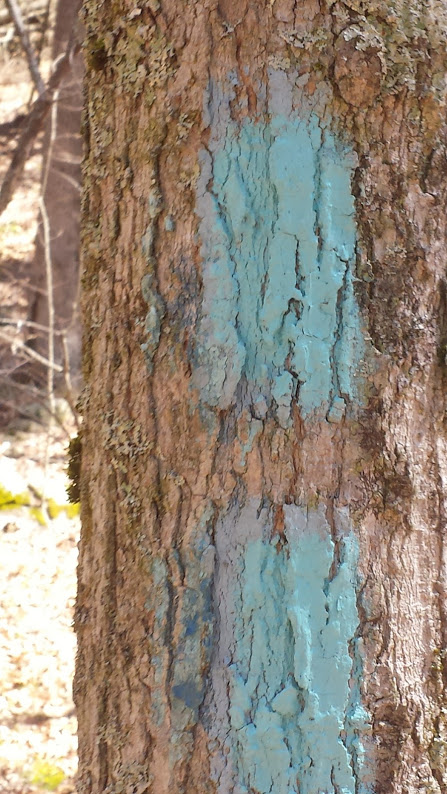
Blue Blaze signaling to proceed straight at the intersection.

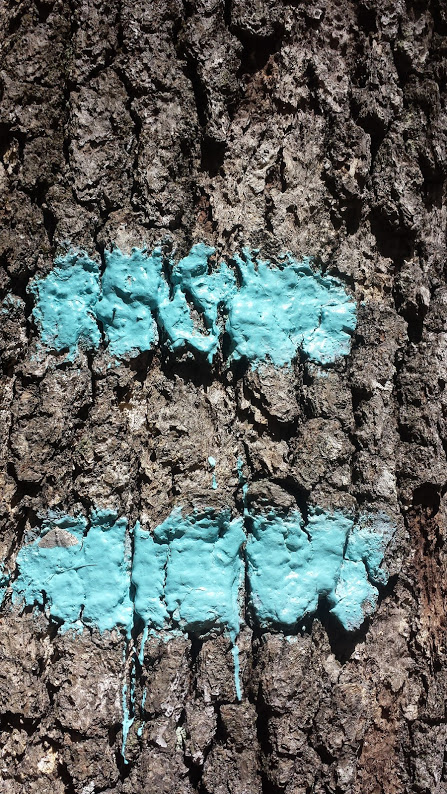
This blaze indicates the terminal end of the trail.

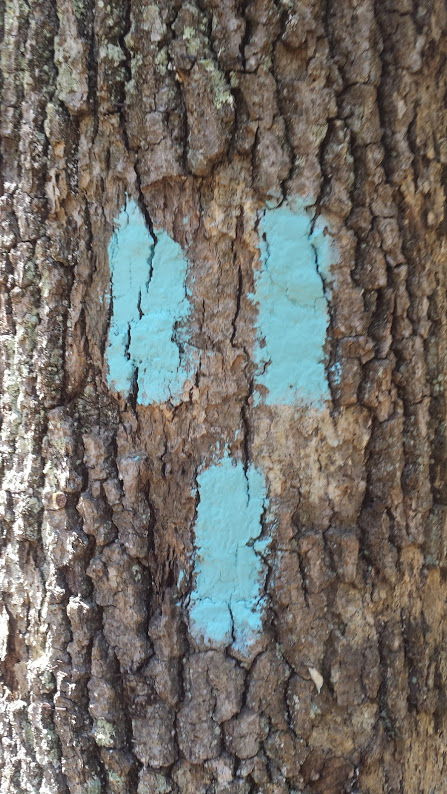
A Blaze indicating a trail junction, where trails run together, or a loop of the trail.

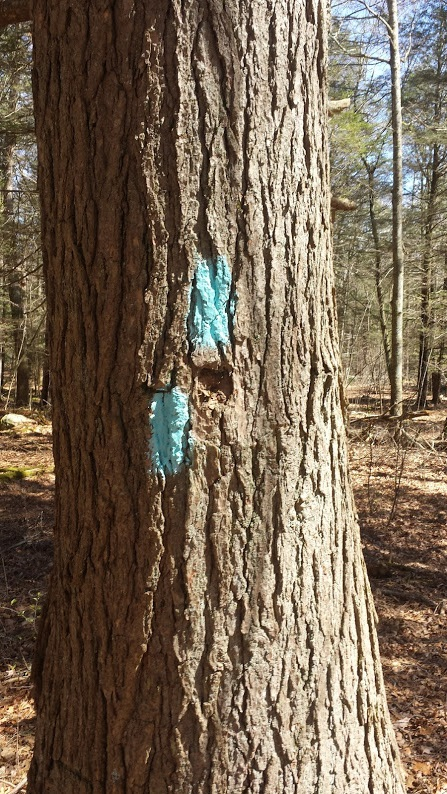
Right turn blaze.

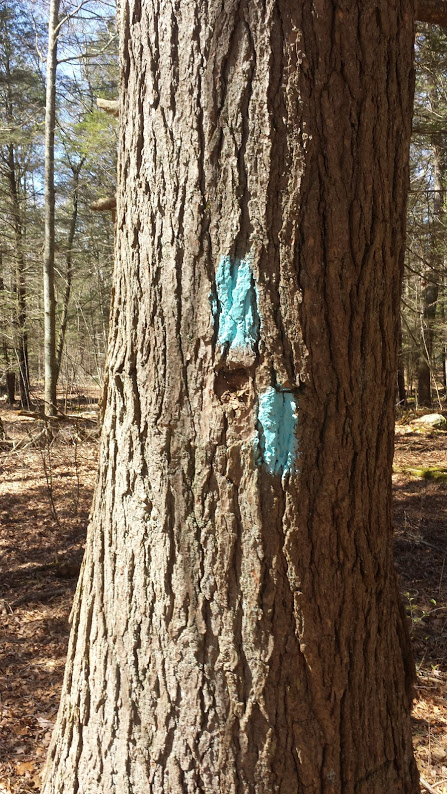
Left turn blaze.

== History ==
On December 27, 1929 at the Graduate Club in New Haven the Reverend Edgar Heermance (Connecticut Forest & Park Association's Secretary) met with several companions and described his idea for the Blue-Blazed Hiking Trail System. The group embraced the concept and formed the first CFPA "Trails Committee".

The Quinnipiac Trail was the first Blue-Blazed Hiking Trail created, followed by the Metacomet Trail and Mattabesett Trail in 1931–1932.

During the Depression the size of the Blue-Blazed Hiking Trail system expanded both in total length and the number of trails. In many cases unemployed workers were used to help build the trails as well as other projects in Connecticut's parks and forests as a part of the Civilian Conservation Corps (CCC) and similar (e.g. state and municipal) work camps and programs.

After rapid growth in the 1930s persisting into the mid-1940s, the post-"World War 2" housing boom began to encroach upon sections of the Blue-Blazed Hiking Trails, particularly in heavily populated areas affected by the move from urban cities to suburban developments. This trend continued in the latter half of the twentieth century, accelerating in some cases, and even expanding in the new millennium following a new trend of prosperous residents moving to large expensive houses on multi-acre lots in rural exurbs far from population centers (often derisively nicknamed "McMansions").

Residential housing and follow-on commercial development caused hiking trails to be re-routed or disappear altogether if a suitable detour could not be found.

The route of the original (much longer) Naugatuck Trail and several other CFPA trails blazed in the 1930s can be seen in the Connecticut Forest & Park Association's 1940 Connecticut Walk Book map of major trails. On the same map you can see that at one point in time almost all of the major Blue-Blazed Trails west of the Connecticut River were interconnected (the Appalachian, Mattatuck, Tunxis, Quinnipiac, Mattabesett, Metacomet, Naugatuck, Pomeraug and Paugusett).

Several trails were truncated or were broken into pieces with gaps (e.g. the Tunxis and Mattatuck trails). References to lost or vestigial portions of Blue-Blazed Hiking Trails can still be found in the land use planning documents of local municipalities such as recommendations to purchase for open space several tracts of land over which the Naugatuck Blue-Blazed Hiking Trail once traveled (e.g. April 1998 Town of Bethany Conservation Commission's 'Open Space Plan').

The number of Blue-Blazed Hiking Trails and their total mileage have continued to increase in recent years. The Saugatuck and Aspetuck Valley Blue-Blazed hiking trails in Fairfield County were added in 2005 and 2006 respectively as a result of agreements reached between the CFPA, Nature Conservancy, the State of Connecticut Department of Environmental Protection (DEP) and the Aquarion Water Company (previously the Bridgeport Hydraulic Company). In 2014, the two trails were joined to create over 18 miles on continuous trail is the heart of Fairfield County.

== Recognition/Inspiration programs ==
The Connecticut Forest & Park Association (CFPA) offers the Blue Trails Challenge. Hike any of the trails in the Blue-Blazed Hiking Trail System, log your miles, and earn prizes. There are four categories (50, 200, 400, and 800 miles).

In 1974 the Connecticut 400 Club award was established by the Connecticut Chapter of the Appalachian Mountain Club (AMC) to recognize those who have hiked the entire length of all of the trails (Blue-Blazed and not, main line, connector and others) listed in the Connecticut Walk Books. The Connecticut Walk Book West (2006, 19th ed.) includes a Connecticut 400 Club hiking log and instructions on submitting the log for the award.

The State of Connecticut Department of Energy and Environmental Protection (CT DEEP) Forestry Division provides two awards for locating and visiting "letterboxes" (similar to geocaches) in Connecticut's State Forests. The commemorative 'State Forest Centennial Patch' is available to those who complete five sponsored "letterbox" hikes (in each separate state forest you must hike the described route, find the "letterbox/cache" and record your visit in the "letterbox" book). The State Forest Centennial campaign dates to 2003 (the centennial of the first official state forest in Connecticut). A walking stick is available for those who complete the letterbox hike of all thirty-two (32) of the state forests. Many of the Blue-Blazed Hiking Trails in Connecticut travel through or near one or more of the State Forests, often very close to the sponsored (DEEP) letterbox.

== On video ==
In 2012, the CFPA created a series of videos highlighting 10 of the Blue-Blazed Hiking Trails. The series, "Tales From The Trails", was funded by the state Office of Culture & Tourism, and promoted via their YouTube channel. (https://www.youtube.com/playlist?list=PL146788DE7B1A68B9)

== See also ==
- Connecticut Forest and Park Association
