= Lake Zoar =

Reservoir in the United States

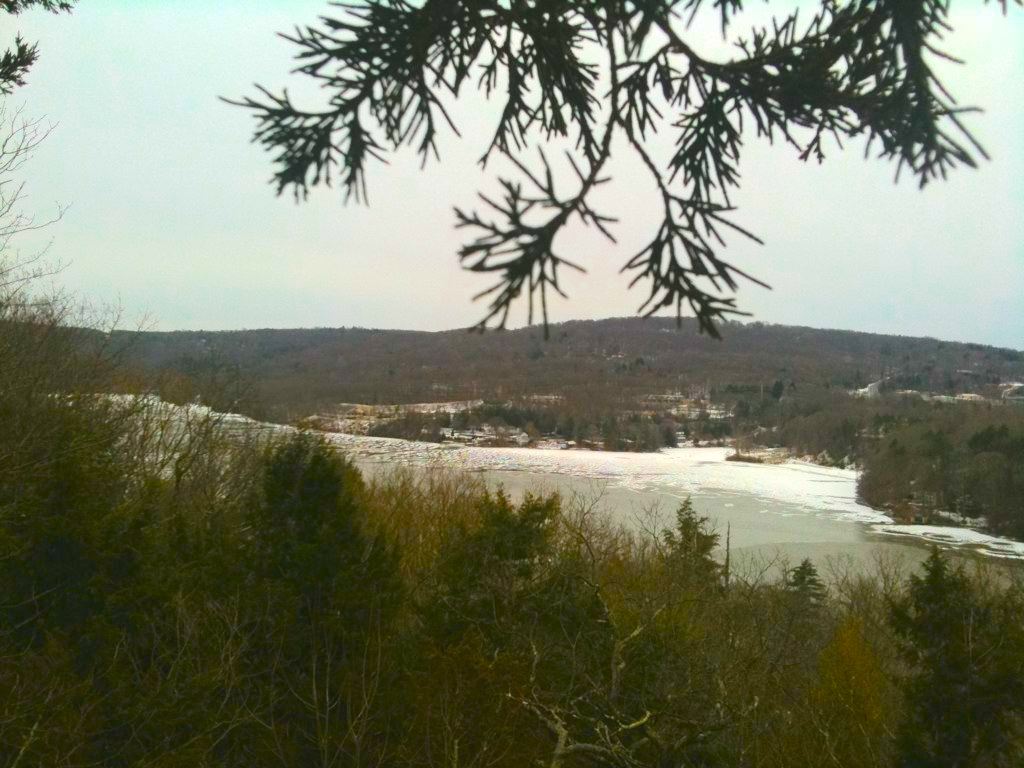
- Partially frozen Lake Zoar viewed from the Pomperaug Trail just south of Oxford Connecticut's Jackson Cove Town Park.

- Location within Connecticut
- Location: Fairfield and New Haven counties, Connecticut
- Coordinates: 41°23′18″N 73°10′39″W
- Type: Reservoir
- Managing agency: Lake Zoar Authority, 'FirstLight Power Resources'
- First flooded: 1919
- Max. length: 10 miles (16 km)
- Surface area: 909 acres (368 ha)
- Average depth: 29 feet (8.8 m)
- Max. depth: 72 feet (22 m)

Interactive map of Lake Zoar

Lake Zoar is a reservoir on the Housatonic River in the U.S. state of Connecticut. It was formed by the completion of the Stevenson Dam, which flooded an area of Oxford and Stevenson named "Pleasantvale" or "Pleasant Vale". The towns of Monroe, Newtown, Oxford, and Southbury border Lake Zoar. The name Zoar originates from corner of Newtown and Monroe that once called itself Zoar after the Biblical city Zoara near the Dead Sea.

== Lake Zoar Authority ==
Logo of the Lake Zoar Authority

The Lake Zoar Authority (LZA) is an organization for promoting safety on the lake and improving water quality. The members represent the four towns bordering the lake and meet on a monthly basis. Authority is granted through the Connecticut General Statutes, section 7-151a (of the 1969 supplement).

== Notable events ==
- 1984: Joyce Stochmal, 19, murdered and her body dumped into the lake.
- November 1986: Richard Crafts murdered his wife Helle Crafts in Newtown, froze the body, cut it up with a chainsaw and finally put it through a woodchipper from a bridge into the lake.
- September 7, 2005: A 37-year-old man named Frank Northrop died while water-skiing on the lake.
- July 17, 2007: Bonnie Thayer, 64, found dead by a scuba diver due to suicide by drowning after her disappearance in July 2005.
- July 6, 2011: 6 Easton, Trumbull, and Burlington residents injured in boat crash.
- July 2017: Randall Pineau, 52, hit and killed by a ski boat.

== Recreation ==
=== Boating ===
There is a speed limit of 45 mph (72 km/h) limit daytime, 25 mph (40 km/h) from 30 minutes after sunset to 30 minutes before sunrise. Vessels are prohibited from approaching within 300 feet (91 m) on upstream side or 700 feet (210 m) on downstream side of Stevenson Dam. Activities including fishing, water-skiing and jet skiing are permitted.

==== Access ====
Each of the towns has a public access boat launch. The Southbury location is maintained by the state of Connecticut and is open to non-town residents. Additionally, there is canoe access from Kettletown State Park.

- Monroe, Zoar Beach Boat Ramp.
- Newtown, Eichler's Cove.
- Oxford, Jackson Cove Park.
- Southbury, at the end of Scout Road.

=== Sand Bar ===
The Sand Bar is an accumulation of sand close to the center of Lake Zoar. It is a popular meeting destination for all boaters alike. The depth of the water above the sand bar varies upon the generation schedule of "First Light Hydro Generation." The depth varies from 6 inches of water at its most shallow point to a foot before receiving. The area stretches about a quarter.

=== Fishing ===
Lake Zoar is not stocked yearly with fish by the Connecticut Department of Environmental Protection, but the Pootatuck and Pomperaug rivers feed into it are heavily stocked with trout, many of which eventually make their way into the lake.

==== Fish species ====
The lake contains the desirable Smallmouth Bass, Largemouth Bass, Northern Pike, White Perch, Yellow Perch, Calico Bass (Black Crappie), White Catfish (Ictalurus catus), Brown Bullhead, Rainbow Trout, and the Common Carp.

==== PCBs and fish consumption ====
Until the chemical was banned in the 70s, the Pittsfield, Mass. General Electric Factory routinely dumped PCBs into the Housatonic. Trout, catfish, eel, carp, or northern pike from Lake Zoar are unsafe for consumption while yellow perch, calico bass, rock bass, bluegill, and sunfish can be eaten sparingly and bass should be avoided by high-risk groups. In a 2008 study by the United States Department of Health and Human Services Smallmouth Bass varied between 0.35 and 0.58 ppm, suitable for one meal per month. PCB levels in the lake have fallen considerably since the 1980s.

==== Invasive species ====
Four invasive plant species exist in the lake as of a 2007 study, including Eurasian watermilfoil, Brittle waternymph, Curly leaf pondweed, and European waterclover.

As with all the Housatonic River impoundments south of Bulls Bridge, Zebra Mussels have invaded and colonized Lake Zoar.

=== Hiking ===
The Zoar Trail is a 6.5-mile (10.5 km) Blue-Blazed Trail in Newtown maintained by the Connecticut Forest and Park Association.
