= Sunny Valley Preserve =

Nature preserve and farm in Connecticut, United States

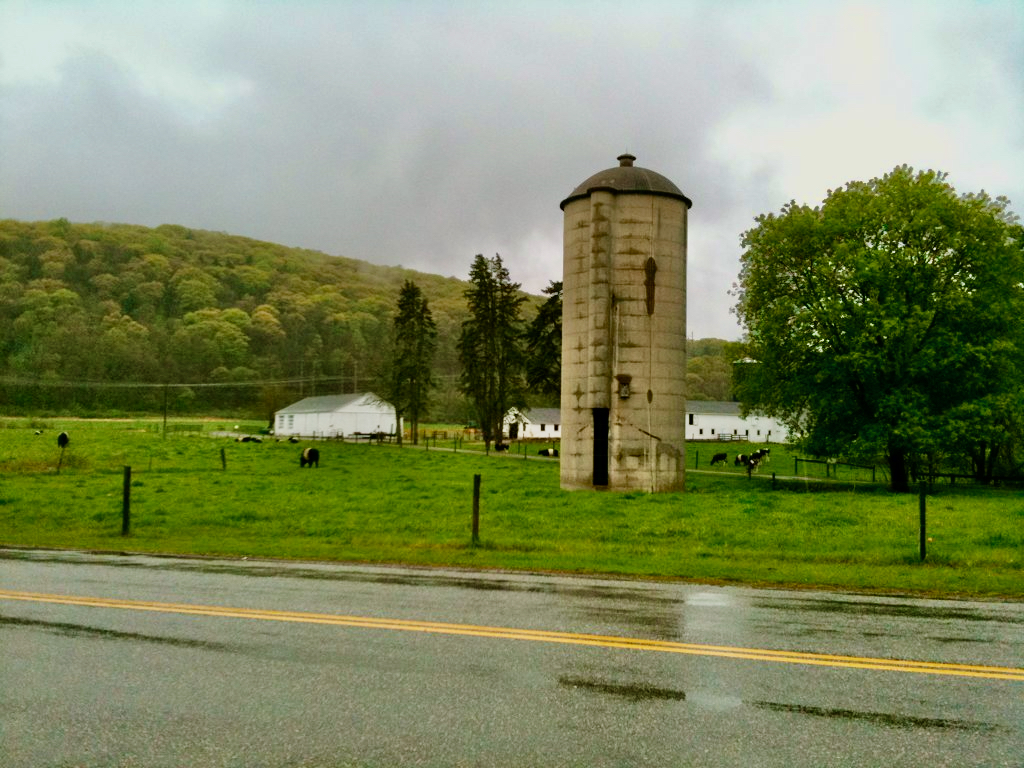
- Cows, silage and out-buildings at the Sunny Valley Preserve Farm and Nature Trails in New Milford, CT.

- Location within Connecticut
- Location: New Milford, Connecticut and Bridgewater, Connecticut, Litchfield County, Connecticut, United States
- Nearest city: Danbury, Connecticut
- Coordinates: 41.56189927925251°N 73.42510173787333°W
- Area: 1,850 acres (7.5 km^{2})
- Authorized: 1973 - 1979
- Created: 1973 - 1979
- Established: 1973 - 1979
- Designated: 1973 - 1979
- Governing body: The Nature Conservancy(TNC)
- Operator: The Nature Conservancy(TNC)
- Owner: The Nature Conservancy(TNC)
- Administrator: The Nature Conservancy(TNC)

Sunny Valley Preserve is 1,850 acres (750 ha) composed of nature preserve parcels in New Milford, Connecticut and Bridgewater, Connecticut, Litchfield County, Connecticut, United States. as well as one agricultural operation (farm).

Sunny Valley Preserve is owned by The Nature Conservancy.

The farm and offices are located at the intersection of Sunny Valley Road and Lane approximately 8 miles (13 km) north of Danbury, Connecticut.

== Hiking ==
The Sunny Valley Preserve parcels and farm contain several trails and hiking is open to the public. Camping is not allowed on the preserve's property.
