= Naugatuck Trail =

Hiking trail in Connecticut, United States

Coordinates: 41°27′28″N 73°02′03″W

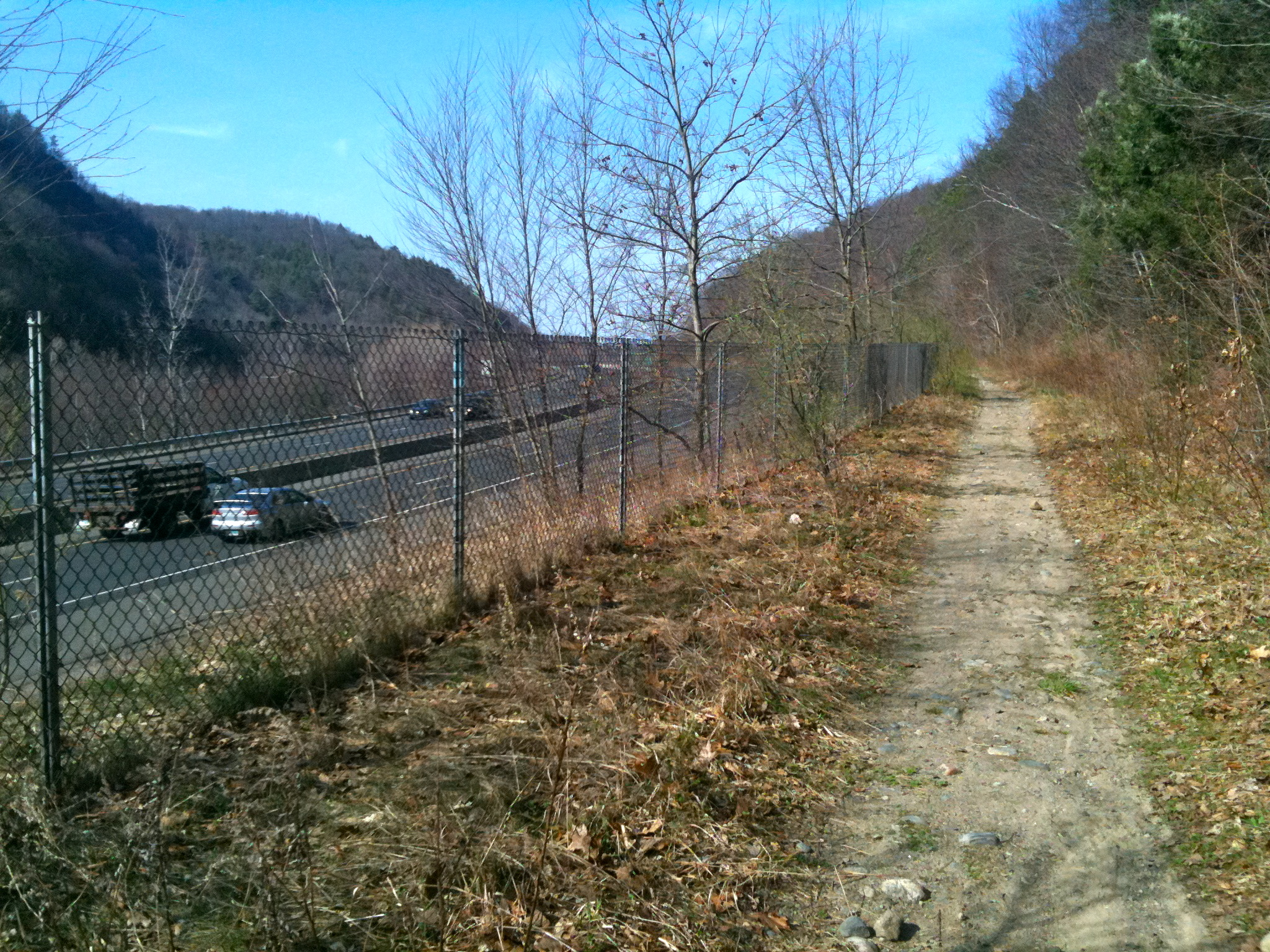
- Naugatuck Trail parallel to Connecticut State Route 8 and the Naugatuck River
- Length: 5.5 mi (8.9 km)
- Location: New Haven County, Connecticut
- Designation: CFPA Blue-Blazed Naugatuck Trail
- Use: hiking, cross-country skiing, snowshoeing, other
- Highest point: Beacon Cap 770 ft (234.7 m)
- Lowest point: Connecticut Route 8, 220 ft (67 m)
- Difficulty: easy, with very few difficult sections
- Season: easiest spring to fall
- Hazards: hunters, deer ticks, poison ivy

The Naugatuck Trail is a 6.8-mile (10.9 km) Blue-Blazed hiking trail "system" in the eastern central-lower Naugatuck River Valley in New Haven County, Connecticut, USA. It is almost entirely contained in the Naugatuck State Forest. The mainline (officially the "Blue" or "non-dot") trail is primarily east to west with three short side or spur trails. Composed of four trails (including the primarily East-to-West mainline trail (5.5 miles) plus three shorter side trails), at its western end the trail ends with a section alongside Route 8 and the Naugatuck River. During the 1930s and 1940s, it was much larger. But post–World War II housing developments of the Connecticut Blue-Blazed Trails, led to its drastic reduction.

Notable features include: the summits of Beacon Cap and Spruce Knoll. The trail goes near, but does not summit Beacon Hill (670 feet). The Connecticut Forest and Park Association is mostly responsible for its maintenance.

== Trail description ==
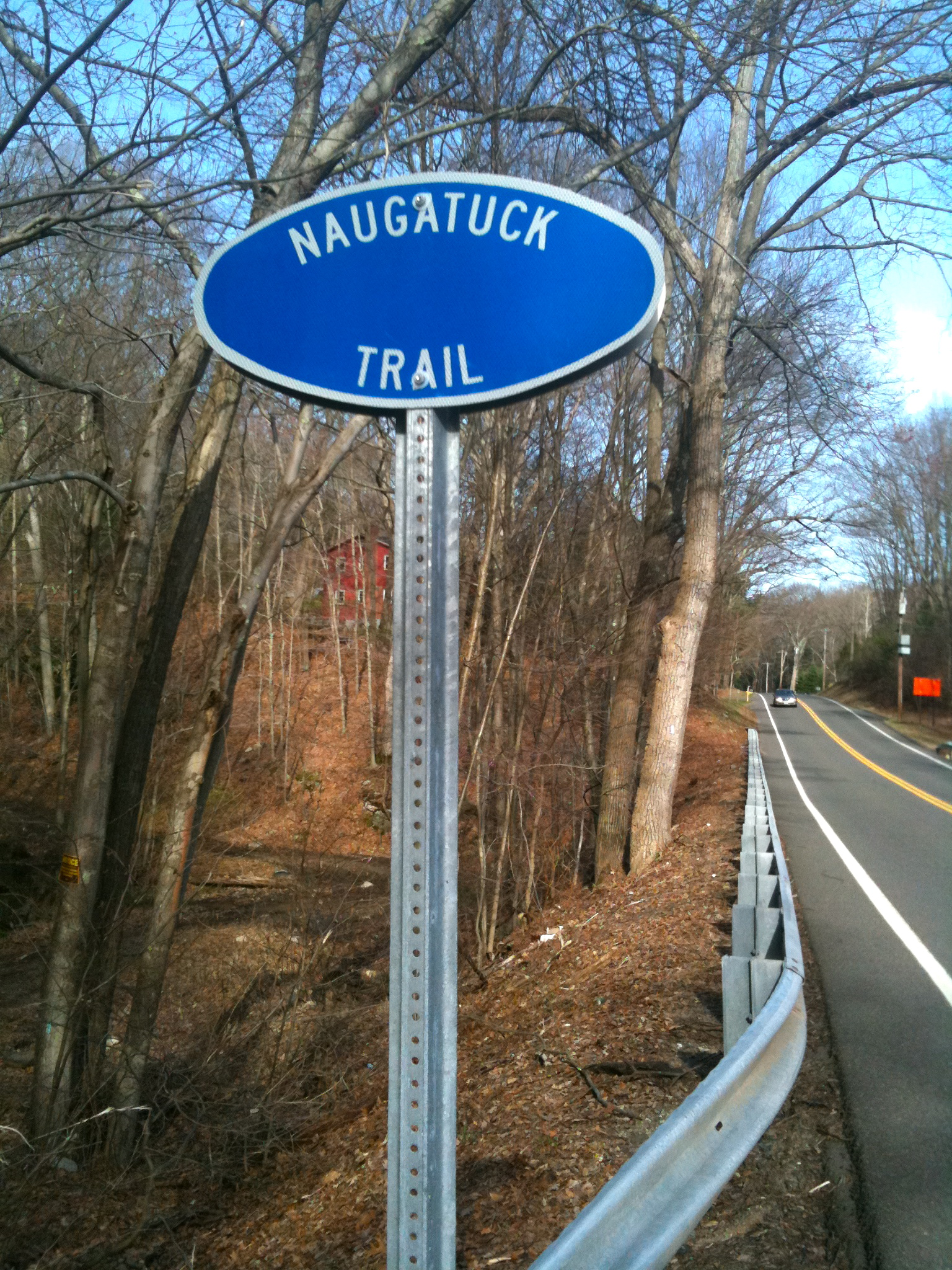
Naugatuck Trail South-Eastern Trailhead

The Naugatuck Trail extends from its western terminus at Andrasko Road in Naugatuck as an abandoned North-South road and fence-line along Connecticut Route 8 before heading east crossing successively the municipalities of Naugatuck, Beacon Falls and Bethany—all in New Haven County. Its southern terminus is located on Connecticut Route 42 just 1.2 miles west of the junction of Connecticut Route 42 and Route 63.

The Naugatuck Trail is primarily used for hiking, backpacking, picnicking, and in the winter, snowshoeing. Portions of the trail are suitable for, and are used for, mountain biking and cross-country skiing. Site-specific activities enjoyed along the route include hunting, fishing, horseback riding, bouldering and rock climbing (access). There are signs at the Connecticut Route 42 trail head forbidding rock climbing.

=== Trail route ===
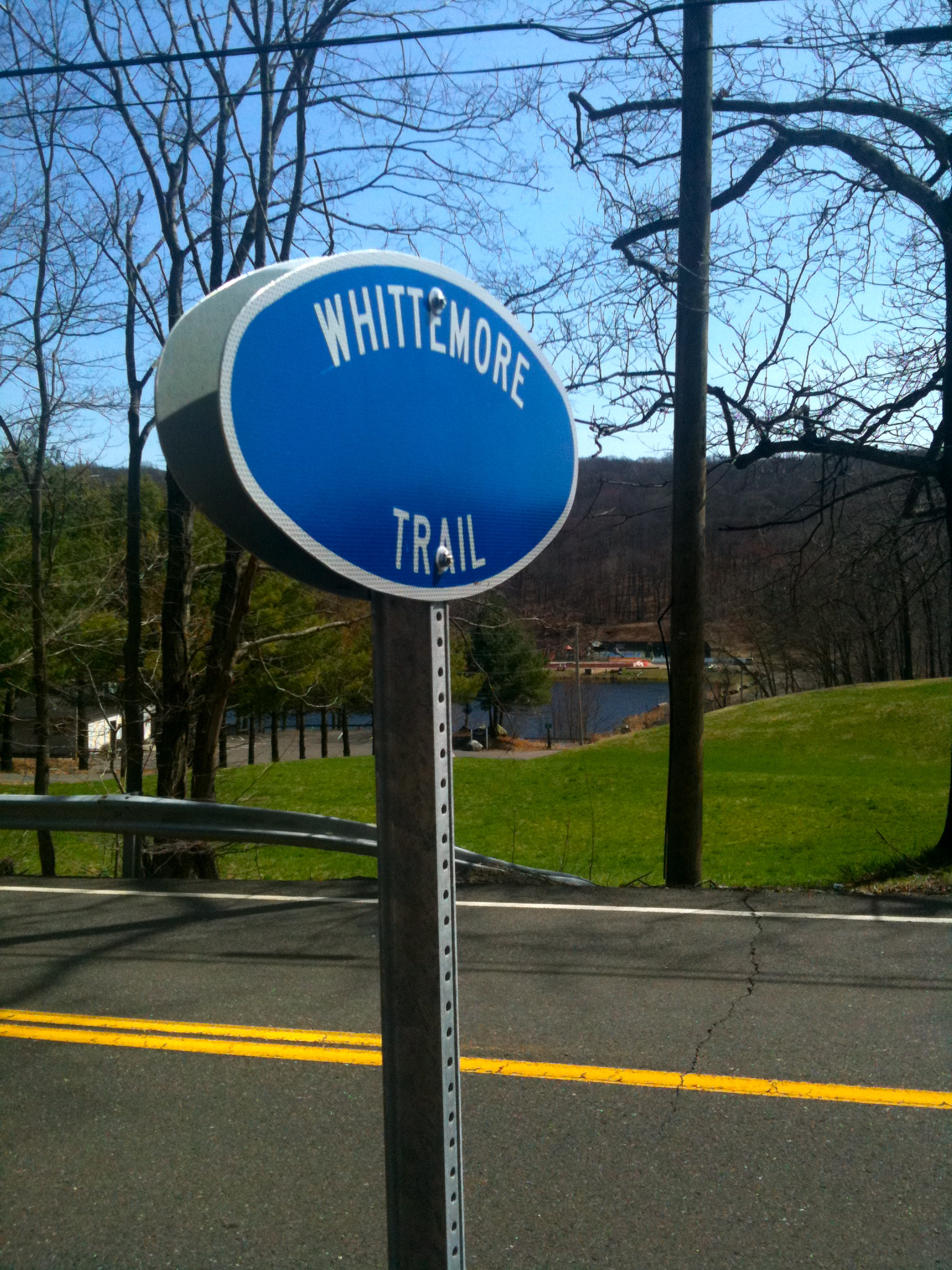
Whittemore (side) Trail Head

The official Naugatuck Trail mainline trail primarily traverses a 600-foot (above sea level) plateau running east to west which extends from Route 8 (and the Naugatuck River) to the eastern border of Naugatuck (with Bethany). From south-east to north-west, the trail system summits or travels near the ridges and peaks of Beacon Cap, Beacon Hill and Spruce Knoll. Several seasonal streams cut across the trail including Egypt Brook. The Naugatuck Trail crosses the Naugatuck State Forest, land/preservation trust, water company and private properties.

=== Trail communities ===
The official Blue-Blazed Naugatuck Trail passes through land located within the following municipalities, from south to north: Bethany, Beacon Falls and Naugatuck, Connecticut. Remnants of the original Naugatuck Trail still exist as local trails in the communities of Bethany, Orange, Woodbridge, and New Haven, Connecticut.

== History ==
The route of the original (longer) Naugatuck Trail blazed in the 1930s can be seen in the Connecticut Forest and Park Association's 1940 Connecticut Walk Book map of major trails.

There are also references to vestigial portions of the Naugatuck Trail (and recommendations to purchase tracts of land over which it traveled as open space) in the April 1998 Town of Bethany Conservation Commission's 'Open Space Plan'.

== Origin and name ==
The name Naugatuck is said to be an indigenous term (in the Native American Algonquian language) for either “one tree” or “fork of the river.”

"Naugatuck" was also the name of a village of the Paugussett sachemdom on the Naugatuck River where Naugatuck Connecticut is today. Another Paugussett sachemdom village (Capage) existed on the Naugatuck River a few miles south at what is now Beacon Falls, Connecticut.

For more information on the Naugatuck sub-tribe of native-Americans ("American Indians") see the Wikipedia entry on the Paugussett.

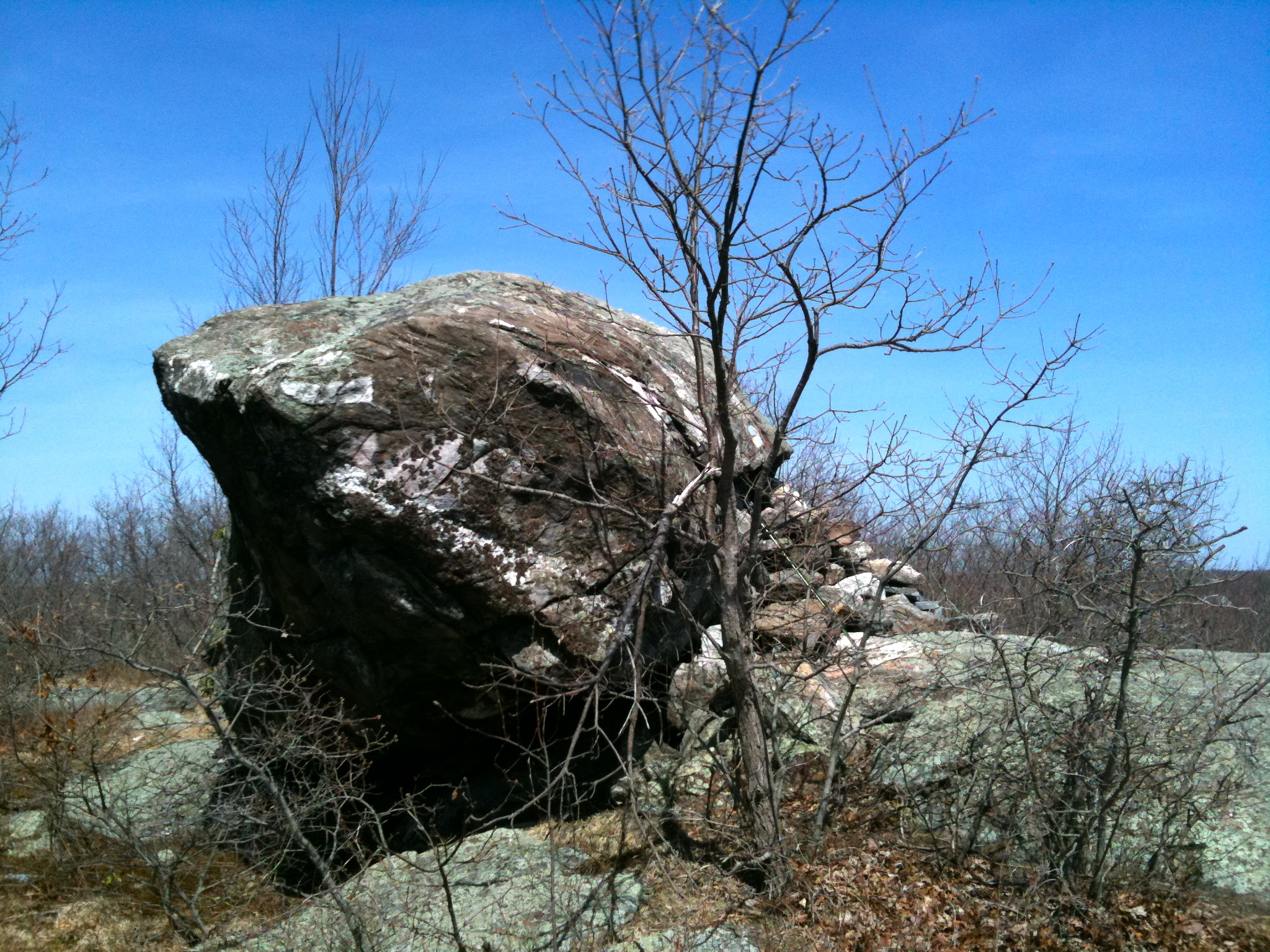
Beacon Cap is a large "glacial erratic boulder" at the end of the Beacon Cap "spur" Trail on the Bethany/Naugatuck border.

== Hiking the trail ==
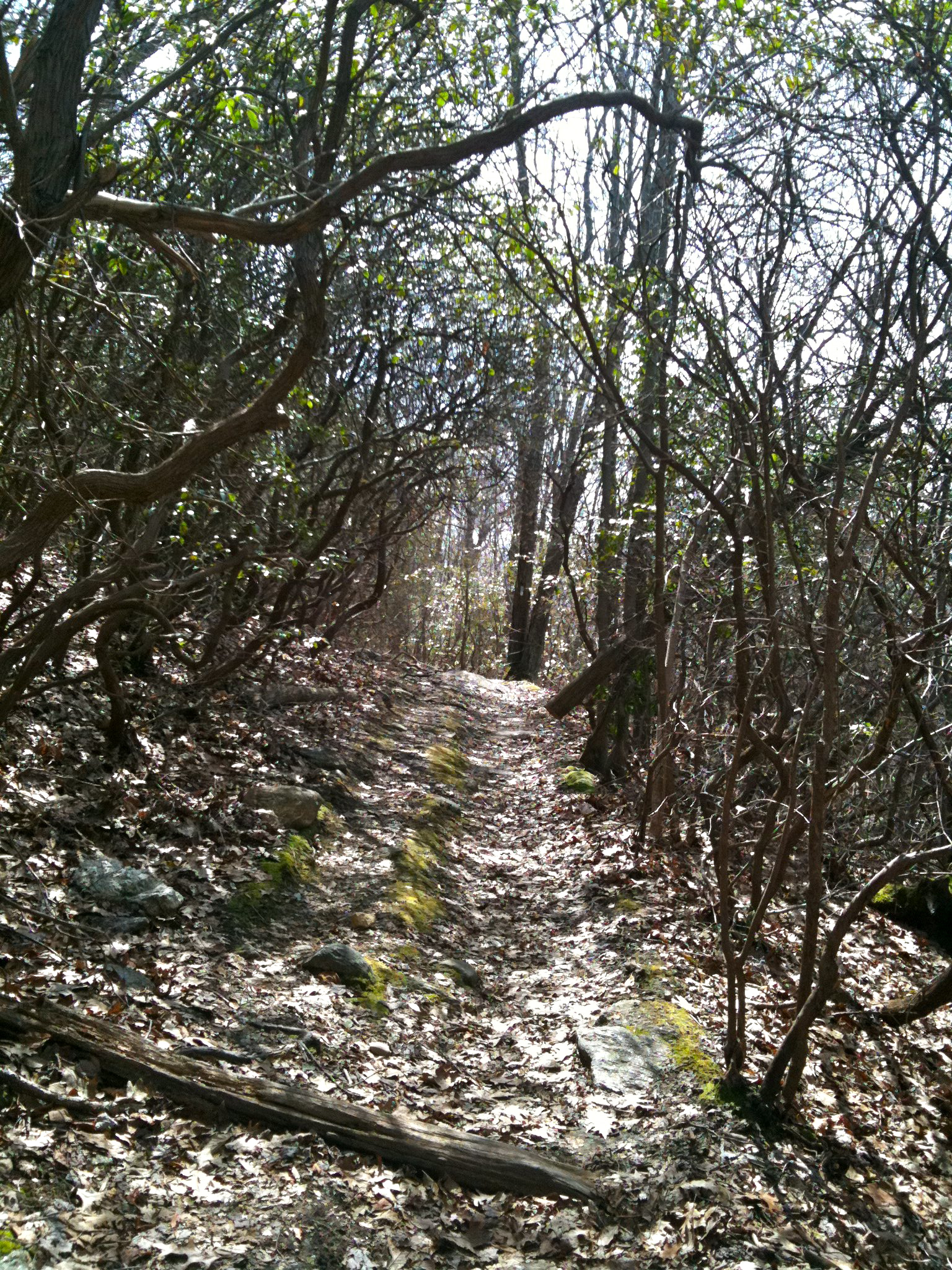
The Whittemore Trail following a forest road through dense mountain laurel.

The mainline Naugatuck trail is blazed with blue rectangles. It is regularly maintained, and is considered easy hiking, with very few sections of rugged and moderately difficult hiking. Much of the Naugatuck Trail is close to public roads. There are no camping facilities along the trail and camping is generally prohibited in Naugatuck State Forest. Trail descriptions are available from a number of commercial and non-commercial sources, and a complete guidebook is published by the Connecticut Forest and Park Association

Weather along the route is typical of Connecticut. Conditions on exposed ridge tops and summits may be harsher during cold or stormy weather. Lightning is a hazard on exposed summits and ledges during thunderstorms. Snow is common in the winter and may necessitate the use of snowshoes. Ice can form on exposed ledges and summits, making hiking dangerous without special equipment.

Extensive flooding in ponds, puddles, and streams may occur in the late winter or early spring, overflowing into the trail and causing very muddy conditions. In this case fairly high waterproof boots are recommended. Some parts of the trail follow forest roads which often contain ruts from ATVs and four-wheel drive vehicles.

Biting insects can be bothersome during warm weather. Parasitic deer ticks (which are known to carry Lyme disease) are a potential hazard. The mainline trail heads are close to civilization (suburban homes, streets and highways). Much of the trail is adjacent to, or is on lands where hunting and the use of firearms are permitted (particularly Connecticut State Forest land). Wearing bright orange clothing during the hunting season (Fall through December) is recommended.

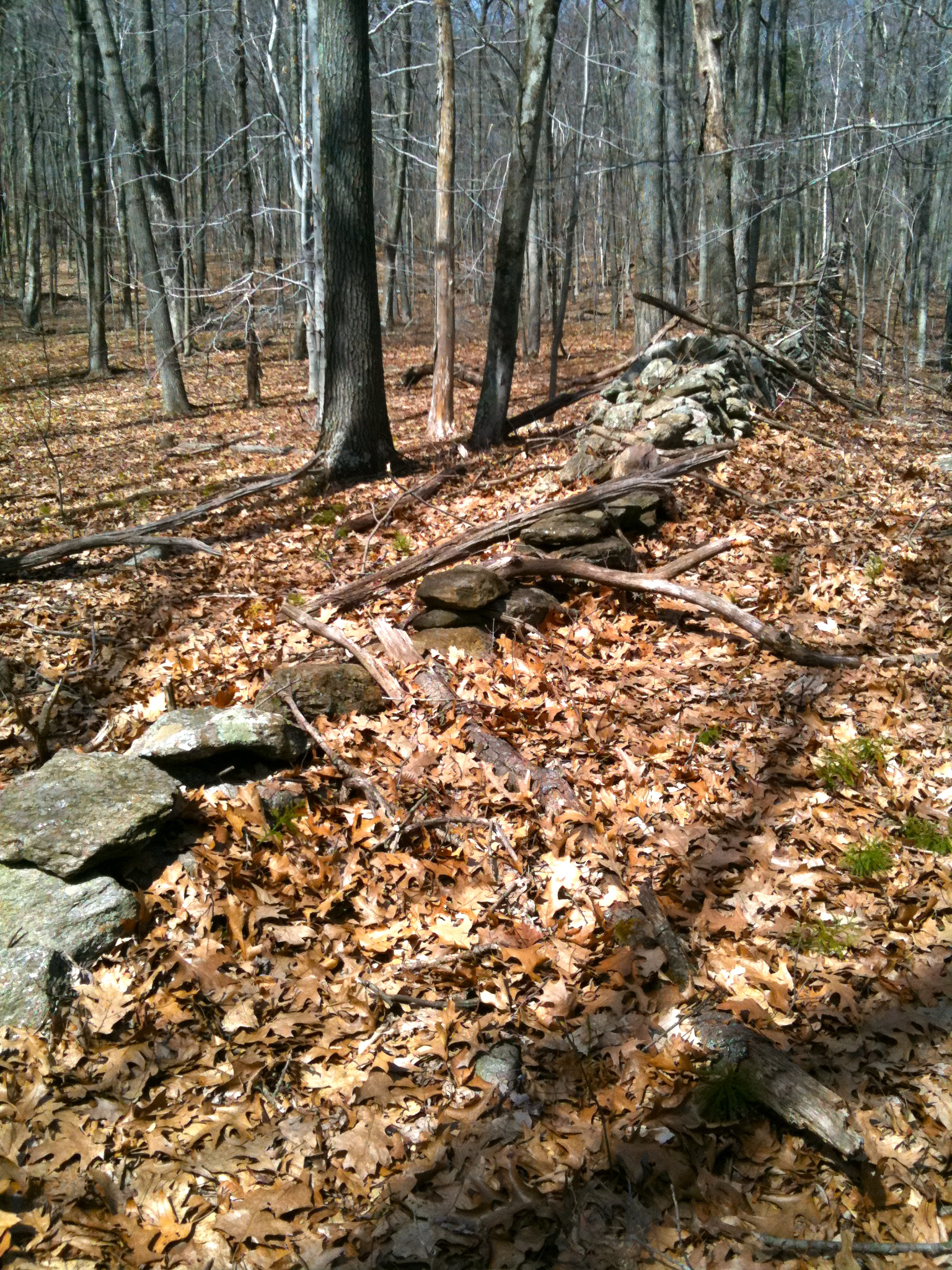
Old stone fences left by farmers cross and run alongside the Whittemore Trail in the Naugatuck State Forest

== Other local trails ==
There are local trails named the "Naugatuck Trail" in Bethany, Orange and Woodbridge Connecticut which are apparently vestiges of the original trail which extended south to New Haven Connecticut. Some of these can be found on the following individual maps:

- South Central Regional Council of Governments
- Bethany Farms
- Town of Orange Racebrook Tract
- Woodbridge Land Trust Fitzgerald Tract
- Woodbridge Land Trust Meadows
- Woodbridge Land Trust History Indian Trails
- Woodbridge Land Trust Race Brook Estates Blue Trail System

== See also ==
- Blue-Blazed Trails
