= Last Green Valley National Heritage Corridor =

New England scenery in northeastern Connecticut and Massachusetts

The Last Green Valley National Heritage Corridor
- Location within Connecticut Location within the United States
- Location: Connecticut / Massachusetts, USA
- Nearest city: Danielson
- Coordinates: 41°48′0″N 71°53′0″W
- Area: 707,000 acres (1,105 mi^{2})
- Established: November 2, 1994
- Governing body: The Last Green Valley, Inc

The Last Green Valley National Heritage Corridor is a federally designated National Heritage Corridor in northeastern Connecticut and portions of Massachusetts. It has a rural character with rolling hills, farmland and classic New England scenery. This area was designated because it is one of the last remaining stretches of green in the Boston to Washington, D.C. heavily urbanized corridor. The valley also has the largest stretch of dark night sky in the Northeast megalopolis corridor. It contains some of the largest unbroken forests in Southern New England, in a region of Connecticut known as the Quiet Corner.

== Geography ==
The corridor consists mostly of the Eastern New England Upland, transitioning to the coastal forests to the south and east. The rolling hills in the southern part of the Corridor become more rugged in the northern part of the corridor. The highest elevation is 1,315-foot (401 m) Burley Hill in Union, CT.

The corridor has a high concentration of state parks, state forests and other reserves, such as the Yale-Myers Forest, Pachaug State Forest, and the Norcross Wildlife Sanctuary. Of the area's over 700,000 acres (280,000 ha), over 77% is made up of forest and farms. The 35-town region is home to over 300,000 people. The Last Green Valley is half the size of Grand Canyon National Park and more than ten times that of Acadia National Park, New England's only national park.

The over 1,100 square miles of protected territory extend from the northernmost point of East Brookfield, Massachusetts to the southernmost point of Preston, Connecticut.

== History ==
Beginning in the 1980s, developmental pressures pushed citizens into creating organizations to protect lands, especially farmland from development. A report in 1988 by the National Park Service outlined solutions and it led to the creation of the Quinebaug and Shetucket Rivers Valley National Heritage Corridor in 1994. It was expanded in 1999 to include several communities in Massachusetts. In December 2014, Congress passed a law officially renaming the area the Last Green Valley National Heritage Corridor.

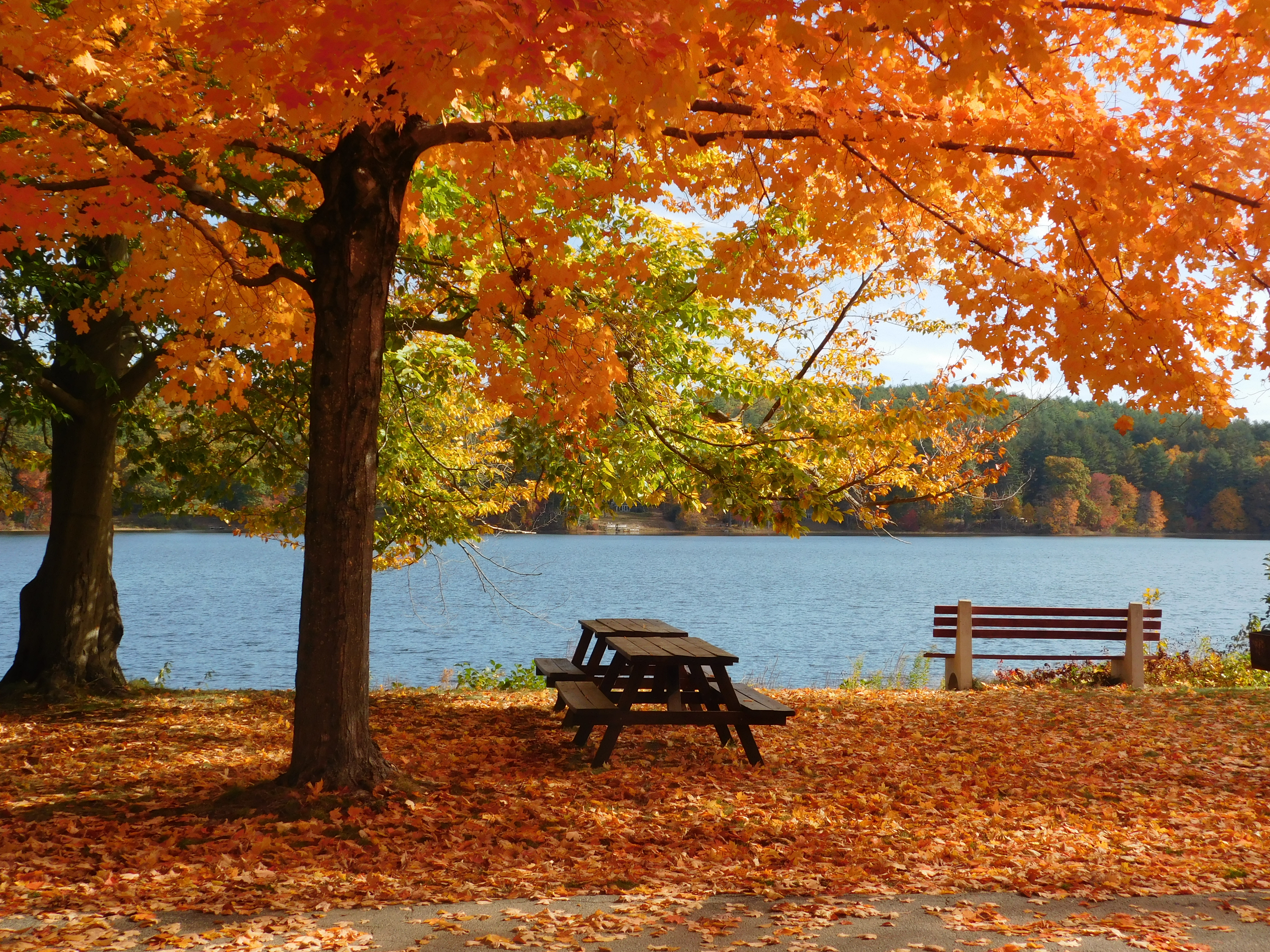

- Boston Hollow
- Bigelow Hollow State Park
- Chelsea Harbor, historic downtown Norwich, Connecticut
- Historic Norwichtown Green
- Leffingwell House Museum
- Pachaug-Great Meadow Swamp
- Uncas Leap Heritage Area, Norwich, Connecticut

== Recreation ==
- Air Line State Park Trail
- Beaver Brook State Park, Windham, Connecticut
- Bigelow Hollow State Park, Union, Connecticut
- Brimfield State Forest, Brimfield, Massachusetts
- Buffumville Lake, Oxford, Massachusetts
- East Brimfield Lake, Sturbridge, Massachusetts
- James L. Goodwin State Forest, Hampton, Connecticut
- Hodges Village Dam, Oxford, Massachusetts
- Hopeville Pond State Park, Griswold, Connecticut
- Killingly Pond State Park, Killingly, Connecticut
- Mansfield Hollow Lake, Mansfield, Connecticut
- Mansfield Hollow State Park, Mansfield, Connecticut
- Mashamoquet Brook State Park, Abington, Connecticut
- Mohegan Park, Norwich, Connecticut
- Mohegan State Forest, Scotland, Connecticut
- Mooween State Park, Lebanon, Connecticut
- Mountain Laurel Sanctuary, Union, Connecticut
- Natchaug State Forest, Eastford, Connecticut
- Nathan Hale State Forest, Coventry, Connecticut
- Nipmuck State Forest, Union, Connecticut
- Norcross Wildlife Sanctuary, Wales/Holland, Massachusetts
- Norwich (Chelsea) Harbor Water Trail, Norwich, Connecticut
- Old Furnace State Park, Killingly, Connecticut
- Pachaug State Forest, Sterling, Voluntown, Griswold and Plainfield, Connecticut
- Pomeroy State Park, Lebanon, Connecticut
- Quaddick State Park, Thompson, Connecticut
- Quinebaug Lake State Park, Killingly, Connecticut
- Ross Pond State Park, Killingly, Connecticut
- Streeter Point Recreation Area, Sturbridge, Massachusetts
- Yale-Myers Forest, Union, Connecticut
- Wells State Park, Sturbridge, Massachusetts
- West Thompson Lake, Thompson, Connecticut
- Westville Lake, Sturbridge, Massachusetts
