= Millers Pond State Park =

State park in Connecticut, United States

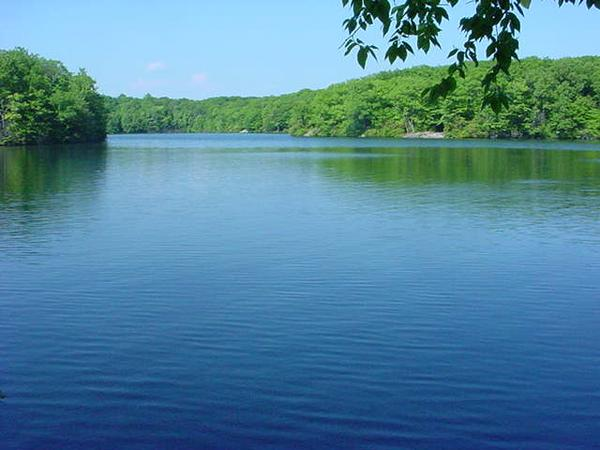

- Location within Connecticut Location within the United States
- Location: Durham and Haddam, Connecticut, United States
- Coordinates: 41°28′35″N 72°38′00″W
- Area: 280 acres (110 ha)
- Elevation: 564 ft (172 m)
- Established: 1955
- Administrator: Connecticut Department of Energy and Environmental Protection
- Designation: Connecticut state park
- Website: Official website

Millers Pond State Park is a public recreation area lying adjacent to Cockaponset State Forest in the towns of Durham and Haddam, Connecticut. The park's central feature is 33-acre (13 ha) Millers Pond, whose principal source of water is large springs that create a body of unpolluted water excellent for trout and smallmouth bass. The park offers fishing, hiking, mountain biking, and hunting.

== History ==
Thomas Miller erected the upper dam in 1704 to make a reservoir to serve his downstream gristmill. Millers Pond and 170 acres of woodlands were acquired by the state in 1955 from the heirs of Thomas Macdonough Russell. The acquisition was one of several made in the 1950s using funds bequeathed by George Dudley Seymour. (Note: The Seymour bequest contributed to the creation of Beaver Brook State Park, Becket Hill State Park Reserve, Bigelow Hollow State Park, Hurd State Park, Millers Pond State Park, Platt Hill State Park, George Dudley Seymour State Park, Stoddard Hill State Park, and Nathan Hale State Forest.) The state's purchase of additional land around the pond was completed in 1972.
