= List of Connecticut state parks =

Connecticut’s 106 State Parks

This is a list of state parks, reserves, forests and wildlife management areas (WMAs) in the Connecticut state park and forest system, shown in five tables. The first table lists state parks and reserves, the second lists state park trails, the third lists state forests, the fourth lists wildlife management areas (WMAs) and the fifth lists other state-owned, recreation-related areas. It is possible to faintly view the Milky Way in 10 state parks.

== State parks ==
Name	Town	County	Area		Estab- lished	River / lake / other	Image	Remarks
Name	Town	County	acres	ha	Estab- lished	River / lake / other	Image	Remarks
Above All State Park	Warren	Litchfield	31	13	1927		Graffiti on cinderblock building	Undeveloped site with Cold War defense installation remnants
Auerfarm State Park Scenic Reserve	Bloomfield	Hartford	40	16	2015		Auerfarm Scenic Reserve	Farmland gifted to state
Beaver Brook State Park	Chaplin, Windham	Windham	401	162	1955	Bibbins Pond	Pond and spillway	Fishing; abuts Air Line State Park Trail
Becket Hill State Park Reserve	Lyme	New London	260	110	1961	Uncas Pond	Pond	Adjacent to Nehantic State Forest
Beckley Furnace Industrial Monument	North Canaan	Litchfield	12	4.9	1946		An antique stone furnace tower	Historic iron-making furnace dating from 1847
Bennett's Pond State Park	Ridgefield, Danbury	Fairfield	460	190	2002		Creek	Former estate and nursery called Outpost Farm
Bigelow Hollow State Park	Union	Tolland	516	209	1949	Bigelow Pond, Mashapaug Lake	Pond mirroring green trees	Adjoins Nipmuck State Forest and borders Mashapaug Lake; boat launch, swimming
Black Rock State Park	Watertown	Litchfield	444	180	1926	Black Rock Pond	Landscape with cloud-flecked sky	Camping, pond fishing, Mattatuck Trail
Bluff Point State Park	Groton	New London	806	326	1963	Long Island Sound	Land and sea	Ocean access, boat launch; near Haley Farm State Park
Bolton Notch State Park	Bolton	Tolland	95	38	1918			Rock climbing
Brainard Homestead State Park	East Haddam	Middlesex	25	10	1929		Field	Undeveloped
Burr Pond State Park	Torrington	Litchfield	438	177	1949	Burr Pond	Picnic table with pond	Boating, fishing, swimming
Camp Columbia State Park/State Forest	Morris	Litchfield	600	240	2000			Former rural campus of Columbia University Engineering Department
Campbell Falls State Park Reserve	Norfolk	Litchfield	102	41	1923	Whiting River	Waterfall	On the Massachusetts border
Chatfield Hollow State Park	Killingworth	Middlesex	412	167	1949		Boardwalk disappearing into foliage	Swimming, fishing
Collis P. Huntington State Park	Redding, Newtown, Bethel	Fairfield	878	355	1973		Standing bear statue	Former estate with ponds for fishing and canoeing and multipurpose trails
Connecticut Valley Railroad State Park	Essex	Middlesex	136	55	1969		Steam train with steam	Essex Steam Train from Essex to Chester up the Connecticut River valley
Dart Island State Park	Middletown	Middlesex	19	7.7	1918	Connecticut River	Waterway	Accessible by water only
Day Pond State Park	Colchester	New London	180	73	1949	Day Pond	Pond	Swimming, pond fishing
Dennis Hill State Park	Norfolk	Litchfield	240	97	1935		Lookout pavilion	Former estate with hiking, picnicking and scenic views
Devil's Hopyard State Park	East Haddam	Middlesex	860	350	1919	Eightmile River	Waterfall over brown rocks	Historic millsite with camping, stream fishing, waterfall
Dinosaur State Park	Rocky Hill	Hartford	60	24	1968		Geodesic dome through pines	Natural history museum, arboretum
Eagle Landing State Park	Haddam	Middlesex	16	6.5	2003	Connecticut River		Boat dock, fishing pier, winter eagle viewing
Farm River State Park	East Haven	New Haven	61	25	1998	Farm River	Docks in fog	Boat launch, fishing
Ferry Landing State Park	Old Lyme	New London	1	0.40	Unknown	Connecticut River		Boat launch, fishing, Crabbing
Fort Griswold Battlefield State Park	Groton	New London	16	6.5	1953	Thames River	Landscape with river	Site of the 1781 massacre led by Benedict Arnold; American Revolutionary War museum and artifacts
Fort Trumbull State Park	New London	New London	16	6.5	2000	Long Island Sound	Landscape with stone fort	19th-century fort with museum, fishing pier
Gardner Lake State Park	Salem	New London	10	4.0	2001	Gardner Lake		Boating, fishing, swimming
Gay City State Park	Hebron	Tolland	1,569	635	1944	Blackledge River	Sun-dappled stone formation	Former mill-town ruins; pond fishing, swimming, youth group camping; bordered by Meshomasic State Forest
George Dudley Seymour State Park	Haddam	Middlesex	222	90	1960	Connecticut River		Abuts Hurd State Park and Higganum Meadows Wildlife Area; fishing, hunting
George Waldo State Park	Southbury	New Haven	150	61	1960	Lake Lillinonah		Undeveloped; multi-use trails
Gillette Castle State Park	East Haddam	Middlesex	184	74	1943	Connecticut River	Castle-like structure against blue sky	Castle house museum; boat camping
Haddam Island State Park	Haddam	Middlesex	14	5.7	1944	Connecticut River		Accessible only by boat
Haddam Meadows State Park	Haddam	Middlesex	175	71	1944	Connecticut River		Boating, fishing
Haley Farm State Park	Groton	New London	198	80	1970		Mountain biker on the crushed stone bike near the turn to Groton's X-Town Trail and Gibson Pond in Haley Farm State Park	Bike trail, near Bluff Point State Park
Hammonasset Beach State Park	Madison	New Haven	919	372	1920		Sun setting over ocean waters	Beach, swimming, fishing, camping, nature center, carry-in boating
Harkness Memorial State Park	Waterford	New London	116	47	1952	Long Island Sound	Estate grounds in aerial view	42-room mansion museum, formal gardens, fishing
Haystack Mountain State Park	Norfolk	Litchfield	292	118	1917		Observation tower	Observation tower
Higganum Reservoir State Park	Haddam	Middlesex	147	59	1955	Higganum Reservoir	Higganum Reservoir	Car-top boating, fishing, hunting
Hopemead State Park	Bozrah, Montville	New London	70	28	1954	Gardner Lake		Fishing, hiking
Hopeville Pond State Park	Griswold	New London	544	220	1938	Pachaug River		Camping, boating, swimming, pond fishing, field sports
Horse Guard State Park	Avon	Hartford	105	42	1964			Undeveloped
Housatonic Meadows State Park	Sharon	Litchfield	451	183	1927	Housatonic River	Vista with fall foliage	Camping, canoeing, fly fishing
Humaston Brook State Park	Litchfield	Litchfield	141	57	1920			Fishing
Hurd State Park	East Hampton	Middlesex	991	401	1914	Connecticut River	Connecticut River view	Boat camping, mountain biking, scenic views
Indian Well State Park	Shelton	Fairfield	153	62	1928	Lake Housatonic	Boat launch at sunset	Boating, swimming, fishing, waterfalls
John A. Minetto State Park	Torrington	Litchfield	715	289	1965			Pond and stream fishing, cross-country skiing
Kent Falls State Park	Kent	Litchfield	307	124	1919	Falls Brook	Waterfalls with people in foreground	Waterfalls, replica covered bridge
Kettletown State Park	Southbury	New Haven	599	242	1950	Lake Zoar	BBHTKettletownMillerTrail	Camping, swimming, fishing
Killingly Pond State Park	Killingly	Windham	162	66		Killingly Pond		Boating, fishing
Lake Waramaug State Park	Kent	Litchfield	95	38	1920	Lake Waramaug		Camping, car-top boating, swimming, fishing
Lamentation Mountain State Park	Berlin	Hartford	47	19	1936		Vista with greenery	Hiking, scenic vistas
Lovers Leap State Park	New Milford	Litchfield	127	51	1971	Housatonic River	River vista	Scenic river vistas
Macedonia Brook State Park	Kent	Litchfield	2,300	930	1918		Mountain vista	Camping, stream fishing
Machimoodus State Park	East Haddam	Middlesex	300	120	1998	Salmon River		Fishing, horseback riding
Mansfield Hollow State Park	Mansfield	Tolland	251	102	1952	Mansfield Hollow Lake	Lake and dam aerial view	Boating, fishing, field sports, mountain biking, cross-country skiing
Mashamoquet Brook State Park	Pomfret	Windham	917	371	1924		Leafy park roadway	Camping, swimming, stream fishing
Mianus River State Park	Stamford	Fairfield	94	38	2001	Mianus River	River view with rocks and trees	Biking, fishing, horseback riding
Millers Pond State Park	Durham, Haddam	Middlesex	280	110	1955	Millers Pond	Tranquil blue pond	Fishing, hunting, mountain biking
Minnie Island State Park	Salem, Montville	New London	1	0.40	1925	Gardner Lake		Boating, fishing, accessible only by boat
Mohawk Forest/Mohawk Mountain State Park	Cornwall, Goshen, Litchfield	Litchfield	4,016	1,625	1921		Mountain vista	Includes Mohawk Mountain Ski Area
Mono Pond State Park Reserve	Columbia	Tolland	218	88	2008	Mono Pond	Mono Pond	Boating, fishing, hunting, cross-country skiing
Mooween State Park	Lebanon	New London	577	234	1989	Red Cedar Lake		Boating, fishing
Mount Bushnell State Park	Washington	Litchfield	214	87	1916			Hiking
Mount Riga State Park	Salisbury	Litchfield	276	112	1954		Connecticut-Massachusetts state line boundary marker in Sages Ravine near Connecticut Route 41 and Mount Riga State Park	Hiking
Mount Tom State Park	Litchfield, Washington, Morris	Litchfield	231	93	1915	Mount Tom Pond	Rough-hewn stone tower	Historic lookout tower
Nathaniel Lyon Memorial State Park	Eastford	Windham			1920			Located in Natchaug State Forest
Old Furnace State Park	Killingly	Windham	367	149	1918	Ross Pond	Brook and wetlands	Site of an 18th-century iron furnace; hiking, boating, fishing, hunting
Osbornedale State Park	Derby	New Haven	350	140	1956		Glacial erratic	Former Osbornedale Farms; hiking, pond fishing
Penwood State Park	Bloomfield	Hartford	787	318	1944	Lake Louise	Kettle bog waters	Metacomet Trail, hiking, cross-country skiing
Platt Hill State Park	Winchester	Litchfield	159	64	1960		Field and sky	Scenic vistas
Pomeroy State Park	Lebanon	New London	200	81	1953			Undeveloped; hiking, hunting
Putnam Memorial State Park	Bethel, Redding	Fairfield	183	74	1887	Lake MdDougall	Entry gate	American Revolutionary War museum, interpretive trail, youth group camping
Quaddick State Park	Thompson	Windham	116	47	1951	Quaddick Reservoir		Boat launch, swimming, fishing, field sports
Quinebaug Lake State Park	Killingly	Windham	181	73	1964	Quinebaug Lake		Boating, fishing
Quinnipiac River State Park	North Haven	New Haven	323	131	1951	Quinnipiac River		Car-top boating, fishing, hunting
River Highlands State Park	Cromwell	Middlesex	177	72	2001	Connecticut River	River view	Boat camping
Rocky Glen State Park	Newtown	Fairfield	46	19	1943	Pootatuck River		Hiking
Rocky Neck State Park	East Lyme	New London	710	290	1931	Long Island Sound	Long pavilion	Beach, swimming, camping, saltwater fishing
Ross Pond State Park	Killingly	Windham	314	127	1964	Ross Pond		Boating, fishing, hunting
Salt Rock State Campground	Sprague	New London	149	60	2001	Shetucket River		Camping, fishing, pool swimming, access to Shetucket River
Satan's Kingdom State Recreation Area	New Hartford	Litchfield	1	0.40	2012	Farmington River	Park sign	Canoeing, kayaking, tubing
Scantic River State Park	Enfield, East Windsor, Somers	Hartford	784	317	1967	Scantic River		Fishing, hunting
Selden Neck State Park	Lyme	New London	607	246	1917	Connecticut River		Accessible only by boat; camping, fishing, hunting
Seth Low Pierrepont State Park Reserve	Ridgefield	Fairfield	305	123	1956	Lake Naraneka	Park sign	Car-top boating, fishing
Seaside State Park	Waterford	New London	36	15	2014	Long Island Sound		Sanatorium remains, fishing
Sherwood Island State Park	Westport	Fairfield	238	96	1932	Long Island Sound	Beachscape	Beach, swimming, nature center, field sports, saltwater fishing
Silver Sands State Park	Milford	New Haven	297	120	1960	Long Island Sound	Beach, tombolo and island	Beach, swimming, saltwater fishing
Sleeping Giant State Park	Hamden	New Haven	1,439	582	1924		Stone lookout tower	Quinnipiac Trail, lookout tower, stream fishing, youth group camping
Southford Falls State Park	Oxford	New Haven	126	51	1932	Eightmile Brook	Covered bridge	Waterfalls, covered bridge, pond and stream fishing, cross-country skiing, field sports
Squantz Pond State Park	New Fairfield	Fairfield	172	70	1926	Squantz Pond	Pond waters	Boating, swimming, pond fishing, scuba diving
Stillwater Pond State Park	Torrington	Litchfield	226	91		Stillwater Pond		Boating, fishing
Stoddard Hill State Park	Ledyard	New London	55	22	1954	Thames River		Boating, fishing
Stratton Brook State Park	Simsbury	Hartford	145	59	1949	Stratton Brook	Covered bridge	Swimming, fishing, biking, cross-country skiing
Sunnybrook State Park	Torrington	Litchfield	464	188	1970	Naugatuck River		Fishing, hunting
Sunrise State Park	East Haddam	Middlesex	143	58	2009	Salmon River		Undeveloped
Talcott Mountain State Park	Simsbury, Avon, Bloomfield	Hartford	574	232	1965		Tower	Observation tower, scenic vistas, Metacomet Trail
Tri-Mountain State Park	Durham, Wallingford	Middlesex, New Haven	157	64	1925			Hiking
Trout Brook Valley State Park Reserve	Easton	Fairfield	300	120	1999		Hiking trail signage	Hiking
Wadsworth Falls State Park	Middlefield, Middletown	Middlesex	285	115	1942	Coginchaug River	Waterfall	Waterfall, swimming, stream fishing, mountain biking
West Rock Ridge State Park	Hamden, New Haven, Woodbridge, Bethany	New Haven	1,691	684	1975	Lake Wintergreen	Landscape vista	Features the Regicides Trail, scenic vistas, fishing, car-top boating, horseback riding
Wharton Brook State Park	Wallingford, North Haven	New Haven	96	39	1918	Allen Brook Pond	Allen Brook Pond in Wharton Brook SP at dusk.	Fishing, swimming
Whittemore Glen State Park	Naugatuck, Middlebury	New Haven	242	98	1945		The Larkin Trail in Whittemore Glen State Park in Naugatuck Connecticut.	Horseback riding, hiking
Windsor Meadows State Park	Windsor	Hartford	155	63	1968	Connecticut River		Boat launch, fishing, bicycling
Wooster Mountain State Park	Danbury	Fairfield	444	180	1920		Forest trail	Skeet, trap and target shooting, hunting

== State park trails ==
Name	Towns	Counties	Length		Estab- lished	Image	Remarks
Name	Towns	Counties	mi	km	Estab- lished	Image	Remarks
Air Line State Park Trail	East Hampton, Colchester, Hebron, Columbia, Lebanon, Windham, Chaplin, Hampton, Pomfret, Putnam, Thompson	Middlesex, New London, Tolland, Windham	50	80	1969	A trail intersection with bare trees and dead leaves.	Nearly fifty miles of converted rail-trail
Farmington Canal State Park Trail	Cheshire, Hamden	New Haven	5.5	8.9		Stone canal lock	Part of the Farmington Canal Trail
Hop River State Park Trail	Andover, Bolton, Columbia, Coventry, Manchester, Vernon	Hartford, Tolland	19	31		Tunnel opening onto trees and dog-walker	Nineteen miles of rail-trail from Manchester to Willimantic
Larkin State Park Trail	Southbury, Oxford, Middlebury, Naugatuck	New Haven	10	16	1943	LarkinStateParkTrail-MiddleburyCT	Ten-mile-long rail-trail
Moosup Valley State Park Trail	Plainfield, Sterling	Windham	6	9.7	1987	River view	Six miles of rail-trail
Windsor Locks Canal State Park Trail	Windsor Locks, Suffield	Hartford	4.5	7.2		Windsor Locks Canal Trail Suffield North Trailhead Looking South	4.5 mile bike trail, fishing along the canal

== State forests ==
Name	Town	County	Area		Estab- lished	River / lake / other	Image	Remarks
Name	Town	County	acres	ha	Estab- lished	River / lake / other	Image	Remarks
Algonquin State Forest	Colebrook, Winchester	Litchfield	2,987	1,209	1937	Sandy Brook		Hiking, hunting, fishing, bird watching
American Legion State Forest	Barkhamsted	Litchfield	893	361	1927	Farmington River	Forest with foundation stones in winter	Adjacent to Peoples State Forest; hiking, camping, boating, nature center
Camp Columbia State Park/State Forest	Morris	Litchfield	601	243	2000		Camp Columbia State Park Class Of 1906 Tower	Historic college campus; hiking, hunting
Centennial Watershed State Forest	Redding, Easton, Newtown, Weston	Fairfield	15,370	6,220	2002	Saugatuck Reservoir	Saugatuck Reservoir from the Saugatuck Trail in Centennial Watershed State Forest	Hiking, hunting, fishing
Cockaponset State Forest	Haddam	Middlesex	17,186	6,955	1926	Pattaconk Lake	Forested trail in winter	Swimming, fishing, trails
Enders State Forest	Granby	Hartford	2,105	852	1970		Ender Falls	Hiking, hunting
Housatonic State Forest	Sharon	Litchfield	10,894	4,409	1927		Iron Trail In Housatonic SF to Canaan Mtn Rd	Appalachian Trail
James L. Goodwin State Forest	Hampton	Middlesex	2,003	811	1964	Pine Acres Pond	James Goodwin State Forest Pine Acres Lake Observation Deck at Boat Launch	Air Line State Park Trail, boat launch, Conservation Education Center, youth group camping, Natchaug Trail
Massacoe State Forest	Simsbury	Hartford	503	204	1908	Great Pond		Bike trail
Mattatuck State Forest	Waterbury, Plymouth, Thomaston, Watertown, Litchfield, Harwinton	Litchfield	4,673	1,891	1925		Forested landscape	Twenty different parcels; Hancock Brook Trail, Whitestone Cliffs Trail
Meshomasic State Forest	East Hampton	Middlesex	9,026	3,653	1903		Landscape with river bends	Fishing, hiking, hunting
Mohawk State Forest	Cornwall, Goshen	Litchfield	3,743	1,515	1921	Mohawk Pond	Mountain vista	Adjoins Mohawk Mountain State Park; lookout tower, pond and stream fishing, youth group camping, skiing
Mohegan State Forest	Scotland	Middlesex	956	387	1960			Hiking, hunting
Nassahegon State Forest	Burlington	Hartford	1,227	497	1942		Tunxis "White-Dot" Blue-Blazed hiking trail near Bradley Brook and CT Route 4 in Nassahegon State Forest (Burlington, Connecticut)	Fish hatchery; hunting, hiking, bird watching
Natchaug State Forest	Eastford	Windham	13,438	5,438	1917	Natchaug River	Forested brook	Natchaug Trail; hiking, horseback riding, camping
Nathan Hale State Forest	Andover	Tolland	1,455	589	1946		Nathan Hale State Forest road	Hiking, hunting
Naugatuck State Forest	Cheshire, Hamden, Naugatuck, Oxford, Beacon Falls	New Haven	4,153	1,681	1921	Naugatuck River	Mountain vista with highway	Includes the Naugatuck Trail
Nehantic State Forest	Lyme	New London	5,062	2,049	1925	Norwich Pond, Uncas Lake		Boating, swimming, hiking
Nepaug State Forest	New Hartford	Litchfield	1,373	556	1927			Hiking, biking, fishing, camping
Nipmuck State Forest	Union	Tolland	9,209	3,727	1905	Breakneck Pond	Frozen pond	Adjoins Bigelow Hollow State Park, features Mountain Laurel Sanctuary, Nipmuck Trail
Nye-Holman State Forest	Tolland	Tolland	787	318	1931	Willimantic River		Fishing, hiking, youth group camping
Pachaug State Forest	Voluntown, Griswold, Plainfield, Sterling, North Stonington, Preston	New London	28,804	11,657	1928	Pachaug River	Forested boardwalk	Camping, boating, horseback riding, youth group camping, motorcycle trail
Paugnut State Forest	Torrington, Winchester	Litchfield	1,644	665	1929		Paugnut State Forest's hills in autumn viewed from the north-east shore of Burr Pond	Spread out over four locations; abuts Burr Pond and Sunnybrook state parks
Paugussett State Forest	Newtown	Fairfield	1,947	788		Housatonic River	LillinonahTrail PondBrookInlet	Boat launch, fishing, hiking, mountain biking
Peoples State Forest	Barkhamsted	Litchfield	3,059	1,238	1924	Farmington River		Adjacent to American Legion State Forest; Barkhamsted Lighthouse
Pootatuck State Forest	New Fairfield	Fairfield	1,103	446		Squantz Pond	Squantz Pond and Candlewood Lake from scenic outlook on Pootatuck State Forest Blue Trail	Access is through Squantz Pond State Park
Quaddick State Forest	Thompson	Windham	1,109	449		Quaddick Reservoir		Youth group camping
Salmon River State Forest	Hebron, Marlborough, Colchester, East Haddam, East Hampton	Middlesex, New London	6,905	2,794	1934	Salmon River	Winter forest vista with river	Features Comstock's Bridge
Shenipsit State Forest	Stafford, Somers, Ellington	Tolland	6,962	2,817	1927		Forest vista with rising mist	Features 11 parcels spread over nearly 7,000 acres, Shenipsit Trail, Civilian Conservation Corps Museum
Topsmead State Forest	Litchfield	Litchfield	615	249	1972			Features historic house museum estate of Edith Morton Chase
Tunxis State Forest	East Hartland, Granby	Hartford	5,519	2,233	1923	Barkhamsted Reservoir	Massachusetts-Connecticut border marker on northern border of Tunxis State Forest in Hartland (near northern end of Pell Road	Meets Granville State Forest in Massachusetts
Wyantenock State Forest	Cornwall, Kent, Warren	Litchfield	4,083	1,652	1925			Nine different parcels, none developed for recreation

== Wildlife management areas ==
Name	Town	County	Area		Established	River / lake / other	Image	Remarks
Name	Town	County	acres	ha	Established	River / lake / other	Image	Remarks
Aldo Leopold Wildlife Management Area	Southbury	New Haven	554	224		Housatonic River, Lake Lillinonah		Forest. Limited off-road parking available on Kuhne, Purchase Brook, Little York and East Flat Hill roads.
Assekonk Swamp Wildlife Management Area	North Stonington	New London	963	280		Assekonk Swamp		Swamp. Limited off-road parking available off CT-184.
Babcock Pond Wildlife Management Area	East Haddam, Colchester	Middlesex, New London	1524	617		Babcock Pond		Swamp, forest, pond. Parking off Myles Standish Road,
Barber Pond Wildlife Management Area	Bloomfield, Windsor	Hartford	72	29		Barber Pond		Wetlands. Access via CT-305 (Old Windsor Road).
Barn Island Wildlife Management Area	Stonington	New London	1013	410		Little Narragansett Bay		Marshes. Parking at the Barn Island Boat Launch and South East Parking.
Bartlett Brook Wildlife Management Area	Lebanon	New London	687	278		Bartlett Brook and Exeter Brook.		Streams. Stone foundations. Fields. Trails.
Bear Hill Wildlife Management Area	Bozrah	New London	364	147				
Belding Wildlife Management Area	Vernon	Tolland	282	114				
Bishops Swamp Wildlife Management Area	Andover, Hebron	Tolland	719	291				
Black Pond Wildlife Management Area	Middlefield, Meriden	Middlesex, New Haven	68	28				
Candlewood Hill Wildlife Management Area	Groton	New London	201	81				Swamps, streams, forest, glacial erratics, quarries and 44 acre pitch pine grove.
Cedar Swamp Wildlife Management Area	New Hartford, Torrington	Litchfield	275	111				
Charles E. Wheeler Wildlife Management Area	Milford	New Haven	625	253	1955	Housatonic River, Long Island Sound	Swans at high tide in Charles E. Wheeler WMA	
Charter Marsh Wildlife Sanctuary	Tolland	Tolland	240	97		Skungamaug Marsh (lake) and Skungamaug River.		Marsh, River, Pond.
Cromwell Meadows Wildlife Management Area	Cromwell, Middletown	Middlesex	496	201				
Durham Meadows Wildlife Management Area								
East River Marsh Wildlife Management Area								
East Swamp Wildlife Management Area								
Eightmile River Wildlife Management Area								
Franklin Wildlife Management Area	North Franklin	New London						website
Goshen Wildlife Management Area								
Great Harbor Wildlife Management Area								
Higganum Meadows Wildlife Management Area								
Housatonic River Wildlife Management Area								
King's Island Coop Wildlife Management Area								
Kollar Wildlife Management Area								
Larson Lot Wildlife Management Area								
Little River Fish and Wildlife Area								
Lord's Cove Wildlife Management Area								
Maromas Coop Wildlife Management Area								
Meadow Brook Wildlife Management Area								
Menunketesuck Wildlife Management Area								
Messerschmidt Wildlife Management Area								
Newgate Wildlife Management Area								
Nod Brook Wildlife Management Area								
Nott Island Wildlife Management Area								
Pease Brook Wildlife Management Area								
Plum Bank Wildlife Management Area								
Quinebaug River Wildlife Management Area								
Quinnipiac River Marsh Wildlife Management Area								
Ragged Rock Wildlife Management Area								
Raymond Brook Marsh Wildlife Management Area								
Robbins Swamp Wildlife Management Area								
Roger Tory Peterson Wildlife Area								
Roraback Wildlife Management Area	Harwinton	Litchfield	1976	800		Leadmine Brook		Fields, Swamps, Ponds.
Rose Hill Wildlife Management Area								
Ross Marsh Wildlife Management Area								
Salmon River Cove and Haddam Neck Wildlife Management Area								
Sessions Woods Wildlife Management Area	Burlington	Hartford					Sessions Woods Wildlife Management Area Tree ID Trail	website, includes the Sessions Woods Conservation Education Center with an exhibit area and a meeting room, interpretive trails, habitat management demonstration areas, and a backyard wildlife habitat area, Friends site, Town of Burlington information
Simsbury Wildlife Management Area								
Skiff Mountain Coop Wildlife Management Area								
James V. Spignesi Wildlife Management Area								
Stanley Works Wildlife Management Area								
Suffield Wildlife Management Area								
Talbot Wildlife Management Area								
Tankerhoosen Wildlife Management Area								
Wangunk Meadows Wildlife Management Area								
Wopowog Wildlife Management Area								
Zemko Pond Wildlife Management Area								

== Other state areas ==
Name	Town	County	Established	Remarks
Burlington Trout Hatchery	Burlington	Hartford	1923	website, information, located within Nassahegon State Forest
Quinebaug Valley Trout Hatchery	Plainfield	Windham		website, information

== See also ==
- List of national forests of the United States
