= Platt Hill State Park =

State park in Litchfield County, Connecticut

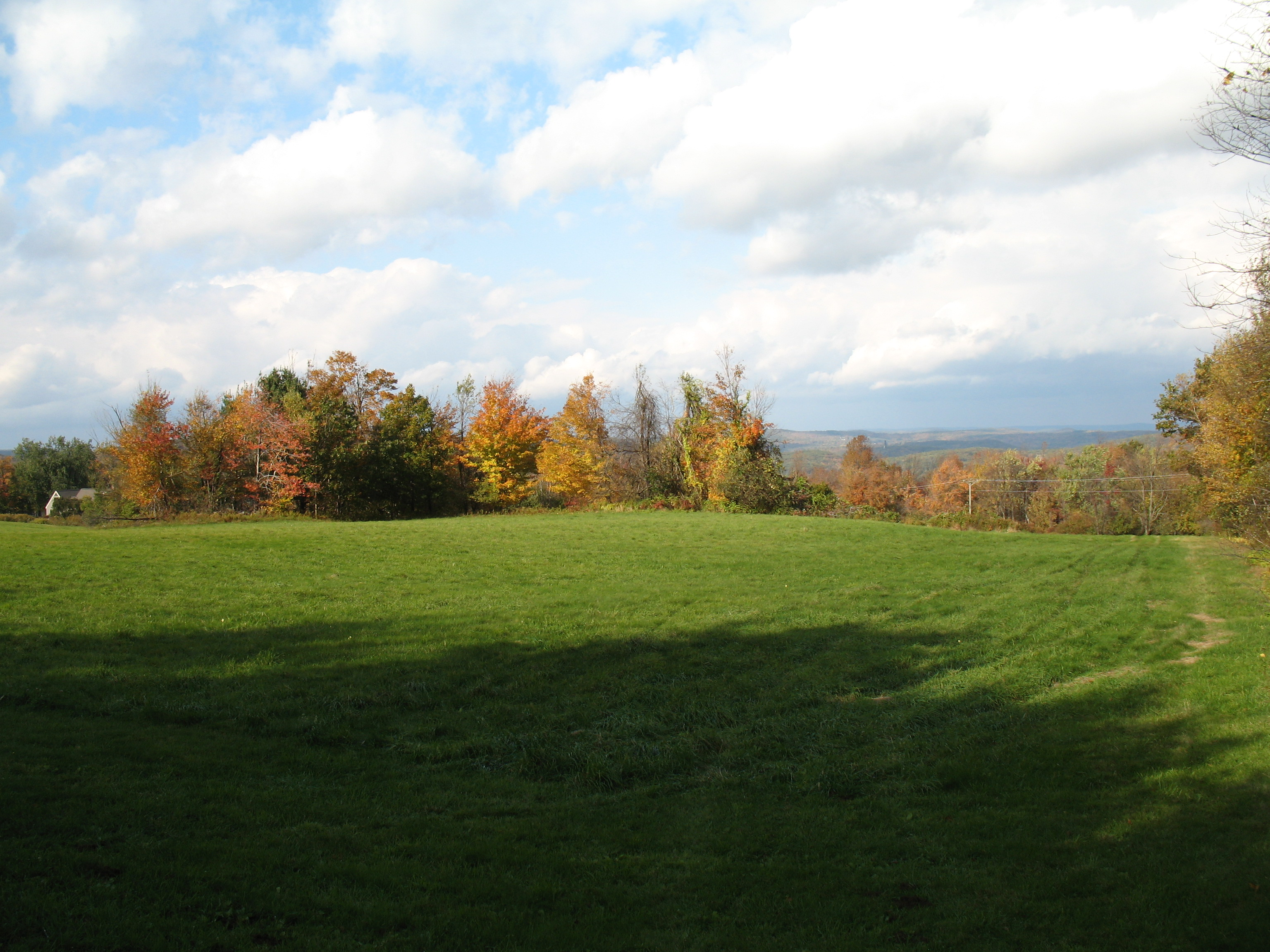

- Location within Connecticut Location within the United States
- Location: Winchester, Connecticut, United States
- Coordinates: 41°54′00″N 73°06′25″W
- Area: 159 acres (64 ha)
- Elevation: 1,299 ft (396 m)
- Established: 1960
- Administrator: Connecticut Department of Energy and Environmental Protection
- Designation: Connecticut state park
- Website: Official website

Platt Hill State Park is an undeveloped public recreation area occupying 159 acres (64 ha) in the town of Winchester, Connecticut. The state park has hiking trails, picnicking sites, and views of the surrounding area.

== History ==
The park was one of several public recreation areas acquired in the 1950s using funds bequeathed for that purpose by George Dudley Seymour. Platt Hill State Park first appeared on state rolls in the 1960 edition of the Connecticut State Register and Manual, where it was listed at 50 acres (20 ha). (Note: In addition to Platt Hill, Seymour's legacy contributed to the creation of Beaver Brook State Park, Becket Hill State Park Reserve, Bigelow Hollow State Park, Hurd State Park, Millers Pond State Park, George Dudley Seymour State Park, Stoddard Hill State Park, and Nathan Hale State Forest.)
