= Bennett's Pond State Park =

State park in Fairfield County, Connecticut

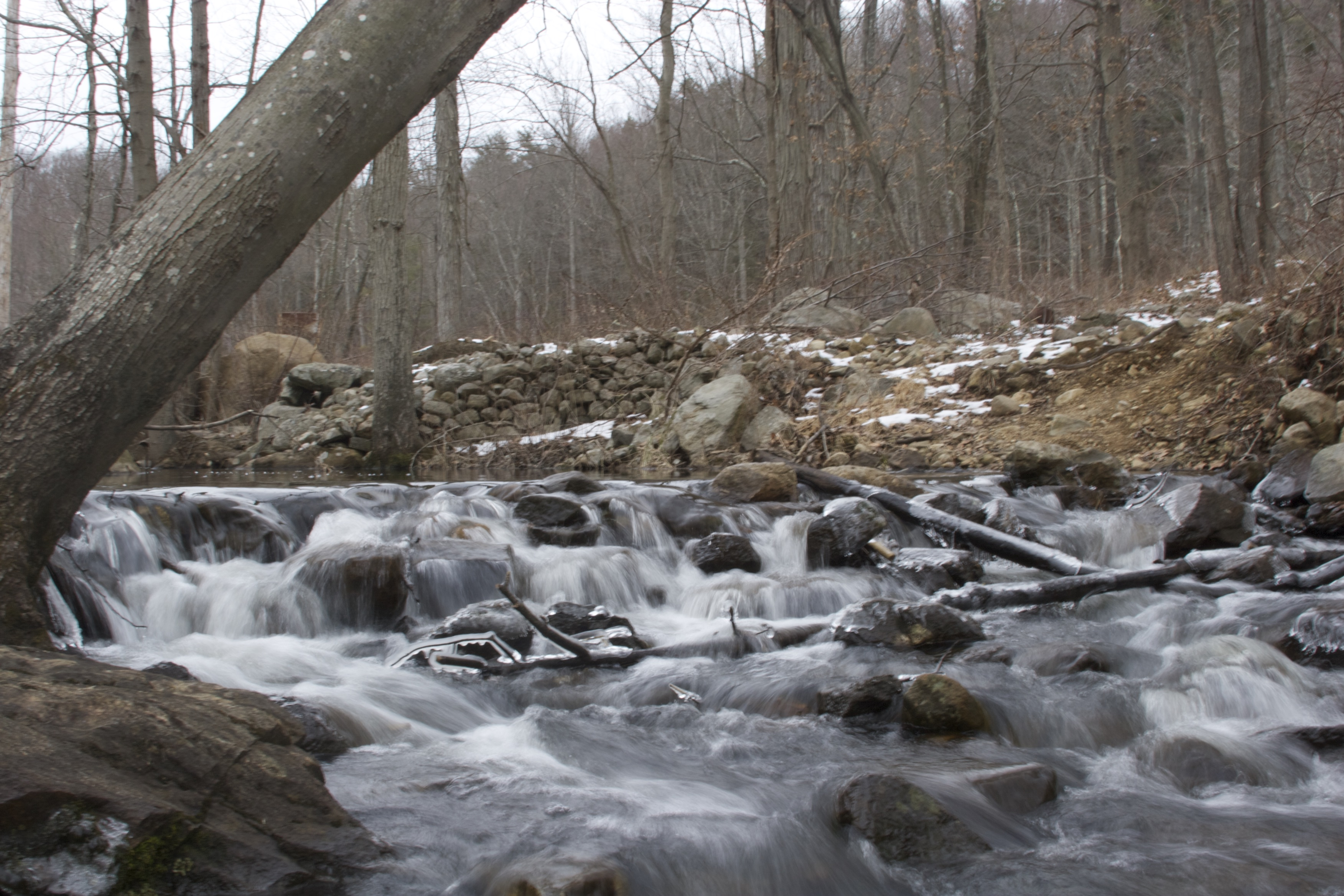
- Stream from Bennett's Pond in winter

- Location within Connecticut Location within the United States
- Location: Ridgefield, Connecticut, United States
- Coordinates: 41°20′25″N 73°28′55″W
- Area: 460 acres (190 ha)
- Elevation: 525 ft (160 m)
- Designation: Connecticut state park
- Established: 2002
- Administrator: Connecticut Department of Energy and Environmental Protection
- Website: Bennett's Pond State Park

Bennett's Pond State Park is a public recreation area located in the town of Ridgefield, Connecticut. The state park occupies a portion of the estate once owned by industrialist Louis D. Conley. The park features the 56-acre pond for which it is named and many miles of hiking trails in a pristine woodland environment. It is contiguous with Wooster Mountain State Park and is crossed by the Ives Trail. In addition to hiking, the park offers fishing, biking, and seasonal bow hunting. It is managed by the Connecticut Department of Energy and Environmental Protection.

== History ==
In 1914, tinfoil magnate and arboreal philanthropist Louis D. Conley (1874-1930) retired to Connecticut and the 1500-acre estate that he called Outpost Farm. Among other improvements on the estate grounds, Conley initiated the creation of what would become one of the leading nurseries on the East Coast of the United States. After Conley's death from meningitis at the age of 56, nursery operations continued for another 15 years. Examples of the tree species nurtured here can be found throughout the park, though most other signs of the estate have disappeared.

In the 1970s, the estate passed into the hands of computer giant IBM, which razed Conley's 34-room mansion in 1974 and sold a large portion of the land to a commercial developer, Eureka V LLC, in 1997. Local opposition to the developer's plans for a golf course, hotels, conference centers and condominiums resulted in protracted legal maneuvering that ended with the town acquiring 458 acres from Eureka through eminent domain in 2001. With the assistance of a two-million-dollar grant from the Land and Water Conservation Fund, the state subsequently purchased the land from the town, creating Bennett’s Pond State Park in 2002.
