= Above All =

Above All may refer to:

- Above All (Mustasch album), 2002
- Above All (Jonny King album), 2012
- "Above All" (song), written by Paul Baloche and Lenny LeBlanc
- Above All State Park, in Warren, Connecticut

== See also ==
- Above It All, a 2014 album by Phillips, Craig and Dean
- "Above It All" (song), 2022, by Saint Asonia
- This Above All, a 1941 novel by Eric Knight
  - This Above All (film), 1942, based on the novel
- All of the above (disambiguation)
- Über alles (disambiguation)
