= Dart Island State Park =

Park in Middletown, Connecticut, US

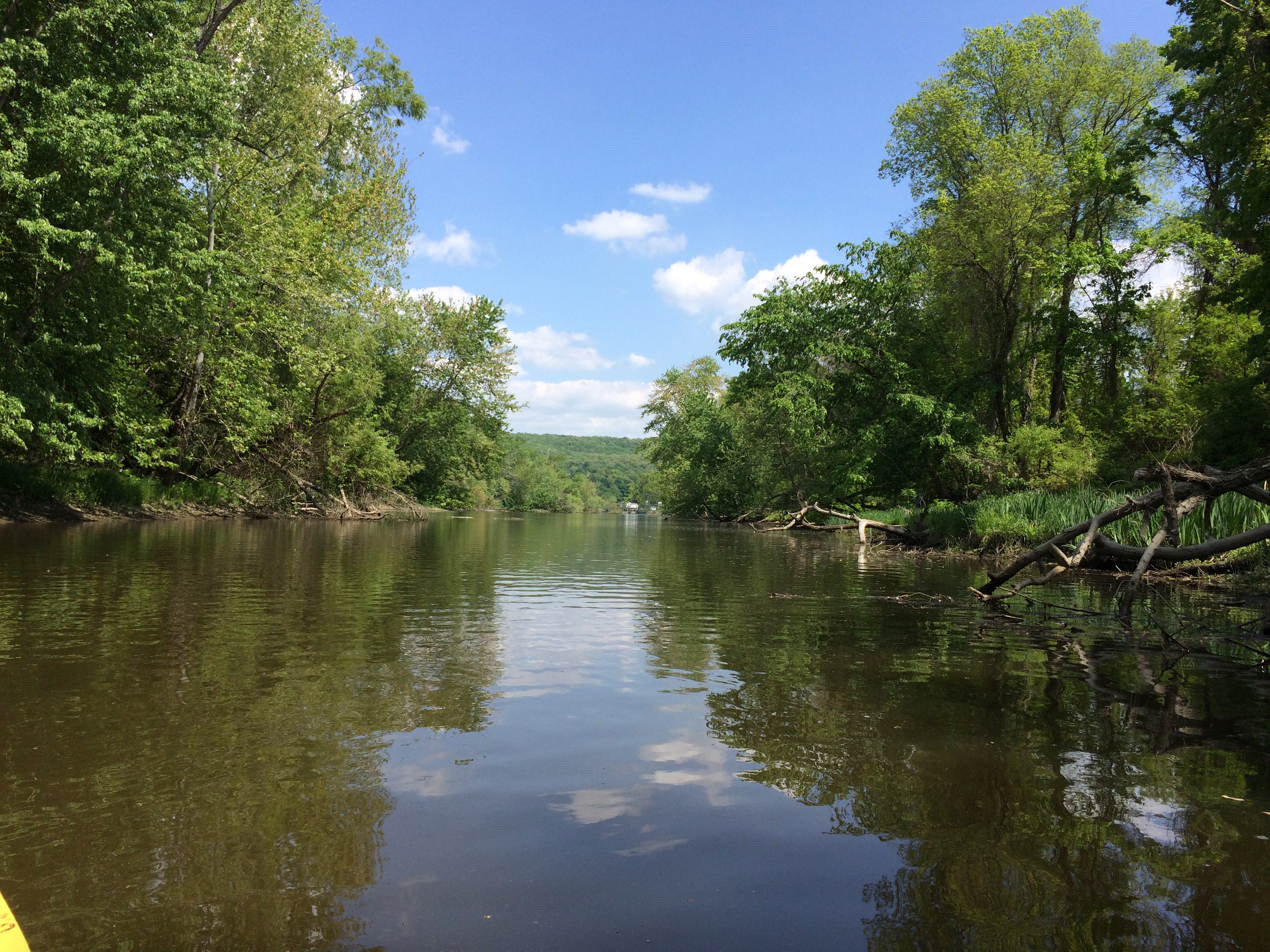
- Looking south to the Connecticut River: Dart Island (left) on the east side of a narrow, protected cove

- Location within Connecticut Location within the United States
- Interactive map of Dart Island State Park
- Location: Middletown, Connecticut, United States
- Coordinates: 41°33′12″N 72°33′51″W
- Area: 19 acres (7.7 ha)
- Elevation: 7 ft (2.1 m)
- Established: 1918
- Administrator: Connecticut Department of Energy and Environmental Protection
- Designation: Connecticut state park
- Named for: Russell Dart
- Website: Official website

Dart Island State Park is a public recreation area comprising an undeveloped 19-acre (7.7 ha) sandbar island in the Connecticut River that is only accessible by boat. The island is within the corporate boundaries of the city of Middletown, Connecticut, its nearest neighbors being the Middletown Generating Station and Pratt and Whitney plant on the river's west bank. The island is wooded with "typical river trees like willow, poplar and red maple." It is managed by Connecticut Department of Energy and Environmental Protection, which lists boating, fishing, and bird watching as activities for visitors.

== History ==
The sandbar was once used by fishermen who built a shed and equipment for managing fishing lines to harvest the river's hickory shad runs. In 1918, Russell Dart donated the approximately 1.5-acre (0.61 ha) island to the Connecticut State Park Commission. The commission designated it as Connecticut's fifteenth state park and named it for its benefactor. The size of the park was subsequently rounded up to two acres in official publications while being rounded down to one acre when referred to unofficially. In 1924, it was touted, unofficially, as being the smallest state park in the United States, with but a single acre. In 1934, the State Register and Manual, the first annual issue to list parks and their sizes, set Dart Island State Park at two acres, and it remained listed at that size for nearly 80 years. The 2012 edition of the Register and Manual listed the park at 19 acres (7.7 ha), the park's official size.

According to Middletown's Harbor Management Plan, Dart Island "is considered undevelopable by the ... State Parks Division, which has no plans for [its] active use or management."

== Activities and amenities ==
The park may be used for bird watching, boating, and fishing. It is only accessible by water and has no facilities for the public.
