= Windsor Meadows State Park =

State park in Hartford County, Connecticut

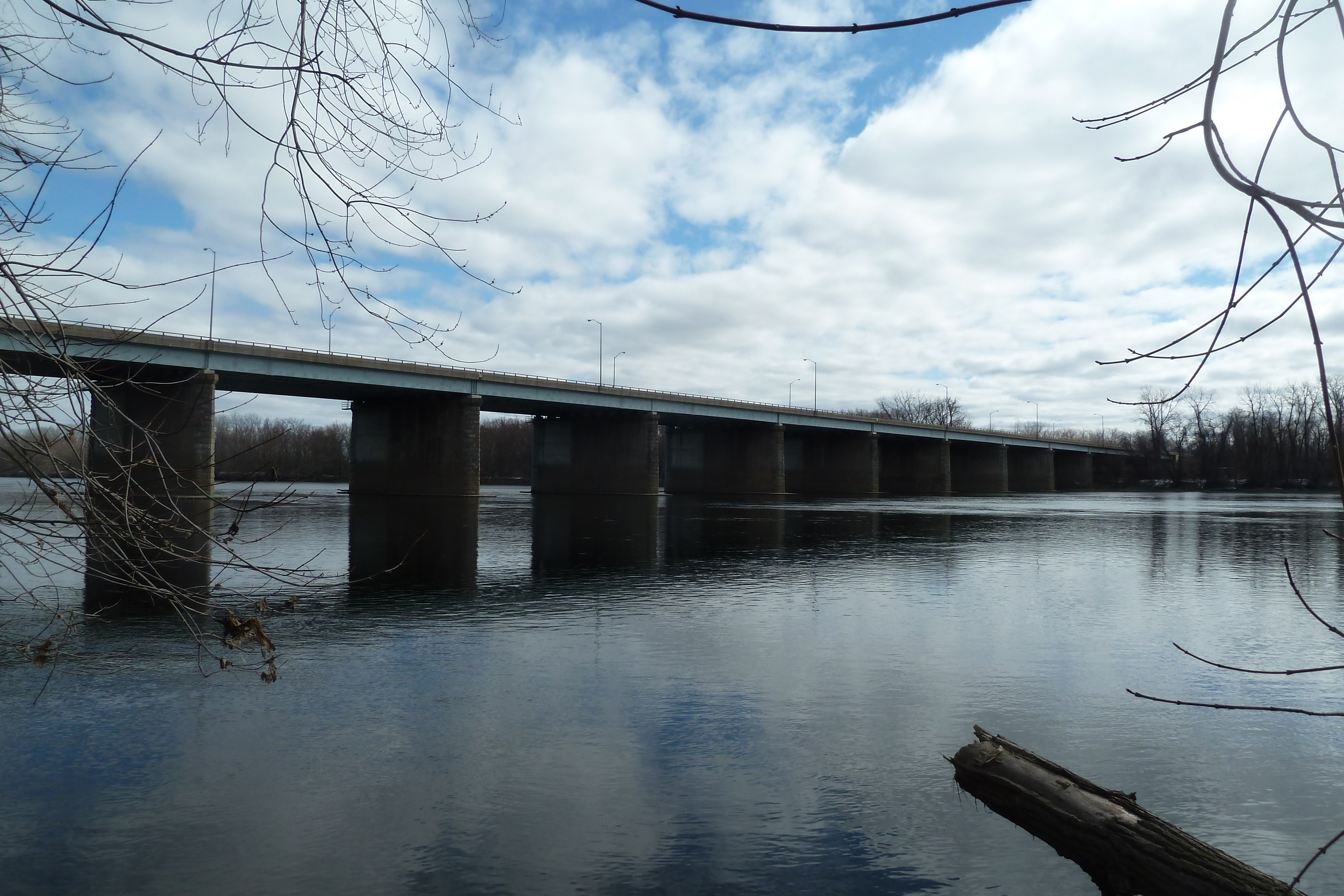
- Bissell Bridge

- Location within Connecticut Location within the United States
- Location: Windsor, Connecticut, United States
- Nearest city: Hartford, Connecticut
- Coordinates: 41°49′06″N 72°38′43″W
- Area: 155 acres (63 ha)
- Elevation: 13 ft (4.0 m)
- Established: 1968
- Administrator: Connecticut Department of Energy and Environmental Protection
- Designation: Connecticut state park
- Website: Official website

Windsor Meadows State Park is a public recreation area on the west side of the Connecticut River in the town of Windsor, Connecticut. The state park occupies three largely undeveloped sections measuring 48, 19, and 88 acres (from north to south) located between railroad tracks and the river. Park activities include picnicking, fishing, boating, hiking, and biking.

== History ==
The park's undeveloped riparian forest and flood plain resemble the landscape seen by Adriaen Block and his crew when they sailed up the river in 1619. The State of Connecticut acquired the land in 1968, then listed it in the 1969 edition of the State Register and Manual as a 128-acre conservation area. Plans to develop a riverwalk-type park were furthered in 2012 with the addition of the one-mile Windsor River Trail.

== Activities and amenities ==
The Windsor River Trail is a 10-foot-wide, handicapped-accessible path with scenic overlooks that parallels the river southward from the Captain John Bissell Memorial Bridge before turning inland, crossing Decker's Brook on an iron bridge, and coming to an end near Meadow Road. The park is also the western terminus of the 1.8-mile-long (2.9 km) Bissell Bridge Walkway Trail, which crosses the river on Bissell Bridge (I-291). Boaters can access the river from a launch ramp located at the bridge's base.
