= Eagle Landing State Park =

State park in Middlesex County, Connecticut

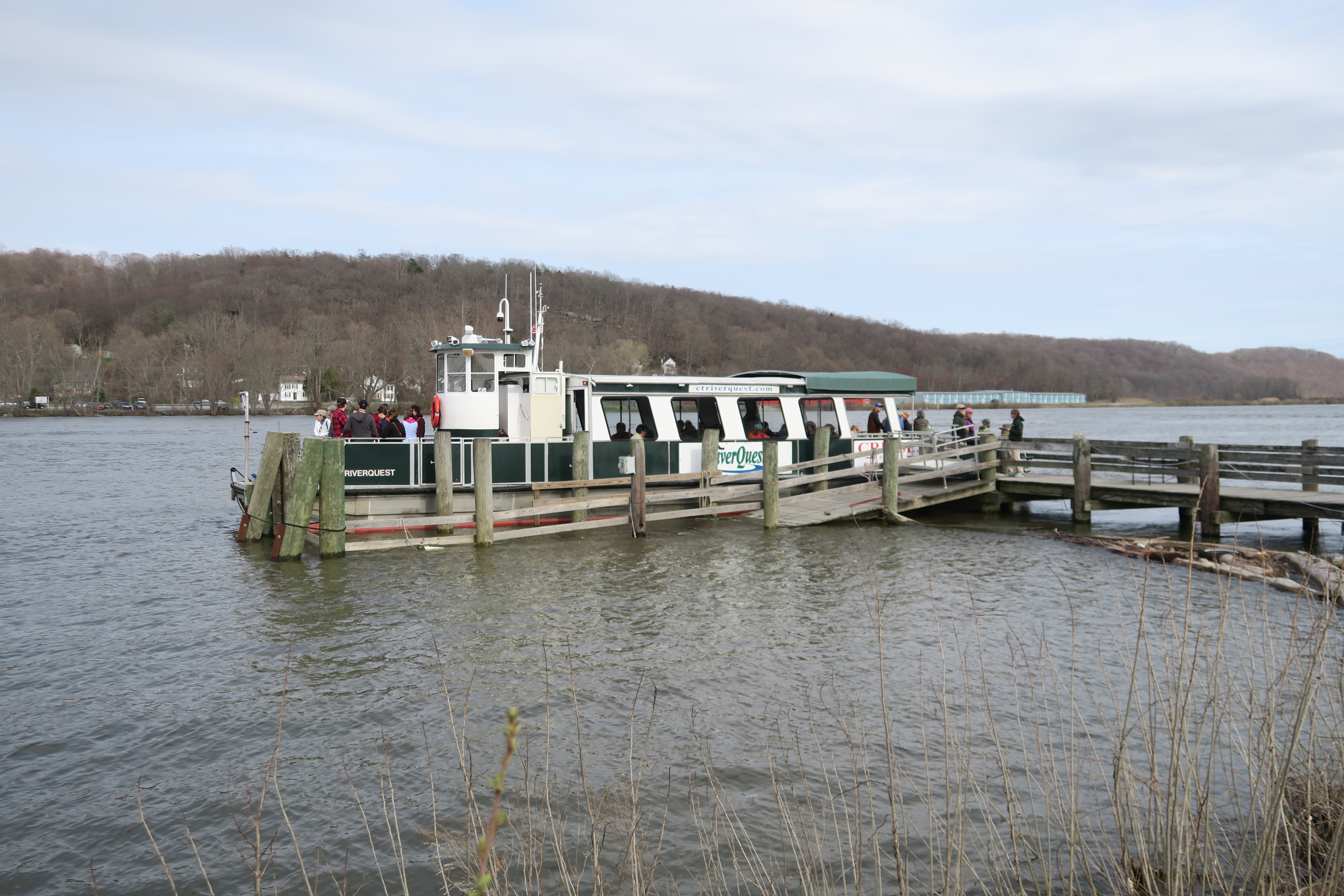
- RiverQuest

- Location within Connecticut Location within the United States
- Location: Haddam, Connecticut, United States
- Coordinates: 41°26′56″N 72°27′56″W
- Area: 16 acres (6.5 ha)
- Designation: Connecticut state park
- Established: 2003
- Administrator: Connecticut Department of Energy and Environmental Protection
- Website: Eagle Landing State Park

Eagle Landing State Park is a public recreation area occupying 16 acres (6.5 ha) on the west bank of the Connecticut River in the town of Haddam, Connecticut. The state park has facilities for picnicking, fishing, bird watching and car-top boating. A private concessionnaire offers river excursions from a dock in the park.

== History ==
While the population of bald eagles in the park was reduced to practically nothing in the 1950s, it has since increased. The site was acquired by the state in 2003 for $1.3 million. An attempt to exchange the land for a larger forested parcel owned by a development firm elsewhere in the town was abandoned in 2012.
