= Day Pond State Park =

State park in New London County, Connecticut

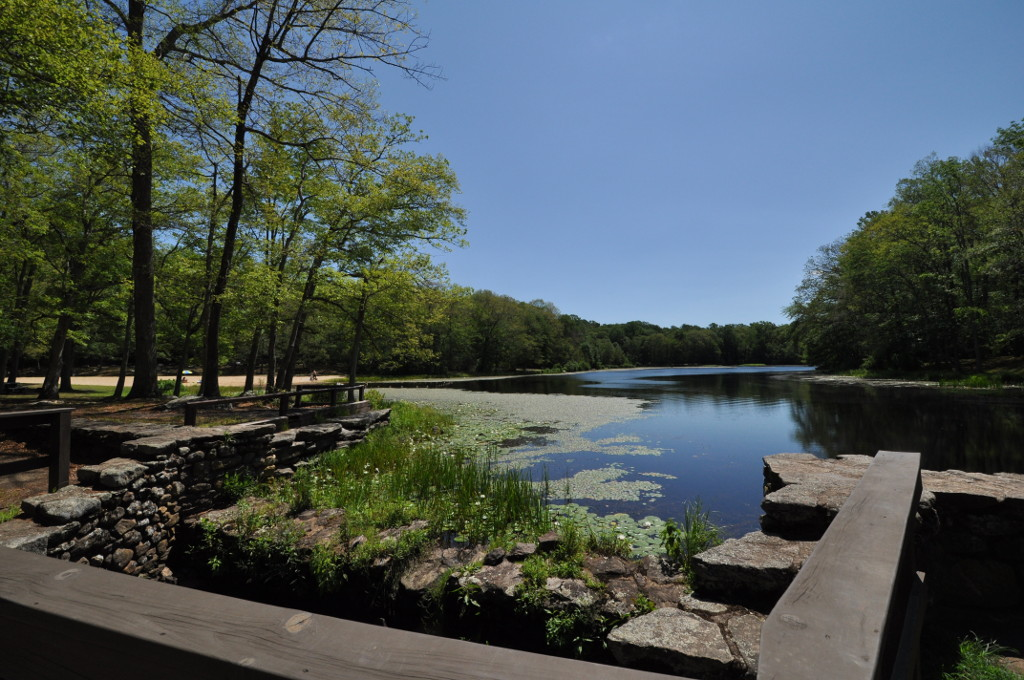

- Location within Connecticut Location within the United States
- Interactive map of Day Pond State Park
- Location: Colchester, Connecticut, United States
- Coordinates: 41°33′24″N 72°25′08″W
- Area: 180 acres (73 ha)
- Elevation: 440 ft (130 m)
- Established: 1949
- Administrator: Connecticut Department of Energy and Environmental Protection
- Designation: Connecticut state park
- Website: Official website

Day Pond State Park is a public recreation area covering 180 acres (73 ha) in the town of Colchester, Connecticut. The state park abuts Salmon River State Forest and is managed by the Connecticut Department of Energy and Environmental Protection. The park offers opportunities for hiking, swimming, shoreline fishing, picnicking and mountain biking.

== History ==
Foundation stones and the park's pond are the few remaining signs of the pioneering Day family, who built the pond to provide waterpower to operate the family sawmill. The land became a state park in 1949.

== Activities and amenities ==
The park is designated for trout management and offers shoreline fishing on Day Pond. The pond covers about 7 acres (2.8 ha) and reaches a depth of a little over 10 feet (3.0 m). Park trails connect with approximately five miles of trails in the adjoining state forest.

== Day Pond Brook Falls ==
A multi-drop waterfall can be found along Day Pond Brook, dropping a total height of 40 feet (12 meters). The falls were once not well known and could not be accessed without bushwhacking. But in 2010, a spur trail was created by a Boy Scout to provide easier access to the falls for the public.

== Gallery ==
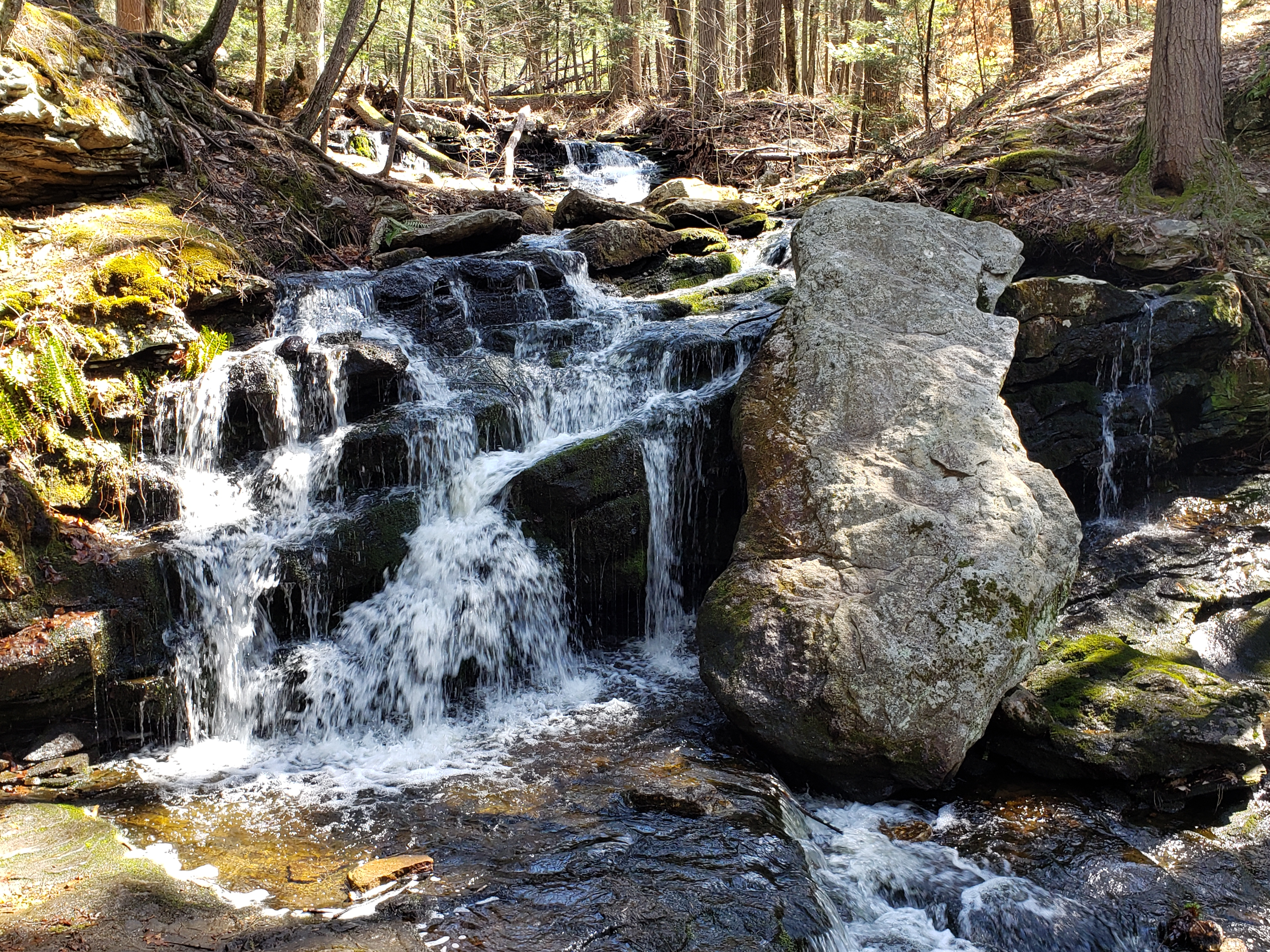

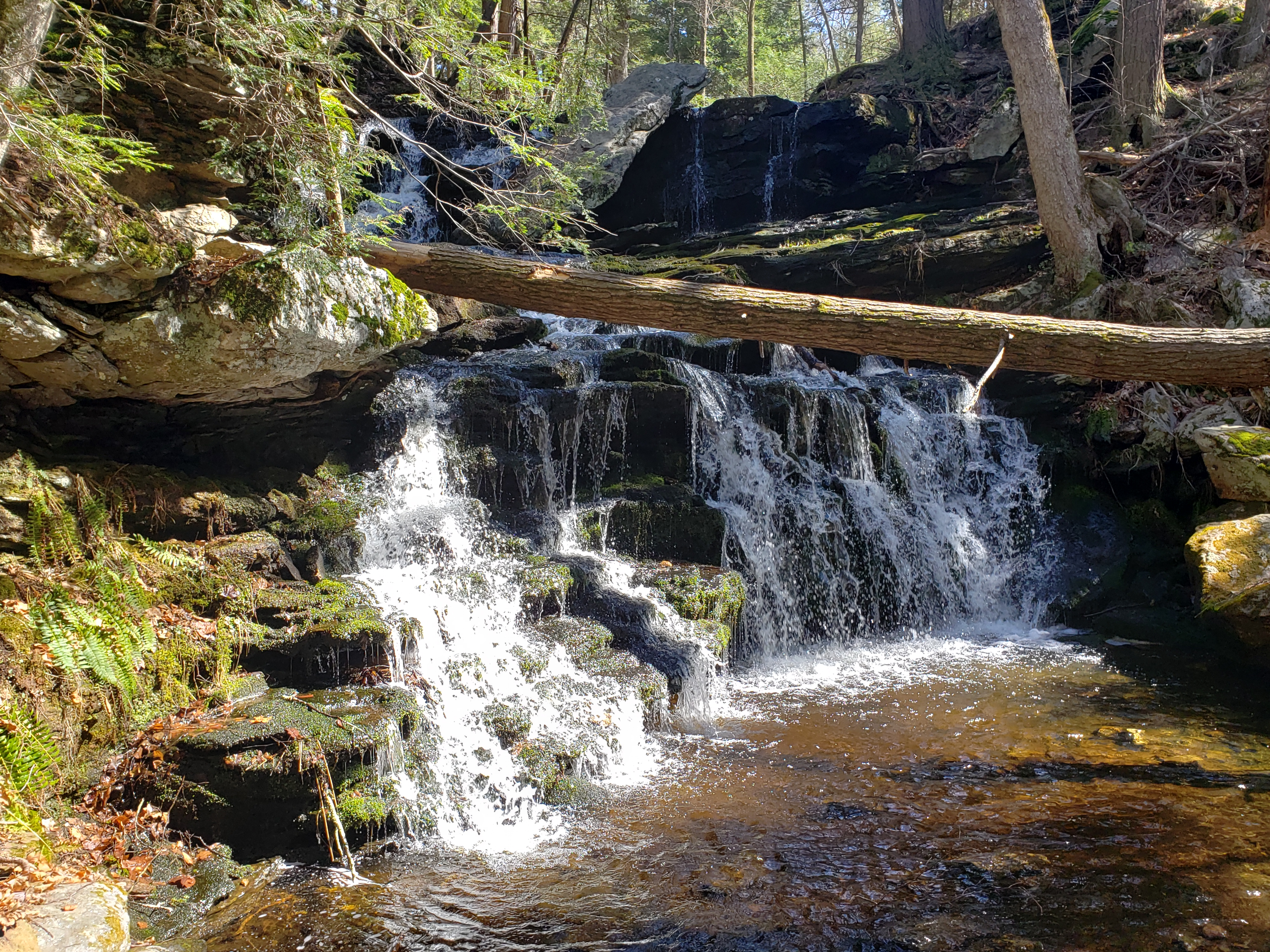

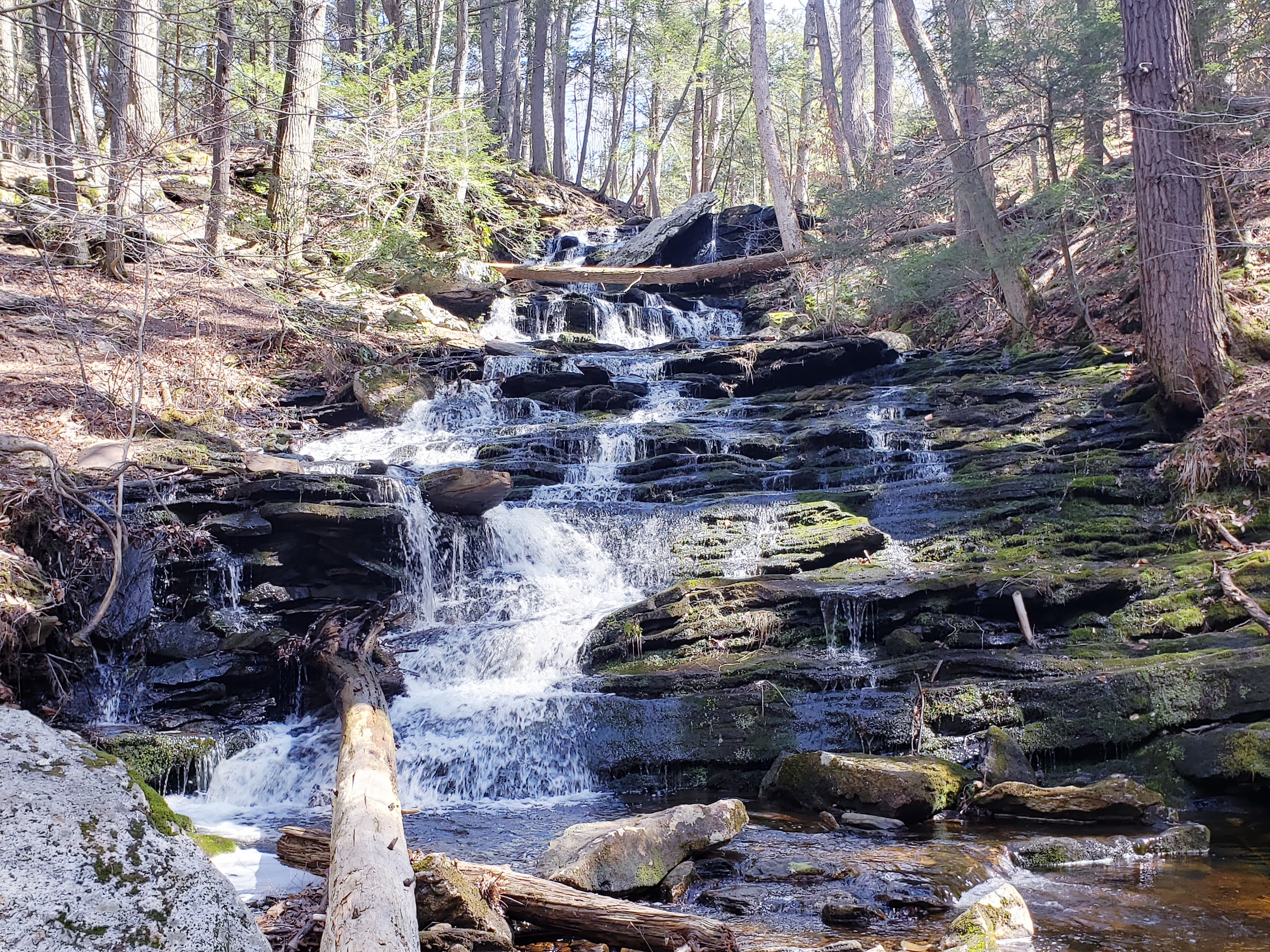
