= George Waldo State Park =

State park in New Haven County, Connecticut

- Location within Connecticut Location within the United States
- Location: Southbury, Connecticut, United States
- Coordinates: 41°27′45″N 73°17′28″W
- Area: 150 acres (61 ha)
- Elevation: 315 ft (96 m)
- Established: 1957
- Administrator: Connecticut Department of Energy and Environmental Protection
- Designation: Connecticut state park
- Website: Official website

George Waldo State Park is an undeveloped public recreation area on the eastern shore of Lake Lillinonah in the town of Southbury, Connecticut. Park activities include hiking, mountain biking, horseback riding, fishing, and hunting. The park's 2.1-mile (3.4 km) loop trail is described as a moderately challenging route. The state park is managed by the Connecticut Department of Energy and Environmental Protection.

== History ==
George Curtis Waldo was chairman of the Connecticut Park and Forest Commission in the 1940s and the owner of the Bridgeport Post. He died in 1956 at the age of 68. George C. Waldo State Park was first listed in the State of Connecticut Register and Manual in 1957.
