= Red Cedar Lake =

Red Cedar Lake may refer to:

- Red Cedar Lake (Connecticut), United States
- Red Cedar Lake (Ontario), Canada
- Red Cedar Lake (Wisconsin), United States
