= Stillwater Pond State Park =

State park in Litchfield County, Connecticut

- Location within Connecticut Location within the United States
- Location: Torrington, Connecticut, United States
- Coordinates: 41°50′29″N 73°09′04″W
- Area: 226 acres (91 ha)
- Elevation: 732 ft (223 m)
- Administrator: Connecticut Department of Energy and Environmental Protection
- Designation: Connecticut state park
- Website: Official website

Stillwater Pond State Park is a public recreation area covering 226 acres (91 ha) in the town of Torrington, Connecticut. The state park surrounds Stillwater Pond, a 100-acre (40 ha) impoundment on the West Branch Naugatuck River. Fishing, boating, and a paved boat ramp are offered.
