= Mono Pond State Park Reserve =

Protected area in Connecticut, US

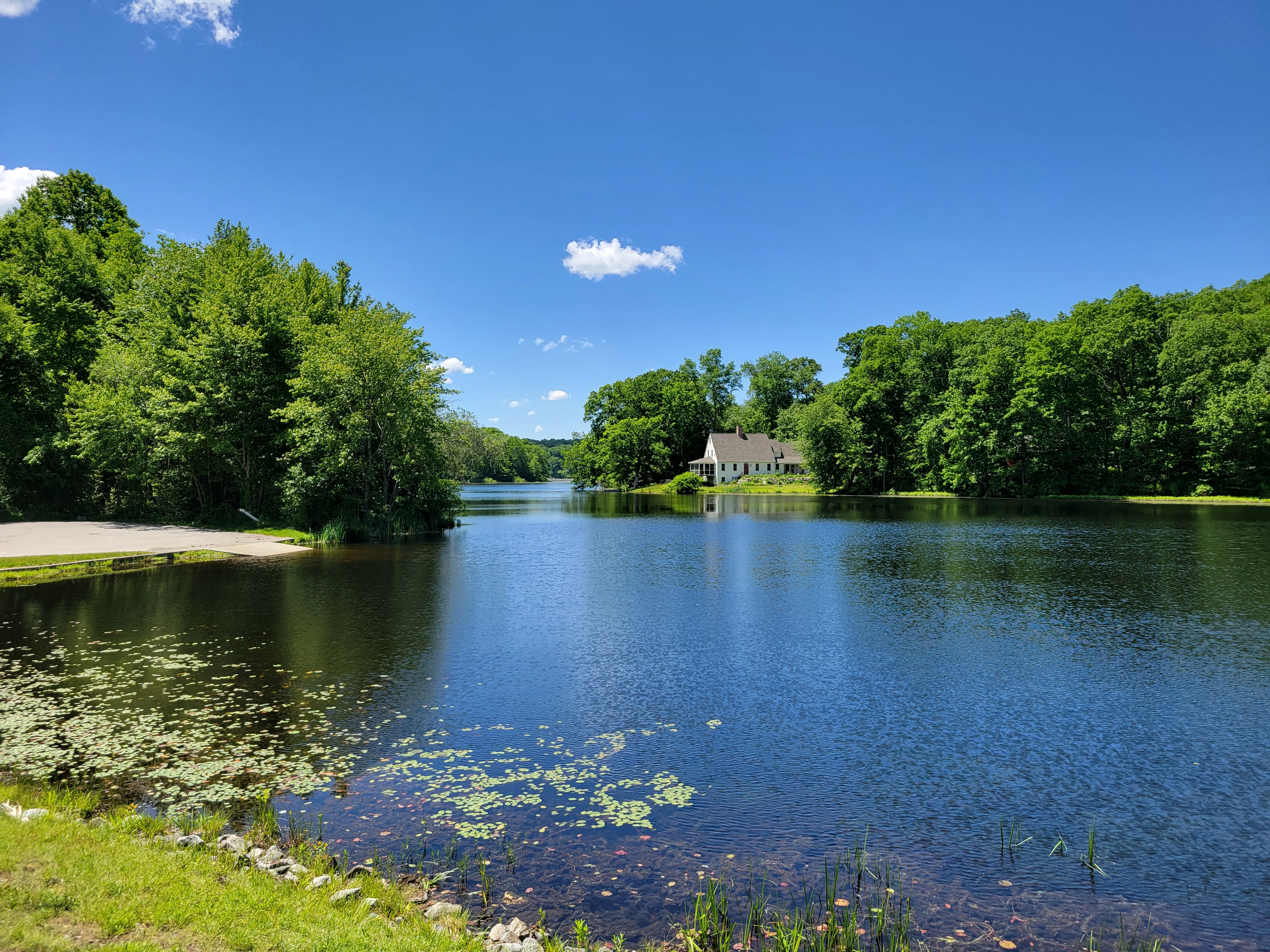
- Mono Pond

- Location within Connecticut Location within the United States
- Location: Columbia, Connecticut, United States
- Coordinates: 41°40′47″N 72°18′39″W
- Area: 218 acres (88 ha)
- Elevation: 541 ft (165 m)
- Established: 2008
- Administrator: Connecticut Department of Energy and Environmental Protection
- Designation: Connecticut state park
- Website: Official website

Mono Pond State Park Reserve is a public recreation area covering 218 acres (88 ha) in the town of Columbia, Connecticut, 8 miles (13 km) southwest of Willimantic. The state park surrounds Mono Pond, a 113-acre (46 ha) body of water averaging depths of 3.5 feet (1.1 m) with an area near the dam reaching a depth of nine feet (2.7 m). The park offers fishing, hiking, picnicking, cross-country skiing, bow hunting, and a boat launch for motorized (8-hp limit) and non-motorized boating. The park is managed by the Connecticut Department of Energy and Environmental Protection and was added to the roll of Connecticut state parks in 2008.
