= River Highlands State Park =

State park in Middlesex County, Connecticut

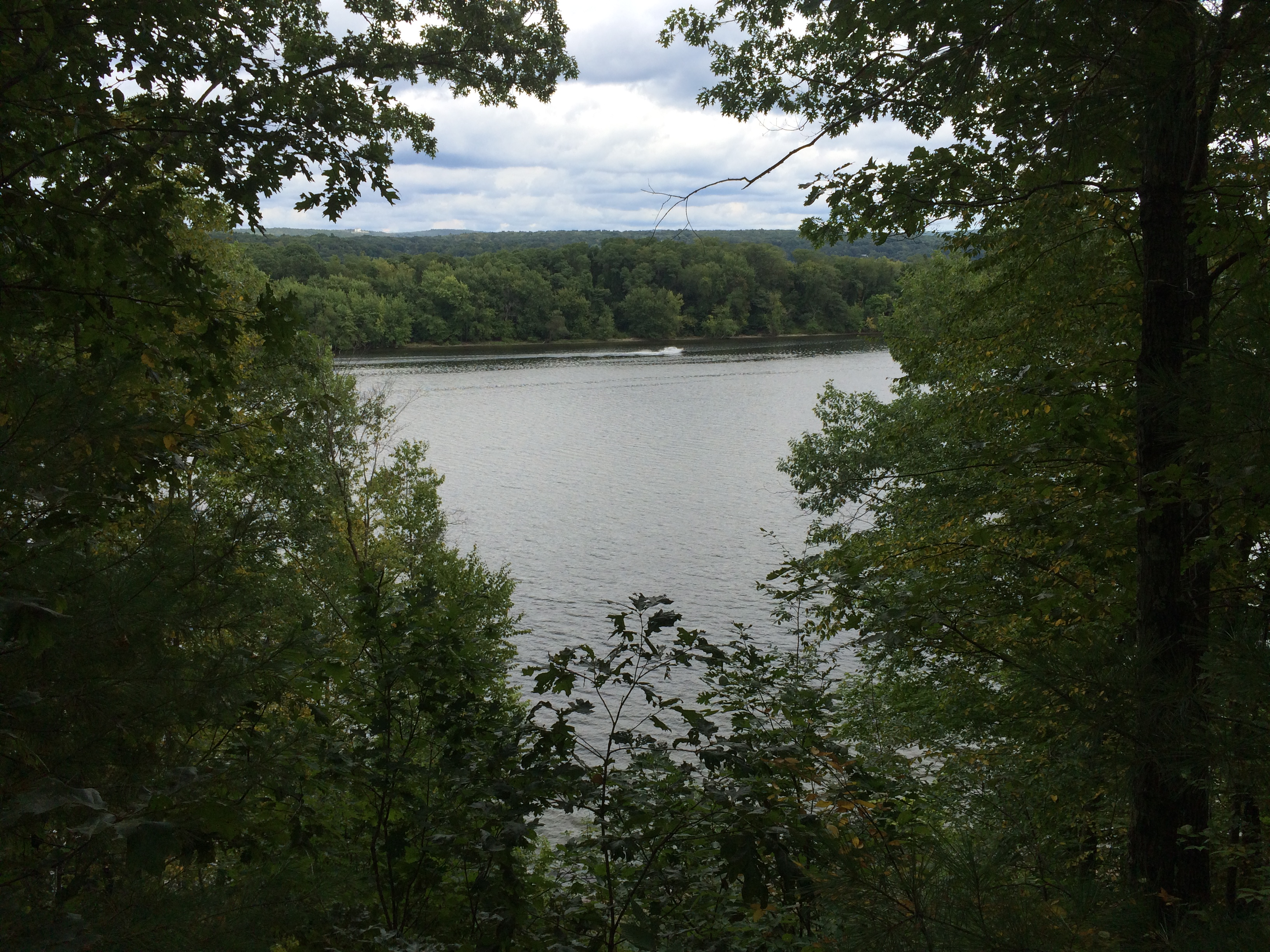
- View from the western ridge of the Connecticut River in River Highlands State Park.

- Location within Connecticut Location within the United States
- Location: Cromwell, Connecticut, United States
- Coordinates: 41°37′10″N 72°37′53″W
- Area: 177 acres (72 ha)
- Designation: Connecticut state park
- Established: 1995
- Administrator: Connecticut Department of Energy and Environmental Protection
- Website: River Highlands State Park

River Highlands State Park is a public recreation area located on the west bank of the Connecticut River in the town of Cromwell, Connecticut. The 177-acre (72 ha) state park is managed by Connecticut Department of Energy and Environmental Protection.

== History ==
The property sits at a river bend once known as "the blow hole," where whistling winds were said by sailors to speed along their ships. The hole itself, silenced by silting, was last heard sometime in the middle years of the twentieth century. The park's acreage was inherited by the family of Ulia Allegretti, who then sold it to the state in 1995. Using funds from an open space acquisition fund, the State Department of Environmental Protection paid $1,195,000 for the land. The park was opened to the public in 2001.

== Activities and amenities ==
The park offers hiking trails and scenic river vistas. Trails are also used for mountain biking. It is one of four state parks where boaters can find primitive camping.
