= Rocky Glen State Park =

State park in Fairfield County, Connecticut

- Location within Connecticut Location within the United States
- Location: Newtown, Connecticut, United States
- Coordinates: 41°25′42″N 73°16′55″W
- Area: 46 acres (19 ha)
- Elevation: 322 ft (98 m)
- Established: 1943
- Administrator: Connecticut Department of Energy and Environmental Protection
- Designation: Connecticut state park
- Website: Official website

Rocky Glen State Park is an undeveloped public recreation area covering 46 acres (19 ha) along the west side of the Pootatuck River in the town of Newtown, Connecticut. The state park offers opportunities for hiking to a scenic cascade and includes a one-and-a-half mile stretch of Al's Trail, a 10.7-mile (17.2 km) greenway trail that winds through Newtown. It appeared as the state's forty-seventh state park in the 1943 edition of the Connecticut Register and Manual. The park is managed by the Connecticut Department of Energy and Environmental Protection.
