= Haddam Meadows State Park =

State park in Middlesex County, Connecticut

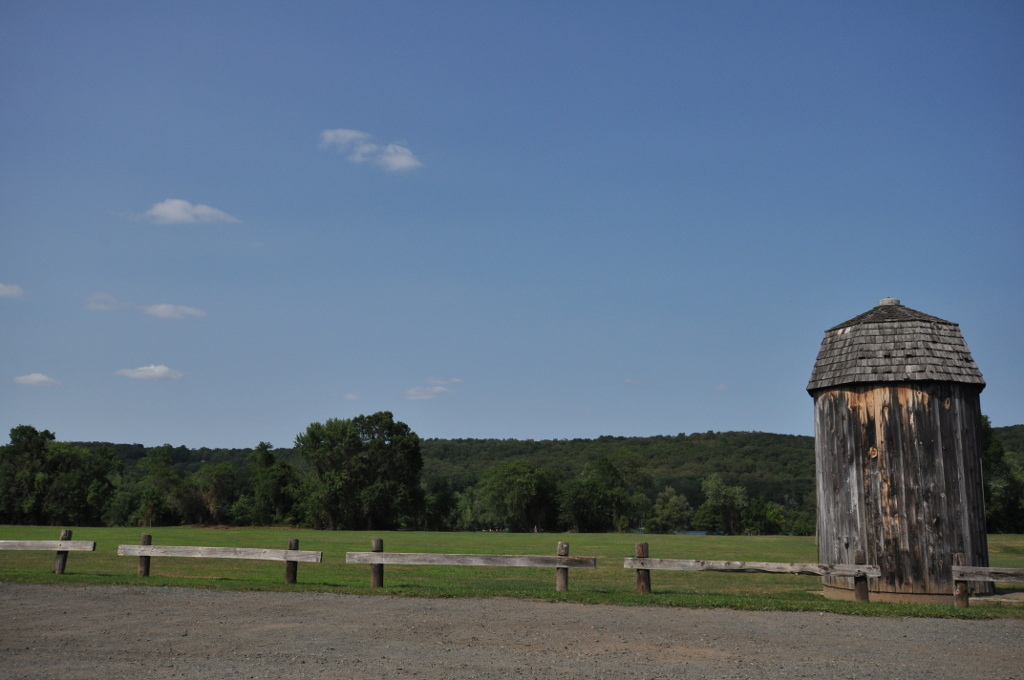

- Location within Connecticut Location within the United States
- Location: Haddam, Connecticut, United States
- Coordinates: 41°28′44″N 72°30′31″W
- Area: 175 acres (71 ha)
- Elevation: 3 ft (0.91 m)
- Established: 1944
- Administrator: Connecticut Department of Energy and Environmental Protection
- Designation: Connecticut state park
- Website: Official website

Haddam Meadows State Park is a public recreation area occupying 175 acres (71 ha) on the west bank of the Connecticut River in the town of Haddam, Connecticut. The state park offers picnicking, fishing, and a boat launch. Park trails lend access to a diversity of riverside landscapes: marsh, beach, sand bar, fern growths, meadow lands, and hardwood forest. The park was established through the donation of land in 1944 by the Edward W. Hazen Foundation. It is managed by the Connecticut Department of Energy and Environmental Protection.
