= John A. Minetto State Park =

State park in Litchfield County, Connecticut

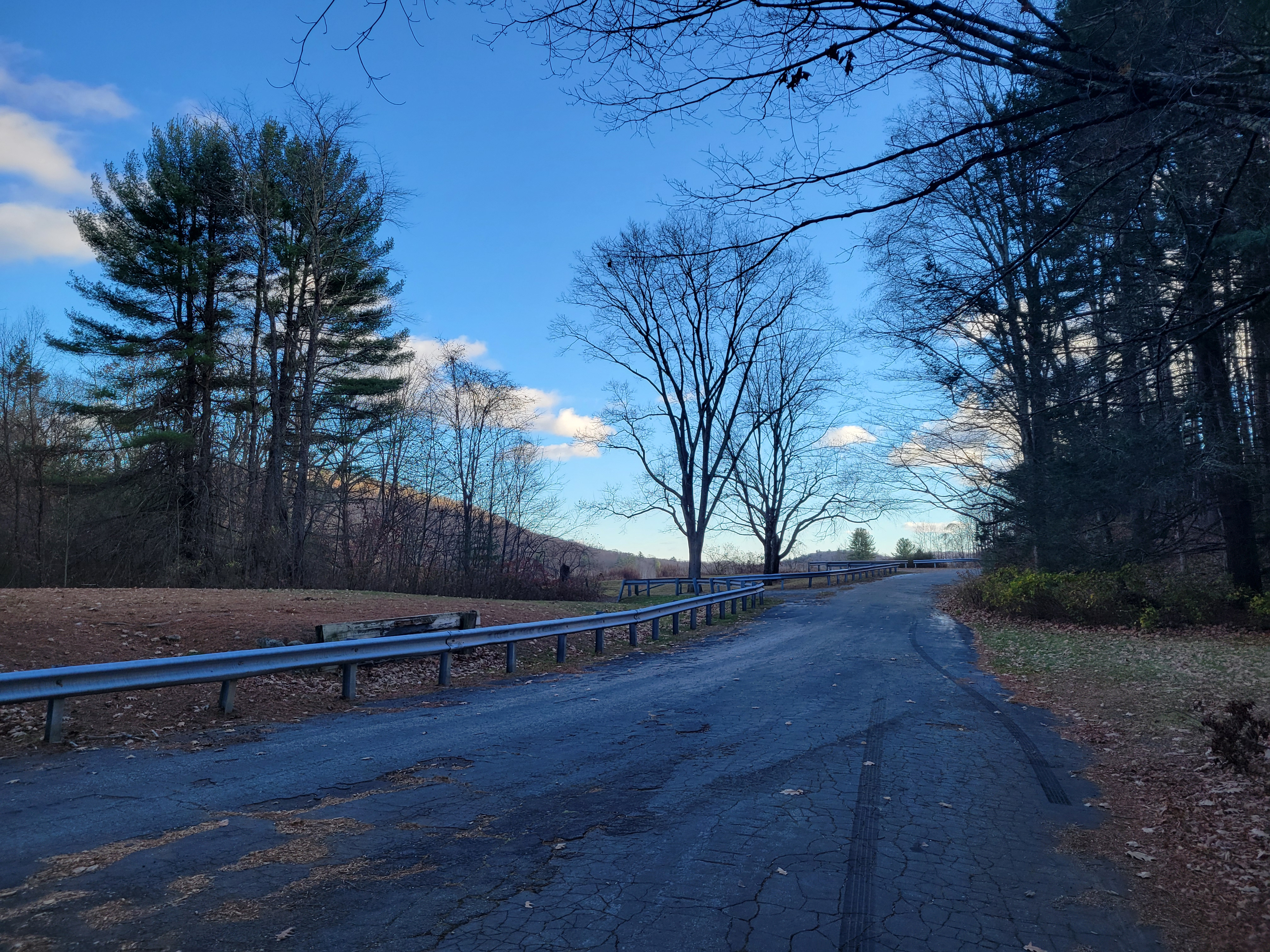
- John A Minetto State Park

- Location within Connecticut Location within the United States
- Location: Goshen and Torrington, Connecticut, United States
- Coordinates: 41°53′00″N 73°09′13″W
- Area: 715 acres (289 ha)
- Elevation: 1,296 feet (395 m)
- Designation: Connecticut state park
- Established: 1965
- Administrator: Connecticut Department of Energy and Environmental Protection
- Website: John A. Minetto State Park

John A. Minetto State Park is a public recreation area encompassing 715 acres (289 ha) in the towns of Goshen and Torrington, Connecticut. Facilities are available for picnicking, fishing, and cross-country skiing. The state park is managed by the Connecticut Department of Energy and Environmental Protection.

== History ==
The park is part of a flood control project initiated by the U.S. Army Corps of Engineers, who turned the land over to state management following the completion of the Hall Meadow Brook Dam in 1962. Opened under the name Hall Meadow State Park, it was renamed in 1972 in honor of Torrington State Senator John A. Minetto.
