= Enders State Forest =

State forest in Connecticut, United States

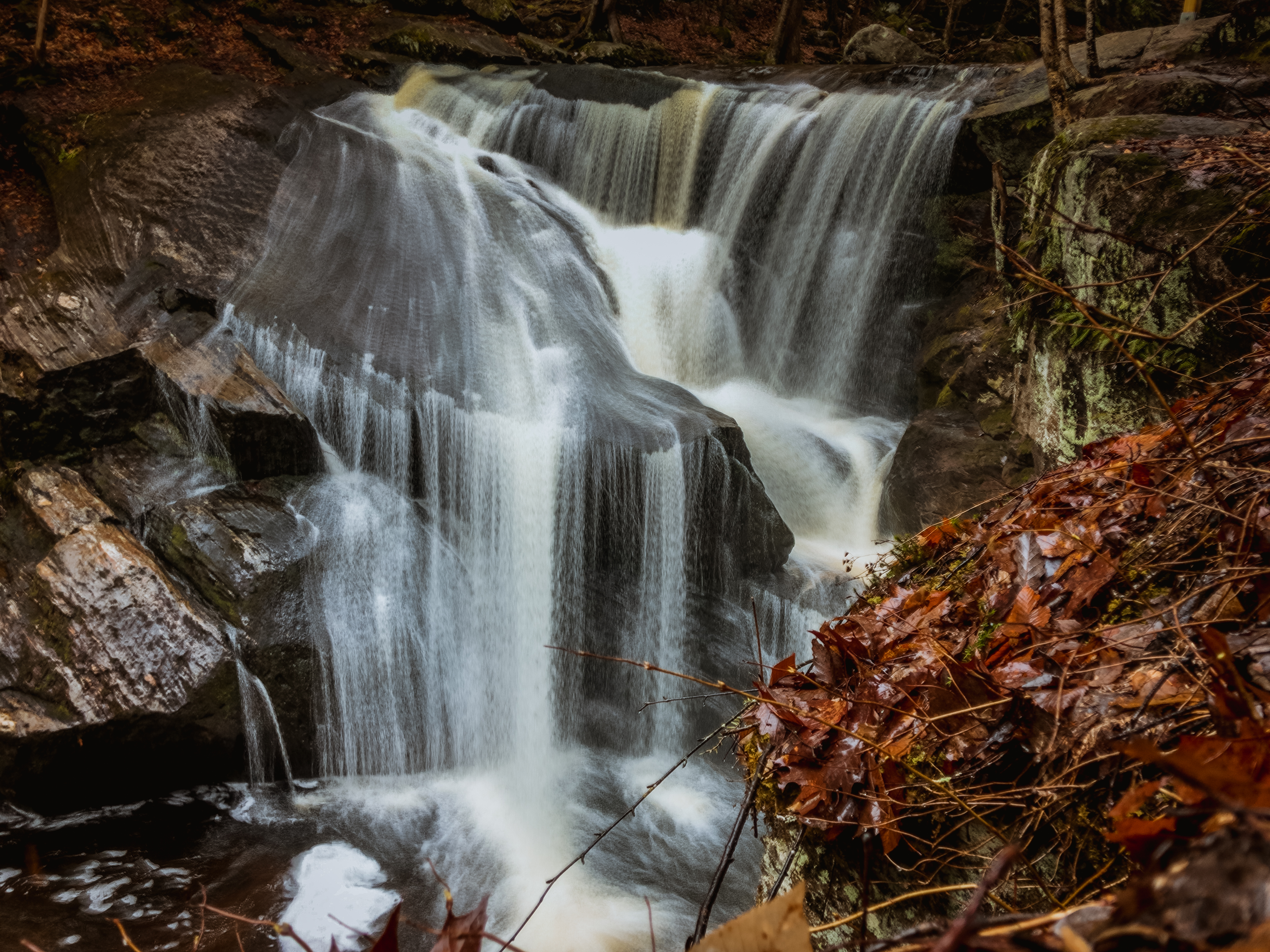
- Ender Falls

- Location within Connecticut Location within the United States
- Location: Granby and Barkhamsted, Connecticut, United States
- Coordinates: 41°57′43″N 72°54′18″W
- Area: 2,105 acres (852 ha)
- Max. elevation: 1,100 feet
- Min. elevation: 900 feet
- Established: 1970
- Administrator: Connecticut Department of Energy and Environmental Protection
- Website: Official website

Enders State Forest is a Connecticut state forest located in the towns of Granby and Barkhamsted. The forest was established in 1970 with a 1,500-acre (610 ha) parcel of woodlands donated to the state by the children of John and Harriet Enders. A further family donation of land was made in 1981, and the state made a purchase of additional property in 2002.

== Recreation ==
Several waterfalls known as Enders Falls form the core of the state forest and are popular with swimmers in the summer, though the state warns against the activity, and a number of injuries and deaths have been reported.
