= Quinebaug Lake State Park =

State park in Windham County, Connecticut

- Location within Connecticut Location within the United States
- Location: Killingly, Connecticut, United States
- Coordinates: 41°46′28″N 71°53′16″W
- Area: 181 acres (73 ha)
- Elevation: 197 ft (60 m)
- Established: 1964
- Administrator: Connecticut Department of Energy and Environmental Protection
- Designation: Connecticut state park
- Website: Official website
Wauregan Reservoir
- (Quinebaug Pond, Quinebaug Lake)
- Location within Connecticut
- Location: Killingly, Connecticut
- Coordinates: 41°46′28″N 71°53′16″W
- Type: Lake/reservoir
- Primary inflows: Quondock Brook
- Primary outflows: Quondock Brook to Quinebaug River
- Max. length: 4,150 ft (1,260 m)
- Max. width: 982 ft (299 m)
- Surface area: 68 acres (28 ha)
- Average depth: 16 ft (4.9 m)
- Max. depth: 31 ft (9.4 m)
- Residence time: 282 days
- Surface elevation: 197 ft (60 m)

Quinebaug Lake State Park is a public recreation area covering 181 acres (73 ha) in the town of Killingly, Connecticut. The state park offers opportunities for fishing and non-motorized boating on Wauregan Reservoir. The park is managed by the Connecticut Department of Energy and Environmental Protection.

== History ==
The 88-acre (36 ha) Wauregan Reservoir, also known as Quinebaug Pond and Quinebaug Lake, is a lake of natural origin that has had its size increased by a dam at its outlet; it reaches depths of 31 feet (9.4 m). The lake is fed by Quinebaug Brook, also known as Quandock Brook. The reservoir and surroundings entered the Connecticut Register and Manual as Quinebaug Lake State Park in 1964.

== Activities and amenities ==
Quinebaug Lake is a state-designated bass management lake. A boat launch is located at the lake's northern end.
