= Nye-Holman State Forest =

State forest in Connecticut, United States

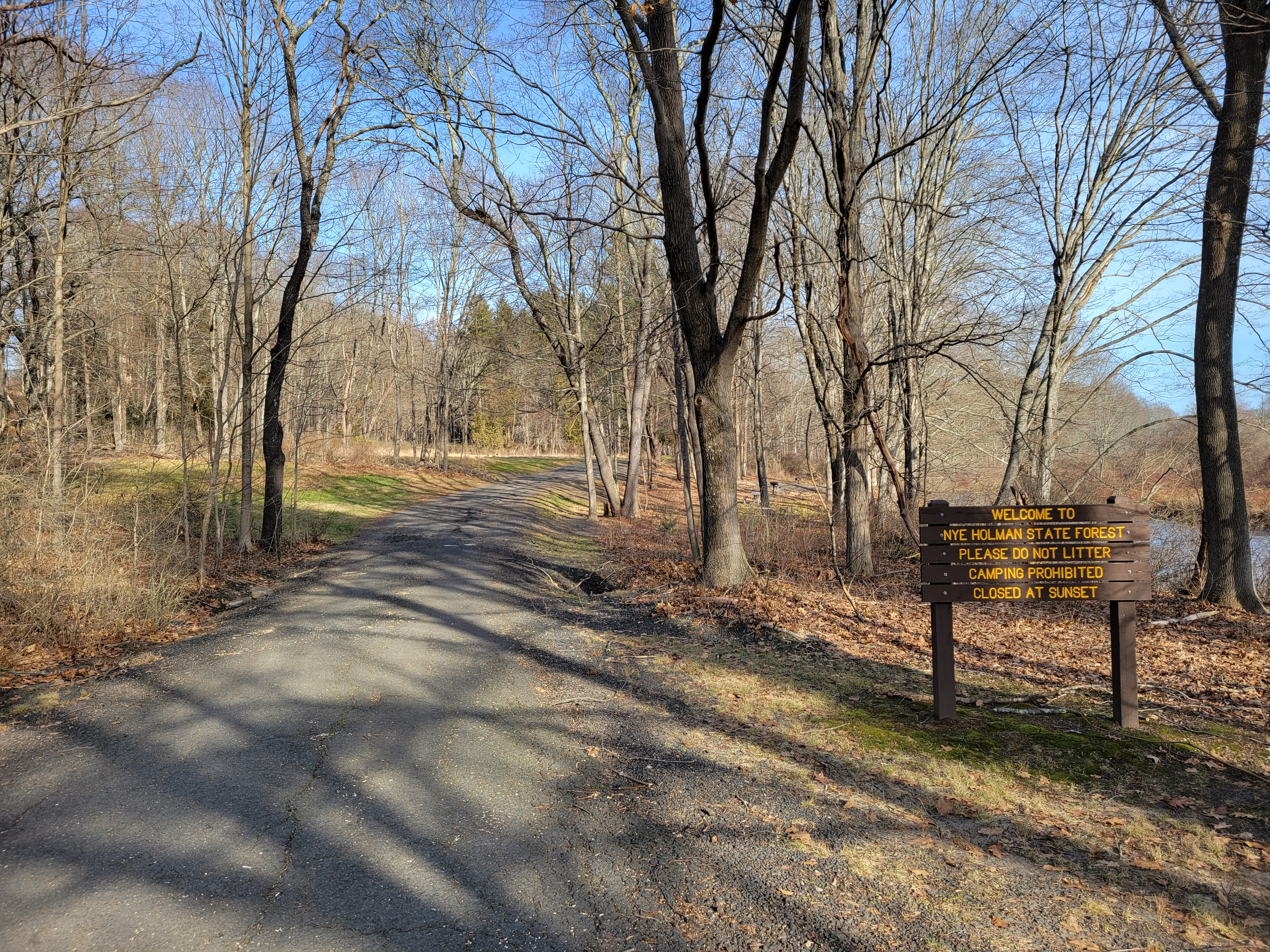

- Location within Connecticut Location within the United States
- Location: Tolland, Ellington, and Willington, Connecticut, United States
- Coordinates: 41°56′06″N 72°19′22″W
- Area: 786 acres (318 ha)
- Elevation: 673 ft (205 m)
- Established: 1931
- Administrator: Connecticut Department of Energy and Environmental Protection
- Website: Official website

Nye-Holman State Forest is a Connecticut state forest located in the town of Tolland. The portion of the Willimantic River that flows through the forest is a trout management area restricted to catch and release fly-fishing, the Cole W. Wilde Trout Management Area. An archery range is also within the forest.
