= Killingly Pond State Park =

State park in Connecticut, United States

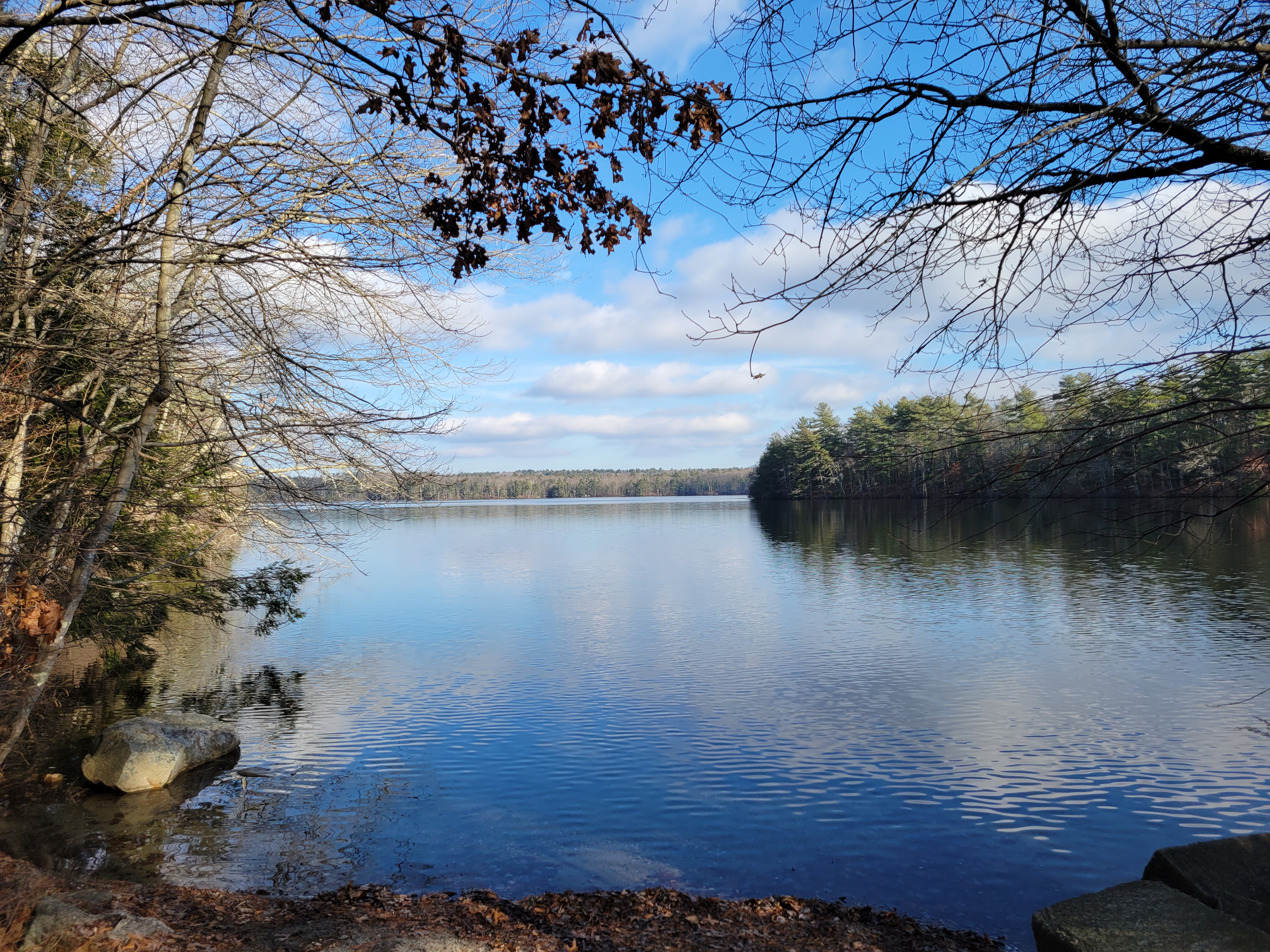
- Killingly Pond

- Location within Connecticut Location within the United States
- Location: Killingly, Connecticut, United States
- Coordinates: 41°51′45″N 71°48′20″W
- Area: 162 acres (66 ha)
- Elevation: 587 ft (179 m)
- Administrator: Connecticut Department of Energy and Environmental Protection
- Designation: Connecticut state park
- Website: Official website
Killingly Pond
- Location within Connecticut
- Location: Killingly, Connecticut & Glocester, Rhode Island
- Coordinates: 41°51′45″N 71°47′45″W
- Type: Reservoir
- Primary outflows: Unnamed flow into Middle Reservoir
- Max. length: 3,246 feet (989 m)
- Max. width: 2,547 feet (776 m)
- Surface area: 138 acres (56 ha)
- Average depth: 11.6 feet (3.5 m)
- Max. depth: 20 feet (6.1 m)
- Residence time: 296 days
- Surface elevation: 587 feet (179 m)
- Islands: Unnamed reef

Killingly Pond State Park is a public recreation area encompassing 162 acres (66 ha) in the town of Killingly, Connecticut. The state park sits on the western side of Killingly Pond, a 122-acre (49 ha) body of water that straddles the state line between Connecticut and Rhode Island. The park offers boating, fishing, hiking, and hunting.
