= Above All State Park =

Public recreation area in Connecticut, United States

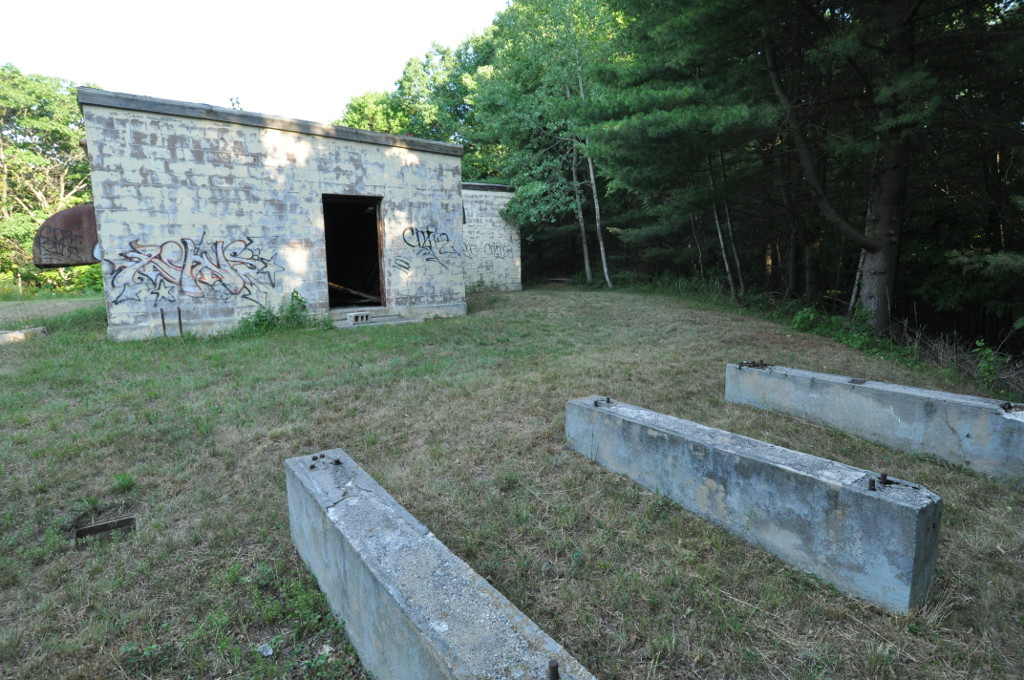

- Location within Connecticut
- Interactive map of Above All State Park
- Location: Warren, Connecticut, United States
- Coordinates: 41°43′37″N 73°21′10″W
- Area: 31 acres (13 ha)
- Elevation: 1,473 ft (449 m)
- Established: 1927
- Administrator: Connecticut Department of Energy and Environmental Protection
- Designation: Connecticut state park
- Website: Official website

Above All State Park is an undeveloped public recreation area located in the town of Warren, Connecticut. Remnants of a Cold War-era military radar installation (pictured at right) may be seen. The only park amenities are informal trails not maintained by the Connecticut Department of Energy and Environmental Protection.

== History ==
Because of its reputation as one of the best lookouts in Litchfield County, the Above All peak was the site of a wooden observation tower in the years before the Civil War. A mountain-top summer resort planned in the 1880s, that would have featured a 125-foot (38 m) observation tower for the viewing of far distant sights, never materialized. The park originated in 1927 when the heirs of Seymour Strong gave three acres of land to the state. The state's purchase of 28 adjoining acres from the Stanley estate followed in December 1927. In 1934, the State Register and Manual identified Above All as Connecticut's 36th state park.

From June 1957 to June 1968, the state park became a Semi-Automatic Ground Environment (SAGE) Air Defense Network radar site. The military installation was called the New Preston Gap-Filler RADAR Annex P-50A /Z-50A. The site was an unmanned gap-filler "providing low altitude coverage" that "consisted of the radar and tower along with the building which contained the radar equipment and a diesel generator." In 1968, a dirt road and cinder block building were added to the top of the hill as part of an upgrade to the site. In 1981, the park was the subject of a study by Northeast Utilities as a possible wind power site. An anemometer and wind vane were placed atop a 65-foot (20 m) tower to record wind data.

== Park name ==
According to the WPA writers who created Connecticut: A Guide to Its Roads, Lore, and People in the 1930s, the park's name came from its "top of the world" isolation. In his book on Connecticut's state parks, Joseph Leary traces the name to the land's use by the Stone family, who claimed it was the highest working farm by elevation in all of Connecticut.

== Status ==
Accessing the park off Connecticut Route 341 requires passing a barred gate. Informal trails near the top of the park are not maintained or marked and there are no facilities. Structures on the site include the radar equipment building, footings for the radar tower, and supports for the generator's fuel tank. Photos displayed on the Radome website show the condition of the site in 2001 and 2006 with the equipment building in "excellent condition," and the radar tower and chain-link fencing missing. The site has been vandalized by graffiti.
