= Ross Pond State Park =

State park in Windham County, Connecticut

- Location within Connecticut Location within the United States
- Interactive map of Ross Pond State Park
- Location: Killingly, Connecticut, United States
- Coordinates: 41°46′22″N 71°51′50″W
- Area: 314 acres (127 ha)
- Elevation: 358 ft (109 m)
- Established: 1964
- Administrator: Connecticut Department of Energy and Environmental Protection
- Website: Official website
- Connecticut state parks

Ross Pond State Park is a public recreation area covering 372 acres (151 ha) in the towns of Killingly and Plainfield, Connecticut. The state park offers rock climbing, mountain biking, hiking, hunting, fishing, and a boat launch. It sits adjacent to Old Furnace State Park and a blue-blazed trail connects the two. Ross Pond State Park entered the Connecticut Register and Manual in 1964 as a state park with 181 acres (73 ha).
