= Wooster Mountain State Park =

State park in Fairfield County, Connecticut

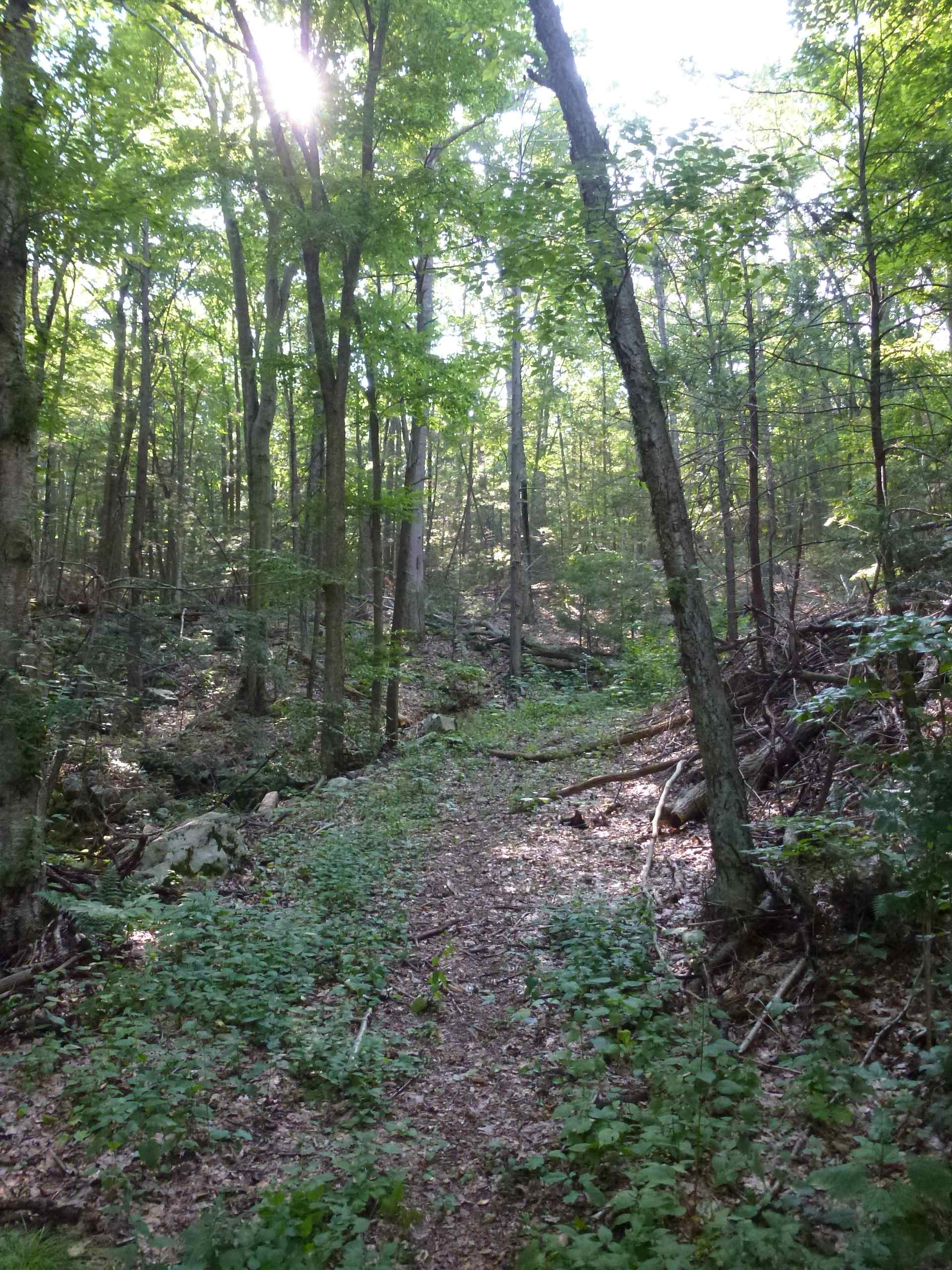

- Location within Connecticut Location within the United States
- Location: Danbury, Connecticut, United States
- Coordinates: 41°20′40″N 73°28′27″W
- Area: 444 acres (180 ha)
- Elevation: 971 ft (296 m)
- Established: 1920
- Administrator: Connecticut Department of Energy and Environmental Protection
- Designation: Connecticut state park
- Website: Official website

Wooster Mountain State Park is an undeveloped public recreation area located within the city limits of Danbury, Connecticut. The state park covers 444 acres (180 ha) and is managed by the Connecticut Department of Energy and Environmental Protection.

== History ==
The park was established in 1920 as Connecticut's 23rd state park through an initial purchase of 100 acres. The State Park Commission adopted the name Wooster Mountain, which was not used locally, "for its historical association, as marking the mountain mass over which General [David] Wooster pursued British troops in their hasty retreat from Danbury" in 1777, during which General Wooster was mortally wounded.

The Civilian Conservation Corps was active in the park from 1935 to 1937, clearing trees that were infected with Dutch elm disease. The CCC's former campground forms the site of the Wooster Mountain firing range.

== Activities and amenities ==
The park is suitable for hiking and hunting and is crossed by the Ives Trail. Target, skeet and trap shooting are offered at the Wooster Mountain State Park Cooperative Shooting Range.
