= Pomeroy State Park =

State park in Connecticut, USA

- Location within Connecticut Location within the United States
- Location: Lebanon, Connecticut, United States
- Coordinates: 41°41′57″N 72°13′27″W
- Area: 200 acres (81 ha)
- Elevation: 499 ft (152 m)
- Established: 1953
- Administrator: Connecticut Department of Energy and Environmental Protection
- Designation: Connecticut state park
- Website: Official website

Pomeroy State Park is an undeveloped public recreation area covering 200 acres (81 ha) just south of Willimantic in the town of Lebanon, Connecticut, managed by the Connecticut Department of Energy and Environmental Protection. The state park is a forested area used for hiking and hunting with no formal entrance, markings, or parking that abuts preserved farmland.

== History ==
The park was established on the former 90-acre estate of textile manufacturer Charles Pomeroy for whom it is named. The park entered the rolls of the Connecticut State Register and Manual in 1953, when it was listed at 84 acres, that figure expanding to 104 acres ten years later. The state added 91 acres through two separate purchases in 2001 and another 2.3 acres in 2007.

== Terrain ==
The park preserves a forested area without formal entrance that shares a boundary with preserved farmland. The park is divided by Connecticut Route 289. The park includes the summit of 505-foot (154 m) Bush Hill, south of Hosmer Mountain (492 feet (150 m)). A 2005 property designation map from the Connecticut Department of Environmental Protection uses a portion of the Willimantic quadrangle map to show the hilly terrain on the northeast portion of the park and the top of Bush Hill to the northwest. The southern limits of the park are also hilly with a steeper elevation change at the edge of the southwest boundary.

== Activities ==
Hikers can ascend to the top of Bush Hill. In the fall, the park is open to archers hunting deer and turkey. The park can be accessed by parking along the side of Route 289 (Beaumont Highway).
