= Mohegan State Forest =

State forest in Connecticut, United States

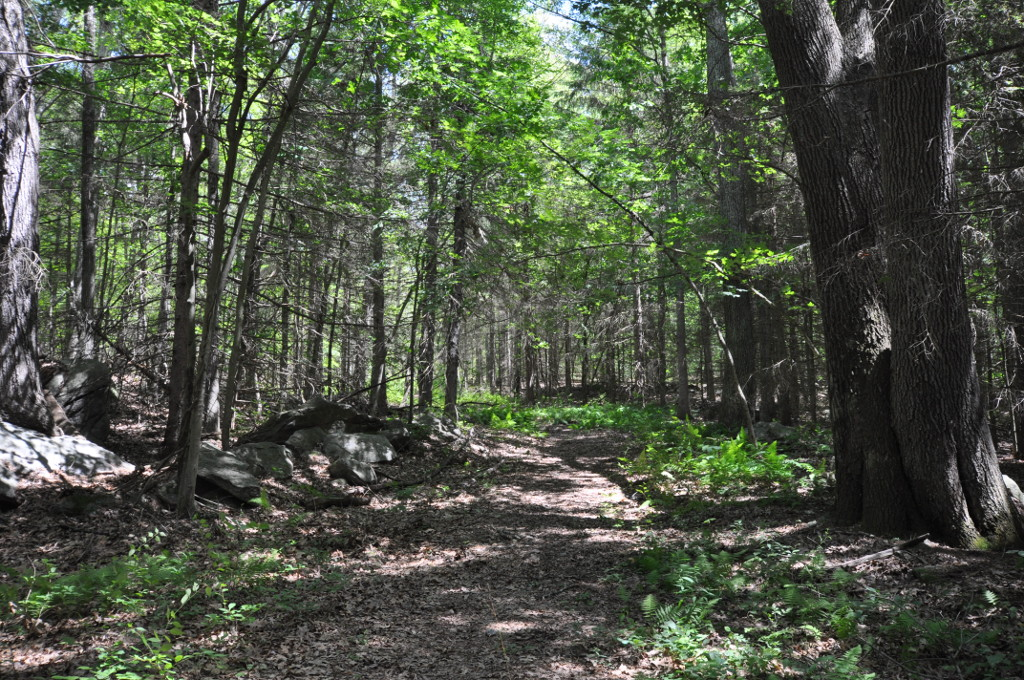

- Location within Connecticut Location within the United States
- Location: Scotland, Sprague, and Canterbury, Connecticut, United States
- Coordinates: 41°39′52″N 72°04′42″W
- Area: 956 acres (387 ha)
- Established: 1960
- Administrator: Connecticut Department of Energy and Environmental Protection
- Website: Mohegan State Forest

Mohegan State Forest is a Connecticut state forest located mainly in the town of Scotland with smaller parcels in Sprague and Canterbury. The forest was established through an initial donation of three hundred acres in 1960. A harvest of two hundred thousand board feet of sawtimber took place in 1988. The forest is open for hiking and hunting. Letterboxing is no longer active in the forest.
