= Mooween State Park =

State park in New London County, Connecticut

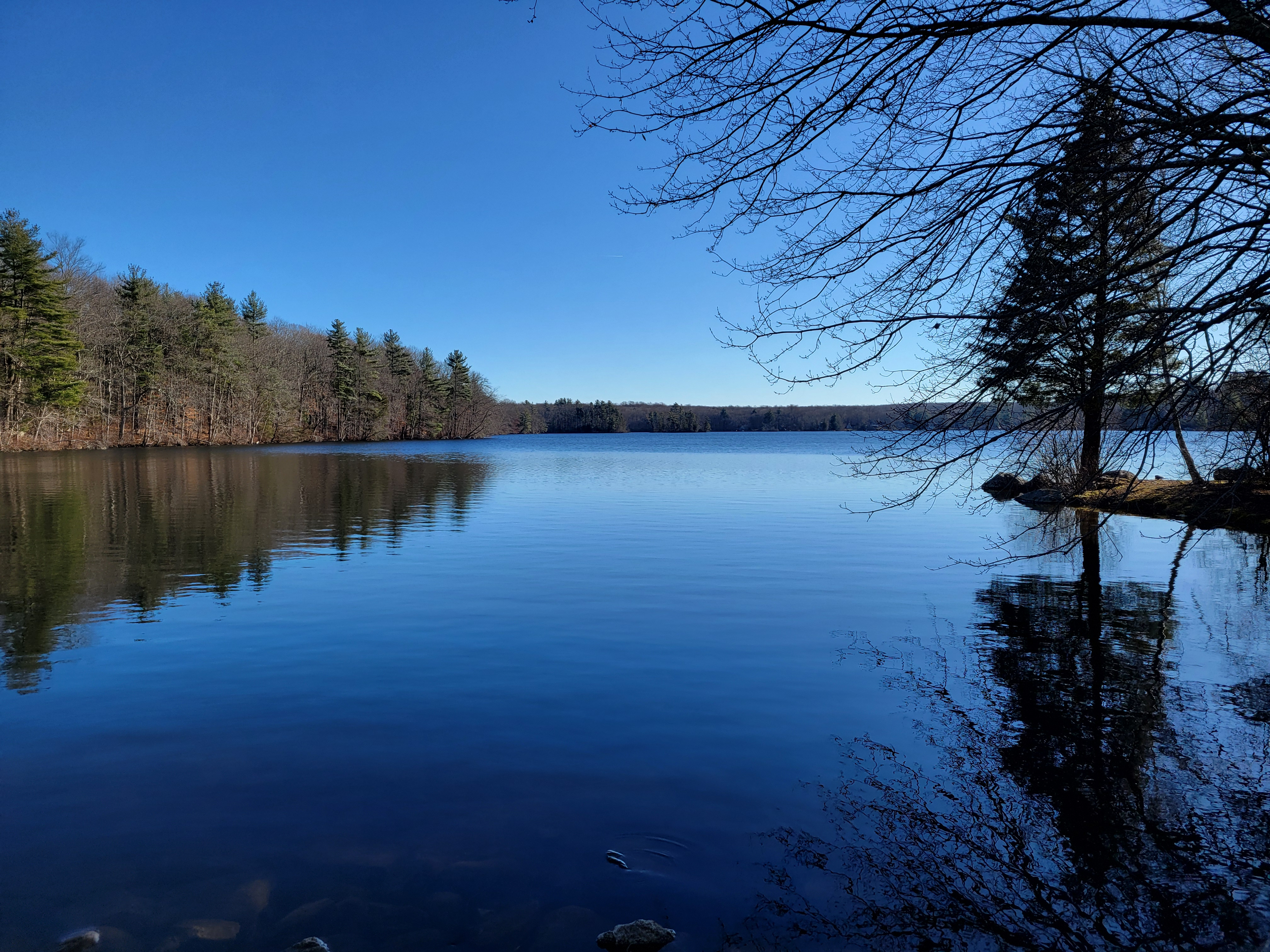
- Red Cedar Lake

- Location within Connecticut Location within the United States
- Location: Lebanon, Connecticut, United States
- Coordinates: 41°33′23″N 72°13′33″W
- Area: 577 acres (234 ha)
- Elevation: 459 ft (140 m)
- Designation: Connecticut state park
- Established: 1989
- Administrator: Connecticut Department of Energy and Environmental Protection
- Website: Mooween State Park

Mooween State Park is a public recreation area covering 577 acres (234 ha) in the town of Lebanon, Connecticut. The state park offers hiking and mountain biking plus fishing and boating on 127-acre (51 ha) Red Cedar Lake.

== History ==
The park grounds were the home of a summer camp for boys from 1921 through 1960. The state purchased the site in 1989. Originally known as Red Cedar Lake State Park, its name was changed to Mooween in 2000 in recognition of its summer camp past.
