= Stoddard Hill State Park =

State park in New London County, Connecticut

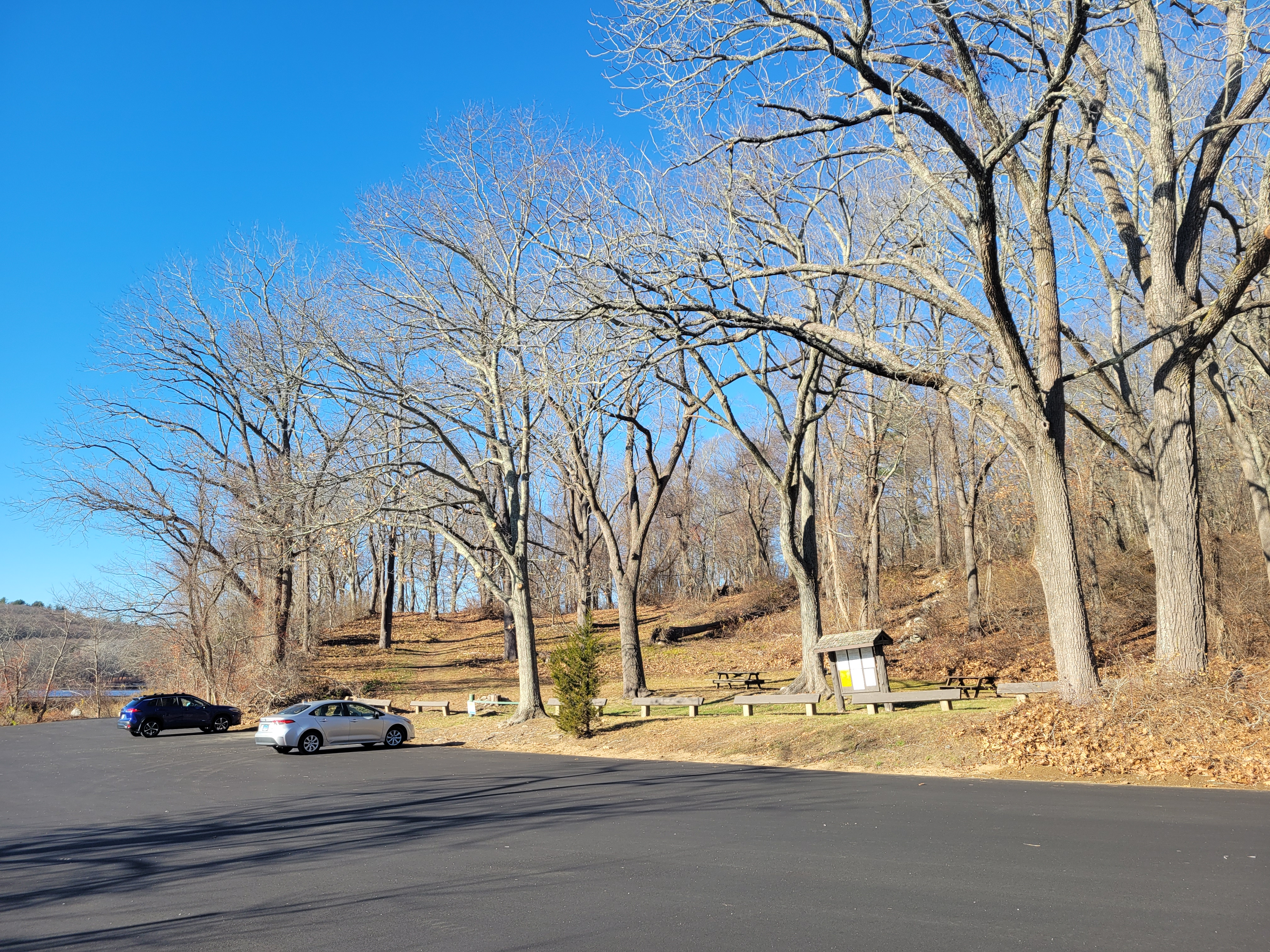

- Location within Connecticut Location within the United States
- Interactive map of Stoddard Hill State Park
- Location: Ledyard, Connecticut, United States
- Coordinates: 41°27′42″N 72°03′51″W
- Area: 55 acres (22 ha)
- Elevation: 180 ft (55 m)
- Established: 1954
- Administrator: Connecticut Department of Energy and Environmental Protection
- Website: Official website
- Connecticut state parks

Stoddard Hill State Park is a public recreation area located on the eastern shore of the Thames River, about five miles (8.0 km) south of Norwich, in the town of Ledyard, Connecticut. The state park covers 55 acres and offers facilities for boating, fishing, and hiking. It is managed by the Connecticut Department of Energy and Environmental Protection.

== History ==
The park was donated to the state in 1954. It is one of several Connecticut state parks that were acquired with funds bequeathed by George Dudley Seymour for the purpose of purchasing recreational areas for public use.

== Activities and amenities ==
The park includes a five-acre tidal estuary with ramp for car-top boating. A trail leads to the top of a 183-foot (56 m) hill that was used by Native Americans as a lookout.
