= Über alles (disambiguation) =

Über alles (German for above all) is a phrase from "Deutschlandlied", the German national anthem. It may also refer to:

- Über alles (album), 2003 album by Hanzel und Gretyl
- A novel by George Yury Right (Yuri Nesterenko) written from a point of view of a German officer.

== See also ==
- "California über alles", a song by the Dead Kennedys
- Über alles in der Welt, German title of the 1941 Nazi propaganda film Above All Else in the World
