= Beaver Brook State Park =

Public recreation area in Connecticut, United States

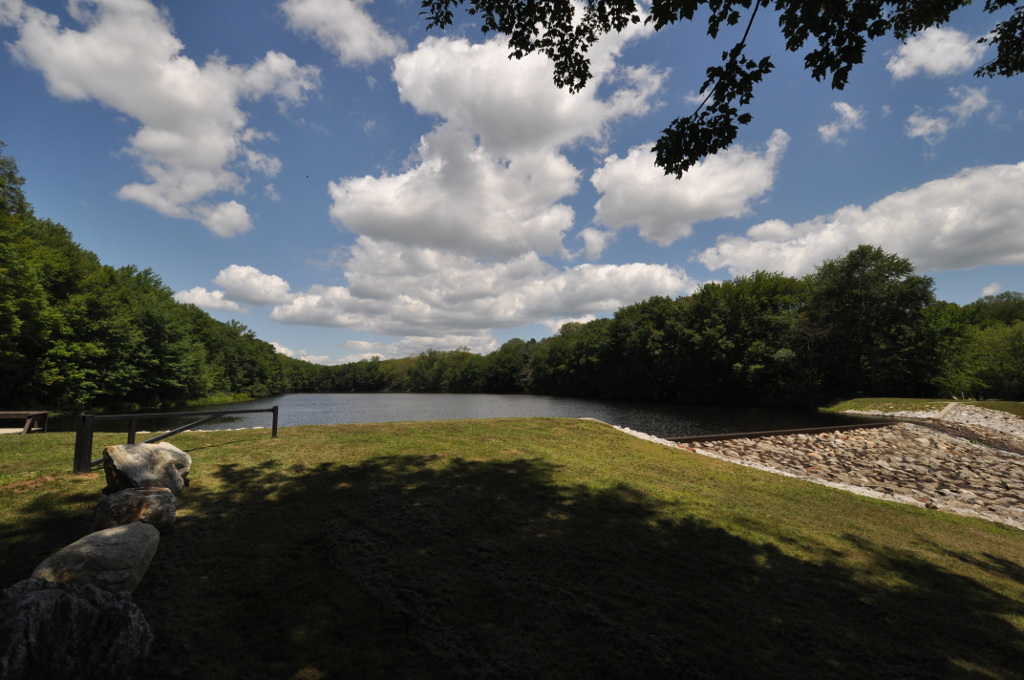
- Bibbins Pond

- Location within Connecticut
- Interactive map of Beaver Brook State Park
- Location: Chaplin & Windham, Connecticut, United States
- Coordinates: 41°44′27″N 72°07′53″W
- Area: 401 acres (162 ha)
- Elevation: 331 ft (101 m)
- Established: 1955
- Administrator: Connecticut Department of Energy and Environmental Protection
- Designation: Connecticut state park
- Website: Official website

Beaver Brook State Park is an undeveloped public recreation area covering 401 acres (162 ha) in the towns of Windham and Chaplin, Connecticut. The state park encompasses Bibbins Pond, also known as Beaver Brook Pond, as well as the acreage northward as far as the Air Line State Park Trail, which forms the park's northern boundary. The park is a walk-in facility, open for hunting and trout fishing, managed by the Connecticut Department of Energy and Environmental Protection.

== History ==
The park's name may derive from a once-present beaver pond. It was one of multiple public recreation areas acquired in the 1950s using funds bequeathed for that purpose by George Dudley Seymour. When the gift was announced in 1955, it was reported that trout pools had already been developed north of Bibbins Pond. The annually produced State Register and Manual noted the park's acreage at 165 acres in 1955, at 391 acres in 1957, and at 401 acres in 1960. The state record for brook trout was claimed for Bibbins Pond from 1994 to 1998.

== Activities and amenities ==
Bibbins Pond, known as Beaver Brook Pond, is the park's central feature, while Beaver Brook runs both north and south of the pond and continues beyond the park limits. Bibbins Pond's 20 acres (8.1 ha) offer a seasonal boat launch for non-motorized watercraft with fishing for trout, brown bullhead and sunfish. The park also includes a geocache which can be accessed via three different routes.
