= Connecticut Department of Energy and Environmental Protection =

State agency in the US state of Connecticut

- Headquarters in Hartford, CT (2026)

Environmental protection overview
- Formed: July 1, 2011
- Preceding agencies: Department of Environmental Protection; Department of Public Utility Control
- Jurisdiction: Government of Connecticut
- Headquarters: 79 Elm Street Hartford, Connecticut 06106-5127
- Minister responsible: Emma Cimino, Acting Commissioner
- Deputy Ministers responsible: Emma Cimino, Deputy Commissioner, Environmental Quality; Mason Trumble, Deputy Commissioner, Environmental Conservation; Joe DiNicola, Deputy Commissioner, Energy
- Website: portal.ct.gov/deep

The Connecticut Department of Energy and Environmental Protection (DEEP) is a state agency in the US state of Connecticut. The department oversees the state's natural resources and environment and regulates public utilities and energy policy. It is headquartered in Hartford.

The agency was created on July 1, 2011, in recognition of the interconnectivity of effective energy and environmental policies. Connecticut Governor Dannel P. Malloy, in conjunction with the Connecticut General Assembly, merged the Connecticut Department of Environmental Protection, the Connecticut Department of Public Utility Control, and an energy office within the Office of Policy and Management to create a single agency of the Department of Energy and Environmental Protection. Daniel C. Esty was appointed as commissioner of the DEEP upon its creation in July 2011. Rob Klee served as commissioner of the department from January 2014 through December 2018. Katie S. Dykes has served as commissioner since January 2019.

The law enforcement branch of DEEP is the Connecticut State Environmental Conservation Police. Officers were previously known as game wardens.

== See also ==
- Climate change in Connecticut
