= Butler-McCook Homestead =

Historic house in Connecticut, United States

- U.S. National Register of Historic Places
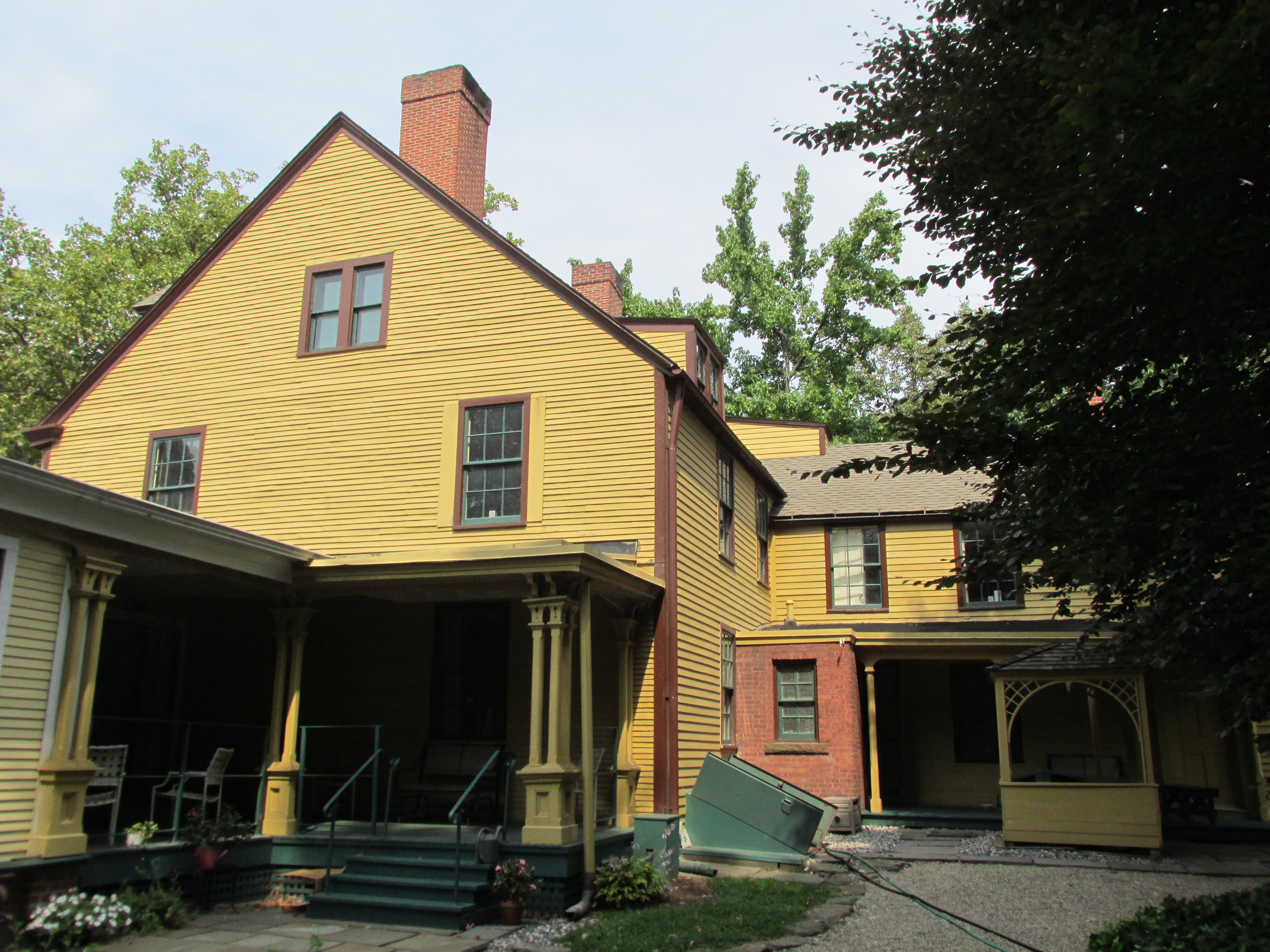
- Butler-McCook Homestead, rear view

- Location within Connecticut Location within the United States
- Location: 396 Main Street, Hartford, Connecticut
- Coordinates: 41°45′54″N 72°40′46″W
- Area: 2 acres (0.81 ha)
- Built: 1782
- Architect: Weidenman, Jacob
- Website: Butler-McCook House & Garden
- NRHP reference No.: 71000907
- Added to NRHP: March 11, 1971

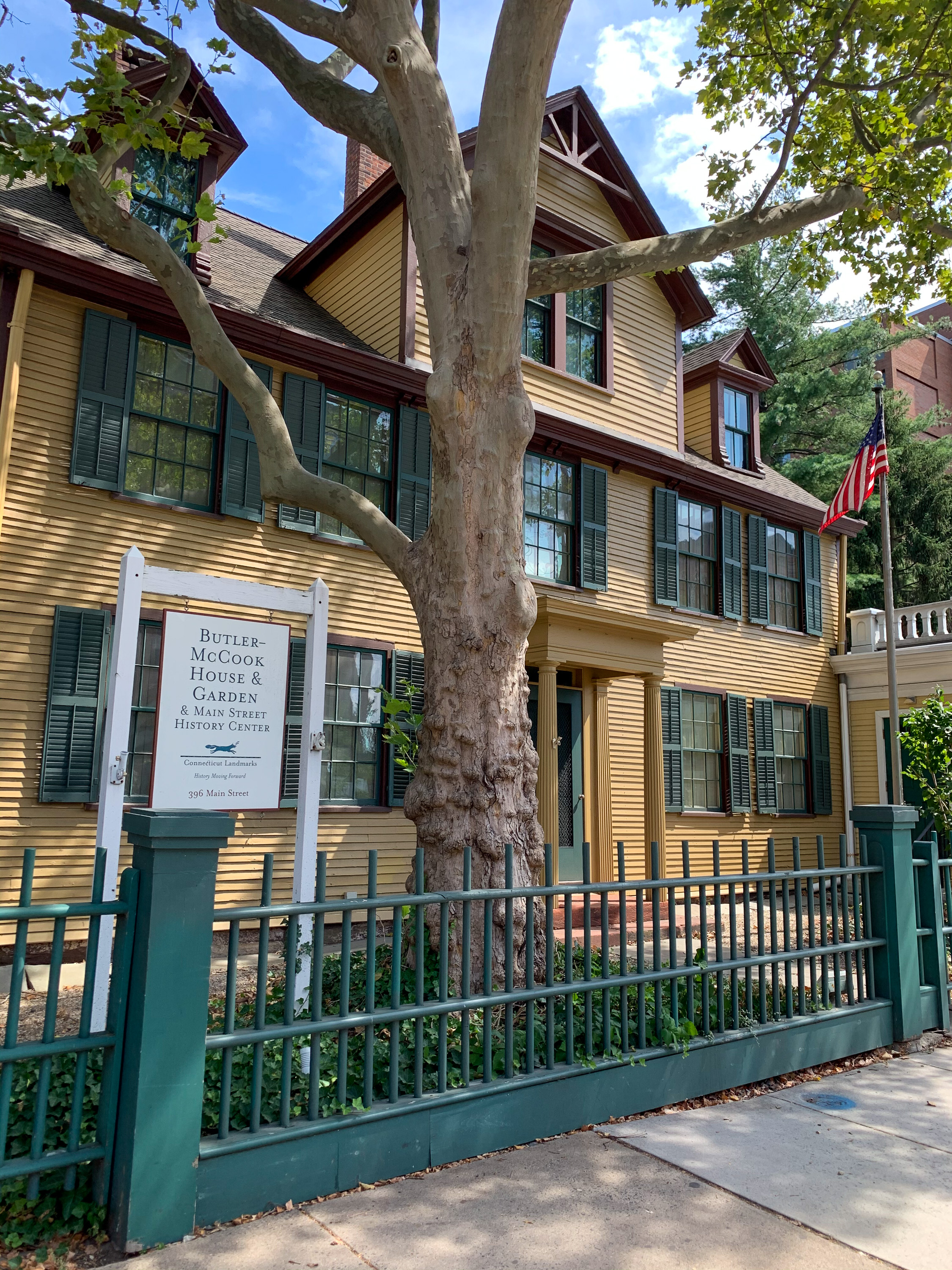
Street view

The Butler-McCook Homestead is a historic house museum at 396 Main Street in Hartford, Connecticut. Built in 1782, it is one of the city's few surviving 18th-century houses. It was listed on the National Register of Historic Places in 1971. It is now operated as the Butler-McCook House & Garden by Connecticut Landmarks.

== Description and history ==
The Butler-McCook Homestead is located south of downtown Hartford, on the east side of Main Street at the Pulaski Mall. It is a 2 1/2-story wood-frame structure, with a side-gable roof, clapboarded exterior, and twin interior chimneys. Its main facade is five bays wide, with a center entrance sheltered by a shallow projecting portico with round columns, hip roof, and projecting cornice. The front roof face is pierced by three dormers, two small ones flanking a large central one. The house's rear structure contains a colonial kitchen on the first floor, and the structure's second floor was added in the 19th century. The house stands on about 2 acres (0.81 ha) of land, part of which has formal gardens created by landscape architect Jacob Weidenman, the principal designer of Hartford's Bushnell Park. Attached to the right side of the house is a late 19th-century single-story structure.

The main house was built in 1782 for Dr. Daniel Butler, a physician who kept his consulting room here. Another resident of the house was Rev. John James McCook (professor) who was a professor at Trinity College (Connecticut) and the rector at St. John's Episcopal Church in East Hartford. His son, Dr. John Butler McCook, added the wing to the right to serve as his office in 1897. The house remained in the hands of Butler descendants for about two centuries, prior to its conversion to a museum. Its rooms now include displays of family memorabilia. The house reflects two centuries of ownership by one family, with furnishings and decorative items ranging from the Colonial through the Victorian eras. The house also features the Main Street History Center, with exhibits about Hartford's history.

== See also ==
- National Register of Historic Places listings in Hartford, Connecticut
- Amos Bull House, housing the offices of Connecticut Landmarks nearby

Connecticut Landmarks also operates other historic house museums, including:

- Amasa Day House in Moodus
- Bellamy-Ferriday House and Garden in Bethlehem
- Buttolph–Williams House in Wethersfield
- Hempsted Houses in New London
- Isham-Terry House in Hartford
- Nathan Hale Homestead in Coventry
- Phelps-Hatheway House & Garden in Suffield
