= Bellamy-Ferriday House and Garden =

Historic house in Connecticut, United States

- Joseph Bellamy House
- U.S. National Register of Historic Places
- U.S. Historic district – Contributing property
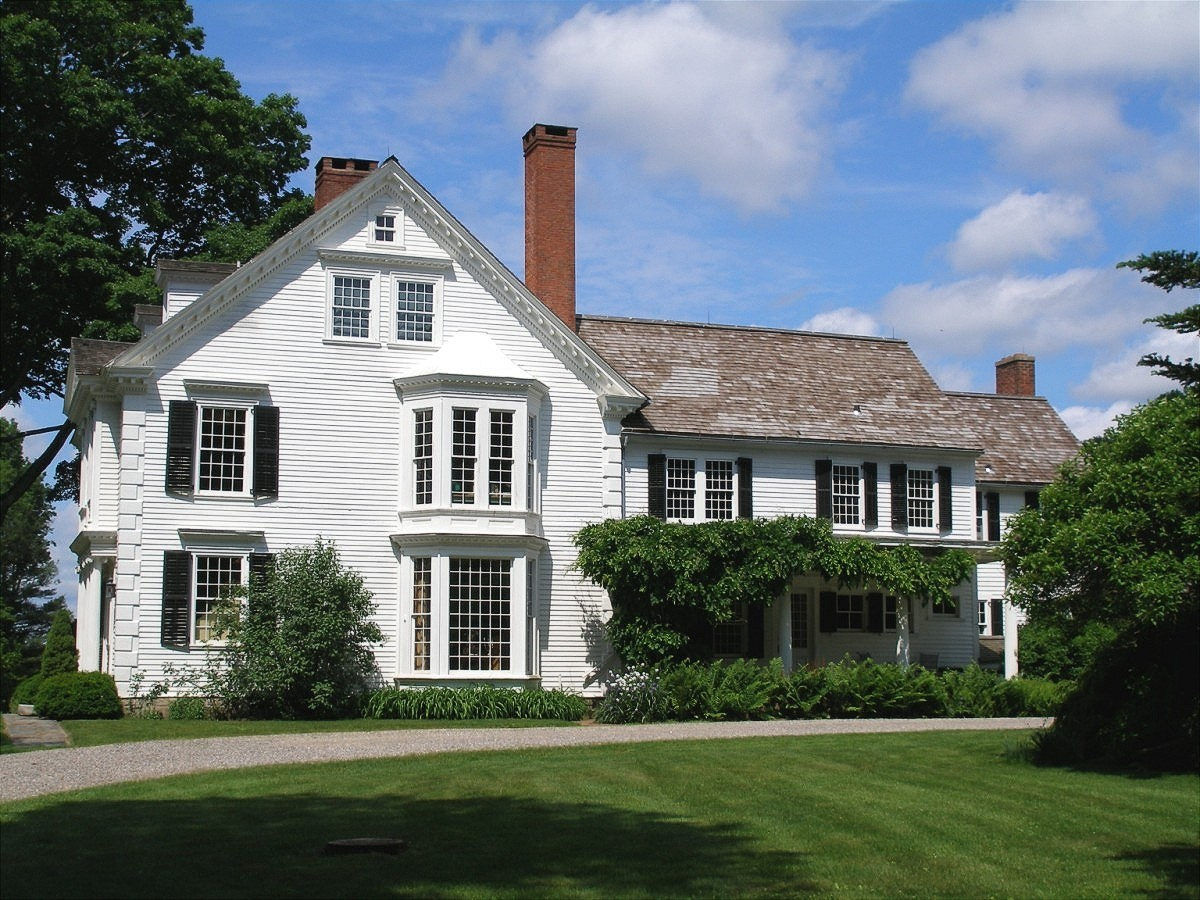
- Location: 9 Main Street North Connecticut Route 61, Bethlehem, Connecticut
- Coordinates: 41°38′42″N 73°12′32″W
- Area: 104 acres (42 ha)
- Built: 1760
- Architectural style: Colonial
- Website: Bellamy-Ferriday House and Garden
- Part of: Bethlehem Green Historic District (ID82001001)
- NRHP reference No.: 82004444

Significant dates
- Added to NRHP: April 12, 1982
- Designated CP: December 16, 1982

The Bellamy-Ferriday House and Garden (also known as the Joseph Bellamy House) is a historic house museum at 9 Main Street North Connecticut Route 61 in Bethlehem, Connecticut. The main house was built between about 1754 and 1767 by the Rev. Joseph Bellamy, a prominent Congregationalist minister who played an influential role in the First Great Awakening. The property, the National Register of Historic Places in 1982. The house and surrounding gardens are owned and operated by Connecticut Landmarks; admission is charged. Another 81 acres of forest and fields adjacent to the museum property are maintained as Bellamy Preserve, the town of Bethlehem's "Central Park," by the Bethlehem Land Trust.

== Description and history ==
The Bellamy-Ferriday House is located just north of the village green in the center of Bethlehem. Its landscaped acreage is screened from the green by mature trees, and is accessed via a drive on Main Street North (Connecticut Route 61). The house consists of a 2 1/2-story main block, oriented facing south, with a two-story ell and modern wing to the north. The main block is roughly square, and is topped by a gabled roof with a central chimney and gabled dormers. Its exterior is finished in wooden clapboards with corner quoin blocks, and there is a projecting two-story entry section in the rightmost bay. It has a Palladian window in the second floor, and a shallow portico supported by four fluted Ionic columns.

Reverend Joseph Bellamy was granted 104 acres (42 ha) of land on the north side of what is now Bethlehem village (it was then known as the North Purchase of Woodbury, incorporated as Bethlehem 1787) in 1738, when he became the North Purchase parish's first settled minister. Through the 1740s and 1750s Bellamy rose in prominence as one of the leading theologians of the First Great Awakening. The traditional history of this house is that its ell was built about 1754 on land Bellamy purchased in 1741 that stood adjacent to his large tract, and is where his family lived while the main block was built. The ell lacks evidence of a chimney adequate for cooking and heating, however, and it is more likely the house was built and occupied around 1760. Later, Henry Ferriday bought the property; his daughter, Caroline Woolsey Ferriday, owned it until her death in 1990. Under the terms of her will, the house and several surrounding acres were subsequently turned into a small museum by the Antiquarian and Landmarks Society, now known as Connecticut Landmarks.

The museum features American and European antiques and a formal parterre garden with a collection of roses, peonies and lilacs. A weeping willow on the property once stood at the grave of Napoleon Bonaparte.

== See also ==
- National Register of Historic Places listings in Litchfield County, Connecticut

Connecticut Landmarks also operates other historic house museums, including:

- Amasa Day House in Moodus
- Butler-McCook House & Garden in Hartford
- Buttolph–Williams House in Wethersfield
- Hempsted Houses in New London
- Isham-Terry House in Hartford
- Nathan Hale Homestead in Coventry
- Phelps-Hatheway House & Garden in Suffield
