= Buttolph–Williams House =

Historic house in Connecticut, United States

- U.S. National Register of Historic Places
- U.S. National Historic Landmark
- U.S. Historic district – Contributing property
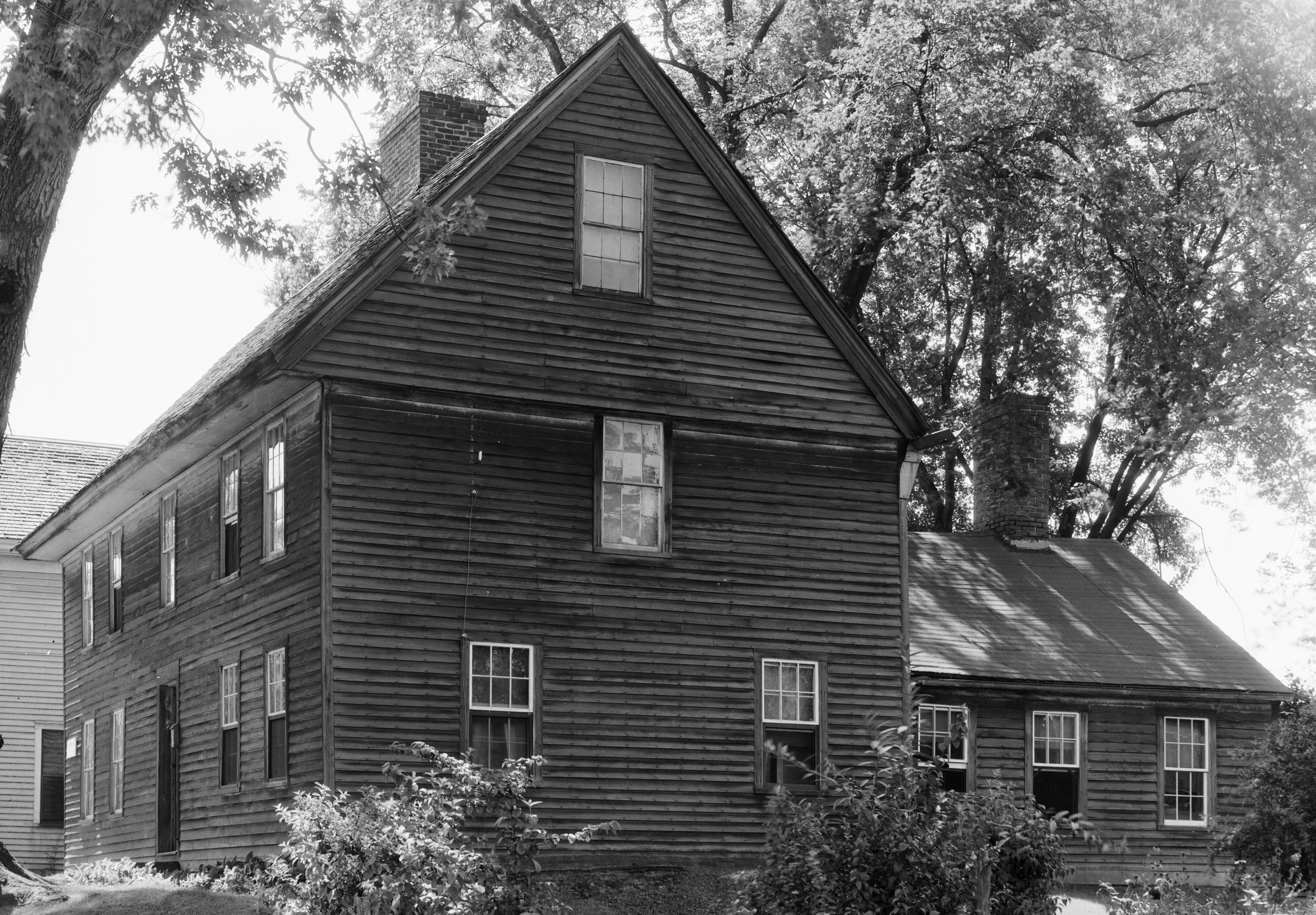
- HABS photo of the house in 1938, prior to its restoration

- Location within Connecticut Location within the United States
- Location: 249 Broad Street, Wethersfield, Connecticut
- Coordinates: 41°42′39″N 72°39′4″W
- Area: 2 acres (0.81 ha)
- Built: 1711
- Architectural style: Colonial
- Part of: Old Wethersfield Historic District (ID70000719)
- NRHP reference No.: 68000048

Significant dates
- Added to NRHP: November 24, 1968
- Designated NHL: November 24, 1968
- Designated CP: December 29, 1970

The Buttolph–Williams House is a historic house museum at 249 Broad Street in Wethersfield, Connecticut. Built in 1711, it is one of the oldest surviving houses in the town. It is owned by Connecticut Landmarks, a historic preservation organization, and is open for regular tours between May and October. it was designated a National Historic Landmark in 1968 for its significance as an extremely well-preserved example of early colonial architecture.

== Description and history ==
The Buttolph–Williams House is a 2 1/2-story timber-frame structure, three bays wide and one deep, with a steeply pitched side-gable roof and a large central chimney. A 1 1/2-story addition, with its own chimney, extends to the rear of the house. The main entrance, centered on the front facade, is unadorned. The other bays of the main facade are filled with diamond-pane windows that are a reconstruction of the original size and placement of windows when the house was built. The upper story hangs over the lower one by a few inches, built in a way that indicates it is a false overhang done for decorative rather than architectural reasons. The siding is reproduction split wood siding, manufactured in the 20th century using techniques similar to those employed at the turn of the 18th century. The interior has also undergone a careful restoration, and now houses furnishings and artifacts appropriate to the period of its construction.

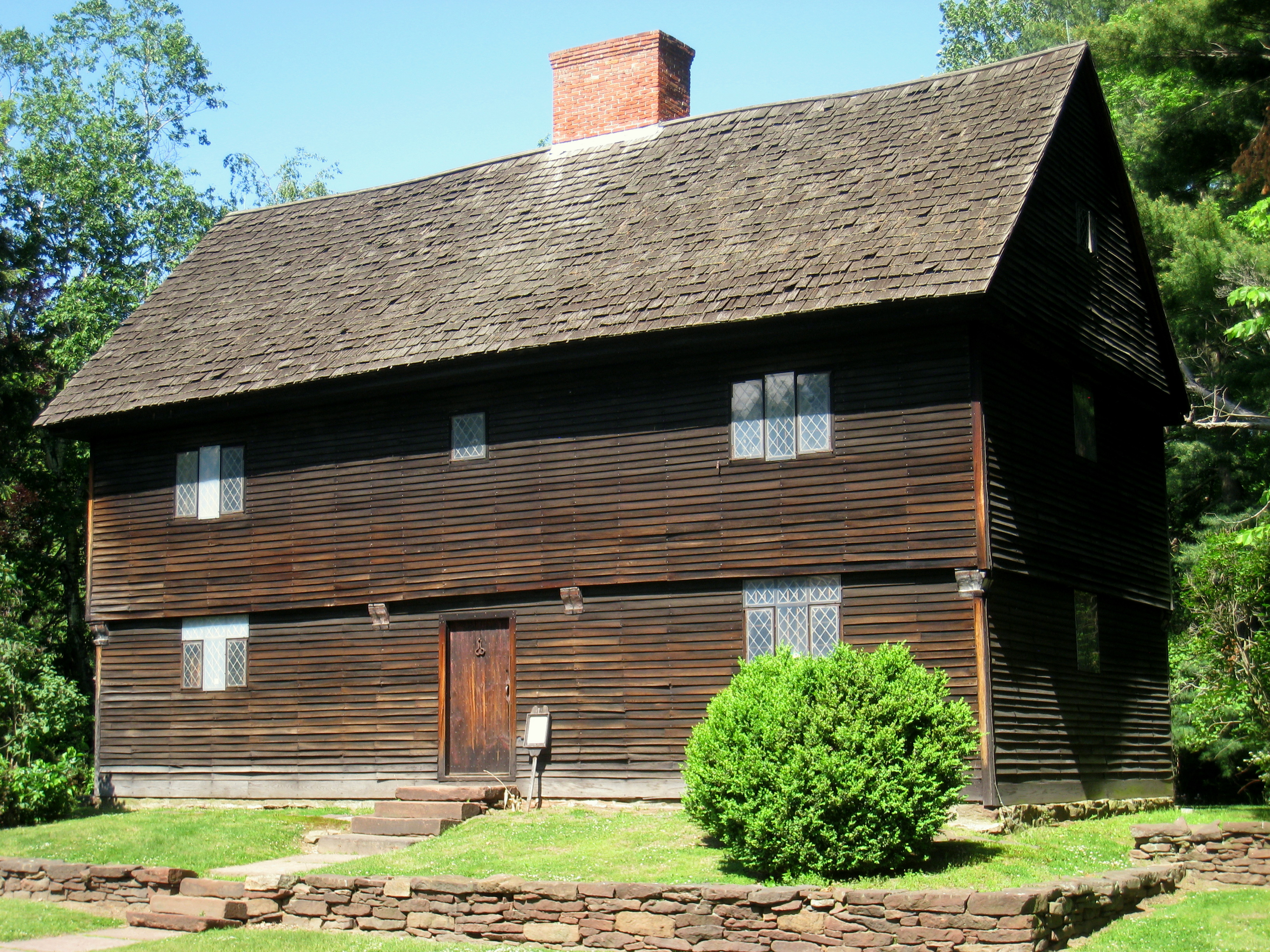
The house after restoration, in 2009

Although once thought to have been built between 1692 and 1698, more recent research has dated its construction to c. 1711. The house underwent a careful restoration in 1947, led by architect Frederick C. Palmer, in which much of its original material was preserved. The property opened as a museum in 1951, and is now operated by the nearby Webb-Deane-Stevens Museum, although ownership remains with Connecticut Landmarks. The house plays a role in the Newbery Medal-winning book The Witch of Blackbird Pond, by Elizabeth George Speare.

The house was declared a National Historic Landmark and listed on the National Register of Historic Places in 1968.

== See also ==
- List of the oldest buildings in Connecticut
- List of National Historic Landmarks in Connecticut
- National Register of Historic Places listings in Hartford County, Connecticut

Connecticut Landmarks also operates other historic house museums, including:

- Amasa Day House in Moodus
- Bellamy-Ferriday House and Garden in Bethlehem
- Butler-McCook House & Garden in Hartford
- Hempsted Houses in New London
- Isham-Terry House in Hartford
- Nathan Hale Homestead in Coventry
- Phelps-Hatheway House & Garden in Suffield
