= Strong House (Coventry, Connecticut) =

Historic house in Connecticut, United States

- U.S. National Register of Historic Places
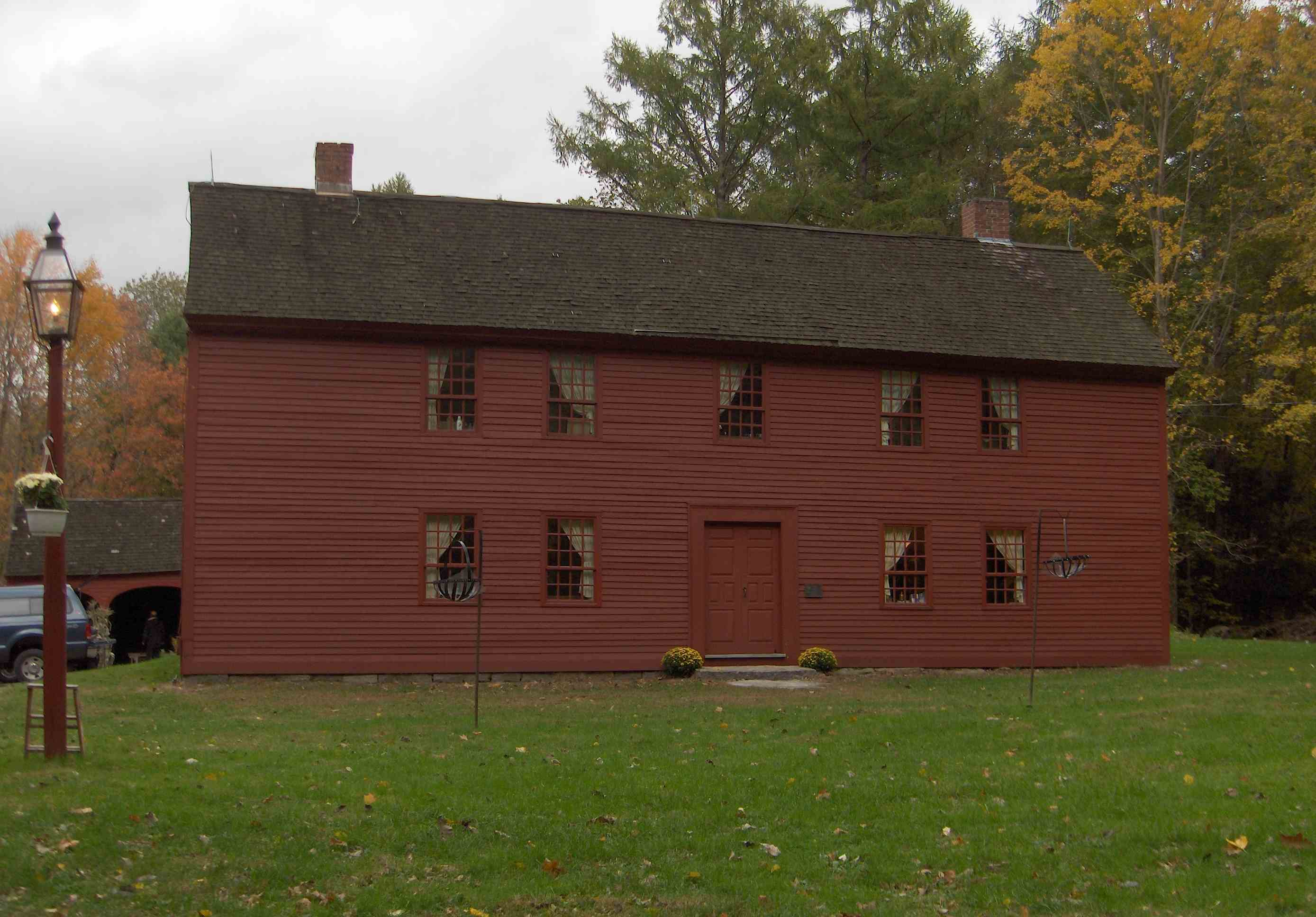

- Location within Connecticut Location within the United States
- Location: 2382 South Street, Coventry, Connecticut
- Coordinates: 41°45′58″N 72°20′55″W
- Area: 4 acres (1.6 ha)
- Built: 1710
- NRHP reference No.: 87001906
- Added to NRHP: January 15, 1988

The Strong House, now the Strong-Porter Museum, is a historic house museum at 2382 South Street in Coventry, Connecticut. It is a 2 1/2-story wood-frame structure, five bays wide, with a center entry and two interior chimneys. The oldest portion of the house is estimated to date to 1710, early in the period of Coventry's settlement, and retains a significant number of period features. The house was listed on the National Register of Historic Places in 1988. It is now owned and operated by the Coventry Historical Society as a museum. In addition to exhibits in the house about local history, visitors can tour the carpenter shop, 19th century privy, carriage sheds and barn.

== Description and history ==
The Strong-Porter Museum is located in southwestern Coventry, on the north side of South Street, on the eastern fringe of Nathan Hale State Forest and just west of the Nathan Hale Homestead, also a museum. The house is a 2 1/2-story wood-frame structure, with a side-gable roof, two interior chimneys, and clapboarded exterior. The main facade is five bays wide, with a slightly off-center arrangement around a nearly-centered entrance. The entrance has a wide panel door framed by a plain surround with back molding. The window placement on either side does not extend the typical width of a house of this age, with wide blank spaces between the outer windows and the building corners. The interior of the house is reflective of its construction history, with the oldest portion east of the entrance. The main parlor on that side has exposed beams, wide paneled wainscoting, and a fireplace cupboard that suggests a chimney stood here that was once much larger. The western parlor shows original woodwork, doors, and hardware suggestive of a later 18th century construction date, c. 1770.

The east portion of the house appears to have been built about 1710. The house was later extended to its present width, and the rear leanto was also added later, giving the house a classic saltbox appearance. The Strong house at one time belonged to the grandparents of American Revolutionary War hero Nathan Hale, whose homestead is nearby. Both houses were restored in the 1930s by noted antiquarian George Dudley Seymour, and represent some of Connecticut's earliest efforts at the historic preservation of colonial architecture. Seymour left this house, as well as land making up part of the adjacent state forest, to the state. The house is now managed by the local historical society as a museum.

== See also ==
- National Register of Historic Places listings in Tolland County, Connecticut
- List of the oldest buildings in Connecticut
