= Carolyn Ferriday =

American philanthropist

Caroline Woolsey Ferriday
- Born: July 3, 1902
- Died: April 24, 1990 (aged 87); Bethlehem, Connecticut
- Occupation(s): Actress, Philanthropist
- Parent(s): Henry Farriday (father), Eliza Woolsey Farriday (mother)

Caroline Woolsey Ferriday (July 3, 1902 – April 24, 1990) was an American philanthropist known for her efforts during World War II and the period after. She is best known for bringing the plight of the "Rabbits", or "Lapins", Polish women subjected to medical experimentation by the Nazis at Ravensbrück concentration camp, to the American public.

== Biography ==
=== Early life ===
Caroline Ferriday was born on July 3, 1902, to Henry and Eliza Ferriday. In 1912 her parents purchased what is now known as the Bellamy-Ferriday House where the family would spend their summers, after spending their winters in New York City.

=== Acting career ===
Caroline Ferriday's acting debut was in Shakespeare's the Merchant of Venice, in the role of Balthazar.

=== Philanthropic work ===
Ferriday volunteered at the French Embassy in New York and was involved with the Association des Déportées et Internées Résistantes (ADIR), to provide relief to French orphans.

==== The "Rabbits" of Ravensbrück ====
Ferriday approached Norman Cousins to write an article in Friends Journal to raise awareness and charitable funds for the survivors of the Nazi medical experiments at Ravensbrück concentration camp. She brought 35 of the surviving Rabbits to the United States for reconstructive surgery. She visited Warsaw, Poland in 1958 to meet the women and make initial preparation for their trip, and visited again that same year with Dr. William Hitzig, who had also aided the Hiroshima Maidens, for a medical assessment of their needs. She wrote three articles about the Rabbits who considered her to be a dear friend, even calling her 'godmother'. The women visited from December 1958 to December 1959 and went all over the country, staying with host-families and received their medical procedures, and Caroline herself hosting four women for Christmas. In the summer of 1959, they met up for a cross-country trip, touring all the way from San Francisco to New York City, with a special stop in Washington, D.C., where they had a special luncheon with Senators and Representatives. Caroline continued to have contact with several of the women after they left the United States.

=== Death and afterward ===
Caroline Ferriday died on April 24, 1990 (aged 87), and had a memorial service at Bethlehem's Christ Church the following day. She left her home, the Bellamy-Ferriday House and Garden to Connecticut Landmarks and the land to Bethlehem Land Trust. She is one of three protagonists in Martha Hall Kelly's World War II historical fiction novel, Lilac Girls.

== Honours, decorations, awards, and distinctions ==
Ferriday was awarded the Cross of Lorraine and the Legion of Honor by the French government in the 1950s for her support of the French Resistance and her work with the survivors of Ravensbrück concentration camp.
