= Nathan Hale Homestead =

Historic house in Connecticut, United States

- U.S. National Register of Historic Places
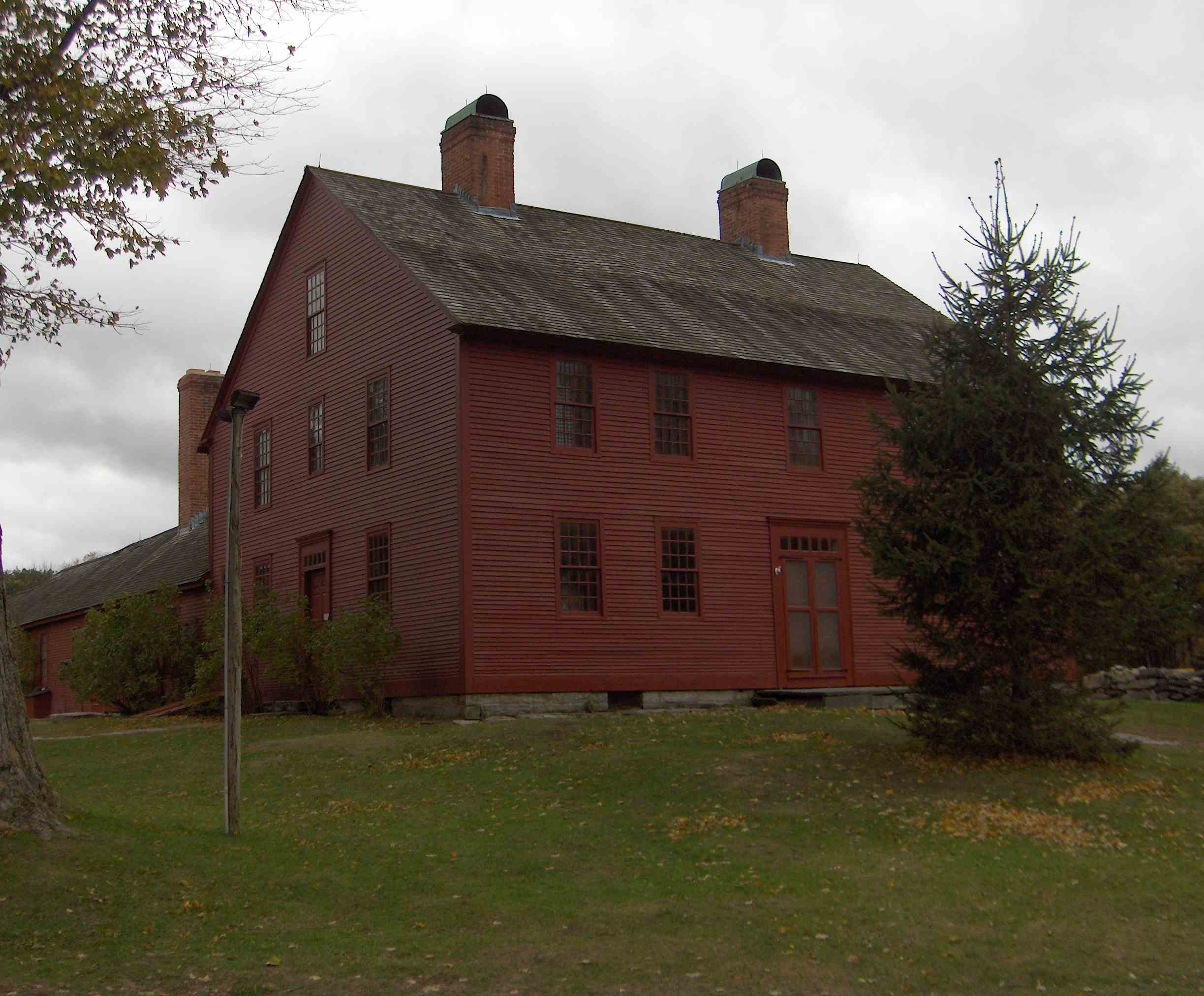
- Location: Coventry, Connecticut
- Coordinates: 41.7651°N 72.3464°W
- Built: 1739
- NRHP reference No.: 70000698
- Added to NRHP: October 22, 1970

The Nathan Hale Homestead is a historic home located at 2299 South Street in Coventry, Connecticut, United States. It was added to the National Register of Historic Places in 1970, and was also known as Dacon Richard Hale House.

Connecticut Landmarks operates the house as a late 18th-century historic house museum. As of 2011 they were working with the attorney general's office on an investigation into their alleged neglect of some of their sites and artifacts.

== Nathan Hale ==
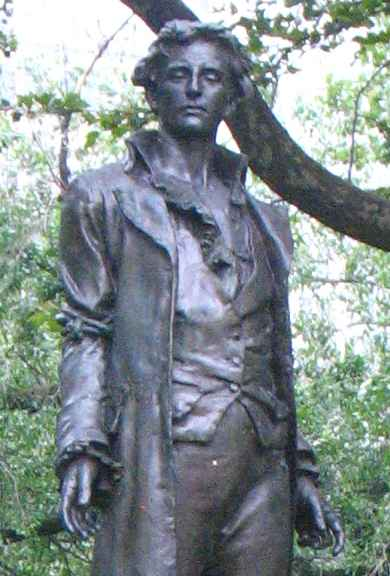
A statue of Nathan Hale in City Hall Park, New York

Nathan Hale was a spy for the American Continental forces during the American Revolutionary War. A graduate of Yale, he taught school for two years, first in East Haddam, then in New London.

After being captured by the British, Hale reportedly gave a speech stating that his only regret was that he had but one life to give for his country.

After he was hanged, his body was not returned and was never found. There is a monument to him in a cemetery in his hometown of Coventry, Connecticut.

Nathan Hale is Connecticut's state hero.

== The house ==
Despite the name of the property, Nathan Hale never lived in the house that is named for him. As a child, he did live in a home that was located in the same spot. This house was razed by his parents in order to create a larger living space for the family.

News of Nathan's death came when his family grew concerned for his well-being. His brother traveled from Coventry to Old Saybrook to meet with the army and inquire about Nathan's whereabouts. He was informed that Nathan had been killed and was given a trunk of his belongings. This trunk is in the house.

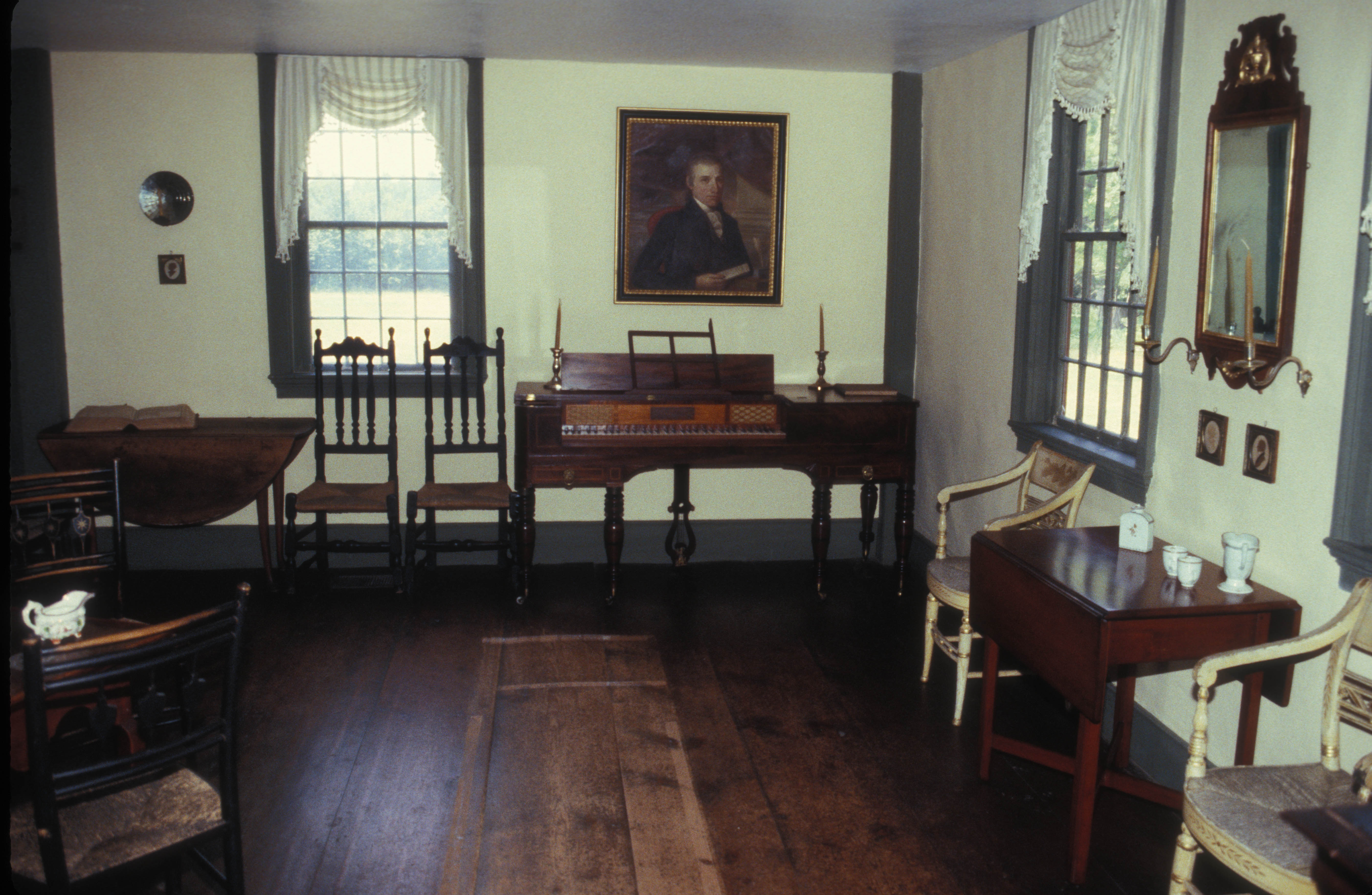
Interior of the house

After the Hale family, the house was sold to a series of other families who used it as a private residence, and the story of Nathan Hale became forgotten as just another story of a fallen soldier. However, a Connecticut lawyer named George Dudley Seymour became fascinated by the story while living in New Haven and was instrumental in the effort to recognize Hale's efforts. After championing the cause of erecting a statue of Nathan Hale at Yale University, Seymour learned that the farm in Coventry, which had been owned by Nathan's father, the Reverend Deacon Richard Hale, was for sale and in disrepair. He purchased the property in 1914 and restored the house to its original dignity, furnishing it with Connecticut antiques and artifacts, including Nathan's trunk.

In addition, he purchased the property across the street. Named the Strong-Porter House, it was the home of Nathan's grandmother, and is also a museum and on the list of National Registered Historic Places.

In a further effort to recognize Nathan Hale's sacrifice, Seymour also convinced the federal government to print a Nathan Hale postage stamp in 1925. The stamp was designed by artist Bela Lyon Pratt, who also created the statue of Nathan at Fort Nathan Hale in New Haven.

== Claimed hauntings ==
Seymour was of the belief that the homestead was haunted. According to a diary entry, he and a friend reportedly viewed the spirit of Reverend Deacon Hale through a window one rainy night. Also believed to be in residence is the spirit of Lydia Carpenter, a servant of the Hale family, and of Joseph Hale, Nathan's brother.

Mary Elizabeth Campbell Griffith, the widow of a former caretaker of the homestead, believed that the house might have been haunted by John and Sarah Hale, Nathan's brother and sister-in-law.

== The property ==
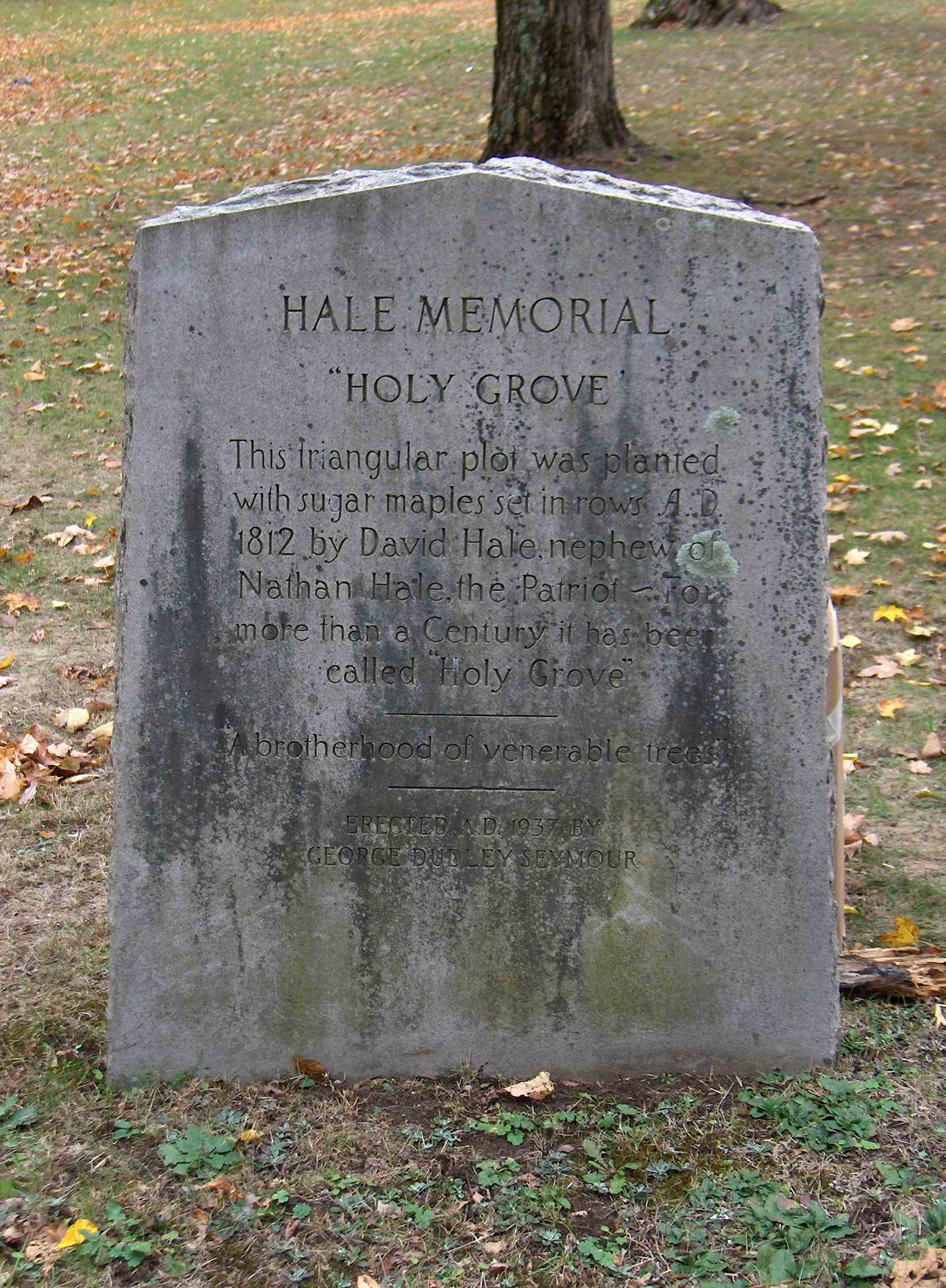
Stone marker explaining Holy Grove

Surrounding the house is the Nathan Hale State Forest, maintained by the Connecticut Department of Energy and Environmental Protection.

Next to the house is a cornfield that is planted in most years. In October, friends of the Hale Homestead put on a haunted corn maze.

In front of the homestead is a triangular grassy plot of land containing maple trees planted by Nathan's nephew David Hale Junior in 1812. The area has come to be known as the Holy Grove, in part because neighbors used to hold prayer meetings there.

Since 2004, the Homestead property has also been home to the Coventry Farmers' Market. The market operates annually from the first Sunday in June through the last Sunday in October. It is considered to be the largest farmers' market in the State of Connecticut.

== See also ==
- Captain Nathan Hale Monument, also NRHP-listed
- National Register of Historic Places listings in Tolland County, Connecticut
- Connecticut Landmarks also operates other historic house museums, including:
  - Bellamy-Ferriday House and Garden in Bethlehem
  - Butler-McCook House & Garden in Hartford
  - Buttolph–Williams House in Wethersfield
  - Hempsted Houses in New London
  - Isham-Terry House in Hartford
  - Phelps-Hatheway House & Garden in Suffield
