= Elias Sprague House =

Historic house in Connecticut, United States

- U.S. National Register of Historic Places
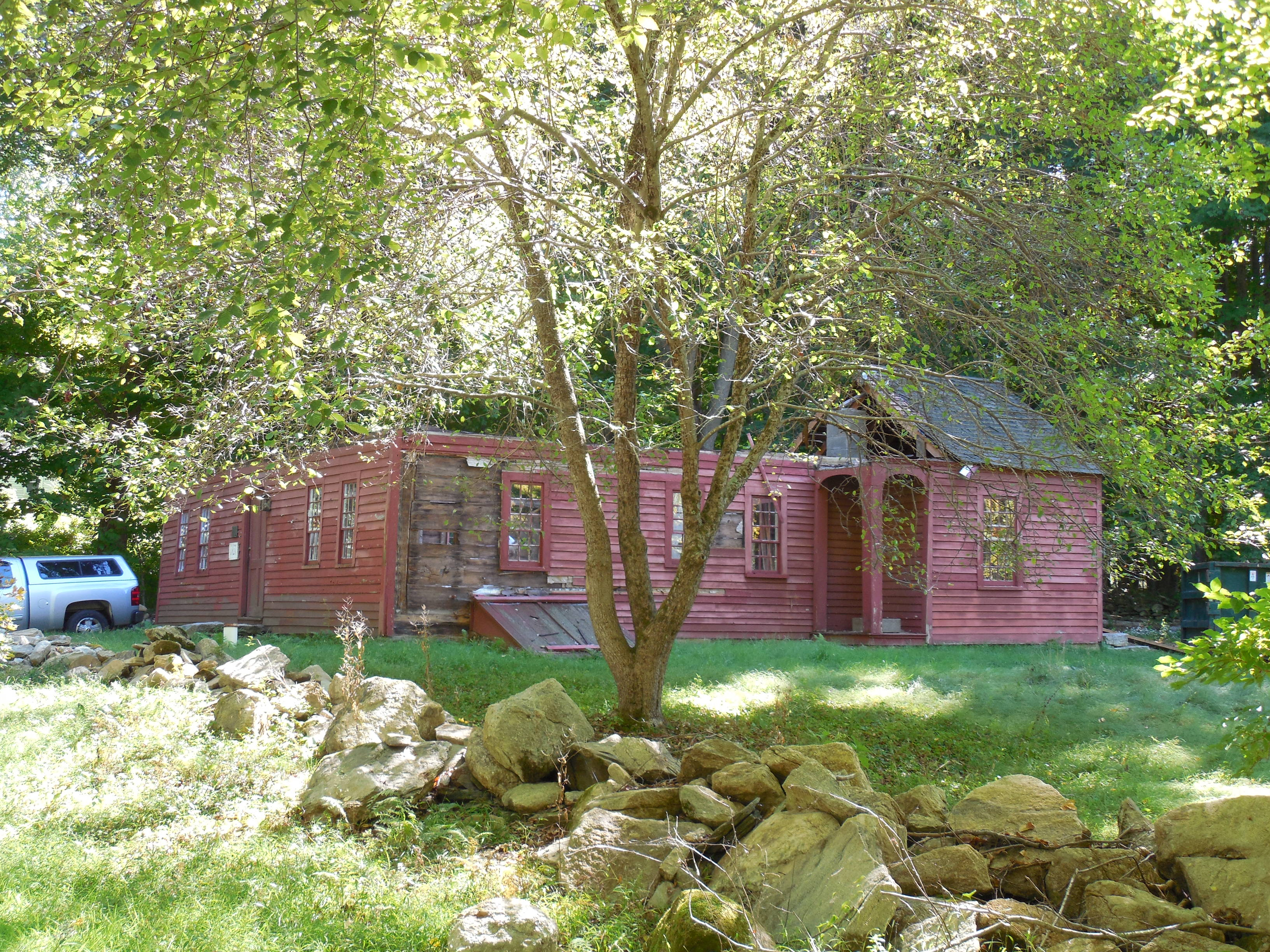
- Elias Sprague House, under renovation

- Location within Connecticut Location within the United States
- Location: 2187 South Street, Coventry, Connecticut
- Coordinates: 41°45′56″N 72°20′29″W
- Area: 4 acres (1.6 ha)
- Built: 1821
- Architectural style: Federal
- NRHP reference No.: 87001910
- Added to NRHP: November 2, 1987

The Elias Sprague House is a historic house at 2187 South Street in Coventry, Connecticut. Built in 1821, it is a well-preserved example of a vernacular early 19th-century Connecticut home. Now privately owned, the house for a time housed the local historical society. The house was listed on the National Register of Historic Places in 1987.

== Description and history ==
The Elias Sprague House is located in a rural setting in southwestern Coventry, on the south side of South Street a short way east of Nathan Hale State Forest. It is a 1 1/2-story wood frame Cape style house, with a gabled roof, central chimney, and clapboarded exterior. Its main facade is five bays wide, with a center entrance. The interior follows a typical central chimney plan, with a narrow entrance vestibule, parlors on either side of the chimney, and the kitchen behind it. Original period features include wooden paneling and trim, and several doors with original strap hinges.

The house was built in 1821, and is a well-preserved example of vernacular country architecture of the period. It was owned during the early 20th century by George Dudley Seymour, a noted antiquarian. The house was later acquired from the town by the Coventry Historical Society, which restored the house in 1964-1965 and operated it as a historic house site.

In 2008, the historical society placed the house on the market, having outgrown its use as a meeting space, a move that elicited some controversy. The town had given it the property with the proviso that it operate it as a museum, and arguments were made that the historical society was therefore not permitted to sell it. The State Property Review Board unanimously approved the sale of the property for residential use in 2011. The restored and expanded property is now privately owned.

== See also ==
- National Register of Historic Places listings in Tolland County, Connecticut
