= George Dudley Seymour State Park =

State park in Middlesex County, Connecticut

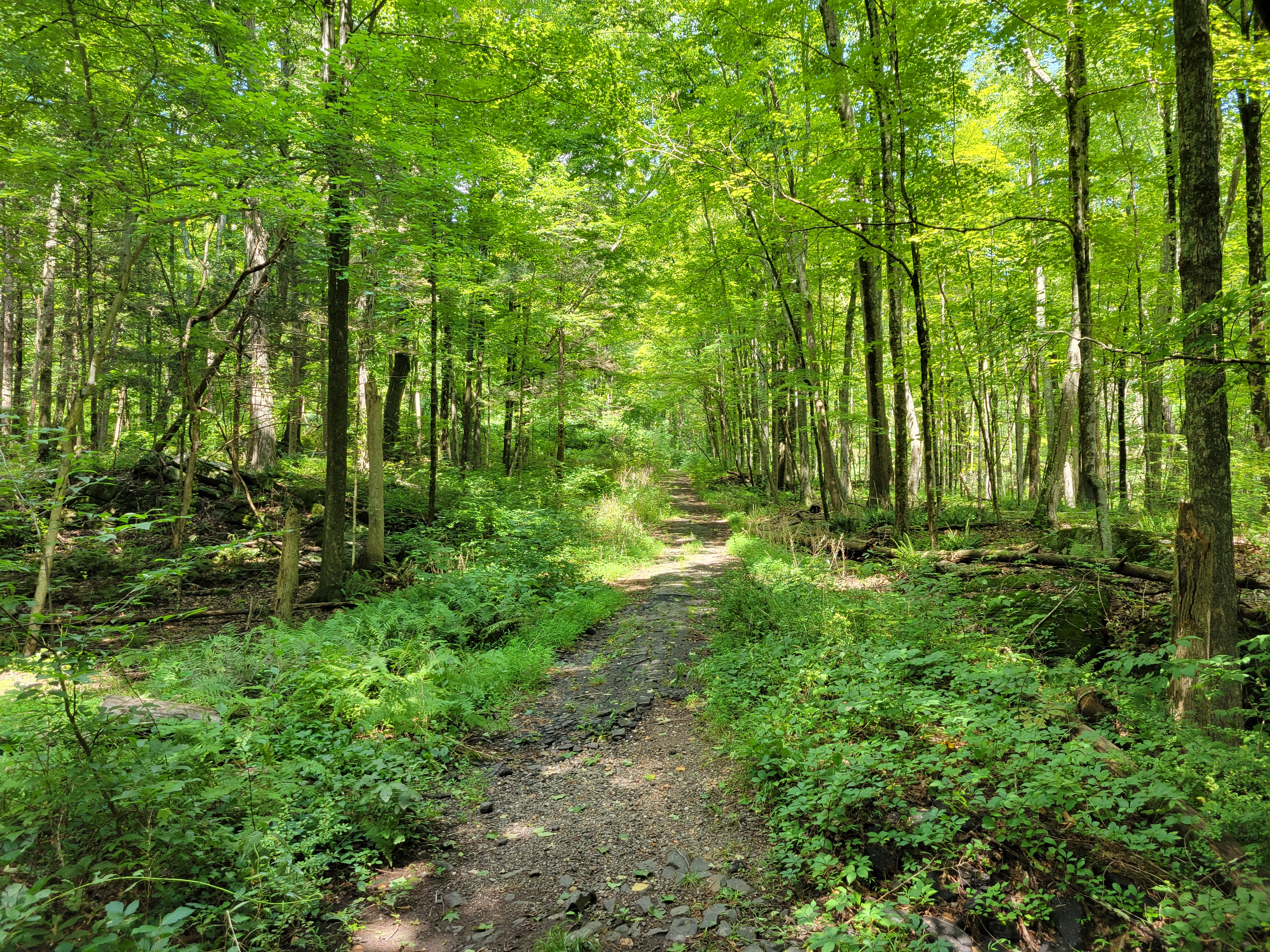
- Clarkhurst Road (now a trail)

- Location within Connecticut Location within the United States
- Location: Haddam, Connecticut, United States
- Coordinates: 41°30′32″N 72°32′35″W
- Area: 222 acres (90 ha)
- Elevation: 131 ft (40 m)
- Designation: Connecticut state park
- Established: 1960
- Administrator: Connecticut Department of Energy and Environmental Protection
- Website: George Dudley Seymour State Park

George Dudley Seymour State Park is a public recreation area occupying 222 acres (90 ha) on the east bank of the Connecticut River in the town of Haddam, Connecticut. Hurd State Park abuts the park to the north. The park bears the name of George Dudley Seymour (1859-1945), whose philanthropic efforts enabled the state to purchase land for this and several other Connecticut state parks. It is managed by the Connecticut Department of Energy and Environmental Protection.

== History ==
The park was once the site of Clarkhurst, the estate of wealthy Higganum harrow manufacturers George, Henry and Thomas Clark. In addition to living at Clarkhurst, the family used the land as a testing ground for agricultural equipment. Henry Clark's daughter, who took possession in 1921, sought to develop the site for recreational use but the property saw steady decline with the coming of the Great Depression. It was owned by Marion Gutherie from 1942 until 1960, when it was purchased by the state for $60,000 using funds provided by the George Dudley Seymour Foundation.

== Activities and amenities ==
Visitors to the park find a small parking area and hiking trails with interpretive signage. Hunting, fishing, and cross-country skiing are also offered.
