= Hurd State Park =

State park in Middlesex County, Connecticut

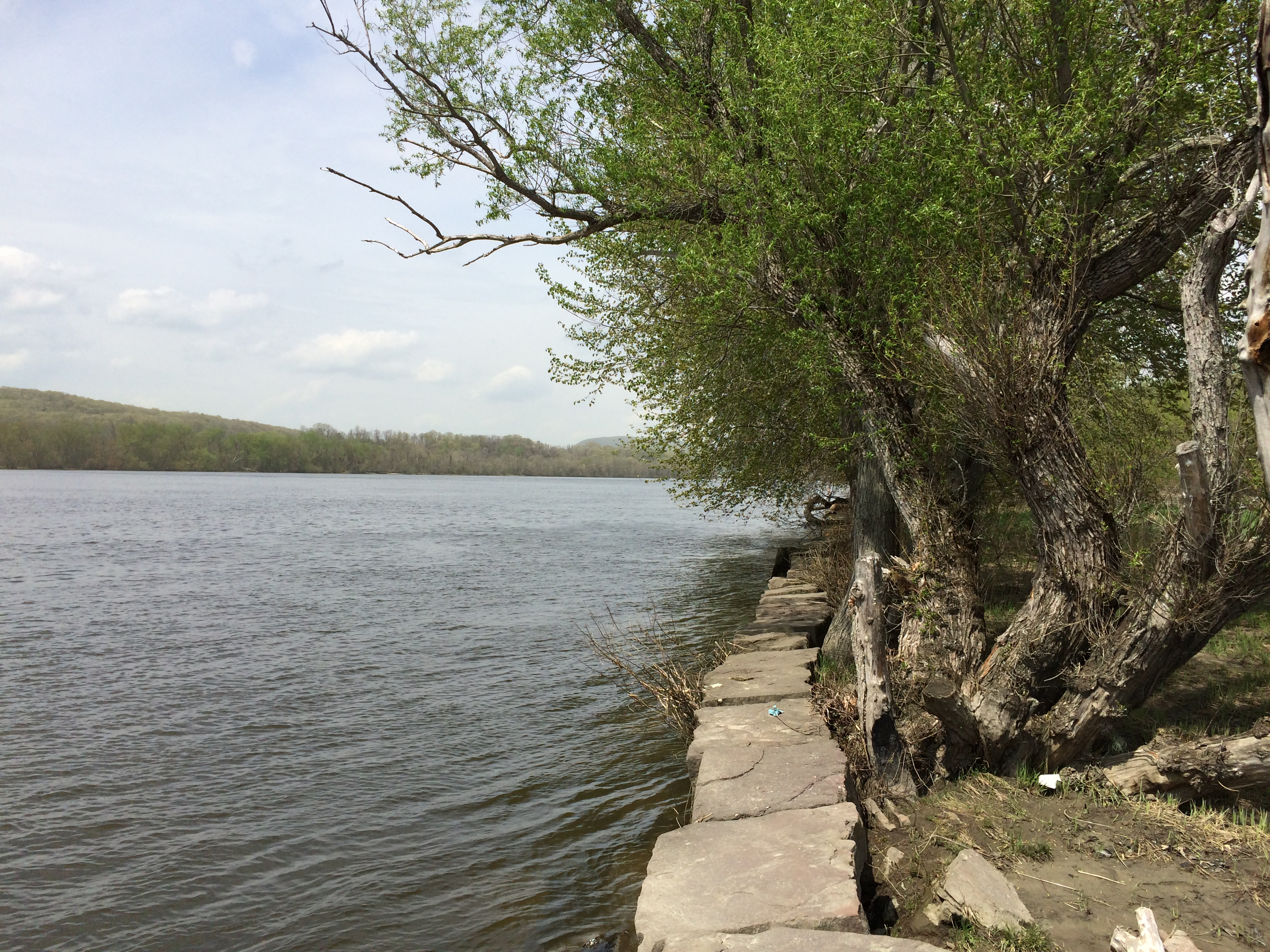
- View of the Connecticut River looking north from Hurd State Park's half-mile-long jetty made of large quarried blocks.

- Location within Connecticut Location within the United States
- Location: East Hampton, Connecticut, United States
- Coordinates: 41°31′19″N 72°32′32″W
- Area: 991 acres (401 ha)
- Elevation: 177 ft (54 m)
- Established: 1914
- Administrator: Connecticut Department of Energy and Environmental Protection
- Designation: Connecticut state park
- Website: Official website

Hurd State Park is a public recreation area lying adjacent to George Dudley Seymour State Park on the east bank of the Connecticut River in the town of East Hampton, Connecticut. In addition to offering hiking, picnicking, and mountain biking, it is one of four Connecticut state parks that offer primitive camping for boaters on the Connecticut River.

== History ==
The park is named for the Hurd family, who came to the region from Massachusetts in 1710. The state purchased the park's first 150 acres in 1914. Shortly after its acquisition, the park became the focus of legal action to determine the ownership of mining privileges when Jesse S. Miller claimed rights to the feldspar on the property; the state ultimately prevailed in the Connecticut State Supreme Court in 1935.
