= Connecticut Landmarks =

US non-profit organization

- Established: 1936
- Location: 59 South Prospect Street, Hartford, CT 06106
- Website: Connecticut Landmarks

Connecticut Landmarks is a non-profit organization that has restored and operates significant historic house museums in Connecticut. Headquartered in Hartford, Connecticut, the organization was founded in 1936 as the Antiquarian & Landmarks Society. The organization is part of the International Coalition of Sites of Conscience.

== Properties ==
- Amasa Day House in Moodus - open by appointment only
- Amos Bull House in Hartford - offices only
- Bellamy-Ferriday House and Garden in Bethlehem
- Butler-McCook House & Garden in Hartford
- Buttolph–Williams House in Wethersfield, Connecticut - operated in partnership with the Webb-Deane-Stevens Museum.
- Joshua Hempsted House in New London
- Nathaniel Hempsted House in New London
- Isham-Terry House in Hartford - open by appointment only
- Forge Farm in Stonington - not currently open to the public
- Nathan Hale Homestead in Coventry (bequeathed by George Dudley Seymour in 1945)
- Phelps-Hatheway House & Garden in Suffield
- Palmer-Warner House in East Haddam

== Image Gallery ==
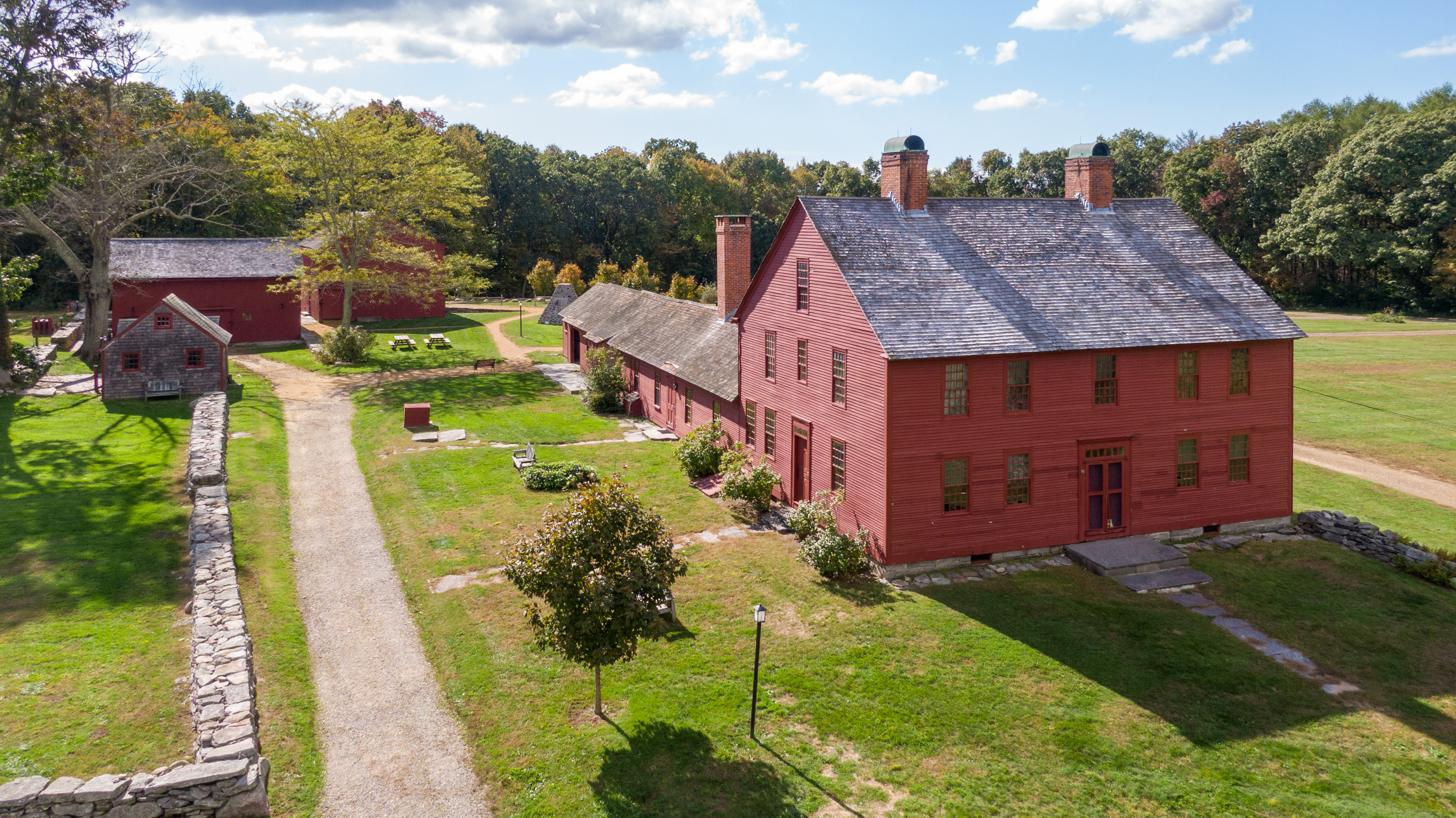
Nathan Hale Homestead in Coventry, CT

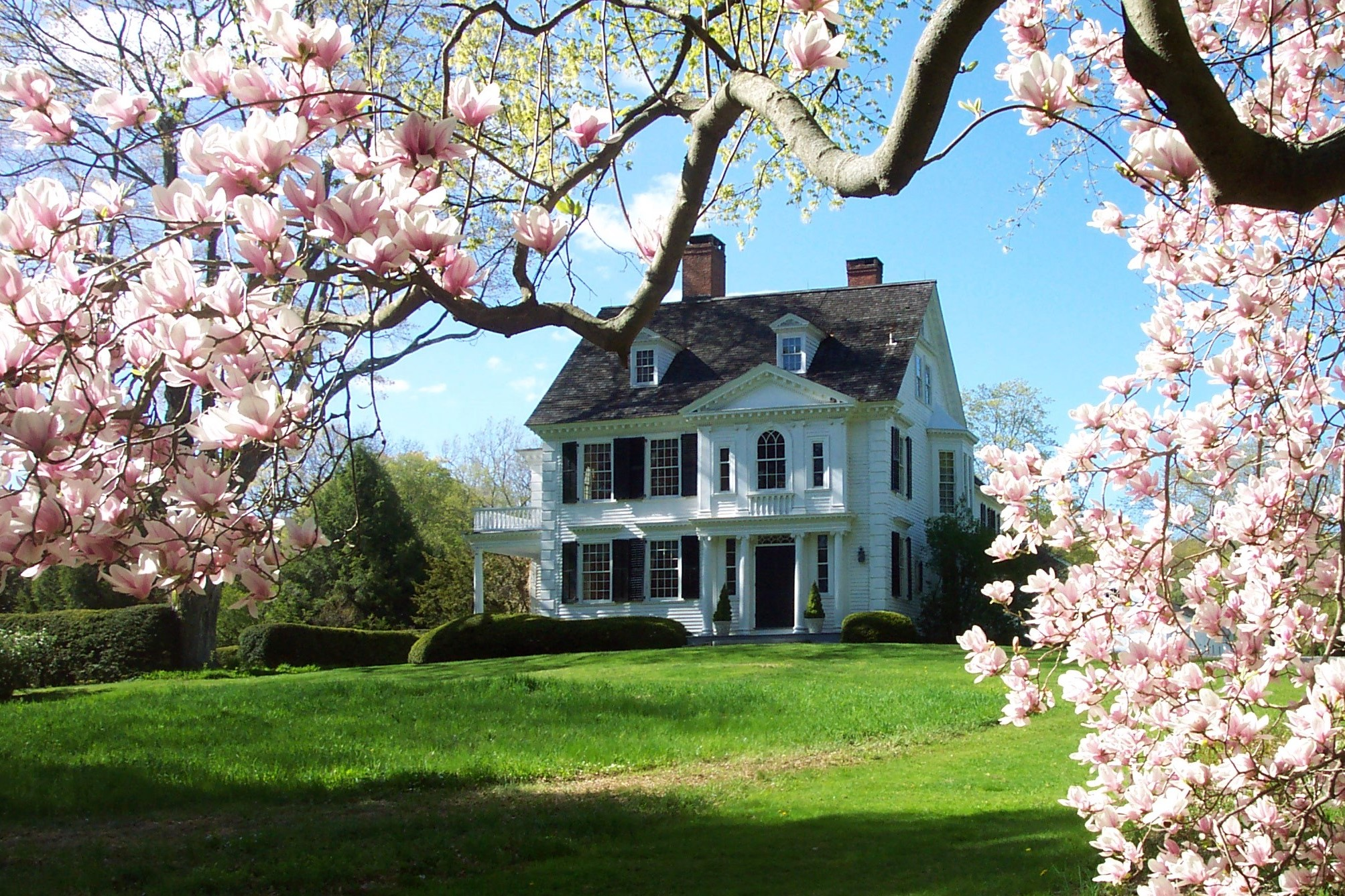
Bellamy-Ferriday House & Garden (Bethlehem, CT)

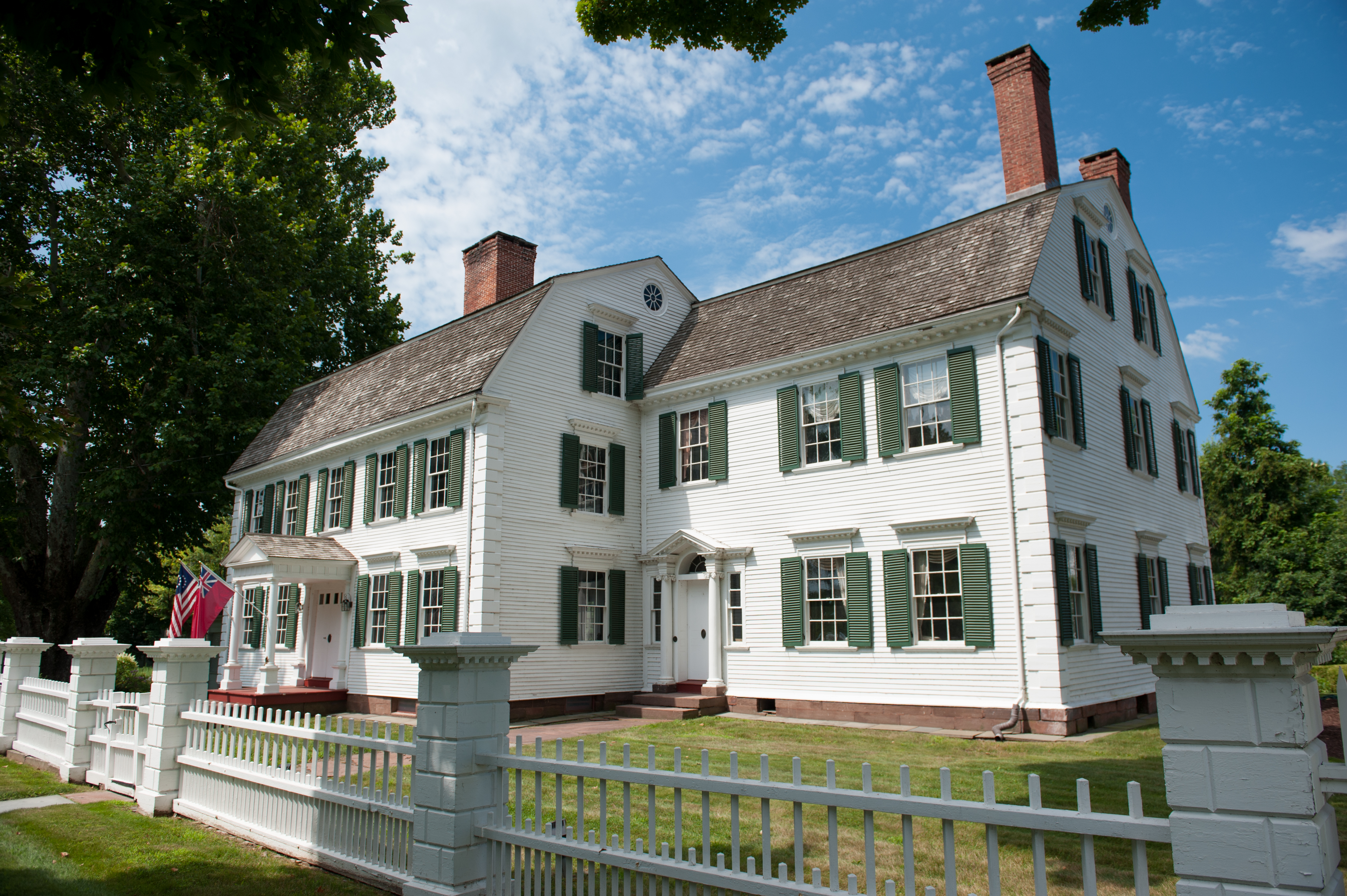
Phelps-Hatheway House & Garden in Suffield, CT

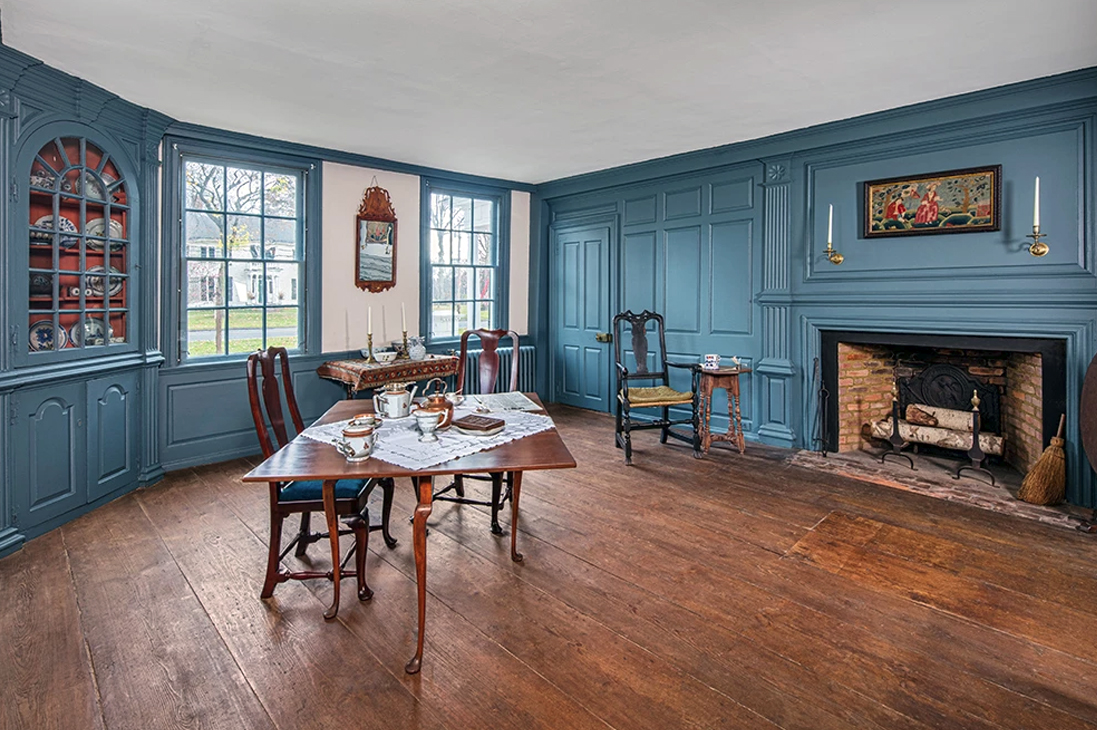
Phelps-Hatheway House Interior

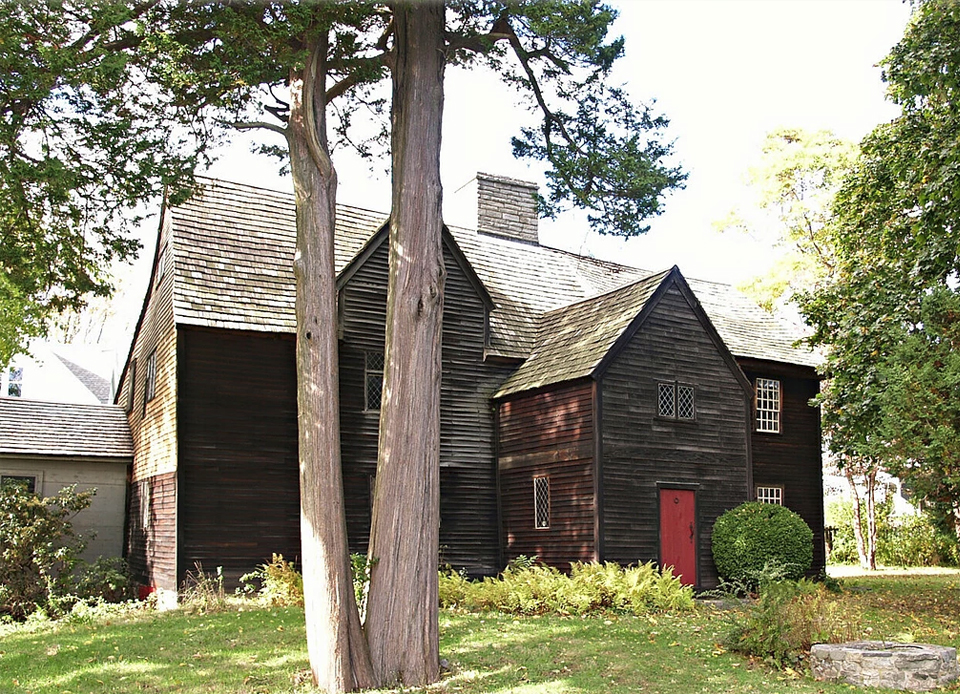
Joshua Hempsted House in New London, CT

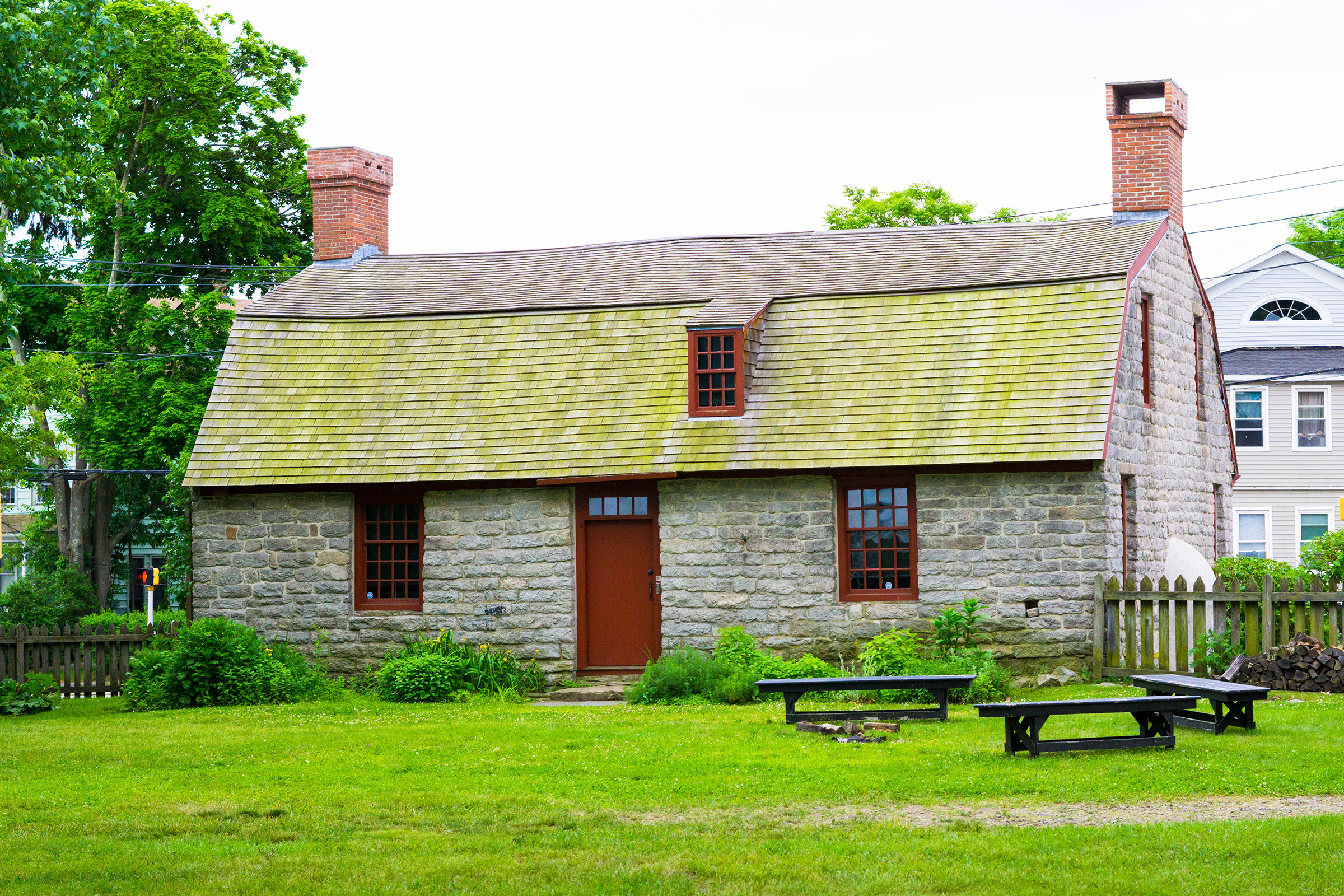
Nathaniel Hempsted House in New London, CT

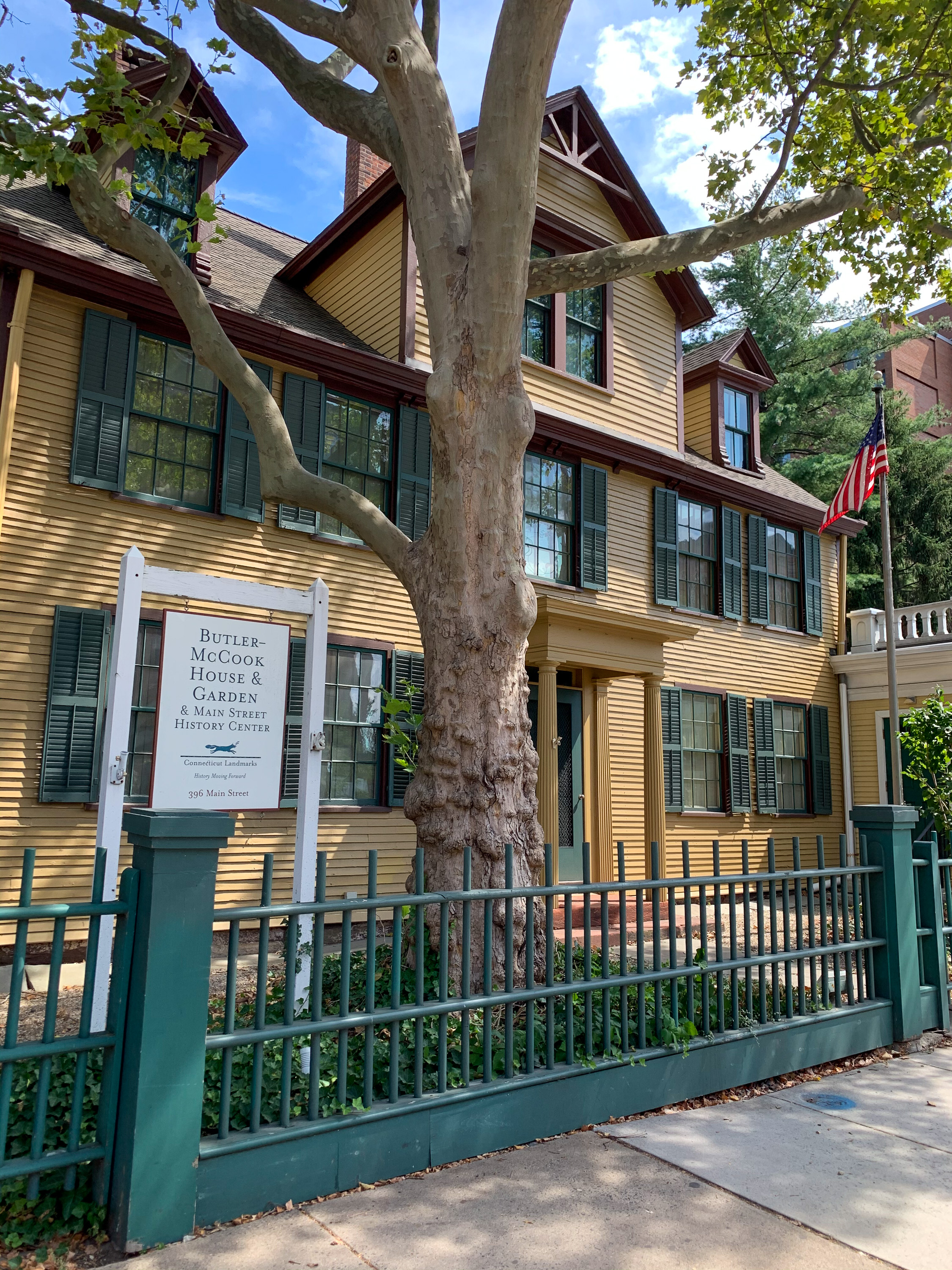
Butler-McCook House in Hartford, CT

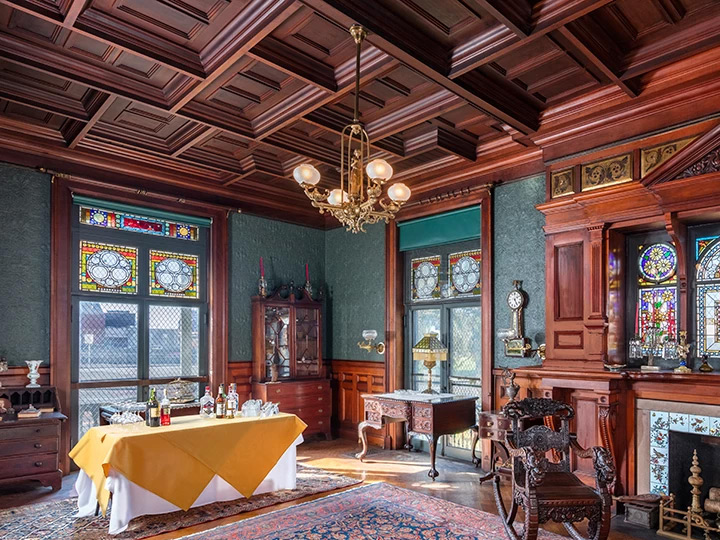
Isham-Terry House in Hartford, CT

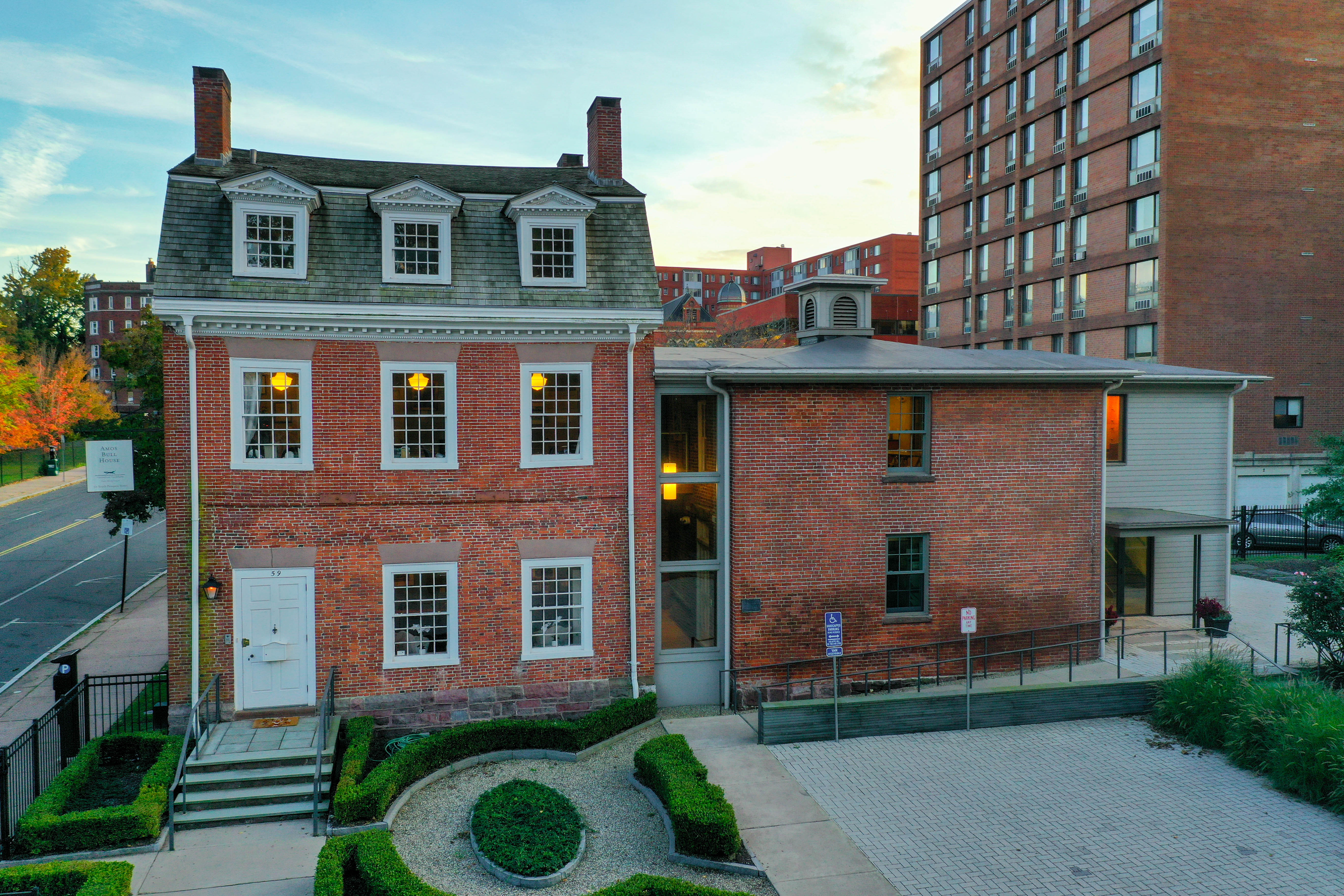
Amos Bull House in Hartford, CT

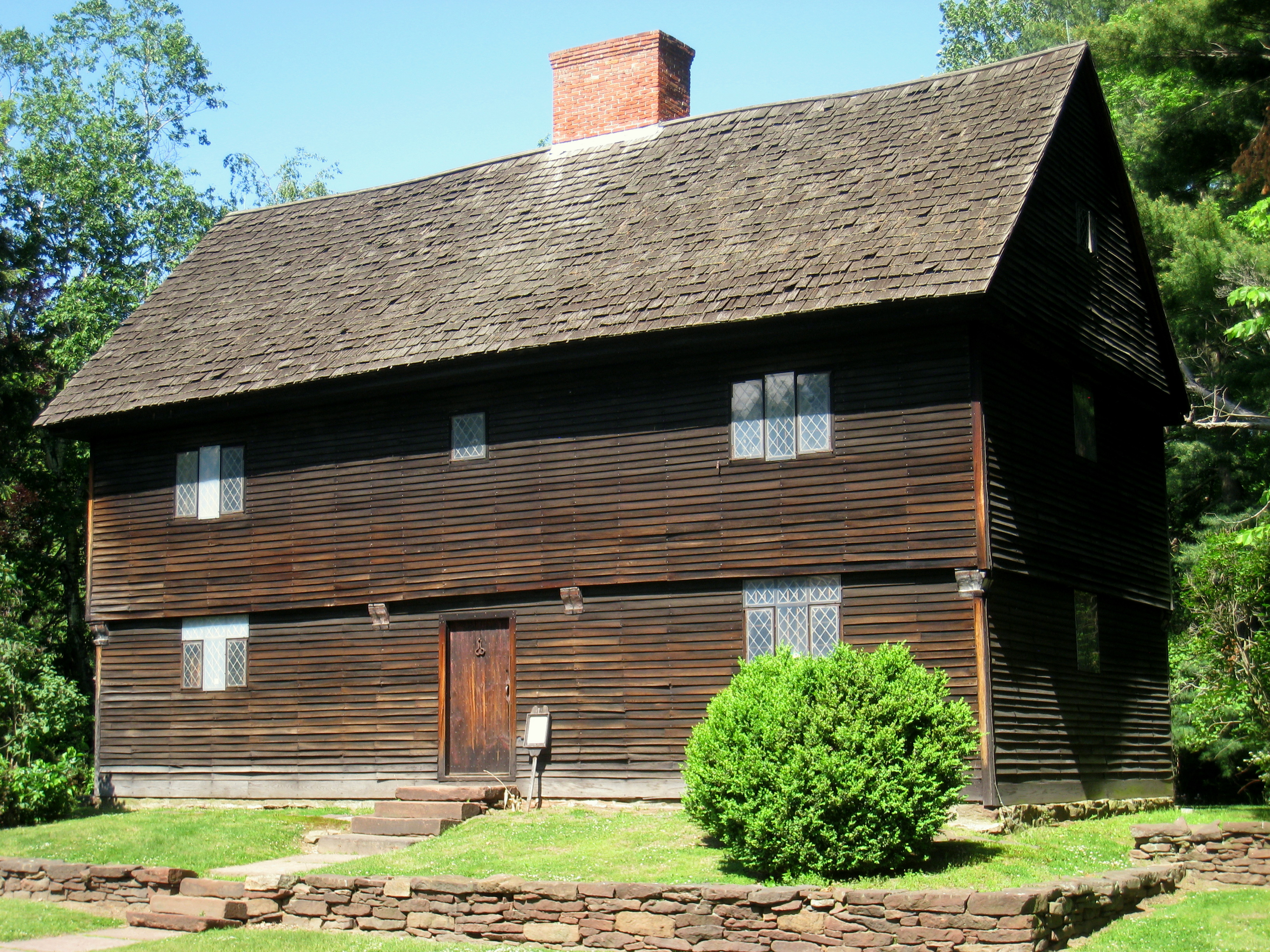
Buttolph–Williams House in Wethersfield, CT

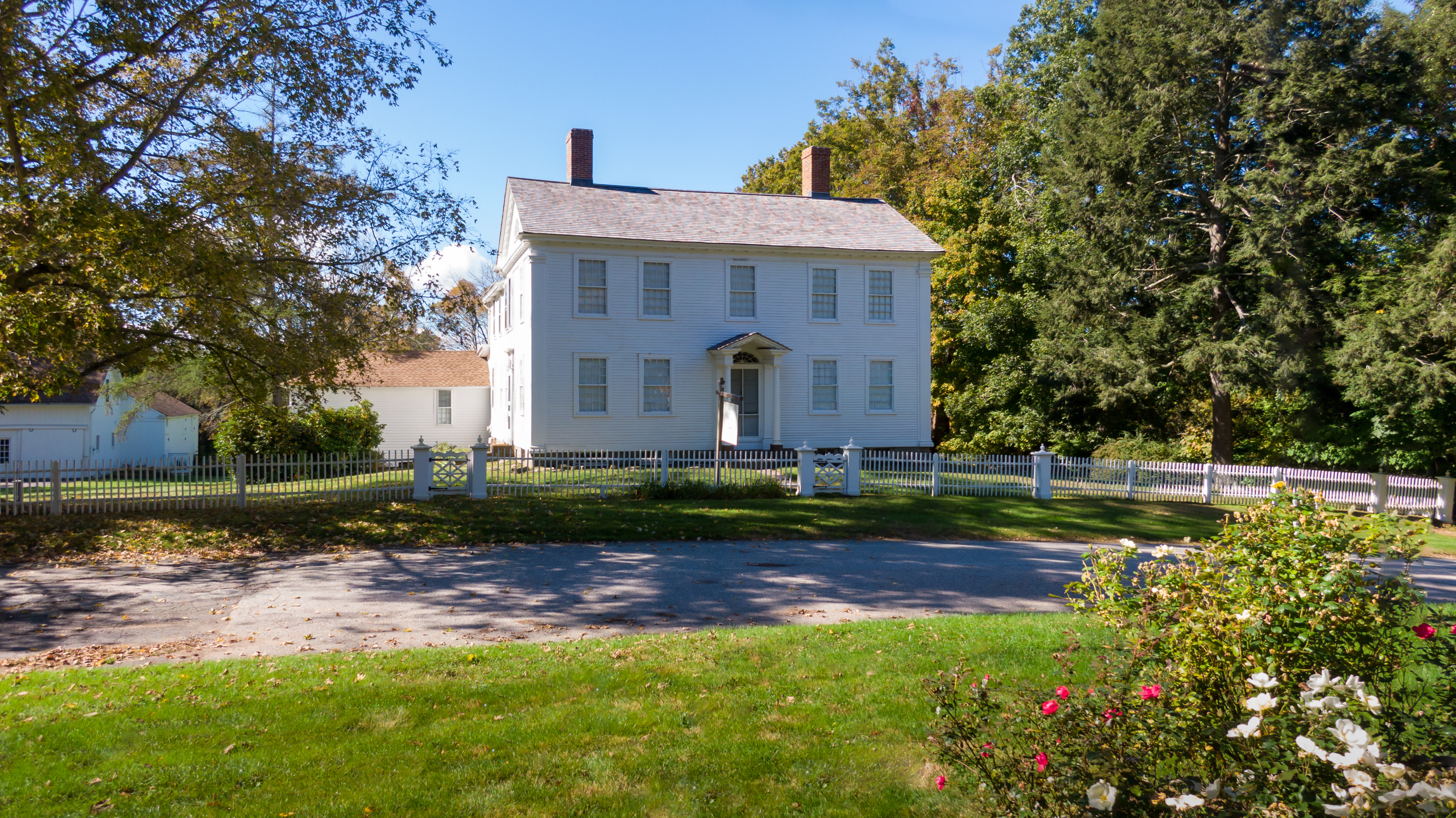
Amasa Day House in East Haddam, CT

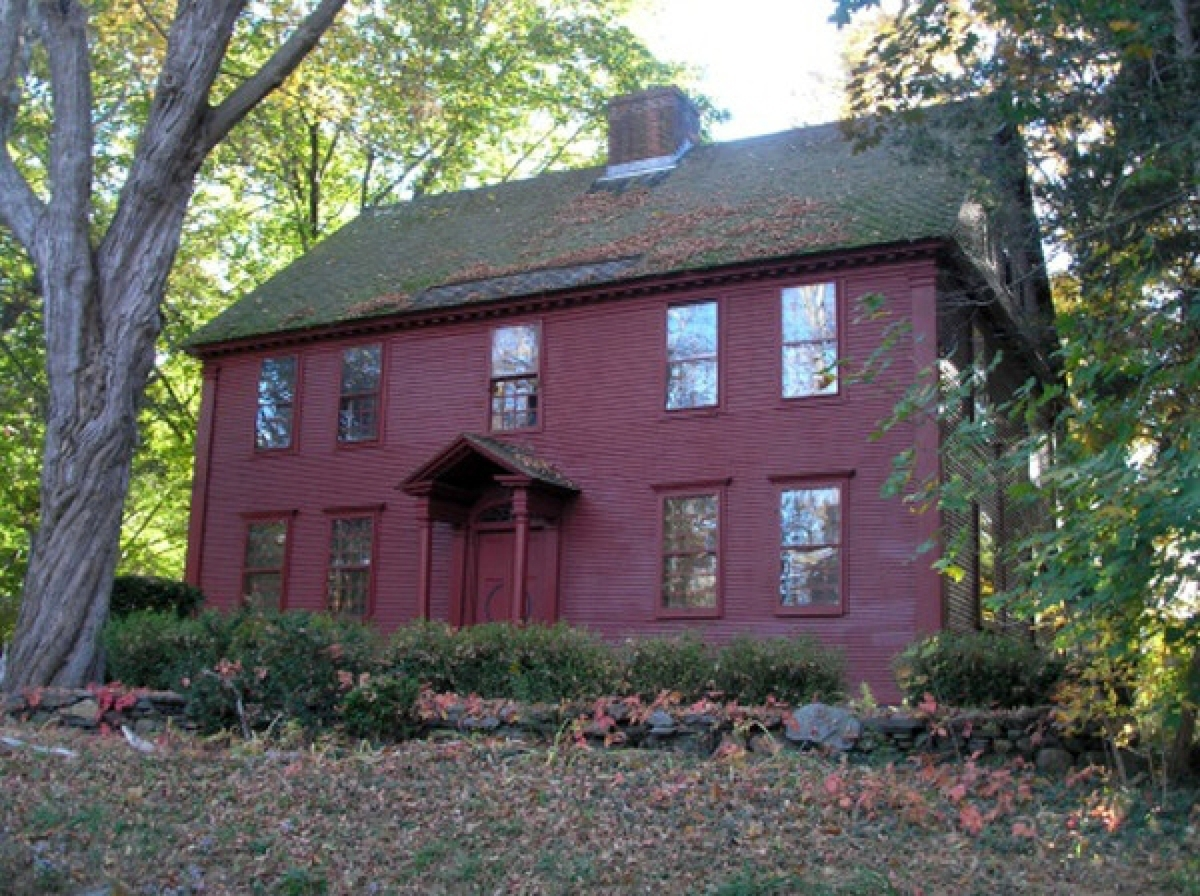
Palmer-Warner House in East Haddam, CT

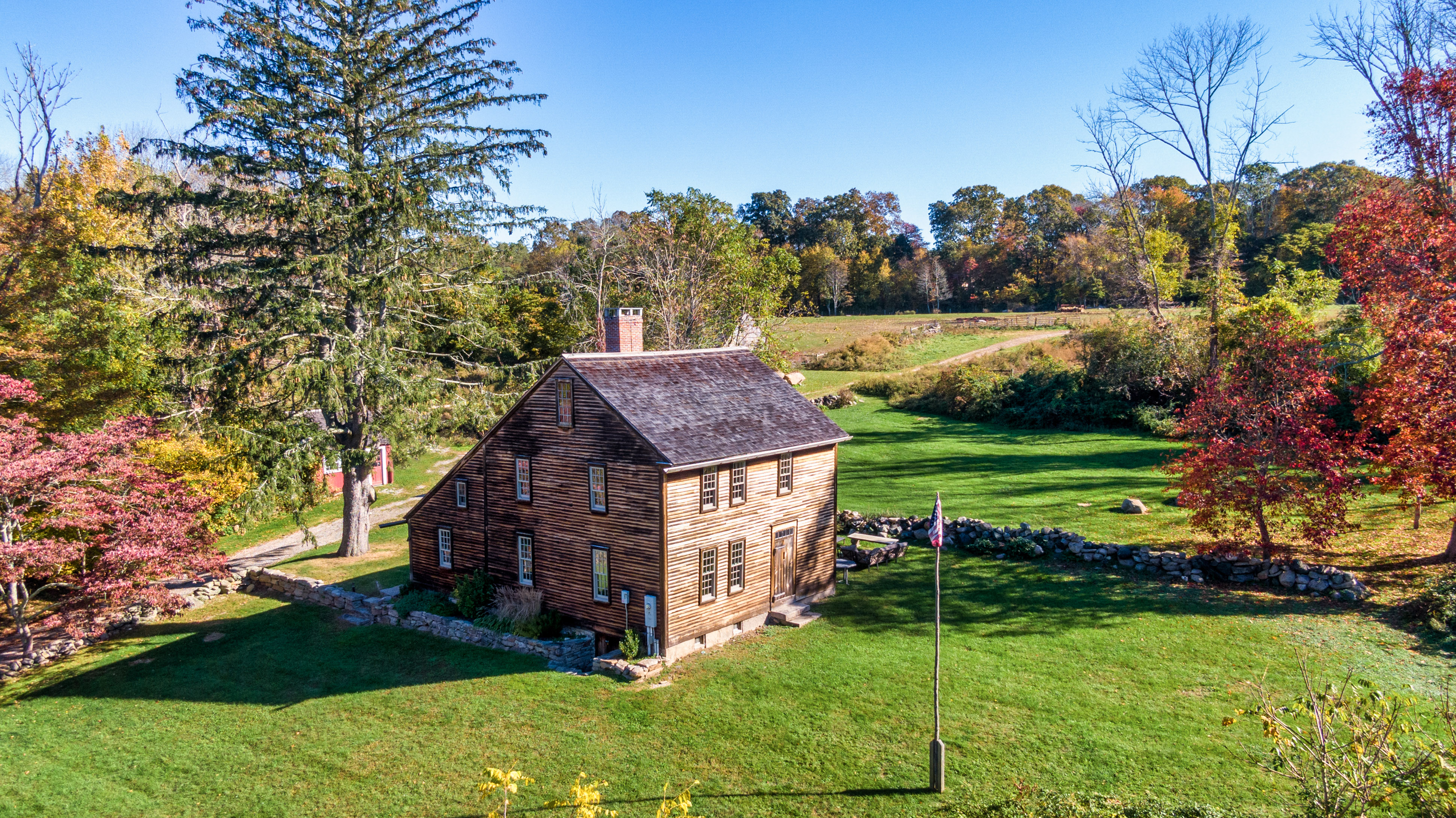
Forge Farm in Stonington, CT

== Formerly Owned Properties ==
The Antiquarian and Landmarks Society, now Connecticut Landmarks, has been bequeathed historic sites that have been sold or transferred to other partners over the 85 years of existence. Some of these sites include:

- Avery Copp House in Groton
- Richard Mansfield House in Ansonia
- Charles Boardman Smith House (Upjohn House) in Hartford

== Investigation & Resolution ==
In February 2018, a series of articles was published by The Day detailing the alleged neglect of historic properties under their care, not following bequest terms, and misuse of funds. As a result, the attorney general's office opened an investigation.

In January 2019, the Connecticut Office of the Attorney General issued a report that "Connecticut Landmarks did not misapproriate any charitable funds in its stewardship of Forge Farm in Stonington and a historic home in East Haddam." Connecticut Landmarks committed to implementing recommended procedural and administrative changes that were recommended. "Our office has completed a comprehensive review of Connecticut Landmarks’ use of charitable funds, consistent with the Attorney General's statutory authority to safeguard charitable assets. Connecticut Landmarks was forthcoming with information, and we have appreciated their cooperation throughout our review. We found no evidence of misappropriation of charitable funds, but have identified areas where we would like to see Connecticut Landmarks better address donor intent and the management and preservation of both its real and personal property.”
