= Warner House (East Haddam, Connecticut) =

United States national historic place

- U.S. National Register of Historic Places
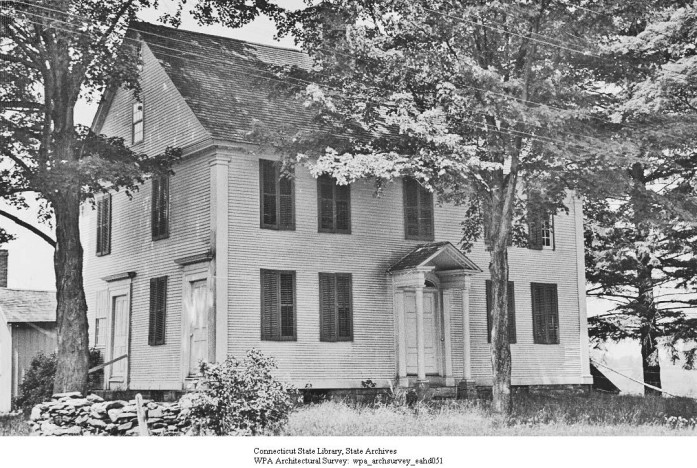
- Photo from the WPA Architectural Survey

- Location within Connecticut Location within the United States
- Location: 307 Town Street, East Haddam, Connecticut
- Coordinates: 41°27′12″N 72°26′27″W
- Area: 50 acres (20 ha)
- Built: c.1738 and c.1790
- NRHP reference No.: 87000174
- Added to NRHP: February 19, 1987

The Warner House is a historic house at 307 Town Street in East Haddam, Connecticut. Built in 1738, it is notable for its high quality interior woodwork and hardware, the latter of which were probably made by some of its owners. The house was listed on the National Register of Historic Places in 1987. The house is now owned by Connecticut Landmarks, and in 2019 it opened as a historic house museum.

== Description and history ==
The Warner House is located in a rural-suburban setting of western East Haddam, on the west side of Town Street (Connecticut Route 82) near its junction with Petticoat Lane. It is a 2 1/2-story wood-frame structure, five bays wide, with a side-gable roof, large central chimney, and clapboarded exterior. The main entrance is at the center of the symmetrical front facade, sheltered by a gabled portico supported by round columns. The entrance is flanked by simple pilasters. The interior follows a typical period center-chimney plan, with high-quality wood paneling around the main parlor fireplace, and elaborate millwork in the second parlor.

The house was built in 1738 by John Warner, and was restyled in 1790, when most of its fine woodwork was added. John Warner was a noted regional maker of interior hardware (hinges, latches, and so on), whose work is probably in this house. His son and grandson, the next occupants of the house, were blacksmiths.

The house was purchased in 1936 by Frederic T. Palmer, a restoration architect, who undertook a careful restoration of the house. In the mid-1940s, Palmer's lover, Howard Metzger, also moved into the house. The couple were not publicly out, but their status as a couple was well-known in their community. They hosted many gatherings of LGBT friends at the home.

Palmer and Metzger also enjoyed collecting antiques, and the house was featured in Antiques Magazine in 1957.

Palmer was a trustee and boardmember of Connecticut Landmarks, who received the property after the death of his partner in 2005.

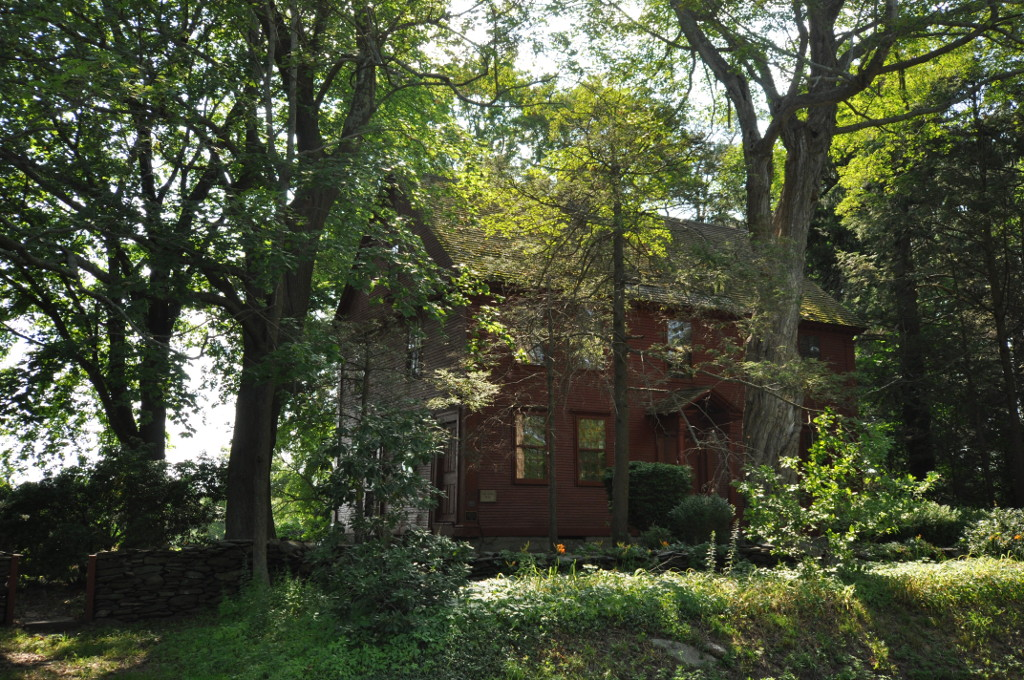
The house in 2016

== See also ==
- National Register of Historic Places listings in Middlesex County, Connecticut
