= Nathan Hale State Forest =

State forest in Connecticut, United States

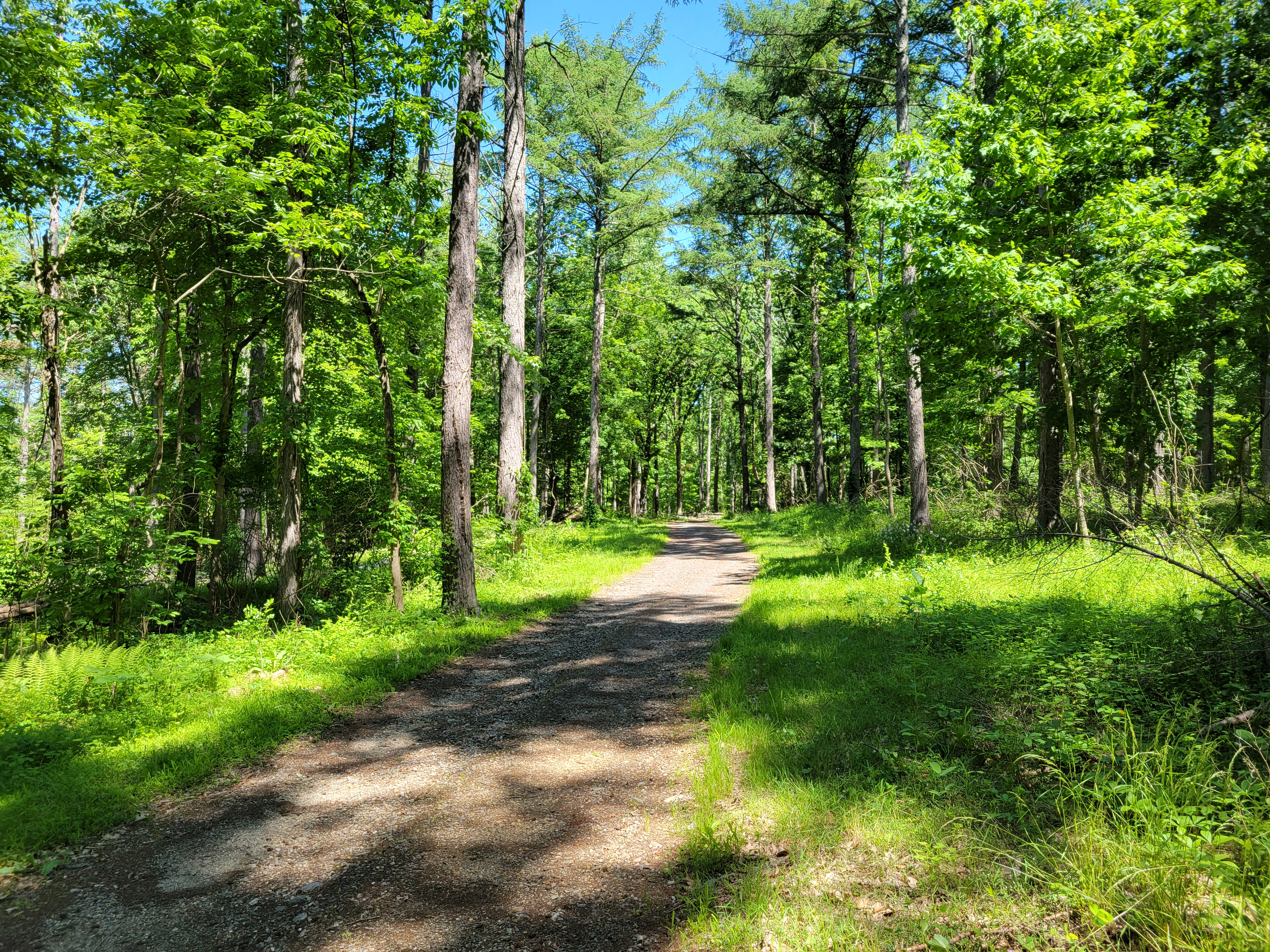

- Location within Connecticut Location within the United States
- Location: Coventry and Andover, Connecticut, United States
- Coordinates: 41°46′00″N 72°20′51″W
- Area: 1,455 acres (589 ha)
- Elevation: 561 ft (171 m)
- Established: 1946
- Administrator: Connecticut Department of Energy and Environmental Protection
- Website: Nathan Hale State Forest

Nathan Hale State Forest is a Connecticut state forest encompassing 1,455 acres (589 ha) in the towns of Coventry and Andover. The forest is managed to sustain a reliable source of forest products and renewable habitat for wildlife.

The forest originated in 1946 through the bequest of George Dudley Seymour, which allowed the state to purchase 850 acres in the surrounds of the historic Nathan Hale Homestead. In addition to cultivated plantations, the forest includes a 200-acre natural area that is kept without management activity.

A 57-acre (23 ha) parcel, Creaser Park, is leased to the Town of Coventry for recreational use. The park offers hiking trails, fishing, and a dog-friendly area. Recreational usage in the rest of the forest includes hiking, hunting and letterboxing.
