= Amos Bull House =

Historic house in Connecticut, United States

- U.S. National Register of Historic Places
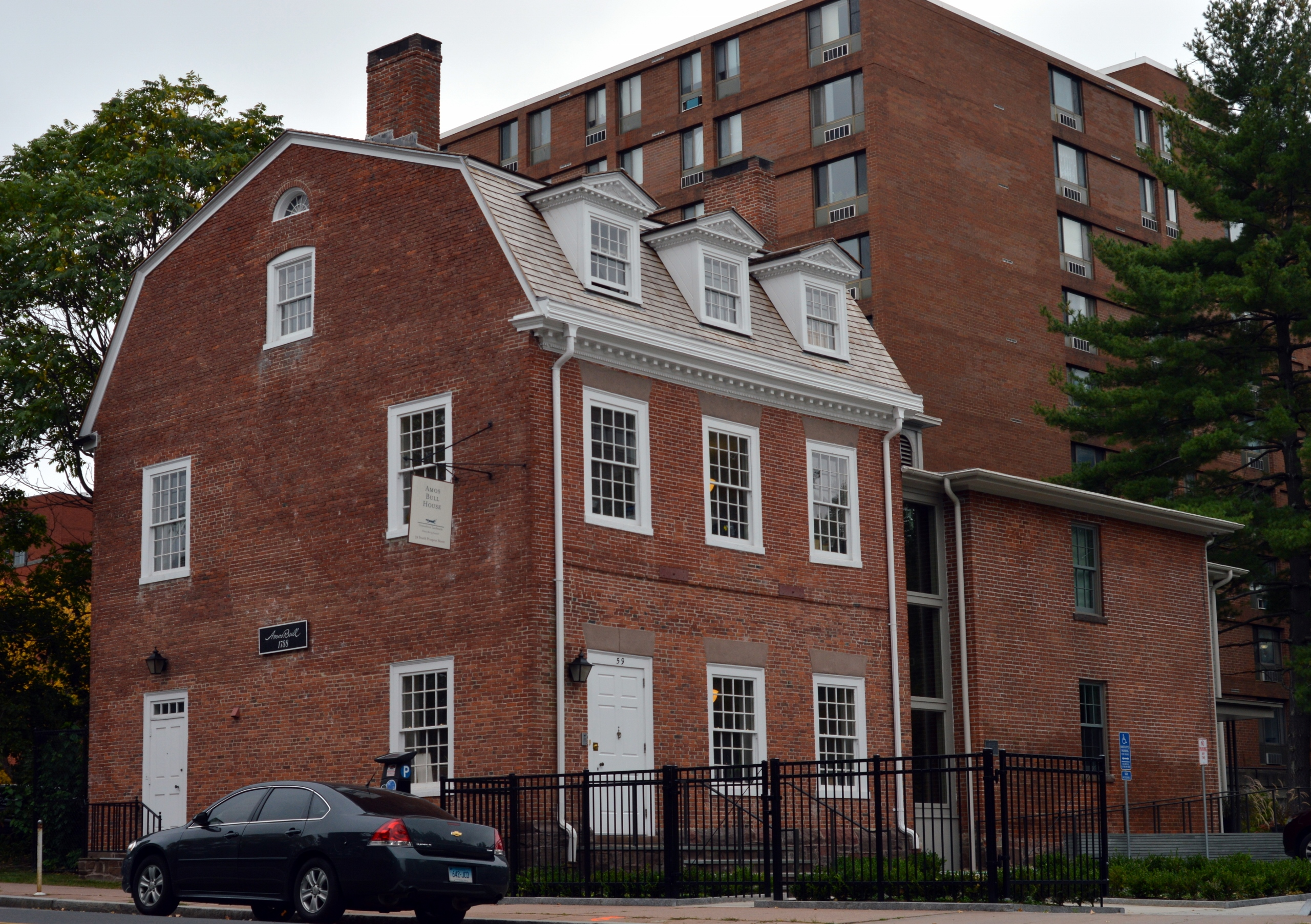

- Location within Connecticut Location within the United States
- Location: 59 South Prospect Street, Hartford, Connecticut
- Coordinates: 41°45′37″N 72°40′25″W
- Area: 0.1 acres (0.040 ha)
- Built: 1788
- Architectural style: Federal
- NRHP reference No.: 68000039
- Added to NRHP: November 8, 1968

The Amos Bull House is a historic house at 59 South Prospect Street in Hartford, Connecticut. Built about 1788, it is one of only a few surviving 18th-century buildings in the city. It was listed on the National Register of Historic Places in 1968. It presently houses the main offices of Connecticut Landmarks, a historic preservation organization.

== Description and history ==
The Amos Bull House stands just south of the Pulaski Mall, south of Downtown Hartford, on the west side of South Prospect Street. This is not the house's original location, which was a short way west on Main Street; it has been moved twice. It is a 2 1/2-story brick building with a gambrel roof. It is three bays wide, with the main entrance in the leftmost bay. Openings on the front facade are rectangular, and topped by splayed brownstone lintels. The front cornice is adorned with dentil moulding, a detail repeated in gabled dormers projecting from the roof. On the exposed side elevation there is a small sash window in a peaked-gable opening in the gable area, with a smaller half-round window above it just below the roof ridge. The interior only retains a few traces of its 18th-century origin.

The house's exact construction date is unknown. It was standing by 1791, when Amos Bull advertised his dry goods business from its address. Since he sold it in 1820, it has housed a variety of commercial enterprises. Originally located facing Main Street, it was moved back from the sidewalk in the early 20th century, and was later moved across the block to its present location.

== See also ==
- National Register of Historic Places listings in Hartford, Connecticut
