= George Dudley Seymour =

American historian and lawyer

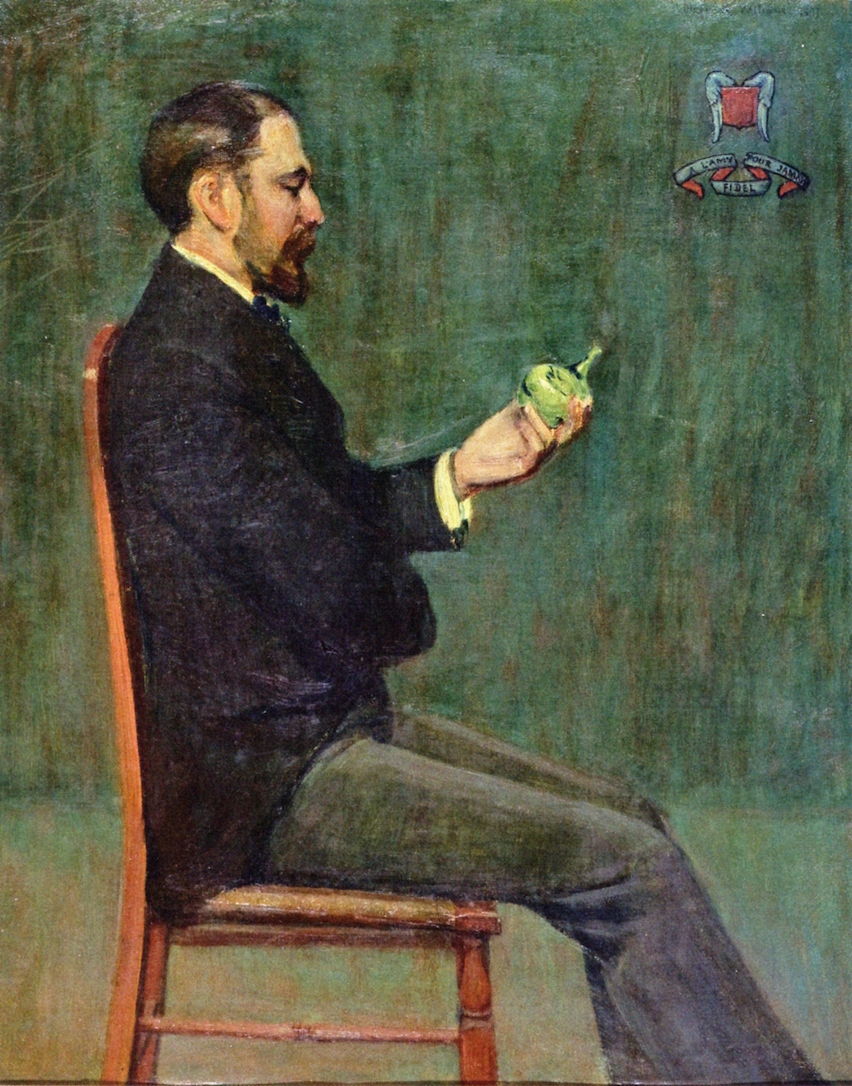
- The Connoisseur by Mary Rogers Williams
- Born: October 6, 1859; Bristol, Connecticut
- Died: January 21, 1945 (aged 85); New Haven, Connecticut
- Resting place: Grove Street Cemetery

George Dudley Seymour (October 6, 1859 – January 21, 1945) was an American historian, patent attorney, antiquarian, author, and city planner. He was the noted authority and foremost expert on Nathan Hale, the American Revolutionary War hero.

== Biography ==
George Dudley Seymour was born in Bristol, Connecticut, the son of Henry Albert Seymour and Electa Churchill. He practiced patent law in Washington, D.C., and then in New Haven, Connecticut. Seymour was a law graduate of Columbian College in Washington, D.C., and received an honorary Master of Arts degree from Yale University in 1913. He was a member of the Walpole Society, the American Antiquarian Society, the Century Association, the Cosmos Club, and the Acorn Club. Seymour was a former vice president of the American Federation of Arts, a trustee of the Wadsworth Atheneum, and chairman of the State Commission of Sculpture. He was a close friend of William Howard Taft, John Singer Sargent, and Gifford Pinchot, and a cousin of Yale President Charles Seymour.

Seymour extensively researched the life of the patriot Nathan Hale. He led the campaign for the statue of Hale on the Old Campus at Yale, and convinced the federal government to print a Nathan Hale postage stamp in 1925. In 1914, Seymour purchased the Nathan Hale Homestead in Coventry, Connecticut, which he restored and gifted to the Antiquarian & Landmarks Society. Upon his death, Seymour gifted to the United States government the life-size bronze statue of Nathan Hale by sculptor Bela Lyon Pratt; the statue is located at the south facade of the United States Department of Justice headquarters in Washington, D.C.

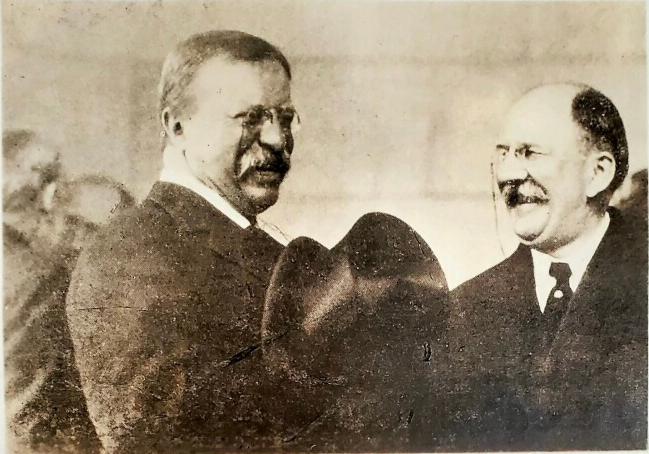
Theodore Roosevelt and George Dudley Seymour in New Haven, April 1915.

Seymour was a leading figure in the municipal development of New Haven, and was the city's most fervent proponent of the City Beautiful movement. The City Beautiful influence in New Haven was responsible for a series of formal public buildings, such as the New Haven County Courthouse and the New Haven Free Public Library, with traditional columns and pediments that reinforced the role of the green as a civic center of classical dignity. In 1908, Seymour persuaded Yale to open the Peabody Museum of Natural History and the Yale University Art Gallery to the public on Sunday afternoons.

He died on January 21, 1945, in New Haven, Connecticut and was buried in the Grove Street Cemetery.

The George Dudley Seymour Papers, Seymour's collection of correspondence, writings, photographs, research files, and printed material, are housed within the Manuscripts and Archives in Sterling Memorial Library at Yale.

A 1925 portrait of Seymour titled The Green Cloak by Cecilia Beaux is on display at the Wadsworth Atheneum in Hartford.

George Dudley Seymour State Park in Middlesex County, Connecticut is named after him.

== See also ==
- Statue of Nathan Hale (Washington, D.C.)
- Nathan Hale Homestead
- Elias Sprague House
- Strong House (Coventry, Connecticut)

== Bibliography ==
- Hale and Wyllys (1933)
- The Seymour Family (1939)
- Documentary Life of Nathan Hale (1942)
- New Haven: A Book Recording the Varied Activities of the Author in his Efforts Over Many Years to Promote the Welfare of the City of his Adoption Since 1883, Together with Some Researches into its Storied Past and Many Illustrations (1942)
