= Amasa Day House =

Historic house in Connecticut, United States

- U.S. National Register of Historic Places
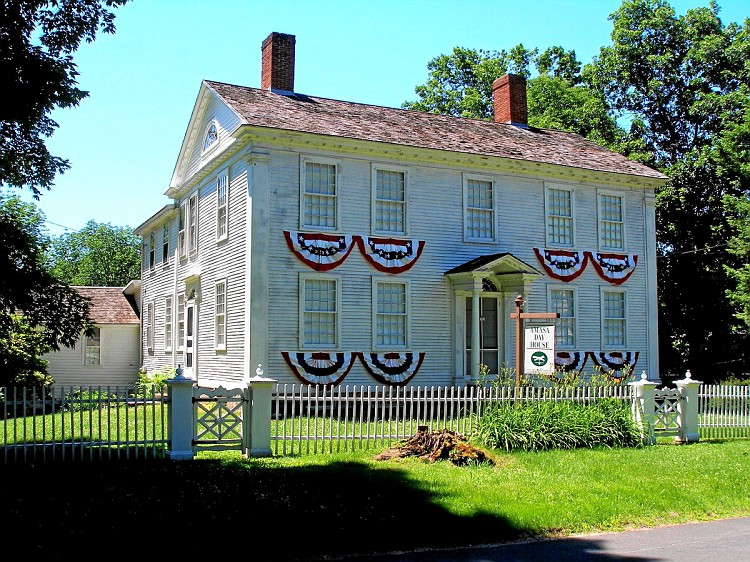

- Location within Connecticut Location within the United States
- Location: 33 Plains Road, Moodus, Connecticut
- Coordinates: 41°30′7″N 72°27′9″W
- Area: 3.5 acres (1.4 ha)
- Built: 1816 and 1878
- Architectural style: Federal
- NRHP reference No.: 72001315
- Added to NRHP: September 22, 1972

The Amasa Day House is a historic house museum at 33 Plains Road in the Moodus village of East Haddam, Connecticut. Built in 1816, it is one of the oldest buildings in the village of Moodus, and a fine example of Federal period architecture. The house, now owned and operated by Connecticut Landmarks, has displays which showcase how the Industrial Revolution changed the daily life of American families. It was listed on the National Register of Historic Places in 1972.

== History ==
The Amasa Day House occupies a prominent location at the northwest end of the Moodus village green, on 3.5 acres (1.4 ha) of land that are mostly screened from the nearby state highway by trees. It is a 2 1/2-story wood-frame structure, with a gabled roof and clapboarded exterior. Corner pilasters rise to a shallow entablature, with modillion blocks in the eaves. The side gable ends are pedimented, with half-round windows at the center. The main entrance is sheltered by a gabled portico; it is flanked by pilasters and topped by a half-oval transom window. Late 19th-century ells extend to the rear of the original main block.

The house was constructed in 1816 for farmer Colonel Julius Chapman, his wife Frances, and their four daughters. After his death, Amasa Day purchased the property, but later sold off parcels of land as he focused more on his roles as an insurance agent and banker. The house was subsequently inherited by Day's daughter and son-in-law Katherine and Eugene Chaffee, who worked for the New York Net and Twine Company, one of several twine factories in Moodus. Their son was Dr. Amasa Day Chaffee, a well-known art photographer.

== Museum ==
The house was donated to Connecticut Landmarks in 1967; and is currently available for tours seasonally, by appointment. An investigation by the attorney general's office into their alleged neglect of the property concluded in 2019 and found no evidence of wrongdoing. However, it did provide recommendations to improve future accountability.

== See also ==
- National Register of Historic Places listings in Middlesex County, Connecticut
