= Isham-Terry House =

Historic house in Connecticut, United States

- U.S. National Register of Historic Places
- U.S. Historic district – Contributing property
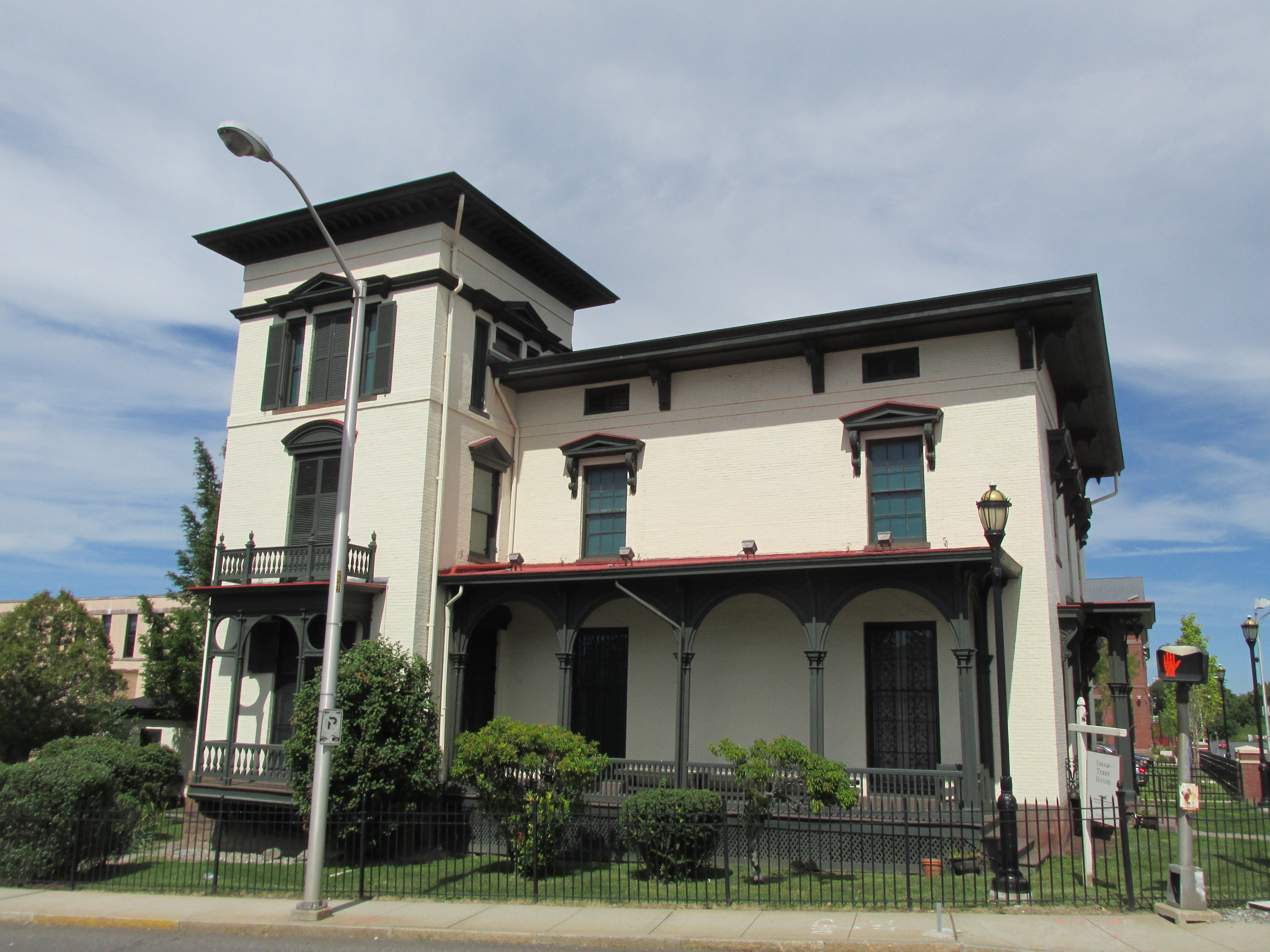

- Location within Connecticut Location within the United States
- Location: 211 High Street, Hartford, Connecticut
- Coordinates: 41°46′17″N 72°40′45″W
- Area: less than one acre
- Built: 1854
- Architectural style: Italianate
- Part of: Downtown North Historic District (ID04000390)
- NRHP reference No.: 82004413

Significant dates
- Added to NRHP: February 11, 1982
- Designated CP: May 6, 2004

The Isham-Terry House is a historic house museum at 211 High Street in Hartford, Connecticut. Built around 1854, from 1896 it was home to members of the Isham family, who restored it in the early 20th century. The family donated the property to Connecticut Landmarks in the 1970s, which now operates it has a museum, offering guided tours and facility event rentals. The house was listed on the National Register of Historic Places in 1982.

== Description and history ==
The Isham-Terry House occupies a prominent and highly visible location just north of Interstate 84 outside downtown Hartford, at the northwest corner of High and Walnut Streets, and adjacent to the city's police department headquarters. It is a roughly cubical painted brick structure, two stories in height, with a low-pitch roof. A three-story tower projecting from its southwest corner adds visual prominence. The roof eaves are deep, with decorative Italianate brackets for support. Windows are on the two main floors are set in rectangular openings, with narrow oblong windows in the attic level of the main block. On the street-facing facades, the second-floor windows are topped by gabled or segmented-arch pediments with brackets on either side. The first floor of the facade facing Walnut Street is sheltered by a porch supported by slender clustered columns, with round-arch openings that have carved woodwork in the spandrels, and a low spindled balustrade. A similar porch shelters the main entrance facing High Street, and balconies on the tower share similar features. The building interior is well preserved, with lincrusta wall covering, ornate woodwork, and glass chandeliers.

The house was built sometime between the 1852 purchase of land by Ebenezer Roberts, and his listing as the building's first occupant in 1856. Roberts was a directory of the Hartford National Bank, Travelers Insurance Company, and other local businesses. Construction of this house contributed to the development of Asylum Hill as a desirable and fashionable neighborhood for the city's elites, although urban renewal has resulted in demolition of nearly all of the other similar houses that once lined High Street. The house was purchased in 1896 by Dr. Oliver Isham, a descendant of the locally prominent Isham and Terry families. He lived here and operated a medical practice. In the 1970s his surviving descendants gave the property to Connecticut Landmarks for preservation.

== See also ==
- National Register of Historic Places listings in Hartford, Connecticut
