= Hatheway House =

Historic house in Connecticut, United States

- U.S. National Register of Historic Places
- U.S. Historic district – Contributing property
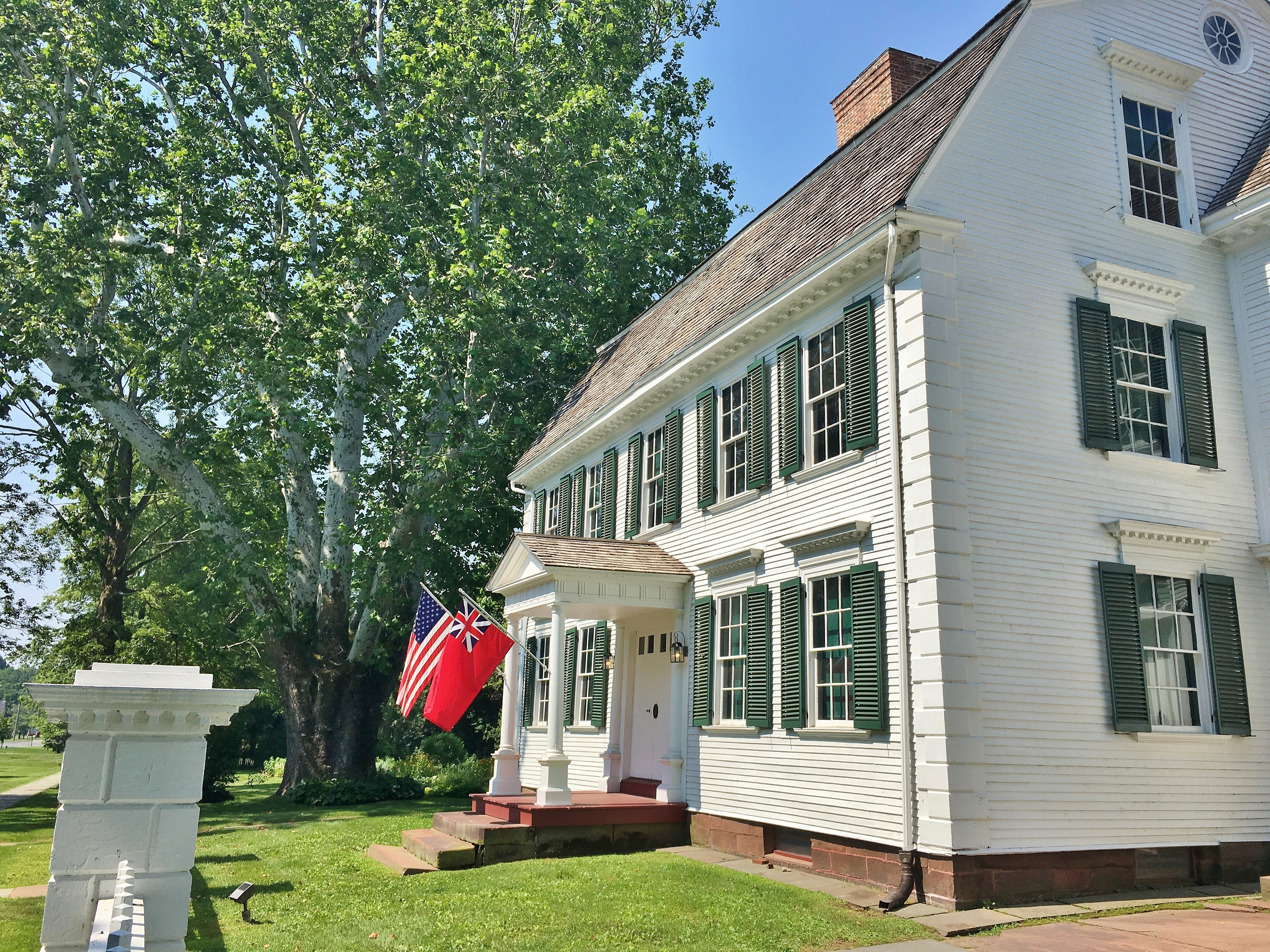

- Location within Connecticut Location within the United States
- Location: 55 South Main Street, Suffield, Connecticut
- Coordinates: 41°58′48″N 72°39′10″W
- Area: less than one acre
- Built: 1762
- Architect: Benjamin, Asher
- Architectural style: Georgian
- Part of: Suffield Historic District (ID79003750)
- NRHP reference No.: 75001934

Significant dates
- Added to NRHP: August 6, 1975
- Designated CP: September 25, 1979

The Hatheway House, also known as the Phelps-Hatheway House & Garden, is a historic house museum at 55 South Main Street in Suffield, Connecticut. The sprawling house has sections built as early as 1732, with significant alterations made in 1795 to a design by Asher Benjamin for Oliver Phelps, a major land speculator. The house provides a window into a wide variety of 18th-century home construction methods. It is now maintained by Connecticut Landmarks, and is open seasonally between May and October. It was listed on the National Register of Historic Places in 1975.

== Description and history ==
The Hatheway House is located in the village center of Suffield, on the west side of South Main Street, south of its junction with Bridge Street. It is a sprawling multi-section wood-frame structure, with a 2 1/2-story five-bay central block flanked on the north by a 2 1/2-story three-bay section and on the left by a 1 1/2-story ell. Each section is covered by gambrel roof and is sheathed in wooden clapboards. The center block, built in 1762, has a large central chimney, and its interior is finished with high-quality Georgian woodwork. The southern ell is an older structure with simple finishes, and may date as far back as 1732. The northern addition was added in 1795. The main entrance is at the center of the main block, sheltered by a Doric portico designed by Asher Benjamin and added in 1795. Outbuildings on the property include a carriage house and barn, both 19th-century structures.

The main block of the house was built about 1762, probably by Abraham Burbank, and was originally more plainly decorated with a gable roof. Burbank's son Shem sold the house to Oliver Phelps in 1788. Phelps, then already a man of some wealth and sophistication, transformed the house into the mansion it is now. Phelps was a principal in the Phelps and Gorham Purchase of six million acres of land in upstate New York, making him one of the nation's largest landowners. Phelps lived here until 1802, when he moved to Canandaigua, New York, to more closely oversee the development and sale of his holdings.

== See also ==
- National Register of Historic Places listings in Hartford County, Connecticut
