= Jericho Trail =

Hiking trail in Connecticut, US

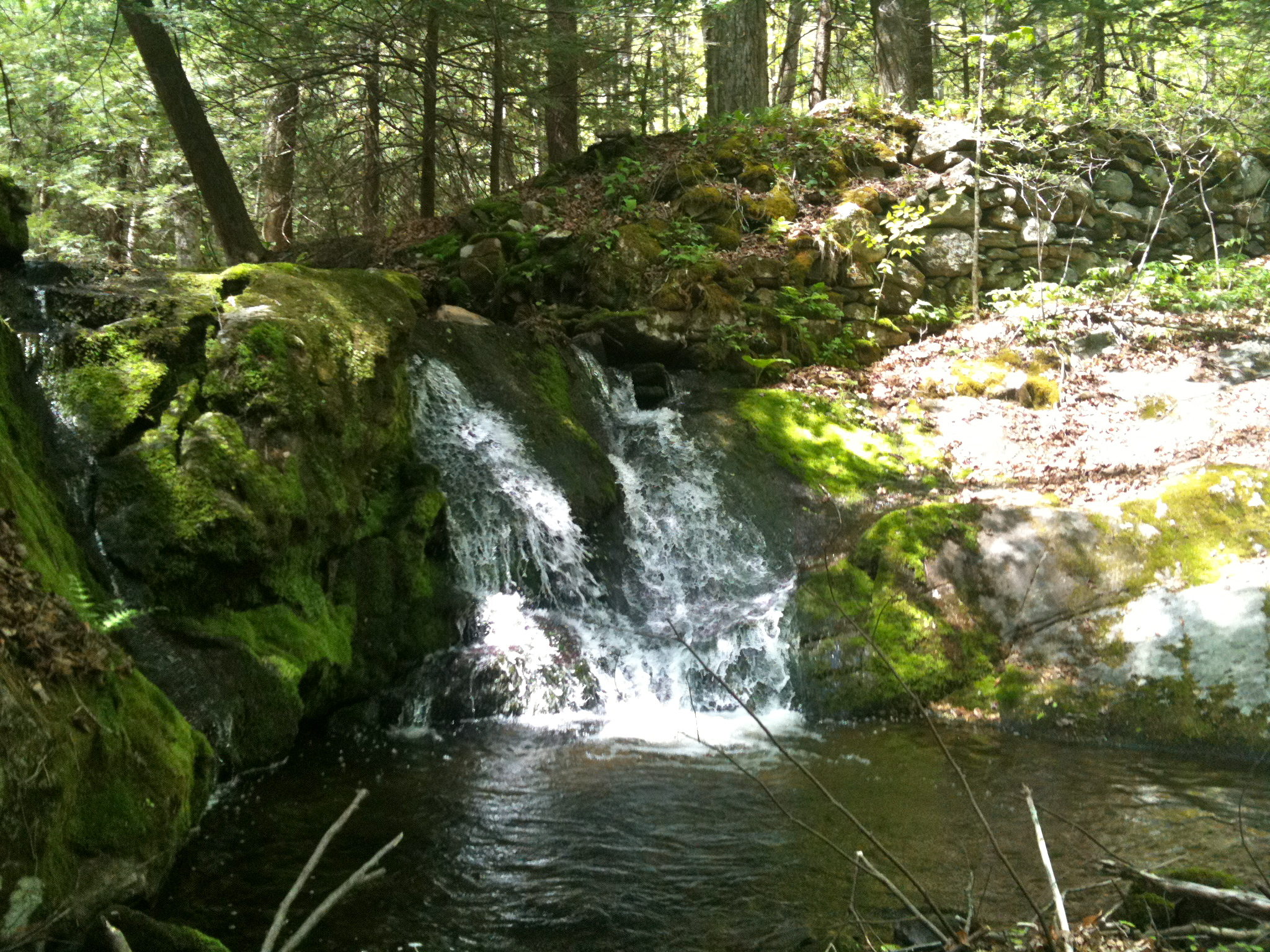
- Jericho Brook water falls over ancient broken dam into pool below.
- Length: 3.4 miles (5.5 km)
- Location: Mattatuck State Forest, Watertown (near Thomaston and Plymouth), Litchfield County, Connecticut
- Designation: CFPA Blue-Blazed Trail
- Use: hiking, cross-country skiing, snowshoeing, fishing, rock climbing, geocaching
- Highest point: Crane's Lookout, 810 ft (250 m)
- Difficulty: Easy to moderate difficulty, some rock scrambling.
- Sights: Naugatuck River Valley, White stone cliffs, Rock House, Crane's Lookout.
- Hazards: hunters, deer ticks, poison ivy

The Jericho trail is a 3.4-mile (5.5 km) Blue-Blazed hiking trail in Watertown, near the border with Thomaston and Plymouth, Litchfield County, Connecticut. The trail is contained almost entirely in a section of the Mattatuck State Forest. The mainline trail is a linear north–south "hike-through" trail.

The trail is listed as one of the three short Waterbury Area Trails in the Connecticut Walk Book West.

The Jericho trail is a linear trail with a trailhead and parking area at the trails southern terminus on Echo Lake Road and a connector trail leading to Connecticut Route 262 in the west. The northern terminus terminates at the trail's intersection with the Mattatuck Trail near the Rock House and Crane's Lookout. Notable features several scenic overlook views including an 810-foot summit with a 270 degree panorama (Crane's Lookout 41.6293°N 73.0565°W). The trail stops just before Crane's Lookout and the Rock House underneath, both which are on the Mattatuck Trail. The trail is maintained largely through the efforts of the Connecticut Forest and Park Association.

== Trail description ==
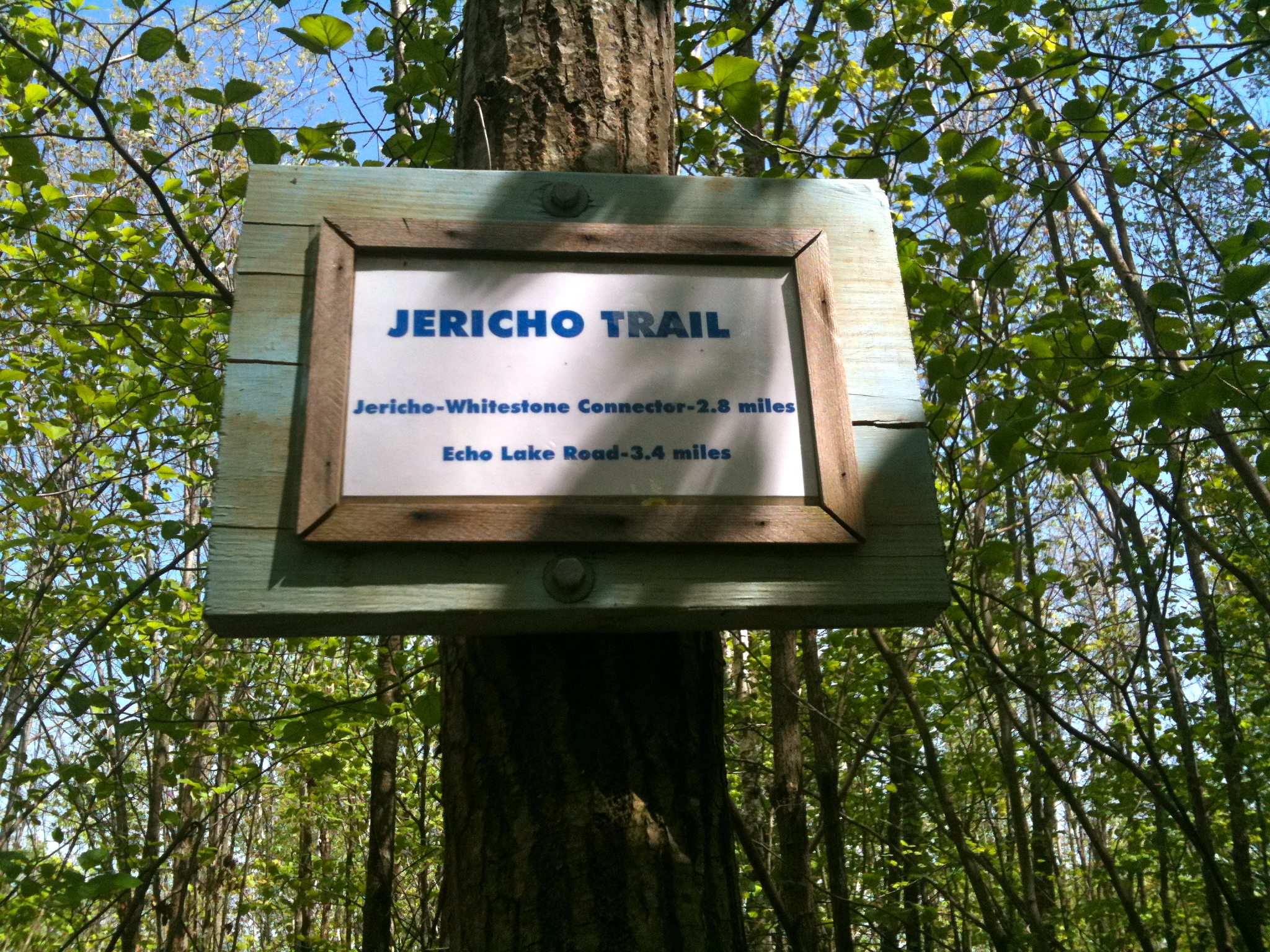
Jericho Trail head sign at junction with Mattatuck Trail.

The Jericho Trail is primarily used for hiking, backpacking, rock climbing, and in the winter, snowshoeing.

=== Trail route ===
From the north it is also possible to connect to the Jericho Trail via the Mattatuck Trail (which can be found in Black Rock State Park), or to hike in using either of two unmarked paths (which include dirt road portions), one off of Park Road the other on.

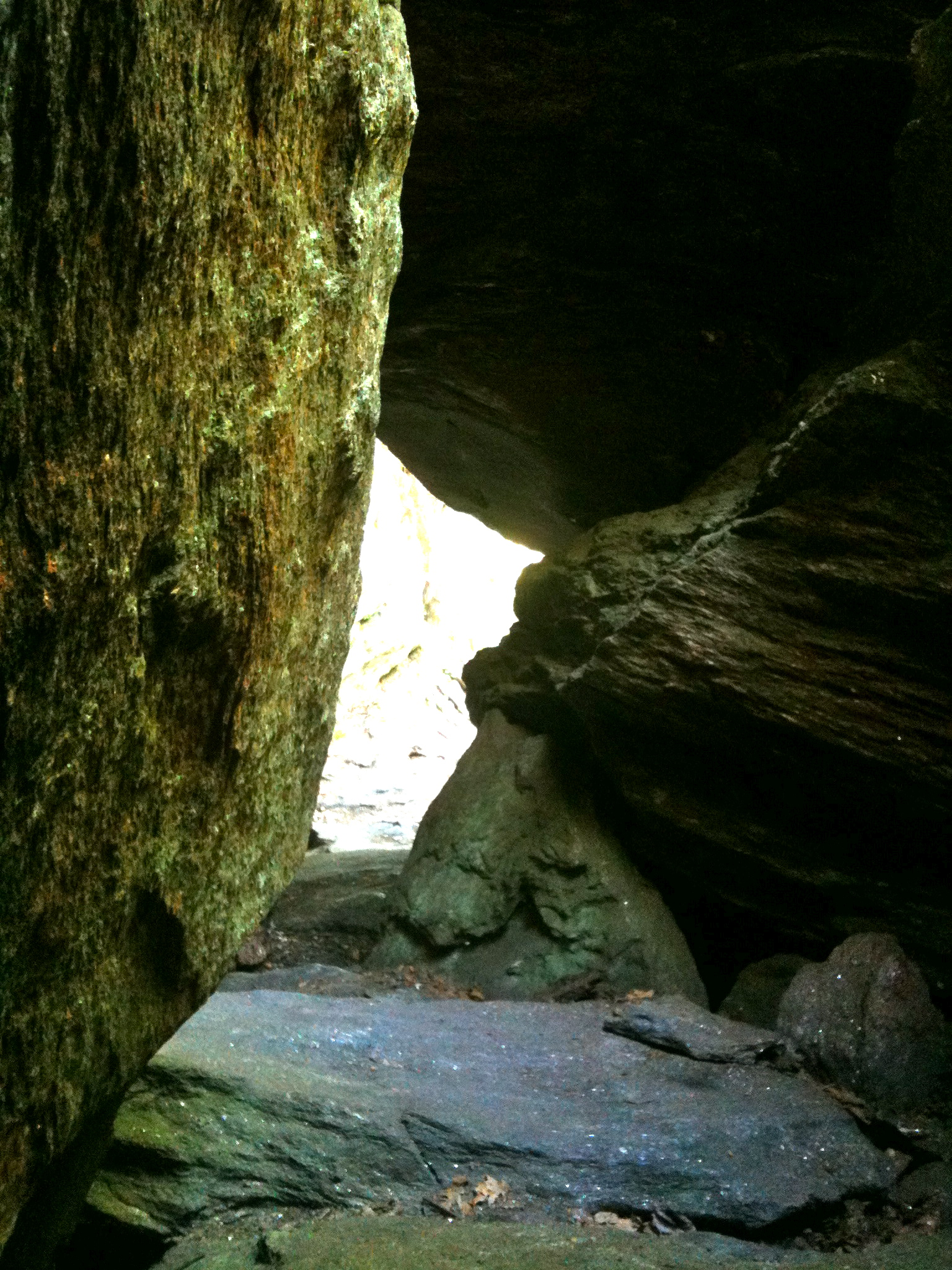
Inside the main room of the famous Rock House at the intersection of the Jericho and Mattatuck trails.

=== Origin and name ===
The trail is named for Jericho Brook which the trail follows for a length of less than a mile in the upper northern half of the trail route.

=== Folklore ===
The Leatherman was a nineteenth-century vagabond who traveled approximately ten miles a day in a thirty-four (34) day circular route between New York's Hudson River in the west and the Connecticut River in the east. His circuit was also bounded by Long Island Sound in the South and the Litchfield Hills in the north.

He was found dead in March 1889 near Ossining, New York, in his Saw Mill Woods rock shelter (apparently of mouth cancer due to his use of tobacco) and is buried at the Sparta Cemetery, Route 9, Scarborough, New York.

== Hiking ==
The mainline trail is blazed with blue rectangles. Trail descriptions are available from a number of commercial and non-commercial sources, and a complete guidebook is published by the Connecticut Forest and Park Association in the Connecticut Walk Book west. A map of the Thomaston and Watertown sections of the trail is available from the Connecticut Department of Energy and Environmental Protection at its website.

Weather along the route is typical of Connecticut. Conditions on exposed ridge tops and summits may be harsher during cold or stormy weather.

== See also ==
- Blue-Blazed Trails
- Leatherman (vagabond)
- Mattatuck State Forest
- Naugatuck Railroad
- Naugatuck River
- Watertown
