= Mattatuck State Forest =

Protected area in Connecticut, US

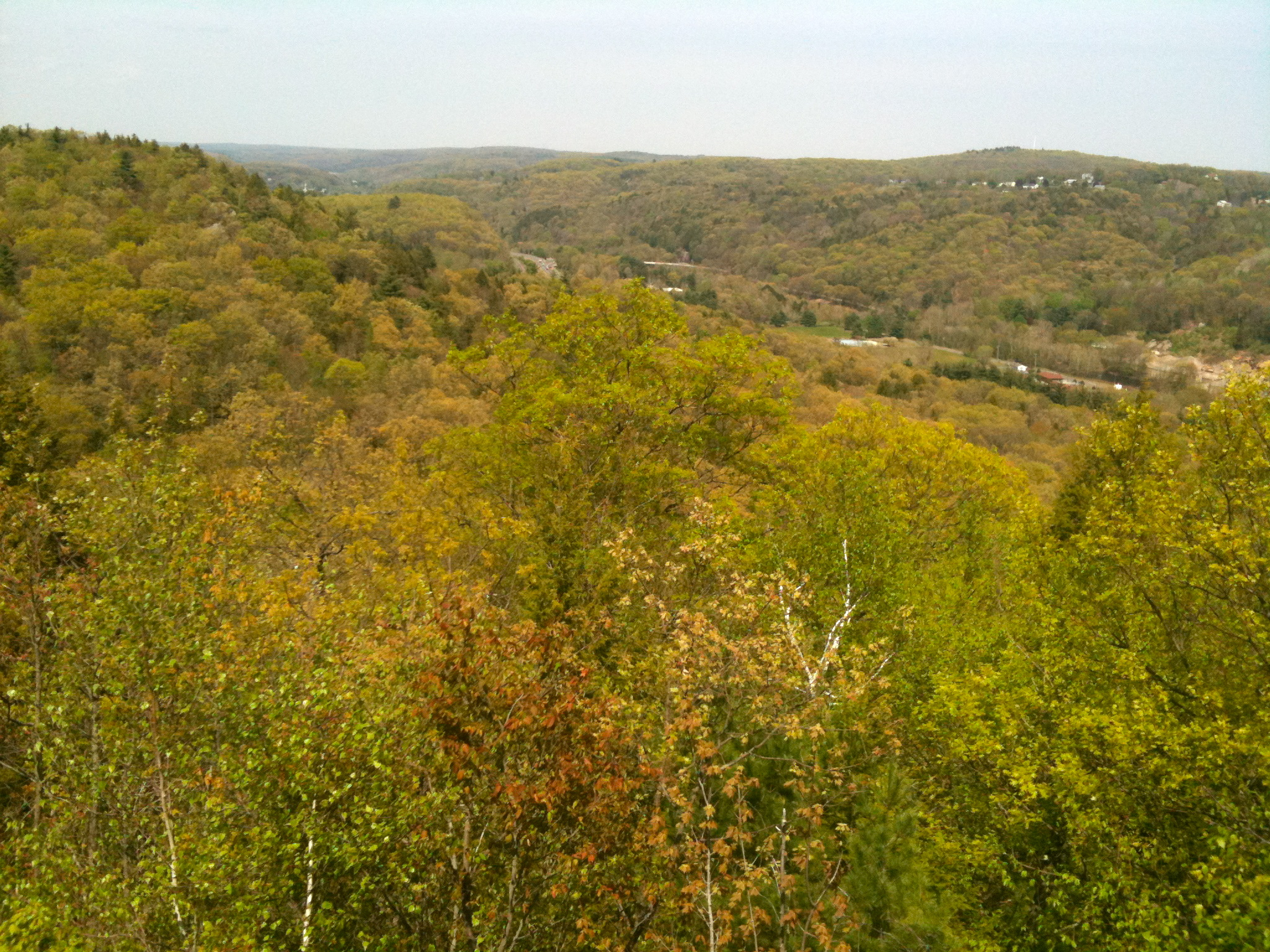

- Location within Connecticut Location within the United States
- Location: Connecticut, United States
- Coordinates: 41°38′34″N 73°06′02″W
- Area: 4,673 acres (1,891 ha)
- Elevation: 594 ft (181 m)
- Established: 1926
- Administrator: Connecticut Department of Energy and Environmental Protection
- Website: Official website

Mattatuck State Forest is an American state forest in the state of Connecticut, spread over twenty parcels in the towns of Waterbury, Plymouth, Thomaston, Watertown, Litchfield, and Harwinton. The Naugatuck River runs through a portion of the forest. The largest section of the forest is located about 1 mile (1.6 km) north of Waterbury. The Leatherman's Cave, named after the vagabond Leatherman of the late 19th century, is located in Thomaston near the Mattatuck Trail, 1/4 mile west of the junction with the Jericho Trail.

== Recreation opportunities ==
The forest is crossed by several Blue-Blazed Trails including the Jericho Trail, Hancock Brook Trail, and Whitestone Cliffs Trail.

Trails in the forest on the west side of Connecticut Route 8 include the following:

- The 3.4-mile Jericho Trail, which runs from Echo Lake Road in Watertown to the junction of the Mattatuck Trail, just west of Crane's Overlook and the Rock Hou
- Most of the 0.8-mile Branch Brook Trail is located in the forest, south of Reynolds Bridge Road in the town of Watertown.

Trails in the forest on the east side of Route 8 include the following:

- The 2.8-mile Hancock Brook Trail, which parallels the Waterbury Branch of Metro North.
- The 1.7-mile Whitestone Cliffs Trail, located off Connecticut Route 262.

The following trails are located on both sides of Connecticut Route 8:

- The 1.6-mile long Jericho-Whitestone Connector runs from Connecticut Route 262 to the Whitestone Cliffs Trail on the east side of Connecticut Route 8 in the towns of Thomaston and Plymouth.
- The Jericho-Whitestone Connector enters the forest north of the powerlines near Echo Lake Road in Watertown where it ends at the Jericho Trail.

The Mattatuck Trail traverses several blocks of the forest:

- In Plymouth, on the east side of Connecticut Route 8, the trail passes along an isolated block of the forest south of Scott Road, and another section south of Lake Plymouth extending to Mount Tobe Road.
- In Thomaston, on the east side of Connecticut Route 8, from Carter Road to Waterbury Road.
- In Watertown, on the west side of Connecticut Route 8, the trail passes by the highway, just south of Reynolds Bridge Road and extends to Bidwell Hill Road, where the trail enters the Black Rock State Park.

The Whitestone rock climbing area is within the largest section of forest just east of the Naugatuck River. Top-roping techniques are used for heights of about 50 feet (15 m). Trail access is from South Street.
