= Whitestone Cliffs Trail =

Hiking trail in Connecticut, US

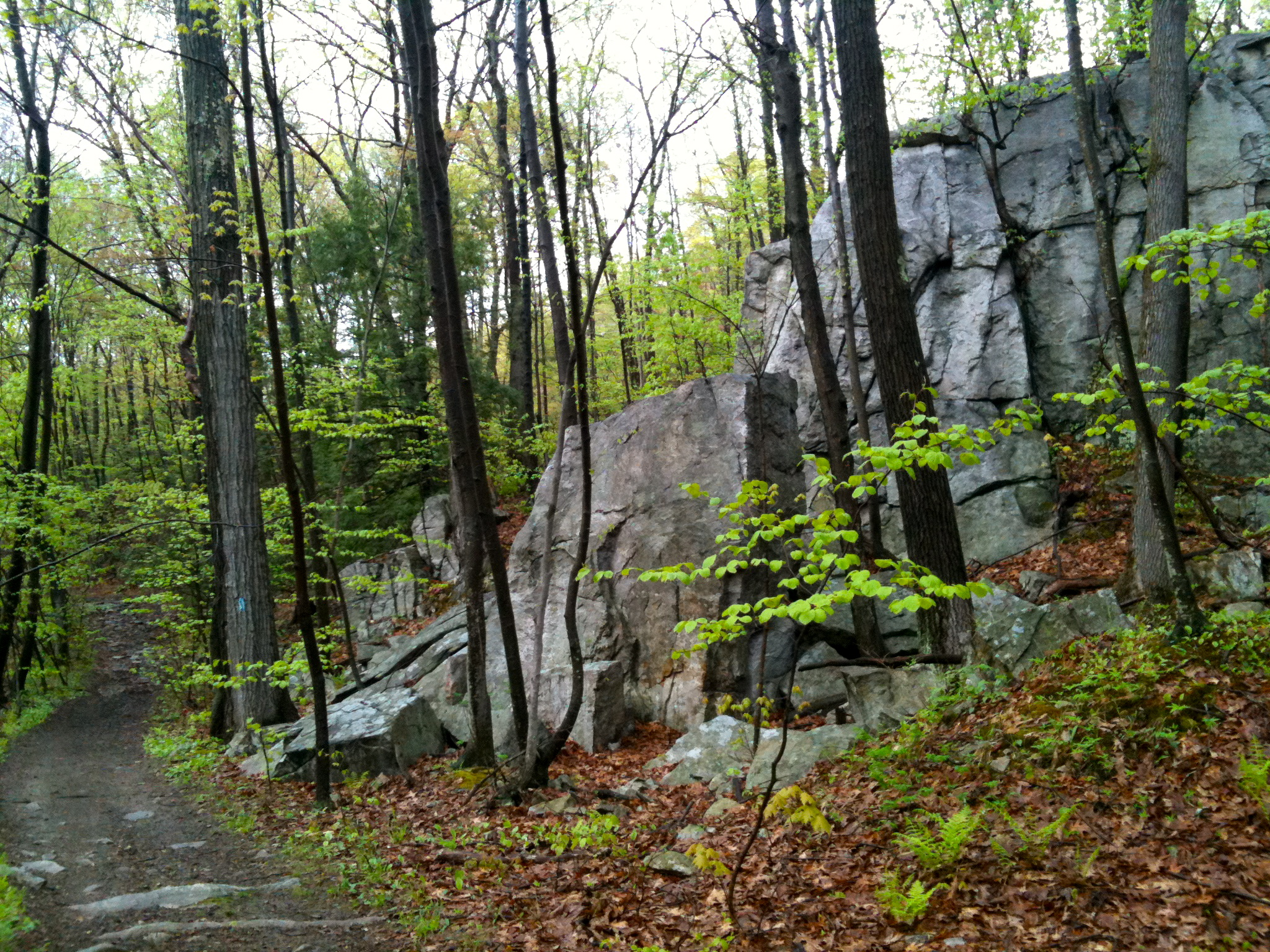
- White Stone cliffs along trail.
- Length: 1.7 miles (2.7 km)
- Location: Mattatuck State Forest, Thomaston / Plymouth, Litchfield County, Connecticut, USA
- Designation: CFPA Blue-Blazed Trail
- Use: hiking, cross-country skiing, snowshoeing, fishing, rock climbing
- Highest point: 750 ft (230 m)
- Lowest point: Naugatuck River 41.6156°N 73.0581°W
- Difficulty: Easy to moderate difficulty, some rock scrambling.
- Sights: Naugatuck River Valley, stone cliffs.
- Hazards: hunters, deer ticks, poison ivy

The Whitestone Cliffs Trail is a 1.7-mile (2.7 km) Blue-Blazed hiking trail in the Waterbury area in Thomaston and Plymouth, Litchfield County, Connecticut. It is contained almost entirely in a section of the Mattatuck State Forest. The mainline (official "Blue" "non-dot") trail is a loop trail with one connector trail (Blue-Blazed with yellow dot) to the Jericho Blue-Blazed Trail.

The trail is listed as one of the Waterbury area trails in the Connecticut Walk Book West.

The Whitestone Cliffs Trail is a loop trail with spurs at the loop's bottom leading to Connecticut Route 262 in both the east and west directions. The eastern spur terminates at the trail's parking lot. The western spur is the Jericho Connector trail which leaves Mattatuck State Forest, travels alongside the Naugatuck River before crossing it using Connecticut Route 262 and before heading under Route 8.

Notable features include a 750 foot summit and several overlook views. The trail goes near, but does not summit, Mount Tobe. The trail is maintained largely through the efforts of the Connecticut Forest and Park Association.

== Trail description ==
Located in Mattatuck State Forest, the Whitestone Cliffs Trail is a loop through streams, wetlands and rocky knolls with views of Naugatuck Valley.

The Whitestone Cliffs Trail is primarily used for hiking, backpacking, rock climbing, and in the winter, snowshoing.

Portions of the trail are suitable for, and are used for, cross-country skiing. Site-specific activities enjoyed along the route include bird watching, hunting (very limited), fishing, horseback riding, bouldering and rock climbing (limited).

=== Trail route ===
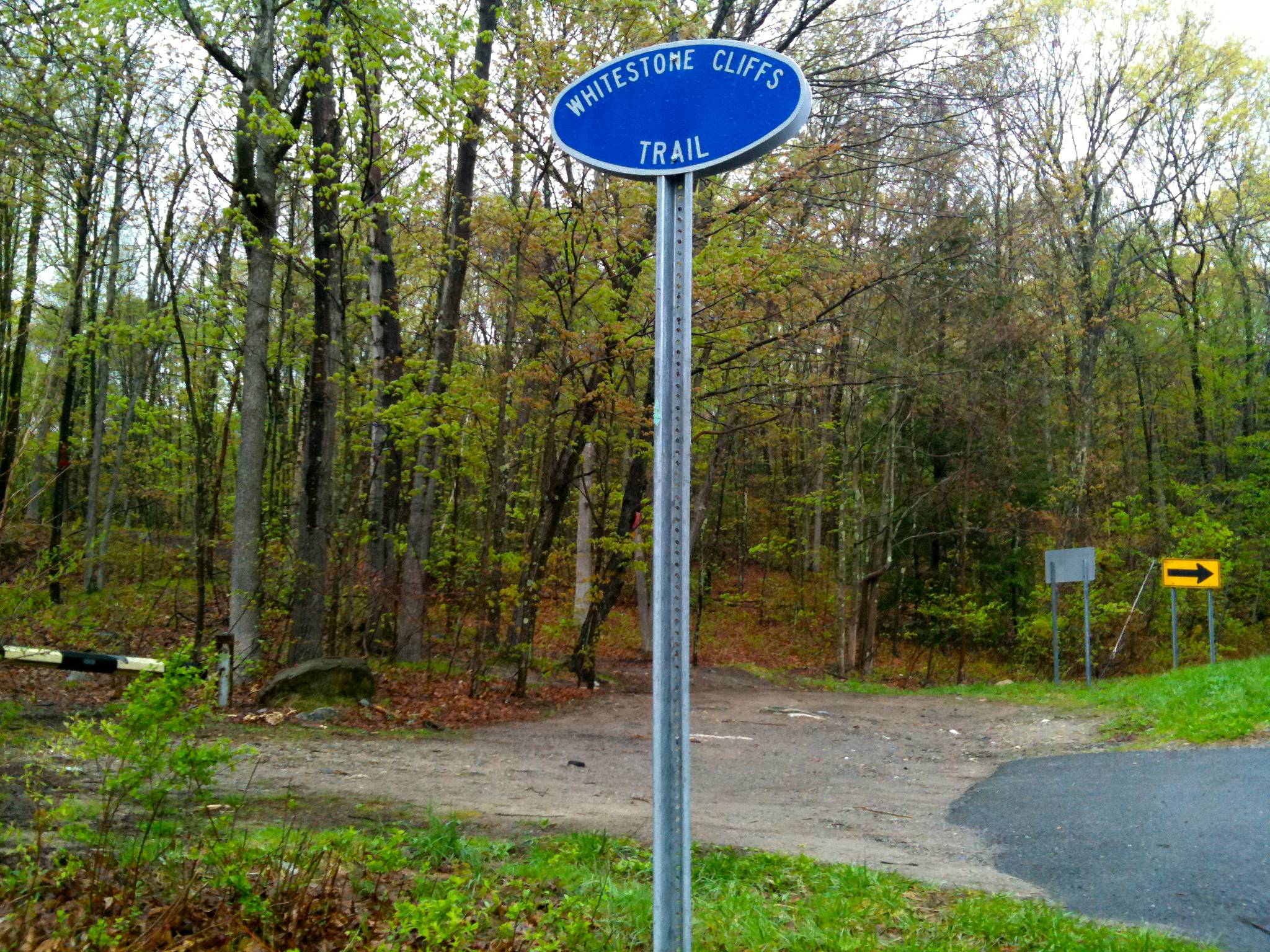
Whitestone Cliffs Trail terminus sign and parking lot on Spruce Brook Road / Mt Tobe Road.

The mainline trail is a rectangular/oval loop bounded by Route 262 on both the east and west (and by the Naugatuck River, rail road track and Route 8 a bit farther away but parallel to the western border).

The loop on the trail can be reached by a straight east-west spur from the Spruce Brook Road / Mount Tobe Road parking lot to the east or by the east-west Jericho Connector Trail from the west.

Several unmarked trails, dirt forest roads and seasonal streams cut across the trail.

The trail is entirely on Mattatuck State Forest property.

=== Trail communities ===
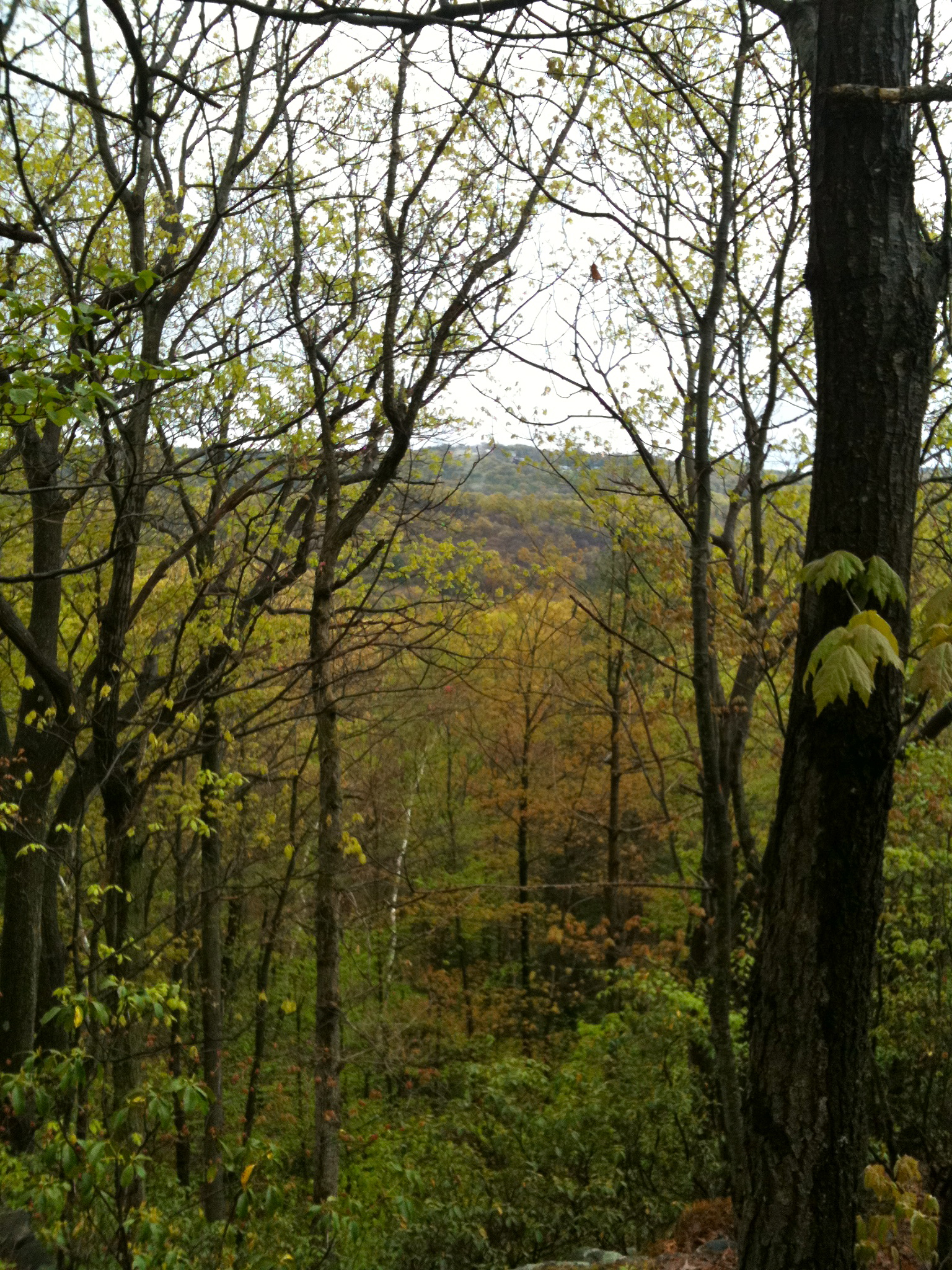
Scenic view from 750 foot high point on Whitestone Cliffs Trail

The official Blue-Blazed Whitestone Cliffs Trail passes through land located within the following Litchfield County municipalities, from east to west: Plymouth, Thomaston

== Landscape, geology, and natural environment ==
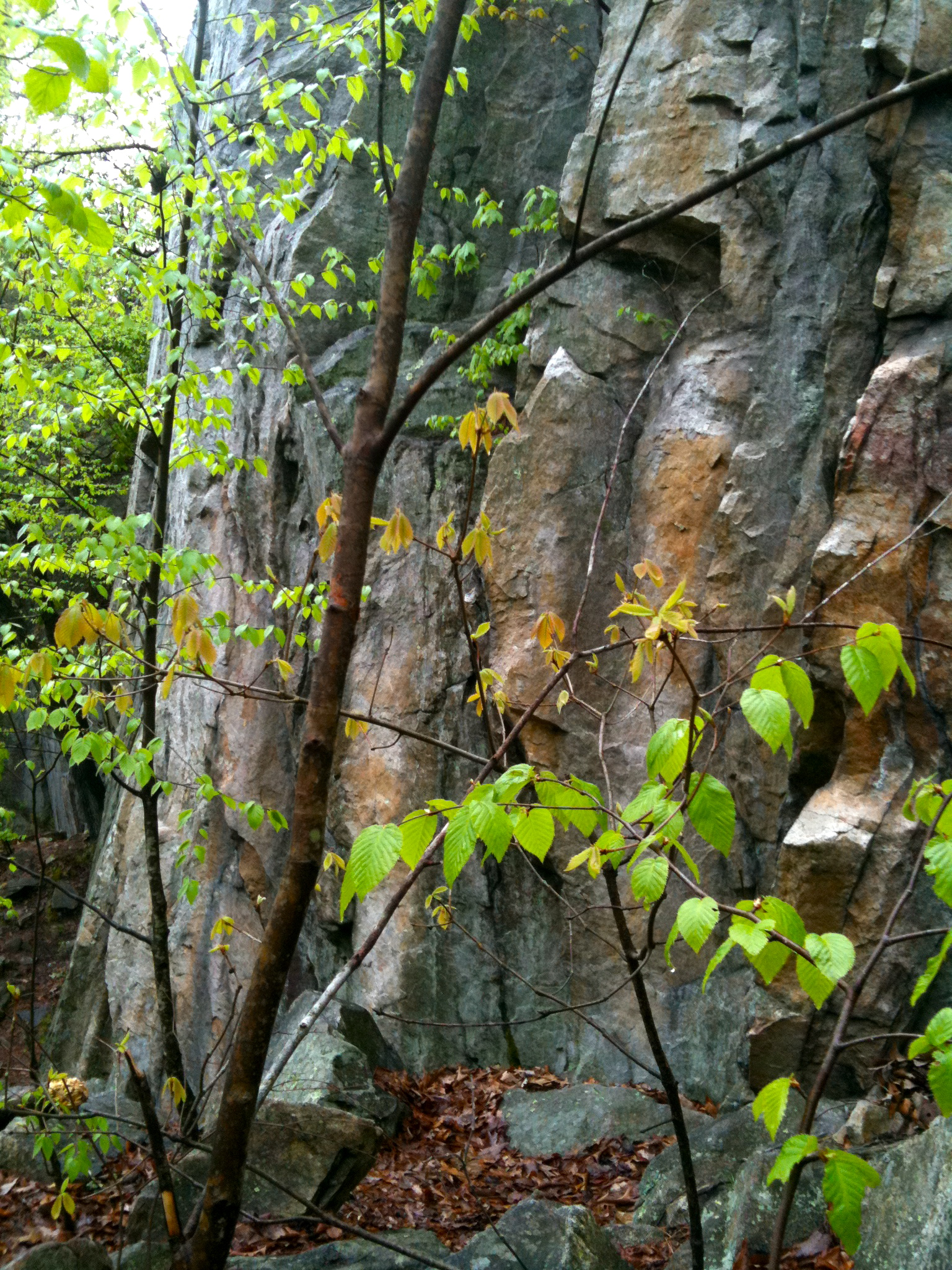
White Stone Cliff

There are reports of small localized tremors and other geologic activity involving the White Cliffs, specifically involving an area less than one hundred feet in length on an eastern cliff edge in the Mattatuck State Forest facing Spruce Brook Road.

== History and folklore ==
The Blue-Blazed Whitestone Cliffs Trail was created by the Connecticut Forest and Park Association.

=== Origin and name ===
The trail is named for high stone cliffs which appear white when viewed from the Naugatuck River and Connecticut Route 8.

=== Historic sites ===
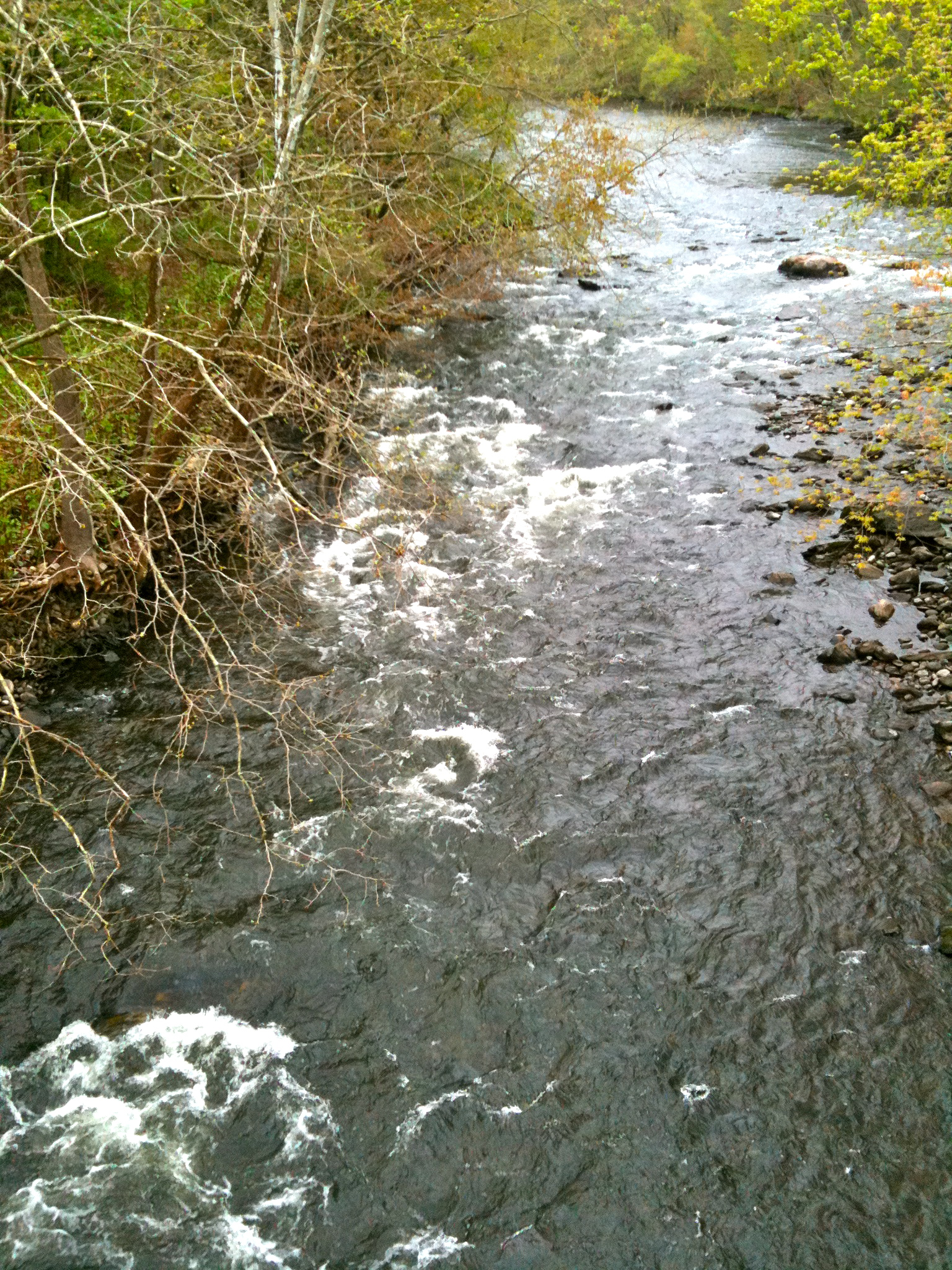
Naugatuck River from Jericho Connector Trail (road walk over Frost Bridge on CT Route 262)

In the early 1840s, the Naugatuck Railroad laid track parallel to the Naugatuck River near the Whitestone Cliffs western border. This line connected Winsted Connecticut to New Haven Connecticut with several stops in between including Thomaston and Waterbury Connecticut. The company built a spur rail line to their quarrying operation on the western edge of the white cliffs to produce stone material for railroad bridge abutments.

The pavilion near the trail head and parking lot was erected for an archery group which conducted target practice in this area of Mattatuck State Forest in the latter half of the twentieth century. There were once archery range markers in the woods close to the pavilion.

=== Folklore ===
There is a bit of local lore (with some basis in fact) that a colonial settler living in the area in the late seventeenth or early eighteenth century was killed by a Native American. The cavity in the earth left by a long-gone house's stone cellar can be glimpsed from the trail on a ridge seventy to eighty meters from the trail's terminus and parking lot area. There is no evidence that this is where the killing took place though some may think so.

== Hiking the trail ==
The mainline trail is blazed with blue rectangles. Trail descriptions are available from a number of commercial and non-commercial sources, and a complete guidebook is published by the Connecticut Forest and Park Association

Weather along the route is typical of Connecticut. Conditions on exposed ridge tops and summits may be harsher during cold or stormy weather. Lightning is a hazard on exposed summits and ledges during thunderstorms. Snow is common in the winter and may necessitate the use of snowshoes. Ice can form on exposed ledges and summits, making hiking dangerous without special equipment.

Several sections of the trail are in low-lying areas or next to (or become) seasonal streams. Extensive flooding in ponds, puddles and streams may occur in the late winter or early spring, overflowing into the trail and causing very muddy conditions. In this case, fairly high waterproof boots are recommended. Some parts of the trail follow forest roads which often contain a lot of loose stones or ruts from ATVs and four-wheel drive vehicles.

Biting insects can be bothersome during warm weather. Parasitic deer ticks (which are known to carry Lyme disease) are a potential hazard.

The trail is in Mattatuck State Forest where hunting and the use of firearms are permitted in season. Wearing bright orange clothing during the hunting season (Fall through December) is recommended.

== Conservation and maintenance of the trail corridor ==
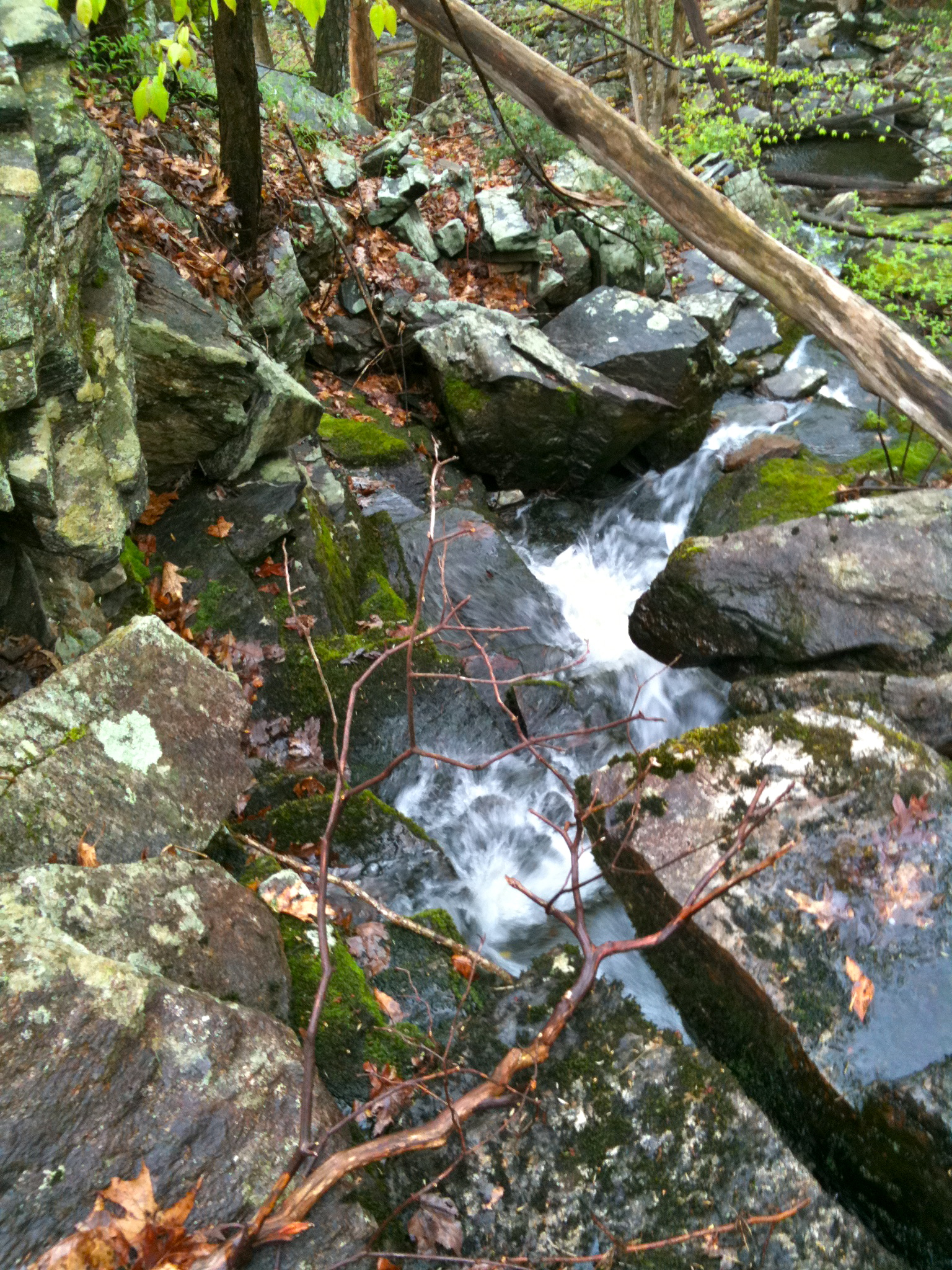
Seasonal brook on trail.

== See also ==
- Blue-Blazed Trails
- Mattatuck State Forest
- Naugatuck Railroad
- Naugatuck River
