= Mattatuck Trail =

Hiking trail in Connecticut, United States

Coordinates: 41°49′19.6″N 73°17′55.2″W

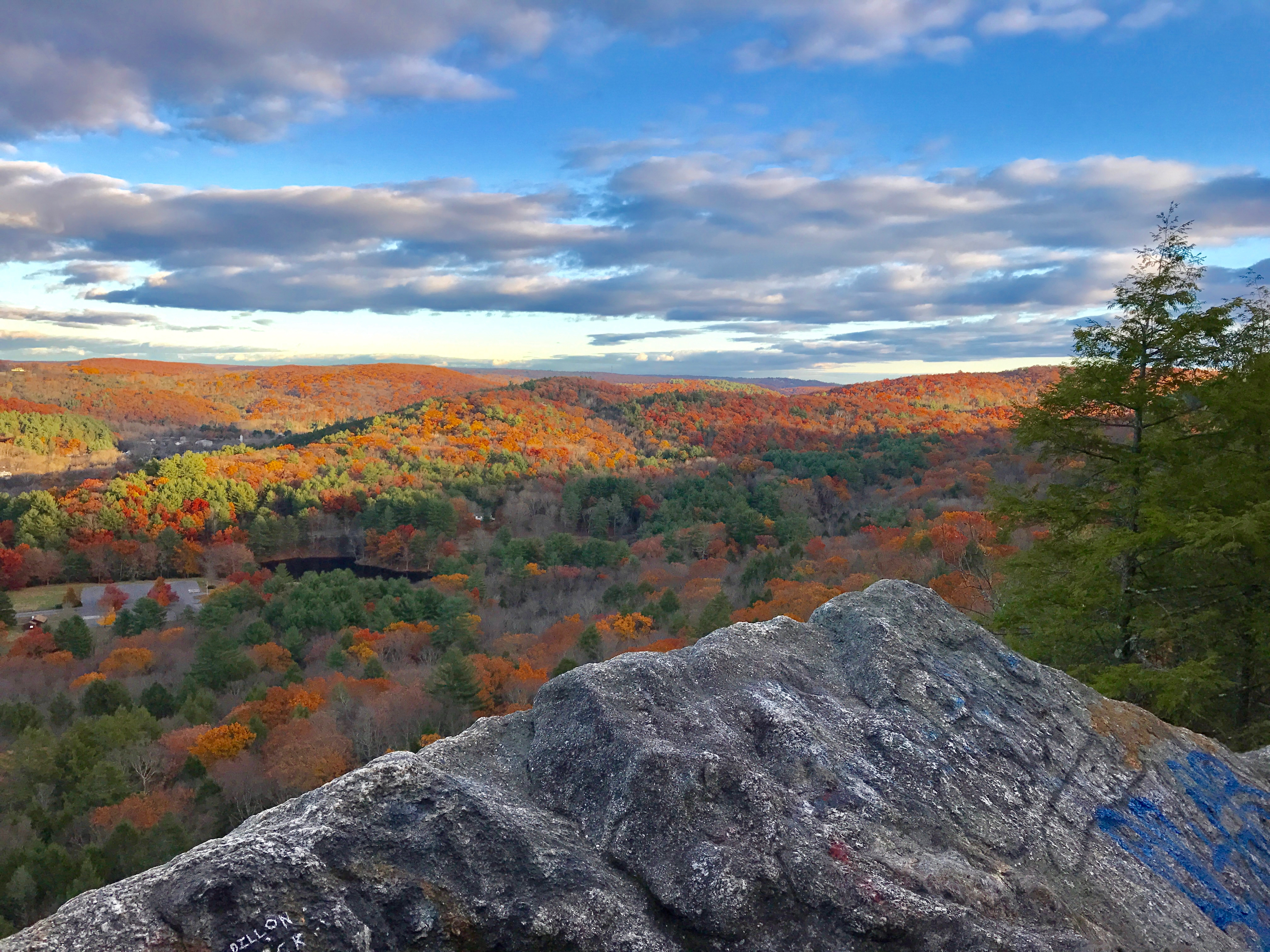
- Scenic view north from the Mattatuck Trail at the top of Black Rock (in Black Rock State Park, Watertown, Connecticut).
- Length: 42.2 miles (67.9 km)
- Location: Wolcott, Plymouth, Thomaston, Watertown, Morris, Litchfield, Warren, Cornwall, Goshen Connecticut
- Designation: CFPA Blue-Blazed Trail
- Use: hiking, cross-country skiing, snowshoeing, fishing, mountain biking (parts of the trail), other
- Highest point: Mohawk Mountain, 1,683 ft (513 m)
- Lowest point: Naugatuck River, 347 ft (106 m)
- Difficulty: Easy, Strenuous
- Season: All
- Months: 12
- Sights: Indian Jack Cave, Buttermilk Falls, Ed's Big Pebble, Leatherman's Cave, Crane's Lookout, Black Rock, Prospect Mountain, Mohawk Mountain, Cunningham Tower
- Hazards: hunters, deer ticks, poison ivy

The Mattatuck Trail is an 42.2-mile (67.9 km) Blue-Blazed hiking trail that winds through Litchfield County and New Haven County in Western Connecticut.

The mainline (official "Blue" "non-dot") trail is a fragmented linear trail with a northern trailhead which terminates at the Mohawk Trail in Mohawk State Forest in Cornwall Connecticut.

The trail's southern terminus is in Peterson Park in Wolcott, Connecticut. Traveling northwestward the trail traverses Buttermilk Falls, several Mattatuck State Forest parcels in Plymouth and into Thomaston before crossing the Naugatuck River and Connecticut Route 8 at Reynolds Bridge.

The trail then travels across Black Rock State Park from east to west before passing to the west of the Wigwam, Morris and Pitch Reservoirs in Watertown and Morris. The trail passes west across Connecticut Route 63 onto the lands of the White Memorial Conservation Center in Litchfield Connecticut where the southeast trail section ends in a parking lot near Connecticut Route 202.

There is a new short disconnected segment approximately 2.5 miles to the northwest on Prospect Mountain in the Prospect Mountain Preserve.

The trail begins again to the north in Warren Connecticut at the end of Valley Road at the Shepaug River and Litchfield-Warren border. It passes on the east side of a Wyantenock State Forest parcel on the west side of the Shepaug and Cairns Reservoirs through Warren before entering another Wyantenock State Forest parcel at the Cornwall town line. It then enters Mohawk State Forest, briefly crosses into Goshen Connecticut for a very short distance, goes over Mohawk Mountain and Tower before ending at the Mohawk Trail near the Mohawk Mountain Ski Area.

== See also ==
- Black Rock State Park
- Mattatuck State Forest
- Wyantenock State Forest
- Mohawk State Forest
- Mohawk Mountain
- Blue-Blazed Trails
