= Hancock Brook Trail =

Hiking trail in Connecticut, United States

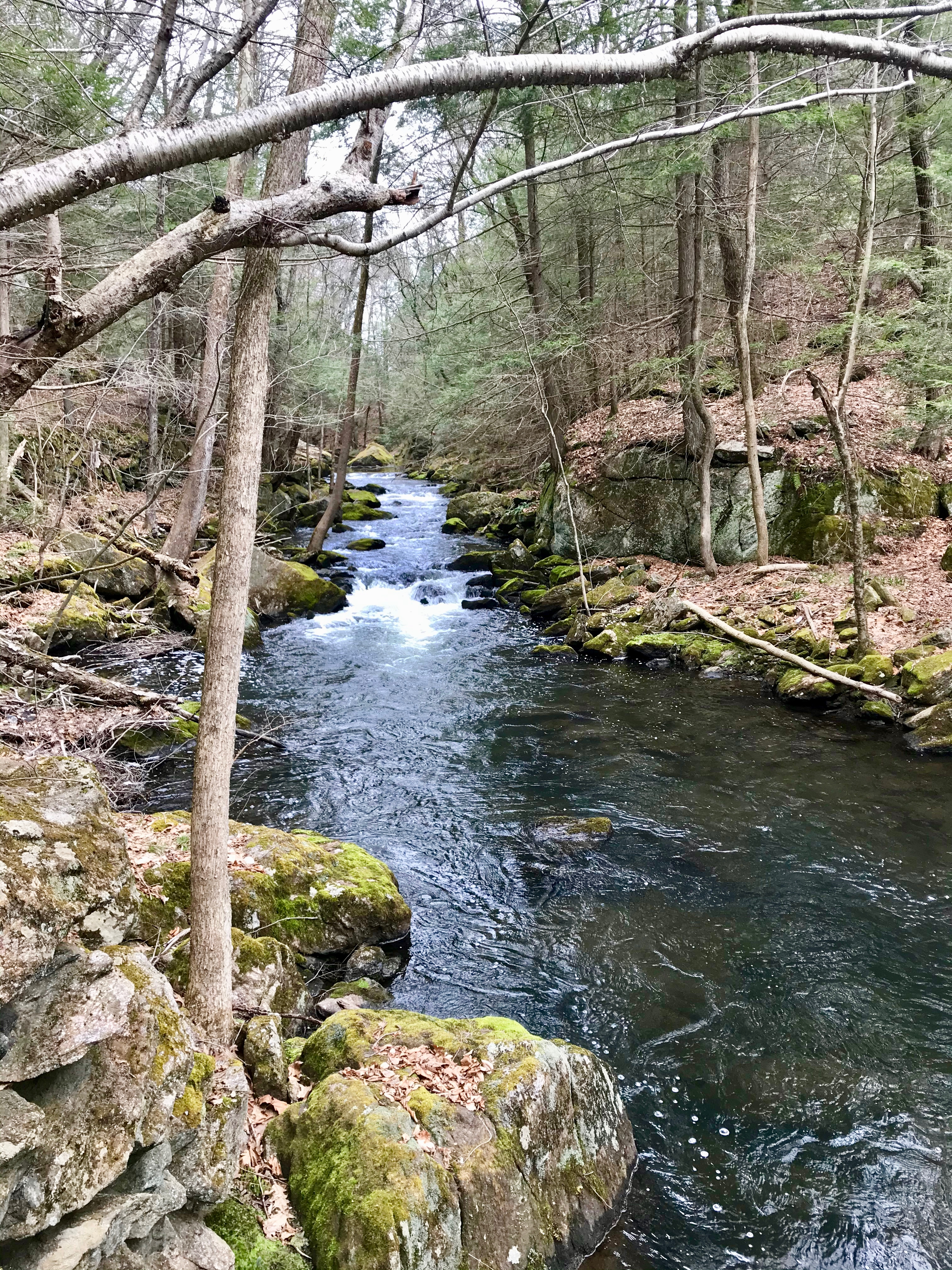
- Hancock Brook along Hancock Brook Trail.
- Length: 2.8 miles (4.5 km)
- Location: Mattatuck State Forest, Waterville Section of the City of Waterbury near the Thomaston and Plymouth border, New Haven County, Connecticut
- Designation: CFPA Blue-Blazed Trail
- Use: hiking, cross-country skiing, snowshoeing, fishing, rock climbing
- Highest point: Lion Head, 660 ft (200 m)
- Lowest point: Hancock Brook
- Difficulty: Easy to moderate difficulty, some rock scrambling.
- Sights: Hancock Brook and valley, stone walls along brook, railroad tracks, scenic views from ridge.
- Hazards: hunters, deer ticks, poison ivy

The 'Hancock Brook Trail' is a 2.8-mile (4.5 km) Blue-Blazed hiking trail Waterville Section of the City of Waterbury in New Haven County close to the borders of Thomaston and Plymouth, Litchfield County, Connecticut. It is contained overwhelmingly in a section of the Mattatuck State Forest bounded by Hancock Brook on the east, Thomaston Avenue on the west and Spruce Brook Road / Route 262 to the north.

The 'Hancock Brook Trail' is listed as one of the Waterbury area trails in the Connecticut Walk Book West.

The Hancock Brook Trail is a highly linear loop trail composed of two parallel north-south trails connected at the north and south. The eastern trail follows the western shore of Hancock Brook. The western trail follows the ridge line rising up a few yards from the western shore of the Hancock Brook.

Notable features include a 660-foot summit (Lion Head 41.6038°N 73.0509°W) and several overlook views. The trail is maintained largely through the efforts of the Connecticut Forest and Park Association.

== Trail description ==
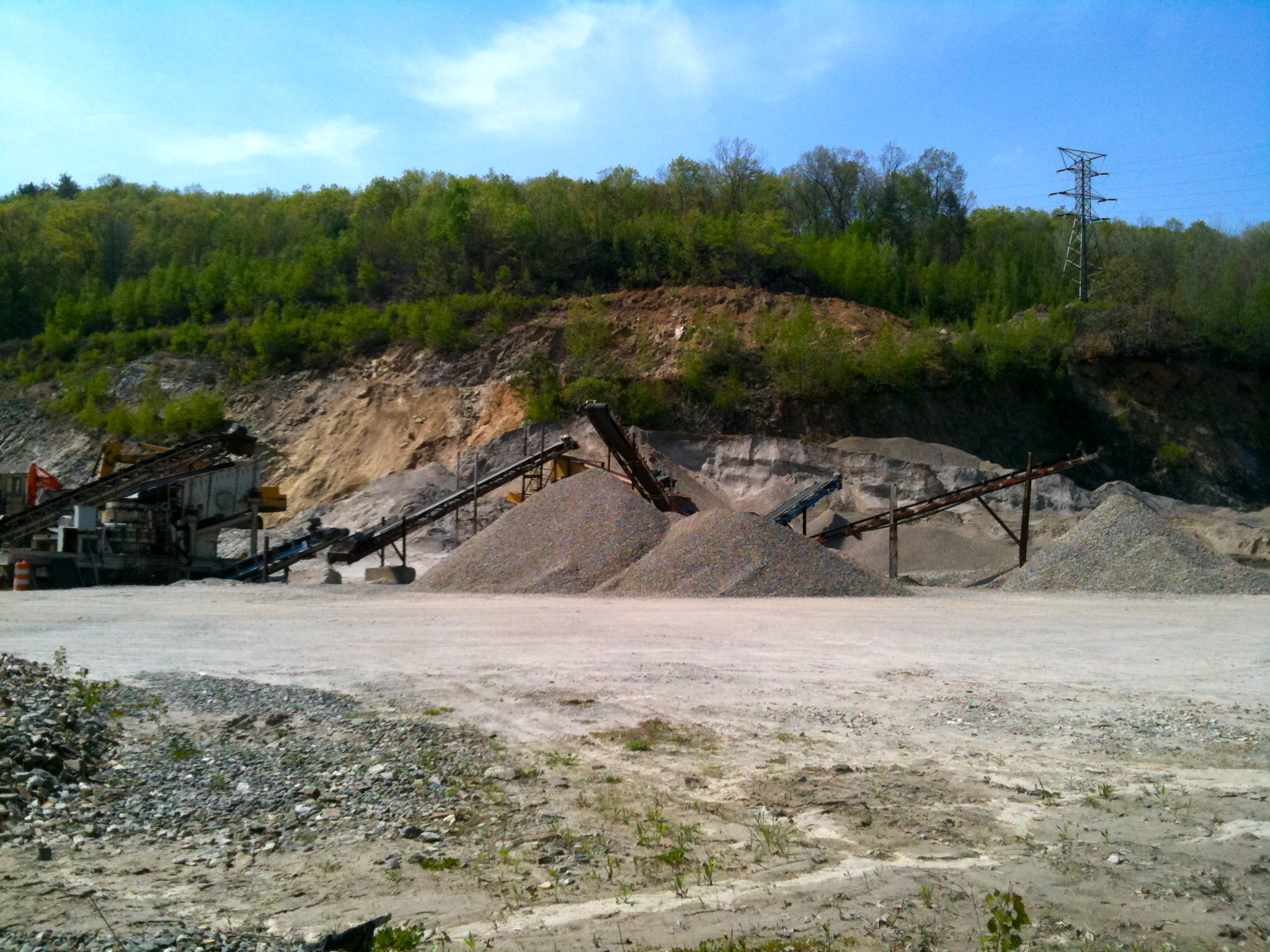
Quarry at Hancock Brook Trailhead, end of Sheffield Street, Waterville, Waterbury.

The Hancock Brook Trail is primarily used for hiking, backpacking, rock climbing, and in the winter, snowshoeing.

Portions of the trail are suitable for, and are used for, cross-country skiing and geocaching. Site-specific activities enjoyed along the route include bird watching, hunting (very limited), fishing, horseback riding, bouldering and rock climbing (limited).

There is ATV and dirt bike (motocross) use on the trail in violation of the prohibition on state forest lands.

=== Trail route ===
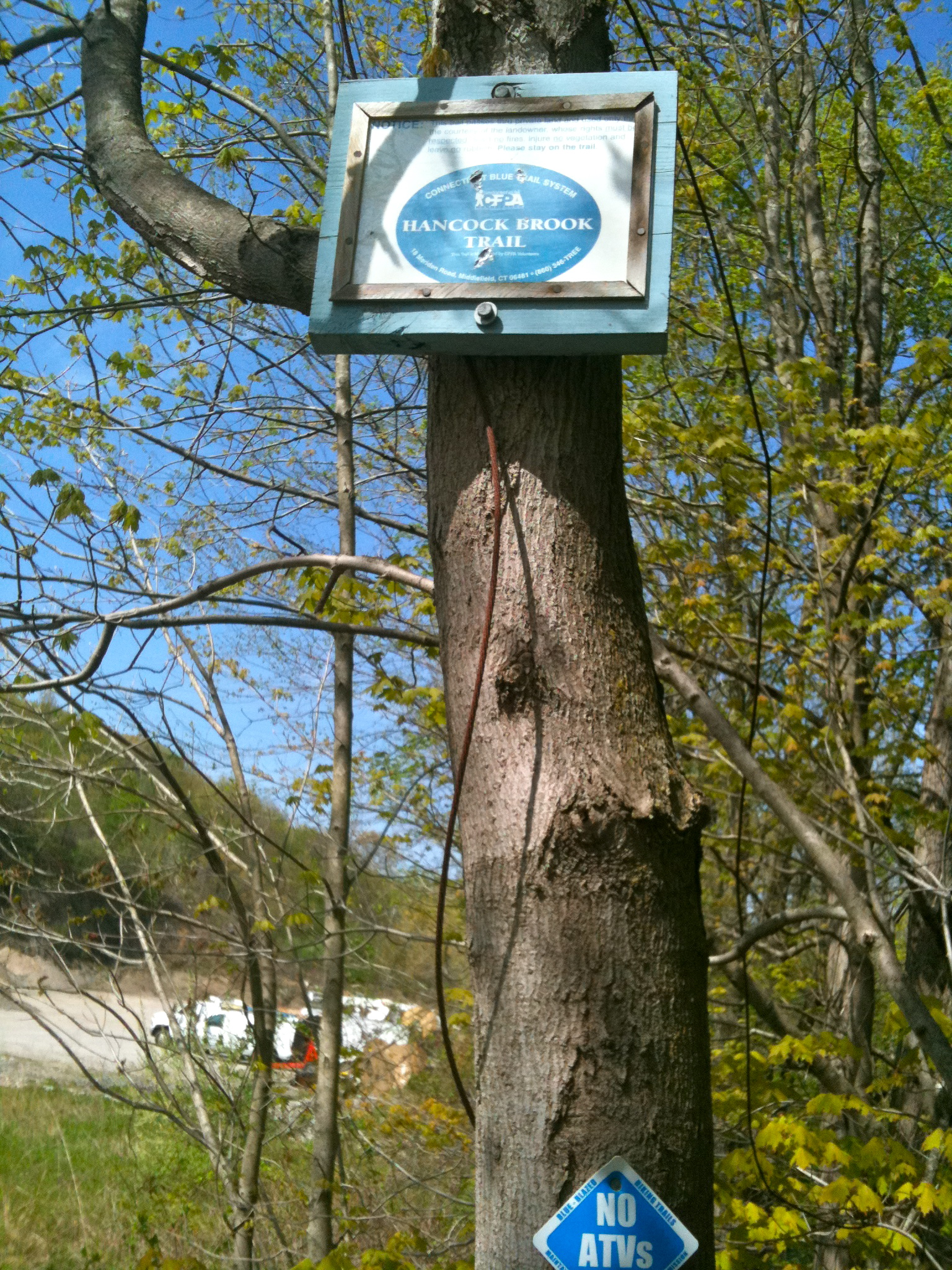
Trailhead for Hancock Brook Trail at end of Sheffield Street, Waterville, Waterbury.

The mainline trail is a highly linear loop bounded by Hancock Brook on east. The western north-south trail parallels the eastern trail and Hancock Brook.

The loop on the trail can be reached by a straight east-west spur from a small parking area at the end of Sheffield Street.

There are a few unmarked trails, dirt forest roads and seasonal streams which cut across the trail.

The trail is almost entirely on Mattatuck State Forest property (except for the right of way alongside the quarry at the trail head).

=== Trail communities ===
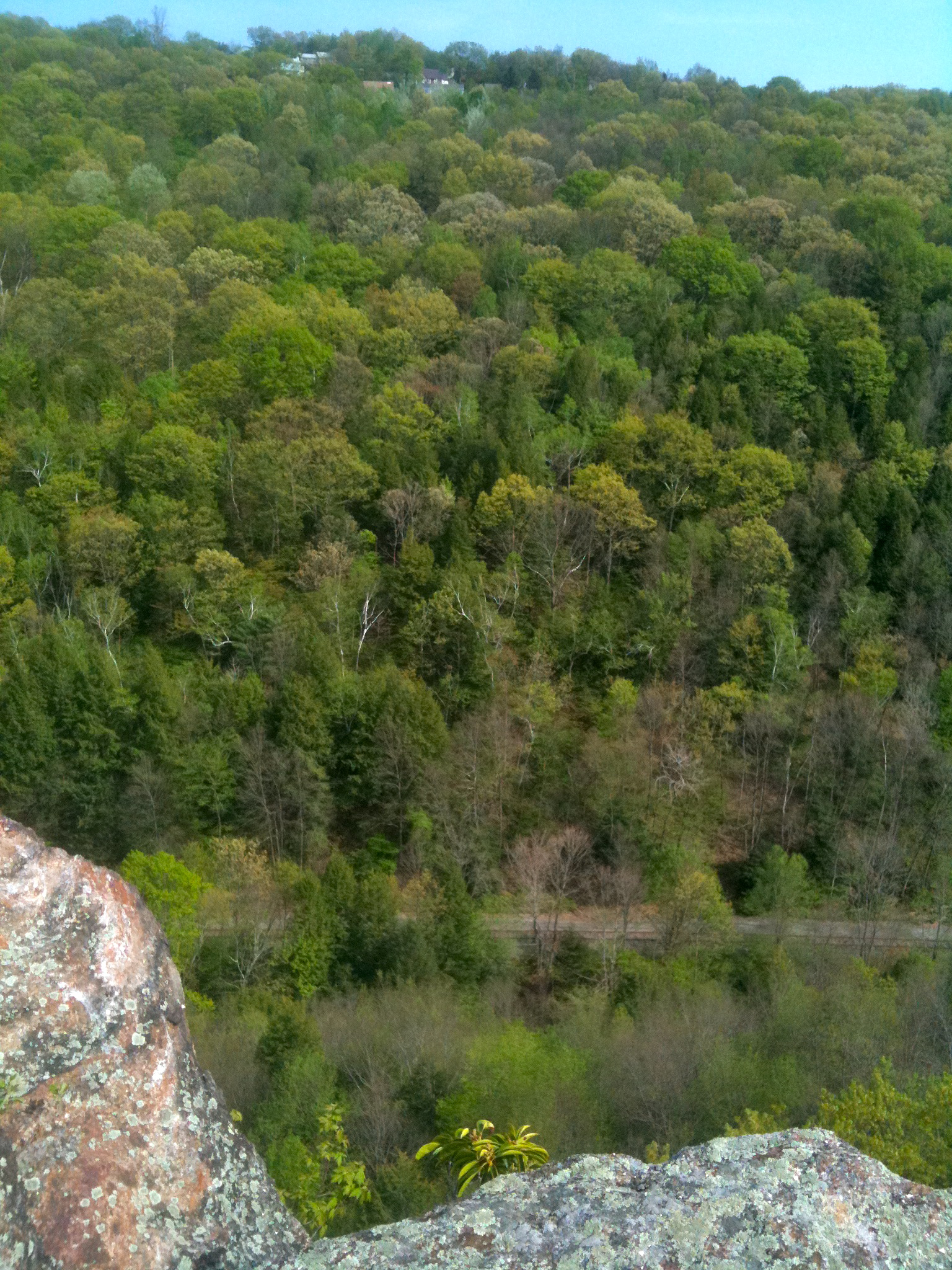
Scenic view from 660 foot Lion Head high point on Hancock Brook Trail. Houses on top of remote ridge, railroad tracks at bottom of valley.

The official Blue-Blazed Hancock Brook Trail is entirely located within the Waterville section of the city of Waterbury in New Haven County.

== History and folklore ==
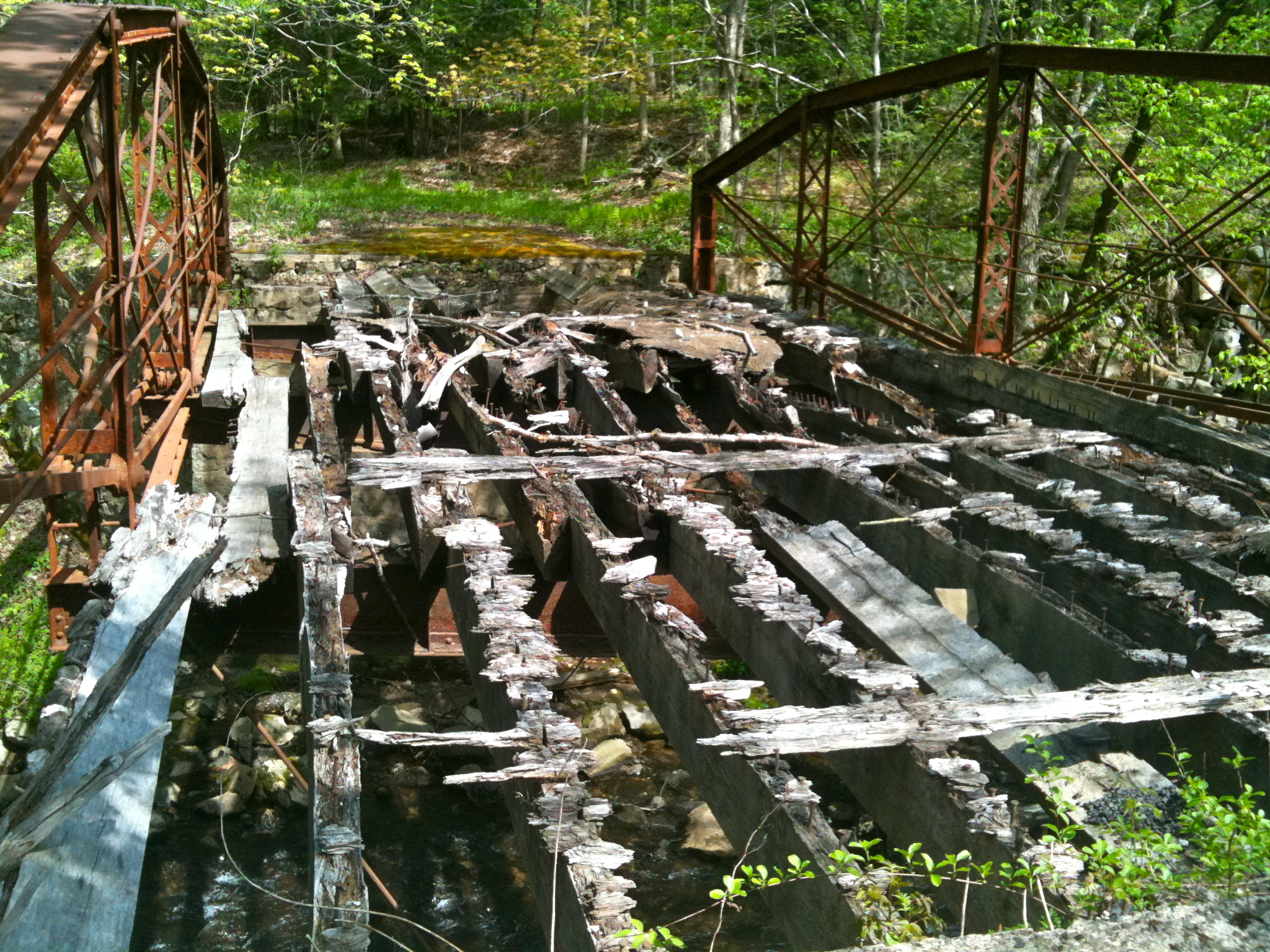
Bridge ruins at Sheffield Street trailhead.

The Blue-Blazed Hancock Brook Trail was created by the Connecticut Forest and Park Association.

=== Origin and name ===
The trail is named for Hancock Brook which the trail follows on both the east and west sections of the loop.

=== Historic sites ===
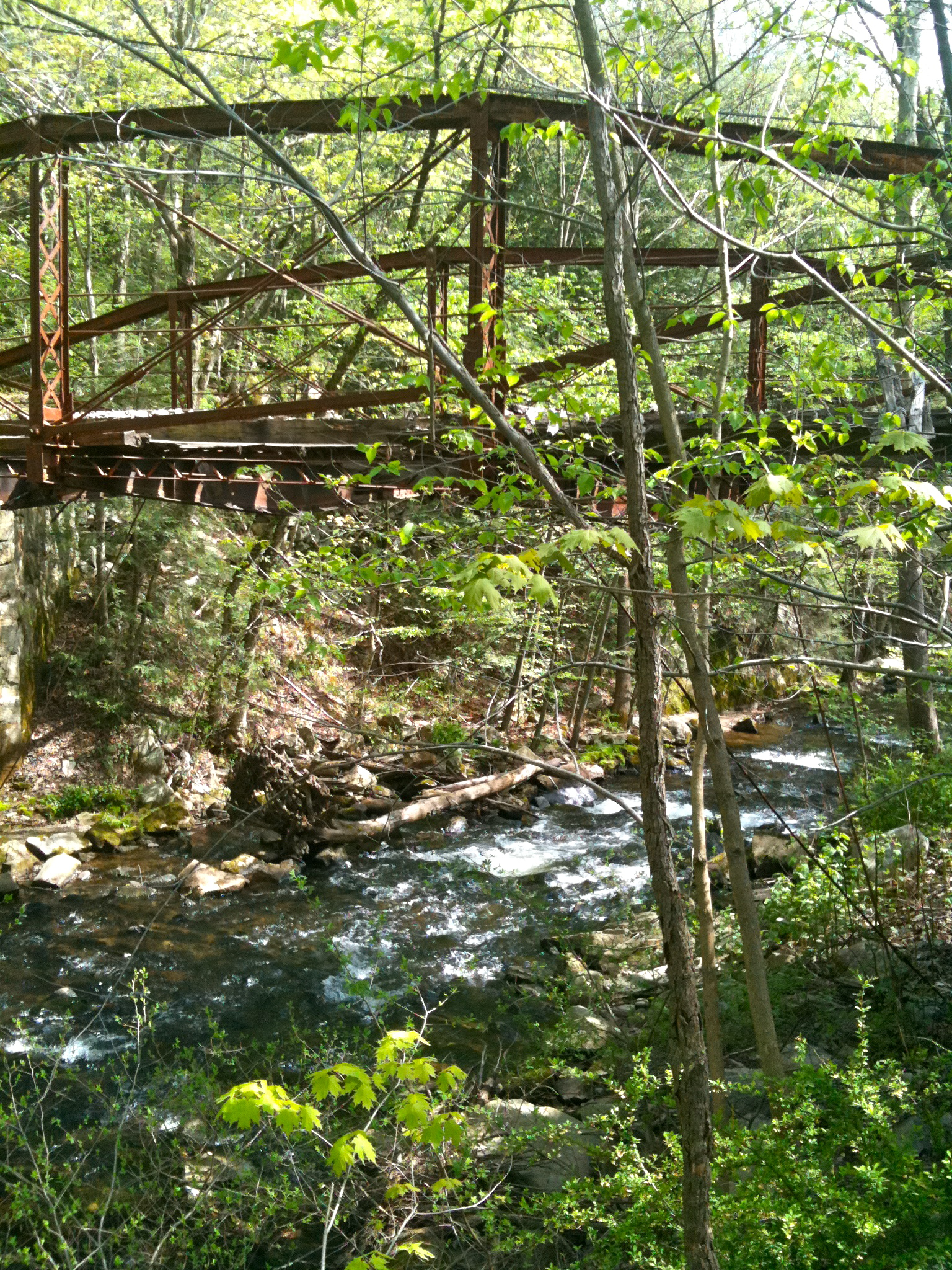
Condemned bridge over Hancock Brook at Sheffield Street trailhead.

The Sheffield Street over Hancock Brook (State Bridge No. 5038) is now a condemned ruins blocked from any traffic by concrete barriers. A sign is posted warning that no vehicular nor pedestrian traffic may cross it (it is extremely dangerous).

The Sheffield Street Bridge is listed on the National Register of Historic Places. It is a fifty-six foot 'iron bridge (a lenticular pony truss) which was built in 1884 by the Berlin Iron Bridge Company.

Sheffield Street is now closed where the bridge, quarry and Hancock Brook Trail meet. It was once a major thoroughfare in Waterville carrying manufactured goods (including cutlery and brass pins) from large Waterville factories. The bridge was specially designed to withstand the transport of these manufacturer's heavy loads.

The railroad track on the eastern bank of Hancock Brook was built in 1850, to complete the Hartford, Provence and Fishkill railroad. Construction of the new railroad line began in 1907, because of treacherous turns and a tragic grade at the Pequabuck section of Plymouth, CT. The main focus was the Sullivan hill tunnel, while the remaining sections of the line in Hancock where straightened. In 1940, one track was removed from the original double track, and the other was moved to the middle. This included abandoning the railroad bridge on Hancock Dam, where two great peninsulas remain. The line was also moved out of the way of Greystone pond, and relocated to the other side. The last passenger train to be operated in the area was in January 1960. This specific area was well known for the amount of hermits that used the line to get from Bristol, CT to Waterbury, Connecticut, one of these hermits was known as a hero, for spotting a boulder that rolled off Lionhead mountain, the hermit ran to the nearest train station in Greystone, and warned the man at the office- he was known as a hero of Plymouth, CT and was rewarded a lifetime of food and water, supplied by the town.

== Hiking the trail ==
The mainline trail is blazed with blue rectangles. Trail descriptions are available from a number of commercial and non-commercial sources, and a complete guidebook is published by the Connecticut Forest and Park Association

Weather along the route is typical of Connecticut. Conditions on exposed ridge tops and summits may be harsher during cold or stormy weather. Lightning is a hazard on exposed summits and ledges during thunderstorms. Snow is common in the winter and may necessitate the use of snowshoes. Ice can form on exposed ledges and summits, making hiking dangerous without special equipment.

The eastern section of the trail is usually high enough on the western bank of Hancock Brook that flooding is a rare event. However, there are some low-lying areas which may become puddles or seasonal streams.

Extensive flooding in ponds, puddles and streams may occur in the late winter or early spring, overflowing into the trail and causing very muddy conditions. In this case fairly high waterproof boots are recommended. Some parts of the trail follow forest roads which often contain a lot of loose stones or ruts from ATVs and four-wheel drive vehicles.

Biting insects can be bothersome during warm weather. Parasitic deer ticks (which are known to carry Lyme disease) are a potential hazard.

The trail is in Mattatuck State Forest where hunting and the use of firearms are permitted in season. Wearing bright orange clothing during the hunting season (Fall through December) is recommended.

== Conservation and maintenance of the trail corridor ==
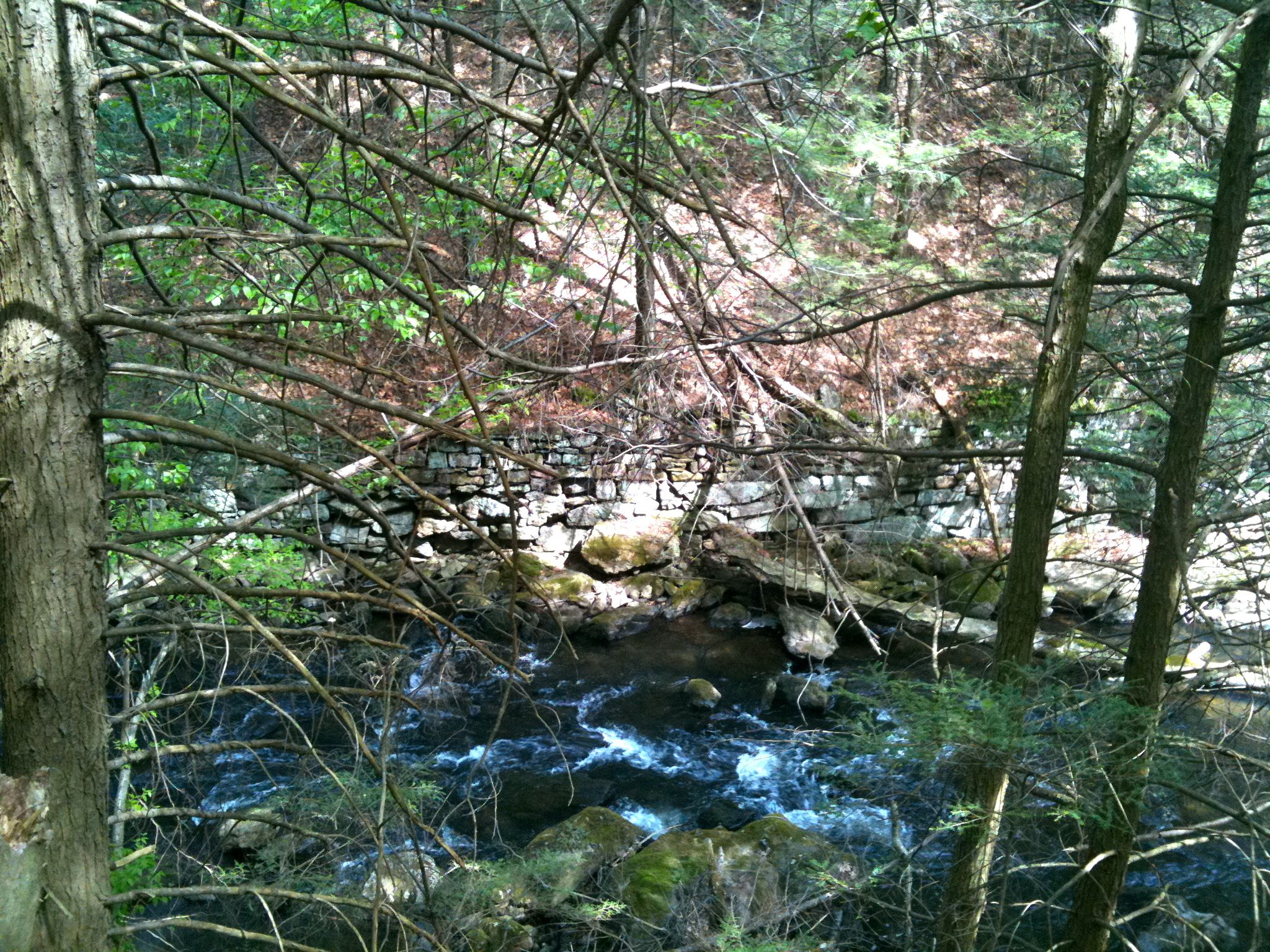
Stone Wall on Hancock Brook's eastern bank.

== See also ==
- Blue-Blazed Trails
- Mattatuck State Forest
- Naugatuck Railroad
- Naugatuck River
- Waterbury
- Waterville
