= Black Rock State Park =

State park in Litchfield County, Connecticut

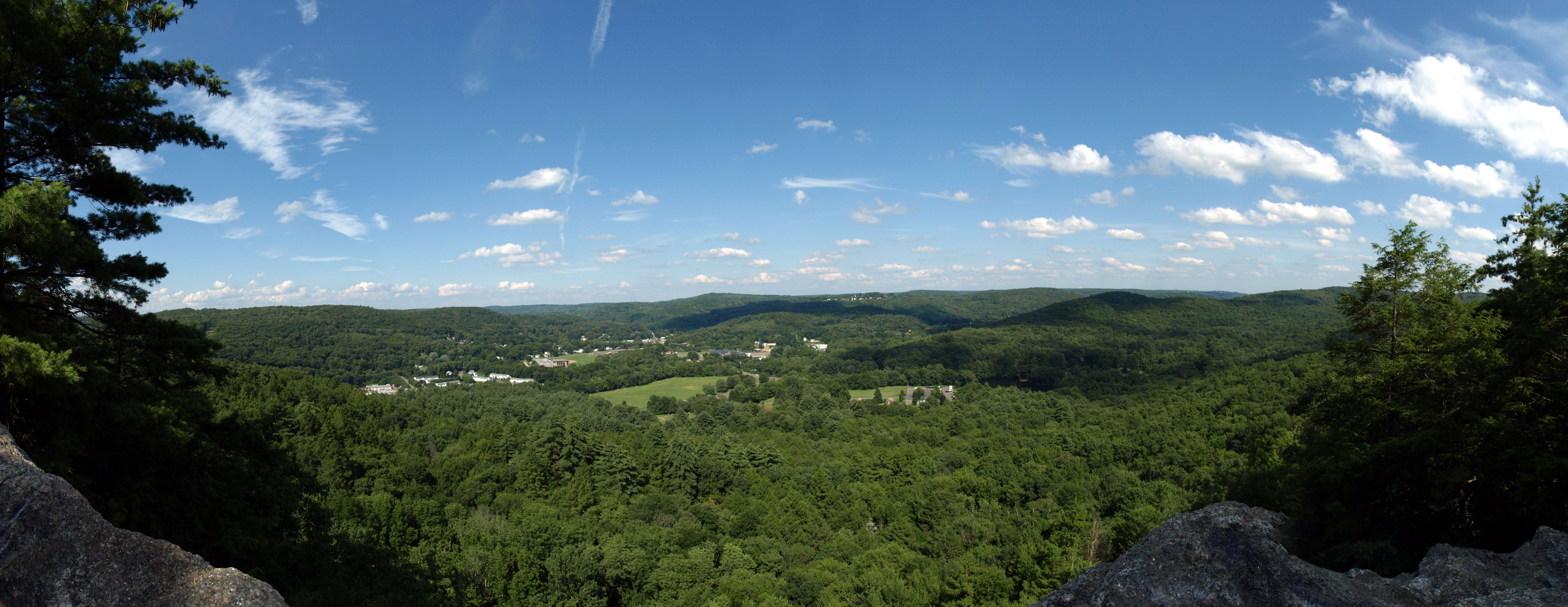
- Scenic view from Black Rock

- Location within Connecticut Location within the United States
- Interactive map of Black Rock State Park
- Location: Watertown, Connecticut, United States
- Coordinates: 41°39′05″N 73°06′17″W
- Area: 444 acres (180 ha)
- Elevation: 771 feet (235 m)
- Established: 1926
- Administrator: Connecticut Department of Energy and Environmental Protection
- Designation: Connecticut state park
- Website: Official website

Black Rock State Park is a seasonal public recreation area adjoining Mattatuck State Forest in the town of Watertown, Connecticut. The state park covers 444 acres (180 ha) and is known for its large rock face, Black Rock, that offers views of Thomaston, Watertown, and portions of Waterbury. The park is managed by the Connecticut Department of Energy and Environmental Protection.

== History ==
The park saw its origins in 1926 with the donation of 19 parcels totaling 254 acres by the citizen's conservation group Black Rock Forest, Inc. The Civilian Conservation Corps contributed to the park's development in the 1930s.

== Activities and amenities ==
The park is crossed by the Mattatuck Trail, which offers scenic views of the Naugatuck Valley; side trails have views of Black Rock Lake and Black Rock Pond. Swimming and fishing are offered on Black Rock Pond. The park's campground has 78 campsites, available seasonally.
