= Wyantenock State Forest =

Forest in Connecticut, United States

- Interactive map of Wyantenock State Forest
- Location: Warren, Kent, and Cornwall, Connecticut, United States
- Coordinates: 41°46′06″N 73°23′27″W
- Area: 4,497 acres (1,820 ha)
- Elevation: 1,355 ft (413 m)
- Established: 1925
- Administrator: Connecticut Department of Energy and Environmental Protection
- Website: Wyantenock State Forest
Wyantenock State Forest

Wyantenock State Forest is a Connecticut state forest located in the towns of Warren, Kent and Cornwall. The forest consists of nine scattered parcels and was originally part of Mohawk State Forest. While it offers opportunities for hiking, hunting, and mountain biking, the forest is one of the least visited and developed state forests with little or no public access. Letterboxing is no longer active in the forest.
