= Leatherman (vagabond) =

American vagabond of unknown and disputed identity

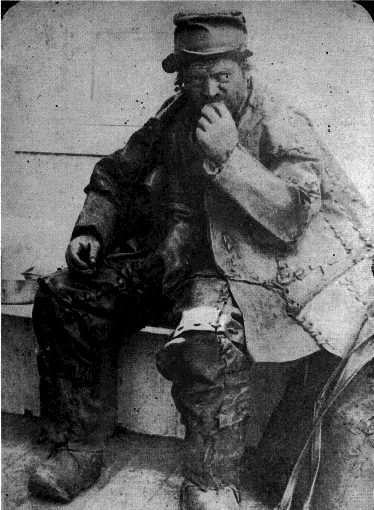
- The Leatherman (June 9, 1885)
- Born: Unknown c. 1839
- Died: March 24, 1889 (aged 49–50); Ossining, Westchester County, New York, U.S.
- Resting place: Sparta Cemetery

The Leatherman (c. 1839–1889) was a vagabond famous for his handmade leather suit of clothes who traveled through the northeastern United States on a regular circuit between the Connecticut River and the Hudson River from roughly 1857 to 1889. Of unknown origin, he was thought to be French-Canadian because of his fluency in the French language, his "broken English", and the French-language prayer book found on his person after his death. His identity remains unknown and controversial. He walked a repeating 365-mile (587 km) route year after year, which took him through certain towns in western Connecticut and eastern New York, returning to each town roughly every 34 days.

== Life ==
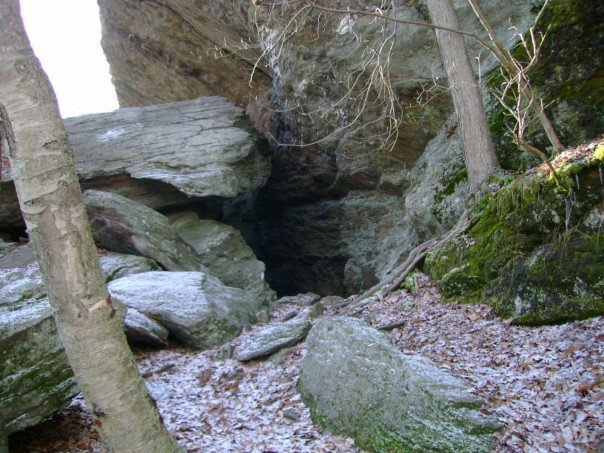
Entrance to the Leatherman Cave in Watertown, Connecticut

The Tory's den

Living in rock shelters and "leatherman caves", as they are now locally known, the Leatherman stopped at towns along his 365-mile (587 km) loop about every five weeks for food and supplies. He was dubbed the "Leatherman" as his adornment of hat, scarf, clothes, and shoes were handmade from leather.

An early article in the Burlington Free Press dated April 7, 1870, refers to him as the "Leather-Clad Man". It also states that he spoke rarely and when addressed would simply speak in monosyllables. According to contemporary rumors, he hailed from Picardy, France.

Fluent in French, he communicated mostly with grunts and gestures, rarely using his broken English. When asked about his background, he would abruptly end the conversation. Upon his death, a French prayer book was found among his possessions. He declined meat on Fridays, giving rise to speculation that he was Roman Catholic. It is unknown how he earned money. One store kept a record of an order: "one loaf of bread, a can of sardines, one-pound of fancy crackers, a pie, two quarts of coffee, one gill of brandy and a bottle of beer".

The Leatherman was well known in Connecticut. He was reliable in his rounds, and people would have food ready for him, which he often ate on their doorsteps. Ten towns along the Leatherman's route passed ordinances exempting him from the Connecticut state "tramp law" passed in 1879.

== Health and death ==
The Leatherman survived blizzards and other foul weather by heating his rock shelters with fire. While his face was frostbitten at times during the winter, by the time of his death he had not lost any fingers, unlike other tramps of the time and area.

The Connecticut Humane Society had him arrested and hospitalized in 1888, which resulted in a diagnosis of "sane except for an emotional affliction", after which he was released, as he had money and desired freedom. He ultimately died from mouth cancer. His body was found on March 24, 1889, in his Saw Mill Woods cave on the farm of George Dell in the town of Mount Pleasant, New York, near Ossining.

== Identity controversy ==
The Leatherman's former tombstone read: "Final resting place of Jules Bourglay of Lyons, France, 'The Leather Man'..." He is identified with that name in many accounts. However, according to researchers including Dan W. DeLuca, as well as his New York death certificate, his identity remains unknown. This name first appeared in a story published in the Waterbury Daily American on August 16, 1884, but was later retracted on March 25, 26, and 27, 1889, and also in The Meriden Daily Journal on March 29, 1889. DeLuca was able to get a new headstone installed when the Leatherman's grave was moved away from Route 9 to another location within the cemetery on May 25, 2011. The new brass plaque simply reads "The Leatherman".

== Grave ==
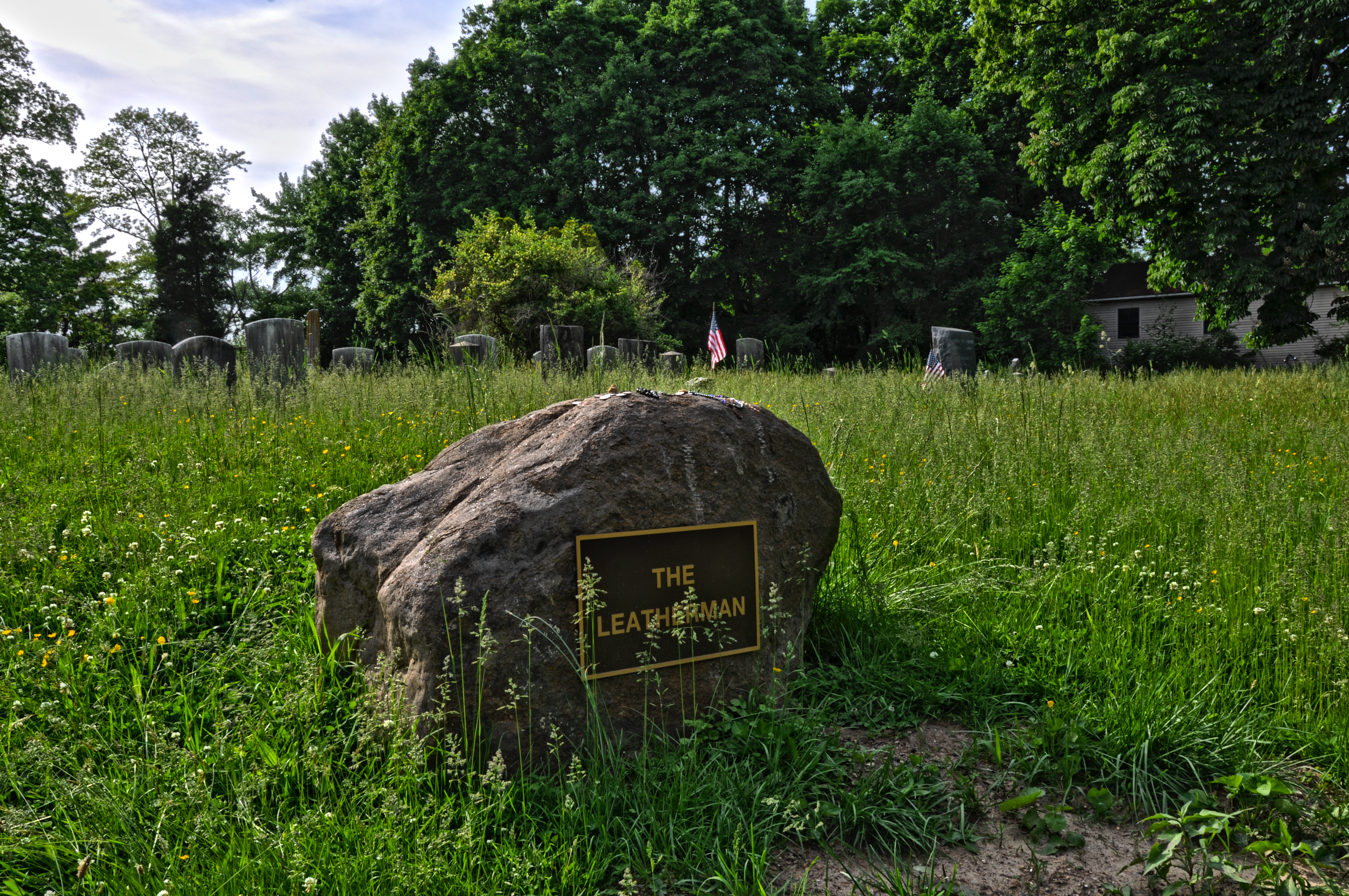
The 2011 grave site with new headstone that reads "The Leatherman".

The Leatherman's grave is in the Sparta Cemetery, on Route 9 in Briarcliff Manor, New York. The following inscription was carved on his original tombstone:

FINAL RESTING PLACE OF

Jules Bourglay
OF LYONS, FRANCE
"THE LEATHER MAN"
who regularly walked a 365-mile route
through Westchester and Connecticut from
the Connecticut River to the Hudson
living in caves in the years
1858–1889

=== Reburial ===
The Leatherman's original grave in Sparta Cemetery was within 16 feet (5 m) of the Albany Post Road, now U.S. Route 9. On May 25, 2011, the grave's contents were exhumed and reburied at a new site in the cemetery. No visible human remains were recovered during the exhumation. Only coffin nails and soil from the original burial plot were reburied in the new grave. One of the reasons for the exhumation was the hope there would be remains that could help determine Leatherman's origins.
